= Toro Rosso STR1 =

Formula One racing car

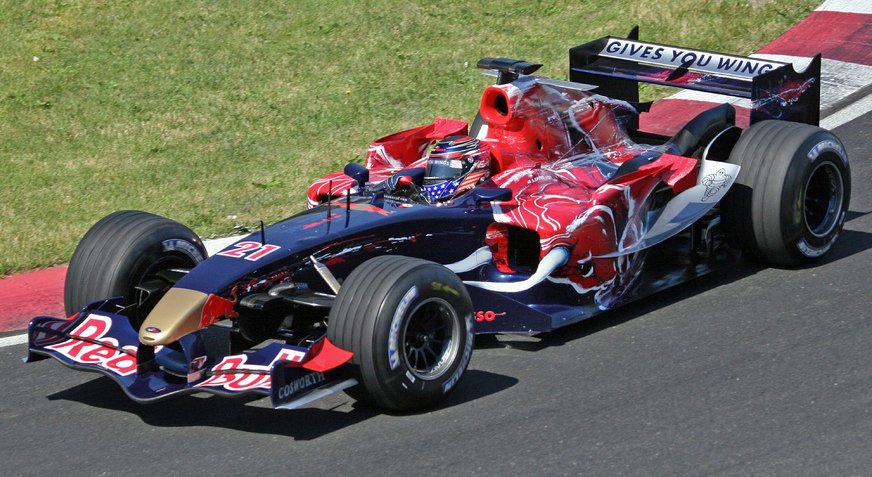
- Scott Speed driving the STR1 during the 2006 Canadian Grand Prix
- Category: Formula One
- Constructor: Toro Rosso
- Designers: David Pitchforth (Managing Director, Technical - Red Bull); Ian Pocock (Engineering Director - Red Bull); Rob Taylor (Chief Designer - Red Bull); Alessandro Poggi (Head of Electronics); Ben Agathangelou (Head of Aerodynamics - Red Bull)
- Predecessor: Minardi PS05
- Successor: STR2

Technical specifications
- Chassis: Carbon-fibre monocoque
- Suspension (front): Cast titanium uprights, pushrods, carbon-fibre upper and lower wishbones
- Suspension (rear): As front
- Engine: Cosworth TJ2005 3.0 L (183 cu in) V10 (90°) Normally aspirated
- Transmission: Red Bull seven-speed longitudinally-mounted sequential with hydraulic shift and clutch operation
- Power: 915 hp (682.3 kW) @ 19,000 rpm (rev-limited to 16,700/17,000 rpm)
- Weight: 605 kg (1,334 lb) including driver
- Fuel: BP
- Lubricants: Cosworth Performance Engineered Motor Oil SAE 0W-20
- Tyres: Michelin

Competition history
- Notable entrants: Scuderia Toro Rosso
- Notable drivers: 20. (Italy) Vitantonio Liuzzi; 21. (United States) Scott Speed
- Debut: 2006 Bahrain Grand Prix
- Last event: 2006 Brazilian Grand Prix
| Races | Wins | Poles | F/Laps |
|---|---|---|---|
| 18 | 0 | 0 | 0 |

The Scuderia Toro Rosso STR1 (originally known as the Minardi PS06) was the car with which the Scuderia Toro Rosso team competed in the 2006 Formula One season. It was driven by Vitantonio Liuzzi, who had started four Grands Prix for the sister Red Bull Racing team in 2005, and debutant Scott Speed, the first American driver to compete in F1 since Michael Andretti in 1993.

The STR1 was the first car from the Faenza-based team to use Michelin tyres since the Minardi PS02 in 2002. The STR1 was also the first Toro Rosso F1 car to feature the mandatory 7-speed gearbox configuration, as well as the last Formula One car to use the 3.0 L V10 engine configuration (previously used between 1995 and 2005) to date, but with a 16,700 rpm rev limiter and 77mm air restrictor.

== History ==
2006 marked a new beginning, as Red Bull had bought the Minardi team which had competed in F1 for twenty years and renamed it using the Italian translation of their brand name. The new team inherited Minardi's technical team and its factory at Faenza only, as ex-owner Paul Stoddart kept Minardi's other property in Ledbury. A deal that allowed the team to run restricted V10 engines, instead of V8s, was also maintained despite the new ownership.

This allowed Toro Rosso to use an almost identical version of the previous year's Red Bull RB1 coupled with the same Cosworth engines, only power-restricted under the FIA's equivalency formula and also without any factory support from Cosworth. Both the chassis-sharing and V10 engine usage remained controversial topics throughout the season, as the engine agreement was designed to benefit the former Minardi and not the much richer Red Bull company. However, this wore off as the season progressed, as fears over the car's potential performance advantage proved to be unfounded.

This was largely due to the year-old chassis, the torque advantage of the V10 being canceled out by traction control, and the lack of engine development and tyre testing given to the team. However, the team were generally more competitive than Midland/Spyker and Super Aguri, and Liuzzi was able to score the team's only point at Indianapolis.

Liuzzi was generally the quicker of the drivers, although Speed improved as he gained experience. Despite both gettings involved in several accidents and mistakes due to their inexperience, the STR duo both drew praise from the part-team owner Gerhard Berger for their performances.

The team eventually finished ninth in the Constructors' Championship, with one point.

The car would later be given to the BOSS GP F1. As of 2025, the car is driven by the Austrian driver Ingo Gerstl for Team Top Speed.

== Sponsorship and livery ==
Compared to its parent team livery, the STR1 sported a darker shade of blue, with a golden-tipped nosecone. The car had a distinctive raging bull painting on its engine cover, which was designed by Austrian sculptor Jos Pirkner. and handsprayed by Knud Tiroch before each Grand Prix.

The only sponsors logos present in the STR1 were from parent company Red Bull and suppliers Michelin and Cosworth.

== Gallery ==
David Coulthard driving the STR1 at Goodwood 2009

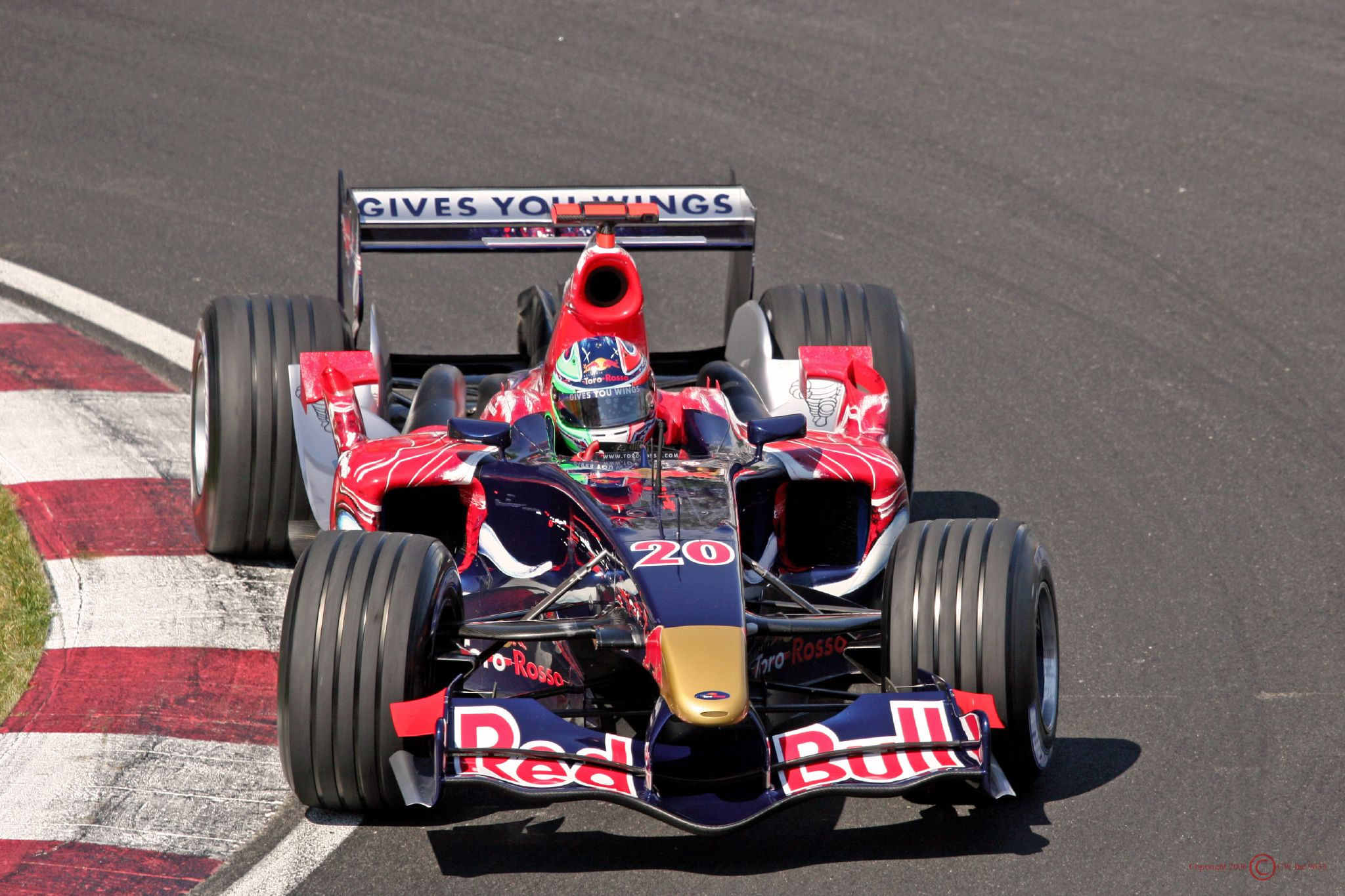
Vitantonio Liuzzi at the 2006 Canadian Grand Prix.

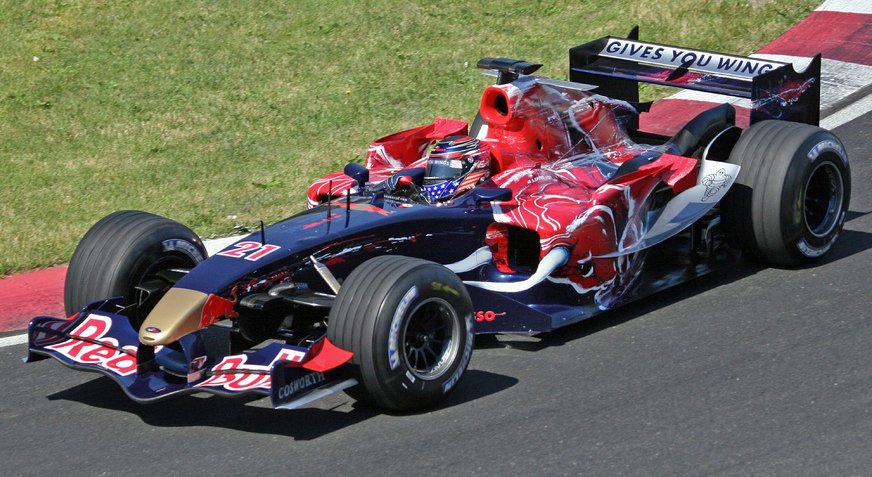
Scott Speed at the 2006 Canadian Grand Prix.

== BOSS GP ==
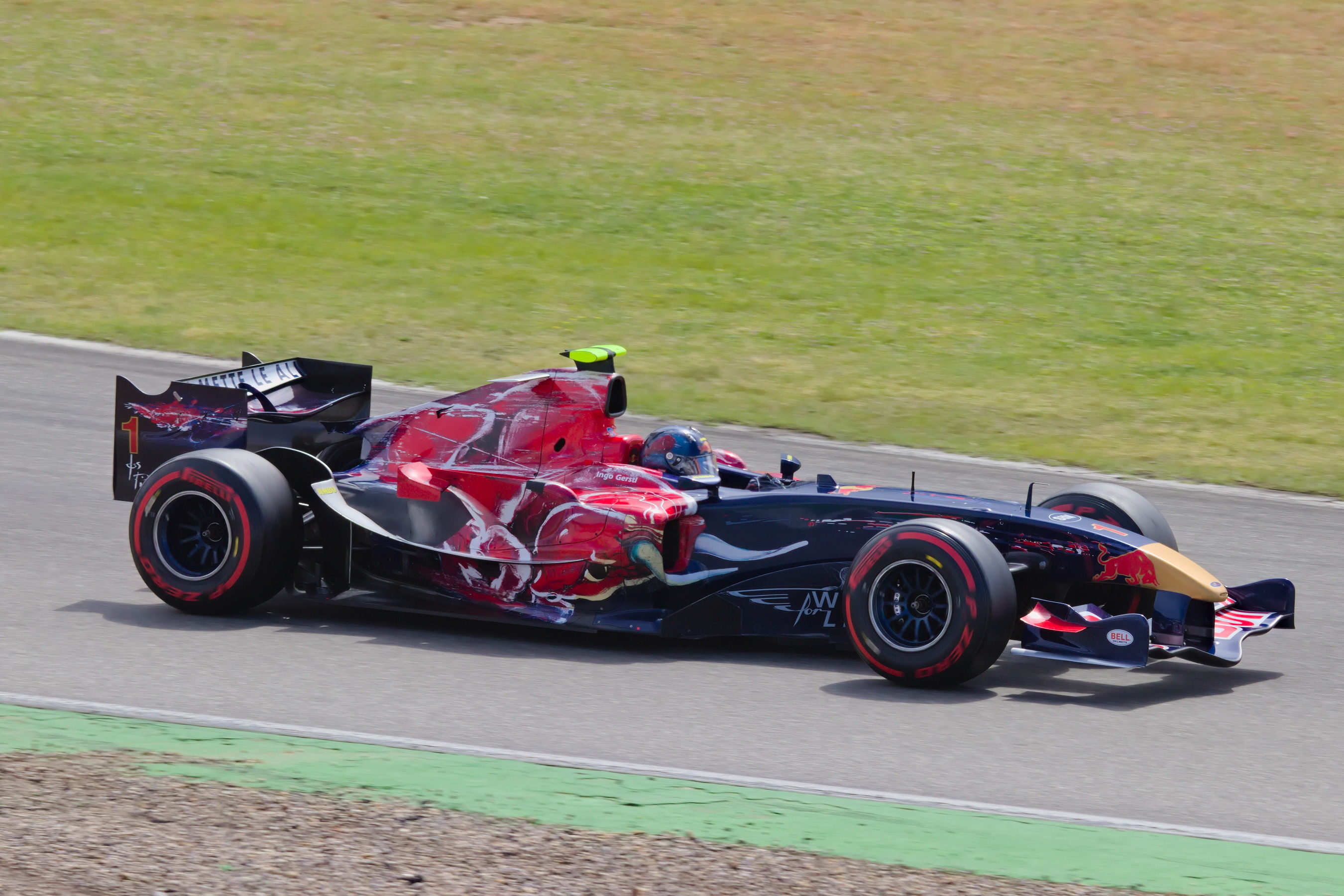
Ingo Gerstl at the Hockenheim Historic.

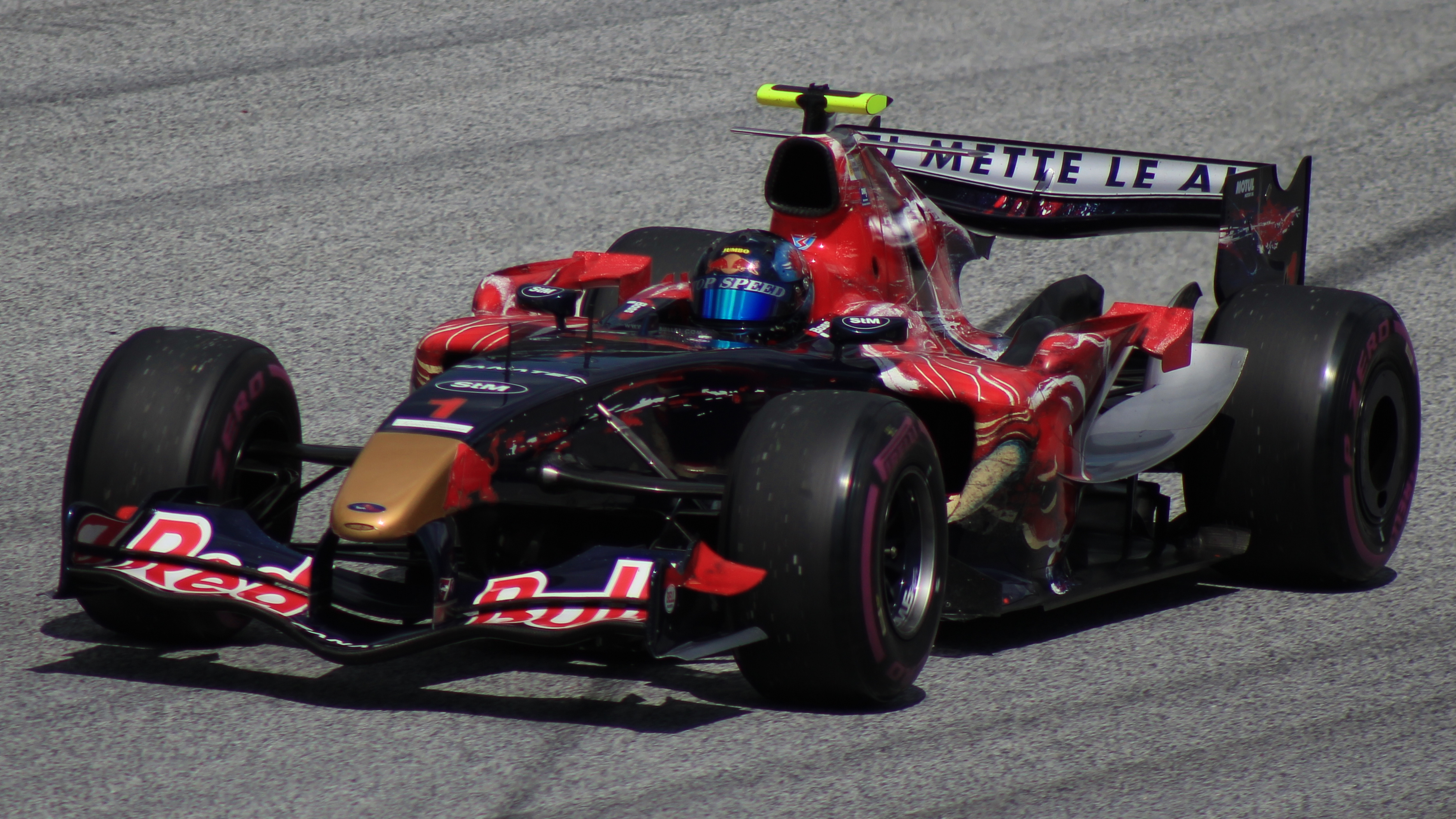
Ingo Gerstl at the Red Bull Ring.

The STR1 is still actively used in the BOSS GP Series, driven by Ingo Gerstl for the Top Speed team and have won the Open Class title from 2016 to 2020 and in 2022 and 2023.

== Complete Formula One results ==
(key) (results in bold indicate pole position)

| Year | Team | Engine | Tyres | Drivers | 1 | 2 | 3 | 4 | 5 | 6 | 7 | 8 | 9 | 10 | 11 | 12 | 13 | 14 | 15 | 16 | 17 | 18 | Points | WCC |
|---|---|---|---|---|---|---|---|---|---|---|---|---|---|---|---|---|---|---|---|---|---|---|---|---|
| 2006 | Scuderia Toro Rosso | Cosworth V10 | **M** | | BAH | MAL | AUS | SAN | EUR | ESP | MON | GBR | CAN | USA | FRA | GER | HUN | TUR | ITA | CHN | JPN | BRA | 1 | 9th |
| 2006 | Scuderia Toro Rosso | Cosworth V10 | **M** | (Italy) Vitantonio Liuzzi | 11 | 11 | Ret | 14 | Ret | 15^{†} | 10 | 13 | 13 | 8 | 13 | 10 | Ret | Ret | 14 | 10 | 14 | 13 | 1 | 9th |
| 2006 | Scuderia Toro Rosso | Cosworth V10 | **M** | (United States) Scott Speed | 13 | Ret | 9 | 15 | 11 | Ret | 13 | Ret | 10 | Ret | 10 | 12 | 11 | 13 | 13 | 14 | 18^{†} | 11 | 1 | 9th |

^{†} Driver did not finish the Grand Prix but was classified as he completed over 90% of the race distance.
