= Red Bull RB2 =

Formula One racing car

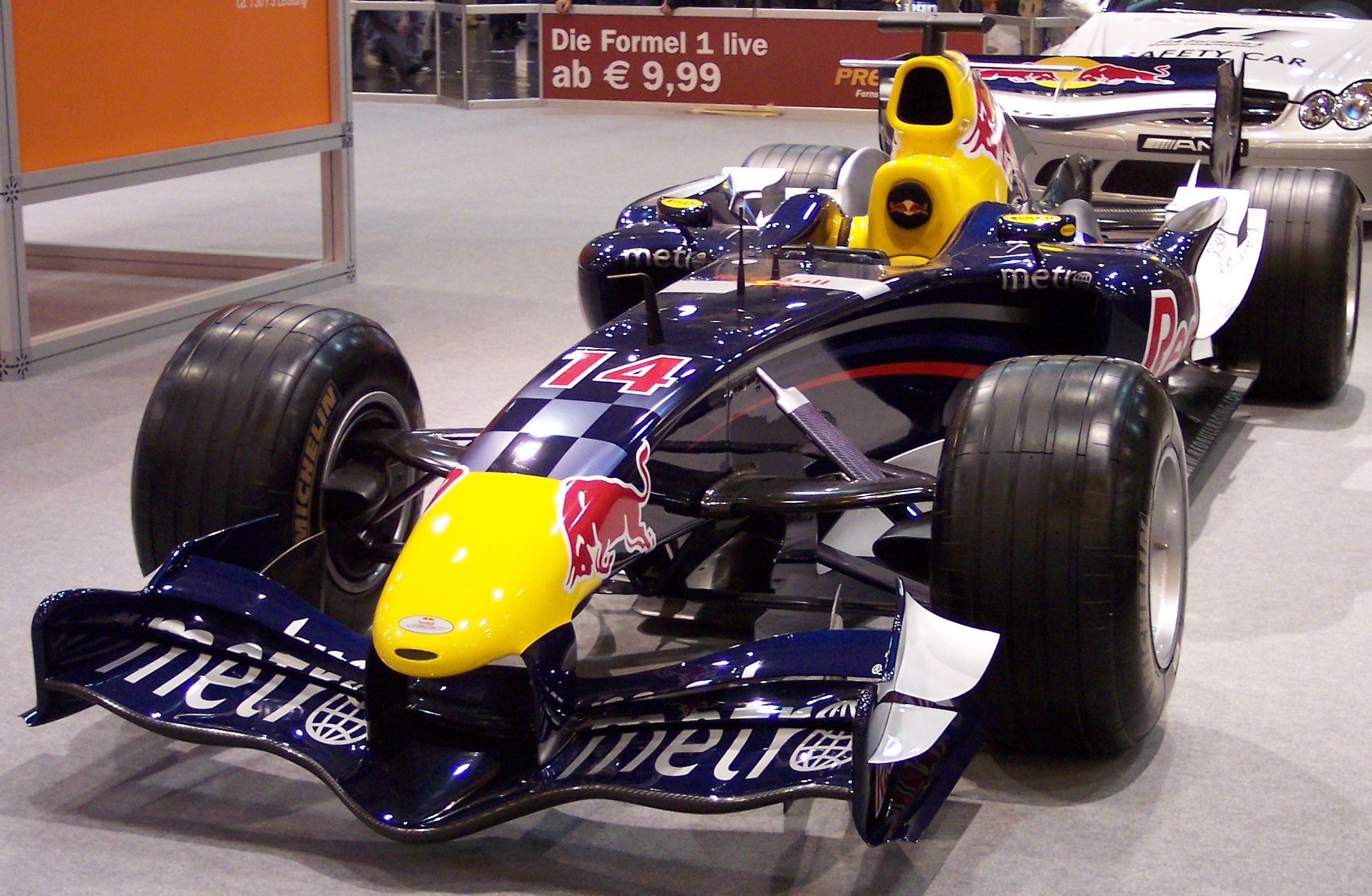
- David Coulthard's RB2
- Category: Formula One
- Constructor: Red Bull
- Designers: Mark Smith (Technical Director); Rob Taylor (Chief Designer); Anton Stipinovich (Head of R&D - Controls and Development); Andrew Green (Head of R&D - Testing and Vehicle Dynamics); Ben Agathangelou (Head of Aerodynamics)
- Predecessor: RB1
- Successor: RB3

Technical specifications
- Chassis: carbon-fibre and honeycomb composite structure
- Suspension (front): aluminium uprights, upper and lower carbon wishbones with pushrods, torsion bar springs and anti-roll bars
- Suspension (rear): aluminium uprights, upper and lower carbon wishbones with pushrods, torsion bar springs and anti-roll bars
- Engine: Ferrari Tipo 056 90-degree V8
- Transmission: Red Bull seven-speed longitudinal
- Power: 735-785 hp @ 19,000+ rpm
- Fuel: Shell V-Power
- Tyres: Michelin

Competition history
- Notable entrants: Red Bull Racing
- Notable drivers: 14. (United Kingdom) David Coulthard; 15. (Austria) Christian Klien; 15. (Netherlands) Robert Doornbos
- Debut: 2006 Bahrain Grand Prix
- Last event: 2006 Brazilian Grand Prix
Races	Wins	Podiums	Poles	F/Laps
18	0	1	0	0
- Constructors' Championships: 0
- Drivers' Championships: 0

The Red Bull RB2 is the car with which the Red Bull Racing team competed in the 2006 Formula One season. The chassis was designed by Mark Smith, Rob Taylor and Ben Agathangelou and the engines were supplied by Ferrari. It was driven by David Coulthard and Christian Klien, who had both driven for the team in its debut year, 2005. However, Klien was replaced after the Italian GP by third driver Robert Doornbos after the Austrian refused the team's offer of a Champ Car seat for 2007 once it became apparent that he was going to be replaced by Mark Webber for the next season.

The RB2 was also the first customer Ferrari-powered Formula One car outside Sauber since the Acer-badged Prost AP04 in the 2001 season.

== History ==
After the good results of the previous inaugural season, 2006 was a poor season for Red Bull. The year was treated as a consolidation season and proved to be a traditionally tough second year for a new team. The new Ferrari engines caused cooling problems pre-season which saw testing time limited, and for the most part the team were bogged down in the midfield. This situation was exacerbated by RBR abandoning development on the RB2 during the season to let new Chief Technical Officer Adrian Newey concentrate on 2007's challenger.

However, there were still highlights in a largely depressing season. Foremost among these was Coulthard scoring the team's first podium at Monaco. As this coincided with a one-race deal to promote the new Superman film, the veteran driver wore a red cape on the podium, and Team Principal Christian Horner later honoured a pre-race promise of jumping into the team's pool wearing nothing but one of the capes.

The team eventually finished seventh in the Constructors' Championship, with 16 points.

== Sponsorship and livery ==
The livery of the RB2 is essentially identical to that of its predecessor, the RB1. The only differences are the reversal of the color scheme of the three side stripes and the removal of the checkered flag motif from the bonnet and the outside of the rear wing side bulkheads. In this last position the motif has been replaced by a continuation of the three aforementioned bands.

For the Monaco Grand Prix the two RB2s compete with a special livery aimed at promoting the release of the film Superman Returns. It varies from the usual one due to the appearance of a red cape, inspired by that of Superman, which starts from the cockpit and wraps around the upper part of the bellies and the rear wing, where, on the outside of the bulkheads, the insignia of Superman. All decorative elements of the original livery are eliminated, except for a gray line on the sides of the survival cell. An image of the Man of Steel's chest also appears on the muzzle. For this race the Red Bull pit crew wore white overalls Among the drivers, Klien wore a blue overall on the day of the race.

At the Japanese Grand Prix, the sponsor 7-Eleven appeared on the endplate of the car's bargeboards and rear wing.

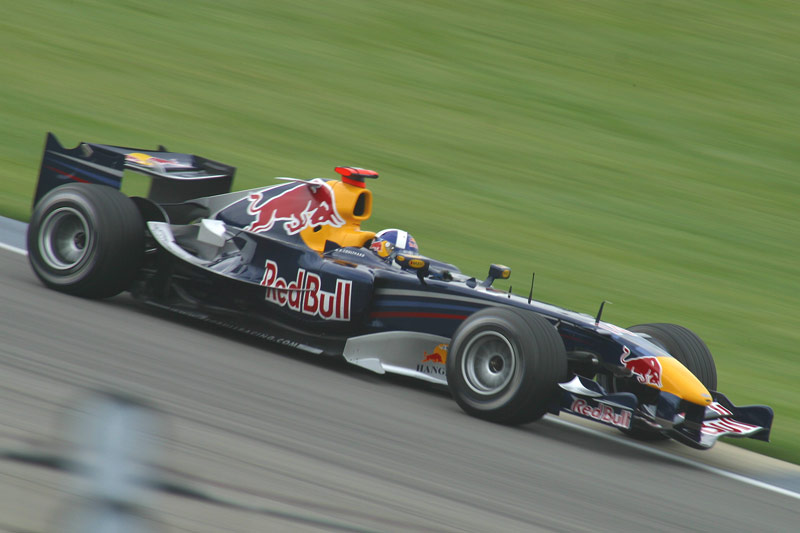
David Coulthard at the 2006 United States Grand Prix.

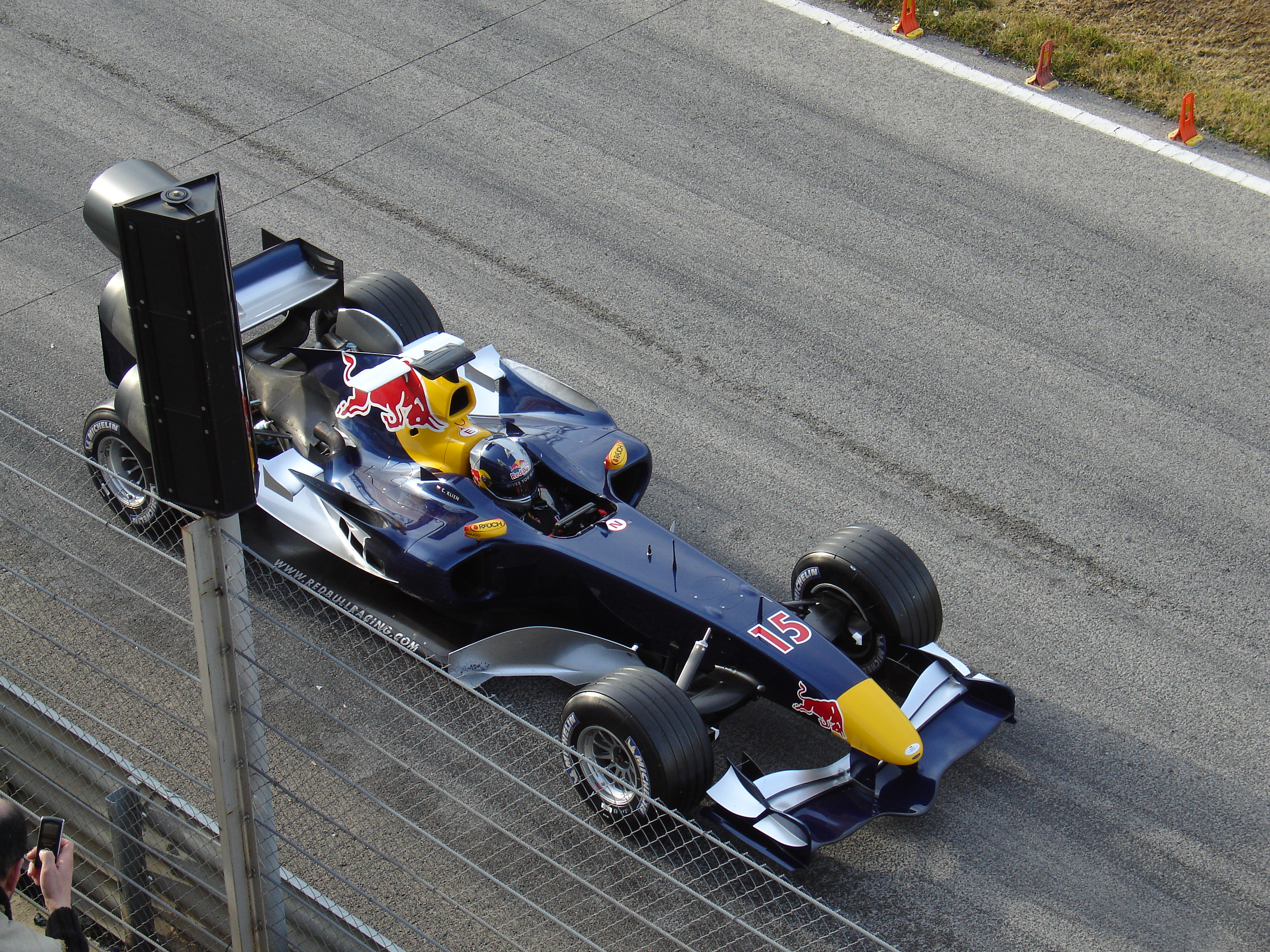
Christian Klien testing at Valencia.

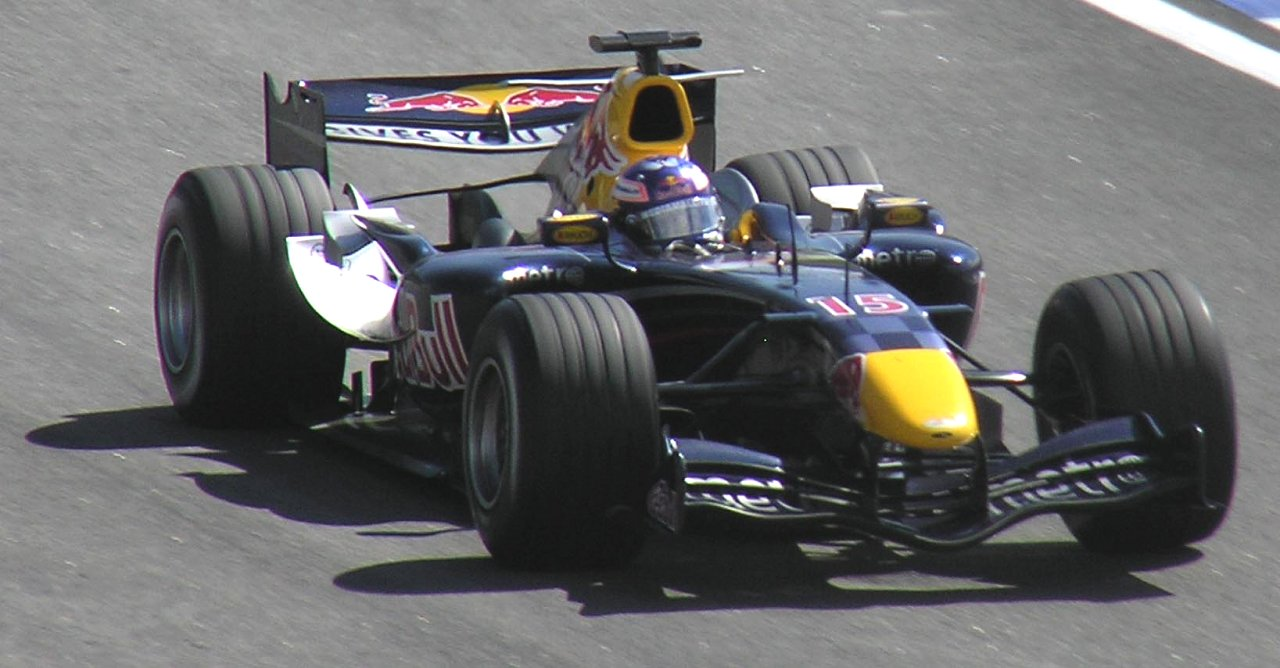
Robert Doornbos at the 2006 Brazilian Grand Prix.

== Complete Formula One results ==
(key) (results in bold indicate pole position)

Year	Entrant	Engine	Tyres	Drivers	1	2	3	4	5	6	7	8	9	10	11	12	13	14	15	16	17	18	Points	WCC
2006	Red Bull Racing	Ferrari V8	**M**		BHR	MAL	AUS	SMR	EUR	ESP	MON	GBR	CAN	USA	FRA	GER	HUN	TUR	ITA	CHN	JPN	BRA	16	7th
2006	Red Bull Racing	Ferrari V8	**M**	(United Kingdom) David Coulthard	10	Ret	8	Ret	Ret	14	3	12	8	7	9	11	5	15^{†}	12	9	Ret	Ret	16	7th
2006	Red Bull Racing	Ferrari V8	**M**	(Austria) Christian Klien	8	Ret	Ret	Ret	Ret	13	Ret	14	11	Ret	12	8	Ret	11	11				16	7th
2006	Red Bull Racing	Ferrari V8	**M**	(Netherlands) Robert Doornbos	TD	TD	TD	TD	TD	TD	TD	TD	TD	TD	TD	TD	TD	TD	TD	12	13	12	16	7th
