= RB1 =

RB1 may refer to:

- Red Bull RB1, a Formula 1 car
- Retinoblastoma protein, a tumor suppressor protein
