= Agathangelou =

Agathangelou is a Greek surname Αγαθαγγέλου. Notable people with the surname include:

- Andrea Agathangelou (born 1989), South African cricketer
- Ben Agathangelou (born 1971), English Formula One designer
- Mariana Agathangelou (born 1988), British badminton player
