= Christian Klien =

Austrian racing driver (born 1983)

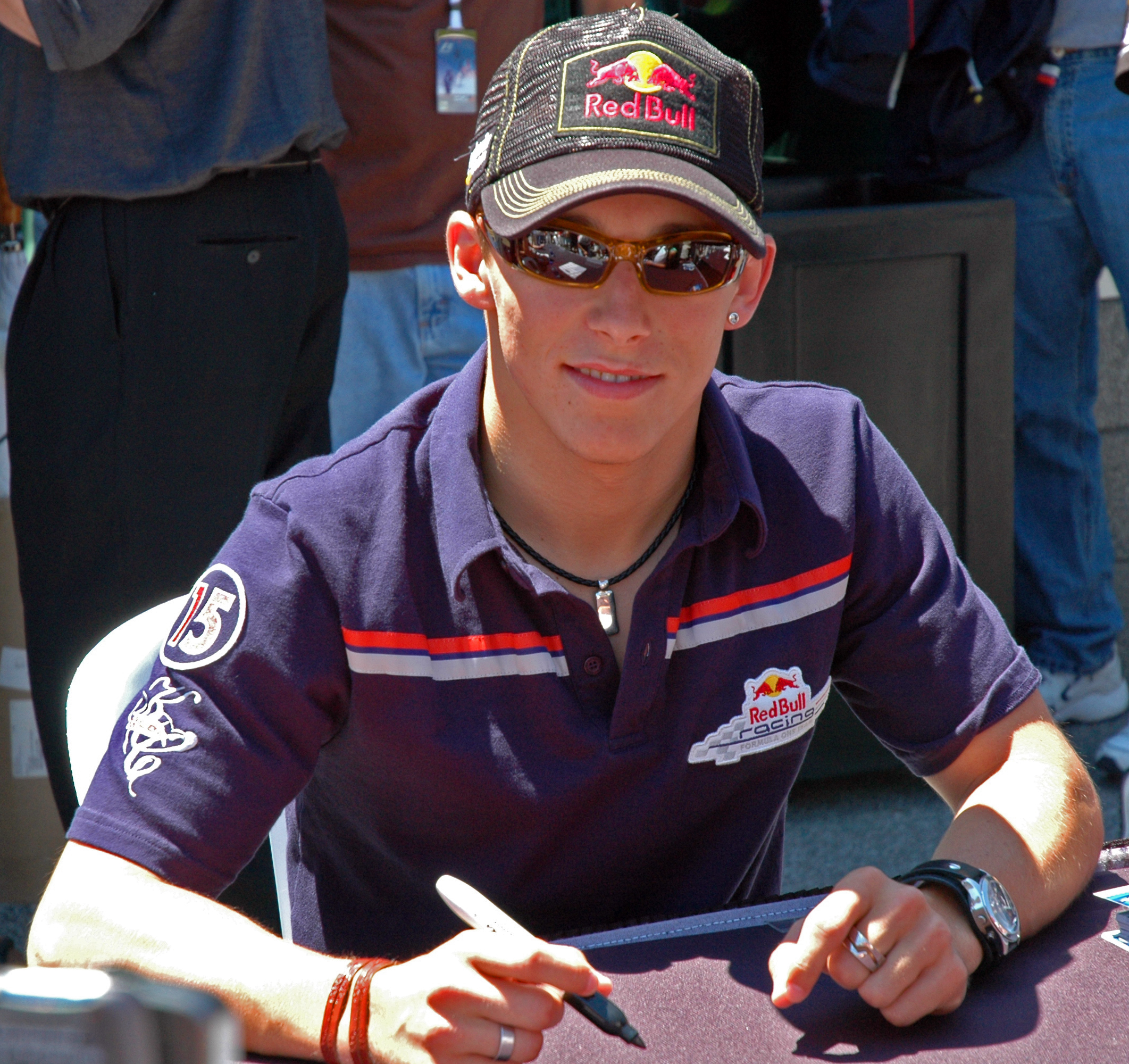
- Klien in 2005
- Born: 7 February 1983 (age 43); Hohenems, Austria

Formula One World Championship career
- Nationality: (Austria) Austrian
- Active years: 2004–2006, 2010
- Team(s): Jaguar, Red Bull, HRT
- Entries: 51 (49 starts)
- Championships: 0
- Wins: 0
- Podiums: 0
- Career points: 14
- Pole positions: 0
- Fastest laps: 0
- First entry: 2004 Australian Grand Prix
- Last entry: 2010 Abu Dhabi Grand Prix

24 Hours of Le Mans career
- Years: 2008–2009, 2011, 2014
- Teams: Peugeot, Aston Martin, Morand
- Best finish: 3rd (2008)
- Class wins: 0

Previous series
- 2016–2023 2021 2015 2013–2014 2013 2012 2003 2002 2002 2000–2001 1999: GTWC Europe; DTM; FIA WEC; ELMS; Auto GP; V8 Supercars; F3 Euro Series; German Formula Renault; Formula Renault Eurocup; Formula BMW ADAC; Formula BMW Junior

Championship titles
- 2003 2002: Masters of Formula 3 German Formula Renault

Christian Klien (born 7 February 1983) is an Austrian racing driver who competed in Formula One between 2004 and 2010. (Note: The exact years Klien competed in Formula One: 2004–2006, 2010.)

Born and raised in Hohenems, Klien competed in Formula One for Jaguar, Red Bull and HRT, scoring 14 championship points across 51 Grands Prix.

== Racing career ==
Born in Hohenems, Klien started his motorsport career in his early teens. He raced in karting championships in both Austria and Switzerland, before moving to Formula BMW. After winning several titles in lower Formulas, Klien moved into Formula One, driving for the Jaguar Racing team, alongside Mark Webber. At the end of 2004, however, Jaguar sold its Formula One team to Red Bull, which renamed it Red Bull Racing. In an unusual arrangement, Klien shared a race seat with Italian Vitantonio Liuzzi. He stayed at Red Bull for 2006, whilst Liuzzi moved to the Red Bull junior team, Scuderia Toro Rosso.

After an unsuccessful 2006, Klien's old teammate Mark Webber replaced him for the 2007 season, news Klien learned from Webber himself. Klien was offered alternatives to Formula One for 2007, including driving in the ChampCar series, but he refused and aimed for a seat in Formula One. He secured the test driver's seat at Honda, despite competition from other drivers, including Gary Paffett.

On 2 February 2008, Klien signed as BMW Sauber's reserve and test driver for the 2008 Formula One season, alongside Estonian Marko Asmer.

=== Pre-Formula One ===
Klien became enthused about racing when his dad brought him to watch a go-kart race. This enthusiasm for the sport was only increased after meeting Brazilian Formula One driver Ayrton Senna. The Austrian started his career at the age of 13. From 1996 to 1998, Klien won several kart races in both Switzerland and his native Austria, becoming the Suisse champion in his first year.

In 1999, Klien moved to racing in the Formula BMW ADAC Junior Cup, winning four races and finishing fourth in the series. The following year, he moved into the main Formula BMW ADAC Championship with Team Rosberg, finishing the series ranked tenth overall and third in the rookie rankings. Continuing in the series in 2001, Klien managed to win five races, and ended up third in the series. Joining JD Motorsport for the Italian winter Formula Renault series, he won one event, which led to a drive for the team in German Formula Renault for 2002.

Klien won four races, winning the German title, and finishing fifth in the European series. From there, Klien moved into the Formula Three Euroseries, with Mücke Motorsport, winning four races and finishing runner-up to Ryan Briscoe. Klien also won the 2003 Marlboro Masters event at Zandvoort.

=== Formula One ===
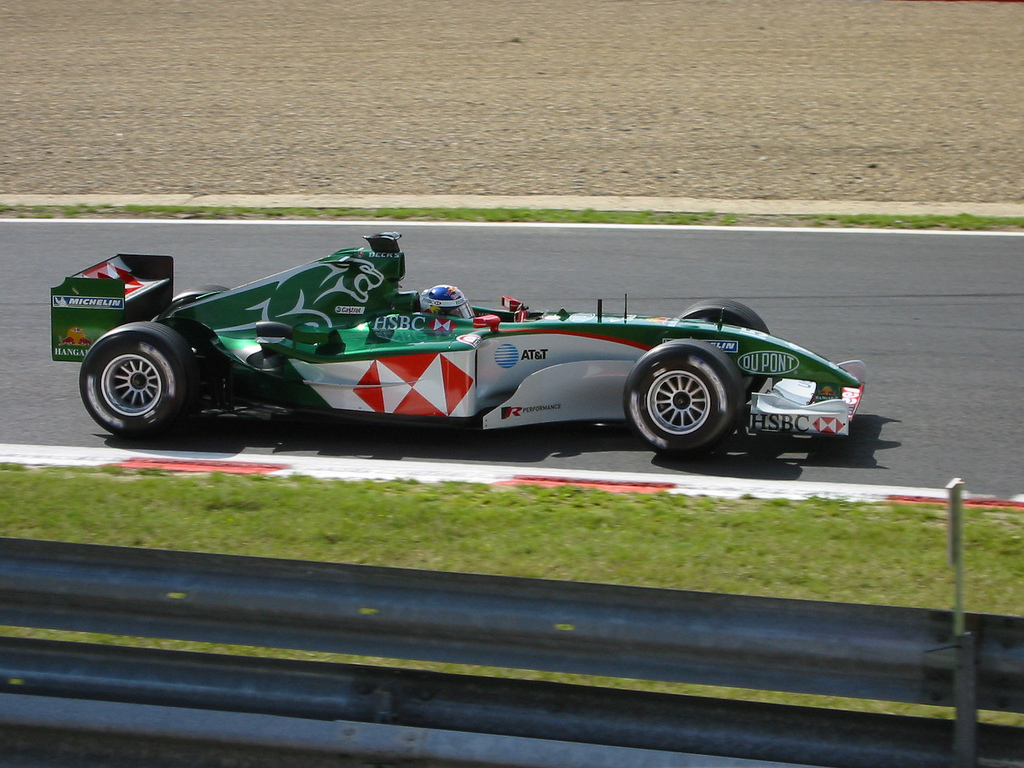
Klien driving for Jaguar at the 2004 Belgian Grand Prix, where he scored his first Formula One points

==== Jaguar (2004) ====
In December 2003, Klien was signed as a race driver for the Jaguar Formula One team for the 2004 season, replacing Justin Wilson, who had replaced Antônio Pizzonia for the final five Grands Prix of the 2003 season. He had significant pressure on him as second driver to his more experienced teammate Mark Webber, but was the first driver to ever outqualify Webber from the same team.

Klien proved to be considerably reliable over the season, retiring only on four occasions out of the possible 18. Klien's only points scoring finish in his debut season came in Belgium, where Klien finished sixth; scoring three Championship points. He finished alongside Cristiano da Matta and Nick Heidfeld in joint 16th in the Drivers' Championship.

==== Red Bull (2005–2006) ====
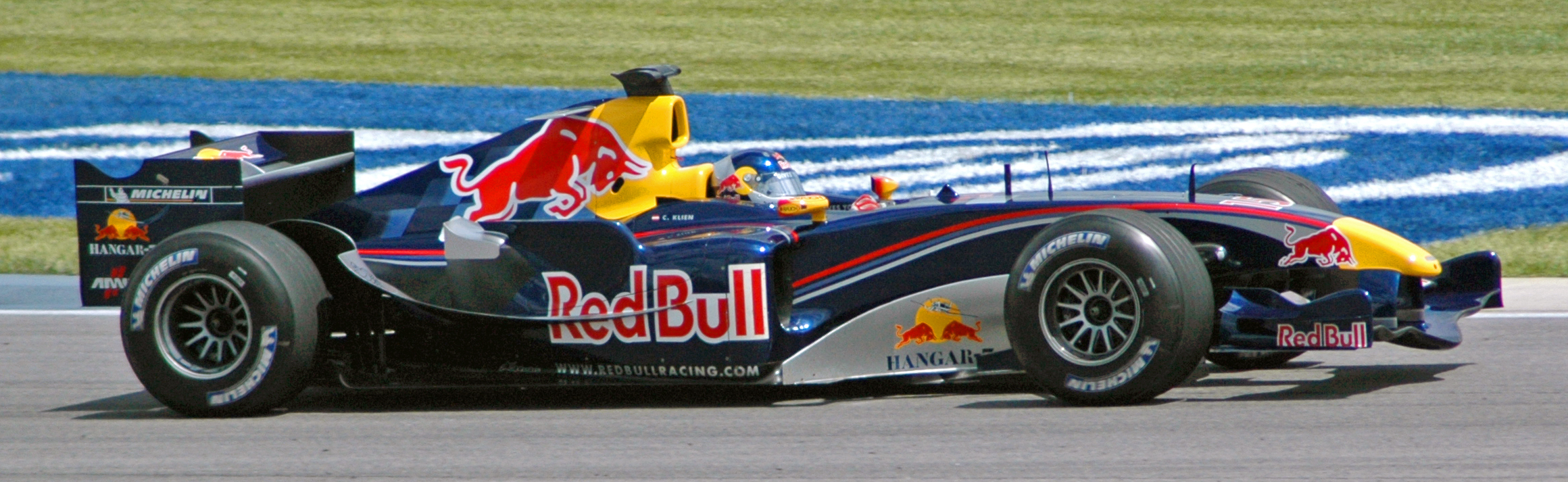
Klien in qualifying at the 2005 United States Grand Prix

2005

Jaguar were bought out in November 2004 by Austrian energy drink company Red Bull and were renamed Red Bull Racing. During winter testing in 2005, Klien tested several times for Red Bull Racing alongside Vitantonio Liuzzi and David Coulthard. Klien secured the second race seat at Red Bull, alongside Coulthard. Klien started the year with points finishes in the first two races before retiring in Bahrain before the race had even started due to an electrical problem.

With both Klien and Liuzzi signed to race for the Red Bull team in 2005, Red Bull announced that Liuzzi would be racing at the next four rounds in San Marino, Spain, Monaco and the European Grands Prix instead of Klien. Originally, Klien was ineligible to be a third driver at these Grand Prix, as he had competed in over six Grand Prix the previous year, but after a majority of teams asked the FIA to remove this ruling, Klien was allowed to take this role at Imola.

Klien returned to the race seat for the Canadian Grand Prix and maintained his race seat thanks to his strong performances and Red Bull's increased number of seats from the purchase of the Minardi team (which was renamed Scuderia Toro Rosso, Italian for "Team Red Bull") in 2006. Klien finished his second year in Formula One with two further points finishes: an eighth-place finish in Turkey and a fifth at the season-finale in China. After a promising performance in China, it was confirmed in December 2005 that Klien would drive for the Red Bull Racing outfit alongside David Coulthard for the 2006 season.

2006

Klien started 2006 strongly, qualifying in the top-ten for the first two races of the season. In Bahrain he finished eighth, scoring a point. However, in Malaysia he collided with Kimi Räikkönen on the first lap and had to pit with suspension damage, before eventually dropping out with a hydraulic failure.

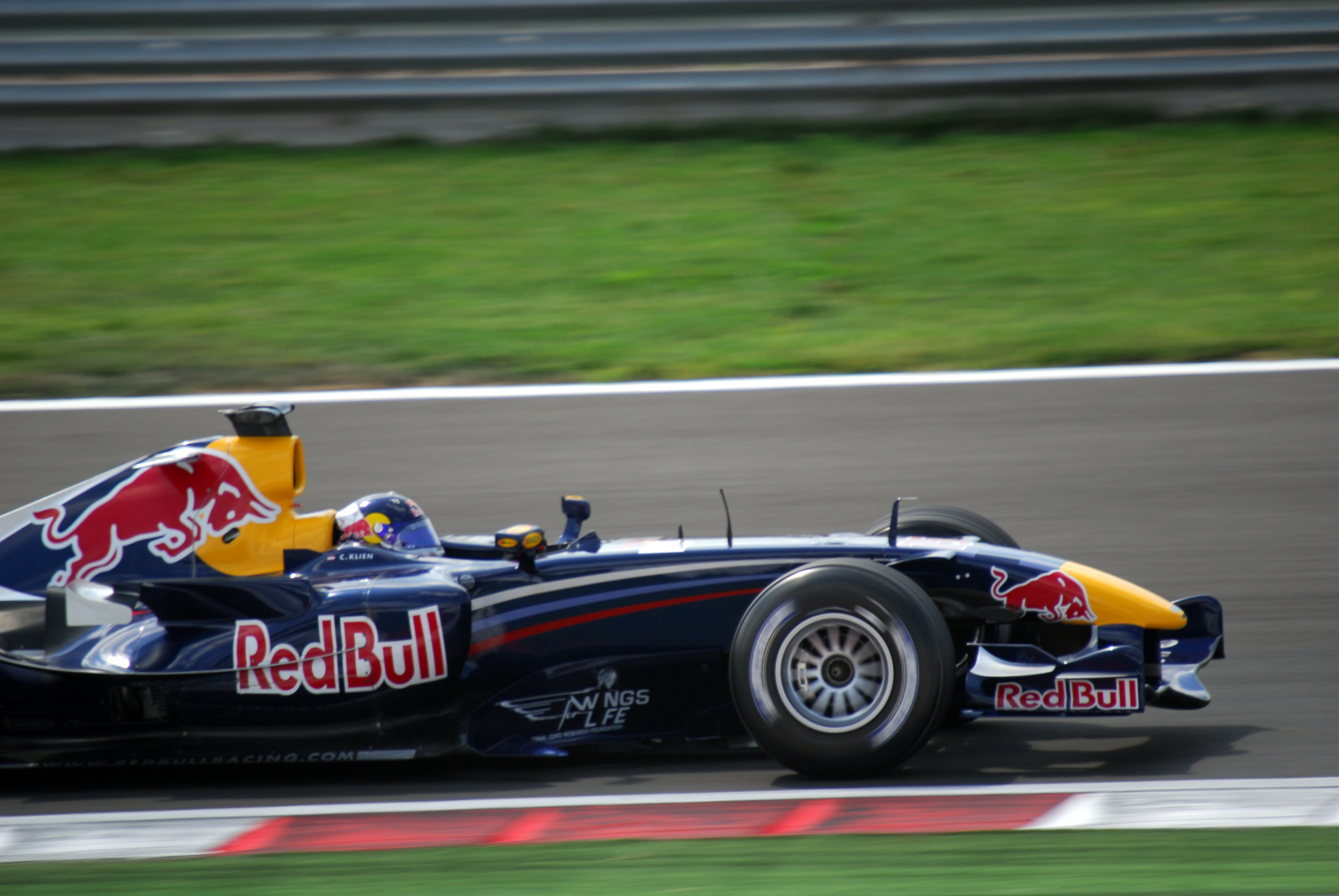
Klien driving for RBR at the 2006 Turkish Grand Prix

In 2006, Klien was unsuccessful in comparison to his more experienced teammate David Coulthard, as the Scot scored the team's first podium and was more consistent than Klien throughout the season. In August 2006, it was confirmed that Klien would not stay with the Red Bull team for the upcoming 2007 season, or at least as a race driver, due to Red Bull's signing of Mark Webber. After the two points finishes in Bahrain and Germany, there was some uncertainty as to where Klien would go next in his racing career, speculation suggested the United States as a logical choice for Klien, but he refused a ChampCar seat in a Red Bull-backed team for 2007, preferring to chase a Formula One drive with another team. As a result, the team announced that Klien had been fired for the last three races of the season in favour of test driver Robert Doornbos.

==== Honda and BMW Sauber (2007–2009) ====
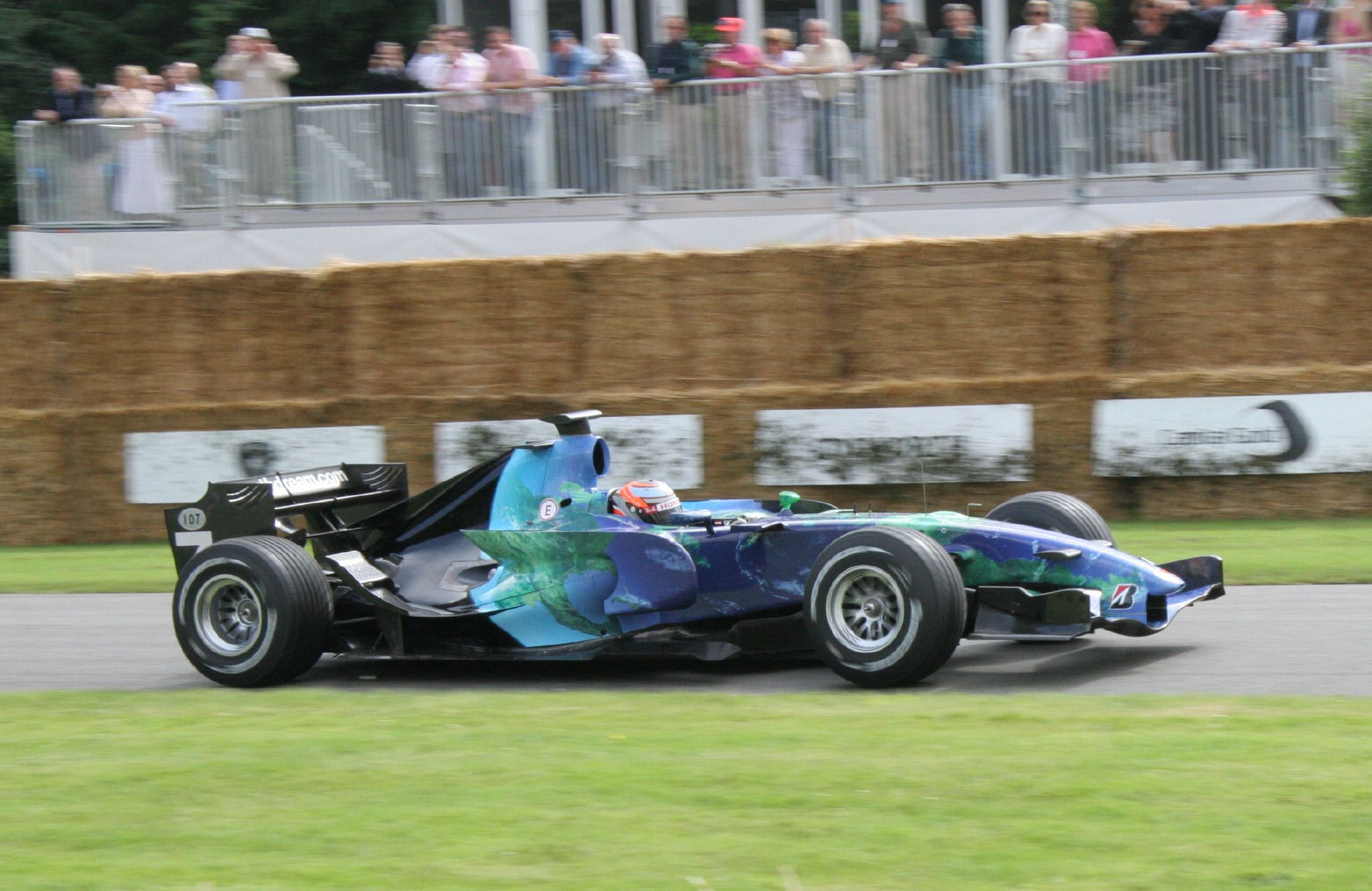
Klien driving a Honda RA107 at the 2007 Goodwood Festival of Speed

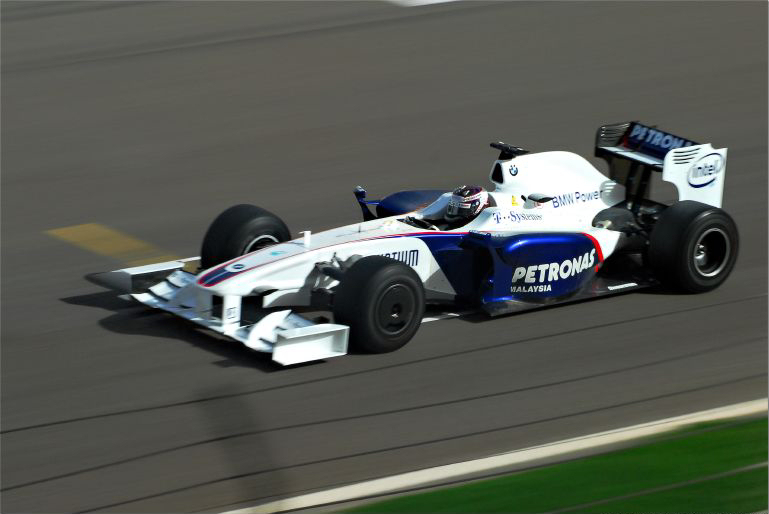
Klien testing for BMW Sauber in Bahrain prior to the 2009 season

On 15 November 2006, Honda Racing announced the signing of Klien as their test and reserve driver for the 2007 season. The Austrian made his debut for the Japanese works team at the Circuit de Catalunya, during the early pre-season testing during late November 2006. At the 2007 British Grand Prix, he replaced the injured Jenson Button for the second free practice session on Friday. On 11 July 2007, Klien was released by Honda F1 to test with Spyker with a view to replacing Christijan Albers who was released because of sponsorship problems. However, the seat went to Japanese driver Sakon Yamamoto.

In 2008, Klien signed as BMW Sauber's test and reserve driver for the 2008 Formula One season. He also signed with Peugeot to race in 24 Hours of Le Mans. Driving the Peugeot 908 HDi FAP he finished third overall with Ricardo Zonta and Franck Montagny. In October he participated in Petit Le Mans in the American Le Mans Series, driving with Peugeot's factory drivers Marc Gené and Nicolas Minassian.

Klien remained in the position of BMW Sauber's test and reserve driver for 2009. He also returned to Le Mans with Peugeot, finishing sixth overall in a 908 shared with Pedro Lamy and Minassian.

For 2010, Klien was understood to be an option for Sauber before the seat went to Pedro de la Rosa.

==== HRT (2010) ====
Klien was then tipped to become Hispania Racing's reserve driver despite being second favourite to ex-US F1 man José María López but neither Klien or López got the seat. It went to former Super Aguri F1 and Spyker F1 driver Sakon Yamamoto. However, he was later signed by Hispania as well as Yamamoto. He took part in his first Grand Prix weekend for three years at the Spanish Grand Prix, where he drove in the first practice session in place of Karun Chandhok. He replaced Chandhok again at the European Grand Prix where his session was made difficult by problems with his car. At the Singapore Grand Prix, he was confirmed as a replacement for the ill Sakon Yamamoto, marking his first grand prix since the 2006 Italian Grand Prix. He qualified in 22nd place, over a second ahead of team mate Bruno Senna, and ran just ahead of him in the race until a mechanical problem forced him to retire. He replaced Yamamoto for the final two races of the season in Brazil and Abu Dhabi, but the team did not retain his services into the 2011 season.

== Post-Formula One ==
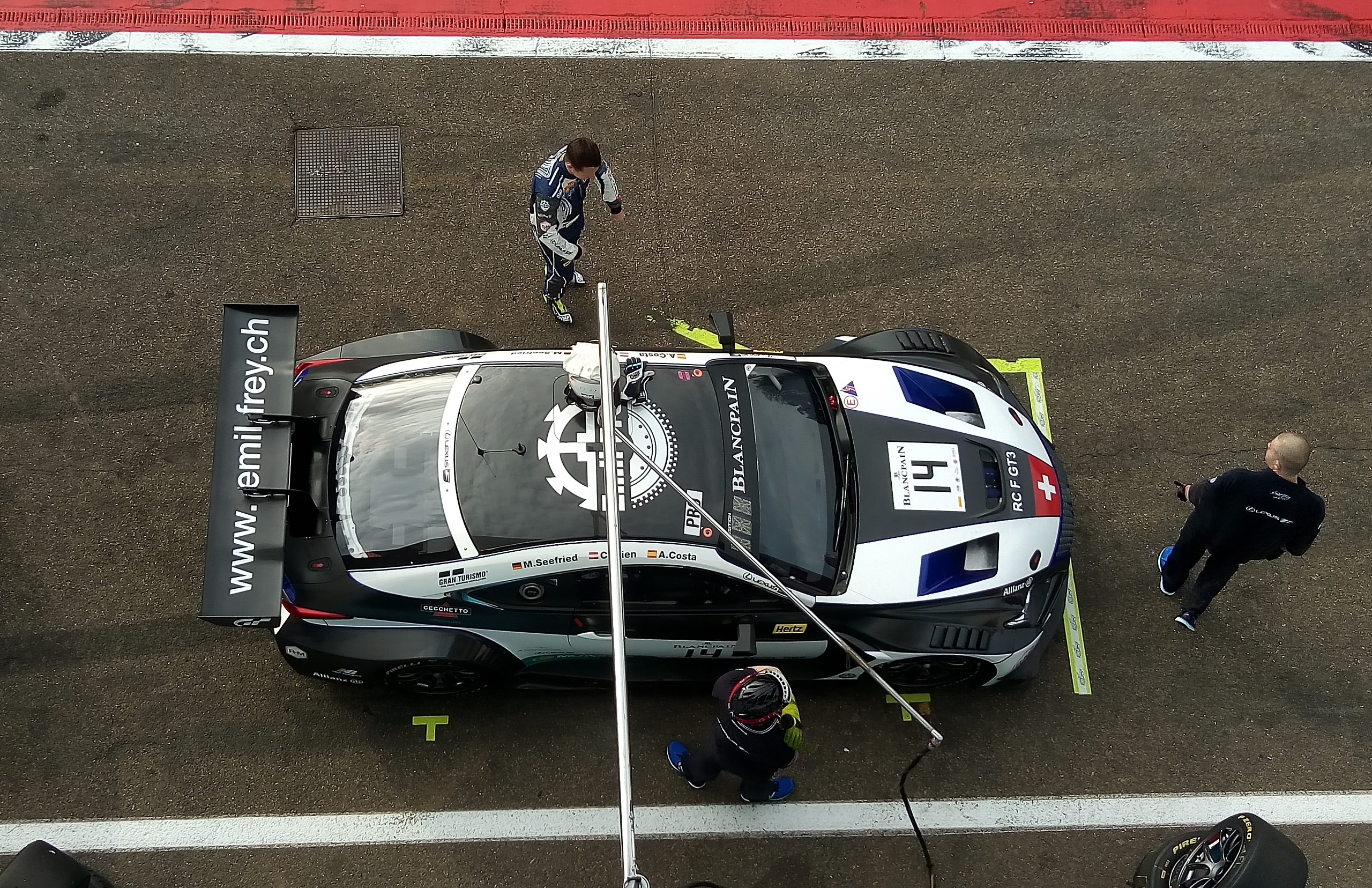
Klien in the pits at Circuit Zolder, in the Blancpain GT Series

After Formula One, Klien began racing in a number of categories including endurance racing, sports cars and V8 Supercars. He was close to a deal with Peugeot to race in the World Endurance Championship in 2012 before the French company withdrew from racing.

Klien has taken part in a number of V8 Supercar drives, including the Bathurst 1000 where he teamed up with Russell Ingall.

Since late 2012, Klien writes a monthly column for the Pitpass.com website.

In 2014, Klien signed a deal with NewBlood By Morand Racing to race in their 2014 ELMS campaign.

In 2017, Klien joined the Bundesheer (Austrian Armed Forces) and will continue his racing career in addition to military service. He became an expert for ServusTV's coverage of Formula One from the start of the 2021 season.

Klien competed in the 2021 Deutsche Tourenwagen Masters part-time by driving a McLaren for the Polish JP Motorsport team in a total of three two-race rounds. After making his debut in the third round at Zolder, he returned to the grid in the next round at the Nürburgring and in the sixth round at Assen. His fifth-place finish in the first race at Assen was his only top-ten finish in six races.

In 2022, Klien continued racing GT3 machineries for JP Motorsport, making a switch to GT World Challenge Europe Endurance Cup and GT World Challenge Europe Sprint Cup.

== Racing record ==
=== Career summary ===
Season	Series	Team	Races	Poles	Wins	Points	Position
1999	Formula BMW Junior	ADAC Sport München	20	1	3	193	4th
2000	Formula BMW ADAC	Team Rosberg	19	0	0	57	10th
2001	Formula BMW ADAC	Team Rosberg	19	3	5	232	**3rd**
2002	Formula Renault 2000 Eurocup	JD Motorsport	8	0	0	92	6th
2002	Formula Renault 2000 Germany	JD Motorsport	14	2	4	278	**1st**
2003	Formula 3 Euro Series	Mücke Motorsport	20	6	3	89	**2nd**
2003	Masters of Formula 3	Mücke Motorsport	1	0	1	N/A	**1st**
2004	Formula One	Jaguar Racing	18	0	0	3	16th
2005	Formula One	Red Bull Racing	15	0	0	9	15th
2006	Formula One	Red Bull Racing	15	0	0	2	18th
2007	Formula One	Honda F1 Team	Test driver				
2007	Formula One	Spyker F1 Team	Test driver				
2008	24 Hours of Le Mans	Peugeot Sport Total	1	0	0	N/A	**3rd**
2008	American Le Mans Series	Team Peugeot Total	1	1	0	26	17th
2008	Formula One	BMW Sauber F1 Team	Test/Reserve driver				
2009	24 Hours of Le Mans	Team Peugeot Total	1	0	0	N/A	6th
2009	American Le Mans Series	Team Peugeot Total	1	0	0	20	25th
2009	Le Mans Series	Team Peugeot Total	1	1	1	11	19th
2009	Formula One	BMW Sauber F1 Team	Test driver				
2010	Formula One	Hispania Racing F1 Team	3	0	0	0	27th
2011	24 Hours of Le Mans	Aston Martin Racing	1	0	0	N/A	NC
2011	Le Mans Series	Aston Martin Racing	1	0	0	0	NC
2012	International V8 Supercars Championship	Walkinshaw Racing	3	0	0	168	51st
2012	International Superstars Series	Swiss Team	2	0	1	32	17th
2013	International Superstars Series	Scuderia Giudici	2	0	0	8	24th
2013	Auto GP	Zele Racing	2	0	0	6	18th
2013	ADAC Procar Series	Liqui Moly Team Engstler	2	1	1	10	6th
2013	European Le Mans Series - LMP2	Morand Racing	2	0	0	28	11th
2014	European Le Mans Series - LMP2	Newblood by Morand Racing	5	0	1	68	**3rd**
2015	FIA World Endurance Championship	Team ByKolles	2	0	0	0	34th
2015	Super GT - GT500	Lexus Team SARD	1	0	0	0	NC
2015	Renault Sport Trophy - Elite Class	Zele Racing	3	0	0	0	NC†
2015	Renault Sport Endurance Trophy	Zele Racing	2	0	0	0	NC†
2016	Blancpain GT Series Endurance Cup	Emil Frey Racing	2	0	0	6	41st
2017	Blancpain GT Series Endurance Cup	Emil Frey Jaguar Racing	5	0	0	1	50th
2017	Intercontinental GT Challenge	Emil Frey Jaguar Racing	1	0	0	0	NC
2018	Blancpain GT Series Sprint Cup	Emil Frey Lexus Racing	10	0	0	15.5	13th
2018	Blancpain GT Series Endurance Cup	Emil Frey Lexus Racing	5	0	1	35	9th
2020	International GT Open	JP Motorsport	12	1	1	68	6th
2020	International GT Open - Pro-Am	JP Motorsport	12	4	4	62	**2nd**
2020	GT World Challenge Europe Endurance Cup	JP Motorsport	2	0	0	0	NC
2020	GT World Challenge Europe Endurance Cup - Pro-Am	JP Motorsport	1	0	0	2	26th
2021	International GT Open	JP Motorsport	6	1	0	22	16th
2021	International GT Open - Pro-Am	JP Motorsport	6	1	2	29	8th
2021	Deutsche Tourenwagen Masters	JP Motorsport	6	0	0	0	NC†
2021	GT World Challenge Europe Endurance Cup	JP Motorsport	1	0	0	0	NC
2022	GT World Challenge Europe Sprint Cup	JP Motorsport	8	0	0	0	NC
2022	GT World Challenge Europe Sprint Cup - Pro-Am	JP Motorsport	8	0	4	99.5	**2nd**
2022	GT World Challenge Europe Endurance Cup	JP Motorsport	4	0	0	10	26th
2022	ADAC GT Masters	JP Motorsport	2	0	0	0	NC†
2023	GT World Challenge Europe Sprint Cup	JP Motorsport	10	0	0	0	NC
2023	24H GT Series - GT3	JP Motorsport	1	0	0	28	7th
2024	Nürburgring Langstrecken-Serie - TCR	JP Motorsport					
2025	Nürburgring Langstrecken-Serie - SP9	Eastalent Racing Team					
2025	24 Hours of Nürburgring - SP9	Eastalent Racing Team	1	0	0	N/A	6th

^{†} As Klien was a guest driver, he was ineligible to score points.
^{*} Season still in progress.

=== Complete Formula Renault 2000 Germany results ===
(key)

Year	Entrant	1	2	3	4	5	6	7	8	9	10	11	12	13	14	DC	Points
2002	JD Motorsport	OSC1; 1; 1	OSC1; 2; 1	HOC; 1; 2	HOC; 2; 1	LAU; 1; 2	LAU; 2; 2	**NÜR1**; **1**; 2	NÜR1; 2; 19	SAL; 1; 21	SAL; 2; 17	**NÜR2**; **1**; 1	NÜR2; 2; 3	OSC2; 1; 9	OSC2; 2; 2	1st	278

=== Complete Formula Renault 2000 Eurocup results ===
(key)

Year	Entrant	1	2	3	4	5	6	7	8	9	DC	Points
2002	JD Motorsport	MAG; 4	SIL; Ret	JAR; 9	AND; 4	OSC; 5	SPA; DNS	IMO; 5	DON; 2	EST; 7	6th	92

=== Complete Formula 3 Euro Series results ===
(key)

Year	Entrant	Chassis	Engine	1	2	3	4	5	6	7	8	9	10	11	12	13	14	15	16	17	18	19	20	DC	Points
2003	ADAC Berlin-Brandenburg	Dallara F303/008	HWA-Mercedes	HOC; 1; 4	HOC; 2; 6	**ADR**; **1**; 3	ADR; 2; 21	PAU; 1 Ret	PAU; 2; 7	NOR; 1 Ret	NOR; 2; 10	**LMS**; **1**; 2	LMS; 2; 1	**NÜR**; **1** Ret	**NÜR**; **2**; 1	A1R; 1; 5	A1R; 2; 5	**ZAN**; **1**; 1	**ZAN**; **2**; 2	HOC; 3; 23	HOC; 4; 3	MAG; 1 Ret	MAG; 2; 3	2nd	89

=== Complete Formula One results ===
(key)

Year	Entrant	Chassis	Engine	1	2	3	4	5	6	7	8	9	10	11	12	13	14	15	16	17	18	19	WDC	Points
2004	Jaguar Racing	Jaguar R5	Cosworth CR-6 3.0 V10	AUS; 11	MAL; 10	BHR; 14	SMR; 14	ESP; Ret	MON; Ret	EUR; 12	CAN; 9	USA; Ret	FRA; 11	GBR; 14	GER; 10	HUN; 13	BEL; 6	ITA; 13		JPN; 12	BRA; 14		16th	3
2004	Jaguar Racing	Jaguar R5B	Cosworth CR-6 3.0 V10																CHN; Ret				16th	3
2005	Red Bull Racing	Red Bull RB1	Cosworth TJ2005 3.0 V10	AUS; 7	MAL; 8	BHR; DNS	SMR; TD	ESP; TD	MON; TD	EUR; TD	CAN; 8	USA; DNS	FRA; Ret	GBR; 15	GER; 9	HUN; Ret	TUR; 8	ITA; 13	BEL; 9	BRA; 9	JPN; 9	CHN; 5	15th	9
2006	Red Bull Racing	Red Bull RB2	Ferrari 056 2.4 V8	BHR; 8	MAL; Ret	AUS; Ret	SMR; Ret	EUR; Ret	ESP; 13	MON; Ret	GBR; 14	CAN; 11	USA; Ret	FRA; 12	GER; 8	HUN; Ret	TUR; 11	ITA; 11	CHN	JPN	BRA		18th	2
2007	Honda Racing F1 Team	Honda RA107	Honda RA807E 2.4 V8	AUS	MAL	BHR	ESP	MON	CAN	USA	FRA	GBR; TD	EUR	HUN	TUR	ITA	BEL	JPN	CHN	BRA			–	–
2010	Hispania Racing F1 Team	Hispania F110	Cosworth CA2010 2.4 V8	BHR	AUS	MAL	CHN	ESP; TD	MON	TUR	CAN	EUR; TD	GBR	GER	HUN	BEL	ITA	SIN; Ret	JPN	KOR	BRA; 22	ABU; 20	27th	0

=== Sports/Touring car racing ===
==== Le Mans 24 Hours results ====
Year	Team	Co-drivers	Car	Class	Laps	Pos.	Class pos.
2008	(France) Team Peugeot Total	(France) Franck Montagny (Brazil) Ricardo Zonta	Peugeot 908 HDi FAP	LMP1	379	**3rd**	**3rd**
2009	(France) Team Peugeot Total	(France) Nicolas Minassian (Portugal) Pedro Lamy	Peugeot 908 HDi FAP	LMP1	369	6th	6th
2011	(United Kingdom) Aston Martin Racing	(Germany) Stefan Mücke (United Kingdom) Darren Turner	Aston Martin AMR-One	LMP1	4	DNF	DNF
2014	(Switzerland) Newblood by Morand Racing	(France) Gary Hirsch (France) Romain Brandela	Morgan LMP2-Judd	LMP2	352	10th	6th

==== American Le Mans Series results ====
Year	Entrant	Class	Chassis	Engine	1	2	3	4	5	6	7	8	9	10	11	Rank	Points
2008	Team Peugeot Total	LMP1	Peugeot 908 HDi FAP	Peugeot HDi 5.5 L V12 (Diesel)	SEB	STP	LNB	UTA	LIM	MID	AME	MOS	DET	PET; 2	MON	17th	26
2009	Team Peugeot Total	LMP1	Peugeot 908 HDi FAP	Peugeot HDI 5.5 L Turbo V12 (Diesel)	SEB; 4	STP	LNB	UTA	LIM	MID	AME	MOS	PET	MON		25th	20

=== Complete European Le Mans Series results ===
Year	Entrant	Class	Chassis	Engine	1	2	3	4	5	Rank	Points
2009	Team Peugeot Total	LMP1	Peugeot 908 HDi FAP	Peugeot HDI 5.5 L Turbo V12 (Diesel)	CAT	SPA; 1	ALG	NÜR	SIL	19th	11
2011	Aston Martin Racing	LMP1	Lola-Aston Martin B09/60	Aston Martin AM04 6.0 L V12	CAS	SPA	IMO	SIL^{1} 9	EST	NC	0
2013	Morand Racing	LMP2	Morgan LMP2	Judd HK 3.6 L V8	SIL	IMO	RBR	HUN; 5	LEC; 2	11th	28
2014	Newblood by Morand Racing	LMP2	Morgan LMP2	Judd HK 3.6 L V8	SIL; 3	IMO; Ret	RBR; 5	LEC; 1	EST; 2	3rd	68

^{1} Driver run for the Intercontinental Le Mans Cup, no points awarded for the Le Mans Series.

=== Complete V8 Supercar results ===
Year	Team	1	2	3	4	5	6	7	8	9	10	11	12	13	14	15	16	17	18	19	20	21	22	23	24	25	26	27	28	29	30	31	Pos	Points
2011	Rod Nash Racing	YMC; R1	YMC; R2	ADE; R3	ADE; R4	HAM; R5	HAM; R6	BAR; R7	BAR; R8	BAR; R9	WIN; R10	WIN; R11	HID; R12	HID; R13	TOW; R14	TOW; R15	QLD; R16	QLD; R17	QLD; R18	PHI; Q	PHI; R19	BAT; R20	SUR; R21; 15	SUR; R22; Ret	SYM; R23	SYM; R24	SAN; R25	SAN; R26	SYD; R27	SYD; R28			77th	60
2012	Walkinshaw Racing	ADE; R1	ADE; R2	SYM; R3	SYM; R4	HAM; R5	HAM; R6	BAR; R7	BAR; R8	BAR; R9	PHI; R10; PO	PHI; R11; PO	HID; R12	HID; R13	TOW; R14; PO	TOW; R15; PO	QLD; R16	QLD; R17	SMP; R18	SMP; R19	SAN; Q 19	SAN; R20; 11	BAT; R21; 9	SUR; R22	SUR; R23	YMC; R24	YMC; R25	YMC; R26	WIN; R27	WIN; R28	SYD; R29	SYD; R30	51st	168

=== Complete Bathurst 1000 results ===
Year	Team	Car	Co-driver	Position	Laps
2012	Walkinshaw Racing	Holden Commodore VE	(Australia) Russell Ingall	9th	161

=== Complete International Superstars Series results ===
(key) (Races in bold indicate pole position) (Races in italics indicate fastest lap)

Year	Team	Car	1	2	3	4	5	6	7	8	9	10	11	12	13	14	15	16	DC	Points
2012	Swiss Team	Maserati Quattroporte	MNZ; 1	MNZ; 2	IMO; 1	IMO; 2	DON; 1	DON; 2	MUG; 1	MUG; 2	HUN; 1; 4	HUN; 2; 1	SPA; 1	SPA; 2	VAL; 1	VAL; 2	PER; 1	PER; 2	17th	32
2013	Scuderia Giudici	BMW M3 (E92)	MNZ; 1	MNZ; 2	BRN; 1 Ret	BRN; 2; 6	SVK; 1	SVK; 2	ZOL; 1	ZOL; 2	ALG; 1	ALG; 2	DON; 1	DON; 2	IMO; 1	IMO; 2	VAL; 1	VAL; 2	24th	8

=== Complete Auto GP results ===
(key) (Races in bold indicate pole position) (Races in italics indicate fastest lap)

Year	Entrant	1	2	3	4	5	6	7	8	9	10	11	12	13	14	15	16	Pos	Points
2013	Zele Racing	MNZ; 1	MNZ; 2	MAR; 1	MAR; 2	HUN; 1	HUN; 2	SIL; 1	SIL; 2	MUG; 1; 8	MUG; 2; 9	NÜR; 1	NÜR; 2	DON; 1	DON; 2	BRN; 1	BRN; 2	18th	6

=== Complete FIA World Endurance Championship results ===
Year	Entrant	Class	Chassis	Engine	1	2	3	4	5	6	7	8	Rank	Points
2015	Team ByKolles	LMP1	CLM P1/01	AER P60 Turbo V6	SIL; Ret	SPA; Ret	LMS	NÜR	COA	FUJ	SHA	BHR	34th	0

=== Complete Super GT results ===
(key) (Races in bold indicate pole position) (Races in italics indicate fastest lap)

Year	Team	Car	Class	1	2	3	4	5	6	7	8	DC	Points
2015	Lexus Team SARD	Lexus RC F	GT500	OKA	FUJ	CHA	FUJ	SUZ; 11	SUG	AUT	MOT	NC	0

=== Complete GT World Challenge Europe Sprint Cup results ===
Year	Team	Car	Class	1	2	3	4	5	6	7	8	9	10	Pos.	Points
2018	Emil Frey Lexus Racing	Lexus RC F GT3	Pro	ZOL; 1 Ret	ZOL; 2; 20	BRH; 1; 11	BRH; 2; 14	MIS; 1; 9	MIS; 2 Ret	HUN; 1; 6	HUN; 2; 13	NÜR; 1; 5	NÜR; 2; 7	13th	15.5
2022	JP Motorsport	McLaren 720S GT3	Pro-Am	BRH; 1; 16	BRH; 2; 17	MAG; 1; 21	MAG; 2; 17	ZAN; 1; 18	ZAN; 2 Ret	MIS; 1	MIS; 2	VAL; 1; 15	VAL; 2; 16	2nd	99.5
2023	JP Motorsport	McLaren 720S GT3	Pro	BRH; 1; 21	BRH; 2; 11	MIS; 1 Ret	MIS; 2; 37†	HOC; 1; 30†	HOC; 2 Ret	VAL; 1; 13	VAL; 2; 11	ZAN; 1; 23	ZAN; 2; 18	NC	0

^{†} Driver did not finish the race, but was classified as he completed over 90% of the race distance.

=== Complete Deutsche Tourenwagen Masters results ===
(key) (Races in bold indicate pole position) (Races in italics indicate fastest lap)

Year	Team	Car	1	2	3	4	5	6	7	8	9	10	11	12	13	14	15	16	Pos	Points
2021	JP Motorsport	McLaren 720S GT3	MNZ; 1	MNZ; 2	LAU; 1	LAU; 2	ZOL; 1; 12	ZOL; 2; 14	NÜR; 1; 15	NÜR; 2; 12	RBR; 1	RBR; 2	ASS; 1; 5	ASS; 2 Ret	HOC; 1	HOC; 2	NOR; 1	NOR; 2	NC†	0†

^{†} As Klien was a guest driver, he was ineligible to score points.

== See also ==
- List of Austrians in sports
- Famous Austrians

== Notes ==
Sporting positions
Preceded by Marcel Lasée	Formula Renault 2000 Germany; Champion; 2002	Succeeded by Ryan Sharp
Preceded by Fábio Carbone	Masters of Formula 3 Winner; 2003	Succeeded by Alexandre Prémat
