= 2006 Bahrain Grand Prix =

Coordinates: 26°01′57″N 50°30′38″E

Race 1 of 18 in the 2006 Formula One World Championship
← Previous race	Next race →
- The Bahrain Circuit in Sakhir

Race details
- Date: 12 March 2006
- Official name: 2006 Formula 1 Gulf Air Bahrain Grand Prix
- Location: Bahrain International Circuit; Sakhir, Bahrain
- Course: Permanent racing facility
- Course length: 5.412 km (3.363 miles)
- Distance: 57 laps, 308.238 km (191.530 miles)
- Weather: Fine, Dry and Hot; Air Temp 23 °C (73 °F); Track Temp 40 °C (104 °F) dropping to 34 °C (93 °F)
- Attendance: 77,000 (Weekend)

Pole position
Driver	(Germany) Michael Schumacher	Ferrari
- Time: 1:31.431

Fastest lap
Driver	(Germany) Nico Rosberg	Williams-Cosworth
- Time: 1:32.408 on lap 42

Podium
First	(Spain) Fernando Alonso	Renault
Second	(Germany) Michael Schumacher	Ferrari
Third	(Finland) Kimi Räikkönen	McLaren-Mercedes

The 2006 Bahrain Grand Prix (officially the 2006 Formula 1 Gulf Air Bahrain Grand Prix) was a Formula One motor race held at the Bahrain International Circuit in Sakhir, Bahrain on 12 March 2006. The 57-lap race was the opening round of the 2006 Formula One season and the third running of the Bahrain Grand Prix. It was won by the 2005 World Champions, Fernando Alonso and the Renault team. Ferrari driver and polesitter Michael Schumacher began his final season in Formula One (before his return with Mercedes in 2010) with second position. Kimi Räikkönen completed the podium after he finished in third place with the McLaren team, despite starting in last position.

The race was the first Grand Prix for future world champion Nico Rosberg, son of World Champion Keke Rosberg, who raced with the Williams team. He set the fastest lap of the race and, at the age of 20 years and 258 days, broke the record for the youngest driver to do so, which he held until Max Verstappen scored his first fastest lap, at age 19, at the 2016 Brazilian Grand Prix. It was also the debut race for the BMW Sauber, Toro Rosso, Midland F1 and Super Aguri teams, and drivers Scott Speed and Yuji Ide. This race was also the debut of the new 2.4 litre naturally aspirated V8 engine configuration in the sport which was used by 10 of the 11 teams entered into the race, and would remain in service in F1 until the end of the 2013 season.

== Report ==
=== Background ===
This was the first race for the Midland, BMW Sauber, Toro Rosso, Honda F1 and Super Aguri teams, although only Super Aguri was a completely new team, the others all representing buyouts or rebrandings of existing teams. Along with Rosberg, Scott Speed and Yuji Ide were also making their Grand Prix débuts.

It also saw the début of the 2.4 litre (146.4 cu in) naturally-aspirated V8 engines which were used by all teams except Toro Rosso, who were still using the 3.0 litre (183 cu in) V10 engines that were used from 1995 to 2005, as the team's chassis, the STR1, was reused from the Red Bull RB1 from the 2005 season. This race notably marked the first time teams had fielded V8-powered cars, since the 1997 European Grand Prix.

Ben Edwards left BBC Radio 5 Live after 2005 and was replaced by David Croft. Meanwhile on the ITV front, Jim Rosenthal was also gone and was replaced by Steve Rider in his first race as anchor since the 1996 Japanese Grand Prix.

=== Friday drivers ===
The bottom six teams in the 2005 Constructors' Championship and Super Aguri were entitled to run a third car in free practice on Friday. These drivers drove on Friday but did not compete in qualifying or the race.

Constructor	Nat	Driver
Williams-Cosworth	(Austria)	Alexander Wurz
Honda	(United Kingdom)	Anthony Davidson
Red Bull-Ferrari	(Netherlands)	Robert Doornbos
BMW Sauber	(Poland)	Robert Kubica
MF1-Toyota	(Germany)	Markus Winkelhock
Toro Rosso-Cosworth	(Switzerland)	Neel Jani

=== Qualifying ===
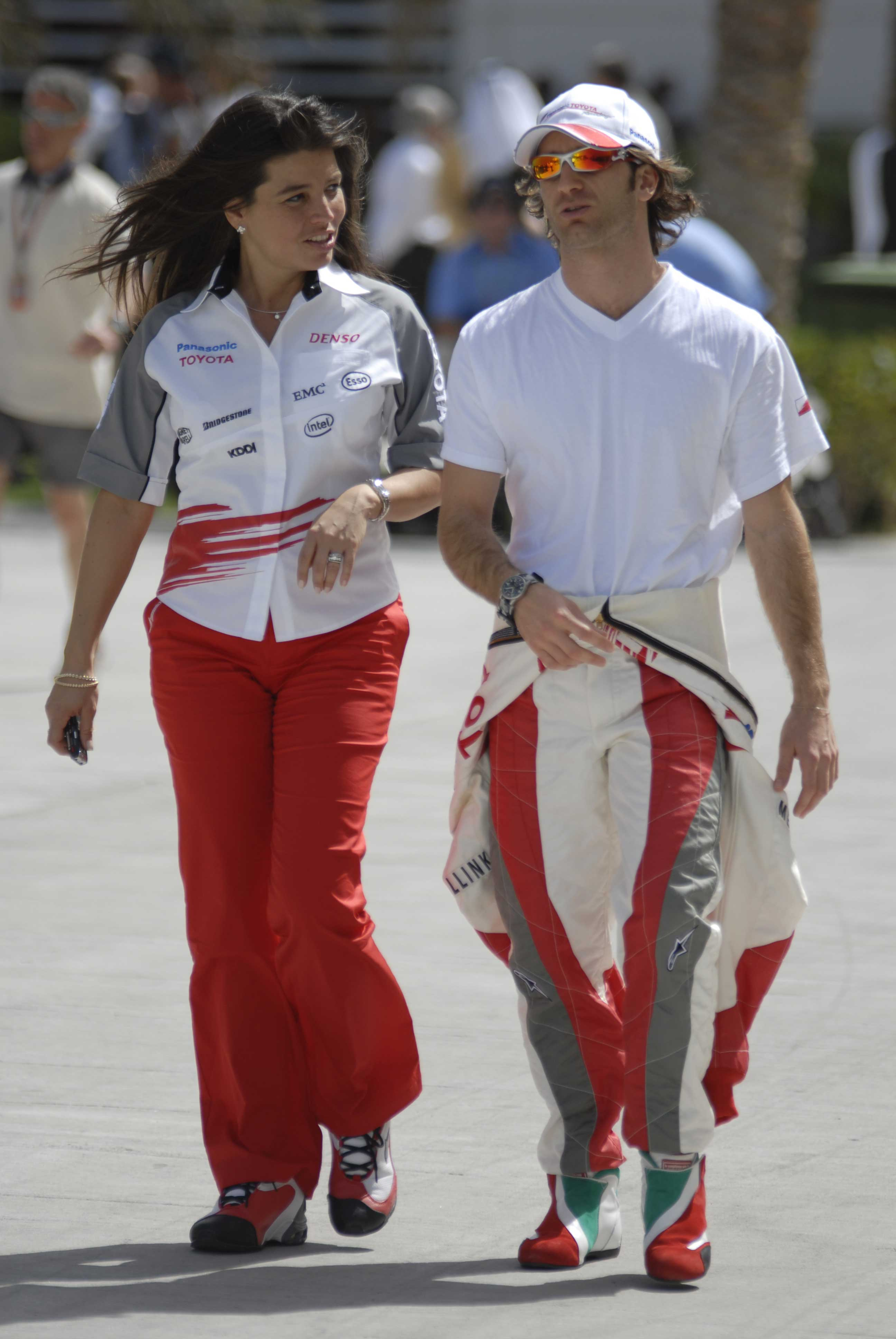
Toyota driver Jarno Trulli before the start of the race.

The race was the first run under the new 2006 qualifying rules, in which the one-hour session is split into three 'knock out' parts. The first part eliminated Kimi Räikkönen (rear wishbone failure) and Ralf Schumacher, who was caught out by the red flag after Räikkönen's accident and failed to set a competitive time, as well as the MF1's and the two Super Aguris. The second part saw fewer surprises, with the expected runners lining up for the final top 10 part. The result was that the Ferraris swept the front row.

=== Race ===
At the start of the race, Fernando Alonso moved up to second in the first lap, only for Michael Schumacher to begin to pull away. Alonso was involved in a near collision with Schumacher's teammate Felipe Massa, who spun at the first corner. Massa was never a threat after this point, not helped by a delay in his pit stop to change tyres the same lap. Alonso's teammate Giancarlo Fisichella also played little part in the race due to an engine mapping problem which restricted power. He retired on the 21st lap due to hydraulic failure. A live team radio broadcast in which the team informed him that he would have to cope with the engine as well as he could led to Fisichella swearing in response; this incident resulted in future team radio broadcasts being time-delayed. To the surprise of few, Kimi Räikkönen quickly moved his way up the field, only being delayed by Jacques Villeneuve and Fisichella for a short period of time, before passing both men.

Further down the field, Nick Heidfeld and Nico Rosberg, who was making his Grand Prix début, touched at the first corner. Both men were significantly delayed, but recovered. Heidfeld's day continued to get worse, as an incident with David Coulthard was investigated after the race.

Juan Pablo Montoya finished 5th in his McLaren, having never been a threat throughout the race. It was a good day for Williams on a whole, as Mark Webber finished in 6th, while Rosberg was the surprise of the race though, ending up a very respectable 7th, passing Christian Klien after catching him in the last few laps of the race, putting Klien down to a still impressive 8th. Rosberg set the fastest lap of the race, becoming the youngest driver ever to achieve this in a Grand Prix, breaking a record held by Alonso.

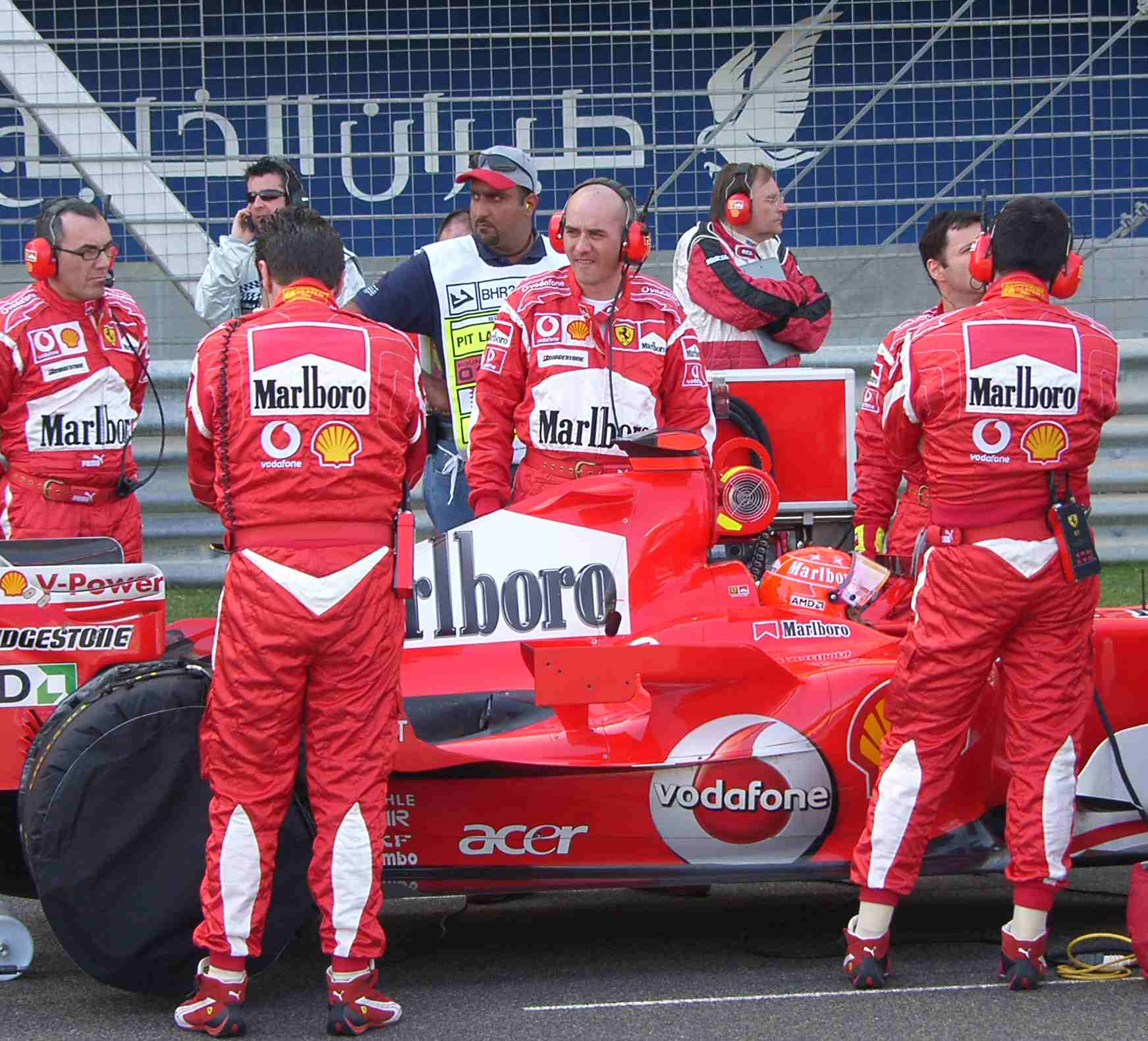
Michael Schumacher started on pole for Ferrari and finished the race in second position.

Honda suffered mixed fortunes throughout the race. Early on fans were treated to a fight between Rubens Barrichello and Jenson Button, as Button slipped down the order due to a slow getaway. Button eventually fought his way back up, twice passing Juan Pablo Montoya at the end of the straight but losing out again in pitstops. He eventually finished 4th, 0.6 seconds behind Räikkönen in 3rd. Räikkönen fought hard throughout the race, stopping only once on his way to the last podium spot. He rose 19 places in the race which is more than any driver since Fabrizio Barbazza started 25th and finished sixth in the 1993 San Marino Grand Prix.

At the second set of pit stops, Alonso was able to take advantage of staying out longer than Schumacher by coming out of the pit lane side by side with Schumacher. As they came into the first corner both cars were neck and neck, but Alonso was able to pull out in front of the former world champion. Despite coming under heavy pressure from Schumacher towards the end, the reigning champion started off the season with a well earned victory.

After a tussle with David Coulthard, Nick Heidfeld was reprimanded by stewards post-race for positioning his car in a way that forced Coulthard off the race circuit. Coulthard suffered engine failure on cool-down lap and received a 10-place grid penalty for 2006 Malaysian Grand Prix.

== Classification ==
=== Qualifying ===
Pos.	No.	Driver	Constructor	Q1	Q2	Q3	Grid
1	5	(Germany) Michael Schumacher	Ferrari	1:33.310	1:32.025	1:31.431	1
2	6	(Brazil) Felipe Massa	Ferrari	1:33.579	1:32.014	1:31.478	2
3	12	(United Kingdom) Jenson Button	Honda	1:32.603	1:32.025	1:31.549	3
4	1	(Spain) Fernando Alonso	Renault	1:32.433	1:31.215	1:31.702	4
5	4	(Colombia) Juan Pablo Montoya	McLaren-Mercedes	1:33.233	1:31.487	1:32.164	5
6	11	(Brazil) Rubens Barrichello	Honda	1:33.922	1:32.322	1:32.579	6
7	9	(Australia) Mark Webber	Williams-Cosworth	1:33.454	1:32.309	1:33.006	7
8	15	(Austria) Christian Klien	Red Bull-Ferrari	1:34.308	1:32.106	1:33.112	8
9	2	(Italy) Giancarlo Fisichella	Renault	1:32.934	1:31.831	1:33.496	9
10	16	(Germany) Nick Heidfeld	BMW Sauber	1:33.374	1:31.958	1:33.926	10
11	17	(Canada) Jacques Villeneuve	BMW Sauber	1:33.882	1:32.456		11
12	10	(Germany) Nico Rosberg	Williams-Cosworth	1:32.945	1:32.620		12
13	14	(United Kingdom) David Coulthard	Red Bull-Ferrari	1:33.678	1:32.850		13
14	8	(Italy) Jarno Trulli	Toyota	1:33.987	1:33.066		14
15	20	(Italy) Vitantonio Liuzzi	Toro Rosso-Cosworth	1:34.439	1:33.416		15
16	21	(United States) Scott Speed	Toro Rosso-Cosworth	1:33.995	1:34.606		16
17	7	(Germany) Ralf Schumacher	Toyota	1:34.702			17
18	19	(Netherlands) Christijan Albers	MF1-Toyota	1:35.724			18
19	18	(Portugal) Tiago Monteiro	MF1-Toyota	1:35.900			19
20	22	(Japan) Takuma Sato	Super Aguri-Honda	1:37.411			20
21	23	(Japan) Yuji Ide	Super Aguri-Honda	1:40.270			21
22	3	(Finland) Kimi Räikkönen	McLaren-Mercedes	No time^{1}			22

Notes

- ^1 — Kimi Räikkönen suffered a right rear suspension failure during his first timed lap. The suspension failure, which was due to a manufacturing fault, red flagged the session and ended Räikkönen's qualifying session.

=== Race ===
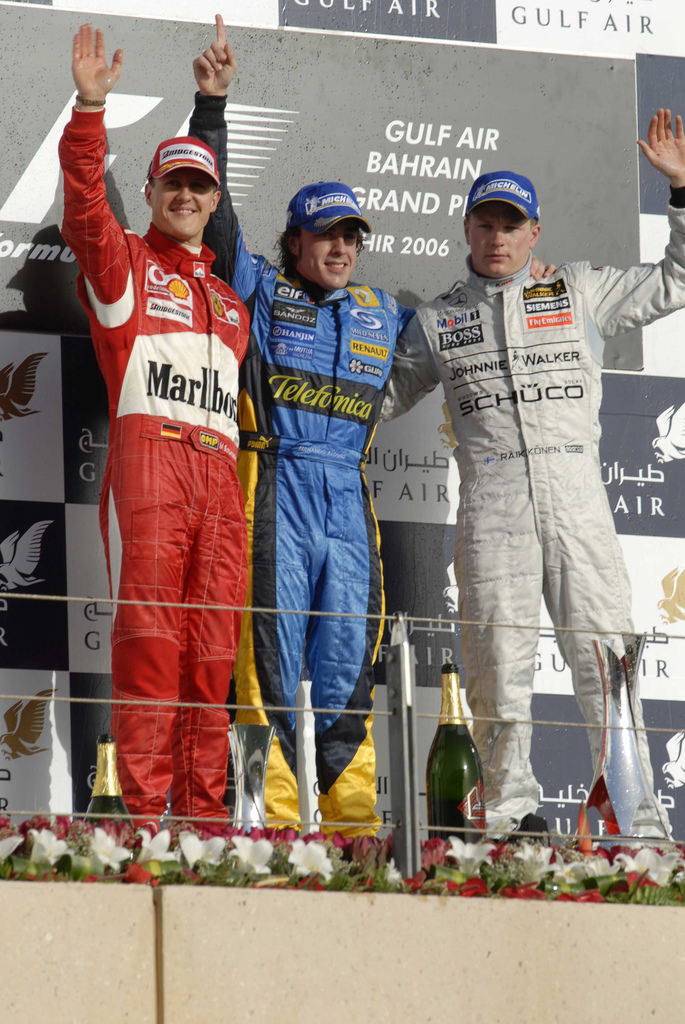
The podium ceremony after the race.

Pos	No	Driver	Constructor	Tyre	Laps	Time/Retired	Grid	Points
1	1	(Spain) Fernando Alonso	Renault	M	57	1:29:46.205	4	10
2	5	(Germany) Michael Schumacher	Ferrari	B	57	+1.246	1	8
3	3	(Finland) Kimi Räikkönen	McLaren-Mercedes	M	57	+19.360	22	6
4	12	(United Kingdom) Jenson Button	Honda	M	57	+19.992	3	5
5	4	(Colombia) Juan Pablo Montoya	McLaren-Mercedes	M	57	+37.048	5	4
6	9	(Australia) Mark Webber	Williams-Cosworth	B	57	+41.932	7	3
7	10	(Germany) Nico Rosberg	Williams-Cosworth	B	57	+1:03.043	12	2
8	15	(Austria) Christian Klien	Red Bull-Ferrari	M	57	+1:06.771	8	1
9	6	(Brazil) Felipe Massa	Ferrari	B	57	+1:09.907	2	
10	14	(United Kingdom) David Coulthard	Red Bull-Ferrari	M	57	+1:15.541	13	
11	20	(Italy) Vitantonio Liuzzi	Toro Rosso-Cosworth	M	57	+1:25.997	15	
12	16	(Germany) Nick Heidfeld	BMW Sauber	M	56	+1 Lap	10	
13	21	(United States) Scott Speed	Toro Rosso-Cosworth	M	56	+1 Lap	16	
14	7	(Germany) Ralf Schumacher	Toyota	B	56	+1 Lap	17	
15	11	(Brazil) Rubens Barrichello	Honda	M	56	+1 Lap	6	
16	8	(Italy) Jarno Trulli	Toyota	B	56	+1 Lap	14	
17	18	(Portugal) Tiago Monteiro	MF1-Toyota	B	55	+2 Laps	PL^{2}	
18	22	(Japan) Takuma Sato	Super Aguri-Honda	B	53	+4 Laps	20	
Ret	23	(Japan) Yuji Ide	Super Aguri-Honda	B	35	Engine	21	
Ret	17	(Canada) Jacques Villeneuve	BMW Sauber	M	29	Engine	11	
Ret	2	(Italy) Giancarlo Fisichella	Renault	M	21	Hydraulics	9	
Ret	19	(Netherlands) Christijan Albers	MF1-Toyota	B	0	Driveshaft	18	

Notes

- ^2 — Tiago Monteiro suffered transmission failure on the way to the grid, so swapped to the T-car and started from the pitlane.

== Notes ==
- First win for V8-powered car since 1994 European Grand Prix.

== Championship standings after the race ==
Drivers' Championship standings

Pos.	Driver	Points
1	(Spain) Fernando Alonso	10
2	(Germany) Michael Schumacher	8
3	(Finland) Kimi Räikkönen	6
4	(United Kingdom) Jenson Button	5
5	(Colombia) Juan Pablo Montoya	4

Constructors' Championship standings

Pos.	Constructor	Points
1	(France) Renault	10
2	(United Kingdom) McLaren-Mercedes	10
3	(Italy) Ferrari	8
4	(Japan) Honda	5
5	(United Kingdom) Williams-Cosworth	5

- Note: Only the top five positions are included for both sets of standings.

Previous race: 2005 Chinese Grand Prix	FIA Formula One World Championship; 2006 season	Next race: 2006 Malaysian Grand Prix
Previous race: 2005 Bahrain Grand Prix	Bahrain Grand Prix	Next race: 2007 Bahrain Grand Prix
