= 2013 ADAC Procar Series =

Motor racing competition in Germany

The 2013 ADAC Procar Series season was the nineteenth season of the ADAC Procar Series, the German championship for Super 2000 touring cars. The season consisted of eight separate race weekends with two races each, spread over eight different tracks.

== Teams and drivers ==
Team	Car	No.	Drivers	Rounds
Division 1
(Germany) Thate Motorsport	BMW 320si E90	1	(Germany) Jens Guido Weimann	All
(Germany) Liqui Moly Team Engstler	BMW 320si E90	3	(Germany) Johannes Leidinger	All
(Germany) Liqui Moly Team Engstler	BMW 320si E90	4	(Germany) Michael Bräutigam	1
(Germany) Liqui Moly Team Engstler	BMW 320si E90	20	(Austria) Christian Klien	2
(Germany) Liqui Moly Team Engstler	BMW 320si E90	21	(Germany) Guido Naumann	3
(Germany) Liqui Moly Team Engstler	BMW 320si E90	22	(Germany) Reiner Kuhn	5
(Germany) Liqui Moly Team Engstler	BMW 320si E90	24	(Germany) Tim Schrick	7
(Germany) Liqui Moly Team Engstler	BMW 320si E90	25	(Germany) Thomas Winkelhock	8
(Germany) Liqui Moly Team Engstler	BMW 320si E90	27	(Germany) Mark Warnecke	6
(Switzerland) Vukovic Motorsport	BMW 320si E90	8	(Switzerland) Milenko Vukovic	1, 3
(Switzerland) Huggler Motorsport	BMW 320i E46	9	(Switzerland) Markus Huggler	1–4, 8
(Germany) RSK-Motorsport	BMW 320si E90	10	(Netherlands) Ardi Van der Hoek	1–4
Division 2
(Germany) ETH Tuning	Peugeot 207 Sport	30	(Austria) David Griessner	All
(Germany) ETH Tuning	Peugeot 207 Sport	31	(Germany) Guido Thierfelder	1–3
(Germany) ETH Tuning	Peugeot 207 Sport	45	(Germany) Norbert Heinz	4
(Germany) ETH Tuning	Peugeot 207 Sport	32	(Germany) Andreas Rinke	5–7
(Germany) ETH Tuning	Citroën Saxo VTS	32	(Germany) Andreas Rinke	1–4, 8
(Germany) ETH Tuning	Citroën Saxo VTS	47	(Germany) Arno Dahm	6–7
(Germany) Liqui Moly Team Engstler	Ford Fiesta 1.6 16V	33	(Germany) Julia Trampert	All
(Germany) Liqui Moly Team Engstler	Ford Fiesta 1.6 16V	34	(Denmark) Thomas Krebs	2–8
(Germany) RSK-Motorsport	Ford Fiesta ST	35	(Germany) Pascal Hoffmann	1–4
(Germany) NK Racing Team	Ford Fiesta ST	35	(Germany) Pascal Hoffmann	6–8
(Germany) NK Racing Team	Ford Fiesta ST	46	(Germany) Ronny Reinsberger	2–4, 6–8
(Germany) Kowalski Racing	Ford Fiesta ST	37	(Germany) Michael Kowalski	1, 3–4, 6, 8
(Germany) Lafia Motorsport	Citroën C2 VTS	38	(Germany) Olaf Müller	1, 3–4
(Germany) Lafia Motorsport	Citroën C2 VTS	50	(Germany) Norbert Fuchs	8
(Germany) Glatzel Racing	Ford Fiesta ST	39	(Germany) Kai Jordan	2–6, 8
(Germany) Glatzel Racing	Ford Fiesta ST	40	(Belarus) Yury Krauchuk	All
(Germany) Glatzel Racing	Ford Fiesta ST	41	(Ukraine) Oleksandr Danylchenko	8
(Germany) Glatzel Racing	Ford Fiesta 1.6 16V	42	(Germany) Ralf Glatzel	All
(Germany) Mierschke Motorsport	Ford Fiesta 1.6 16V	48	(Germany) Nils Mierschke	2, 5–6, 8
(Germany) Rennsportteam Großmann	Ford Fiesta ST	49	(Germany) Steffen Großmann	3

== Race calendar and results ==
Round		Circuit	Date	Pole position	Fastest lap	Winning driver	Winning team
1	R1	(Germany) Motorsport Arena Oschersleben	28 April	(Germany) Johannes Leidinger	(Germany) Jens Guido Weimann	(Switzerland) Markus Huggler	(Switzerland) Huggler Motorsport
1	R2	(Germany) Motorsport Arena Oschersleben	28 April		(Germany) Johannes Leidinger	(Germany) Jens Guido Weimann	(Germany) Thate Motorsport
2	R1	(Belgium) Spa-Francorchamps	12 May	(Austria) Christian Klien	(Austria) Christian Klien	(Austria) Christian Klien	(Germany) Liqui Moly Team Engstler
2	R2	(Belgium) Spa-Francorchamps	12 May		(Austria) Christian Klien	(Germany) Johannes Leidinger	(Germany) Liqui Moly Team Engstler
3	R1	(Germany) Sachsenring	9 June	(Germany) Johannes Leidinger	(Germany) Johannes Leidinger	(Germany) Johannes Leidinger	(Germany) Liqui Moly Team Engstler
3	R2	(Germany) Sachsenring	9 June		(Germany) Jens Guido Weimann	(Germany) Jens Guido Weimann	(Germany) Thate Motorsport
4	R1	(Germany) Nürburgring	4 August	(Germany) Johannes Leidinger	(Germany) Jens Guido Weimann	(Germany) Johannes Leidinger	(Germany) Liqui Moly Team Engstler
4	R2	(Germany) Nürburgring	4 August		(Germany) Jens Guido Weimann	(Germany) Johannes Leidinger	(Germany) Liqui Moly Team Engstler
5	R1	(Austria) Red Bull Ring	11 August	(Germany) Johannes Leidinger	(Germany) Johannes Leidinger	(Germany) Johannes Leidinger	(Germany) Liqui Moly Team Engstler
5	R2	(Austria) Red Bull Ring	11 August		(Germany) Johannes Leidinger	(Germany) Johannes Leidinger	(Germany) Liqui Moly Team Engstler
6	R1	(Germany) Lausitzring	1 September	(Germany) Jens Guido Weimann	(Germany) Jens Guido Weimann	(Germany) Jens Guido Weimann	(Germany) Thate Motorsport
6	R2	(Germany) Lausitzring	1 September		(Germany) Jens Guido Weimann	(Germany) Jens Guido Weimann	(Germany) Thate Motorsport
7	R1	Automotodróm Slovakia Ring	15 September	(Germany) Johannes Leidinger	(Germany) Johannes Leidinger	(Germany) Johannes Leidinger	(Germany) Liqui Moly Team Engstler
7	R2	Automotodróm Slovakia Ring	15 September		(Germany) Johannes Leidinger	(Germany) Johannes Leidinger	(Germany) Liqui Moly Team Engstler
8	R1	(Germany) Hockenheimring	30 September	(Germany) Jens Guido Weimann	(Germany) Thomas Winkelhock	(Germany) Thomas Winkelhock	(Germany) Liqui Moly Team Engstler
8	R2	(Germany) Hockenheimring	30 September		(Germany) Thomas Winkelhock	(Germany) Thomas Winkelhock	(Germany) Liqui Moly Team Engstler

== Championship standings ==
=== Drivers' Championship ===
Pos	Driver	OSC (Germany)		SPA (Belgium)		SAC (Germany)		NÜR (Germany)		RBR (Austria)		LAU (Germany)		SVK (Slovakia)		HOC (Germany)		Points
Division 1
1	(Germany) Jens Guido Weimann	3	1	3	2	2	1	3	2	2	2	**1**	1	2	2	**Ret**	DNS	106
2	(Germany) Johannes Leidinger	**Ret**	2	2	1	1	Ret	**1**	1	**1**	1	3	DNS	**1**	1	Ex	Ex	92
3	(Switzerland) Markus Huggler	1	3	5	4	4	2	2	3							2	2	68
4	(Netherlands) Ardi Van der Hoek	4	5	4	3	3	DNS	DNS	DNS									26
5	(Germany) Thomas Winkelhock															1	1	20
6	(Germany) Mark Warnecke											2	2					16
7	(Germany) Michael Bräutigam	2	4															13
8	(Germany) Reiner Kuhn									3	3							12
9	(Austria) Christian Klien			**1**	Ret													10
10	(Germany) Guido Naumann					Ret	3											6
11	(Germany) Tim Schrick													3	3			6
	(Switzerland) Milenko Vukovic	DNS	DNS			DNS	DNS											0
Division 2
1	(Austria) David Griessner	6	6	11	10	**5**	4	4	4	**4**	4	**4**	4	**4**	DNS	Ret	DNS	104
2	(Germany) Ralf Glatzel	5	7	**8**	6	7	5	7	9	6	5	7	7	7	Ret	5	5	89
3	(Germany) Andreas Rinke	7	8	13	11	11	6	**5**	5	8	7	11	8	6	5	**3**	3	81
4	(Belarus) Yury Krauchuk	Ret	10	6	7	6	Ret	6	6	9	6	5	5	5	6	8	4	80
5	(Denmark) Thomas Krebs			12	8	12	8	9	8	7	11	8	6	8	4	7	6	53
6	(Germany) Kai Jordan			7	5	8	7	8	7	10	9	13	Ret			6	Ret	47
7	(Germany) Julia Trampert	9	12	9	9	13	Ret	10	10	11	8	9	9	12	8	10	7	38
8	(Germany) Nils Mierschke			DNS	DNS					5	10	6	Ret			4	Ex	24
9	(Germany) Guido Thierfelder	**8**	9	DNS	Ret	9	Ret											14
10	(Germany) Pascal Hoffmann	11	11	10	Ret	DNS	DNS	12	DNS			Ret	DNS	10	7	DNS	DNS	14
11	(Germany) Ronny Reinsberger			DNS	DNS	10	Ret	11	11			10	10	9	9	DNS	DNS	12
12	(Germany) Michael Kowalski	10	Ret			DNS	DNS	DNS	13			Ret	DNS			11	8	5
13	(Germany) Olaf Müller	12	13			14	9	14	14									5
14	(Ukraine) Oleksandr Danylchenko															9	9	3
15	(Germany) Arno Dahm											12	11	11	10			3
	(Germany) Norbert Heinz							13	12									0
	(Germany) Norbert Fuchs															Ret	DNS	0
	(Germany) Steffen Großmann					DNS	DNS											0
Pos	Driver	OSC (Germany)		SPA (Belgium)		SAC (Germany)		NÜR (Germany)		RBR (Austria)		LAU (Germany)		SVK (Slovakia)		HOC (Germany)		Points

Colour	Result
Gold	Winner
Silver	Second place
Bronze	Third place
Green	Points finish
Blue	Non-points finish
Blue	Non-classified finish (NC)
Purple	Retired (Ret)
Red	Did not qualify (DNQ)
Red	Did not pre-qualify (DNPQ)
Black	Disqualified (DSQ)
White	Did not start (DNS)
White	Withdrew (WD)
White	Race cancelled (C)
Blank	Did not practice (DNP)
Blank	Did not arrive (DNA)
Blank	Excluded (EX)

**Bold** – Pole
Italics – Fastest lap

=== Teams' Championship ===
Pos	Team	OSC (Germany)		SPA (Belgium)		SAC (Germany)		NÜR (Germany)		RBR (Austria)		LAU (Germany)		SVK (Slovakia)		HOC (Germany)		Points
Division 1
1	(Germany) Thate Motorsport	3	1	3	2	2	1	3	2	2	2	1	1	2	2	Ret	DNS	106
2	(Germany) Liqui Moly Team Engstler	Ret	2	2	1	1	Ret	1	1	1	1	3	DNS	1	1	Ex	Ex	92
3	(Switzerland) Huggler Motorsport	1	3	5	4	4	2	2	3							2	2	68
4	(Germany) RSK-Motorsport	4	5	4	3	3	DNS	DNS	DNS									26
	(Switzerland) Vukovic Motorsport	DNS	DNS			DNS	DNS											0
Division 2
1	(Germany) ETH Tuning 1	6	6	11	10	5	4	4	4	4	4	4	4	4	5	3	3	132
2	(Germany) Glatzel Racing 1	5	7	6	6	6	5	6	6	6	5	5	5	5	6	5	4	112
3	(Germany) Liqui Moly Team Engstler	9	12	9	8	12	8	9	8	7	8	8	6	8	4	7	6	65
4	(Germany) Glatzel Racing 2			7	5	8	7	8	7	10	9	13	Ret			6	9	48
5	(Germany) Mierschke Motorsport			DNS	DNS					5	10	6	Ret			4	Ex	24
6	(Germany) ETH Tuning 2	8	9	DNS	Ret	9	Ret	13	12									14
7	(Germany) NK Racing Team			DNS	DNS	10	Ret	11	11			10	10	9	7	DNS	DNS	14
8	(Germany) RSK-Motorsport	11	11	10	Ret	DNS	DNS	12	DNS									9
9	(Germany) Kowalski Racing	10	Ret			DNS	DNS	DNS	13			Ret	DNS			11	8	5
10	(Germany) Lafia Motorsport	12	13			14	9	14	14							Ret	DNS	5
11	(Germany) ETH Tuning 3											12	11	11	10			3
	(Germany) Rennsportteam Großmann					DNS	DNS											0
Pos	Team	OSC (Germany)		SPA (Belgium)		SAC (Germany)		NÜR (Germany)		RBR (Austria)		LAU (Germany)		SVK (Slovakia)		HOC (Germany)		Points

Colour	Result
Gold	Winner
Silver	Second place
Bronze	Third place
Green	Points finish
Blue	Non-points finish
Blue	Non-classified finish (NC)
Purple	Retired (Ret)
Red	Did not qualify (DNQ)
Red	Did not pre-qualify (DNPQ)
Black	Disqualified (DSQ)
White	Did not start (DNS)
White	Withdrew (WD)
White	Race cancelled (C)
Blank	Did not practice (DNP)
Blank	Did not arrive (DNA)
Blank	Excluded (EX)

**Bold** – Pole
Italics – Fastest lap

Position	1st	2nd	3rd	4th	5th	6th	7th	8th
Points	10	8	6	5	4	3	2	1
