= Red Bull RB1 =

Formula One racing car

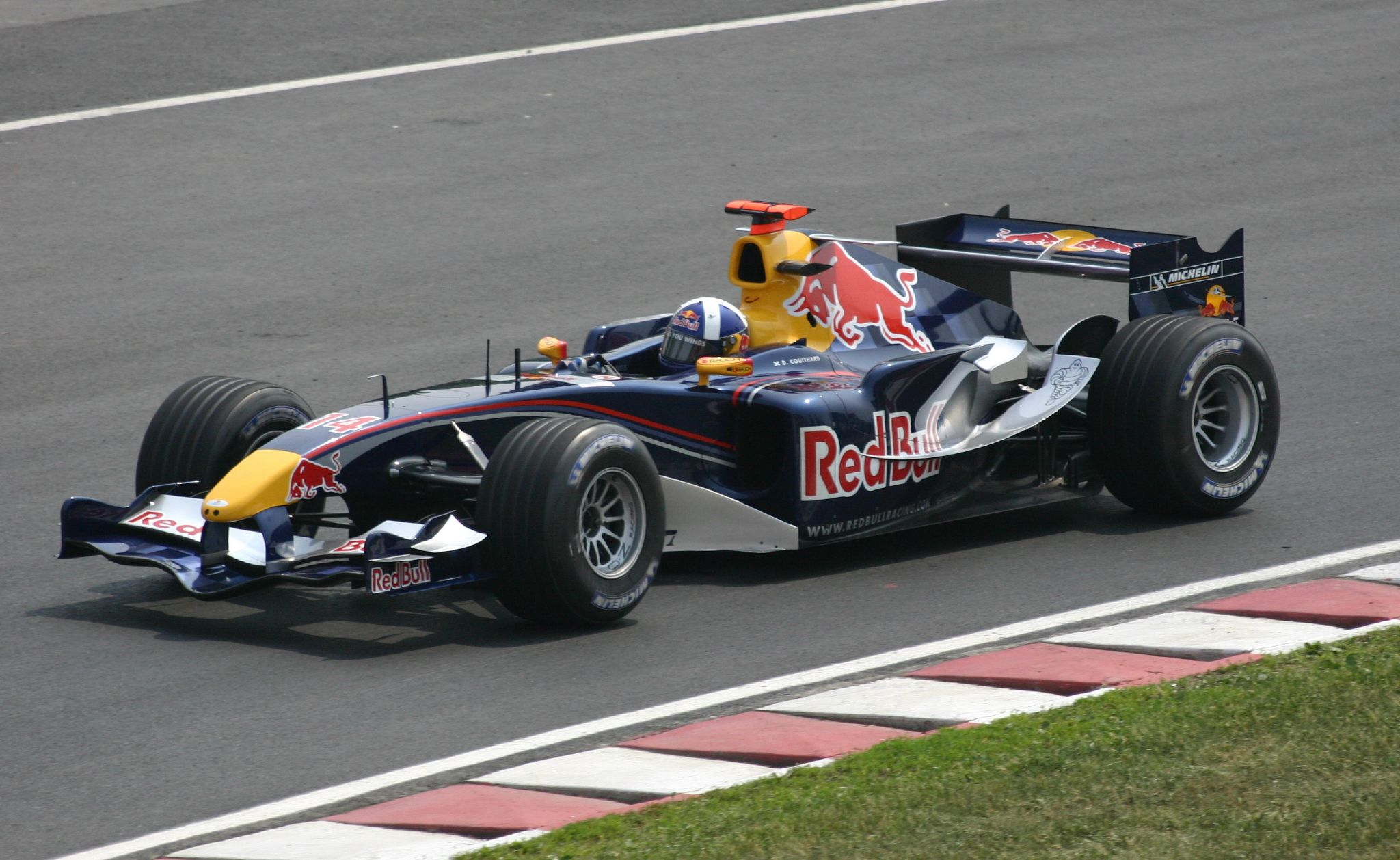
- David Coulthard driving the RB1 during the 2005 Canadian Grand Prix
- Category: Formula One
- Constructor: Jaguar/Red Bull
- Designers: David Pitchforth (Managing Director - Technical); Ian Pocock (Engineering Director); Rob Taylor (Chief Designer); Chris Hammond (Head of Vehicle Science); Ben Agathangelou (Head of Aerodynamics); Alex Hitzinger (Engine Chief Designer - Cosworth)
- Predecessor: Jaguar R5
- Successor: RB2

Technical specifications
- Chassis: Carbon fibre monocoque
- Engine: Cosworth TJ2005 3.0-litre 90° V10 naturally-aspirated mid engined
- Transmission: Red Bull 7-speed sequential
- Power: 915 hp (682.3 kW) @ 19,000 rpm
- Fuel: BP
- Lubricants: Castrol
- Tyres: Michelin; Oz Wheels

Competition history
- Notable entrants: Red Bull Racing
- Notable drivers: 14. (United Kingdom) David Coulthard; 15. (Austria) Christian Klien; 15. (Italy) Vitantonio Liuzzi
- Debut: 2005 Australian Grand Prix
- Last event: 2005 Chinese Grand Prix
Races	Wins	Poles	F/Laps
19	0	0	0
- Constructors' Championships: 0
- Drivers' Championships: 0

The Red Bull RB1 (originally known as Jaguar R6 prior to Red Bull's purchase of Jaguar Racing from Ford) is a Formula One racing car designed by Jaguar Racing for use in the 2005 season. However, with the Red Bull buyout of the Jaguar Racing team, it was used instead by Red Bull Racing. The Red Bull RB1 was officially launched at Circuito de Jerez, Spain on 7 February.

== Design ==
The chassis was designed by Mark Smith, Rob Taylor and Ben Agathangelou and the car's engine was a Cosworth TJ2005 3.0 litres (183 cu in) V10. The RB1 was the technically last-ever car built by Jaguar Racing but rebadged as Red Bull Racing after the energy drinks manufacturer bought the Jaguar Racing team in late 2004.

The RB1 is rather traditional and conservative, therefore, although only partially detaching itself from its Jaguar ancestor, it presents some characterizing elements. The nose is particularly raised from the ground and the front wing has a distinct spoon shape, with a sinuous shape and very similar to that of the Renault. The side bulkheads, similarly to the system of deflectors placed behind the front wheels, follow the layout of the old car and are inspired by those of Ferrari, especially in the detail of the flow diverters, taking on the characteristic shark tooth shape in the lower part. The mouth of the sides is very similar to the old Jaguar while the rear part appears very different, abandoning the curious vent system of the R5 in favor of a more traditional design featuring long fins, chimneys and exhaust fairings.

The chassis stands out for its accentuated height from the ground, which presupposes the search for maximum aerodynamic load: the bonnet has been slightly modified as, although the squared air intake inherited from the R5 is maintained, in the area of the roll-bar a small profile has been added.

== Racing history ==
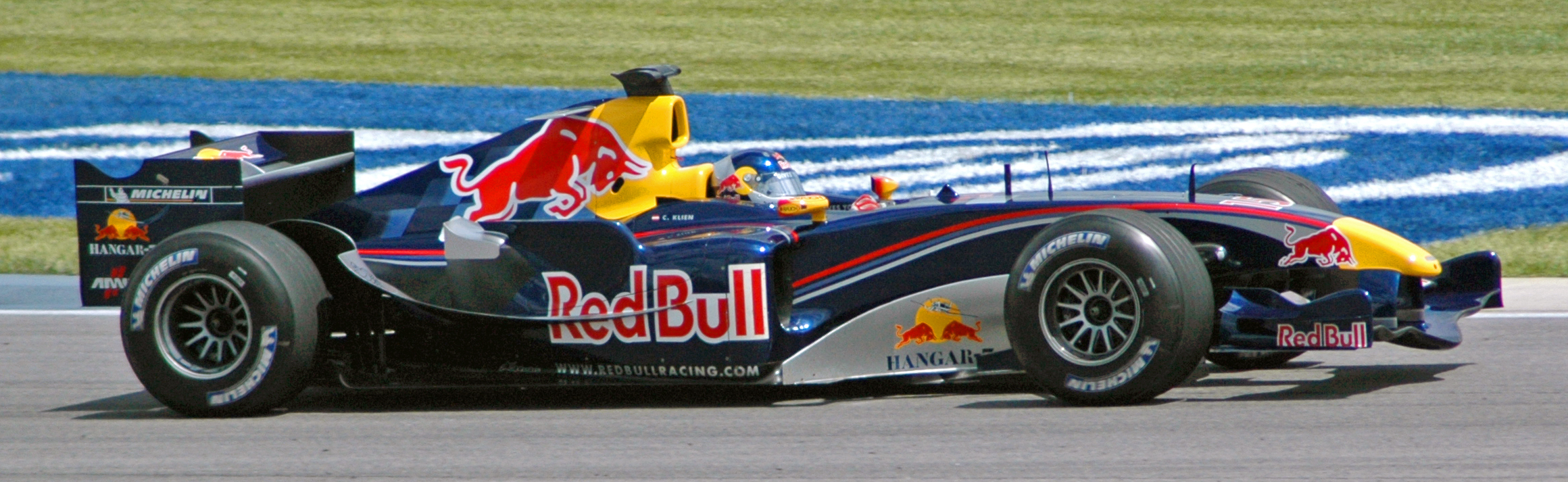
Christian Klien driving the RB1 during the 2005 United States Grand Prix

Briton David Coulthard drove for the entire season, with Austrian Christian Klien and Italian Vitantonio Liuzzi sharing the other car. Liuzzi raced in four of the rounds, with Klien racing in the other 15 rounds. The team had two test drivers: American Scott Speed and Swiss driver Neel Jani.

The RB1's best result was a fourth-place finish on its debut at the 2005 Australian Grand Prix in Melbourne, and at the 2005 European Grand Prix held at the Nürburgring. Both results were achieved by David Coulthard. Christian Klien's best finish was fifth at the season finale in Shanghai. Vitantonio Liuzzi's best finish in the RB1 was eighth in his debut race, the 2005 San Marino Grand Prix at Imola.

The chassis was reused for the Toro Rosso STR1 in 2006.

== Sponsorship and livery ==
The main colours used for the livery reflect those typical of the can of the Red Bull energy drink, i.e. blue, used as a base, and grey, used for the wing profiles as on the bargeboards, on the flow diverters in front of the rear wheels, on the profile upper part of the front wing and lower part of the rear wing. On the tip of the nose and in the area between the airscope and the bonnet there is the logo with the two red bulls charging on the yellow disc; they are positioned so that one is on the right side and one on the left side and that they both point towards the front of the car. Three thin bands also run along the sides (red, blue and gray from top to bottom) which start from the bulls positioned on the nose, continue along the sides of the survival cell and on the bellies and end in the rear part of the bonnet. Finally, there are motifs that recall the checkered flag on the nose, on the bonnet and on the outside of the rear wing bulkheads. Another sponsor is tire supplier Michelin.

For the Monaco Grand Prix the two RB1s compete with a special livery aimed at promoting the film Star Wars: Episode III - Revenge of the Sith and, for this race, the pit crew dressed up as Imperial Stormtroopers. Compared to the original one, it features decorative flames on the sides and an image of the character Darth Vader appears on the nose. Furthermore, the team logos located on the rear wing and on the bellies are replaced by those of the Star Wars franchise.

The Wings for Life logo was seen on the barge boards of the cars in Britain, Germany, Hungary and Belgium.

== Later uses ==
The RB1 was featured in Episode 5 of Season 14 of Top Gear, where it was used by both Jeremy Clarkson and Coulthard for one of their car art projects. They started by shooting paintballs from the car's exhaust and one of the paintballs hits Clarkson in his nether region, causing the two to use an aluminium canvas instead. They later soaked the car in ultraviolet paint, which caused Coulthard's visor to be blurry.

== Media ==
Mark Webber in the Red Bull-Cosworth RB1

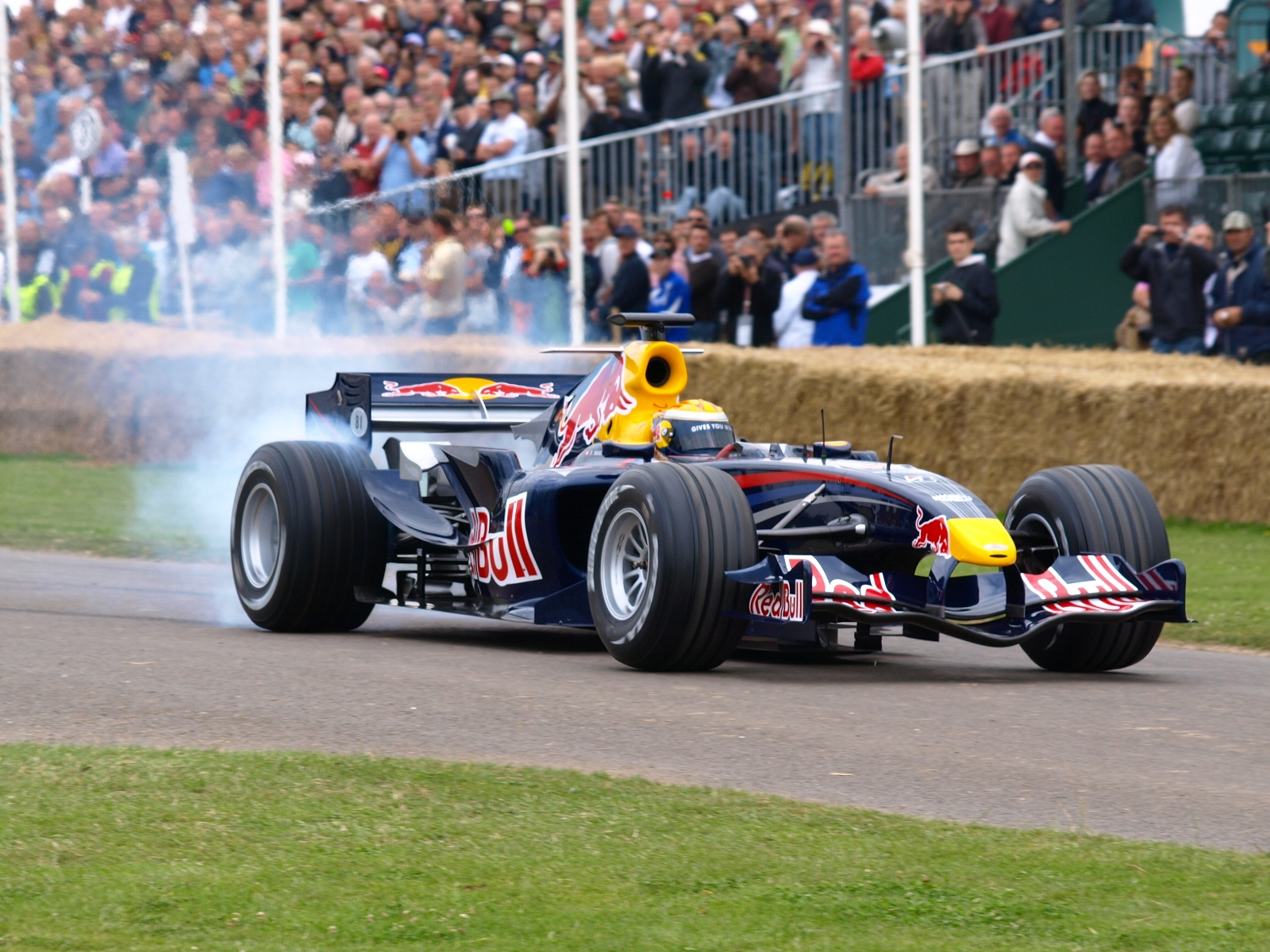
Sébastien Buemi demonstrating a RB1 at the 2008 Goodwood Festival of Speed.

== Complete Formula One results ==
(key) (results in bold indicate pole position; races in italics indicate fastest laps)

Year	Entrant	Engine	Tyres	Drivers	1	2	3	4	5	6	7	8	9	10	11	12	13	14	15	16	17	18	19	Points	WCC
2005	Red Bull Racing	Cosworth TJ2005 V10	**M**		AUS	MAL	BHR	SMR	ESP	MON	EUR	CAN	USA	FRA	GBR	GER	HUN	TUR	ITA	BEL	BRA	JPN	CHN	34	7th
2005	Red Bull Racing	Cosworth TJ2005 V10	**M**	(United Kingdom) David Coulthard	4	6	8	11	8	Ret	4	7	DNS	10	13	7	Ret	7	15	Ret	Ret	6	9	34	7th
2005	Red Bull Racing	Cosworth TJ2005 V10	**M**	(Austria) Christian Klien	7	8	DNS					8	DNS	Ret	15	9	Ret	8	13	9	9	9	5	34	7th
2005	Red Bull Racing	Cosworth TJ2005 V10	**M**	(Italy) Vitantonio Liuzzi				8	Ret	Ret	9													34	7th
