= Ian Pocock =

British mechanical engineer (born 1958)

- Born: 16 August 1958 (age 68)

Ian Randell Pocock (born 16 August 1958) is a British engineer.

== Career ==
Pocock studied mechanical engineering and completed his PhD studies at the Cranfield Institute of Technology. Developed the potential of an active suspension system for Jaguar Cars. At Cranfield, he was a consultant engineer for the Benetton team. After receiving his doctorate in 1990, he joined Reynard Motorsport to work as a development engineer on a planned Formula 1 project. In 1991, he worked as a development engineer at Ligier. The following year he joined Ferrari Design and Development, where he worked until 1995, when he was transferred to Maranello to be head of chassis research and development. In 1999, he moved to Honda Racing Developments where he became head of Vehicle Science. This project was canceled following the death of Harvey Postlethwaite. He moved to Pi Research, and in August 2001 he became director of engineering.

He became director of engineering for Jaguar in 2003, but retired in early 2005 after the team was acquired by Red Bull.
