= 2006 French Grand Prix =

Coordinates: 46°51′51″N 3°09′49″E

Race 11 of 18 in the 2006 Formula One World Championship
← Previous race	Next race →
- The Nevers Circuit modified in 2003

Race details
- Date: July 16, 2006
- Official name: Formula 1 Grand Prix de France 2006
- Location: Circuit de Nevers Magny-Cours, Magny-Cours, France
- Course: Permanent racing facility
- Course length: 4.411 km (2.741 miles)
- Distance: 70 laps, 308.586 km (191.746 miles)
- Weather: Sunny, 34°C

Pole position
Driver	(Germany) Michael Schumacher	Ferrari
- Time: 1:15.493

Fastest lap
Driver	(Germany) Michael Schumacher	Ferrari
- Time: 1:17.111 on lap 46

Podium
First	(Germany) Michael Schumacher	Ferrari
Second	(Spain) Fernando Alonso	Renault
Third	(Brazil) Felipe Massa	Ferrari

The 2006 French Grand Prix (officially known as the Formula 1 Grand Prix de France 2006) was a Formula One motor race held at the Circuit de Nevers Magny-Cours, near Magny-Cours, France on 16 July 2006.

Michael Schumacher of Scuderia Ferrari took pole position for the race and went on to win it ahead of championship leader Fernando Alonso with Renault. It was the German's 88th win in Formula One.

== Background ==
The event was held at the Circuit de Nevers Magny-Cours for the 16th time in the circuit's history across the weekend of 14–16 July. The Grand Prix was the eleventh round of the 2006 Formula One World Championship and the 56th running of the French Grand Prix as a round of the Formula One World Championship. This race also marked the centenary of the first French Grand Prix in 1906.

=== Championship standings before the race ===
Going into the weekend, Fernando Alonso was leading the championship, as he had been since the start, now with 88 points, compared to Michael Schumacher with 69. Renault teammate Giancarlo Fisichella had overtaken Kimi Räikkönen for third place with 43 points.

== Practice ==
Three practice sessions were held before the Sunday race: two on Friday, both lasting 90 minutes, and one on Saturday for 60 minutes. The first and second sessions were led by BMW Sauber's third driver Robert Kubica and the third session was headed by both the team's regular drivers Jacques Villeneuve and Nick Heidfeld.

=== Friday drivers ===
The bottom 6 teams in the 2005 Constructors' Championship and Super Aguri were entitled to run a third car in free practice on Friday. These drivers drove on Friday but did not compete in qualifying or the race.

Constructor	Nat	Driver
Williams-Cosworth	(Austria)	Alexander Wurz
Honda	(United Kingdom)	Anthony Davidson
Red Bull-Ferrari	(Netherlands)	Robert Doornbos
BMW Sauber	(Poland)	Robert Kubica
MF1-Toyota	(Germany)	Adrian Sutil
Toro Rosso-Cosworth	(Switzerland)	Neel Jani
Super Aguri-Honda	(Japan)	Sakon Yamamoto

== Qualifying ==
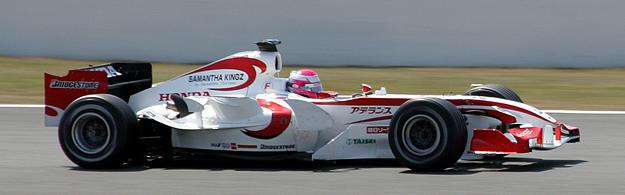
Home driver Franck Montagny driving for Super Aguri. It would be his last outing for the team in the 2006 season.

Saturday afternoon's qualifying session was divided into three parts. The first part ran for 15 minutes, and cars that finished the session 17th position or lower were eliminated from qualifying. The second part of the qualifying session lasted 15 minutes and eliminated cars that finished in positions 11 to 16. The final part of the qualifying session ran for 20 minutes which determined the positions from first to tenth, and decided pole position. Cars which failed to make the final session could refuel before the race, so ran lighter in those sessions.

Michael Schumacher scored his 68th and final pole position. He had held the record for the most pole positions since surpassing Ayrton Senna at the 2006 San Marino Grand Prix and would hold it until Lewis Hamilton surpassed it at the 2017 Italian Grand Prix.

Pos.	No.	Driver	Constructor	Q1	Q2	Q3	Grid
1	5	(Germany) Michael Schumacher	Ferrari	1:15.865	1:15.111	1:15.493	1
2	6	(Brazil) Felipe Massa	Ferrari	1:16.277	1:15.679	1:15.510	2
3	1	(Spain) Fernando Alonso	Renault	1:16.328	1:15.706	1:15.785	3
4	8	(Italy) Jarno Trulli	Toyota	1:15.550	1:15.776	1:16.036	4
5	7	(Germany) Ralf Schumacher	Toyota	1:15.949	1:15.625	1:16.091	5
6	3	(Finland) Kimi Räikkönen	McLaren-Mercedes	1:16.154	1:15.742	1:16.281	6
7	2	(Italy) Giancarlo Fisichella	Renault	1:16.825	1:15.901	1:16.345	7
8	4	(Spain) Pedro de la Rosa	McLaren-Mercedes	1:16.679	1:15.902	1:16.632	8
9	10	(Germany) Nico Rosberg	Williams-Cosworth	1:16.534	1:15.926	1:18.272	19^{1}
10	14	(United Kingdom) David Coulthard	Red Bull-Ferrari	1:16.350	1:15.974	1:18.663	9
11	9	(Australia) Mark Webber	Williams-Cosworth	1:16.531	1:16.129		10
12	16	(Germany) Nick Heidfeld	BMW Sauber	1:16.686	1:16.294		11
13	15	(Austria) Christian Klien	Red Bull-Ferrari	1:16.921	1:16.433		12
14	11	(Brazil) Rubens Barrichello	Honda	1:17.022	1:17.027		13
15	21	(United States) Scott Speed	Toro Rosso-Cosworth	1:17.117	1:17.063		14
16	19	(Netherlands) Christijan Albers	MF1-Toyota	1:16.962	1:17.105		15
17	20	(Italy) Vitantonio Liuzzi	Toro Rosso-Cosworth	1:17.164			22^{1}
18	17	(Canada) Jacques Villeneuve	BMW Sauber	1:17.304			16
19	12	(United Kingdom) Jenson Button	Honda	1:17.495			17
20	18	(Portugal) Tiago Monteiro	MF1-Toyota	1:17.589			18
21	23	(France) Franck Montagny	Super Aguri-Honda	1:18.637			20
22	22	(Japan) Takuma Sato	Super Aguri-Honda	1:18.845			21

Notes

- ^1 – Nico Rosberg and Vitantonio Liuzzi received a 10-place grid penalty for engine changes.

== Race ==
The race was held on 16 July 2006 and was run for 70 laps.

=== Race report ===
At the start, Fernando Alonso challenged Felipe Massa for second place, locking up at the first hairpin, but the Brazilian managed to hold on and protect his second place, as well as Michael Schumacher's lead. While several battles emerged in the midfield, Schumacher set a series of fastest laps to grow his lead out to 8 seconds over Alonso at the time that Massa pitted on lap 16.

After the first round of pit stops was completed, Schumacher led Massa by 6 seconds, with Alonso a further 5 seconds down the road. Jarno Trulli was fourth, but he was passed by Kimi Räikkönen on lap 26. Later in the race, Trulli would retire but his teammate Ralf Schumacher would end up finishing in that fourth position.

Alonso lost time behind backmarkers and was trailing Schumacher by 16 seconds when the German made his second stop. After Alonso had visited the pits for the second time, the gap had expanded to 26 seconds, with Massa still in between the rivals. When the Ferraris stopped for a third time, Alonso moved past Massa and conserved his tyres. He held on to second place and finished the race 10 seconds, but more importantly, just 2 points behind Schumacher.

Schumacher became the first driver in Formula One history to win the same Grand Prix on eight occasions (having previously won the French Grand Prix in 1994, 1995, 1997, 1998, 2001, 2002 and 2004). Schumacher also achieved his 22nd career hat trick (pole position, win & fastest lap at the same race), also a record.

=== Race classification ===
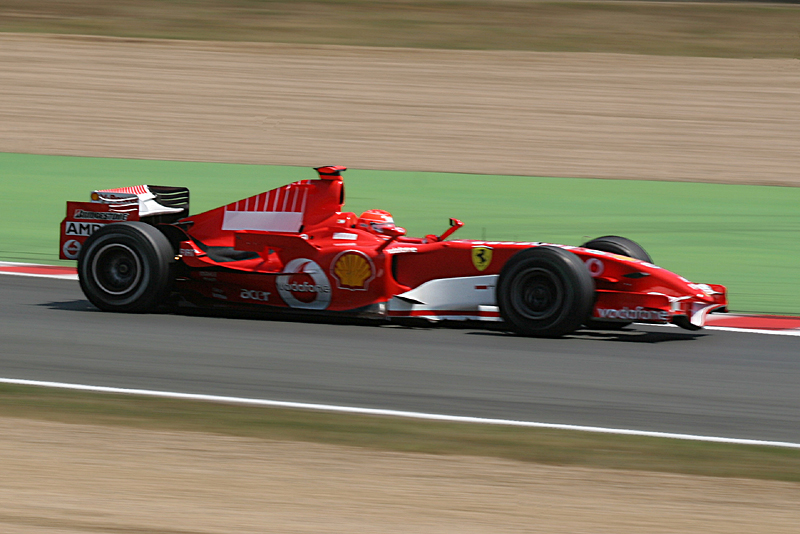
The race was won by Ferrari's Michael Schumacher.

Pos.	No.	Driver	Constructor	Tyre	Laps	Time/Retired	Grid	Points
1	5	(Germany) Michael Schumacher	Ferrari	B	70	1:32:07.803	1	10
2	1	(Spain) Fernando Alonso	Renault	MI	70	+10.131	3	8
3	6	(Brazil) Felipe Massa	Ferrari	B	70	+22.546	2	6
4	7	(Germany) Ralf Schumacher	Toyota	B	70	+27.212	5	5
5	3	(Finland) Kimi Räikkönen	McLaren-Mercedes	MI	70	+33.006	6	4
6	2	(Italy) Giancarlo Fisichella	Renault	MI	70	+45.265	7	3
7	4	(Spain) Pedro de la Rosa	McLaren-Mercedes	MI	70	+49.407	8	2
8	16	(Germany) Nick Heidfeld	BMW Sauber	MI	69	+1 lap	11	1
9	14	(United Kingdom) David Coulthard	Red Bull-Ferrari	MI	69	+1 lap	9	
10	21	(United States) Scott Speed	Toro Rosso-Cosworth	MI	69	+1 lap	14	
11	17	(Canada) Jacques Villeneuve	BMW Sauber	MI	69	+1 lap	16	
12	15	(Austria) Christian Klien	Red Bull-Ferrari	MI	69	+1 lap	12	
13	20	(Italy) Vitantonio Liuzzi	Toro Rosso-Cosworth	MI	69	+1 lap	22	
14	10	(Germany) Nico Rosberg	Williams-Cosworth	B	68	+2 laps	19	
15	19	(Netherlands) Christijan Albers	MF1-Toyota	B	68	+2 laps	15	
16	23	(France) Franck Montagny	Super Aguri-Honda	B	67	+3 laps	20	
Ret	12	(United Kingdom) Jenson Button	Honda	MI	61	Engine	17	
Ret	9	(Australia) Mark Webber	Williams-Cosworth	B	55	Wheel rim	10	
Ret	8	(Italy) Jarno Trulli	Toyota	B	39	Brakes	4	
Ret	11	(Brazil) Rubens Barrichello	Honda	MI	18	Engine	13	
Ret	18	(Portugal) Tiago Monteiro	MF1-Toyota	B	11	Accident	18	
Ret	22	(Japan) Takuma Sato	Super Aguri-Honda	B	0	Transmission	21	

== Championship standings after the race ==
Drivers' Championship standings

Pos.	Driver	Points
1	(Spain) Fernando Alonso	96
2	(Germany) Michael Schumacher	79
3	(Italy) Giancarlo Fisichella	46
4	(Finland) Kimi Räikkönen	43
5	(Brazil) Felipe Massa	42

Constructors' Championship standings

	Pos.	Constructor	Points
	1	(France) Renault	142
	2	(Italy) Ferrari	121
	3	(United Kingdom) McLaren-Mercedes	71
	4	(Japan) Honda	32
1	5	(Japan) Toyota	21

- Note: Only the top five positions are included for both sets of standings.

== See also ==
- 2006 Magny-Cours GP2 Series round

Previous race: 2006 United States Grand Prix	FIA Formula One World Championship; 2006 season	Next race: 2006 German Grand Prix
Previous race: 2005 French Grand Prix	French Grand Prix	Next race: 2007 French Grand Prix
