= Ben Agathangelou =

British automotive engineer

- Born: Panayiotis Agathangelou; 4 November 1971 (age 54)

Panayiotis "Ben" Agathangelou (Greek: Παναγιώτης Αγαθαγγέλου; born 4 November 1971 in Hackney, London) is a Cypriot-British automotive engineer, specialising in aerodynamics, who currently works for the Haas F1 Team.

== Career ==
Agathangelou studied aeronautics and astronautics at the University of Southampton before joining the McLaren F1 team in 1994, where he stayed for three years. After a year at Tyrrell, he moved to Honda and helped to design the Honda RA099 test car, which was ultimately never raced partly due to the sudden death of Harvey Postlethwaite, the project's technical director.

He was hired by Benetton in 1999, before moving to Jaguar two years later. He designed the team's 2003 car, the R3, and the first Red Bull cars after the team was sold to the drinks company in 2005. He left the team in 2007 after a personnel shake-up caused by the arrival of Adrian Newey.

He returned to Formula One in 2010 after being recruited by the new Hispania Racing F1 Team, and then moved to Scuderia Ferrari. He took up the position of chief aerodynamicist at the new Haas F1 Team in March 2015.
