= Jacques Villeneuve =

Canadian racing driver (born 1971)

Jacques Villeneuve OQ
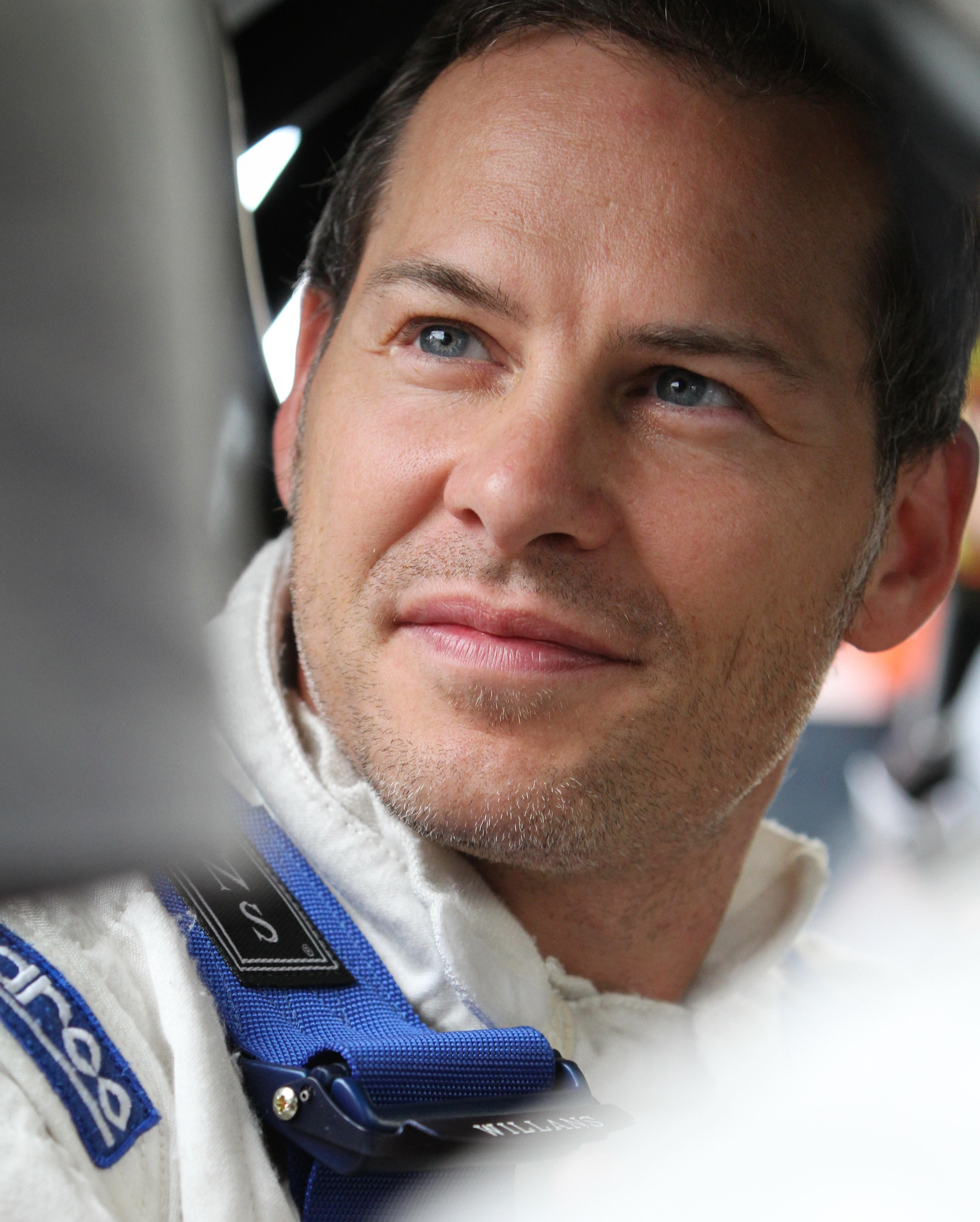
- Villeneuve in 2010
- Born: Jacques Joseph Charles Villeneuve; 9 April 1971 (age 55); Saint-Jean-sur-Richelieu, Quebec, Canada
- Spouses: Johanna Martinez (m. 2006; div. 2009) Camila Andrea López Lillo (m. 2012; div. 2020) Giulia Marra (m. 2023)
- Partners: Dannii Minogue (1999–2001)
- Children: 7
- Parent: Gilles Villeneuve (father)
- Relatives: Jacques-Joseph Villeneuve (uncle)

Formula One World Championship career
- Nationality: (Canada) Canadian
- Active years: 1996–2006
- Team(s): Williams, BAR, Renault, Sauber, BMW Sauber
- Entries: 165 (163 starts)
- Championships: 1 (1997)
- Wins: 11
- Podiums: 23
- Career points: 235
- Pole positions: 13
- Fastest laps: 9
- First entry: 1996 Australian Grand Prix
- First win: 1996 European Grand Prix
- Last win: 1997 Luxembourg Grand Prix
- Last entry: 2006 German Grand Prix

Champ Car career
- 33 races run over 2 years
- Best finish: 1st (1995)
- First race: 1994 FAI IndyCar Grand Prix (Surfers Paradise)
- Last race: 1995 Monterey Grand Prix (Laguna Seca)
- First win: 1994 Texaco/Havoline 200 (Road America)
- Last win: 1995 Cleveland Grand Prix (Cleveland)
| Wins | Podiums | Poles |
|---|---|---|
| 5 | 10 | 6 |

24 Hours of Le Mans career
- Years: 2007–2008
- Teams: Peugeot
- Best finish: 2nd (2008)
- Class wins: 0
- Categorisation: FIA Platinum (until 2026); FIA Gold (2027–)

Championship titles
- CART Championship Car (1995); FIA World Drivers' Championship (1997); Major victories Indianapolis 500 (1995)

Jacques Joseph Charles Villeneuve (French: [ʒɑk vilnœv]; born 9 April 1971) is a Canadian former racing driver who competed in IndyCar from 1994 to 1995, and Formula One from 1996 to 2006. Villeneuve won the Formula One World Drivers' Championship in 1997 with Williams, and won 11 Grands Prix across 11 seasons. In American open-wheel racing, Villeneuve won the IndyCar World Series and the Indianapolis 500 in 1995 with Team Green.

Born in Quebec and raised in Monaco, Villeneuve is the son of Formula One driver Gilles Villeneuve and the nephew of racing driver Jacques-Joseph. Aged 17, he began racing under an Andorran license in Italy, progressing to Italian Formula Three a year later. He then moved to the higher-tier Toyota Atlantic Championship, participating in one race during the 1992 season and finishing third overall in the 1993 championship. He began competing in Championship Auto Racing Teams with the Forsythe/Green Racing team in the 1994 season, finishing sixth in the Drivers' Championship with one victory and earning Rookie of the Year and Indianapolis 500 Rookie of the Year honours. In the following year with the renamed Team Green, Villeneuve won four races (including the Indianapolis 500) and the Drivers' Championship.

Villeneuve moved to Williams in Formula One for the 1996 season, claiming four Grand Prix victories, and becoming the first rookie runner-up in the World Drivers' Championship (WDC) after a season-long duel with teammate Damon Hill. His main title challenge for the following season came from Ferrari's Michael Schumacher, and Villeneuve beat the latter following a controversial collision at the season-ending European Grand Prix, becoming the first Canadian World Drivers' Champion, achieving seven Grand Prix victories. He finished fifth in the 1998 season achieving two podiums and helped Williams finish third in the World Constructors' Championship behind Ferrari and McLaren. After an unsuccessful 1999 with British American Racing (BAR), Villeneuve finished seventh in the WDC in both 2000 and 2001 with BAR, achieving two podiums in 2001, outscoring his teammates Ricardo Zonta and Olivier Panis. Villeneuve raced in Formula One from 2002 to 2006, driving for BAR, Renault, Sauber, and BMW Sauber, but he did not achieve any further success.

Villeneuve left Formula One mid-way through the 2006 season and began competing in various forms of motor racing such as sports car racing, NASCAR, and touring car racing. Though not as successful in these forms of racing, he won the 2008 1000 km of Spa driving for Peugeot. Villeneuve was appointed Officer of the National Order of Quebec in 1998 and was the winner of the Hawthorn Memorial Trophy the year before. He was voted the winner of both the Lou Marsh Trophy and the Lionel Conacher Award in each of 1995 and 1997. Villeneuve is an inductee of the Canadian Motor Sports Hall of Fame, Canada's Sports Hall of Fame, and the FIA Hall of Fame.

== Early life ==
On 9 April 1971, Villeneuve was born in Saint-Jean-sur-Richelieu, a small town outside of Montreal in the Canadian province of Quebec. He is the son of snowmobile and future Ferrari racer Gilles Villeneuve and his wife Joann Barthe. Villeneuve has a sister, Melanie, and a half sister Jessica. His uncle, Jacques Sr., whom he was named after also competed in motor racing. Villeneuve spent most of his formative years travelling with the racing fraternity with his parents.

Aged seven in 1978, Villeneuve and his family relocated from Berthierville, Quebec, to the small principality of Monaco on the French Riviera in France's south-east coast close to the border with Italy to be nearer to Ferrari's headquarters. On the advice of driver Patrick Tambay, Villeneuve was sent to the French-speaking Swiss private boarding Collège Alpin International Beau Soleil by his mother, which he attended from the ages of twelve (1983) to seventeen (1988). He excelled in skiing and experimented with BASE jumping, ice hockey, motocross and water skiing. Villeneuve left the school by mutual consent between his mother and the school owners.

== Early racing career ==
Villeneuve's mother was aware from when he was five that he wanted to race, and he went go-karting with his uncle several times in Canada. In May 1982, his father died in an accident with Jochen Mass during qualifying for the 1982 Belgian Grand Prix at Circuit Zolder. Jacques became less interested in motor racing after that, fearing the sport's dangers. In 1984, he asked his mother if he could do motor racing like his father. Villeneuve's mother agreed to let him race on the condition he improved his academic performance in one of his weakest subjects, mathematics. Though his mother preferred him to do a course in aerodynamic or mechanical engineering, she did not discourage her son from pursuing racing. In early September 1985, Villeneuve was invited by a SAGIS employee to race in 100 cc go-kart at Italy's Imola Circuit. He impressed the track owners so much that they let him test a 135 cc kart and then a Formula 4 car. In July 1986, his uncle enrolled him in the Jim Russell Racing Driver School in Mont Tremblant, (Note: The school had been interested in Villeneuve since his father attended it in the early 1970s. His mother agreed on the condition journalists were not allowed to enter the circuit.) where he passed a three-day course driving a Formula Ford 1600 car from Van Diemen. (Note: Blocks were fitted onto the car pedals by staff to enable Villeneuve to reach them and sit next to the steering wheel since he is small in stature.)

In mid-1987, Villeneuve left his family to attend the Spenard-David Racing School in Shannonville, Ontario to hone his abilities under Richard Spenard. Villeneuve did not have the money to pay for the course and his mother would not fund it because she thought Jacques finishing his education was more important. He worked in a mechanics' training programme allowing students to learn racing in return for garage painting. Aged seventeen, Villeneuve was invited to make his car racing debut in the Italian Touring Car Championship, driving a Salerno Course-entered Group N Alfa Romeo 33 car for three rounds of the 1988 season. The Canadian and Italian authorities would not grant him a licence since he was a year younger than their minimum age requirement, so he obtained an international racing licence in Andorra with Canadian Automobile Sport Clubs aid. (Note: His nationality was occasionally presented as either Andorran or Canadian during this period.) Villeneuve performed poorly in each of the three rounds.

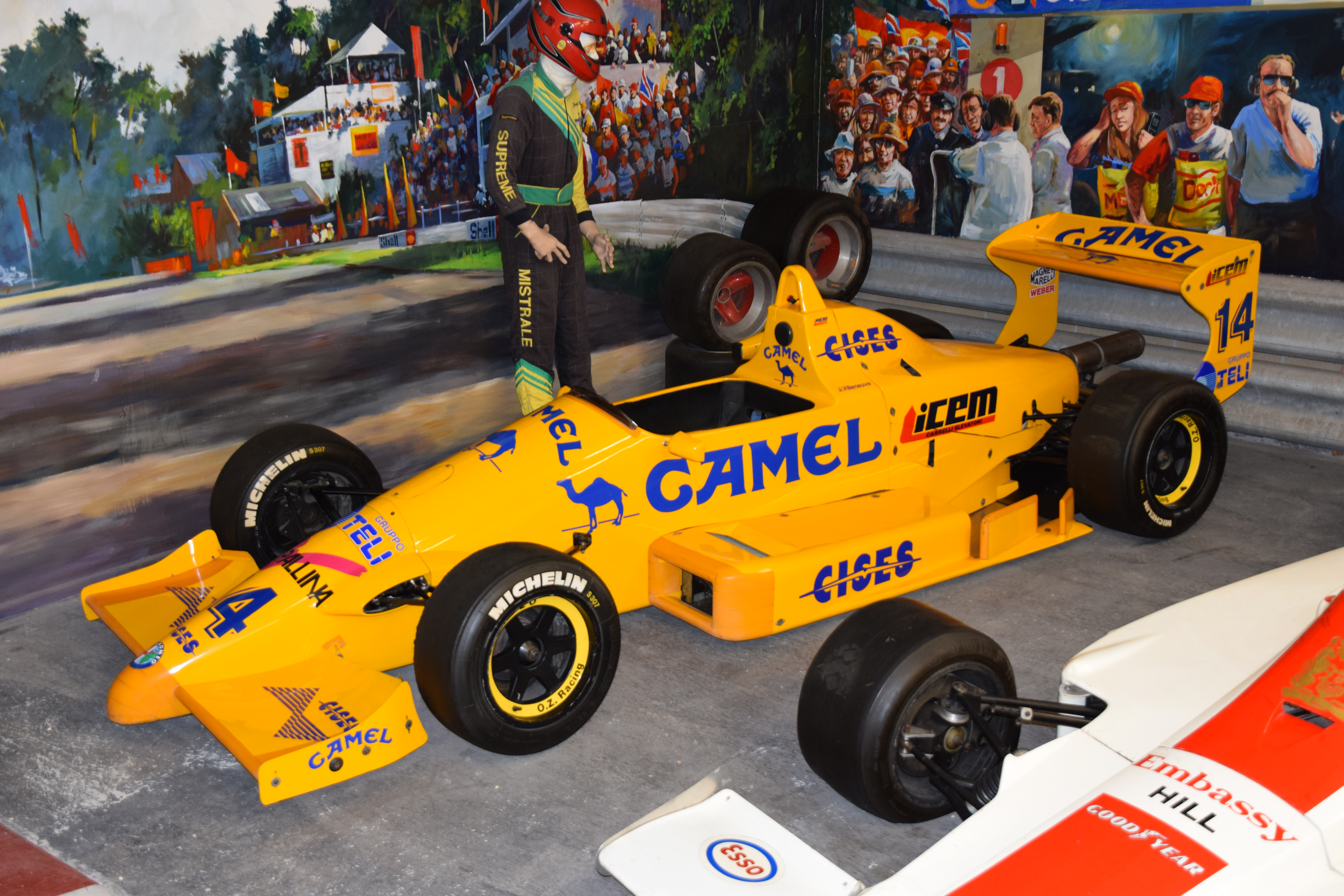
The car Villeneuve drove in the 1989 Italian Formula 3 Championship

Villeneuve went on to sign a three-year contract to drive a Reynard-Alfa Romeo car for Prema in the Italian Formula Three Championship, a deal that was aided by the squad obtaining sponsorship from the Camel cigarette company. (Note: Cigarette company Marlboro did not want to sponsor Villeneuve because their management did not want to exploit his name.) Initially struggling to drive a Formula 3 car, he enrolled at the Magione Driving School. Under Henry Morrogh's direction, he gradually developed his character and driving technique. Villeneuve did not qualify five times, failed to finish three of the eleven races, and scored no points. In the 1990 season, he qualified for each of the twelve rounds and scored ten points for 14th in the Drivers' Championship. (Note: A victory for Villeneuve at the final round of the 1990 season at the ACI Vallelunga Circuit was disallowed when he was assessed a one-minute penalty for a jump start.) Villeneuve was considered a title favourite for the 1991 championship. A late-season switch to the Ralt RT35 chassis failed to improve his performance, but he still finished sixth overall with twenty points and three podiums. In late 1991, Villeneuve finished eighth in both the Macau Grand Prix and the Formula 3 Fuji Cup.

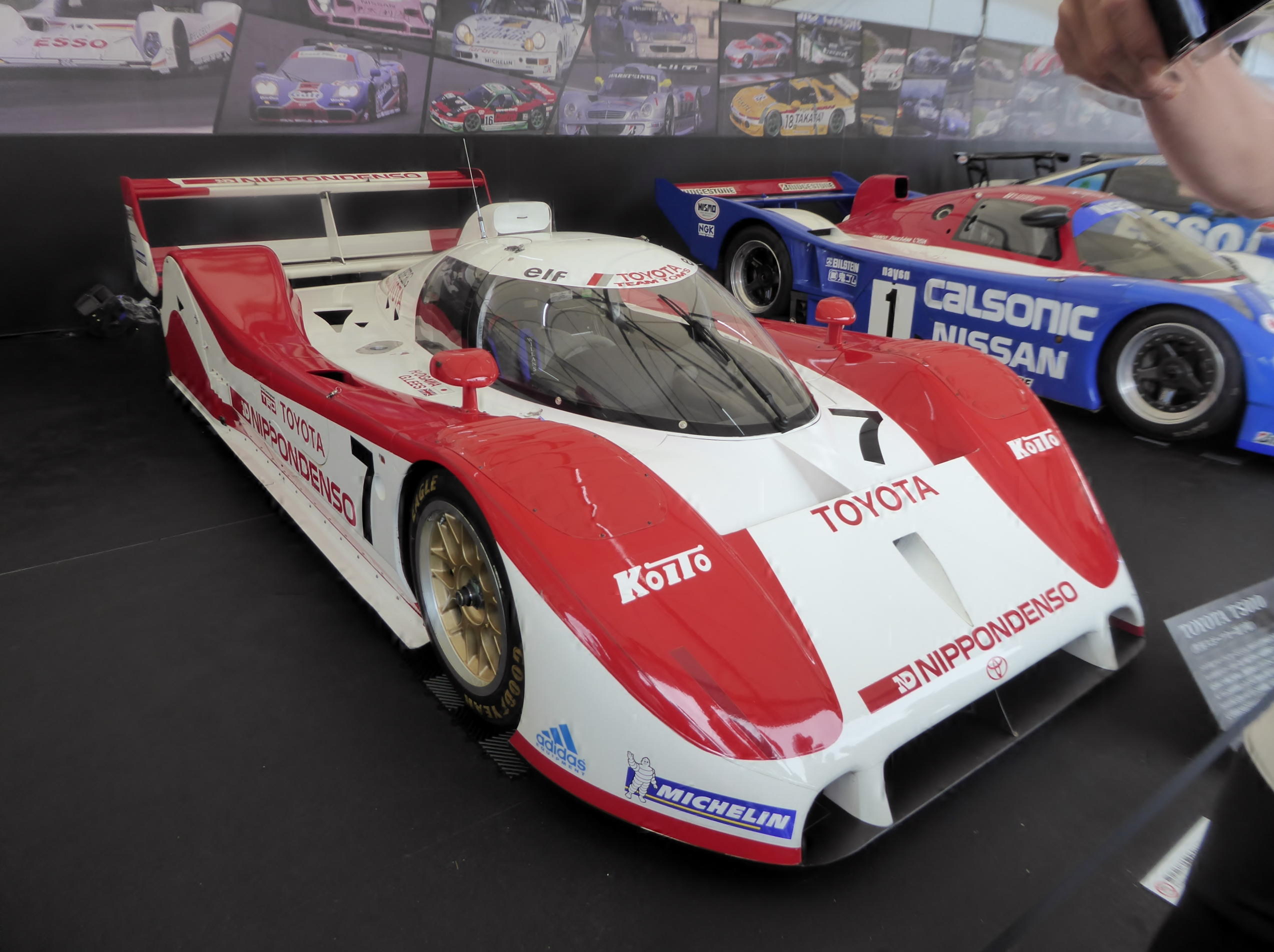
The Toyota TS010 car Villeneuve shared with Eddie Irvine and Tom Kristensen at Mine Circuit.

Dissatisfied with his management in 1991, Villeneuve asked former Beausoleil sports administrator and motor racing promoter Craig Pollock to take over his management three times. For the 1992 season, he wanted to compete in Formula 3000 in Europe with Prema, but did not have the funding to compete with the top teams. Villeneuve accepted an offer to relocate to Japan and drive a Toyota 032F car for the TOM'S squad in the Japanese Formula 3 Championship in 1992 following advice from Tambay. He felt the Japanese series was almost as good as the Italian one, and he did not want to remain in Europe. Villeneuve was the only driver to receive works support from TOM'S, and he got driver training. He won three races and finished no lower than sixth nine times, earning second in the Drivers' Championship and 45 points. People in the racing world observed that ten years after his father's death, Villeneuve was becoming a well-known racer. In August, Pollock negotiated a contract for Villeneuve to enter the Formula Atlantic street event at Trois-Rivières in the 1992 Atlantic Championship. He finished third in the No. 49 Swift DB4-Toyota car lent by the ComPred team. In addition, he also tested a Group C Toyota that year and was mentored by driver Roland Ratzenberger.

Four months later, Villeneuve accepted an invite to share a TOM'S-entered Toyota TS010 car with Eddie Irvine and Tom Kristensen at the final round of the 1992 All Japan Sports Prototype Car Endurance Championship at Mine Circuit, finishing fourth. He was fourth at the Macau Grand Prix for TOM'S. In Trois-Rivières, Villeneuve met crew chief Barry Green who wanted a driver for his new Forsythe-Green Racing squad. He accepted a three-year contract from Green with personal sponsorship from sports marketing arm Player's November 1992. He raced the lower-tier 1993 Atlantic Championship which featured more powerful cars with more grip and downforce to become better acquainted with American open-wheel racing before progressing to Championship Auto Racing Teams (CART) in 1994. Villeneuve built a close working relationship with aerodynamicist Tony Cicale. Driving the No. 10 Ralt RT40-Toyota car, Villeneuve won five races and finished in the top three four times for third overall and 185 points after a season-long duel with David Empringham and teammate Claude Bourbonnais. He was named the series' Rookie of the Year, and ended 1993 retiring from the Macau Grand Prix driving a March Racing Ralt 93C-Fiat car.

== CART (1994–1995) ==
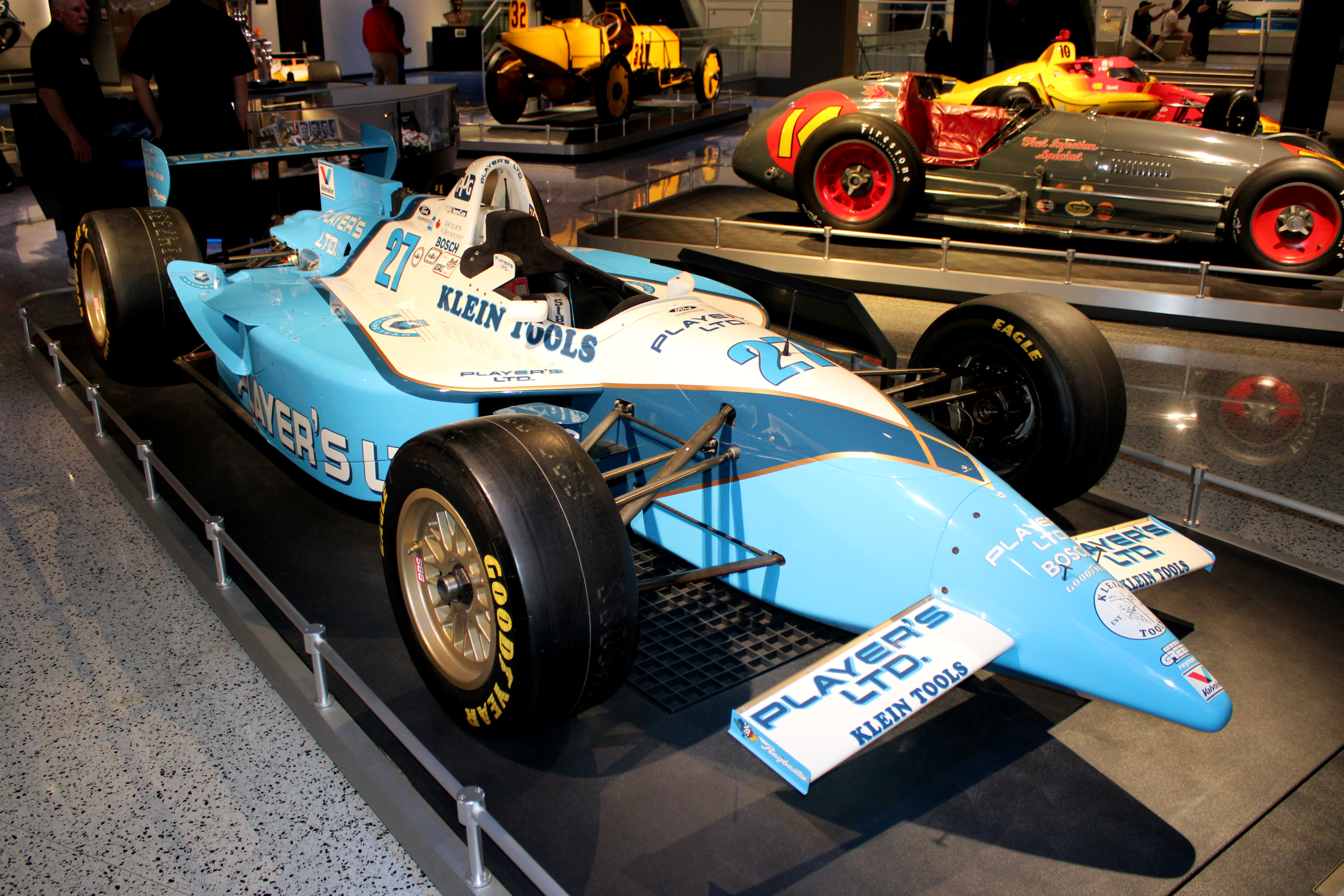
Villeneuve's 1995 Indianapolis 500 winning car

Villeneuve began participating in CART in the 1994 season for Forsythe-Green Racing, driving the No. 12 Reynard 94I-Ford XB vehicle after Green obtained sponsorship. (Note: Green wanted to select the number six but was unable to do so since Villeneuve placed sixth in the 1994 drivers' standings.) He debuted at the season-opening Australian FAI Indycar Grand Prix at Surfers Paradise Street Circuit, starting eighth and finishing 17th after colliding with Stefan Johansson. In the season's next round, the Slick 50 200 at Phoenix International Raceway, he was involved in a five-car accident which saw him sustain a side collision with Hiro Matsushita before being struck by Dominic Dobson. Qualifying fourth for his first Indianapolis 500, Villeneuve finished second, earning Indianapolis 500 Rookie of the Year honors as the highest-finishing rookie. Villeneuve finished ninth or higher in six of the next nine rounds, before beating Al Unser Jr. and Emerson Fittipaldi in the close finish to the Texaco/Havoline 200 at Road America road course in his first CART victory. He placed seventh and third in the final two rounds ending the year with Rookie of the Year honors and was sixth in the Drivers' Championship with 94 points.

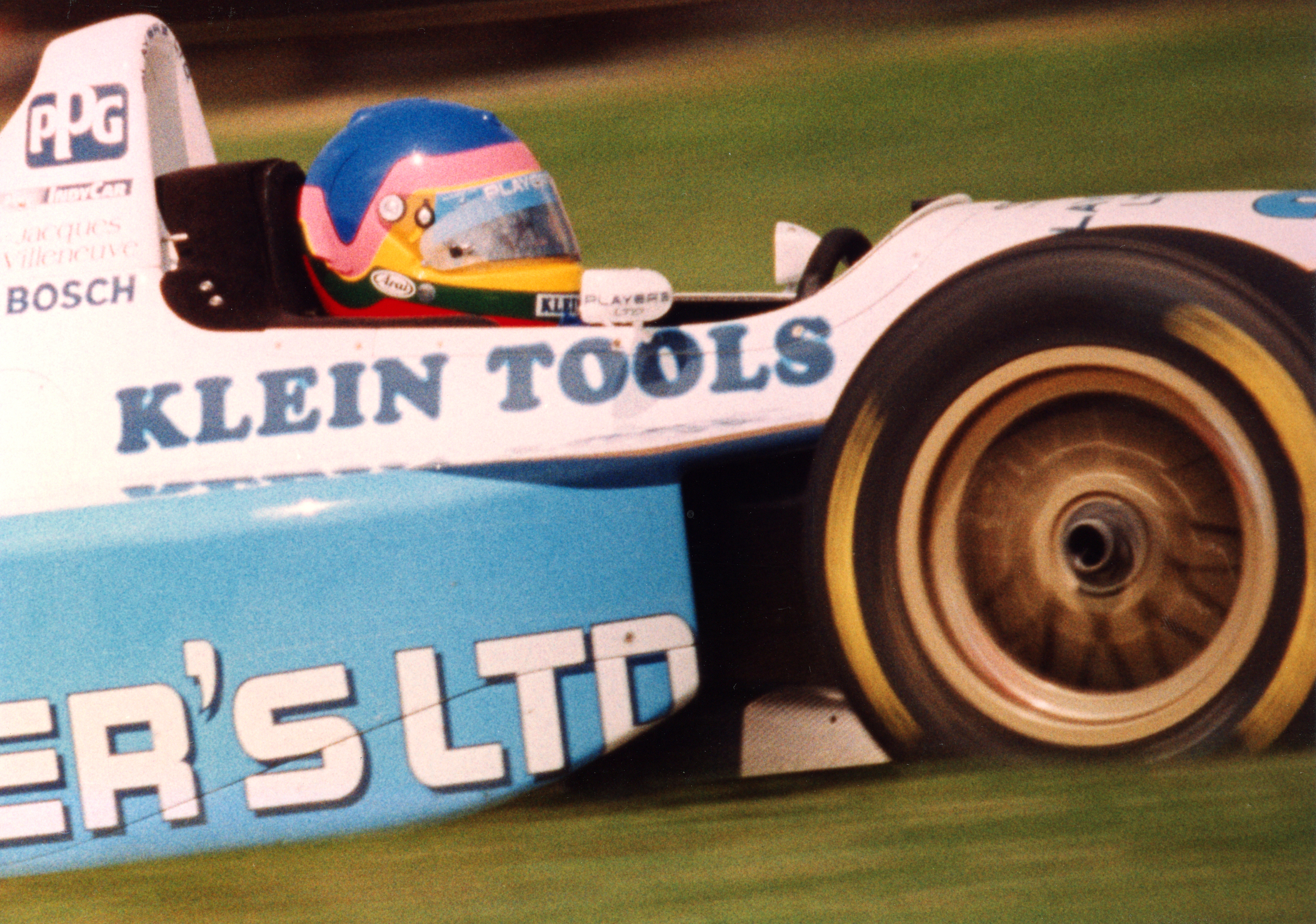
Villeneuve racing in the 1995 PPG IndyCar World Series at Mid-Ohio Sports Car Course

Before the 1995 season, Villeneuve rejected offers from fellow CART teams and some Formula One (F1) squads and remained at the renamed Team Green driving the renumbered No. 27 Reynard 95I-Ford XB. Before the season, Villeneuve and his team were concerned, as their car had been unreliable and under-performed in pre-season testing. He won the season-opening Marlboro Grand Prix of Miami after starting eighth, but he only finished two of the next four races. His season highlight was the Indianapolis 500. Though Villeneuve was penalised two laps for overtaking the pace car, he re-took the lead after fellow Canadian Scott Goodyear failed to serve a ten-second stop-and-go penalty for also passing the pace car. Winning just his second Indianapolis 500 start, Villeneuve took the Drivers' Championship lead. Villeneuve went on to win both the Texaco/Havoline 200 at Road America and the Grand Prix of Cleveland, also scoring points in all but one of the remaining rounds to clinch the title at the final race in Laguna Seca. He won the championship with 172 points, four victories and six pole positions. (Note: Villeneuve was the youngest driver as well as the first Canadian to win both the Indianapolis 500 and the series title.)

== Formula One career ==
=== Williams (1996–1998) ===
In early 1995, the Williams F1 team and engine supplier Renault became interested in Villeneuve replacing the outgoing David Coulthard. Bernie Ecclestone, F1's commercial rights holder, saw this as an opportunity to lure Villeneuve from CART even though Team Green wanted him to remain in America. Technical director Patrick Head and team principal Frank Williams gave Villeneuve a test in a FW17 car at Britain's Silverstone Circuit in August 1995. He lapped two seconds slower than driver Damon Hill. (Note: Williams issued press releases incorrectly saying Villeneuve was eight-tenths of a second slower than Hill.) Negotiations between Villeneuve's representatives in mid-1995 led to Villeneuve signing a contract for 1996 and 1997 with the option for the 1998 season. He was sent by Frank Williams to cover 6,000 mi (9,700 km) in testing during the six-month pre-season period testing on permanent European racing circuits, and he also prepared by learning the circuits on a simulation computer game.

==== 1996 ====
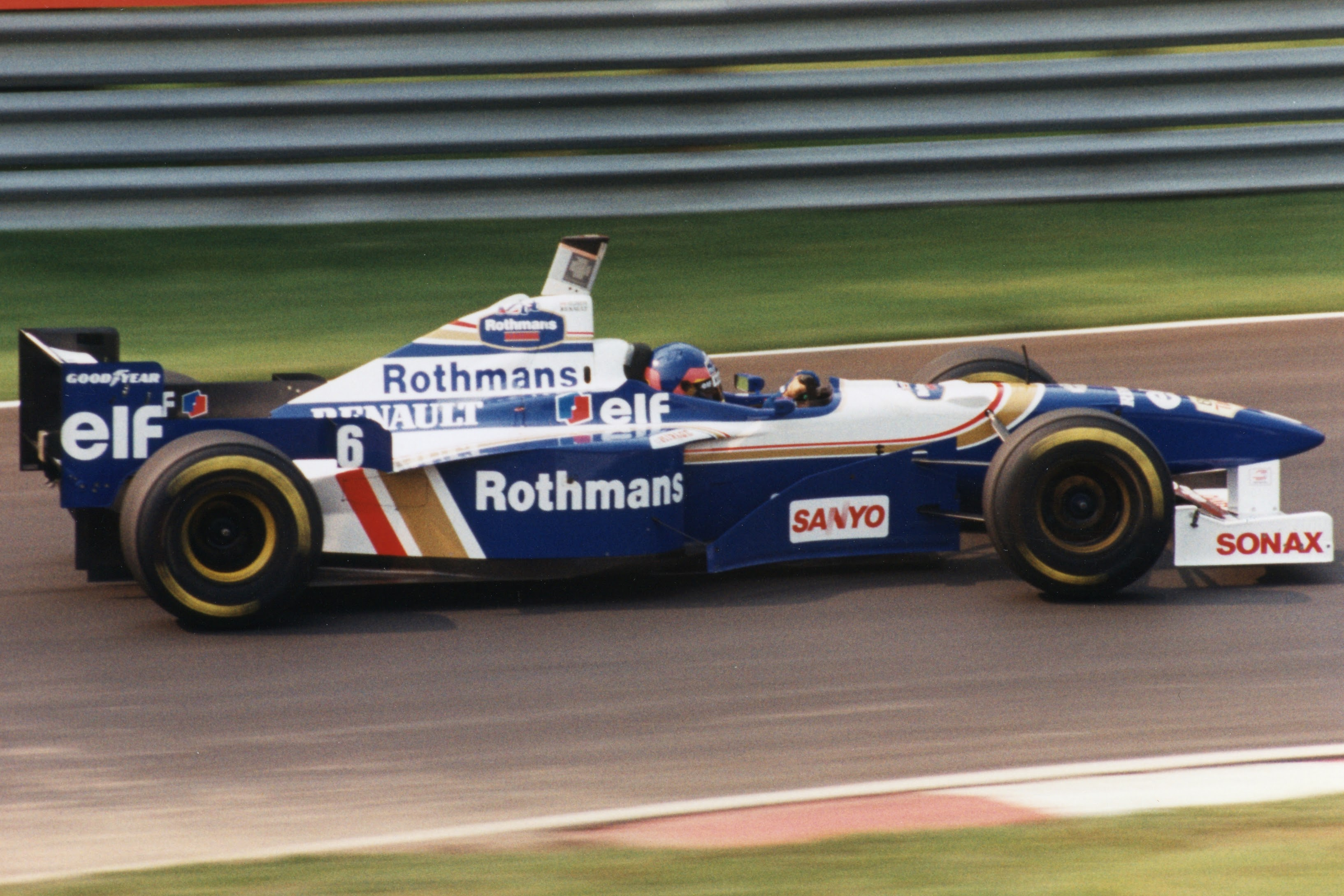
Villeneuve driving for Williams at the 1996 Canadian Grand Prix

Villeneuve drove the docile FW18 car equipped with a powerful, reliable Renault engine and a better gearbox. Villeneuve built up a rapport with his race engineer Jock Clear and learnt from his teammate Hill. Although not considered a title favourite by the media, he contended for the World Drivers' Championship with Hill but never led the standings. Villeneuve's debut at the season-opening Australian Grand Prix saw him become the third driver ever to claim pole position on his first start, and despite an oil leak, he finished second. He beat Ferrari's Michael Schumacher in the European Grand Prix three races later for his maiden F1 victory. Villeneuve scored points in eight of the next eleven events and won the British Grand Prix, the Hungarian Grand Prix and the Portuguese Grand Prix. Entering the season-ending Japanese Grand Prix, he had nine fewer points than Hill, requiring him to win the event and for Hill to score no points to claim the title; however, Villeneuve's right-rear tyre came off his car, forcing him to retire from the race. He finished runner-up to Hill in the drivers' standings with 78 points in his maiden season. Villeneuve was the first rookie to achieve four Grand Prix victories in his debut year and the first to finish runner-up overall. (Note: Lewis Hamilton equalled each of these records driving for McLaren in the 2007 season.)

==== 1997: World Champion ====
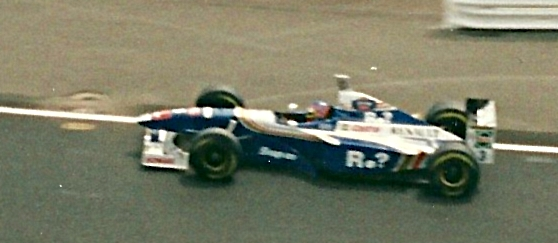
Jacques Villeneuve racing the Williams FW19 car at the 1997 British Grand Prix.

Before the 1997 season, Williams did not re-sign Hill who moved to the Arrows team, resulting in Villeneuve's promotion to lead driver. He was paired with Heinz-Harald Frentzen. He and Schumacher vied for that year's World Drivers' Championship and variously shared the title lead. Villeneuve trained extensively and drove an aerodynamically efficient and powerful FW19 car designed around him. He won seven Grands Prix and qualified on pole position eight times in the first fourteen races. At the season's penultimate race, the Japanese Grand Prix, he had a chance to win the championship but was banned for overtaking under yellow flag conditions twice during practice. He was allowed to race under appeal but was disqualified from fifth when the appeal was rejected. Before the season-ending European Grand Prix, Villeneuve had 77 points, one fewer than Schumacher, requiring him to finish in the top-six and ahead of Schumacher to win the championship. During qualifying, Villeneuve, Schumacher and Frentzen all set the exact same lap time, but Villeneuve started from pole position per F1 regulations because he was the first driver to set the time. Villeneuve and Schumacher were involved in a collision that saw Schumacher careen into a gravel trap, giving the title to Villeneuve. Villeneuve became the second driver (after Mario Andretti) to win the F1 World Championship, the CART title, and the Indianapolis 500. He was also Canada's first F1 World Champion.

==== 1998 ====
Villeneuve threatened to leave F1 and return to CART if F1 introduced grooved tyres and narrower cars for the 1998 season. Though these changes were adopted, he remained at Williams with Frentzen. Villeneuve's FW20 car had one-year old Mecachrome-branded engines after Renault's withdrawal from F1 after the 1997 season, which transpired to be noncompetitive. He scored points at nine Grands Prix with season-high third-place finishes at the German Grand Prix and the Hungarian Grand Prix. During practice for the Belgian Grand Prix, he lost control of his car in Eau Rouge corner and crashed backwards into the barrier at approximately 170 mph (270 km/h). Villeneuve was unhurt. With 21 points, he finished fifth in the Drivers' Championship.

=== British American Racing (1999–2003) ===
Villeneuve left Williams following the 1998 season. McLaren technical director Adrian Newey, who liked Villeneuve's performance and who Villeneuve respected, offered him employment for the 1999 season, but Villeneuve rejected it. He instead signed a contract to drive with the new British American Racing (BAR) team founded by Pollock and British American Tobacco following their late 1997 purchase of the financially struggling Tyrrell team. Villeneuve joined the team because he sought to emulate Schumacher's style of basing a team around him and employing highly skilled people to get from the bottom of the running order to the top.

==== 1999–2000 ====
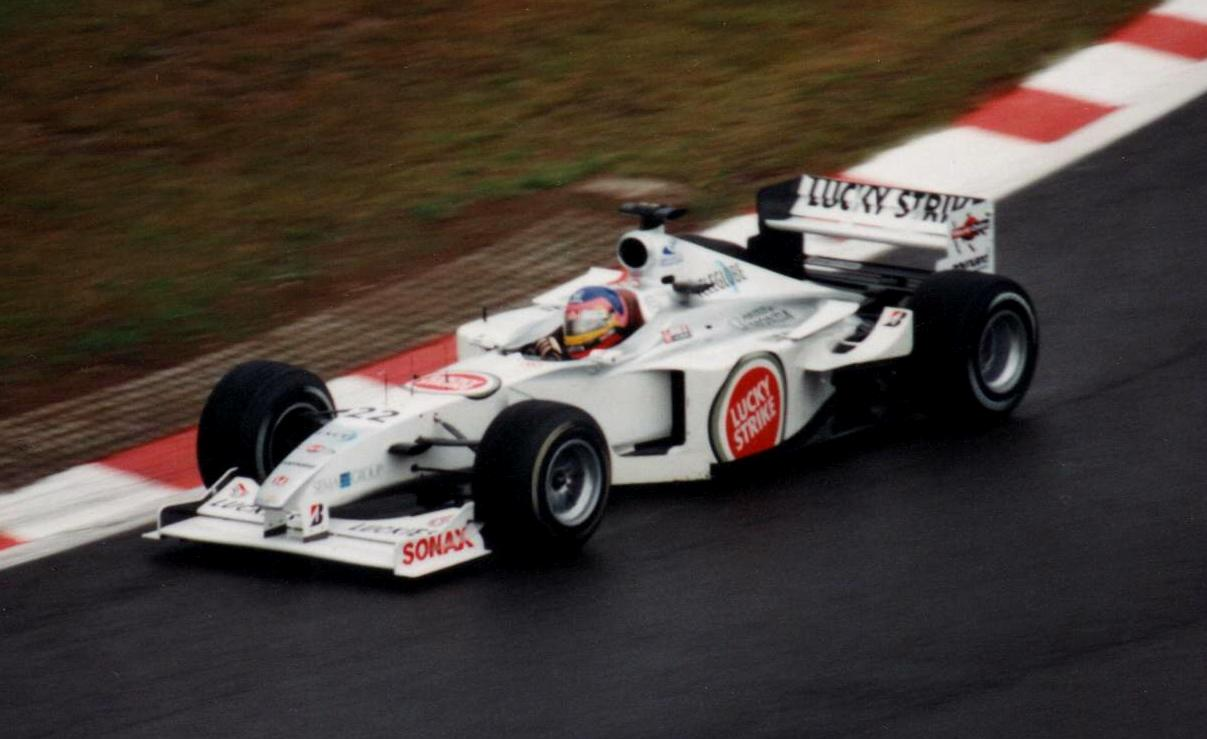
Villeneuve competing for British American Racing at the 2000 Belgian Grand Prix.

Villeneuve was joined at BAR by former McLaren test driver Ricardo Zonta for most of the season and then by Mika Salo for three Grands Prix. His BAR 01 car was efficient and fast but chronically unreliable. He failed to finish each of the first eleven races due to either mechanical trouble or crashing. Villeneuve was only able to finish four Grands Prix with a best finish of eighth at the Italian Grand Prix. Villeneuve qualified a season-high fifth at the San Marino Grand Prix and was briefly third in the Spanish Grand Prix two events later before retiring. During qualifying for the Belgian Grand Prix, he suffered a high-speed crash through Eau Rouge corner, which destroyed his car but left him uninjured. He tallied no points towards the Drivers' Championship.

For the 2000 season, Villeneuve's BAR 002 car had a more reliable and powerful works Honda engine, and Zonta was again his teammate. He finished fourth at the season-opening Australian Grand Prix and scored two more points by placing fifth at the San Marino Grand Prix two races later. He also finished fourth at the French Grand Prix, the Austrian Grand Prix and the United States Grand Prix. Villeneuve scored points in the final two races by finishing sixth at the Japanese Grand Prix and fifth at the Malaysian Grand Prix. Overall, his performances had improved from 1999 due to a better built and more reliable car. Villeneuve finished the season seventh in the Drivers' Championship with seventeen points.

==== 2001–2003 ====
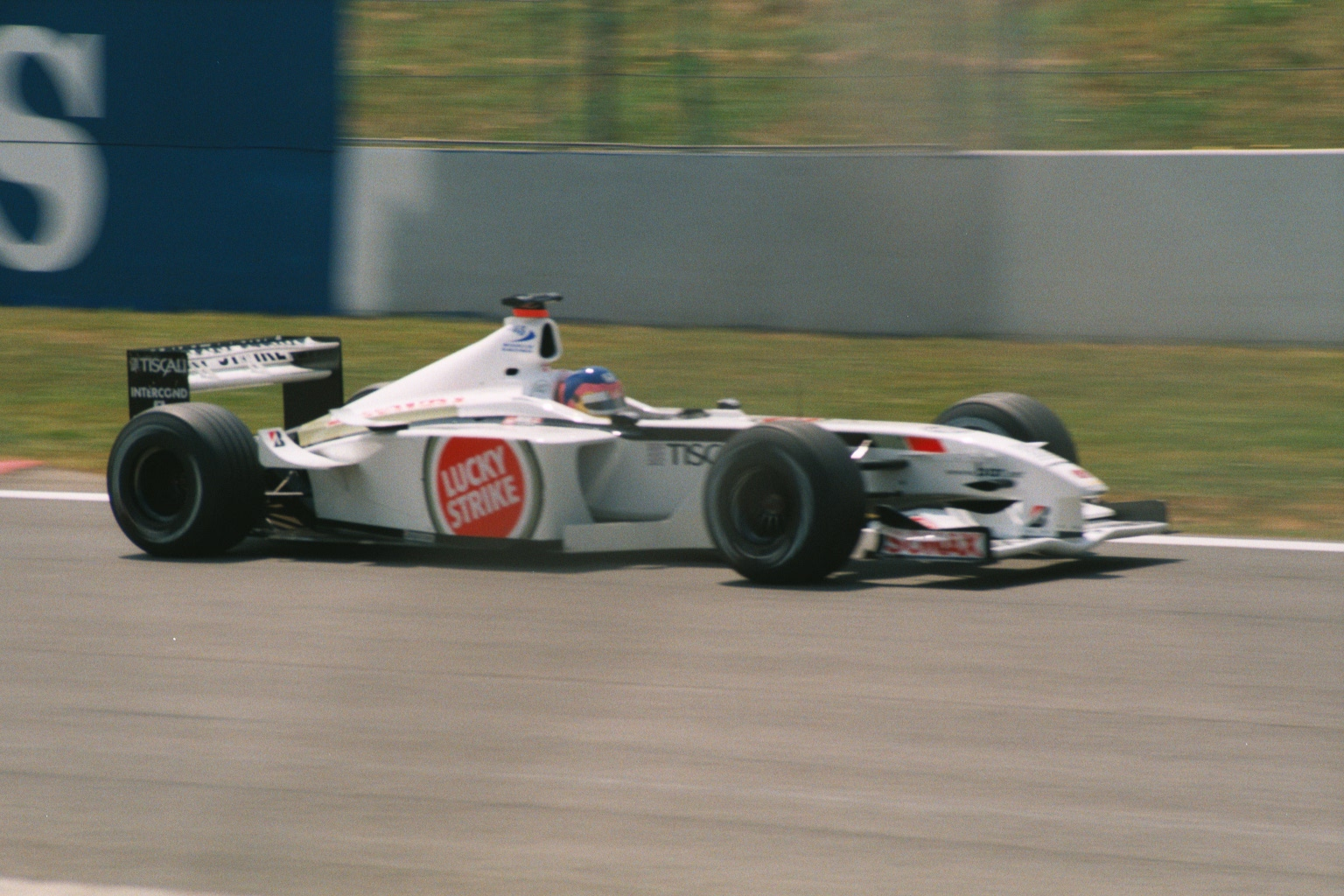
Villeneuve driving his BAR 003 at the 2001 Spanish Grand Prix

There were rumours of Villeneuve leaving the BAR team after 2000. He talked to Benetton, Ferrari and McLaren about racing with them in the 2001 championship. Villeneuve later admitted McLaren was not an option since his management team got accused of conducting early season publicity and he disliked McLaren's corporate methodology. Villeneuve also considered taking a sabbatical, but he ultimately signed a three-year contract extension with BAR in July 2000. He obtained a get-out clause enabling him to leave BAR should they under-perform.

Villeneuve was joined by Olivier Panis, and the 003 car he drove was approximately 30 kg (66 lb) lighter than the 002 chassis. Villeneuve was cordial with his teammate since they could talk to each other in French, and set himself the goal of winning a race and finishing third in the Drivers' Championship. His car was fairly reliable but lacked rear grip and straight-line speed due to an underpowered Honda engine. At the season-opening Australian Grand Prix, Villeneuve struck the rear of Ralf Schumacher's car, launching him into the air. One of Villeneuve's car's wheels struck marshal Graham Beveridge, killing him. Villeneuve achieved BAR's first two podium results, finishing third at both the Spanish Grand Prix and the German Grand Prix. He finished the season seventh in the Drivers' Championship with 12 points. Although he scored five fewer points than the year before, Villeneuve qualified higher than Panis eleven times in 2001.

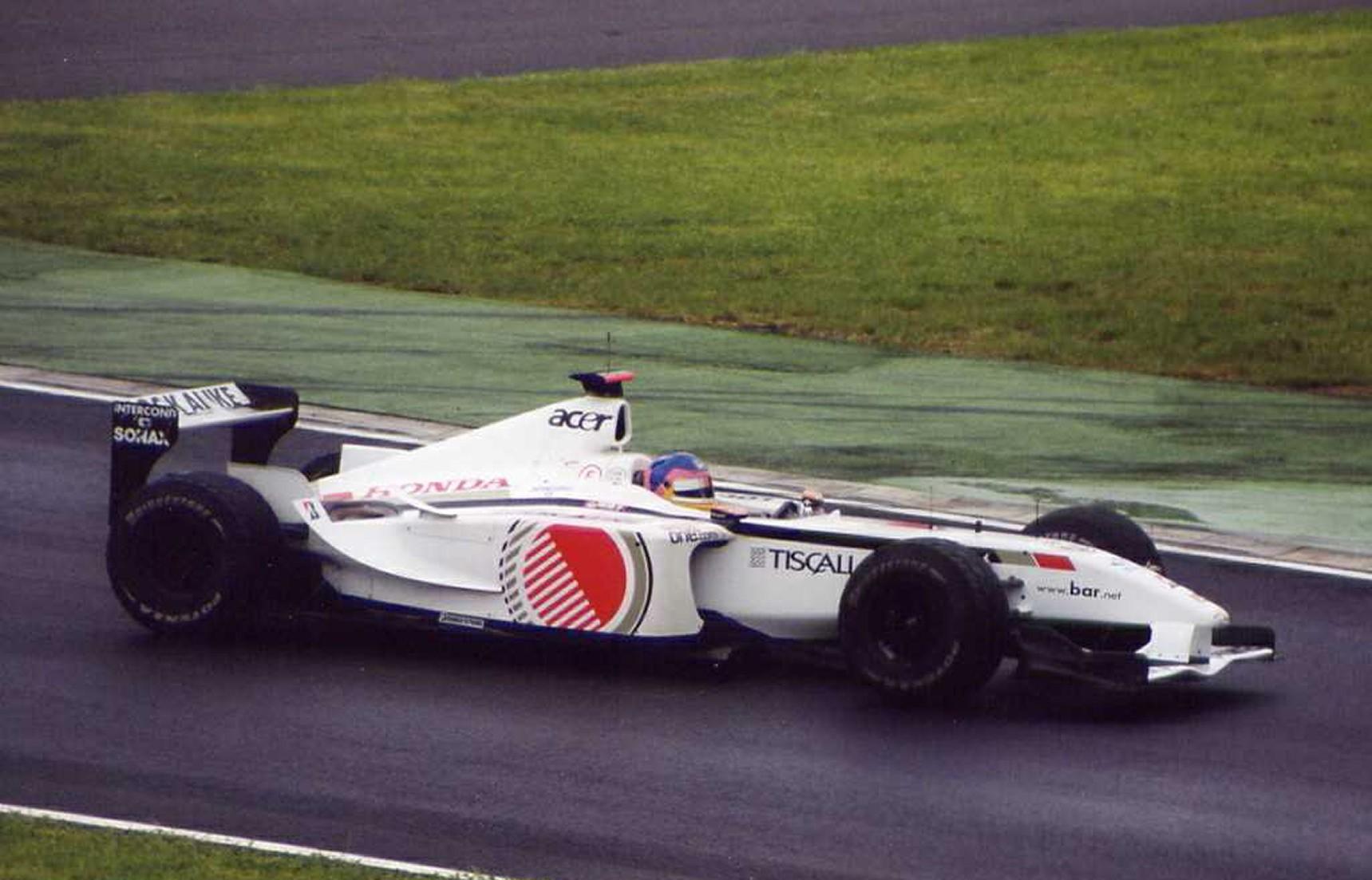
Villeneuve testing the BAR 004 car in 2002

Before the 2002 season, Villeneuve remained at BAR. He talked to team principal Flavio Briatore, who offered him a seat at Renault in lieu of Jenson Button but Villeneuve rejected it. Villeneuve ultimately opted to remain at BAR due to pressure from Honda, and he again partnered with Panis. He became uncomfortable when new BAR team principal David Richards publicly mentioned that money spent on Villeneuve's high salary could be better used for research and development. The BAR 004 chassis proved to be more unreliable than the year before and slower due to an under-powered Honda engine. He scored four points for 12th in the Drivers' Championship with a fourth place at the British Grand Prix being his season's best result. Villeneuve regretted remaining at BAR due to the lack of results, and he was offered a contract to join Team Player's in CART for the 2003 championship before returning to BAR for the 2004 and 2005 F1 seasons. The deal was pushed by Richards but not agreed upon because Villeneuve's and Pollock's financial settlements were too great for team owner Gerald Forsythe to be willing to take on.

Villeneuve decided to remain at BAR for the 2003 season, and was partnered with Button. Villeneuve's BAR 005 car had a more powerful but bulky Honda engine. He initially had a poor relationship with Button, not speaking to him and saying that Button "should be in a boy band". Their relationship did not improve after the season-opening Australian Grand Prix when Villeneuve was due to make a pit stop but drove an additional lap when Button was due to make his, leaving Button stationary behind Villeneuve. Although he blamed it on "radio problems", Button and Richards hinted their disbelief in his execution. Villeneuve was outperformed by his teammate and retired eight times due to mechanical faults. He finished sixth at both the Brazilian Grand Prix and the Italian Grand Prix. Before the season-ending Japanese Grand Prix, Villeneuve was informed by Richards he was no longer needed. He was replaced by test driver Takuma Sato. He was 16th in the Drivers' Championship with 6 points.

=== Renault and Sauber (2004–2006) ===
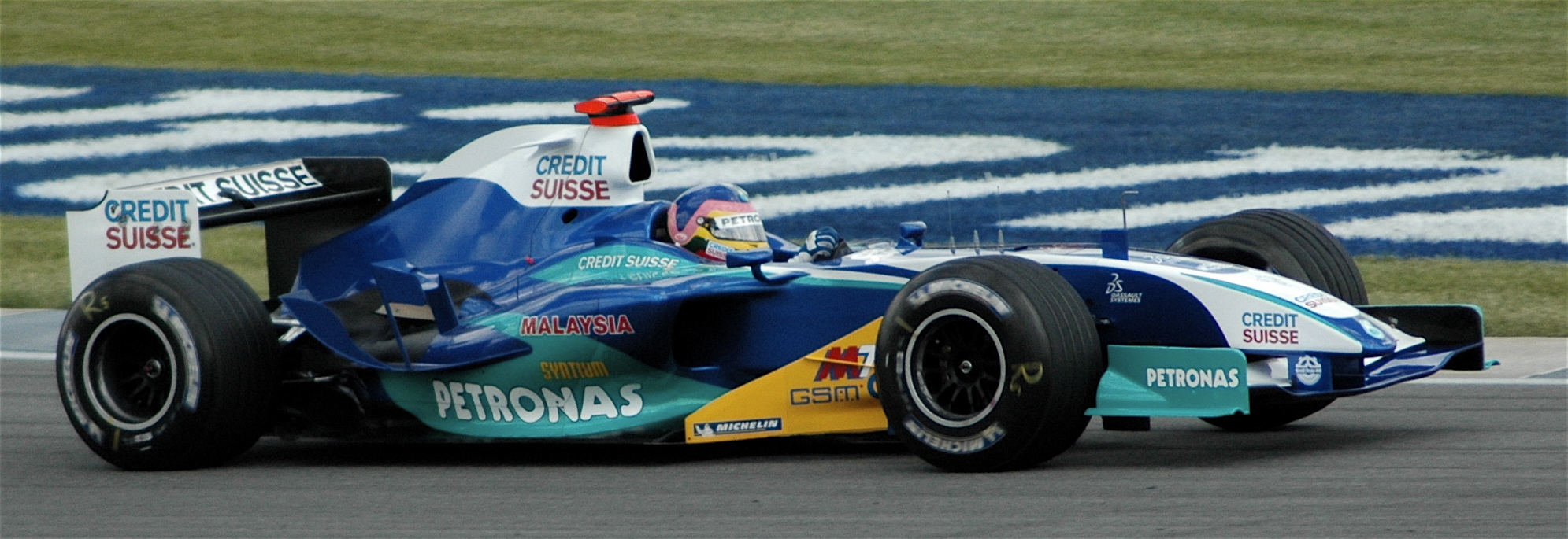
Villeneuve qualifying for Sauber at the 2005 United States Grand Prix.

Villeneuve took a sabbatical after BAR released him. He thought of taking up NASCAR as a new challenge, but no teams approached him. After speaking to senior officials from BAR and Williams, Villeneuve believed that they would want to re-sign him to their respective teams, but neither move occurred. When he realised no competitive team would employ him, he and Pollock met Sauber team owner Peter Sauber in Hinwil in mid-2004. Impressed with Sauber's professionalism, he signed a two-year contract the next month to drive for Sauber from the 2005 season and help them attract new sponsors and partners.

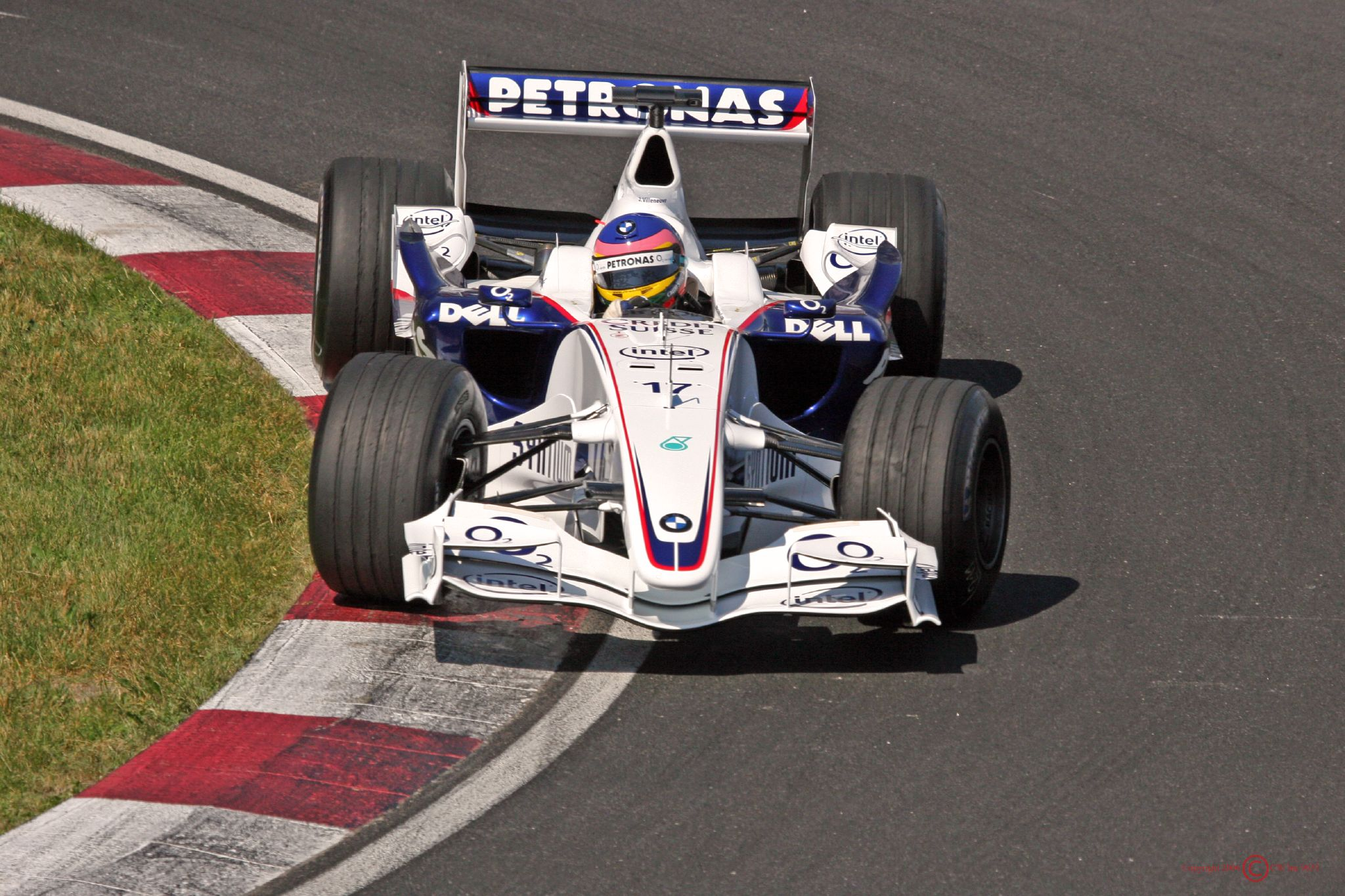
Villeneuve racing at the 2006 Canadian Grand Prix for the BMW Sauber

Before his tenure at Sauber began, Villeneuve was employed by Briatore to help Renault claim second from BAR in the World Constructors' Championship by scoring the maximum number of points in the 2004 season's final three races following the dismissal of Jarno Trulli for performing poorly. Sauber was comfortable in letting Villeneuve drive for Renault because both teams used Michelin tyres. Driving the R24 car, he finished all three events but under-performed and was lapped each time. Villeneuve scored no points and was unclassified in the Drivers' Championship.

At Sauber, Villeneuve used a C24 chassis and was teammates with Felipe Massa. A lack of both pre-season testing and money for car development caused Villeneuve to have a difficult handling car. He did not have a good relationship with the team because he was not allowed to give feedback on car setup due to Willy Rampf's influence. Villeneuve finished a season-high fourth at the San Marino Grand Prix and scored more points in eighth at the French Grand Prix and sixth at the Belgian Grand Prix. (Note: Poor performances in the season's first three races meant Peter Sauber did not guarantee that Villeneuve would continue at Sauber past the San Marino Grand Prix until his fourth-place result allowed him to retain his seat for the remainder of the season.) He was 14th in the Drivers' Championship with 9 points.

For the 2006 championship, Villeneuve stayed at the renamed BMW Sauber after BMW purchased the team. Nick Heidfeld was his teammate. The atmosphere within the team made Villeneuve content, and he was happy with BMW's involvement. He found the less electronically dependent and less refined aerodynamically F1.06 car more driveable. Team principal Mario Theissen criticised Villeneuve for not achieving decent results, thus failing to please BMW's board of directors. Despite retiring three times, he accumulated seven points from the first eleven races, ranking him fifteenth in the Drivers' Championship. At the German Grand Prix, Villeneuve sustained muscle pains in an accident exiting a corner. Shortly afterward, Theissen terminated his contract and replaced him with Robert Kubica. He did not want to be part of a shootout between himself and Kubica, and saw his release as a precursor to his future, saying "Screw this, It's time to get on with the rest of my life." Villeneuve twice failed to return to F1, first with Stefan Grand Prix in the 2010 season, then with his team in partnership with Durango for the following year.

== Post Formula One career ==
=== 2007–2010 ===
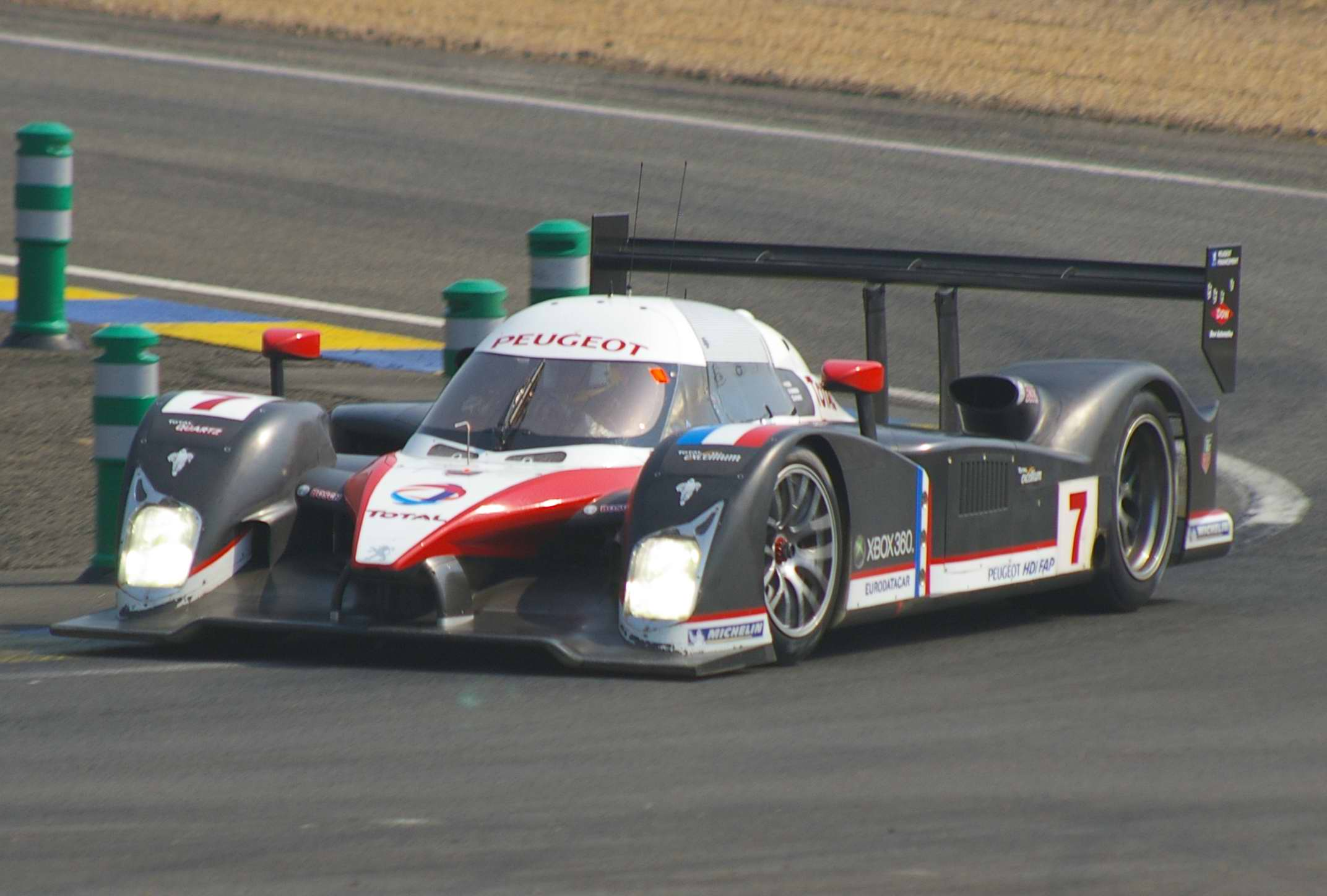
Villeneuve driving the No. 7 Peugeot 908 HDi FAP at the 2007 24 Hours of Le Mans

Villeneuve explored NASCAR after exiting F1, talking to Roush Racing owner Jack Roush who agreed to help Villeneuve obtain Truck Series experience before progressing to the Busch Series in 2007 on the condition of a sponsorship agreement. Before that, he made his 24 Hours of Le Mans debut with Peugeot in the 2007 edition informing team manager Serge Saulnier that he wanted to complete the Triple Crown of Motorsport. (Note: The Triple Crown of Motorsport consists of the F1 World Championship, the Indianapolis 500 and the 24 Hours of Le Mans.) Sharing the Le Mans Prototype 1 (LMP1)-class No. 7 Peugeot 908 HDi FAP car with Marc Gené and Nicolas Minassian, Villeneuve retired after 338 laps with engine injection trouble. He entered into a partnership with Bill Davis Racing (BDR) to enter the 2007 NASCAR Craftsman Truck Series' last seven events in its No. 27 Toyota Tundra in anticipation of racing full-time in 2008. Villeneuve finished outside the top ten in all seven events for 42nd overall with 615 points. That same year, he drove two races in the Nextel Cup Series (the UAW-Ford 500 at Talladega Superspeedway and the Checker Auto Parts 500 at Phoenix) in BDR's No. 27 Toyota, (Note: Villeneuve had planned to make his Cup Series debut at Phoenix but moved it forward five weeks following approval from NASCAR as a result of testing the Car of Tomorrow at Talladega and his performance in the Truck Series round at Las Vegas Motor Speedway. He therefore abandoned plans to race the ARCA and Truck Series events at Talladega.) finishing 21st and 41st respectively.

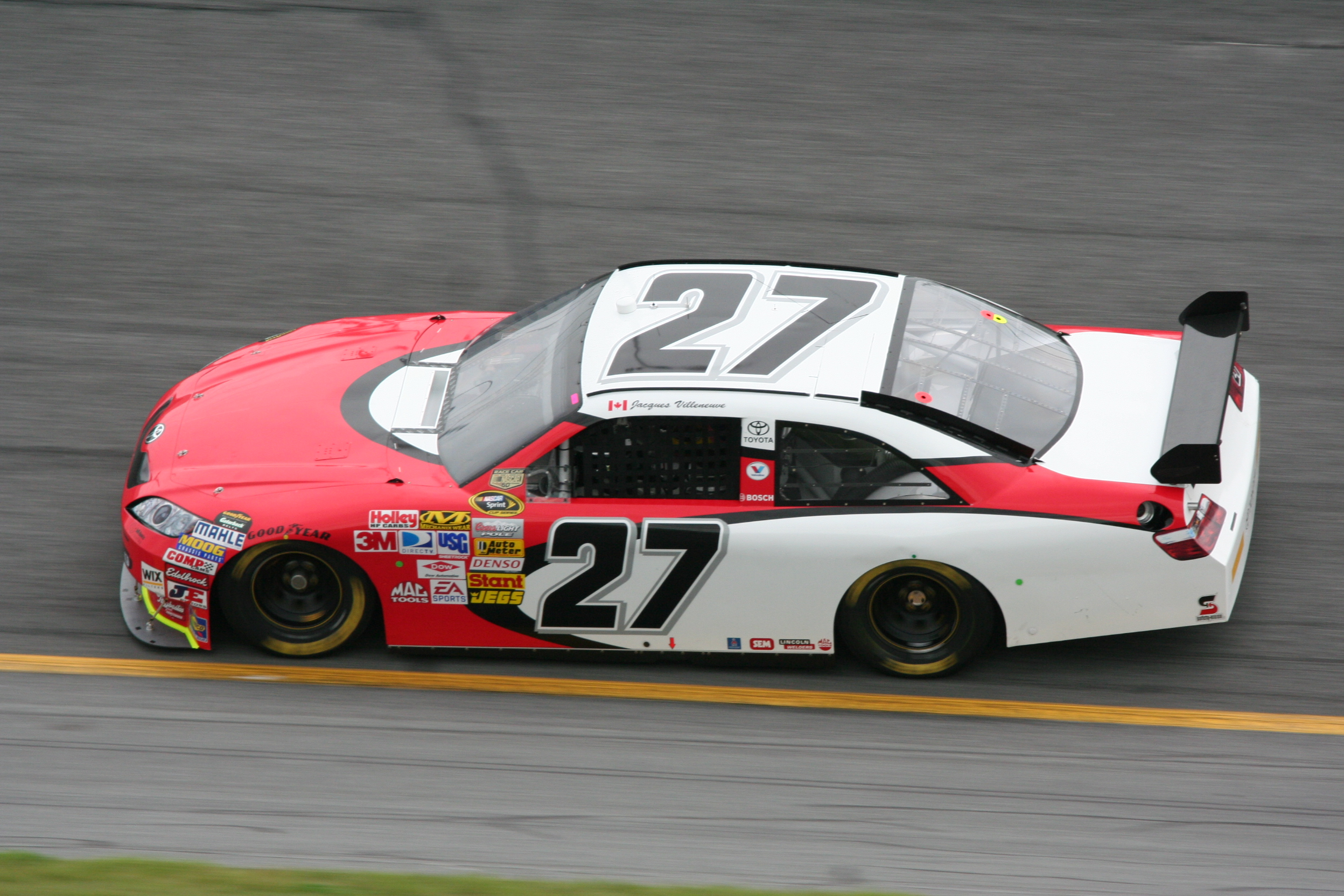
Villeneuve attempting to qualify for the 2008 Daytona 500

Villeneuve and Pollock agreed to end their working relationship in early 2008, and Barry Green began managing him. That February, BDR released Villeneuve, who failed to qualify for the Daytona 500 of the renamed Sprint Cup Series after causing a multi-car accident in the Gatorade Duels. Two months later, he raced the final two rounds of the inaugural season of the Middle East and Southeast Asian-based stock car Speedcar Series at the Bahrain International Circuit and the Dubai Autodrome. Villeneuve then won the 2008 1000 km of Spa (part of the Le Mans Series) for Peugeot with Gené and Minassian in his first race victory in eleven years. Although he finished second in the 24 Hours of Le Mans, sharing Peugeot's No. 7 LMP1 entry with Gené and Minassian, he was released a month later because Peugeot wanted a French driver. In August, Villeneuve signed a contract to make his Nationwide Series debut driving Braun Racing's No. 32 Toyota Camry in the NAPA Auto Parts 200 at Montreal's Circuit Gilles Villeneuve, finishing sixteenth. He also came 16th at the Autódromo Oscar y Juan Gálvez round of Top Race V6 Argentina aboard Oro Racing Team's No. 27 Volkswagen Passat TRV6.

Villeneuve returned to the Speedcar Series in the 2008–09 season driving for Durango. Competing in five races, he finished in the top ten three times, scoring seven points for eleventh in the Drivers' Championship. In mid-2009, Villeneuve partook in the Tide 250 at Autodrome Saint-Eustache and the GP3R 100 at Circuit Trois-Rivières of the NASCAR Canadian Tire Series for the Jacombs Racing Team in its No. 7 Ford Fusion, finishing fourth at Trois-Rivieres. For the first and only time, Villeneuve entered the Spa 24 Hours in 2009. He shared Gravity Racing International's G2 category No. 118 Mosler MT900R GT3 with Vincent Radermecker, Loris de Sordi and Ho-Pin Tung. The trio failed to finish. He drove the No. 27 Mercedes TRV6 at the Interlagos Circuit and Autódromo Oscar y Juan Gálvez rounds of Top Race V6 Argentina, achieving a best finish of thirteenth in Buenos Aires. He made one appearance in the 2009 Nationwide Series, finishing fourth at the NAPA Auto Parts 200 in Braun Racing's No. 32 car.

In 2010, Villeneuve ran the Nationwide Series road courses at Road America, Watkins Glen and Montreal in Braun Racing's No. 32 vehicle. He finished eighth at Watkins Glen before claiming third at Montreal, where he started second. In mid-season, Villeneuve entered the Brickyard 400 at Indianapolis Motor Speedway finishing 29th in Braun Racing's No. 32 car. Villeneuve joined Rod Nash Racing as Paul Dumbrell's international co-driver in its No. 55 Ford FG Falcon for the Gold Coast 600 double header in October 2010 and sought advice from driver Marcos Ambrose on touring car racing. (Note: Paul Morris considered Villeneuve for a full-time drive at Supercheap Auto Racing in the 2009 V8 Supercar Championship Series but a lack of sponsorship prevented his racing in the series.) He finished 22nd in the first race and fifth in the second. Ford motorsport manager Chris Styring considered Villeneuve for the Bathurst 1000, the L&H 500 and the Gold Coast 600 in the 2011 International V8 Supercars Championship, but Villeneuve's financial demands were too great for Ford.

=== 2011–present ===
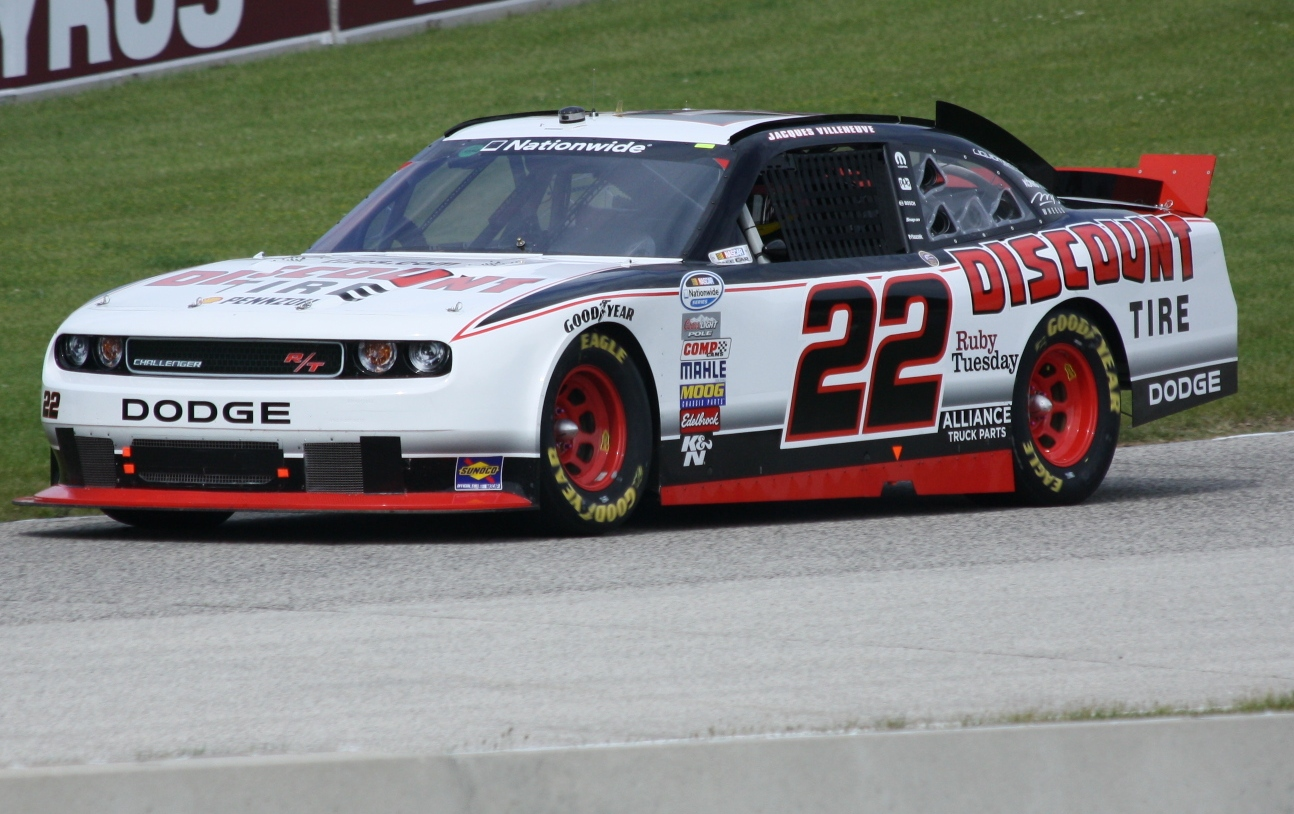
Villeneuve racing the No. 22 Dodge at the 2011 Bucyrus 200

Villeneuve drove the Road America and Montreal road course races of the 2011 NASCAR Nationwide Series for Penske Racing in its No. 22 Dodge Challenger in lieu of Brad Keselowski. He finished the Road America race third and qualified on pole position for the Montreal event but finished 27th despite leading 29 laps. In August 2011, he joined Shell V-Power Racing for the Stock Car Corrida do Milhão for the 2011 championship of Stock Car Brasil despite concerns about adapting to his car. Driving the No. 27 Peugeot 408, Villeneuve qualified 27th and finished eighteenth. He was employed by Penske to drive its No. 22 car at the Road America and Montreal road course races in the 2012 NASCAR Nationwide Series. Villeneuve finished sixth at Road America and third at Montreal.

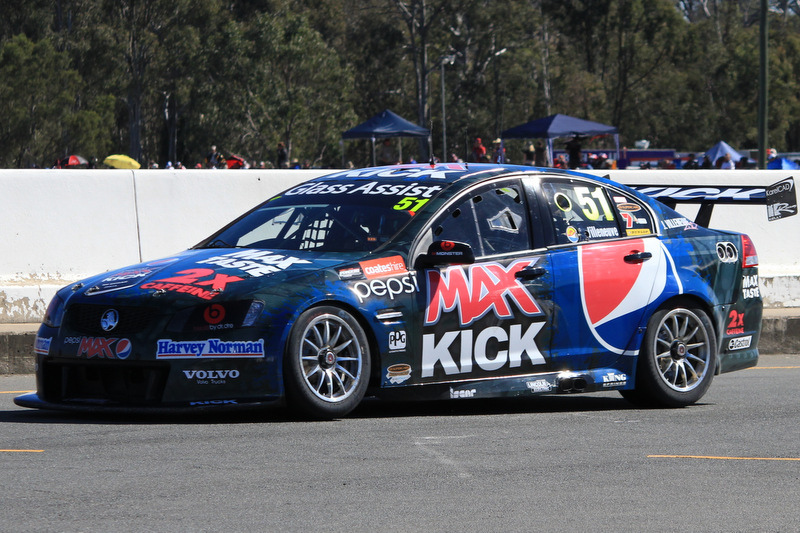
Villeneuve competing at the 2012 Coates Hire Ipswich 300

During the 2012 International V8 Supercars Championship, he filled in for the injured Greg Murphy for three rounds in Kelly Racing's No. 51 Holden Commodore, finishing no higher than 24th. He finished seventh sharing Vita4One's No. 34 BMW Z4 GT3 with Jos Verstappen at the City Challenge Baku GT event in October.

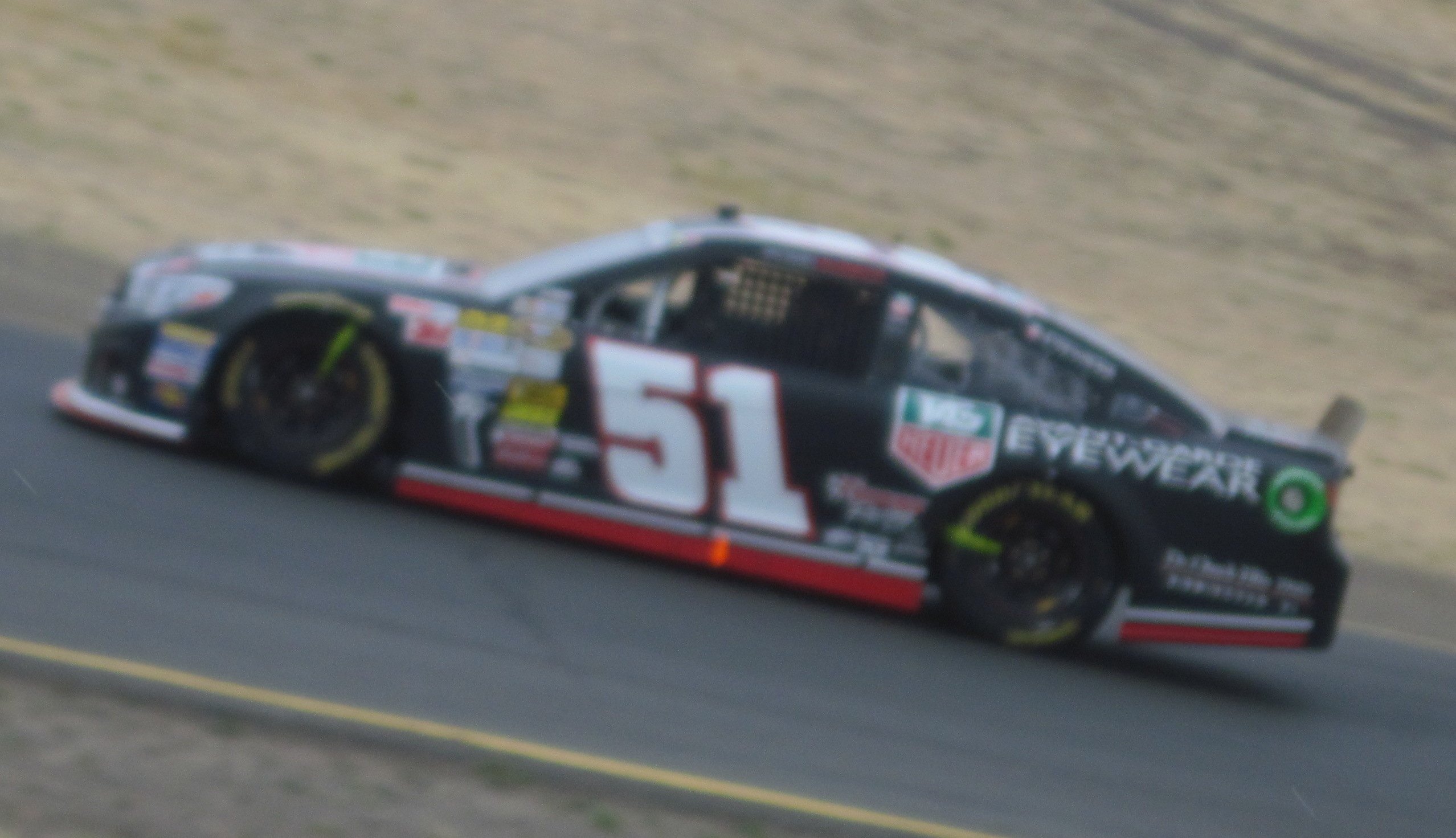
Villeneuve during the 2013 Toyota/Save Mart 350

When Villeneuve expressed interest in the International V8 Supercars Championship, he was considered for a full-time seat at Kelly Racing in the 2013, but no agreement was reached. For the first and only time, he partook in the Le Mans double header counting towards the 2013 season of the FFSA GT Championship, sharing the No. 27 Sport Garage-entered Ferrari 458 Italia GT3 with Éric Cayrolle. (Note: Villeneuve became aware of a possible entry to the FFSA GT Championship through team owner Christian Petit.) The duo finished 11th in the first race and retired from the next. (Note: Villeneuve and Cayrolle were entered for the Imola round but the entry failed to arrive.) Midway through the season, Villeneuve was hired by car owner James Finch to drive the Toyota/Save Mart 350 at Sonoma Raceway in the Sprint Cup Series for Phoenix Racing in its No. 51 Chevrolet SS, finishing 41st due to mechanical trouble after nineteen laps. Later that year, he finished fifth in the Grand Prix de Trois Rivieres (part of the Canadian Tire Series) in 22 Racing's Dodge Challenger.

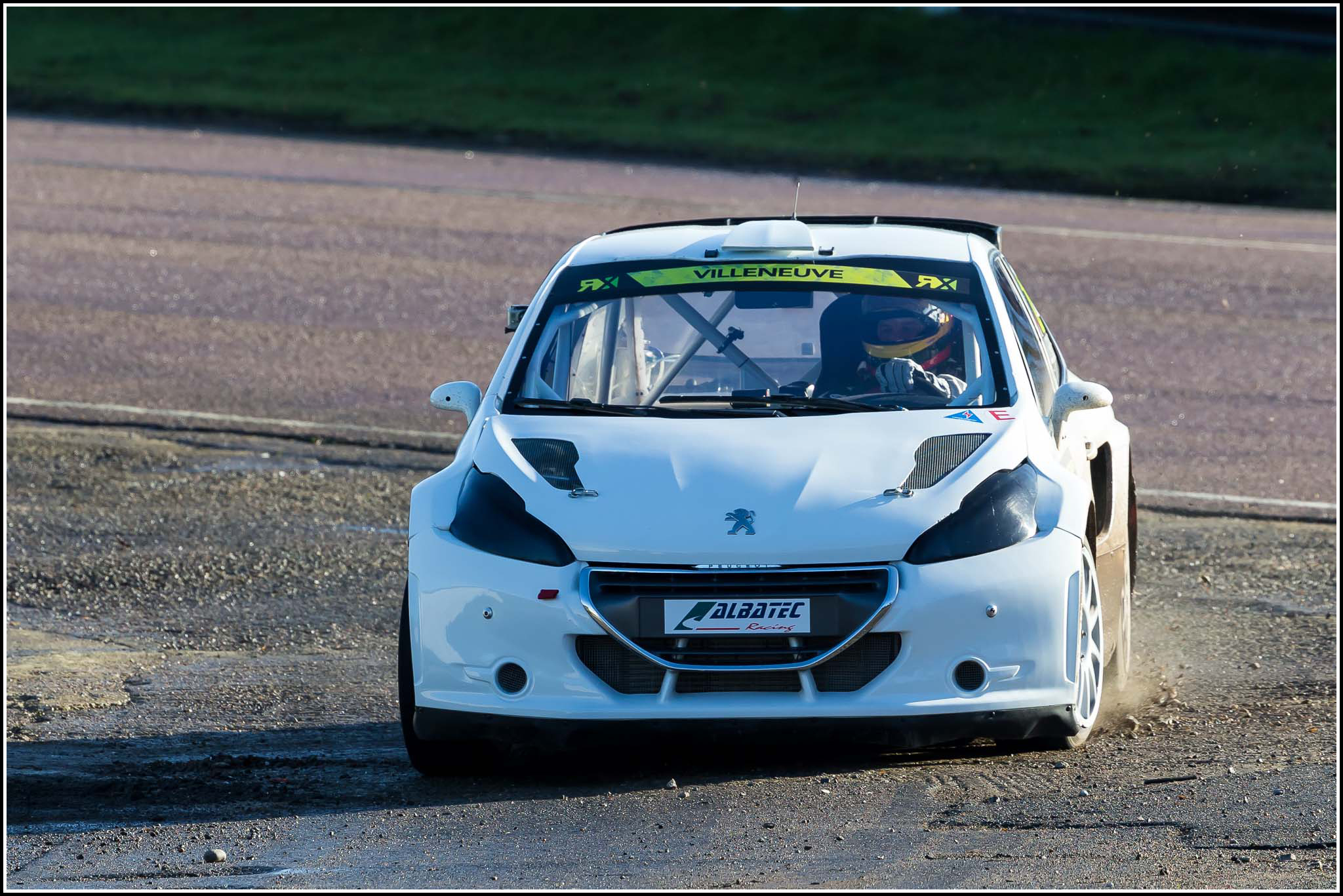
Villeneuve driving a Peugeot 208 Supercar at the 2014 World RX of Great Britain

In 2014, Villeneuve signed to drive an Albatec Racing-prepared Peugeot 208 Supercar part-time in the FIA World Rallycross Championship's inaugural season. He chose to do rallycross because he felt it was exciting for both drivers and spectators. In seven races, Villeneuve scored eight points for 37th in the Drivers' Championship. He was released before the season ended due to non-supportive statements he made concerning his team and rallycross. Villeneuve entered the Indianapolis 500 for the first time in 19 years, driving Schmidt Peterson Hamilton Motorsports' No. 5 Dallara DW12-Honda third car entry. (Note: He had a seat fitting at the team's factory on 20 March.) Though he had not planned to return to American open-wheel racing, he changed his mind after the 2012 introduction of a new car and engine formula. He qualified 27th and finished fourteenth. In August, Villeneuve finished 24th in Jacombs' No. 7 Dodge at Canadian Tire Series' Grand Prix de Trois Rivieres.

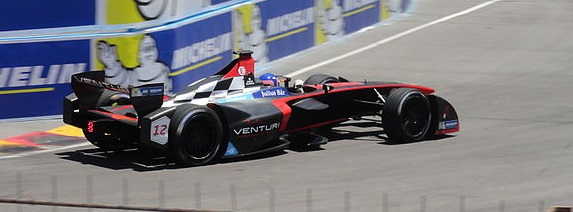
Villeneuve during qualifying at the 2015 Punta del Este ePrix

Villeneuve accepted an invitation to enter 2015 Stock Car Brasil's season-opening Autódromo Internacional Ayrton Senna round alongside Zonta in Shell Racing's No. 10 Chevrolet Sonic, placing 21st. He signed a contract to replace Heidfeld and partner with Stéphane Sarrazin at Venturi Grand Prix in the 2015–16 season of the all-electric Formula E series. Villeneuve had observed Formula E intently throughout 2014, admiring its bumpy city tracks. Guido Pastor called him to test a car, after which he got selected to drive. Villeneuve finished outside the top ten in the first two races and failed to start the Punta del Este ePrix due to an accident during qualifying. His relationship with Venturi cooled thereafter and they agreed to terminate their working relationship early in January 2016. Villeneuve signed a one-race agreement to return to rallycross in the 2018 season. He drove a Subaru Rally Team USA-entered WRX STi Supercar at the World RX of Canada (part of the Americas Rallycross Championship). He failed to qualify for the final following two accidents sustained during the second semi-final.

For the 2019 season, Villeneuve shared Scuderia Baldini 27's GT3 Pro-class No. 27 Ferrari 488 GT3 Evo with Giancarlo Fisichella and Stefano Gai in the Italian GT Championship, finishing fourth at the 3 Hours of Misano and second at the 3 Hours of Vallelunga. He raced as a guest driver at the Ring Knutstorp and Karlskoga Motorstadion rounds of the Porsche Carrera Cup Scandinavia in a MTech Competition-entered Porsche 911 GT3 Cup car, placing in the top-ten in the second race of both rounds. That year, he made his debut in NASCAR Whelen Euro Series in the Elite 1 Division. Villeneuve drove the No. 32 Go Fas Racing Chevrolet, finishing the season eighth in points with 431 scored, two pole positions and seven top-tens. For the 2020 season, he entered that year's Whelen Euro Series with FEED Vict Racing, a team owned by him and Patrick Lemarié. Driving four rounds in the No. 5 car, he achieved two top fives for 104 points (21st overall) in the Elite 1 Division. He drove Academy Motorsport's No. 5 car in the 2021 Whelen Euro Series, achieving his first two series victories in both races of the season's final round at Vallelunga, and scoring 331 points for ninth in the points standings with two wins and four top-ten finishes. He left the series after the season was over to focus on his F1 commentary commitments.

For 2022, Villeneuve returned to the NASCAR Cup Series as a part-time driver of the non-chartered No. 27 Team Hezeberg Ford. He aimed to assist Team Hezeberg in the launch of its Cup Series programme and he consented to assist with their effort in the Daytona 500. Villeneuve qualified for the race as of the fastest of the open non-charter teams; starting from fortieth, he finished the race in 22nd after an early-race half-spin and a subsequent collision with Tyler Reddick. In August, he failed to start the NASCAR Pinty's Series' Grand Prix de Trois-Rivières in the No. 7 Dumoulin Competition-prepared Dodge after accepting an offer by Festidrag Développement president Martin D'Anjou to enter the race.

For 2023, Villeneuve entered the first three rounds of the 2023 FIA World Endurance Championship alongside Tom Dillmann and Esteban Guerrieri in the Floyd Vanwall Racing Team's No. 4 non-hybrid Vanwall Vandervell 680-Gibson in the LMH category, although he was noncompetitive and was replaced by Tristan Vautier for the 24 Hours of Le Mans. He subsequently withdrew from the team for the rest of the season. Villeneuve made his Porsche Supercup debut as a guest driver of the No. 911 Porsche 911 Cup car for the 2026 season.

== Non-racing ventures and personal life ==
Villeneuve began writing lyrics while he was driving in Japan, and purchased a guitar in 1996. When he became uncertain whether he would remain at Sauber for the 2006 F1 season in November 2005, he elected to rent a professional recording studio in Paris in order to better hear his music. Travelling to England to record with the Tenebrae Choir, Villeneuve recorded nearly every day for a month before stopping to prioritise motor racing. That same year, he released his debut French single, "Accepterais-tu", and an acoustic rock album Private Paradise with 13 songs (nine in French and four in English) in 2007. Six songs each were written by Villeneuve and his friends; he also performed a cover of Women Come, Women Go by Gazebo. Villeneuve collaborated with vocalists Steve Smith and Amélie Veille. The album debuted at No. 49 on the Quebec pop charts and received negative media reviews. It sold 233 copies in Quebec and 836 in North America.

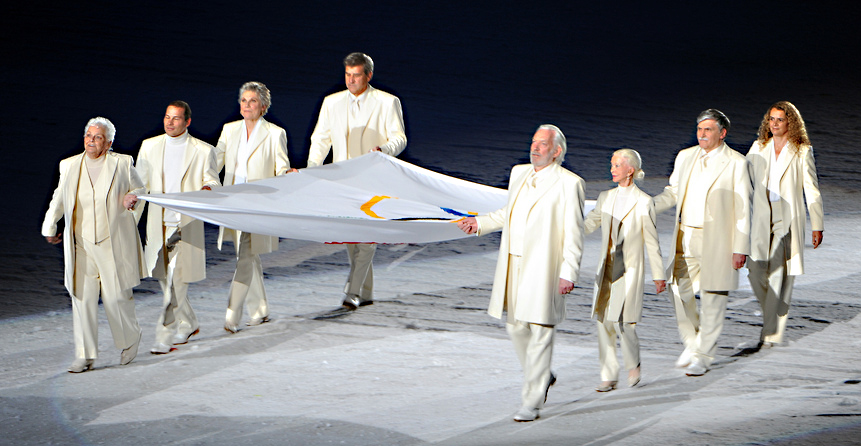
Villeneuve carrying the Olympic flag into BC Place during the 2010 Winter Olympics opening ceremony.

Villeneuve was a guest on 6 June 1995 and 2 June 1998 episodes of the Late Show with David Letterman. Villeneuve made a cameo appearance as a racing driver in the 2001 film Driven. He carried the Olympic torch in Old Montreal during the 2010 Winter Olympics torch relay in December 2009. Villeneuve also carried the Olympic flag at the opening ceremony. Villeneuve was employed by Disney France in late 2010, spending two days recording the French voice of David Hobbscap for the 2011 Pixar animated film Cars 2. The character was also renamed after him in the French dub. He analysed the 2012 Canadian Grand Prix and the 2024 Canadian Grand Prix for the British television channel Sky Sports F1. Since 2013, Villeneuve has commentated for the pay-TV services Sky Sport in Italy and Canal+ in France, and for Sky Sports in Britain at the 2025 Japanese Grand Prix. He co-founded and designed the Area 27 Motorsports Park racing track in Okanagan, British Columbia. Villeneuve computer-modeled the 4.83 km (3.0-mile) circuit with 16 turns and 357 feet of elevation change, aiming to capture the spirit of classic Grand Prix tracks. Villeneuve became an ambassador of the Williams Formula One team for the 2025 season.

Villeneuve was engaged firstly to a Montreal college student named Sandrine Gros D'Aillon, then to Australian pop singer Dannii Minogue and later American ballerina Ellen Green. Villeneuve's first marriage was to Parisian Johanna Martinez in May 2006. They had two children before divorcing in June 2009. In June 2012, he married Brazilian Camila Andrea López Lillo, with whom he has two children. Villeneuve married his third wife Giulia Marra, with whom he has a son and two daughters, at the 2023 Las Vegas Grand Prix.

== Tax evasion scandal ==
Since January 2017, Revenu Québec has pursued Villeneuve for $1.7 million in unpaid taxes after doing an audit of his business activities from 2010 to 2012. The October 2021 release of the Pandora Papers revealed that he had set up offshore companies in the tax-free jurisdictions of The Bahamas and the British Virgin Islands in the 1990s and early 2000s to receive endorsement and income and to avoid paying Canadian income tax. In the fiscal year of 2010, Villeneuve declared $6,431 of personal income, and even claimed a tax-credit for low-income families.

== Public image and personality ==
Journalist Gerald Donaldson describes Villeneuve as "engagingly eccentric, opinionated and outspoken" and one who "defied convention and challenged authority, saying exactly what he thought in an era when drivers were expected to express only sweet-talking platitudes." He was popular with the European press for his willingness to speak his mind in a time of political correctness. He publicly bemoaned F1's commercialised and commodified image, the sport's structure, focus on cheaper, younger, corporate groomed drivers, and the manufacturing of driver personalities by corporations so as not to impugn their reputation by drivers voicing their thoughts and opinions through the media. Villeneuve frequently dyed his hair in various colours and sported grunge street wear. His behaviour earned him multiple cautions from F1's governing body, the Fédération Internationale de l'Automobile (FIA), for bringing the series into disrepute. Max Mosley, the association's president, commented that Villeneuve's controversies would benefit him when he was no longer successful.

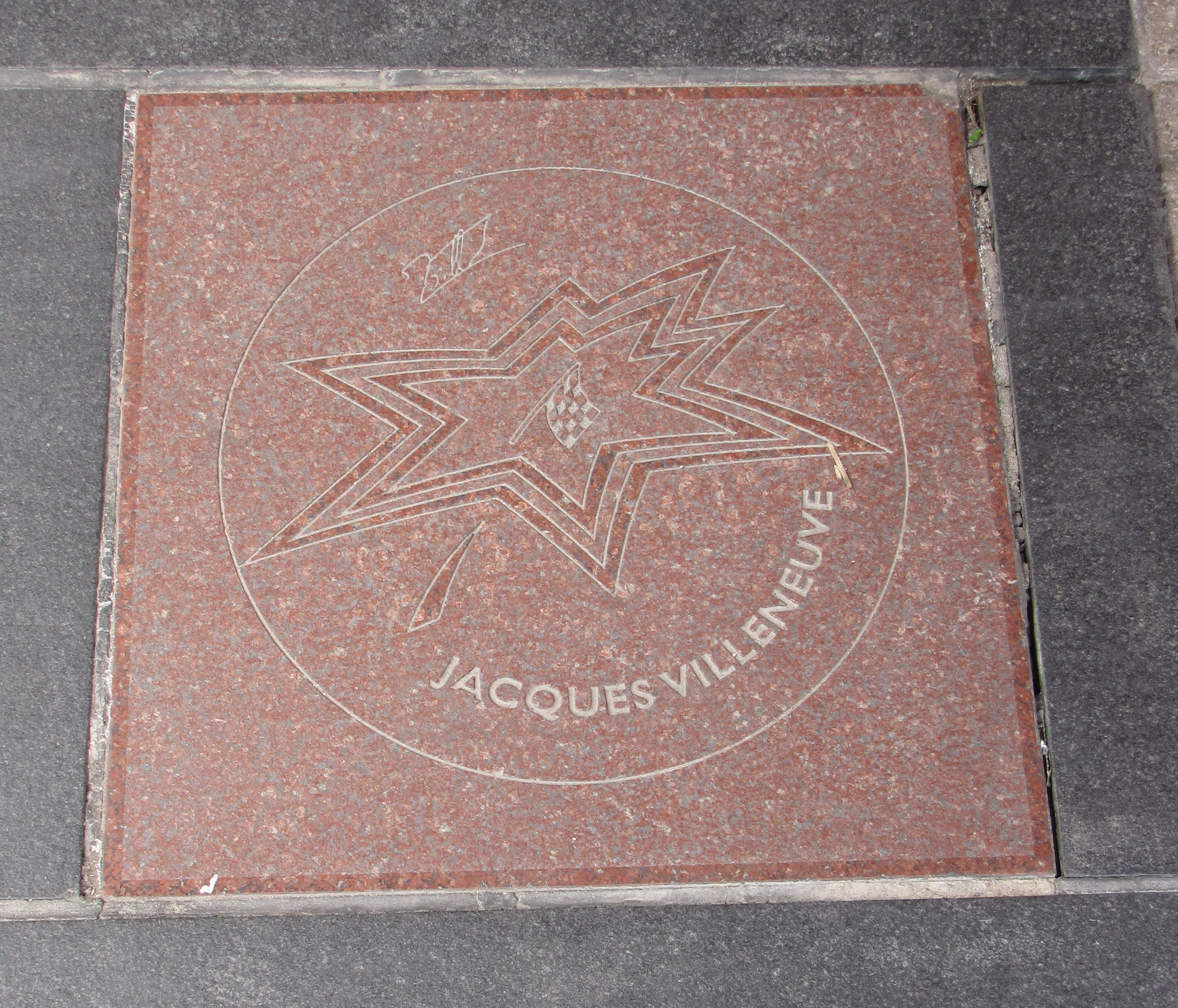
Villeneuve's star on Canada's Walk of Fame

Villeneuve's decision to be independent as much as possible from media relations to avoid over promotion was endorsed by Pollock. He refused to conduct substantial public relations duties for teams even after BAR attempted to purchase more public relations appearances for him, and he limited his commitments communicating to the press. Journalist Matt Bishop observed that Villeneuve was frequently criticised for refusing to do sponsorship functions and for his self-imposed limiting interactions with the press at Grands Prix, but Bishop noted others appreciated Villeneuve's focus on racing instead of "extraneous commitments". Villeneuve resisted to join the Grand Prix Drivers' Association (GPDA), which he believed would serve only the interests of drivers and not F1's. He finally joined in late 2000, feeling his views were being ignored. Villeneuve decided to resign in mid-2006 after the GPDA decided that Schumacher did not have to apologize nor face sanctions for purposely stopping during qualifying for the 2006 Monaco Grand Prix, despite Villeneuve's protests, and Schumacher remained president of the GPDA.

Villeneuve was voted the winner of the Lorenzo Bandini Trophy in 1996, and both the Lou Marsh Trophy and the Lionel Conacher Award in 1995 and 1997. Villeneuve received the Hawthorn Memorial Trophy for 1997 as the most successful British or Commonwealth driver over the course of a season. In April 1998, he was appointed Officer of the National Order of Quebec but collected the honour at the following year's ceremony due to his racing commitments. He was added to Canada's Walk of Fame two months later. In December 2010, Villeneuve was inducted into the athlete category of Canada's Sports Hall of Fame. He was added to both the FIA Hall of Fame and the Canadian Motorsport Hall of Fame seven and eight years later respectively.

=== Driving ability and racing helmet ===
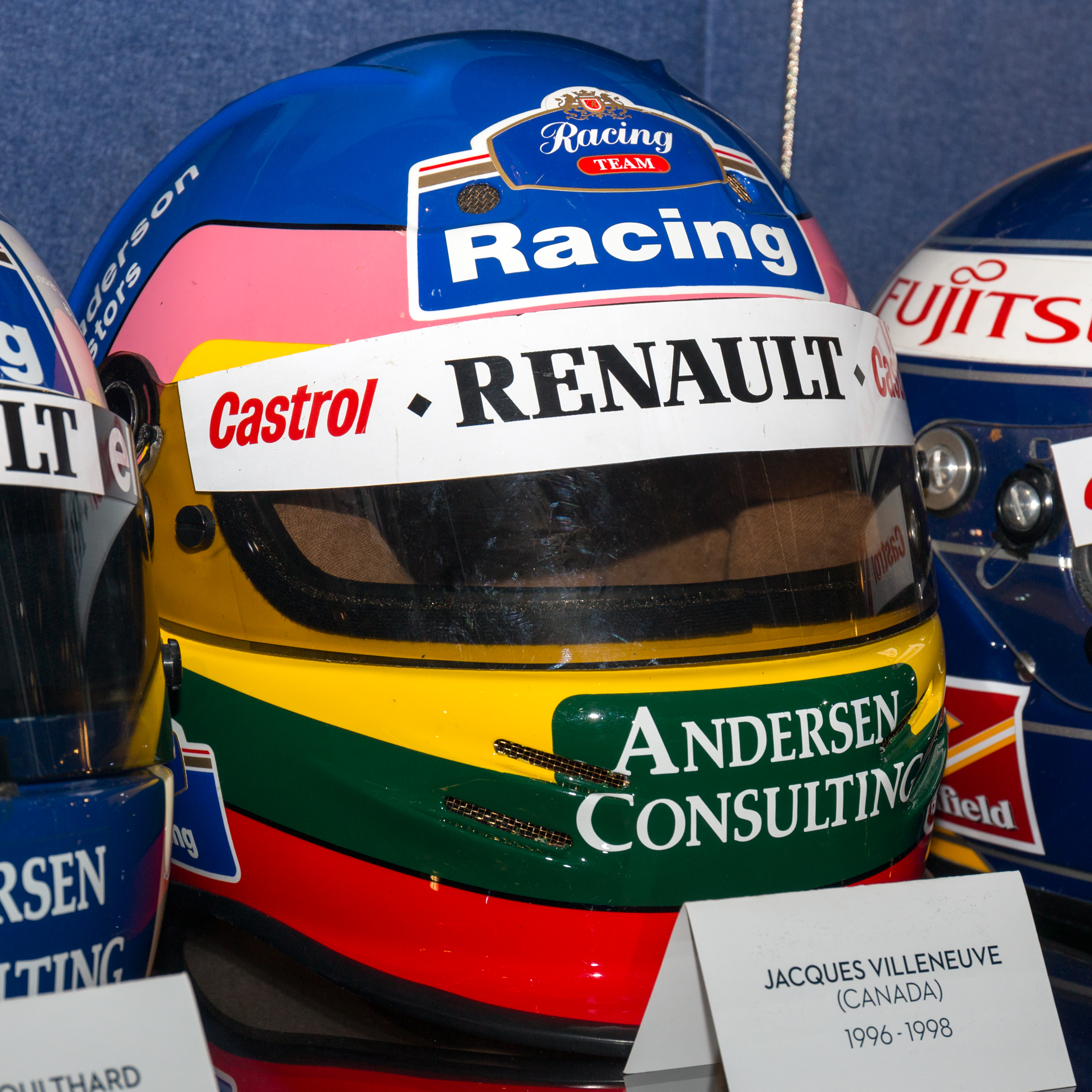
Villeneuve's racing helmet on display at the Williams Conference Centre in 2017

Journalist Mark Hughes describes Villeneuve's driving as "spectacular" and "hard-charging". Villeneuve frequently went past the edge of the available track to increase his momentum as much as possible. He provided his engineers with suggestions that Maurice Hamilton wrote were "so far from the norm to the point of diametrically opposed to standard practice, sometimes giving the impression of being pursued just for the hell of it." Villeneuve prefers driving on slick tyres and with no electronic driver aids. He found driver aids difficult and thus ran with less traction control than his teammates since he could not deal with either the anti-lock system on the rear brakes or heavy traction control. This required Villeneuve to modify his driving style and take fewer risks until his exit from F1 in 2006. He switched from wearing spectacles in his helmet to contact lenses in 1994 after his spectacles vibrated slightly on minor bumps in Indianapolis.

Villeneuve based the design of his racing helmet on his father's, reportedly drawing it on a doodling pad. He looked at a photograph of his mother wearing a pink, yellow, green and blue V-shaped striped polo shirt at a motor race her husband was competing at, and he used her pencils to produce the design. Villeneuve incorporated an inverted V-style swoosh with varying thickness of colours around the shape on the helmet's two sides. He retained a single black line from his first design in the centre to divide the colours without difficulty. (Note: He previously wore a helmet in the colours of his sponsor Player's.)

== Racing results ==
=== Career summary ===
| Season | Series | Team | Races | Wins | Poles | Points | Position |
|---|---|---|---|---|---|---|---|
| 1989 | Italian Formula Three Championship | Prema Racing | 6 | 0 | 0 | 0 | – |
| 1990 | Italian Formula Three Championship | Prema Racing | 12 | 0 | 0 | 10 | 13th |
| 1991 | Italian Formula Three Championship | Prema Racing | 11 | 0 | 3 | 20 | 6th |
| 1992 | All-Japan Formula Three Championship | TOM'S | 11 | 3 | 2 | 45 | **2nd** |
| 1992 | All-Japan Sports Prototype Championship | Toyota Team TOM'S | 1 | 0 | 0 | N/A | NC |
| 1992 | Toyota Atlantic Championship | Comprep/Player's | 1 | 0 | 0 | 14 | 28th |
| 1993 | Toyota Atlantic Championship | Forsythe/Green Racing | 15 | 5 | 7 | 185 | **3rd** |
| 1993 | Macau Grand Prix | March Racing | 1 | 0 | 0 | N/A | NC |
| 1994 | PPG Indy Car World Series | Forsythe/Green Racing | 15 | 1 | 0 | 94 | 6th |
| 1995 | PPG Indy Car World Series | Team Green | 17 | 4 | 6 | 172 | **1st** |
| 1996 | Formula One | Rothmans Williams Renault | 16 | 4 | 3 | 78 | **2nd** |
| 1997 | Formula One | Rothmans Williams Renault | 17 | 7 | 10 | 81 | **1st** |
| 1998 | Formula One | Winfield Williams | 16 | 0 | 0 | 21 | 5th |
| 1999 | Formula One | British American Racing | 16 | 0 | 0 | 0 | 21st |
| 2000 | Formula One | Lucky Strike BAR Honda | 17 | 0 | 0 | 17 | 7th |
| 2001 | Formula One | Lucky Strike BAR Honda | 17 | 0 | 0 | 12 | 7th |
| 2002 | Formula One | Lucky Strike BAR Honda | 17 | 0 | 0 | 4 | 12th |
| 2003 | Formula One | Lucky Strike BAR Honda | 14 | 0 | 0 | 6 | 16th |
| 2004 | Formula One | Mild Seven Renault F1 Team | 3 | 0 | 0 | 0 | 21st |
| 2005 | Formula One | Sauber Petronas | 18 | 0 | 0 | 9 | 14th |
| 2006 | Formula One | BMW Sauber F1 Team | 12 | 0 | 0 | 7 | 15th |
| 2007 | NASCAR Nextel Cup Series | Bill Davis Racing Toyota | 2 | 0 | 0 | 140 | 60th |
| 2007 | NASCAR Craftsman Truck Series | Bill Davis Racing Toyota | 7 | 0 | 0 | 615 | 59th |
| 2007 | 24 Hours of Le Mans | Team Peugeot Total | 1 | 0 | 0 | N/A | NC |
| 2008 | NASCAR Nationwide Series | Braun Racing Toyota | 1 | 0 | 0 | 120 | 111th |
| 2008 | Speedcar Series | Speedcar Team | 4 | 0 | 0 | 3 | 13th |
| 2008 | Le Mans Series | Team Peugeot Total | 1 | 1 | 0 | 10 | 9th |
| 2008 | 24 Hours of Le Mans | Team Peugeot Total | 1 | 0 | 0 | N/A | **2nd** |
| 2008 | Top Race V6 | Oro Racing Team | 1 | 0 | 0 | 0 | NC |
| 2008–09 | Speedcar Series | Durango | 5 | 0 | 0 | 7 | 11th |
| 2009 | NASCAR Nationwide Series | Braun Racing Toyota | 1 | 0 | 0 | 165 | 107th |
| 2009 | NASCAR Canadian Tire Series | Jacombs Racing Ford | 2 | 0 | 0 | 257 | 33rd |
| 2009 | Top Race V6 | | 2 | 0 | 0 | 0 | NC |
| 2009 | FIA GT Championship | Gravity Racing International | 1 | 0 | 0 | 0 | NC |
| 2010 | NASCAR Sprint Cup Series | Braun Racing Toyota | 1 | 0 | 0 | 76 | 69th |
| 2010 | NASCAR Nationwide Series | Braun Racing Toyota | 3 | 0 | 0 | 405 | 77th |
| 2010 | V8 Supercar Championship Series | Rod Nash Racing | 2 | 0 | 0 | N/A | NC |
| 2011 | NASCAR Nationwide Series | Penske Racing | 2 | 0 | 1 | 61 | 52nd |
| 2011 | Stock Car Brasil | Shell V-Power Racing | 1 | 0 | 0 | N/A | NC |
| 2012 | NASCAR Nationwide Series | Penske Racing | 2 | 0 | 0 | 82 | 49th |
| 2012 | International V8 Supercars Championship | Kelly Racing | 6 | 0 | 0 | N/A | NC |
| 2013 | NASCAR Sprint Cup Series | Phoenix Racing | 1 | 0 | 0 | 3 | 51st |
| 2013 | NASCAR Canadian Tire Series | Dave Jacombs | 1 | 0 | 0 | 43 | 43rd |
| 2014 | IndyCar Series | Schmidt Peterson Motorsports | 1 | 0 | 0 | 29 | 30th |
| 2014 | World Rallycross Championship | Albatec Racing | 8 | 0 | 0 | 8 | 38th |
| 2014 | NASCAR Canadian Tire Series | Dave Jacombs | 1 | 0 | 0 | 20 | 54th |
| 2015 | Stock Car Brasil | Shell Racing | 1 | 0 | 0 | 0 | NC |
| 2015–16 | Formula E | Venturi Grand Prix | 3 | 0 | 0 | 0 | 20th |
| 2018 | Americas Rallycross Championship | Subaru Rally Team USA | 1 | 0 | 0 | 12 | 14th |
| 2019 | NASCAR Whelen Euro Series | Go Fas Racing | 13 | 0 | 2 | 431 | 8th |
| 2019 | Porsche Carrera Cup Scandinavia | Mtech Competition | 4 | 0 | 0 | 0 | NC† |
| 2020 | NASCAR Whelen Euro Series | FEED Vict Racing | 4 | 0 | 0 | 104 | 21st |
| 2021 | NASCAR Whelen Euro Series | Academy Motorsport | 8 | 2 | 1 | 331 | 9th |
| 2022 | NASCAR Cup Series | Team Hezeberg by Reaume Brothers Racing | 1 | 0 | 0 | 15 | 36th |
| 2022 | NASCAR Pinty's Series | Dumoulin Compétition | 0 | 0 | 0 | 18 | 51st |
| 2023 | FIA World Endurance Championship – Hypercar | Floyd Vanwall Racing Team | 3 | 0 | 0 | 6 | 18th |
| 2026 | Porsche Supercup | Porsche Motorsport | 6 | 0 | 0 | 0 | NC† |

^{†} As Villeneuve was a guest driver, he was ineligible for points.

=== American open-wheel racing results ===
==== Toyota Atlantic Championship ====
Toyota Atlantic results
| Year | Team | 1 | 2 | 3 | 4 | 5 | 6 | 7 | 8 | 9 | 10 | 11 | 12 | 13 | 14 | 15 | Rank | Points |
|---|---|---|---|---|---|---|---|---|---|---|---|---|---|---|---|---|---|---|
| 1992 | Comprep/Player's | MIA | PHX | LBH | LIM | MON | WGL | TOR | TRR; 3 | VAN | MOH | MOS | NAZ | LS1 | LS2 | | **14th** | **28** |
| 1993 | Forsythe/Green Racing | PHX; 18 | **LBH**; 2 | **ATL**; 1 | MIL; 17 | MON; 1 | MOS; 2 | HAL; 7 | TOR; 3 | **LOU**; 2 | **TRR**; 14 | VAN; 19 | **MOH**; 1 | NAZ; 11 | **LS1**; 1 | **LS2**; 1 | 3rd | 185 |

==== CART ====
CART results
| Year | Team | No. | 1 | 2 | 3 | 4 | 5 | 6 | 7 | 8 | 9 | 10 | 11 | 12 | 13 | 14 | 15 | 16 | 17 | Rank | Points | Ref |
|---|---|---|---|---|---|---|---|---|---|---|---|---|---|---|---|---|---|---|---|---|---|---|
| 1994 | Forsythe/Green Racing | 12 | SRF; 17 | PHX; 25 | LBH; 15 | INDY; 2 | MIL; 9 | DET; 7 | POR; 6 | CLE; 4 | TOR; 9 | MCH; 20 | MOH; 9 | NHA; 24 | VAN; 24 | ROA; 1 | NAZ; 7 | LAG; 3 | | 6th | 94 | |
| 1995 | Team Green | 27 | MIA; 1 | SRF; 20 | PHX; 5 | LBH; 25 | NAZ; 2 | INDY; 1 | MIL; 6 | DET; 9 | **POR**; 20 | **ROA**; 1 | **TOR**; 3 | CLE; 1 | MCH; 10 | **MOH**; 3 | NHA; 4 | **VAN**; 12 | **LAG**; 11 | 1st | 172 | |

==== IndyCar Series ====
IndyCar Series results
| Year | Team | No. | Chassis | Engine | 1 | 2 | 3 | 4 | 5 | 6 | 7 | 8 | 9 | 10 | 11 | 12 | 13 | 14 | 15 | 16 | 17 | 18 | Rank | Points | Ref |
|---|---|---|---|---|---|---|---|---|---|---|---|---|---|---|---|---|---|---|---|---|---|---|---|---|---|
| 2014 | Schmidt Peterson Hamilton Motorsports | 5 | Dallara DW12 | Honda | STP | LBH | ALA | IMS | INDY; 14 | DET | DET | TXS | HOU | HOU | POC | IOW | TOR | TOR | MOH | MIL | SNM | FON | 30th | 29 | |

==== Indianapolis 500 ====
| Year | Chassis | Engine | Start | Finish | Team |
|---|---|---|---|---|---|
| 1994 | Reynard 94I | Ford XB | 4 | 2 | Forsythe/Green Racing |
| 1995 | Reynard 95I | Ford XB | 5 | **1** | Team Green |
| 2014 | Dallara | Honda | 27 | 14 | Schmidt Peterson Motorsports |

=== Formula One ===
Formula One results
| Year | Entrant | Chassis | Engine | 1 | 2 | 3 | 4 | 5 | 6 | 7 | 8 | 9 | 10 | 11 | 12 | 13 | 14 | 15 | 16 | 17 | 18 | 19 | WDC | Points |
|---|---|---|---|---|---|---|---|---|---|---|---|---|---|---|---|---|---|---|---|---|---|---|---|---|
| 1996 | Rothmans Williams Renault | Williams FW18 | Renault RS8 3.0 V10 | **AUS**; 2 | BRA; Ret | ARG; 2 | EUR; 1 | SMR; 11^{†} | MON; Ret | ESP; 3 | CAN; 2 | FRA; 2 | GBR; 1 | GER; 3 | HUN; 1 | **BEL**; 2 | ITA; 7 | POR; 1 | **JPN**; Ret | | | | **2nd** | **78** |
| 1997 | Rothmans Williams Renault | Williams FW19 | Renault RS9 3.0 V10 | **AUS**; Ret | **BRA**; 1 | **ARG**; 1 | **SMR**; Ret | MON; Ret | **ESP**; 1 | CAN; Ret | FRA; 4 | **GBR**; 1 | GER; Ret | HUN; 1 | **BEL**; 5 | ITA; 5 | **AUT**; 1 | LUX; 1 | **JPN**; DSQ | **EUR**; 3 | | | **1st** | **81** |
| 1998 | Winfield Williams | Williams FW20 | Mecachrome GC37-01 V10 | AUS; 5 | BRA; 7 | ARG; Ret | SMR; 4 | ESP; 6 | MON; 5 | CAN; 10 | FRA; 4 | GBR; 7 | AUT; 6 | GER; 3 | HUN; 3 | BEL; Ret | ITA; Ret | LUX; 8 | JPN; 6 | | | | 5th | 21 |
| 1999 | British American Racing | BAR 01 | Supertec FB01 3.0 V10 | AUS; Ret | BRA; Ret | SMR; Ret | MON; Ret | ESP; Ret | CAN; Ret | FRA; Ret | GBR; Ret | AUT; Ret | GER; Ret | HUN; Ret | BEL; 15 | ITA; 8 | EUR; 10^{†} | MAL; Ret | JPN; 9 | | | | 21st | 0 |
| 2000 | Lucky Strike Reynard BAR Honda | BAR 002 | Honda RA000E 3.0 V10 | AUS; 4 | BRA; Ret | SMR; 5 | GBR; 16^{†} | ESP; Ret | EUR; Ret | MON; 7 | CAN; 15^{†} | FRA; 4 | AUT; 4 | GER; 8 | HUN; 12 | BEL; 7 | ITA; Ret | USA; 4 | JPN; 6 | MAL; 5 | | | 7th | 17 |
| 2001 | Lucky Strike BAR Honda | BAR 003 | Honda RA001E 3.0 V10 | AUS; Ret | MAL; Ret | BRA; 7 | SMR; Ret | ESP; 3 | AUT; 8 | MON; 4 | CAN; Ret | EUR; 9 | FRA; Ret | GBR; 8 | GER; 3 | HUN; 9 | BEL; 8 | ITA; 6 | USA; Ret | JPN; 10 | | | 7th | 12 |
| 2002 | Lucky Strike BAR Honda | BAR 004 | Honda RA002E 3.0 V10 | AUS; Ret | MAL; 8 | BRA; 10^{†} | SMR; 7 | ESP; 7 | AUT; 10^{†} | MON; Ret | CAN; Ret | EUR; 12 | GBR; 4 | FRA; Ret | GER; Ret | HUN; Ret | BEL; 8 | ITA; 9 | USA; 6 | JPN; Ret | | | 12th | 4 |
| 2003 | Lucky Strike BAR Honda | BAR 005 | Honda RA003E 3.0 V10 | AUS; 9 | MAL; DNS | BRA; 6 | SMR; Ret | ESP; Ret | AUT; 12 | MON; Ret | CAN; Ret | EUR; Ret | FRA; 9 | GBR; 10 | GER; 9 | HUN; Ret | ITA; 6 | USA; Ret | JPN | | | | 16th | 6 |
| 2004 | Mild Seven Renault F1 Team | Renault R24 | Renault RS24 3.0 V10 | AUS | MAL | BHR | SMR | ESP | MON | EUR | CAN | USA | FRA | GBR | GER | HUN | BEL | ITA | CHN; 11 | JPN; 10 | BRA; 10 | | 21st | 0 |
| 2005 | Sauber Petronas | Sauber C24 | Petronas 05A 3.0 V10 | AUS; 13 | MAL; Ret | BHR; 11^{†} | SMR; 4 | ESP; Ret | MON; 11 | EUR; 13 | CAN; 9 | USA; DNS | FRA; 8 | GBR; 14 | GER; 15 | HUN; Ret | TUR; 11 | ITA; 11 | BEL; 6 | BRA; 12 | JPN; 12 | CHN; 10 | 14th | 9 |
| 2006 | BMW Sauber F1 Team | BMW Sauber F1.06 | BMW P86 2.4 V8 | BHR; Ret | MAL; 7 | AUS; 6 | SMR; 12 | EUR; 8 | ESP; 12 | MON; 14 | GBR; 8 | CAN; Ret | USA; Ret | FRA; 11 | GER; Ret | HUN | TUR | ITA | CHN | JPN | BRA | | 15th | 7 |

^{†} Did not finish, but was classified as he had completed more than 90% of the race distance.

=== Sports car career ===
==== 24 Hours of Le Mans ====
24 Hours of Le Mans results
| Year | Team | Co-drivers | Car | Class | Laps | Pos. | Class pos. |
|---|---|---|---|---|---|---|---|
| 2007 | (France) Team Peugeot Total | (France) Nicolas Minassian (Spain) Marc Gené | Peugeot 908 HDi FAP | LMP1 | 338 | DNF | DNF |
| 2008 | (France) Team Peugeot Total | (France) Nicolas Minassian (Spain) Marc Gené | Peugeot 908 HDi FAP | LMP1 | 381 | **2nd** | **2nd** |

==== Le Mans Series ====
Le Mans Series results
| Year | Entrant | Class | Chassis | Engine | 1 | 2 | 3 | 4 | 5 | Rank | Points |
|---|---|---|---|---|---|---|---|---|---|---|---|
| 2008 | Team Peugeot Total | LMP1 | Peugeot 908 HDi FAP | Peugeot HDI 5.5 L Turbo V12 (Diesel) | CAT | MON | SPA; 1 | NÜR | SIL | 9th | 10 |

==== Complete 24 Hours of Spa results ====
24 Hours of Spa results
| Year | Class | Tyres | Car | Team | Co-drivers | Laps | Pos. | Class pos. |
|---|---|---|---|---|---|---|---|---|
| 2009 | G2 | **M** | Mosler MT900 R GT3; Chevrolet LS7 7.0 L V8 | (Belgium) Gravity Racing International | (Belgium) Vincent Radermecker (Belgium) Loris de Sordi (China) Ho-Pin Tung | 65 | DNF | |

=== NASCAR ===
(key) (Bold – Pole position awarded by qualifying time. Italics – Pole position earned by points standings or practice time. * – Most laps led.)

==== Cup Series ====
NASCAR Cup Series results
| Year | Team | No. | Make | 1 | 2 | 3 | 4 | 5 | 6 | 7 | 8 | 9 | 10 | 11 | 12 | 13 | 14 | 15 | 16 | 17 | 18 | 19 | 20 | 21 | 22 | 23 | 24 | 25 | 26 | 27 | 28 | 29 | 30 | 31 | 32 | 33 | 34 | 35 | 36 | NSCC | Pts | Ref |
|---|---|---|---|---|---|---|---|---|---|---|---|---|---|---|---|---|---|---|---|---|---|---|---|---|---|---|---|---|---|---|---|---|---|---|---|---|---|---|---|---|---|---|
| 2007 | Bill Davis Racing | 27 | Toyota | DAY | CAL | LVS | ATL | BRI | MAR | TEX | PHO | TAL | RCH | DAR | CLT | DOV | POC | MCH | SON | NHA | DAY | CHI | IND | POC | GLN | MCH | BRI | CAL | RCH | NHA | DOV | KAN | TAL; 21 | CLT | MAR | ATL | TEX | PHO; 41 | HOM | 60th | 140 | |
| 2008 | Bill Davis Racing | 27 | Toyota | DAY; DNQ | CAL | LVS | ATL | BRI | MAR | TEX | PHO | TAL | RCH | DAR | CLT | DOV | POC | MCH | SON | NHA | DAY | CHI | IND | POC | GLN | MCH | BRI | CAL | RCH | NHA | DOV | KAN | TAL | CLT | MAR | ATL | TEX | PHO | HOM | NA | 0 | |
| 2010 | Braun Racing | 32 | Toyota | DAY | CAL | LVS | ATL | BRI | MAR | PHO | TEX | TAL | RCH | DAR | DOV | CLT | POC | MCH | SON | NHA | DAY | CHI | IND; 29 | POC | GLN | MCH | BRI | ATL | RCH | NHA | DOV | KAN | CAL | CLT | MAR | TAL | TEX | PHO | HOM | 69th | 76 | |
| 2013 | Phoenix Racing | 51 | Chevy | DAY | PHO | LVS | BRI | CAL | MAR | TEX | KAN | RCH | TAL | DAR | CLT | DOV | POC | MCH | SON; 41 | KEN | DAY | NHA | IND | POC | GLN | MCH | BRI | ATL | RCH | CHI | NHA | DOV | KAN | CLT | TAL | MAR | TEX | PHO | HOM | 51st | 3 | |
| 2022 | Team Hezeberg | 27 | Ford | DAY; 22 | CAL | LVS | PHO | ATL | COA | RCH | MAR | BRD | TAL | DOV | DAR | KAN | CLT | GTW | SON | NSH | ROA | ATL | NHA | POC | IRC | MCH | RCH | GLN | DAY | DAR | KAN | BRI | TEX | TAL | ROV | LVS | HOM | MAR | PHO | 36th | 15 | |

===== Daytona 500 =====
| Year | Team | Manufacturer | Start | Finish | Ref |
|---|---|---|---|---|---|
| 2008 | Bill Davis Racing | Toyota | DNQ | | |
| 2022 | Team Hezeberg | Ford | 40 | 22 | |

==== Nationwide Series ====
NASCAR Nationwide Series results
| Year | Team | No. | Make | 1 | 2 | 3 | 4 | 5 | 6 | 7 | 8 | 9 | 10 | 11 | 12 | 13 | 14 | 15 | 16 | 17 | 18 | 19 | 20 | 21 | 22 | 23 | 24 | 25 | 26 | 27 | 28 | 29 | 30 | 31 | 32 | 33 | 34 | 35 | NNSC | Pts | Ref |
|---|---|---|---|---|---|---|---|---|---|---|---|---|---|---|---|---|---|---|---|---|---|---|---|---|---|---|---|---|---|---|---|---|---|---|---|---|---|---|---|---|---|
| 2008 | Braun Racing | 32 | Toyota | DAY | CAL | LVS | ATL | BRI | NSH | TEX | PHO | MEX | TAL | RCH | DAR | CLT | DOV | NSH | KEB | MIL | NHA | DAY | CHI | GTY | IRP | CGV; 16 | GLN | MCH | BRI | CAL | RCH | DOV | KAN | CLT | MEM | TEX | PHO | HOM | 111th | 120 | |
| 2009 | Braun Racing | 32 | Toyota | DAY | CAL | LVS | BRI | TEX | NSH | PHO | TAL | RCH | DAR | CLT | DOV | NSH | KEN | MIL | NHA | DAY | CHI | GTY | IRP | IOW | GLN | MCH | BRI | CGV; 4 | ATL | RCH | DOV | KAN | CAL | CLT | MEM | TEX | PHO | HOM | 107th | 165 | |
| 2010 | Braun Racing | 32 | Toyota | DAY | CAL | LVS | BRI | NSH | PHO | TEX | TAL | RCH | DAR | DOV | CLT | NSH | KEN | ROA; 25 | NHA | DAY | CHI | GTY | IRP | IOW | GLN; 8 | MCH | BRI | CGV; 3 | ATL | RCH | DOV | KAN | CAL | CLT | GTY | TEX | PHO | HOM | 77th | 405 | |
| 2011 | Penske Racing | 22 | Dodge | DAY | PHO | LVS | BRI | CAL | TEX | TAL | NSH | RCH | DAR | DOV | IOW | CLT | CHI | MCH | ROA; 3 | DAY | KEN | NHA | NSH | IRP | IOW | GLN | **CGV**; 27* | BRI | ATL | RCH | CHI | DOV | KAN | CLT | TEX | PHO | HOM | | 52nd | 61 | |
| 2012 | Penske Racing | 22 | Dodge | DAY | PHO | LVS | BRI | CAL | TEX | RCH | TAL | DAR | IOW | CLT | DOV | MCH | ROA; 6 | KEN | DAY | NHA | CHI | IND | IOW | GLN | CGV; 3* | BRI | ATL | RCH | CHI | KEN | DOV | CLT | KAN | TEX | PHO | HOM | | | 49th | 82 | |

==== Craftsman Truck Series ====
NASCAR Craftsman Truck Series results
| Year | Team | No. | Truck | 1 | 2 | 3 | 4 | 5 | 6 | 7 | 8 | 9 | 10 | 11 | 12 | 13 | 14 | 15 | 16 | 17 | 18 | 19 | 20 | 21 | 22 | 23 | 24 | 25 | NCTC | Pts | Ref |
|---|---|---|---|---|---|---|---|---|---|---|---|---|---|---|---|---|---|---|---|---|---|---|---|---|---|---|---|---|---|---|---|
| 2007 | Bill Davis Racing | 27 | Toyota | DAY | CAL | ATL | MAR | KAN | LOW | MAN | DOV | TEX | MCH | MIL | MEM | KEN | IRP | NSH | BRI | GTY | NHA | LVS; 21 | TAL; 30 | MAR; 32 | ATL; 14 | TEX; 25 | PHO; 19 | HOM; 36 | 42nd | 615 | |

==== Pinty's Series ====
NASCAR Pinty's Series results
| Year | Team | No. | Make | 1 | 2 | 3 | 4 | 5 | 6 | 7 | 8 | 9 | 10 | 11 | 12 | 13 | Rank | Points | Ref |
|---|---|---|---|---|---|---|---|---|---|---|---|---|---|---|---|---|---|---|---|
| 2009 | Jacombs Racing | 7 | Ford | ASE | DEL | MSP | ASE; 22 | MPS | EDM | SAS | MSP | CTR; 4 | CGV | BAR | RIS | KWA | 33rd | 257 | |
| 2013 | 22 Racing | 24 | Dodge | MSP | DEL | MSP | ICAR | MPS | SAS | ASE | CTR; 3* | RIS | MSP | BAR | KWA | | 43rd | 43 | |
| 2014 | Jacombs Racing | 7 | Dodge | MSP | ACD | ICAR | EIR | SAS | ASE | CTR; 24 | RIS | MSP | BAR | KWA | | | 60th | 20 | |
| 2022 | Dumoulin Competition | 07 | Dodge | SUN | MSP | ACD | AVE | TOR | EDM | SAS | SAS | CTR; DNS | OSK | ICAR | MSP | DEL | 51st | 18 | |

==== Whelen Euro Series – EuroNASCAR PRO ====
(key) (Bold – Pole position. Italics – Fastest lap. * – Most laps led. ^ – Most positions gained)

NASCAR Whelen Euro Series – EuroNASCAR PRO results
| Year | Team | No. | Make | 1 | 2 | 3 | 4 | 5 | 6 | 7 | 8 | 9 | 10 | 11 | 12 | 13 | NWES | Pts | Ref |
|---|---|---|---|---|---|---|---|---|---|---|---|---|---|---|---|---|---|---|---|
| 2019 | Go Fas Racing | 32 | Chevy | VAL; 11 | VAL; 25 | FRA; 3 | FRA; 3 | BRH; 15 | BRH; 8 | MOS; 22 | MOS; 19 | **VEN**; 3* | HOC; 5 | HOC; 7 | ZOL; 14 | **ZOL**; 7 | 8th | 431 | |
| 2020 | FEED Vict Racing | 5 | Chevy | ITA; 16* | ITA; 2 | ZOL; 4 | ZOL; 19 | MOS | MOS | VAL | VAL | ESP | ESP | | | | 21st | 104 | |
| 2021 | Academy Motorsport | 5 | EuroNASCAR FJ 2020 | ESP; 7 | ESP; 9 | GBR | GBR | CZE; 11 | CZE; 4 | CRO; 3 | CRO; 17 | BEL | BEL | ITA; 1* | **ITA**; 1* | | 9th | 331 | |

=== Other stock cars ===
==== Speedcar Series ====
(key)

Speedcar Series results
| Year | Team | 1 | 2 | 3 | 4 | 5 | 6 | 7 | 8 | 9 | Pos | Points |
|---|---|---|---|---|---|---|---|---|---|---|---|---|
| 2008 | Speedcar Team | SEN1 | SEN2 | SEP1 | SEP2 | BHR1; 6 | BHR2; Ret | DUB1; 9 | DUB2; Ret | | 14th | 3 |
| 2008–09 | Durango | DUB; 6 | BHR1; 10 | BHR2; Ret | LOS1; 5 | LOS2; Ret | DUB1 | DUB2 | BHR1 | BHR2 | 11th | 7 |

==== Stock Car Brasil ====
Stock Car Brasil results
| Year | Team | Car | 1 | 2 | 3 | 4 | 5 | 6 | 7 | 8 | 9 | 10 | 11 | 12 | 13 | 14 | 15 | 16 | 17 | 18 | 19 | 20 | 21 | Rank | Points |
|---|---|---|---|---|---|---|---|---|---|---|---|---|---|---|---|---|---|---|---|---|---|---|---|---|---|
| 2011 | Shell V-Power Racing | Peugeot 408 | CTB | INT | RBP | VEL | CGD | RIO | INT; 18 | SAL | SCZ | LON | BSB | VEL | | | | | | | | | | NC† | 0† |
| 2015 | Shell Racing | Chevrolet Sonic | GOI; 1; 21 | RBP; 1 | RBP; 2 | VEL; 1 | VEL; 2 | CUR; 1 | CUR; 2 | SCZ; 1 | SCZ; 2 | CUR; 1 | CUR; 2 | GOI; 1 | CAS; 1 | CAS; 2 | BRA; 1 | BRA; 2 | CUR; 1 | CUR; 2 | TAR; 1 | TAR; 2 | INT; 1 | NC† | 0† |

† Ineligible for championship points.

=== Touring cars ===
==== V8 Supercars ====
V8 Supercars results
| Year | Team | No. | Car | 1 | 2 | 3 | 4 | 5 | 6 | 7 | 8 | 9 | 10 | 11 | 12 | 13 | 14 | 15 | 16 | 17 | 18 | 19 | 20 | 21 | 22 | 23 | 24 | 25 | 26 | 27 | 28 | 29 | 30 | 31 | Final pos | Points | Ref |
|---|---|---|---|---|---|---|---|---|---|---|---|---|---|---|---|---|---|---|---|---|---|---|---|---|---|---|---|---|---|---|---|---|---|---|---|---|---|
| 2010 | Rod Nash Racing | 55 | Ford FG Falcon | YMC; R1 | YMC; R2 | BHR; R3 | BHR; R4 | ADE; R5 | ADE; R6 | HAM; R7 | HAM; R8 | QLD; R9 | QLD; R10 | WIN; R11 | WIN; R12 | HDV; R13 | HDV; R14 | TOW; R15 | TOW; R16 | PHI; Q | PHI; R17 | BAT; R18 | SUR; R19; 22 | SUR; R20; 5 | SYM; R21 | SYM; R22 | SAN; R23 | SAN; R24 | SYD; R25 | SYD; R26 | | | | | NC | 0 † | |
| 2012 | Kelly Racing | 51 | Holden VE Commodore | ADE; R1 | ADE; R2 | SYM; R3 | SYM; R4 | HAM; R5 | HAM; R6 | BAR; R7 | BAR; R8 | BAR; R9 | PHI; R10 | PHI; R11 | HID; R12 | HID; R13 | TOW; R14; Ret | TOW; R15; 24 | QLD; R16; 24 | QLD; R17; 24 | SMP; R18; 24 | SMP; R19; 26 | SAN; Q | SAN; R20 | BAT; R21 | SUR; R22 | SUR; R23 | YMC; R24 | YMC; R25 | YMC; R26 | WIN; R27 | WIN; R28 | SYD; R29 | SYD; R30 | NC | 0 † | |

† Not Eligible for points

=== Complete FIA World Rallycross Championship results ===
Supercar results
| Year | Entrant | Car | 1 | 2 | 3 | 4 | 5 | 6 | 7 | 8 | 9 | 10 | 11 | 12 | WRX | Points |
|---|---|---|---|---|---|---|---|---|---|---|---|---|---|---|---|---|
| 2014 | Albatec Racing | Peugeot 208 GTi | POR; 17 | GBR | NOR; 14 | FIN; 16 | SWE; 17 | BEL; 14 | CAN; 16 | FRA | GER | ITA; 18 | TUR | ARG | 37th | 8 |

=== Complete Formula E results ===
(key) (Races in bold indicate pole position; races in italics indicate fastest lap)

Formula E results
| Year | Team | Chassis | Powertrain | 1 | 2 | 3 | 4 | 5 | 6 | 7 | 8 | 9 | 10 | Pos | Points |
|---|---|---|---|---|---|---|---|---|---|---|---|---|---|---|---|
| 2015–16 | Venturi Formula E Team | Spark SRT01-e | Venturi VM200-FE-01 | BEI; 14 | PUT; 11 | PDE; DNS | BUE | MEX | LBH | PAR | BER | LDN | LDN | 20th | 0 |

=== Complete FIA World Endurance Championship results ===
(key) (Races in bold indicate pole position; races in italics indicate fastest lap)

| Year | Entrant | Class | Chassis | Engine | 1 | 2 | 3 | 4 | 5 | 6 | 7 | Rank | Points |
|---|---|---|---|---|---|---|---|---|---|---|---|---|---|
| 2023 | Floyd Vanwall Racing Team | Hypercar | Vanwall Vandervell 680 | Gibson GL458 4.5 L V8 | SEB; 8 | ALG; Ret | SPA; Ret | LMS | MNZ | FUJ | BHR | 18th | 6 |

=== Complete Porsche Supercup results ===
(key) (Races in bold indicate pole position) (Races in italics indicate fastest lap)

| Year | Team | 1 | 2 | 3 | 4 | 5 | 6 | 7 | 8 | Pos. | Points |
|---|---|---|---|---|---|---|---|---|---|---|---|
| 2026 | Porsche Motorsport | MON | CAT; Ret | RBR; 24 | SPA; 24 | HUN; 19 | ZND; 27 | ZND; 26 | MNZ | NC† | 0† |

^{†} As Villeneuve was a guest driver, he was ineligible for points.

== Bibliography ==
- Hilton, Christopher (1996). Jacques Villeneuve: In His Own Words. Sparkford, England: Patrick Stephens Limited. ISBN 978-1-85260-557-5 – via Open Library.
- Villeneuve, Jacques; Donaldson, Gerald (1996). Villeneuve: My First Season in Formula One. London, England: CollinsWillow. ISBN 0-00-218766-3 – via Open Library.
- Walker, Murray (1996). Arron, Simon (ed.). Murray Walker's 1996 Grand Prix Year (PDF). Richmond, Surrey: Hazleton Publishing. ISBN 978-1-874557-17-3 – via Porsche Cars History.
- Collings, Timothy (1997). The New Villeneuve: A Life of Jacques Villeneuve. London, England: Motorbooks International. ISBN 0-7603-0411-4 – via Open Library.
- Downey, Michael, ed. (1998). 1998 Formula One Yearbook: Chronicle of the Grand Prix Year. London, England: Dorling Kindersley. ISBN 0-7894-3754-6 – via Open Library.
- Lecours, Pierre (1998). Gilles et Jacques: les Villeneuve et moi [Gilles and Jacques: the Villeneuves and me] (in French). Montreal, Quebec: Stanké Publishing. ISBN 978-2-7604-0635-3 – via Open Library.
- Edwards, Mike (1999). 1999 Formula One Yearbook: The Essential Guide to the Grand Prix Year. London, England: Dorling Kindersley. ISBN 0-7513-0802-1 – via Open Library.
- Sparling, Ken (1999). Champion Sport Biographies: Jacques Villeneuve. Toronto, Ontario: Warwick Publishing. ISBN 978-1-894020-57-2 – via Open Library.
- Domenjoz, Luc, ed. (2000). Formula 1 Yearbook 2000–2001. Bath, Somerset: Parragon. ISBN 0-75254-735-6 – via Open Library.
- Domenjoz, Luc, ed. (2001). Formula 1 Yearbook 2001–2002. Bath, Somerset: Parragon. ISBN 0-75256-639-3 – via Open Library.
- Mansell, Nigel, ed. (2001). The Official 2001–2002 Formula One Record Book. Holborn, London: European Press Ltd. ISBN 0-9541368-0-2 – via Open Library.
- Domenjoz, Luc, ed. (2002). Formula 1 Yearbook 2002–2003. Bath, Somerset: Parragon. ISBN 0-75259-146-0 – via Open Library.
- Domenjoz, Luc, ed. (2003). Formula 1 Yearbook 2003–2004. Bath, Somerset: Parragon. ISBN 1-40542-089-8 – via Open Library.
- Domenjoz, Luc, ed. (2004). Formula 1 Yearbook 2004–2005. Bath, Somerset: Parragon. ISBN 2-84707-072-9 – via Open Library.
- Jones, Bruce (2006). Grand Prix 2006. London, England: Carlton Books. ISBN 978-1-84442-341-5 – via Open Library.
- Sturm, Damion (2007). Booth, Douglas; Thorpe, Holly (eds.). Berkshire Encyclopedia of Extreme Sports. Great Barrington, Massachusetts: Berkshire Publishing Group. ISBN 978-0-9770159-5-5 – via Open Library.
- Camus, Martine (2007). La Saga Villeneuve: Une Dynastie Québécoise en F1 [The Villeneuve Saga: A Quebec Dynasty in F1] (in French). Montreal, Quebec: Les Éditions La Presse. ISBN 978-2-89430-820-2 – via Open Library.
- Collings, Timothy; Edworthy, Sarah (2011). The Daily Telegraph Formula One Years (Fifth ed.). Dubai, United Arab Emirates: Carlton Books. ISBN 978-1-84732-869-4 – via Open Library.
- Jones, Bruce (2015). World Formula 1 Records 2016 (Fifth ed.). London, England: SevenOaks. ISBN 978-1-78177-268-3.
- Button, Jenson (2017). Life to the Limit. London, England: Blink Publishing. ISBN 978-1-911600-34-3.
- Newey, Adrian (2017). How to Build a Car: The Autobiography of the World's Greatest Formula 1 Designer. London, England: HarperCollins Publishers. ISBN 978-0-00-819680-6.
- Hamilton, Maurice (2020). Formula One: The Champions: 70 years of legendary F1 drivers. London, England: White Lion Publishing. ISBN 978-1-78131-946-8 – via Google Books.

== Notes ==
Awards and achievements
| Preceded by Al Unser Jr. | Indianapolis 500 Winner; 1995 | Succeeded by Buddy Lazier |
| Preceded by Al Unser Jr. | PPG CART Indy Car World Series Champion; 1995 | Succeeded by Jimmy Vasser |
| Preceded by Damon Hill | Formula One World Champion; 1997 | Succeeded by Mika Häkkinen |
| Preceded by Nigel Mansell | Indianapolis 500 Rookie of the Year; 1994 | Succeeded by Christian Fittipaldi |
| Preceded by Nigel Mansell | Indy Car Rookie of the Year; 1994 | Succeeded by Gil de Ferran |
| Preceded by David Coulthard | Lorenzo Bandini Trophy; 1996 | Succeeded by Luca di Montezemolo |
| Preceded by Damon Hill | Hawthorn Memorial Trophy; 1997 | Succeeded by David Coulthard |
| Preceded by Damon Hill | Autosport International Racing Driver Award; 1997 | Succeeded by Mika Häkkinen |
Records
| Preceded by Juan Manuel Fangio and Giuseppe Farina; 3 wins (1950 season) | Most wins in first Formula One season 4 wins 1996, tied with: Lewis Hamilton (2007) | Succeeded by Co-Incumbent |
