= Area 27 Motorsports Park =

Motorsports club and racing circuit in British Columbia

- Location: Oliver, British Columbia, Canada
- Coordinates: 49.1557°N 119.5269°W
- Opened: 2016
- Architect: Jacques Villeneuve
- Length: 4.83 km (3.00 mi)
- Turns: 16

Area 27 Motorsports Park is a private motorsports club and racing circuit located near Oliver, in the South Okanagan region of British Columbia, Canada. Designed by 1997 Formula One World Champion Jacques Villeneuve, it is the first premier private membership track in Western Canada. The facility is named in honor of the legendary racing number of Gilles Villeneuve.

== History ==
The concept for Area 27 was originated in 2012 by Bill Drossos, a former professional racer who envisioned a "motorsports country club" taking advantage of the Okanagan's unique climate. The project was founded in 2013 by Drossos, Jacques Villeneuve, and David King, who formed the South Okanagan Motorsports Corporation (SOMC).

The facility is situated on land leased from the Osoyoos Indian Band (OIB) under a 99-year agreement. Groundbreaking occurred in early 2016, and paving of the 4.83 km (3.0 mi) circuit began in August of that year. Founding members and financial backers include Robbie Dickson, Les Cool, Daryl Carter, Gord Lindsay, Robert Sinneave, Paul Neider, Trevor Seibert and Brett Knelson. Following its inaugural season, the club announced that all 300 family memberships had been sold out.

== Circuit design and facilities ==
The 4.83 km (3.0 mi) circuit was designed by Villeneuve to incorporate classic Grand Prix elements while following the natural topography of the land.

- Main Circuit: Features 16 turns and over 350 feet of elevation change per lap. A notable feature is Turn 7 (The Carousel), which features 11 degrees of banking.
- Kartplex: A 1.21 km (0.75 mi) dedicated karting track with 20 corners, open to the public.
- Academy 27: A professional driving school offering instruction in a fleet provided through a partnership with General Motors. The fleet includes the Chevrolet Corvette and Cadillac V-Series Blackwing models.
- ZR2 Off-Road Academy: An all-terrain circuit used for high-performance truck training.

== In popular culture ==
In 2018, the circuit was featured in the Amazon Prime series The Grand Tour (Season 2, Episode 10). Hosts Jeremy Clarkson, Richard Hammond, and James May tested high-performance vehicles on the track.
