= 1995 Macau Grand Prix =

Formula Three motor race

Race details
Date	19 November 1995
Location	Guia Circuit, Macau
Course	Temporary street circuit 6.120 km (3.803 mi)
Distance	Leg 1; 15 laps, 73.44 km (45.63 mi); Leg 2 Canceled, 0 km (0 mi)
- Leg 1

Pole
Driver	(Italy) Massimiliano Angelelli	Bertram Schafer Racing
Time	2:19.151

Fastest Lap
Driver	(Germany) Ralf Schumacher	WTS Racing
Time	2:19.087

Podium
First	(Germany) Ralf Schumacher	WTS Racing
Second	(Italy) Jarno Trulli	KMS
Third	(Spain) Pedro de la Rosa	TOM'S
- Leg 2 (Canceled)

The 1995 Macau Grand Prix Formula Three was the 42nd Macau Grand Prix race to be held on the streets of Macau on 19 November 1995. It was the twelfth edition for Formula Three cars. Ralf Schumacher of WTS Racing, brother of 1990 winner Michael Schumacher, won the 15-lap race, which was shortened because of a fourteen-car accident at San Francisco Bend turn on the second leg's first lap that was caused by Norberto Fontana running wide and hitting the wall beside the track, sending him back into the path of other cars. Ralf Schumacher was the third German to win the race in the past three editions after Jörg Müller won the 1993 iteration and Sascha Maassen won the 1994 race. Jarno Trulli finished in second for KMS and TOM'S driver Pedro de la Rosa was third.

As of 2019, Schumacher is the last Macau GP winner to have won a Formula One race.

Future three-time Indianapolis 500 winner Hélio Castroneves also made a start in this event. His crash at Mandarin Bend in lap 3 of the resumed second leg leads the decision of cancellation of the second leg.

== Entry list ==
Team	No	Driver	Vehicle	Engine
(United Kingdom) Mobil 1 West Surrey Racing	1	(Germany) Sascha Maassen	Dallara 395	Mugen-Honda
(United Kingdom) Mobil 1 West Surrey Racing	2	(Brazil) Gualter Salles	Dallara 395	Mugen-Honda
(Switzerland) San Miguel KMS	3	(Argentina) Norberto Fontana	Dallara 395	Opel
(Switzerland) KMS	5	(Italy) Jarno Trulli	Dallara 395	Opel
(Italy) Auto Italia	6	(Italy) Luca Rangoni	Dallara 395	Fiat
(Japan) TOM'S	7	(Spain) Pedro de la Rosa	Dallara 395	Toyota
(Japan) TOM'S	8	(United Kingdom) Oliver Gavin	Dallara 395	Toyota
(United Kingdom) San Miguel Paul Stewart Racing	9	(Republic of Ireland) Ralph Firman	Dallara 395	Mugen-Honda
(United Kingdom) San Miguel Paul Stewart Racing	10	(Brazil) Hélio Castroneves	Dallara 395	Mugen-Honda
(Germany) Mild Seven WTS Racing	11	(Germany) Ralf Schumacher	Dallara 395	Opel
(Germany) Mild Seven WTS Racing	12	(Austria) Philipp Peter	Dallara 395	Opel
(United Kingdom) Alan Docking Racing	15	(United Kingdom) Warren Hughes	Dallara 395	Mitsubishi
(United Kingdom) Alan Docking Racing	16	(Uruguay) Gonzalo Rodríguez	Dallara 395	Mitsubishi
(United Kingdom) Alan Docking Racing	17	(Belgium) Kurt Mollekens	Dallara 395	Mugen-Honda
(Italy) Bojue Prema Powerteam	18	(Italy) Gianantonio Pacchioni	Dallara 395	Fiat
(Italy) Bojue Prema Powerteam	19	(Portugal) André Couto	Dallara 395	Fiat
(Germany) Bertram Schafer Racing	20	(Italy) Massimiliano Angelelli	Dallara 395	Opel
(Germany) Bertram Schafer Racing	21	(Netherlands) Tom Coronel	Dallara 395	Opel
(Italy) RC Motorsport	22	(Italy) Thomas Biagi	Dallara 395	Opel
(Italy) RC Motorsport	23	(Germany) Christian Abt	Dallara 395	Opel
(Austria) RSM Marko	26	(Portugal) Pedro Couceiro	Dallara 395	Fiat
(Austria) RSM Marko	27	(Germany) Arnd Meier	Dallara 395	Fiat
(Japan) The Next One	28	(Japan) Hiroki Katoh	Dallara 395	Mugen-Honda
(Japan) Team NMS	29	(Japan) Ryo Michigami	Dallara 395	Toyota
(Japan) Team NMS	30	(Japan) Yuji Tachikawa	Dallara 395	Toyota
Opel Team Japan	31	(Japan) Keiichi Nishimiya	Dallara 395	Opel
(Germany) G+M Escom Motorsport	32	(Austria) Alexander Wurz	Dallara 395	Opel
(Germany) G+M Escom Motorsport	33	(Finland) Toni Teittinen	Dallara 395	Opel
(United Kingdom) Fortec Motorsports	35	(United Kingdom) Jamie Davies	Dallara 395	Mugen-Honda
(United Kingdom) Fortec Motorsports	36	(France) Laurent Redon	Dallara 395	Mugen-Honda

=== Race ===
Pos.	No.	Driver	Team	Laps	Race Time
1	11	(Germany) Ralf Schumacher	WTS Racing	15	35:05.832
2	5	(Italy) Jarno Trulli	KMS	15	+6.323
3	7	(Spain) Pedro de la Rosa	TOM'S Racing Team	15	+6.637
4	1	(Germany) Sascha Maassen	West Surrey Racing	15	+8.788
5	3	(Argentina) Norberto Fontana	KMS	15	+24.073
6	19	(Portugal) André Couto	Prema Powerteam	15	+28.943
7	32	(Austria) Alexander Wurz	G+M Motorsport	15	+29.548
8	26	(Portugal) Pedro Couceiro	RSM Marko - Team Sical	15	+30.164
9	35	(United Kingdom) Jamie Davies	Fortec Motorsports	15	+30.625
10	22	(Italy) Thomas Biagi	RC Motorsport	15	+31.303
11	15	(United Kingdom) Warren Hughes	Alan Docking Racing	15	+35.480
12	16	(Uruguay) Gonzalo Rodríguez	Alan Docking Racing	15	+38.917
13	23	(Germany) Christian Abt	RC Motorsport	15	+51.071
14	2	(Brazil) Gualter Salles	West Surrey Racing	15	+57.933
15	17	(Belgium) Kurt Mollekens	Alan Docking Racing	15	+59.193
16	36	(France) Laurent Redon	Fortec Motorsports	15	+1:05.665
17	30	(Japan) Yuji Tachikawa	Team NMS	15	+1:06.061
18	33	(Finland) Toni Teittinen	G+M Motorsport	15	+1:09.263
19	31	(Japan) Keiichi Nishimiya	Tomei Sport Opel Team Japan	15	+1:09.718
20	29	(Japan) Ryo Michigami	Team NMS	15	+1:09.988
DNF	6	(Italy) Luca Rangoni	Auto Italia / EF Project	12	-
DNF	20	(Italy) Massimiliano Angelelli	Opel Team BSR	10	-
DNF	28	(Japan) Hiroki Katoh	The Next One	10	-
DNF	18	(Italy) Gianantonio Pacchioni	Prema Powerteam	9	-
DNF	10	(Brazil) Hélio Castroneves	Paul Stewart Racing	9	-
DNF	8	(United Kingdom) Oliver Gavin	TOM'S Racing Team	8	-
DNF	27	(Germany) Arnd Meier	RSM Marko - AMC Diepholz	6	-
DNF	9	(Republic of Ireland) Ralph Firman	Paul Stewart Racing	6	-
DNF	12	(Austria) Philipp Peter	WTS Racing	-	-
DNF	21	(Netherlands) Tom Coronel	Opel Team BSR	-	-
