= 1993 Macau Grand Prix =

Formula Three motor race

Race details
Date	22 November 1993
Location	Guia Circuit, Macau
Course	Temporary street circuit 6.120 km (3.803 mi)
Distance	Leg 1; 15 laps, 73.44 km (45.63 mi); Leg 2; 15 laps, 73.44 km (45.63 mi)
- Leg 1

Pole
Driver	(Germany) Jörg Müller	RSM Marko
Time	2:18.60

Fastest Lap
Driver	(Germany) Jörg Müller	RSM Marko
Time	2:18.20

Podium
First	(Germany) Jörg Müller	RSM Marko
Second	(Germany) Sascha Maassen	Paul Stewart Racing
Third	(Denmark) Tom Kristensen	TOM'S
- Leg 2

Pole
Driver	(Germany) Jörg Müller	RSM Marko

Fastest Lap
Driver	(Sweden) Rickard Rydell	Navi Connection
Time	2:17.40

Podium
First	(Germany) Jörg Müller	RSM Marko
Second	(Denmark) Tom Kristensen	TOM'S
Third	(United Kingdom) Kelvin Burt	Paul Stewart Racing

The 1993 Macau Grand Prix Formula Three was the 40th Macau Grand Prix race to be held on the streets of Macau on 22 November 1993. It was the tenth edition for Formula Three cars.

== Entry list ==
Team	No	Driver	Vehicle	Engine
(Japan) Navi Connection w/ TOM'S	1	(Sweden) Rickard Rydell	TOM'S 033F	Toyota
(Japan) TOM'S	2	(Denmark) Tom Kristensen	TOM'S 033F	Toyota
(Japan) Now Motor Sports w/ TOM'S	3	(Japan) Hidetoshi Mitsusada	TOM'S 033F	Toyota
(Germany) WTS Motorsport	5	(Italy) Massimiliano Angelelli	Dallara 393	Opel
(Germany) WTS Motorsport	6	(United Kingdom) Gareth Rees	Dallara 393	Opel
(United Kingdom) Paul Stewart Racing	7	(United Kingdom) Kelvin Burt	Dallara 393	Mugen-Honda
(United Kingdom) Paul Stewart Racing	8	(Germany) Sascha Maassen	Dallara 393	Mugen-Honda
(Italy) Supercars CM	9	(Italy) Christian Pescatori	Dallara 393	Opel
(Italy) Supercars CM	10	(Austria) Philipp Peter	Dallara 393	Opel
(Italy) RC Motorsport	11	(Italy) Roberto Colciago	Dallara 393	Opel
(Italy) RC Motorsport	12	(Brazil) Gualter Salles	Dallara 393	Opel
(Italy) RC Motorsport	23	(Italy) Giancarlo Fisichella	Dallara 393	Opel
(France) Promatecme	15	(France) Christophe Tinseau	Dallara 393	Opel
(Japan) Tomei Sport	16	(United Kingdom) Anthony Reid	Dallara 393	Opel
(United Kingdom) Edenbridge Racing	17	(United Kingdom) Oliver Gavin	Dallara 393	Opel
(Germany) GM Motorsport	18	(Germany) Michael Krumm	Dallara 393	
(Germany) GM Motorsport	19	(Germany) Markus Liesner	Dallara 393	
(United Kingdom) Mobil 1 West Surrey Racing	20	(Belgium) Marc Goossens	Dallara 393	Mugen-Honda
(United Kingdom) Mobil 1 West Surrey Racing	21	(Spain) Pedro de la Rosa	Dallara 393	Mugen-Honda
(Italy) Coloni Motorsport	25	(Italy) Paolo Coloni	Dallara 393	Fiat
(Germany) Abt Sportsline	26	(Germany) Christian Abt	Dallara 393	Opel
(United Kingdom) March Racing	27	(United Kingdom) Warren Hughes	Ralt 93C	Toyota
(United Kingdom) March Racing	33	(Canada) Jacques Villeneuve	Ralt 93C	Toyota
(United Kingdom) Alan Docking Racing	28	(Brazil) Ricardo Rosset	Dallara 393	Mugen-Honda
(United Kingdom) Alan Docking Racing	29	(Monaco) Stéphane Ortelli	Dallara 393	Mugen-Honda
(Austria) RSM Marko	30	(Germany) Jörg Müller	Dallara 393	Fiat
(Austria) RSM Marko	31	(Germany) Magnus Wallinder	Dallara 393	Fiat
(United Kingdom) Fortec Motorsports	32	(Brazil) André Ribeiro	Dallara 393	Mugen-Honda
(United Kingdom) TOM's UK	35	(Italy) Alessandro Zampedri	TOM'S 033F	Toyota
(Switzerland) KMS	36	(Switzerland) Ruedi Schurter	Dallara 393	Opel

=== Race ===
Pos.	No.	Driver	Team	Laps	Race Time
1	30	(Germany) Jörg Müller	RSM Marko	27	1:02:57.870
2	2	(Denmark) Tom Kristensen	Toyota Team TOM'S	27	+25.900
3	7	(United Kingdom) Kelvin Burt	Paul Stewart Racing	27	+32.440
4	11	(Italy) Roberto Colciago	RC Motorsport	27	+32.920
5	5	(Italy) Massimiliano Angelelli	WTS Motorsport	27	+41.720
6	18	(Germany) Michael Krumm	G+M Escom Motorsport	27	+51.550
7	8	(Germany) Sascha Maassen	Paul Stewart Racing	27	+52.900
8	17	(United Kingdom) Oliver Gavin	Edenbridge Racing	27	+1:30.380
9	19	(Germany) Markus Liesner	G+M Escom Motorsport	27	+1:38.710
10	15	(France) Christophe Tinseau	Team Promatecme	27	+1:44.390
11	33	(Germany) Christian Abt	Abt Sportsline	27	+1:44.410
12	28	(Brazil) Ricardo Rosset	Alan Docking Racing	27	+2:17.000
13	31	(Germany) Magnus Wallinder	RSM Marko	27	+2:21.010
14	16	(United Kingdom) Anthony Reid	Tomei Sport	25	+2 laps
DNF	23	(Italy) Giancarlo Fisichella	RC Motorsport	20	-
DNF	1	(Sweden) Rickard Rydell	Navi Connection Racing	20	-
DNF	12	(Brazil) Gualter Salles	RC Motorsport	19	-
DNF	6	(United Kingdom) Gareth Rees	WTS Motorsport	18	-
DNF	20	(Belgium) Marc Goossens	West Surrey Racing	16	-
DNF	21	(Spain) Pedro de la Rosa	West Surrey Racing	15	-
DNF	3	(Japan) Hidetoshi Mitsusada	Now Motor Sports	15	-
DNF	35	(Italy) Alessandro Zampedri	TOM'S GB	12	-
DNF	36	(Switzerland) Ruedi Schurter	Team KMS	7	-
DNF	9	(Italy) Christian Pescatori	Supercars CM	1	-
DNF	10	(Austria) Philipp Peter	Supercars CM	1	-
DNF	32	(Brazil) André Ribeiro	Fortec Motorsports	1	-
DNF	27	(United Kingdom) Warren Hughes	March Racing	1	-
DNF	26	(Canada) Jacques Villeneuve	March Racing	-	-
DNF	29	(Monaco) Stéphane Ortelli	Alan Docking Racing	-	-
