= Toyota TF105 =

Formula One car for the 2005 Formula One season

Toyota TF105 Toyota TF105B
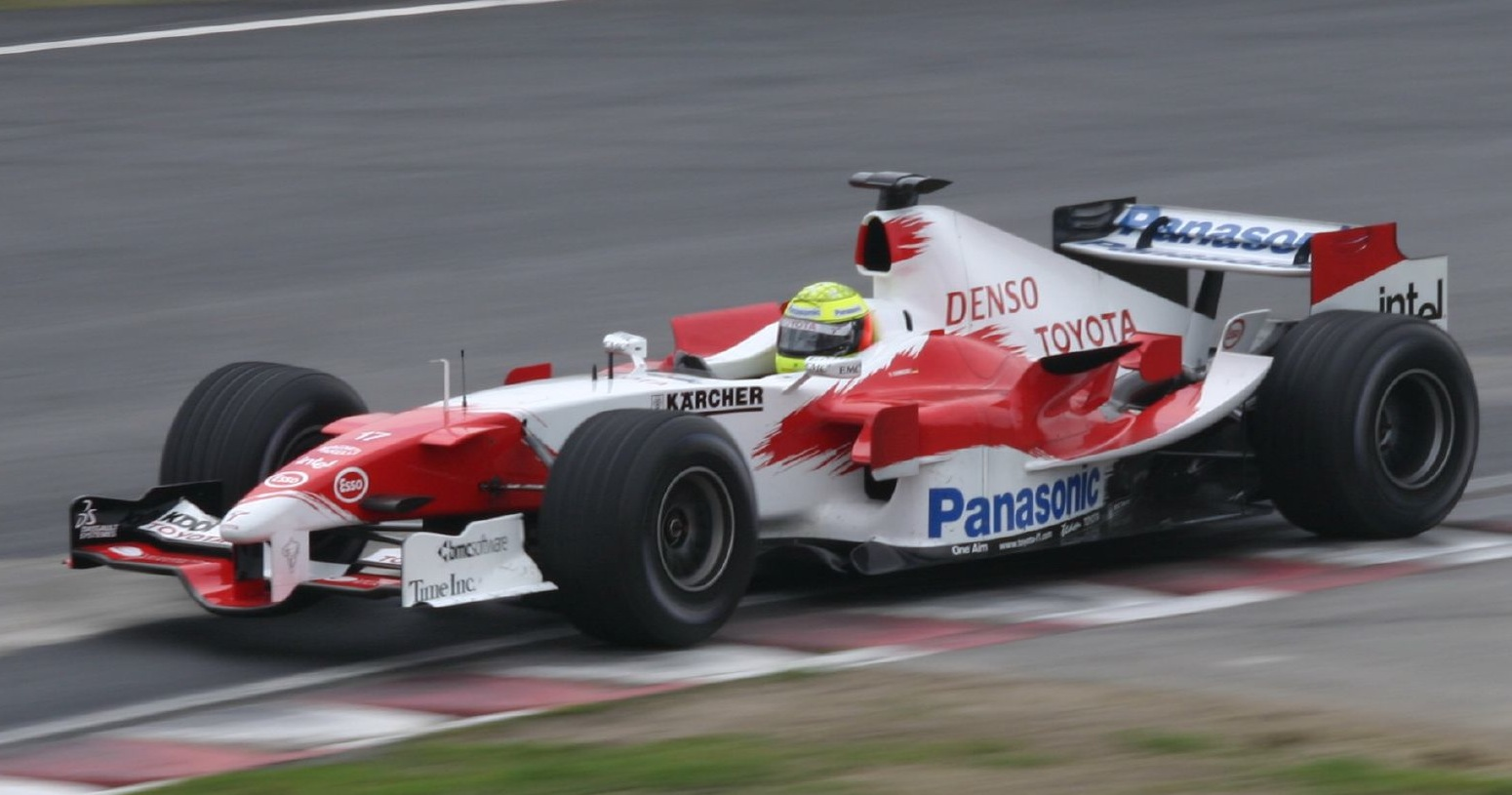
- Ralf Schumacher driving the TF105 at the 2005 Canadian Grand Prix
- Category: Formula One
- Constructor: Toyota
- Designers: Mike Gascoyne (Technical Director); Gustav Brunner (Chief Designer); Paul White (Deputy Chief Designer); Olivier Hulot (Head of Electronics); Nicolò Petrucci (Head of Aerodynamics); Luca Marmorini (Engine Director); Hiroshi Yajima (Chief Designer, Engine)
- Predecessor: TF104
- Successor: TF106

Technical specifications
- Chassis: carbon-fibre and honeycomb composite monocoque
- Engine: Toyota RVX-05 3.0-litre V10
- Transmission: Toyota-Xtrac 7-speed + 1 reverse sequential semi-automatic
- Power: 940 hp @ 19,000 rpm
- Fuel: Esso
- Tyres: Michelin

Competition history
- Notable entrants: Panasonic Toyota Racing
- Notable drivers: 16. (Italy) Jarno Trulli; 17. (Germany) Ralf Schumacher; 17. (Brazil) Ricardo Zonta
- Debut: 2005 Australian Grand Prix
- Last event: 2005 Chinese Grand Prix
Races	Wins	Podiums	Poles	F/Laps
19	0	5	2	1
- Constructors' Championships: 0
- Drivers' Championships: 0

The Toyota TF105 was the car with which the Toyota team competed in the 2005 Formula One World Championship.

This would become Toyota's best Formula 1 competitor in their history.

== Development ==
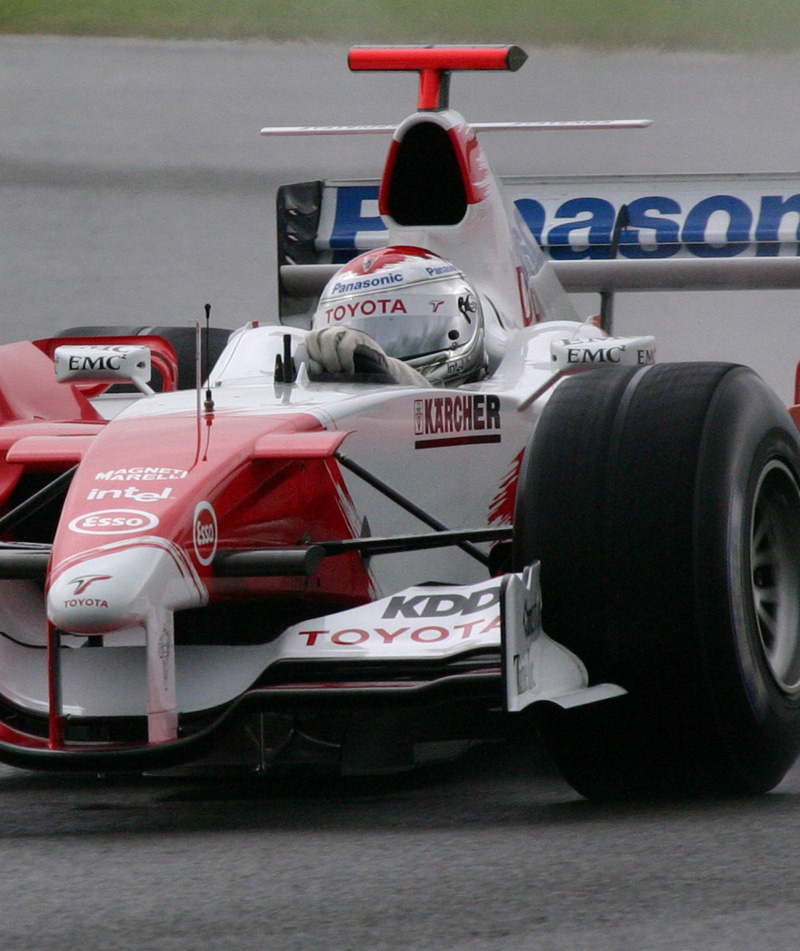
Jarno Trulli in the TF105.

Work began on the design and manufacture of the TF105 shortly before the end of the 2004 season, as work had to be done on the engine to make sure that it would safely endure two race meetings, which was a requirement in the FIA regulations for 2005. Many elements of the car were entirely new. The car's design was supervised by Technical Director Mike Gascoyne, and the chassis was designed by Gustav Brunner with the engine being designed by Luca Marmorini.

== Racing history ==
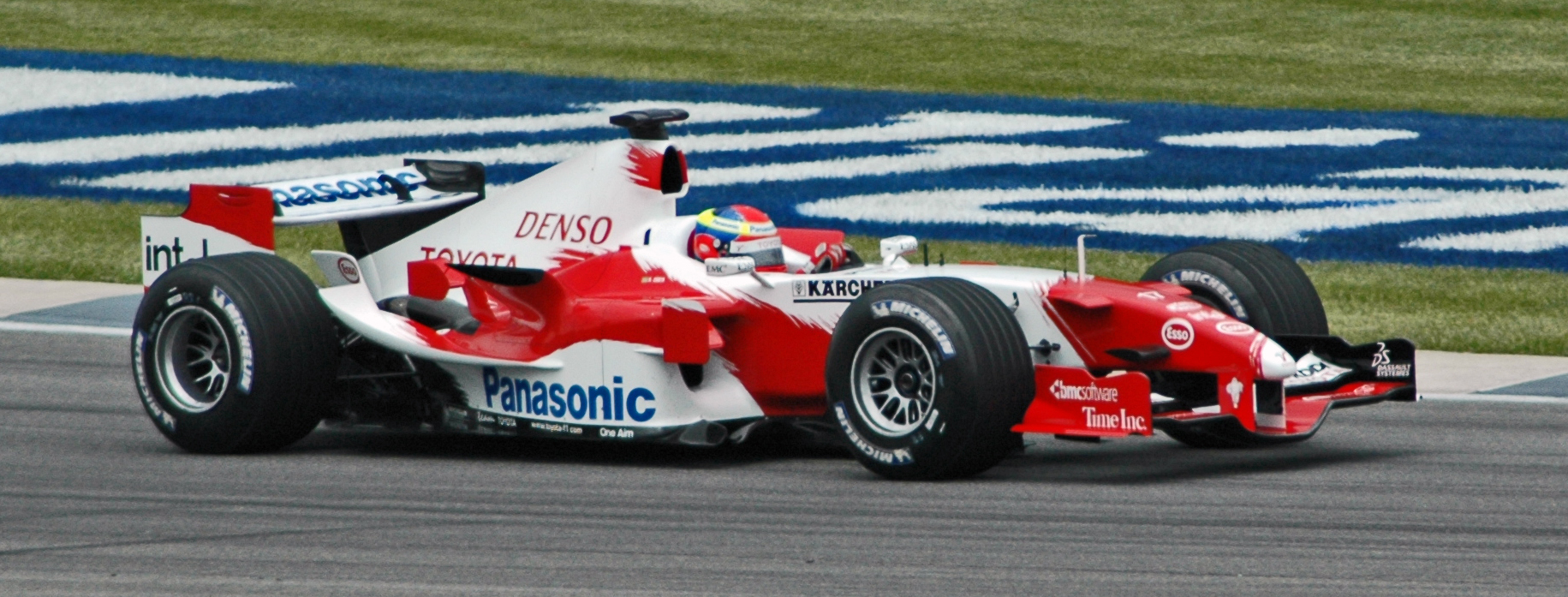
Ricardo Zonta driving the TF105 at the 2005 United States Grand Prix.

The season started very promisingly, with Trulli finishing second in the second and third races in Malaysia and Bahrain, respectively, giving the Japanese team their first podium finishes in the world championship. It's worth noting that in the first three races, Trulli started from second place twice and third place once. After three races, Trulli and Toyota were second in their respective world championship standings, behind Fernando Alonso and Renault.

The rest of the year was less positive in terms of results. Trulli scored another podium finish in Spain and took Toyota's first pole position in the controversial Indianapolis Grand Prix. Following an accident in Friday practice involving Ralf Schumacher due to a tire failure, the German driver was ruled out of the race, replaced by third driver Ricardo Zonta. The accident raised doubts about whether the Michelin tires would finish the race. Concerned that it was a manufacturing defect, Michelin asked its teams not to participate in the race or, in any case, to modify their car settings. As a result, both Toyotas were forced to retire after the formation lap, and Trulli was unable to take advantage of his pole position. Furthermore, the United States race and the first race in Australia were the only ones in which neither Toyota TF105 scored points.

Ralf Schumacher then took third place in Hungary and the fastest lap in the Belgian Grand Prix, a first for the team.

Toyota's form shocked many in the F1 paddock, as the Toyota team claimed two second-place finishes in a row and 27 points in the first three races of the season. The car was driven to 88 points with the team, with 5 podium positions also being scored. The team eventually finished fourth in the Constructors' Championship, their best ever championship placing.

At the Malaysian GP, Trulli did not spray his champagne on the podium out of respect for his good friend, air rescue pilot Stefano Bandini, who died on Saturday while fighting a forest fire when his plane hit power lines.

== TF105B ==
Toyota developed a B version of its TF105, intended to be entered from the Italian Grand Prix onwards, but problems encountered during development testing caused Toyota to delay the arrival of the TF105B, which only arrived at Japanese for the penultimate Grand Prix of the season. It was unique as it ran without a keel, and the suspension was mounted higher on the car than the TF105. It seemed to particularly suit Ralf Schumacher, as on its first outing, Ralf took pole at Suzuka, helped by his knowledge of the track from his Formula Nippon days. The TF105B was led to points finishes twice by Ralf Schumacher, with 7 points in total being scored with the car, including a podium in the 2005 Chinese Grand Prix.

== TF105.5 ==
During the 2005 season, Toyota designed the RVX-06 V8 engine, which was used on the Toyota TF106 the following season. In order to test this new engine, the TF105 chassis was adapted to accommodate the V8 engine. The TF105.5 was driven by the team's test driver, Frenchman Olivier Panis who stated that the new V8 engine was 2.5 seconds slower than the V10 engine used by Toyota in 2005.

== Previous indoor speed record ==
A TF105 set the previously nonexistent indoor speed record on an episode of Top Gear during the eighth series. With the ExCeL Exhibition Centre empty, The Stig (this was actually Jarno Trulli wearing the Stig's signature helmet as Toyota would not let a non Toyota driver drive the car) set a record of 81 miles per hour (130 km/h), due to the lack of grip on the polished floor and the limited distance. The speed has since been broken by the American Top Gear host Tanner Foust with his Ford Fiesta Rallycross.

== Complete Formula One results ==
(key) (results in bold indicate pole position, results in italics indicate fastest lap)

Year	Entrant	Chassis	Engine	Tyres	Drivers	1	2	3	4	5	6	7	8	9	10	11	12	13	14	15	16	17	18	19	Points	WCC
2005	Toyota	TF105	Toyota V10	MI		AUS	MAL	BHR	SMR	ESP	MON	EUR	CAN	USA	FRA	GBR	GER	HUN	TUR	ITA	BEL	BRA	JPN	CHN	88	4th
2005	Toyota	TF105	Toyota V10	MI	(Germany) Ralf Schumacher	12	5	4	9	4	6	Ret	6	PO	7	8	6	3	12	6	7	8			88	4th
2005	Toyota	TF105	Toyota V10	MI	(Italy) Jarno Trulli	9	2	2	5	3	10	8	Ret	**DNS**	5	9	14^{†}	4	6	5	Ret	13^{†}			88	4th
2005	Toyota	TF105	Toyota V10	MI	(Brazil) Ricardo Zonta									DNS											88	4th
2005	Toyota	TF105B	Toyota V10	MI	(Germany) Ralf Schumacher																		**8**	3	88	4th
2005	Toyota	TF105B	Toyota V10	MI	(Italy) Jarno Trulli																		Ret	15	88	4th
