= 1994 Macau Grand Prix =

Formula Three motor race

Race details
Date	20 November 1994
Location	Guia Circuit, Macau
Course	Temporary street circuit 6.120 km (3.803 mi)
Distance	Leg 1; 15 laps, 73.44 km (45.63 mi); Leg 2; 15 laps, 73.44 km (45.63 mi)
- Leg 1

Pole
Driver	(Germany) Sascha Maassen	WTS Racing
Time	2:19.00

Fastest Lap
Driver	(Italy) Giancarlo Fisichella	RC Motorsport
Time	2:19.17

Podium
First	(Italy) Giancarlo Fisichella	RC Motorsport
Second	(Germany) Sascha Maassen	WTS Racing
Third	(United Kingdom) Kelvin Burt	West Surrey Racing
- Leg 2

Pole
Driver	(Italy) Giancarlo Fisichella	RC Motorsport

Fastest Lap
Driver	(Brazil) Gualter Salles	Fortec Motorsports
Time	2:18.52

Podium
First	(Denmark) Jan Magnussen	Paul Stewart Racing
Second	(Germany) Sascha Maassen	WTS Racing
Third	(United Kingdom) Kelvin Burt	West Surrey Racing
- Overall Results
First	(Germany) Sascha Maassen	WTS Racing
Second	(United Kingdom) Kelvin Burt	West Surrey Racing
Third	(Denmark) Jan Magnussen	Paul Stewart Racing

The 1994 Macau Grand Prix Formula Three was the 41st Macau Grand Prix race to be held on the streets of Macau on 20 November 1994. It was the eleventh edition for Formula Three cars.

== Entry list ==
Team	No	Driver	Vehicle	Engine
(Austria) RSM Marko	1	(Germany) Jörg Müller	Dallara 394	Fiat
(Austria) RSM Marko	2	(Portugal) Pedro Couceiro	Dallara 394	Fiat
(Japan) TOM'S	3	(Germany) Michael Krumm	TOM'S 034F	Toyota
(Japan) TOM'S	5	(Japan) Masami Kageyama	TOM'S 034F	Toyota
(United Kingdom) Mobil 1 Paul Stewart Racing	6	(Denmark) Jan Magnussen	Dallara 394	Mugen-Honda
(United Kingdom) Mobil 1 Paul Stewart Racing	7	(United Kingdom) Dario Franchitti	Dallara 394	Mugen-Honda
(United Kingdom) Mobil 1 West Surrey Racing	8	(United Kingdom) Kelvin Burt	Dallara 394	Mugen-Honda
(United Kingdom) Mobil 1 West Surrey Racing	9	(Belgium) Vincent Radermecker	Dallara 394	Mugen-Honda
(Italy) RC Motorsport	10	(Italy) Giancarlo Fisichella	Dallara 394	Opel
(Italy) RC Motorsport	11	(Italy) Roberto Colciago	Dallara 394	Opel
(Italy) Thomas Biagi	12	(Italy) Thomas Biagi	Dallara 394	Opel
(Germany) G+M Escom Motorsport	15	(Austria) Alexander Wurz	Dallara 394	Opel
(Germany) G+M Escom Motorsport	16	(Germany) Arnd Meier	Dallara 394	Opel
(Japan) Tomei Sport	17	(United Kingdom) Richard Dean	Dallara 394	Opel
(United Kingdom) Alan Docking Racing	18	(United Kingdom) Gareth Rees	Dallara 394	Mugen-Honda
(United Kingdom) Alan Docking Racing	20	(South Africa) Stephen Watson	Dallara 394	Mugen-Honda
(Germany) Mild Seven WTS Racing	22	(Germany) Ralf Schumacher	Dallara 394	Opel
(Germany) Mild Seven WTS Racing	23	(Germany) Sascha Maassen	Dallara 394	Opel
(United Kingdom) Team AJS	25	(Brazil) Ricardo Rosset	Dallara 394	Mugen-Honda
(United Kingdom) Fortec Motorsports	26	(Brazil) Gualter Salles	Dallara 394	Mugen-Honda
(Japan) Now Motor Sports	28	(Japan) Ryo Michigami	Dallara 394	Toyota
(Japan) Now Motor Sports	29	(Japan) Hidetoshi Mitsusada	Dallara 394	Toyota
(Switzerland) KMS	30	(Argentina) Norberto Fontana	Dallara 394	Opel
(Switzerland) KMS	37	(Switzerland) Ruedi Schurter	Dallara 394	Opel
(Germany) Elf Team Formel 3	32	(Austria) Philipp Peter	Dallara 394	Fiat
(United Kingdom) Dino Morelli	33	(United Kingdom) Dino Morelli	Dallara 394	Fiat
(Germany) Abt Sportsline	35	(Germany) Christian Abt	Dallara 394	Opel
(Germany) Volkswagen Motorsport	36	(Italy) Massimiliano Angelelli	Dallara 394	Volkswagen
(Switzerland) Jo Zeller Racing	39	(Switzerland) Jo Zeller	Dallara 394	Fiat

=== Race ===
Pos.	No.	Driver	Team	Laps	Race Time
1	23	(Germany) Sascha Maassen	WTS Racing	27	1:06:03.750
2	8	(United Kingdom) Kelvin Burt	West Surrey Racing	27	+3.300
3	6	(Denmark) Jan Magnussen	Paul Stewart Racing	27	+6.450
4	22	(Germany) Ralf Schumacher	WTS Racing	27	+15.580
5	3	(Germany) Michael Krumm	Toyota Team TOM'S	27	+15.930
6	7	(United Kingdom) Dario Franchitti	Paul Stewart Racing	27	+33.410
7	32	(Austria) Philipp Peter	Elf Team Formel 3	27	+35.870
8	25	(Brazil) Ricardo Rosset	Team AJS	27	+44.600
9	12	(Italy) Thomas Biagi	RC Motorsport	27	+57.660
10	16	(Germany) Arnd Meier	G+M Escom Motorsport	27	+57.660
11	33	(United Kingdom) Dino Morelli	P-1 Engineering	27	+1:35.370
12	39	(Switzerland) Jo Zeller	Jo Zeller Racing	27	+2:15.710
13	20	(South Africa) Stephen Watson	Alan Docking Racing	27	+2:19.040
14	1	(Germany) Jörg Müller	RSM Marko	26	+1 lap
15	15	(Austria) Alexander Wurz	G+M Escom Motorsport	26	+1 lap
DNF	29	(Japan) Hidetoshi Mitsusada	Now Motor Sports	22	+1:05.665
DNF	36	(Italy) Massimiliano Angelelli	Volkswagen Motorsport	22	+1:06.061
DNF	2	(Portugal) Pedro Couceiro	RSM Marko	18	+1:09.263
DNF	10	(Italy) Giancarlo Fisichella	RC Motorsport	17	+1:09.718
DNF	5	(Japan) Masami Kageyama	Toyota Team TOM'S	15	+1:09.988
DNF	37	(Switzerland) Ruedi Schurter	Team KMS	14	-
DNF	26	(Brazil) Gualter Salles	Fortec Motorsports	14	-
DNF	30	(Argentina) Norberto Fontana	Team KMS	12	-
DNF	28	(Japan) Ryo Michigami	Now Motor Sports	7	-
DNF	35	(Germany) Christian Abt	Abt Sportsline	7	-
DNF	9	(Belgium) Vincent Radermecker	West Surrey Racing	7	-
DNF	18	(United Kingdom) Gareth Rees	Alan Docking Racing	6	-
DNF	17	(United Kingdom) Richard Dean	Tomei Sport	4	-
