= Ralf Schumacher =

German racing driver (born 1975)

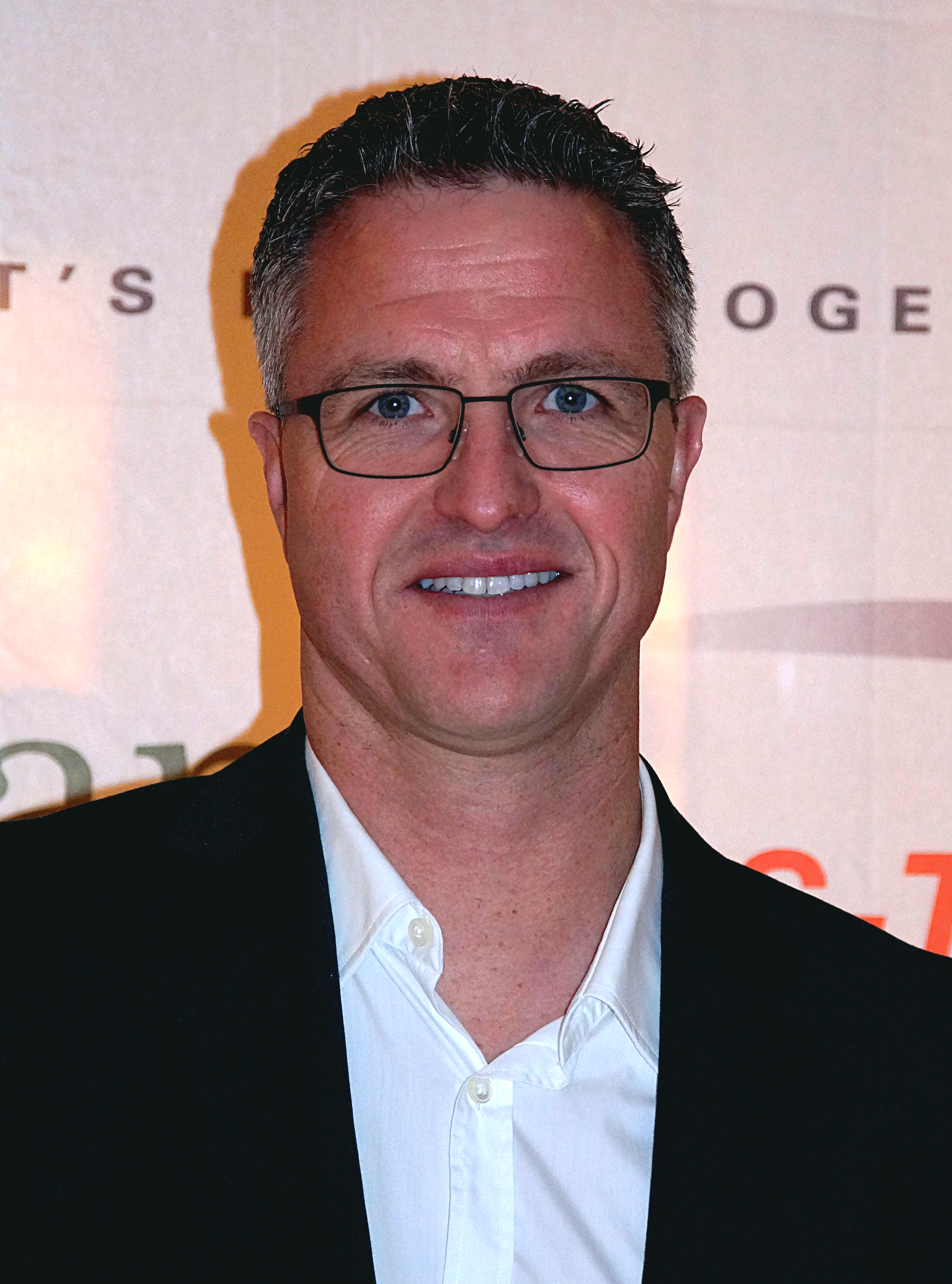
- Schumacher in 2016
- Born: 30 June 1975 (age 51); Hürth, North Rhine-Westphalia, West Germany
- Spouses: Cora Brinkmann (m. 2001; div. 2015); Étienne Bousquet-Cassagne (m. 2026)
- Children: David Schumacher
- Relatives: Michael Schumacher (brother); Corinna Schumacher (sister-in-law); Mick Schumacher (nephew); Gina-Maria Bethke (niece)

Formula One World Championship career
- Nationality: (Germany) German
- Active years: 1997–2007
- Team(s): Jordan, Williams, Toyota
- Entries: 182 (180 starts)
- Championships: 0
- Wins: 6
- Podiums: 27
- Career points: 329
- Pole positions: 6
- Fastest laps: 8
- First entry: 1997 Australian Grand Prix
- First win: 2001 San Marino Grand Prix
- Last win: 2003 French Grand Prix
- Last entry: 2007 Brazilian Grand Prix

Ralf Schumacher (born 30 June 1975) is a German former racing driver and broadcaster who competed in Formula One from 1997 to 2007. Schumacher won six Formula One Grands Prix across 11 seasons.

Born and raised in North Rhine-Westphalia, Schumacher is the younger brother of seven-time Formula One World Champion Michael Schumacher, and the pair remain the only siblings to each win a Formula One Grand Prix. Schumacher began karting at the age of three and achieved early success before making the transition to automobile racing in the German Formula Three Championship and the Formula Nippon series. He first drove in Formula One with Jordan Grand Prix for the 1997 season. Schumacher moved to the Williams team in 1999, finishing sixth in the Drivers' Championship that year. He won his first Grand Prix in 2001, en-route to fourth place in the Drivers' Championship, and subsequently won five more races over the course of two years.

Schumacher left Williams at the end of 2004 and joined Toyota Racing in 2005. His performance throughout 2006 and 2007 resulted in Schumacher leaving Formula One as a result of internal pressure. After leaving Formula One, Schumacher joined the Deutsche Tourenwagen Masters (DTM) in 2008, achieving minor success, and retired from motorsport at the end of 2012 to enter a managerial role within DTM, mentoring young drivers. He is now a co-commentator for Sky Sport in Germany.

== Early life and career ==
Schumacher was born in Hürth, North Rhine-Westphalia, West Germany, on 30 June 1975, the second son of Rolf Schumacher, a bricklayer, and his wife Elisabeth. Michael Schumacher is his elder brother. He began karting at the age of three driving on his parents' go-kart track in Kerpen. Schumacher's first major karting success came when he clinched the NRW Cup and the Gold Cup in 1991. In 1992, he won the German Junior Kart Championship. He then moved up into the senior series, finishing runner-up.

Aged 17, Schumacher moved into car racing, finishing runner-up in the ADAC Junior Formula Championship. This performance allowed Schumacher to test a Formula Three car during 1992, and later took part in a Formula Three event. His testing and one-off appearance in the series caught the attention of WTS Racing, allowing Schumacher to enter the German Formula Three Championship in 1994, where he finished third. He finished fourth and thirtieth in the Macau Grand Prix and the Masters of Formula 3, respectively.

Schumacher's performances in 1995 had improved over the previous year. Schumacher secured pole position and victory in the Macau Grand Prix and finished second in the Masters of Formula 3. In the German Formula Three series, Schumacher took three victories and finished second in the Championship behind Norberto Fontana. For 1996, Schumacher's manager Willi Weber secured him a seat in the Formula Nippon Series, driving for the Team Le Mans alongside experienced driver Naoki Hattori. Schumacher won the series on his first attempt, becoming the first rookie driver to clinch the championship. In the same year, Schumacher and Hattori entered the All Japan Grand Touring Car Championship, winning four races and taking the runner-up spot in the GT500 Championship behind the pairing of David Brabham and John Nielsen.

== Formula One career ==
=== Jordan (1997–1998) ===
==== 1997 ====
In August 1996, Schumacher tested for the McLaren team at Silverstone. In September, it was announced that Schumacher had signed a three-year contract to drive for the Jordan team. The deal also brought in a further £8 million from Schumacher's sponsor Bitburger brewery, with a small percentage going towards his salary. In January 1997, Giancarlo Fisichella was confirmed as Schumacher's teammate replacing Martin Brundle, who expressed a desire to remain with the team. Schumacher believed that Brundle's experience would have helped him in the coming season.

Schumacher took the first podium of his career in Argentina with third place despite a collision with teammate Fisichella. Further consecutive retirements followed in the next four races before picking up a sixth-place finish in France. Schumacher followed this result by picking up consecutive fifth-place finishes in the following three races. A further two retirements followed in the races in Belgium and Italy, before picking up a fifth-place finish in Austria. Schumacher did not score points in the final three races of the season, which included retirements in the Luxembourg Grand Prix and the European Grand Prix. In his debut 1997 season, Schumacher finished 11th in the Drivers' Championship, scoring 13 points.

Like all male German citizens, Schumacher was subject to compulsory military service in the German Armed Forces. Outside Formula One, Schumacher participated in the FIA GT Championship as a guest driver for the AMG Mercedes team at the Spa 4 Hours and was partnered by Klaus Ludwig. The pair finished fifth, scoring two points.

==== 1998 ====
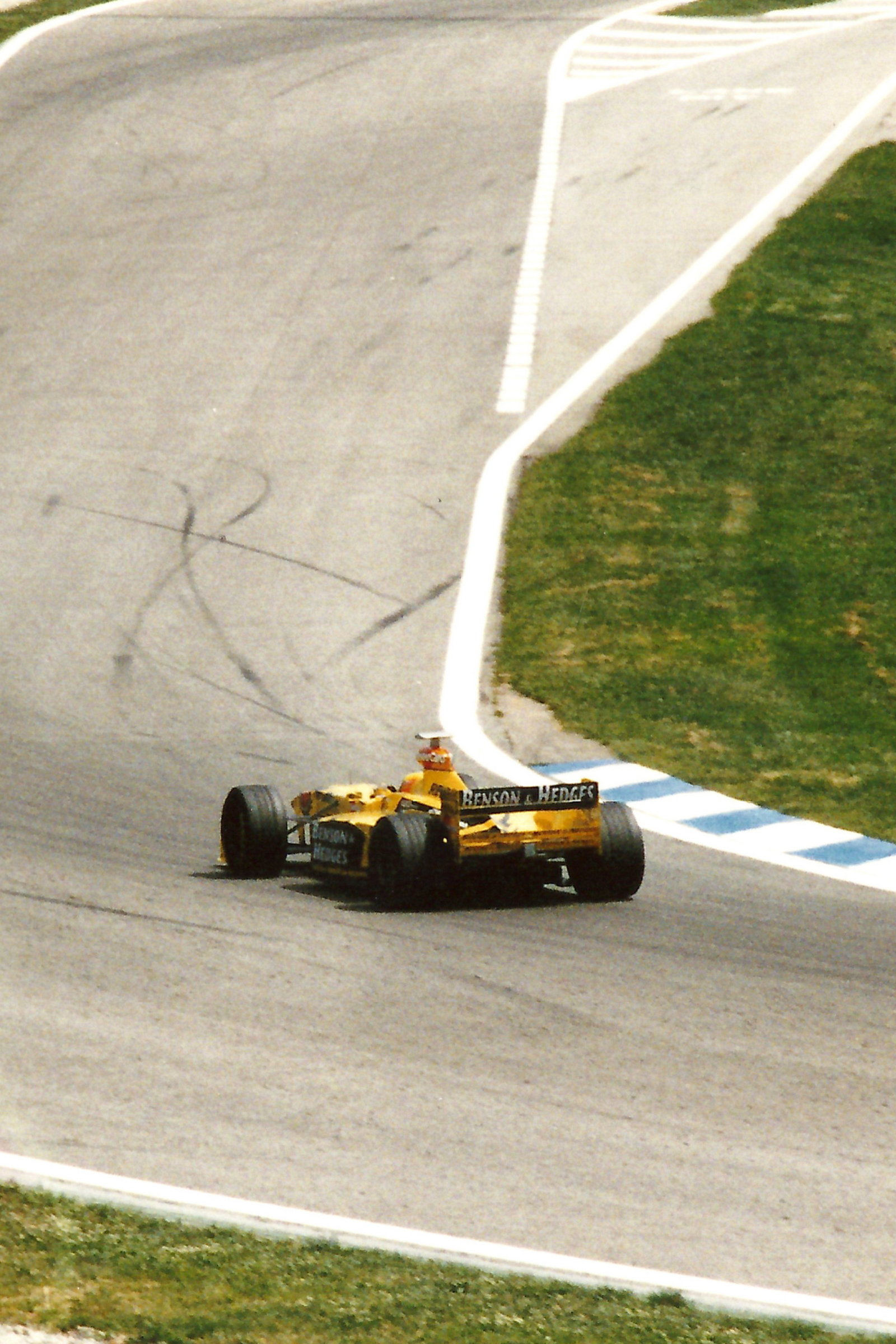
Schumacher at the 1998 Spanish Grand Prix

For 1998, Schumacher remained at Jordan and was partnered by 1996 Drivers' Champion Damon Hill. Schumacher endured a horrid start as he suffered from retirements in the first three races, and managed to finish in the races in San Marino and Spain, albeit outside the points scoring positions. Schumacher suffered from further consecutive retirements in the next two races, and managed to finish 16th in France. He took his and Jordan's first point of the season with a sixth-place finish at the British Grand Prix, before picking up further consecutive points finishes in the next two races.

Schumacher went on to secure second place in Belgium behind teammate Hill. Schumacher was issued with team orders to prevent him from overtaking Hill, which caused a strain in the relationship between Schumacher and Jordan. Schumacher managed to take his second consecutive podium with third place in Italy. After this race, it was announced that Schumacher signed a two-year contract to drive for the Williams team, alongside Alessandro Zanardi; with Williams partnering BMW from 2000 onwards, one of BMW's stipulations was to have a German driver in the team. Reportedly, this came after Michael Schumacher verbally declared to Eddie Jordan that his younger brother would never race for his team again and offering to buy him out of his contract with the team. According to Jordan himself 22 years later, Schumacher's elder brother actually paid the money of 2 million GBP to terminate his contract. He finished the season with consecutive retirements in the final two races, and clinched tenth place in the Drivers' Championship, with 14 points. He was replaced at Jordan for 1999 by Heinz-Harald Frentzen, who left Williams after two generally unsuccessful seasons.

=== Williams (1999–2004) ===
==== 1999 ====
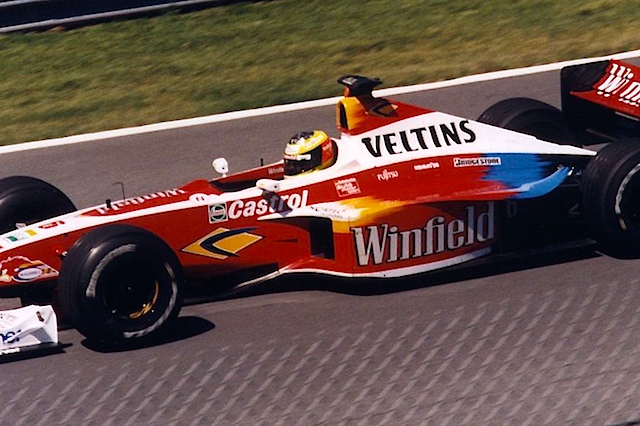
Schumacher driving for Williams in the 1999 Canadian Grand Prix

Schumacher began his season by finishing third in Australia, which was followed up with a fourth-place finish in Brazil. He suffered consecutive retirements in the next two races—he spun off in San Marino and suffered an accident in Monaco. Schumacher was able to take further points in the next two races in Spain, Canada, and France. Schumacher took a further podium position with third place in Britain but retired from the next race in Austria due to a spin. He took further points in the German Grand Prix, before taking a ninth-place finish in Hungary.

In Belgium, Schumacher took fifth place helped by a one-stop strategy earning him a better finish. In October, it was announced that Schumacher's contract was extended to a three-year deal worth $31 million. He rounded off the season with a fifth-place finish in Japan. Schumacher finished the 1999 season sixth in the Drivers' Championship, with 35 points.

==== 2000 ====
Schumacher continued to drive for Williams in 2000, and was partnered by rookie driver and future World Champion Jenson Button. His season started well as he managed to take third place in the opening race in Australia, and clinched fifth position in Brazil. He was forced to retire from the San Marino Grand Prix due to a fuel system issue but managed to clinch consecutive fourth-place finishes in the next two races. Schumacher was forced into another retirement as he was caught in a collision involving Eddie Irvine and Jos Verstappen at the European Grand Prix, and another retirement followed in Monaco due to a crash where he suffered from a 3-inch cut across his calf.

Schumacher was passed fit to participate in the Canadian Grand Prix, where he was classified 14th after being hit in the closing stages by BAR driver Jacques Villeneuve. Schumacher managed to take fifth place in France, before suffering a brake failure that forced him to retire in Austria. He managed to finish the next four races, which included consecutive third-place finishes in Belgium and Italy. Despite these results, he was unable to finish the final three races of the season. Schumacher finished fifth in the Drivers' Championship, with 24 points.

==== 2001: Maiden wins ====
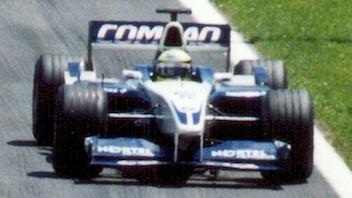
Schumacher driving for Williams at the 2001 Canadian Grand Prix, where he took his second career victory

At the opening round in Australia, Schumacher retired after a collision with BAR driver Jacques Villeneuve, which resulted in the death of race marshal Graham Beveridge. He scored his first points of the season with a fifth-place finish in Malaysia, and later spun off in the next race in Brazil, which included a collision with Barrichello early in the race. In the succeeding round at the San Marino Grand Prix, Schumacher started from third on the grid and led every lap of the race to take his first Formula One victory. The following three races saw Schumacher failing to finish.

Schumacher won his second career victory in Canadian Grand Prix, with his elder brother Michael Schumacher finishing second; the result marked the first one-two finish by siblings. These results were followed by a fourth-place finish at the European Grand Prix, and took second place in France. He was unable to finish the race in Britain due to a problem with his car's engine. In Germany, Schumacher took his third and final win of the season having started from second on the grid. This result marked a good run of form as Schumacher scored points in three of the remaining five races, including a third-place finish in Italy. Schumacher finished the 2001 season fourth in the Drivers' Championship, with 49 points.

==== 2002 ====
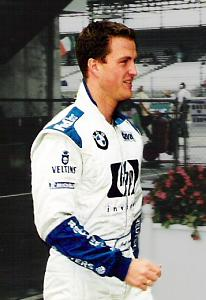
Schumacher in 2002

For 2002, Schumacher announced of his intention to wear glasses over the coming season to improve his vision. His decision was influenced after he was involved in a car crash on the Autobahn 3 when driving to visit his family. On 14 January, the Fédération Internationale de l'Automobile (FIA), Formula One's governing body, gave permission for Schumacher to wear glasses, and his helmet maker Schuberth developed padding with channels for the glass frames.

Schumacher's season started in Australia with a first lap accident where his car was launched into the air after colliding with Ferrari driver Rubens Barrichello. In the following race in Malaysia, he took his only victory of the season. He followed up the result by taking consecutive podiums in the next two races—a second place in Brazil, and a third-place finish in San Marino. At the Spanish Grand Prix, Schumacher ran wide on lap 29 while under pressure from teammate Montoya and eventually retired from an engine failure, although he was classified 11th. He managed to secure consecutive points finishes in the next two races, with a podium in Monaco. He followed these results by finishing in next eight races, which includes consecutive third-place finishes in Germany and Hungary. Schumacher rounded off the year with non-points finishes in the final three rounds which included a retirement in the United States. For the second consecutive season, Schumacher finished fourth in the Drivers' Championship, with 42 points.

==== 2003: Title Challenge ====
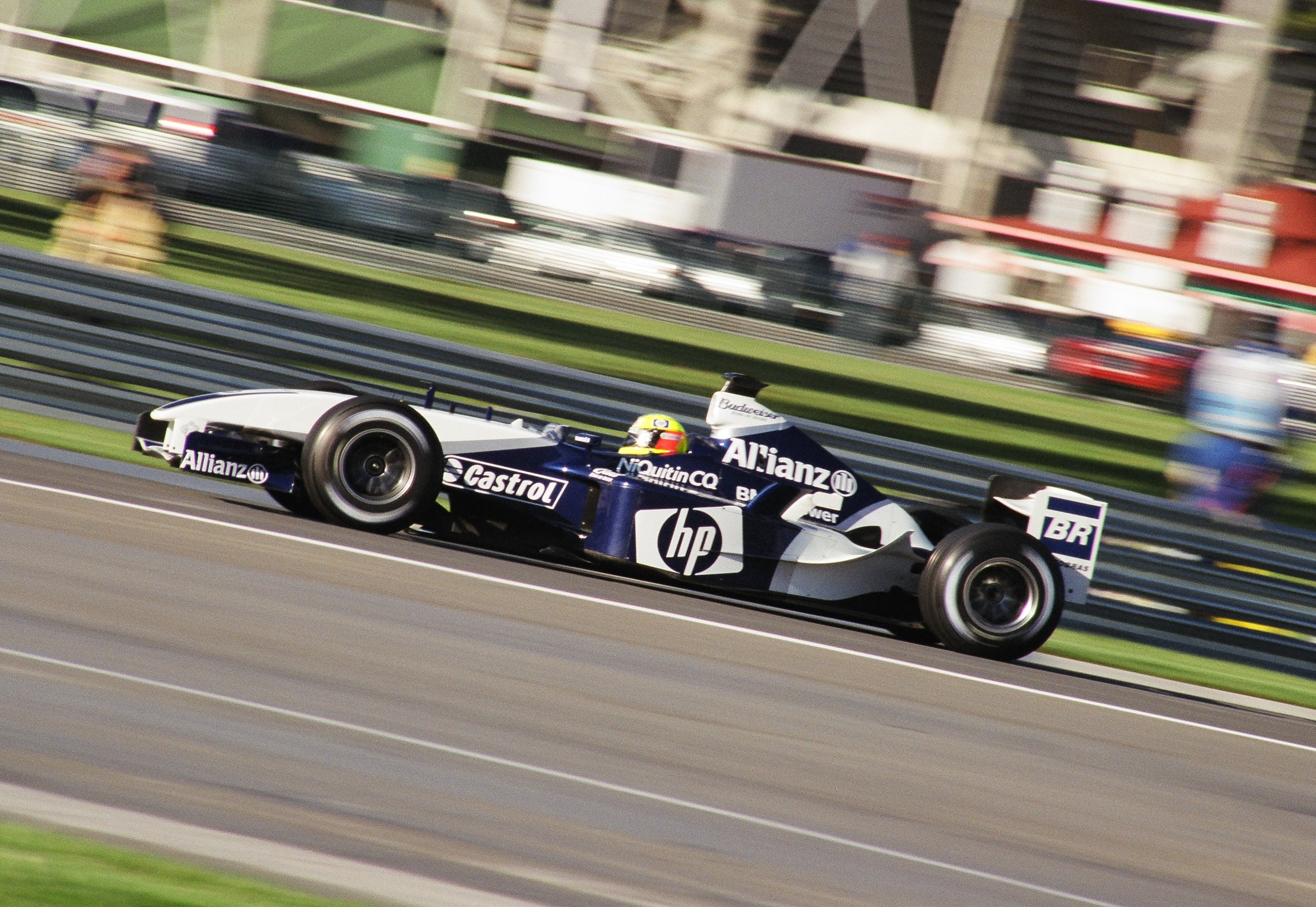
Schumacher driving for Williams at the 2003 United States Grand Prix

In 2003, Schumacher again competed with Williams alongside Montoya. He was unable to take part in winter testing in January, prior to the season because of reoccurring back pains, although he later returned in February. He endured a good first half of the season, and scored points in the opening seven races and clinched his first podium of the season with second place in Canada. Schumacher backed up the results by taking consecutive victories in the European and French Grands Prix. At the German Grand Prix, Schumacher retired on the first lap of the race after a collision with Rubens Barrichello and Kimi Räikkönen, for which he received a ten-place grid penalty for the next race. Williams successfully appealed against the decision and Schumacher managed to qualify second for the Hungarian Grand Prix, where he finished fourth.

At a test held at the Autodromo Nazionale Monza, Schumacher suffered a high-speed accident where he sustained a concussion. He was taken for a precautionary check at the circuit's medical centre before he was transferred to San Rafaele hospital. Although he had participated in the event's first qualifying session, Schumacher decided to withdraw and his place was taken by Williams test driver Marc Gené. He returned for the United States Grand Prix, where he retired having suffered an accident resulting from his car sliding on a wet track surface. At the season finale in Japan, Schumacher finished 12th despite spinning his car three times. He finished the season fifth in the Drivers' Championship, with 58 points, and helped Williams clinch second in the Constructors' Championship.

==== 2004: Final season at Williams ====
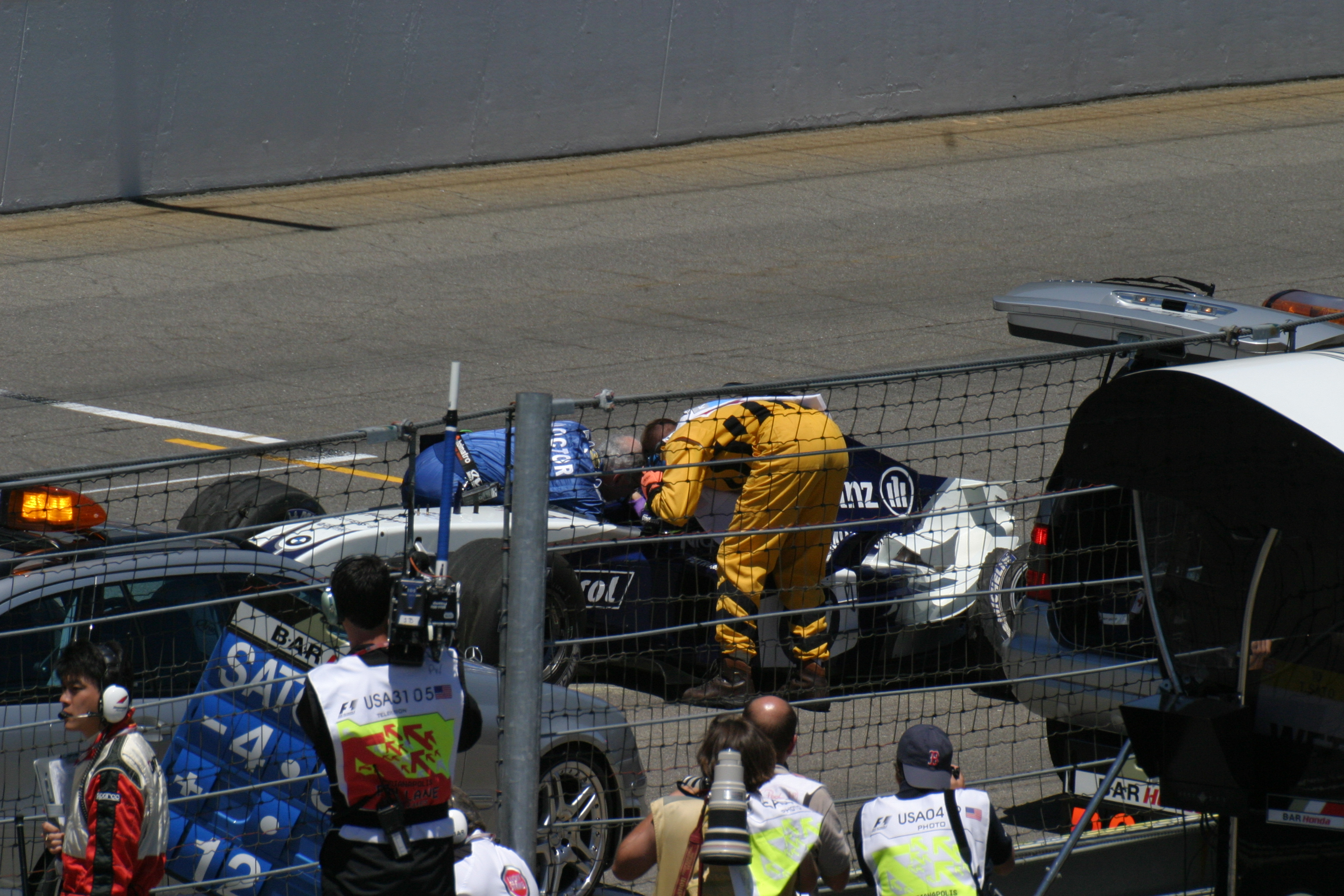
Schumacher after a serious accident at the 2004 United States Grand Prix

Schumacher remained at Williams for 2004 and continued to be partnered by Montoya. Schumacher was ambitious for the season, saying: "I can say that we'll come up with a car that will be competitive from the very first race of the new season." He made a good start to his season by finishing fourth in the opening round in Australia, although he retired from the next race in Malaysia from an engine failure. He managed to secure consecutive seventh-place finishes in the next two rounds, before finishing outside the points in Monaco. Schumacher was forced into retirement on the opening lap of the European Grand Prix due to a collision. At the Canadian Grand Prix, Schumacher qualified on pole position and went on to finish second in the race, but was later disqualified for irregularities on his car's brake ducts.

At the United States Grand Prix, Schumacher suffered serious injuries in an accident that occurred on the ninth lap of the race. The deceleration was measured at 78 g (765 m/s^{2}), resulting in a concussion as well as two minor fractures to his spinal column. Schumacher was forced to miss the next six races. As in 2003, Gené substituted for Schumacher for the races in France and Britain, with Antônio Pizzonia taking over the role for the next four races. In July, Schumacher signed a three-year contract with the Toyota team. Although he was passed fit for the Italian Grand Prix, Schumacher ultimately returned for the Chinese Grand Prix, where he retired from a puncture. Schumacher followed up the result by taking second place in Japan, and a fifth place at the final round in Brazil. He finished the season ninth in the Drivers' Championship, with 24 points.

=== Toyota (2005–2007) ===
==== 2005 ====
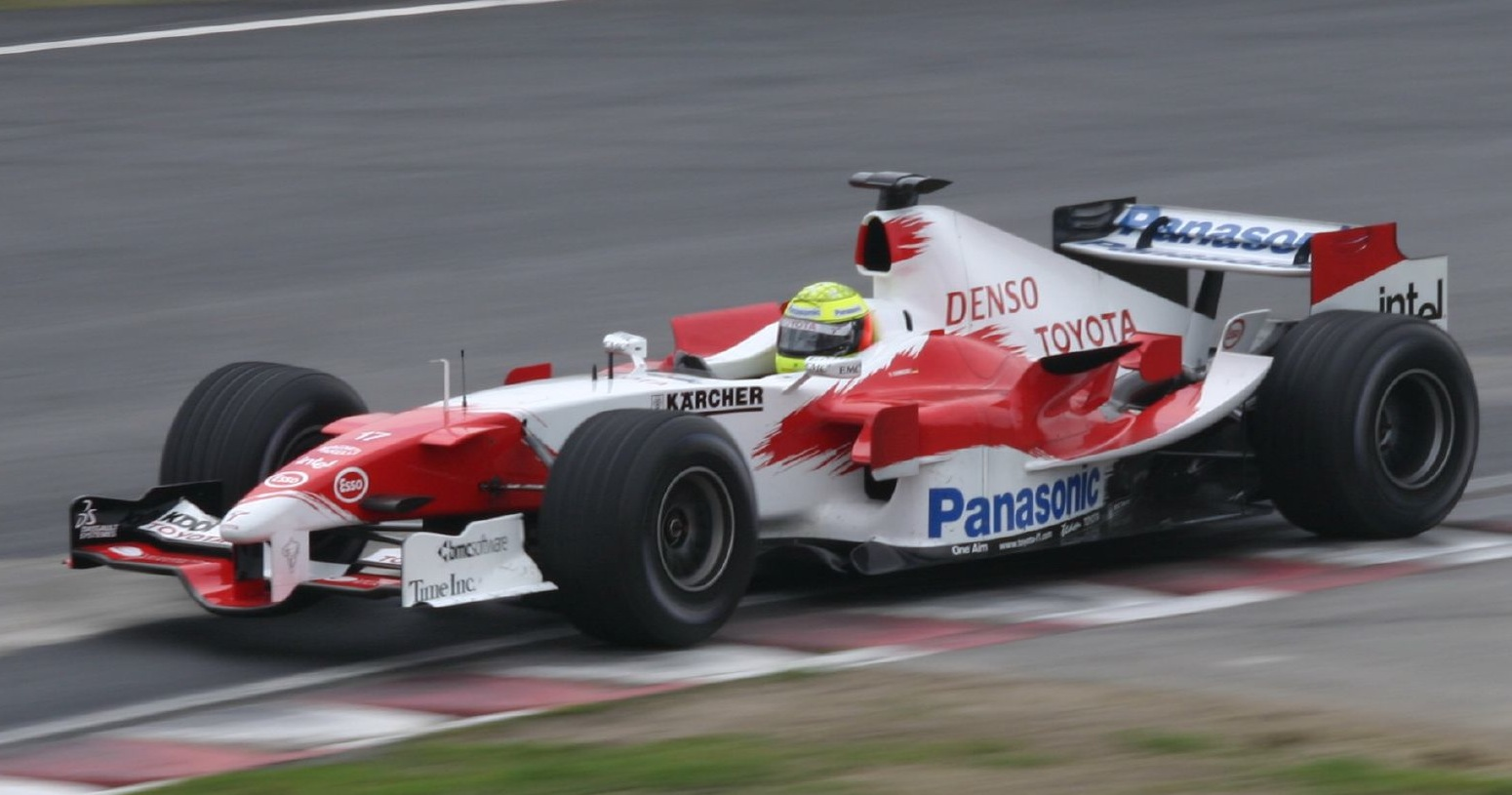
Schumacher driving for Toyota in the 2005 Canadian Grand Prix

For 2005, Schumacher was partnered by Jarno Trulli at Toyota and was hopeful about his prospects for the upcoming season. Schumacher secured his first two points scores of the season in Malaysia and Bahrain, and later finished outside the points in San Marino due to taking a 25-second penalty after finishing eighth due to causing an incident in his pitstops. Schumacher followed this up with consecutive points finishes in the next two races. He retired due to a spin during the European Grand Prix.

During the second practice session of the United States Grand Prix, Schumacher lost control of his car entering the final corner of the circuit, which resulted from a tyre failure. He was forced to miss the event and was replaced by Toyota test driver Ricardo Zonta. Schumacher returned for the French Grand Prix and began a run of four consecutive points scoring positions which included a podium finish in Hungary, and later finished outside the points in Turkey. This marked a turning point as Schumacher scored in all of the remaining races and took a podium position in the season finale in China. He finished the season sixth place in the Drivers' Championship, and helped Toyota clinch fourth in the Constructors' Championship.

==== 2006 ====
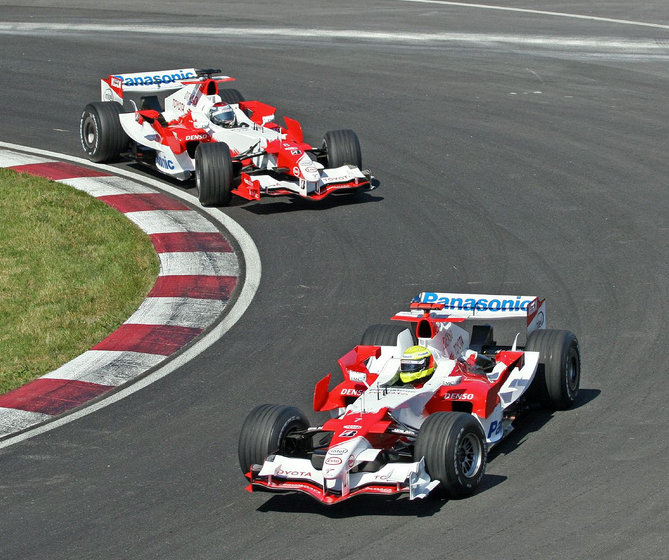
Schumacher (bottom) leads teammate Jarno Trulli in the 2006 Canadian Grand Prix.

Schumacher continued at Toyota and was again partnered by Trulli for 2006. He was ambitious for the upcoming season, saying: "We're looking to win some races. That's what our target should be and let's hope it's a realistic one." He started the season with a non-points finish in Bahrain as both Toyota cars were off the pace. Schumacher managed to score his and Toyota's first points of the season with eighth place in Malaysia. He managed to secure his and Toyota's only podium finish of the season in Australia.

Schumacher took ninth place in San Marino but suffered consecutive retirements in the next three races. He was able to finish the next five consecutive races, which included points scoring positions in France, Hungary, and Turkey. He was unable to finish the races in China and Brazil due to problems with his car's oil pressure and suspension, respectively. On 29 September, Schumacher was elected as the chairman of the Grand Prix Drivers Association (GPDA), the trade union of Formula One drivers. He finished the season tenth in the Drivers' Championship, and scored 20 points.

==== 2007: Final F1 season ====
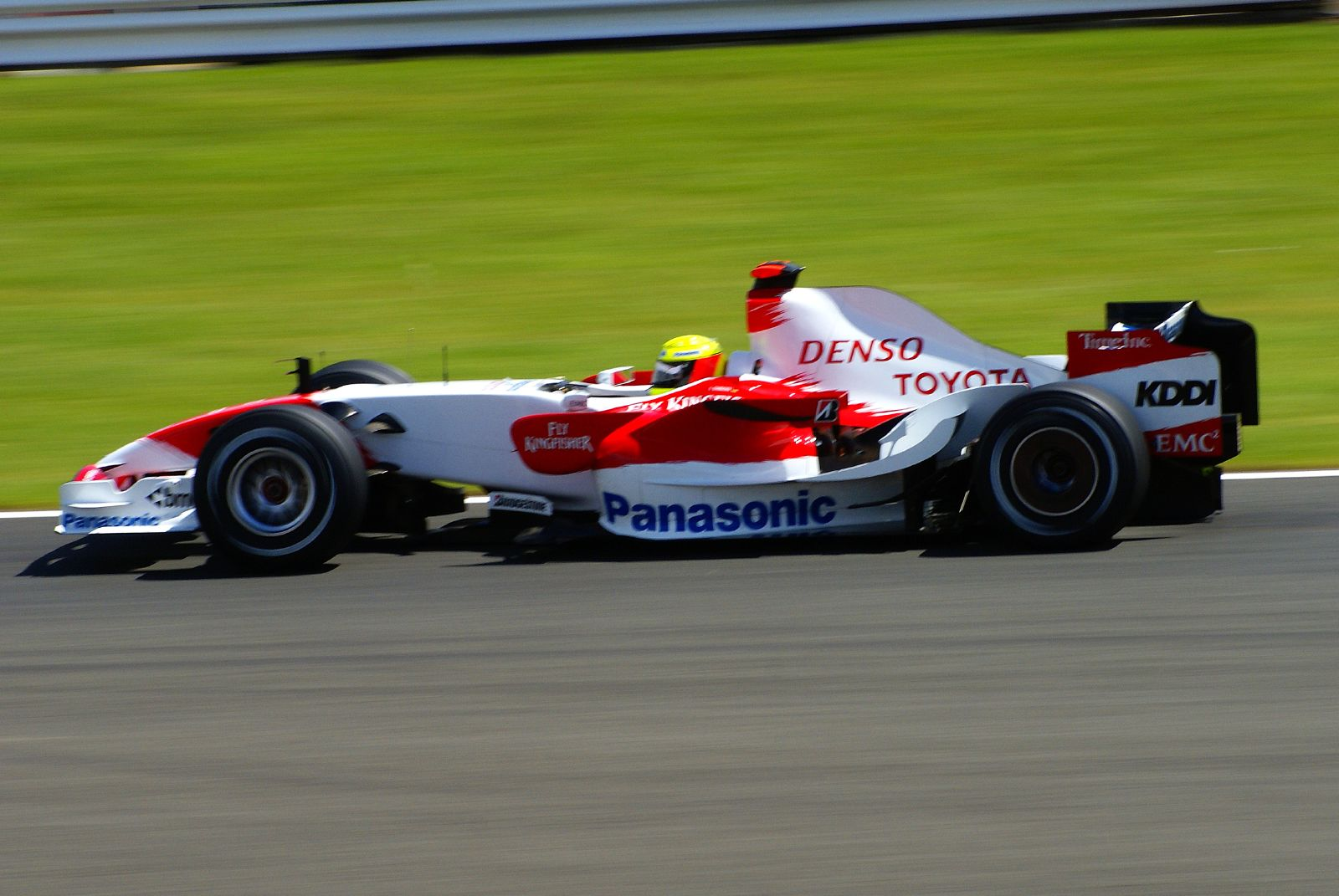
Schumacher driving for Toyota at the 2007 British Grand Prix

Schumacher remained at Toyota and continued to be partnered by Trulli for 2007. Despite Toyota's performances during 2006, Schumacher was optimistic for the upcoming season. Schumacher took eighth position at the opening round in Australia, and finished outside the points-scoring positions in the next two rounds. At the Spanish Grand Prix, he was involved in a collision with Williams driver Alexander Wurz and eventually retired with a mechanical issue. After finishing 16th at the Monaco Grand Prix, it was reported that Toyota were unhappy with his performances and faced pressure of possibly being replaced before the season concluded. Despite taking eighth place in Canada, Toyota Motorsport vice-chairman Tadashi Yamashina publicly urged Schumacher to improve his performances as he had qualified 18th for the race.

At the next Grand Prix in the United States, Schumacher spun off in the first corner and collided with the cars of David Coulthard and Rubens Barrichello. To ensure a greater chance of retaining his seat at Toyota, he offered to accept a $17 million pay cut. Schumacher did not finish the races at the British Grand Prix, and the European Grand Prix from a mechanical failure and a collision with BMW Sauber driver Nick Heidfeld, respectively. Schumacher later scored a further point for Toyota in Hungary, before taking consecutive finishes outside the points in the next three races. He was unable to finish the race in Japan having sustained a puncture. On 1 October, it was announced by Schumacher that he would leave Toyota at the end of the season. Schumacher spun off in the next race in China and secured an 11th-place finish in the season finale in Brazil. Schumacher ended his final season in Formula One 16th in the Drivers' Championship, with five points.

=== Attempted comebacks ===
Before and after his departure from Toyota, Schumacher was linked to several teams in Formula One. He held talks with long-time mentor and Toro Rosso team principal Franz Tost about a possible drive for the team, who ultimately opted to sign Sebastian Vettel and Sébastien Bourdais. Schumacher later approached McLaren to enquire about a seat that was vacated by Fernando Alonso; he was later turned down. Despite these setbacks, Schumacher remained certain that a Formula One seat would be available for 2008.

Schumacher's final participation in Formula One came at a test held for the newly formed Force India team in December 2007. This was a bid to secure a race seat alongside fellow German Adrian Sutil. During the test, Schumacher was the slowest driver, and later announced that he would not join the team for 2008, and that the possibility of participating in Formula One would be unlikely. After spending two seasons away from the sport, Schumacher's experience made him a target for the new teams US F1, Hispania (HRT), Virgin, and Lotus that entered the 2010 season, all of whom he rejected.

== Deutsche Tourenwagen Masters (2008–2012) ==
=== 2008 ===
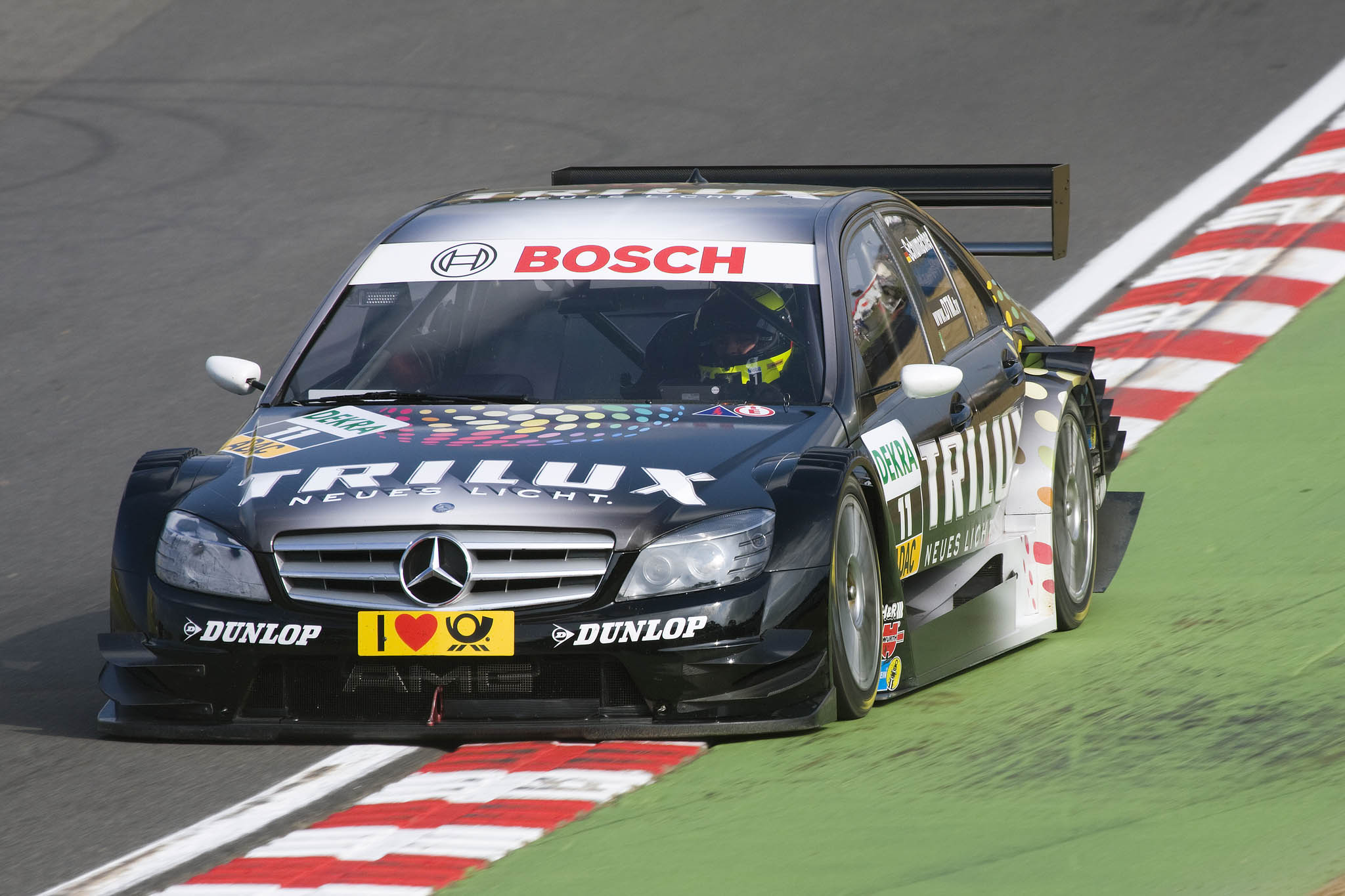
Schumacher driving for Mücke at the DTM round at Brands Hatch in 2008

On 18 February 2008, it was announced that Schumacher would be driving in the Deutsche Tourenwagen Masters (DTM) series in 2008, driving for Mücke Motorsport and was partnered by Maro Engel. Making his début at the Hockenheimring, Schumacher managed to finish 14th, which he followed up with a tenth-place finish at Oschersleben. He was forced into retirement at the next race at Lausitz, and managed to finish in the next three races he entered, albeit outside the points scoring positions. He secured his first points in the DTM series by finishing eighth at the Nürburgring.

He secured 15th place at the round held at Brands Hatch, before he backed the result up with a seventh-place finish at the Circuit de Catalunya. Schumacher rounded off the season with a retirement at the Bugatti Circuit and a 14th-place finish at the Hockenheimring. He finished the season 14th in the Drivers' Championship, with three points.

=== 2009 ===
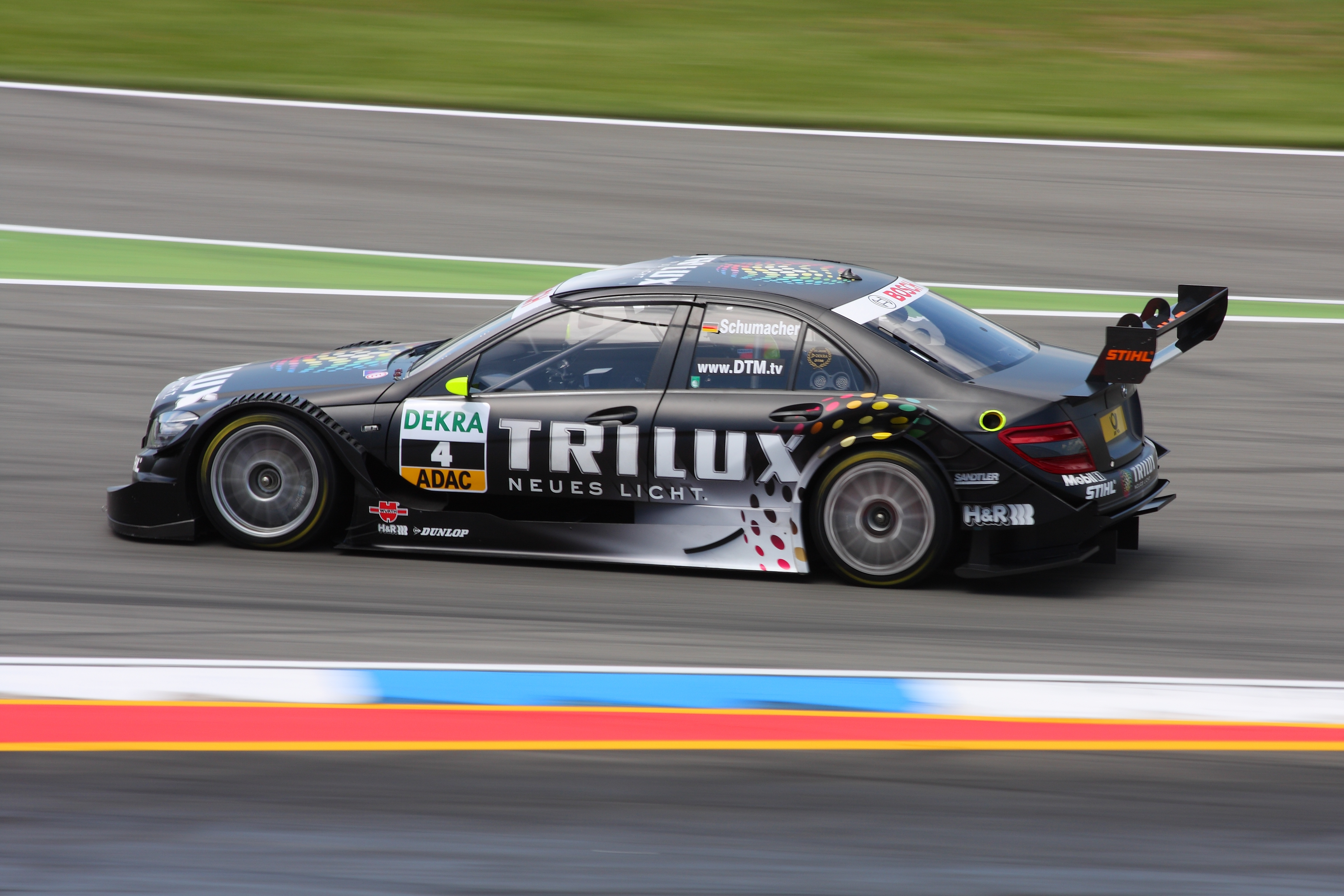
Schumacher driving for HWA at the Hockenheimring in 2009

For 2009, it was announced that Schumacher had extended his contract to drive for Mercedes-Benz and would move to the HWA Team, and was partnered by Paul di Resta, Bruno Spengler, and Gary Paffett. Schumacher managed to finish the first two races, although he did not finish in the points scoring positions. He secured his first points of the season with a sixth-place finish at the Norisring, which he followed up with tenth and 11th-place finishes in the races at Zandvoort and Oschersleben respectively.

Schumacher managed to secure his second point scoring position with a seventh place at the Nürburgring, and followed the result up by clinching consecutive finishes in the next two rounds at Brands Hatch and the Circuit de Catalunya. Schumacher took further points with a fifth-place finish at Dijon-Prenois and finished the season with a multi-car collision at the Hockenheimring. Schumacher finished the season 11th in the Drivers' Championship, and scored nine points.

=== 2010 ===
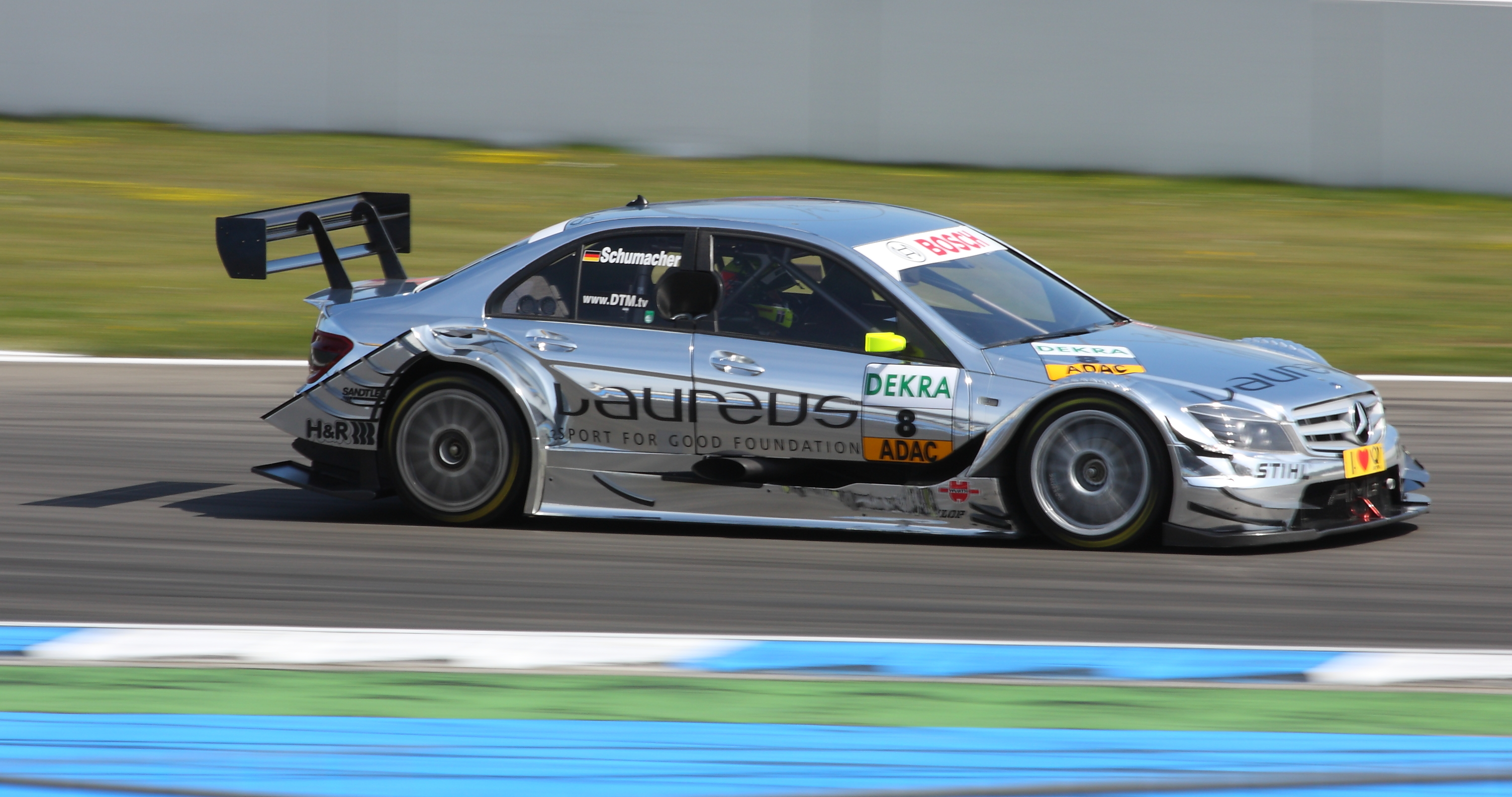
Schumacher driving for HWA at the Hockenheimring in 2010

On 23 March 2010, it was announced that Schumacher would be retained by HWA for 2010, and would be partnered by di Resta, Spengler and Gary Paffett. Schumacher's season started with a ninth-place finish at the Hockenheimring, before he was forced into retirement due to a failure in his car's electronic control in Valencia resulting in an misfire. Schumacher later secured finishes in the next two rounds, which he backed up with his first points of the season with sixth place at the Nürburgring.

This marked a turning point as Schumacher did not score points in the remaining six races. He suffered retirements in the races at Brands Hatch where he was involved in a collision and later suffered damage to his steering as a result of running off the race track His final retirement of 2010 came at the Hockenheimring where he was involved in another first lap collision. Schumacher finished the season 14th in the Drivers' Championship, scoring three points.

=== 2011 ===
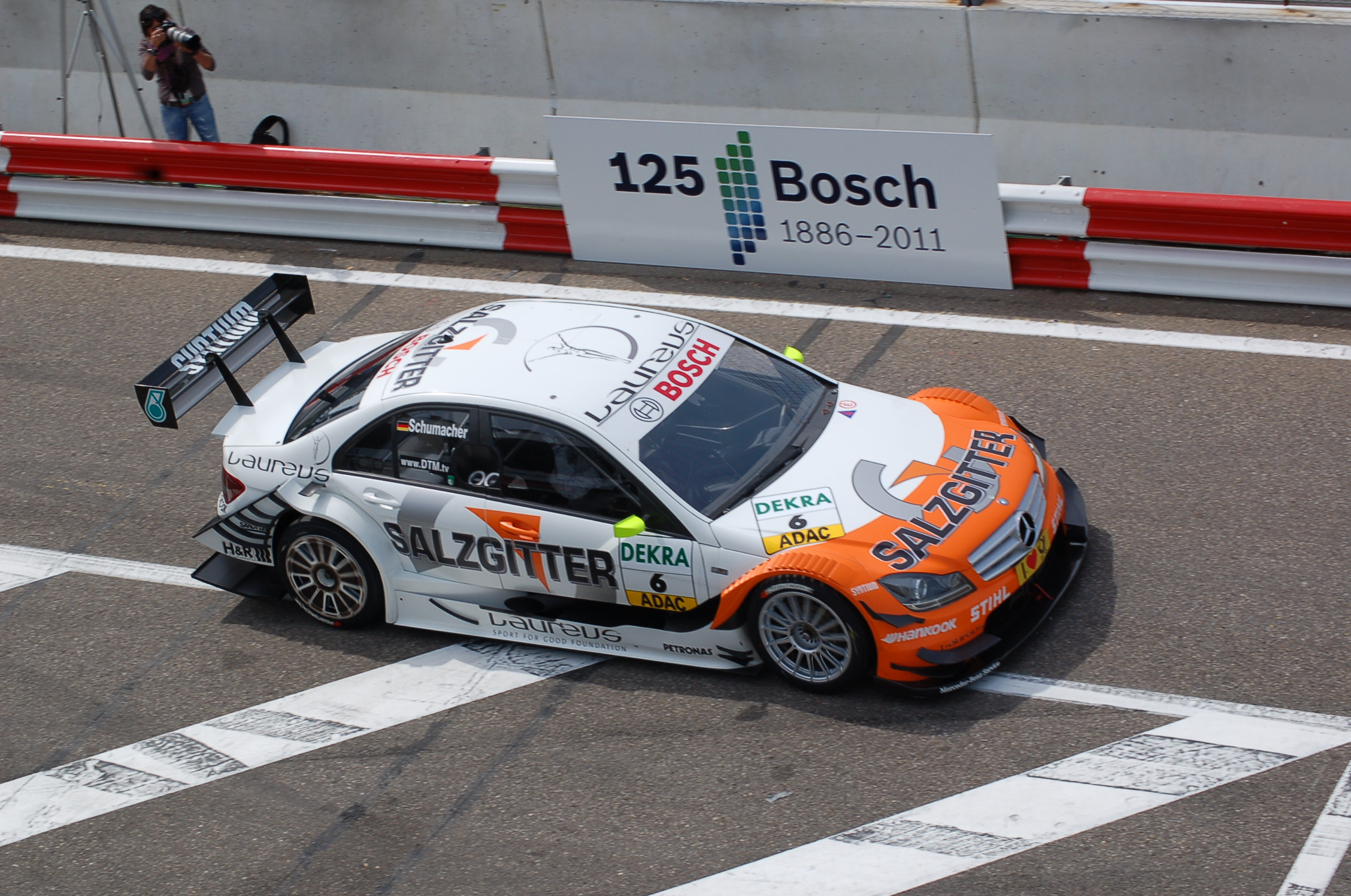
Schumacher competing in the 2011 DTM season

On 6 April 2011, it was confirmed that Schumacher would remain at HWA for 2011 and was partnered by Paffett, Spengler, and Jamie Green. Schumacher started off the season by taking his first two podiums in DTM with third place at the Hockenheimring and second at the Red Bull Ring, which remained his best result in DTM. Schumacher was unable to take further points in Lausitz but managed to clinch sixth place in Norisring. Despite the early successes of Schumacher in the first part of the season, he was able to only secure one further point scoring finish at Brands Hatch, and suffered retirements at the races held at the Nürburgring, where he collided with Mücke driver David Coulthard and received a suspended penalty, and Oscherleben, from a collision with Audi driver Filipe Albuquerque. Schumacher managed to finish the races in Valencia and at the Hockenheimring, albeit outside the point scoring positions. Schumacher finished the season eighth in the Drivers' Championship, scoring 21 points.

=== 2012 ===
On 20 October 2011, it was announced that Schumacher would remain at HWA for the 2012 season, and was once again partnered by Green and Paffett who were joined by new signing Christian Vietoris. Schumacher's season got off well as he clinched consecutive points scoring finishes in the first two races of the season, and managed to secure further finishes in the races held at Brands Hatch and the Red Bull Ring, although Schumacher did not finish in the points scoring positions. He was forced into retirement at the next race held at the Norisring due to an electrical failure while leading. This marked a turning point in Schumacher's season as he managed to finish the remaining five races of the season, including two points finishes in the races held at Zandvoort and the season finale at the Hockenheimring. Schumacher finished the season 17th in the Drivers' Championship, with ten points.

== Post-DTM career ==
Schumacher announced his retirement from active motorsport in March 2013 and would enter a management role at Mücke Motorsport, as well as becoming a shareholder in the team. In his role, he assists in the mentoring of young drivers signed with Mercedes-Benz. Schumacher had a guest role in an episode of the RTL television crime series Alarm for Cobra 11 – The Highway Police in 2015. He took over the running of the ADAC Formula 4 team HTP Junior Team Ungar with Mercedes DTM technical chief Gerhard Ungar from 2016; Schumacher had previously with Peter Mücke ran the Berlin-based RSC Mücke Motorsport team in the GP3 Series in 2010 and 2011.

In 2019, Schumacher became a pundit and co-commentator at Formula One races for the pay-TV channel Sky Deutschland. He made a one-off return to racing when he entered the Nürburgring round of the Prototype Cup Germany and shared a US Racing-fielded Ligier JS P320 LMP3 car with his son David in August 2024. The duo won the two races held that weekend.

== Personal life ==
In April 2001, Schumacher became engaged to Cora-Caroline Brinkmann, a former model; they were married on 5 October that year in a private civil ceremony at the couple's home in Hallwang, Austria. On 23 October 2001, their son David Schumacher was born three weeks premature. David also went on to become a racing driver.

On 20 February 2015, Schumacher's lawyer confirmed that Schumacher and his wife had divorced after an acrimonious period of separation. The couple fought a custody battle over their son, and Schumacher's estimated €100 million fortune, which was resolved with Cora receiving a €6 million settlement and the family home at Bergheim.

Schumacher was appointed a Laureus Ambassador at the Laureus World Sports Awards for the Laureus Foundation in 2011. He is a supporter of the Gut Aiderbichl animal sanctuary, situated near Salzburg. Animal rights activists accused Schumacher of hypocrisy as he has also engaged in animal hunting. People for the Ethical Treatment of Animals (PETA) criticized Schumacher in 2007 when he was accused of paying £35,000 to shoot three deer in a defined area.

On 14 July 2024, Schumacher announced on social media that he was in a same-sex relationship with his partner of two years, 34-year-old Étienne Bousquet-Cassagne. On 10 February 2026, he announced that they were engaged to be married.

== Racing record ==
=== Career summary ===
Season	Series	Team	Races	Poles	Wins	Points	Position
1992	Formula BMW Junior	?	10	?	?	66	6th
1993	Formula BMW Junior	?	?	?	?	?	**2nd**
1994	German Formula 3 Championship	Opel Team WTS	19	2	1	158	**3rd**
1994	Grand Prix de Monaco F3	Opel Team WTS	1	0	0	N/A	15th
1994	Macau Grand Prix	Mild Seven WTS Racing	1	0	0	N/A	4th
1994	Masters of Formula 3	WTS Motorsport	1	0	0	N/A	30th
1995	German Formula 3 Championship	Opel Team Weber-Trella Stuttgart Racing	15	2	3	171	**2nd**
1995	Macau Grand Prix	Mild Seven Opel Team WTS	1	1	1	N/A	**1st**
1995	Grand Prix de Monaco F3	Opel Team WTS	1	0	0	N/A	**2nd**
1995	Masters of Formula 3	WTS Motorsport	1	1	0	N/A	**2nd**
1996	Formula Nippon	X Japan Team LeMans	10	2	3	40	**1st**
1996	All-Japan GT Championship	Team Lark	6	4	3	60	**2nd**
1997	Formula One	Benson & Hedges Jordan Peugeot	17	0	0	13	11th
1997	FIA GT Championship	AMG Mercedes	1	0	0	2	29th
1998	Formula One	Benson & Hedges Jordan	16	0	0	14	10th
1999	Formula One	Winfield Williams F1 Team	16	0	0	35	6th
2000	Formula One	BMW Williams F1 Team	17	0	0	24	5th
2001	Formula One	BMW Williams F1 Team	17	1	3	49	4th
2002	Formula One	BMW Williams F1 Team	17	0	1	42	4th
2003	Formula One	BMW Williams F1 Team	15	3	2	58	5th
2004	Formula One	BMW Williams F1 Team	12	1	0	24	9th
2005	Formula One	Panasonic Toyota Racing	18	1	0	45	6th
2006	Formula One	Panasonic Toyota Racing	18	0	0	20	10th
2007	Formula One	Panasonic Toyota Racing	17	0	0	5	16th
2008	Deutsche Tourenwagen Masters	Mücke Motorsport	11	0	0	3	14th
2009	Deutsche Tourenwagen Masters	HWA Team	10	0	0	9	11th
2010	Deutsche Tourenwagen Masters	HWA Team	11	1	0	3	14th
2011	Deutsche Tourenwagen Masters	HWA Team	10	0	0	21	8th
2012	Deutsche Tourenwagen Masters	HWA Team	10	0	0	10	17th
2024	Prototype Cup Germany	US Racing	2	2	2	0	NC†

=== Complete German Formula Three results ===
(key) (Races in bold indicate pole position) (Races in italics indicate fastest lap)

Year	Entrant	Engine	Class	1	2	3	4	5	6	7	8	9	10	11	12	13	14	15	16	17	18	19	20	DC	Pts	Ref
1994	Opel Team WTS	Opel	A	ZOL; 1 C	ZOL; 2; 3	HOC; 1; 3	HOC; 2; 9	NÜR; 1 Ret	NÜR; 2; 8	WUN; 1; 2	WUN; 2 Ret	NOR; 1 Ret	NOR; 2; 10	DIE; 1; 2	DIE; 2; 2	NÜR; 1; 2	NÜR; 2; 3	AVU; 1; 2	AVU; 2; 14	ALE; 1; 1	**ALE**; **2**; 2	**HOC**; **1** DSQ	HOC; 2; 6	3rd	158	
1995	Opel Team WTS	Opel	A	HOC; 1; 2	HOC; 2; 2	AVU; 1; 5	AVU; 2; 6	NOR; 1; 1	**NOR**; **2**; 2	DIE; 1; 1	**DIE**; **2**; 1	NÜR; 1; 2	NÜR; 2; 3	ALE; 1; 3	ALE; 2; 3	MAG; 1; 10	MAG; 2 Ret	HOC; 1 DSQ	HOC; 2 DSQ					2nd	171	

=== Complete JGTC results ===
(key) (Races in bold indicate pole position) (Races in italics indicate fastest lap)

Year	Team	Car	Class	1	2	3	4	5	6	DC	Pts	Ref
1996	Team Lark	McLaren F1 GTR	GT500	**SUZ**; 1	**FUJ**; Ret	**SEN**; 15	FUJ; Ret	**SUG**; 1	**MIN**; 1	**2nd**	**60**	

=== Complete Formula Nippon results ===
(key) (Races in bold indicate pole position; races in italics indicate fastest lap)

Year	Entrant	1	2	3	4	5	6	7	8	9	10	DC	Points
1996	X Japan Racing Team LeMans	SUZ; 3	MIN; 1	**FUJ**; 19	TOK; 1	SUZ; 4	SUG; Ret	FUJ; Ret	MIN; 1	**SUZ**; 4	FUJ; Ret	**1st**	**40**

=== Complete Formula One results ===
(key) (Races in bold indicate pole position; races in italics indicate fastest lap)

Year	Entrant	Chassis	Engine	1	2	3	4	5	6	7	8	9	10	11	12	13	14	15	16	17	18	19	WDC	Points
1997	Benson & Hedges Total Jordan Peugeot	Jordan 197	Peugeot A14 3.0 V10	AUS; Ret	BRA; Ret	ARG; 3	SMR; Ret	MON; Ret	ESP; Ret	CAN; Ret	FRA; 6	GBR; 5	GER; 5	HUN; 5	BEL; Ret	ITA; Ret	AUT; 5	LUX; Ret	JPN; 9	EUR; Ret			11th	13
1998	Benson & Hedges Jordan	Jordan 198	Mugen-Honda MF-301 HC 3.0 V10	AUS; Ret	BRA; Ret	ARG; Ret	SMR; 7	ESP; 11	MON; Ret	CAN; Ret	FRA; 16	GBR; 6	AUT; 5	GER; 6	HUN; 9	BEL; 2	ITA; 3	LUX; Ret	JPN; Ret				10th	14
1999	Winfield Williams	Williams FW21	Supertec FB01 3.0 V10	AUS; 3	BRA; 4	SMR; Ret	MON; Ret	ESP; 5	CAN; 4	FRA; 4	GBR; 3	AUT; Ret	GER; 4	HUN; 9	BEL; 5	ITA; 2	EUR; 4	MAL; Ret	JPN; 5				6th	35
2000	BMW WilliamsF1 Team	Williams FW22	BMW E41 3.0 V10	AUS; 3	BRA; 5	SMR; Ret	GBR; 4	ESP; 4	EUR; Ret	MON; Ret	CAN; 14^{†}	FRA; 5	AUT; Ret	GER; 7	HUN; 5	BEL; 3	ITA; 3	USA; Ret	JPN; Ret	MAL; Ret			5th	24
2001	BMW WilliamsF1 Team	Williams FW23	BMW P80 3.0 V10	AUS; Ret	MAL; 5	BRA; Ret	SMR; 1	ESP; Ret	AUT; Ret	MON; Ret	CAN; 1	EUR; 4	**FRA**; 2	GBR; Ret	GER; 1	HUN; 4	BEL; 7	ITA; 3	USA; Ret	JPN; 6			4th	49
2002	BMW WilliamsF1 Team	Williams FW24	BMW P82 3.0 V10	AUS; Ret	MAL; 1	BRA; 2	SMR; 3	ESP; 11^{†}	AUT; 4	MON; 3	CAN; 7	EUR; 4	GBR; 8	FRA; 5	GER; 3	HUN; 3	BEL; 5	ITA; Ret	USA; 16	JPN; 11^{†}			4th	42
2003	BMW WilliamsF1 Team	Williams FW25	BMW P83 3.0 V10	AUS; 8	MAL; 4	BRA; 7	SMR; 4	ESP; 5	AUT; 6	**MON**; 4	**CAN**; 2	EUR; 1	**FRA**; 1	GBR; 9	GER; Ret	HUN; 4	ITA; WD	USA; Ret	JPN; 12				5th	58
2004	BMW WilliamsF1 Team	Williams FW26	BMW P84 3.0 V10	AUS; 4	MAL; Ret	BHR; 7	SMR; 7	ESP; 6	MON; 10^{†}	EUR; Ret	**CAN**; DSQ	USA; Ret	FRA	GBR	GER	HUN	BEL	ITA	CHN; Ret	JPN; 2	BRA; 5		9th	24
2005	Panasonic Toyota Racing	Toyota TF105	Toyota RVX-05 3.0 V10	AUS; 12	MAL; 5	BHR; 4	SMR; 9	ESP; 4	MON; 6	EUR; Ret	CAN; 6	USA; WD	FRA; 7	GBR; 8	GER; 6	HUN; 3	TUR; 12	ITA; 6	BEL; 7	BRA; 8			6th	45
2005	Panasonic Toyota Racing	Toyota TF105B	Toyota RVX-05 3.0 V10																		**JPN**; 8	CHN; 3	6th	45
2006	Panasonic Toyota Racing	Toyota TF106	Toyota RVX-06 2.4 V8	BHR; 14	MAL; 8	AUS; 3	SMR; 9	EUR; Ret	ESP; Ret														10th	20
2006	Panasonic Toyota Racing	Toyota TF106B	Toyota RVX-06 2.4 V8							MON; 8	GBR; Ret	CAN; Ret	USA; Ret	FRA; 4	GER; 9	HUN; 6	TUR; 7	ITA; 15	CHN; Ret	JPN; 7	BRA; Ret		10th	20
2007	Panasonic Toyota Racing	Toyota TF107	Toyota RVX-07 2.4 V8	AUS; 8	MAL; 15	BHR; 12	ESP; Ret	MON; 16	CAN; 8	USA; Ret	FRA; 10	GBR; Ret	EUR; Ret	HUN; 6	TUR; 12	ITA; 15	BEL; 10	JPN; Ret	CHN; Ret	BRA; 11			16th	5

^{†} Did not finish, but was classified as he had completed more than 90% of the race distance.

=== Complete DTM results ===
(key) (Races in bold indicate pole position) (Races in italics indicate fastest lap)

Year	Team	Car	1	2	3	4	5	6	7	8	9	10	11	Pos.	Pts
2008	Mücke Motorsport	AMG-Mercedes C-Klasse 2007	HOC; 14	OSC; 10	MUG; Ret	LAU; 13	NOR; 16	ZAN; 12	NÜR; 8	BRH; 15	CAT; 7	BUG; Ret	HOC; 14	14th	3
2009	HWA Team	AMG-Mercedes C-Klasse 2009	HOC; 9	LAU; 10	NOR; 6	ZAN; 10	OSC; 11	NÜR; 7	BRH; 9	CAT; 13	DIJ; 5	HOC; Ret		11th	9
2010	HWA Team	AMG-Mercedes C-Klasse 2009	HOC; 9	VAL; Ret	LAU; 9	**NOR**; 11	NÜR; 6	ZAN; 9	BRH; Ret	OSC; 9	HOC; Ret	ADR; 12	SHA; 10	14th	3
2011	HWA Team	AMG-Mercedes C-Klasse 2009	HOC; 3	ZAN; 11	SPL; 2	LAU; 12	NOR; 6	NÜR; Ret	BRH; 5	OSC; Ret	VAL; 13	HOC; 11		8th	21
2012	HWA Team	AMG Mercedes C-Coupé 2012	HOC; 7	LAU; 10	BRH; 19	SPL; 11	NOR; Ret	NÜR; 13	ZAN; 10	OSC; 13	VAL; 14	HOC; 9		17th	10

Sporting positions
Preceded by Sascha Maassen	Macau Grand Prix; Winner; 1995	Succeeded by Ralph Firman
Preceded by Toshio Suzuki (Japanese Formula 3000)	Formula Nippon; Champion; 1996	Succeeded by Pedro de la Rosa
Trade union offices
Preceded by David Coulthard	GPDA Chairman; 2006–2008	Succeeded by Pedro de la Rosa
Records
Preceded by Elio de Angelis; 21 years, 307 days (1980 Brazilian GP)	Youngest driver to score a podium position in Formula One; 21 years, 287 days (1997 Argentine Grand Prix)	Succeeded by Fernando Alonso; 21 years, 237 days (2003 Malaysian GP)
