= 2005 Japanese Grand Prix =

Coordinates: 34°50′35″N 136°32′26″E

Race 18 of 19 in the 2005 Formula One World Championship
← Previous race	Next race →

Race details
- Date: 9 October 2005
- Official name: 2005 Formula 1 Fuji Television Japanese Grand Prix
- Location: Suzuka International Racing Course, Suzuka, Mie, Japan
- Course: Permanent racing facility
- Course length: 5.807 km (3.608 miles)
- Distance: 53 laps, 307.573 km (191.117 miles)
- Weather: Partially cloudy and dry with temperatures reaching up to 25 °C (77 °F)
- Attendance: 320,000

Pole position
Driver	(Germany) Ralf Schumacher	Toyota
- Time: 1:46.106

Fastest lap
Driver	(Finland) Kimi Räikkönen	McLaren-Mercedes
- Time: 1:31.540 on lap 44

Podium
First	(Finland) Kimi Räikkönen	McLaren-Mercedes
Second	(Italy) Giancarlo Fisichella	Renault
Third	(Spain) Fernando Alonso	Renault

The 2005 Japanese Grand Prix (officially known as the 2005 Formula One Fuji Television Japanese Grand Prix) was a Formula One race which was held at Suzuka International Racing Course on 9 October 2005. It was the eighteenth and penultimate round of the 2005 Formula One World Championship, the thirty-first running of the Japanese Grand Prix and nineteenth to be held at Suzuka.

Kimi Räikkönen won the race after starting from seventeenth, overtaking long-time race leader Giancarlo Fisichella on the final lap to win a race that saw many overtaking manoeuvres. Fisichella's teammate Fernando Alonso completed the podium, having come through from sixteenth, including an overtake on Michael Schumacher around the outside of 130R corner.

The race marked Ralf Schumacher's sixth and final pole position in Formula One.

This was also Räikkönen's last win until the 2007 Australian Grand Prix, his last win for McLaren, the team's last win until the 2007 Malaysian Grand Prix, and the last win for a driver that started 17th on the grid until Max Verstappen at the 2024 São Paulo Grand Prix.

== Background ==
Fernando Alonso was crowned world champion at the previous round in Brazil, but the battle for the Constructors' Championship between McLaren-Mercedes and Renault continued at the penultimate round, with McLaren leading by two points.

At a press conference before the Japanese Grand Prix, Honda announced the acquisition of all shares in BAR. Toyota decided to bring the renewed TF105B to the last two races of the season.

Antônio Pizzonia, who had driven for Williams in the three previous Grands Prix, was confirmed as a replacement for the injured Nick Heidfeld for the last two races of the season as well. One option to replace Heidfeld in the last two races was test driver Nico Rosberg, but the team decided against this as Rosberg had not previously driven at the two circuits.

== Practice ==
Teams that finished fifth or lower in the 2004 Constructors' Championship were entitled to run a third car in free practice on Friday. These drivers participated on Friday, but did not compete in qualifying or the race. Of the six teams, only four had third drivers at Suzuka: McLaren (Pedro de la Rosa), Red Bull (Vitantonio Liuzzi), Toyota (Ricardo Zonta) and Jordan (Sakon Yamamoto).

Pedro de la Rosa was fastest in first free practice, completing 23 laps and finished more than half a second ahead of Ricardo Zonta, who was more than a second faster than Michael Schumacher in FP2. The weather took a turn for the worse on Saturday and had an effect on the amount of running in the final two practice sessions. Michael Schumacher ended up top of the timesheets in FP3, over two seconds quicker than Kimi Räikkönen, with Giancarlo Fisichella clocking the fastest time in final practice, edging out Narain Karthikeyan by 0.014s.

== Qualifying ==
Qualifying was held on a wet track, with conditions later deteriorating, forcing some of the usual front runners to qualify near the back of the grid. Ralf Schumacher qualified on pole, edging out Jenson Button by 0.035s. Fisichella was third, with home favourite Takuma Sato in fifth. The end of qualifying saw the top finishers from the last race attempt to set a lap time. But by this point the conditions had worsened and Michael Schumacher, Fernando Alonso, Kimi Räikkönen and Juan Pablo Montoya all qualifying in fourteenth, sixteenth, seventeenth and eighteenth places respectively. Montoya did not set a lap time. Jarno Trulli and Tiago Monteiro also failed to set a time.

=== Qualifying classification ===
Pos	No	Driver	Constructor	Lap	Gap	Grid
1	17	(Germany) Ralf Schumacher	Toyota	1:46.106	—	1
2	3	(United Kingdom) Jenson Button	BAR-Honda	1:46.141	+0.035	2
3	6	(Italy) Giancarlo Fisichella	Renault	1:46.276	+0.170	3
4	15	(Austria) Christian Klien	Red Bull-Cosworth	1:46.464	+0.358	4
5	4	(Japan) Takuma Sato	BAR-Honda	1:46.841	+0.735	5
6	14	(United Kingdom) David Coulthard	Red Bull-Cosworth	1:46.892	+0.786	6
7	7	(Australia) Mark Webber	Williams-BMW	1:47.233	+1.127	7
8	11	(Canada) Jacques Villeneuve	Sauber-Petronas	1:47.440	+1.334	8
9	2	(Brazil) Rubens Barrichello	Ferrari	1:48.248	+2.142	9
10	12	(Brazil) Felipe Massa	Sauber-Petronas	1:48.278	+2.172	10
11	19	(India) Narain Karthikeyan	Jordan-Toyota	1:48.718	+2.612	11
12	8	(Brazil) Antonio Pizzonia	Williams-BMW	1:48.898	+2.792	12
13	21	(Netherlands) Christijan Albers	Minardi-Cosworth	1:50.843	+4.737	13
14	1	(Germany) Michael Schumacher	Ferrari	1:52.676	+6.570	14
15	20	(Monaco) Robert Doornbos	Minardi-Cosworth	1:52.894	+6.788	15
16	5	(Spain) Fernando Alonso	Renault	1:54.667	+8.561	16
17	9	(Finland) Kimi Räikkönen	McLaren-Mercedes	2:02.309	+16.203	17^{1}
18	10	(Colombia) Juan Pablo Montoya	McLaren-Mercedes	No time^{2}		18
19	16	(Italy) Jarno Trulli	Toyota	No time^{3}		19
20	18	(Portugal) Tiago Monteiro	Jordan-Toyota	No time^{4}		20

Notes

- ^1 – Kimi Räikkönen received a 10-place grid penalty for an engine change.
- ^2 – Juan Pablo Montoya did not complete the timed lap.
- ^3 – Jarno Trulli spun on a timed lap in turn nine.
- ^4 – Tiago Monteiro spun out in turn nine on the out lap.

== Race ==
Ralf Schumacher maintained the lead off the start, while Giancarlo Fisichella jumped Jenson Button and Red Bull's David Coulthard moved from sixth to eighth. But local hero Sato ran wide into the gravel at turn one and his right-front tyre was sideswiped by Rubens Barrichello. Both continued, but the left rear of Barrichello's Ferrari was punctured, leading to a pit stop at the end of lap one. Alonso made a flying start and was up to seventh by the time the field was completing the first lap. Raikkonen went straight on at the Casio Triangle chicane, before teammate Juan Pablo Montoya crashed heavily while coming onto the pit straight after trying to drive around the Sauber of Jacques Villeneuve, but the Canadian squeezed him and onto the gravel, making the Colombian the first retirement of the afternoon and severely damaging McLaren's Constructors' Championship hopes. The accident resulted in the safety car being deployed.

On lap 10, Sato attempted to overtake Trulli into the chicane, but never looked like pulling the move off and the resulting contact forced Trulli into retirement. Ralf was the first of the leaders to pit, coming in for the first of three stops at the end of lap 13. This counted him out of the running for the race victory, with Fisichella assuming the lead.

On lap 19, Alonso pulled off one of the most audacious overtaking manoeuvres with a pass around the outside of Michael Schumacher at the infamous 130R corner. Raikkonen had a sniff of passing the seven-time world champion into the very next turn, the Casio Triangle, but had to settle in behind the Ferrari. Alonso stopped first of the trio, but because he pitted for fuel before Michael and Raikkonen, he came back out behind the duo, with Raikkonen passing Michael on the pit straight on lap 29. On lap 32, Michael went deep into the chicane, giving Alonso the opportunity to pass again, which he did down the pit straight and swept into turn one ahead of the German.

Raikkonen made his final stop on lap 45, handing the lead back to Fisichella. But as he emerged from the pits, Raikkonen was about to go on a thrilling charge. Alonso had closed up to the back of the Williams-BMW of Mark Webber by the end of lap 49 and despite being forced onto the grass, the world champion was able to complete the overtake on the Australian and took third place. Raikkonen took 1.3 seconds out of Fisichella's lead on lap 49 and was now right on the rear-wing of the Italian. Raikkonen lined up the overtake going into the chicane, but Fisichella went defensive, leaving him vulnerable to an attack from Raikkonen, who was given all the motivation he needed to slingshot past the Renault into turn one to complete a brilliant recovery drive for his seventh win of the season.

=== Post-race ===
Jacques Villeneuve had 25 seconds added to his race time for causing Juan Pablo Montoya to crash out on the first lap, while Takuma Sato was disqualified from the final classification for his lap 10 collision with Jarno Trulli which caused the Italian to retire from the race.

=== Race classification ===
Pos.	No.	Driver	Constructor	Tyre	Laps	Time/Retired	Grid	Points
1	9	(Finland) Kimi Räikkönen	McLaren-Mercedes	M	53	1:29:02.212	17	10
2	6	(Italy) Giancarlo Fisichella	Renault	M	53	+1.633	3	8
3	5	(Spain) Fernando Alonso	Renault	M	53	+17.456	16	6
4	7	(Australia) Mark Webber	Williams-BMW	M	53	+22.274	7	5
5	3	(United Kingdom) Jenson Button	BAR-Honda	M	53	+29.507	2	4
6	14	(United Kingdom) David Coulthard	Red Bull-Cosworth	M	53	+31.601	6	3
7	1	(Germany) Michael Schumacher	Ferrari	B	53	+33.879	14	2
8	17	(Germany) Ralf Schumacher	Toyota	M	53	+49.548	1	1
9	15	(Austria) Christian Klien	Red Bull-Cosworth	M	53	+51.925	4	
10	12	(Brazil) Felipe Massa	Sauber-Petronas	M	53	+57.509	10	
11	2	(Brazil) Rubens Barrichello	Ferrari	B	53	+1:00.633	9	
12	11	(Canada) Jacques Villeneuve	Sauber-Petronas	M	53	+1:23.221^{6}	8	
13	18	(Portugal) Tiago Monteiro	Jordan-Toyota	B	52	+1 Lap	20	
14	20	(Monaco) Robert Doornbos	Minardi-Cosworth	B	51	+2 Laps	15	
15	19	(India) Narain Karthikeyan	Jordan-Toyota	B	51	+2 Laps	11	
16	21	(Netherlands) Christijan Albers	Minardi-Cosworth	B	49	+4 Laps	13	
Ret	8	(Brazil) Antônio Pizzonia	Williams-BMW	M	9	Spun off	12	
Ret	16	(Italy) Jarno Trulli	Toyota	M	9	Collision damage	PL^{5}	
Ret	10	(Colombia) Juan Pablo Montoya	McLaren-Mercedes	M	0	Accident	18	
DSQ	4	(Japan) Takuma Sato	BAR-Honda	M	52	Caused collision with Trulli^{7}	5	

Notes

- ^5 – Jarno Trulli started from the pit lane.
- ^6 – Jacques Villeneuve was handed a 25-second time penalty for his collision with Juan Pablo Montoya.
- ^7 – Takuma Sato finished thirteenth but was disqualified from the final classification for his collision with Jarno Trulli.

== Championship standings after the race ==
Drivers' Championship standings

	Pos.	Driver	Points
Unchanged	1	(Spain) Fernando Alonso	123
Unchanged	2	(Finland) Kimi Räikkönen	104
1	3	(Germany) Michael Schumacher	62
1	4	(Colombia) Juan Pablo Montoya	60
Unchanged	5	(Italy) Giancarlo Fisichella	53

Constructors' Championship standings

	Pos.	Constructor	Points
1	1	(France) Renault	176
1	2	(United Kingdom) McLaren-Mercedes	174
Unchanged	3	(Italy) Ferrari	100
Unchanged	4	(Japan) Toyota	82
Unchanged	5	(United Kingdom) Williams-BMW	64

- Note: Only the top five positions are included for both sets of standings.

Previous race: 2005 Brazilian Grand Prix	FIA Formula One World Championship; 2005 season	Next race: 2005 Chinese Grand Prix
Previous race: 2004 Japanese Grand Prix	Japanese Grand Prix	Next race: 2006 Japanese Grand Prix
