= 2005 Chinese Grand Prix =

Grand Prix race

Coordinates: 31°20′20″N 121°13′11″E

Race 19 of 19 in the 2005 Formula One World Championship
← Previous race	Next race →

Race details
- Date: 16 October 2005
- Official name: 2005 Formula 1 Sinopec Chinese Grand Prix
- Location: Shanghai International Circuit; Shanghai, China
- Course: Permanent Racing Facility
- Course length: 5.451 km (3.387 miles)
- Distance: 56 laps, 305.066 km (189.559 miles)
- Weather: Sunny
- Attendance: 270,000 (Weekend)

Pole position
Driver	(Spain) Fernando Alonso	Renault
- Time: 1.34.080

Fastest lap
Driver	(Finland) Kimi Räikkönen	McLaren-Mercedes
- Time: 1.33.242 on lap 56

Podium
First	(Spain) Fernando Alonso	Renault
Second	(Finland) Kimi Räikkönen	McLaren-Mercedes
Third	(Germany) Ralf Schumacher	Toyota

The 2005 Chinese Grand Prix (officially the 2005 Formula 1 Sinopec Chinese Grand Prix) was the nineteenth and final Formula One motor race of the 2005 Formula One season which took place on 16 October 2005 at the Shanghai International Circuit. This was the second Chinese Grand Prix to be held since the event's 2004 inception.

The race was won by the new World Champion, Renault's Fernando Alonso. McLaren driver Kimi Räikkönen was four seconds behind in second position, a reflection of their season long duel for the championship. Toyota driver Ralf Schumacher was third. Renault won the Constructors' Championship at this race.

This was the final race for Antônio Pizzonia and the BAR, Minardi and Jordan teams, although all three teams continued into 2006 under different names (Honda, Toro Rosso and Midland respectively). This was also the last win for a car equipped with a 6-speed gearbox and with a V10 engine.

== Friday drivers ==
The bottom 6 teams in the 2004 Constructors' Championship were entitled to run a third car in free practice on Friday. These drivers drove on Friday but did not compete in qualifying or the race.

Constructor	No	Driver
McLaren-Mercedes	35	(Spain) Pedro de la Rosa
Sauber-Petronas		-
Red Bull-Cosworth	37	(Italy) Vitantonio Liuzzi
Toyota	38	(Brazil) Ricardo Zonta
Jordan-Toyota	39	(Denmark) Nicolas Kiesa
Minardi-Cosworth		-

== Report ==
=== Background ===
After the Japanese Grand Prix, Fernando Alonso led the drivers' standings with 19 points ahead of Kimi Räikkönen and 61 points ahead of Michael Schumacher. Renault led the constructors' championship by 2 points ahead of McLaren and 76 points ahead of Ferrari. This was the final race with Jim Rosenthal as ITV anchor in the United Kingdom. Rosenthal had held the role since ITV took over the UK's coverage of Formula One in 1997. For the 2006 season, Steve Rider returned to his position as anchor after losing his job when ITV got the rights to broadcast for 1997. On BBC Radio 5 Live, this was Ben Edwards' final race as radio commentator. Starting from 2006, David Croft would gain the commentary position alongside Maurice Hamilton. Edwards would later return for the 2012 season replacing Martin Brundle on BBC TV commentary.

=== Qualifying ===
Alonso took pole ahead of his teammate Giancarlo Fisichella. Raikkonen finished third ahead of Jenson Button and Juan Pablo Montoya.

=== Race ===
During warmup, as the cars ran from the pits to line up on the grid, a slow-moving Michael Schumacher pulled left into the path of Christijan Albers who was at speed. The cars collided causing considerable damage to each, earning Schumacher a reprimand from the stewards after the race. Both drivers changed to their teams' spare cars and started the race from the pitlane, along with Narain Karthikeyan. Alonso dominated the race, taking a lights-to-flag victory, capping a best-ever season for Renault which included victories in both titles. McLaren's bid for the constructors' championship effectively ended on lap 25, when Montoya's engine failed, ending his race, having also sustained damage from running over a loose drain cover – the drain incident was a known issue with the circuit, having occurred earlier in the year in a touring car event.

Renault's number two driver Giancarlo Fisichella's chances of making the podium ended when he received a drive-through penalty for obstructive driving in the pits during the second safety car period. He ended the race less than a second behind Ralf Schumacher. Red Bull's Christian Klien had a career-best drive to take fifth position with Felipe Massa, Mark Webber and Jenson Button completing the point-scoring finishers. Räikkönen recorded the race's fastest lap, a record-equalling tenth for the season.

== Classification ==
=== Qualifying ===
Qualifying took place on October 15.

Pos	No	Driver	Constructor	Lap	Gap	Grid
1	5	(Spain) Fernando Alonso	Renault	1:34.080	—	1
2	6	(Italy) Giancarlo Fisichella	Renault	1:34.401	+0.321	2
3	9	(Finland) Kimi Räikkönen	McLaren-Mercedes	1:34.488	+0.408	3
4	3	(United Kingdom) Jenson Button	BAR-Honda	1:34.801	+0.721	4
5	10	(Colombia) Juan Pablo Montoya	McLaren-Mercedes	1:35.188	+1.108	5
6	1	(Germany) Michael Schumacher	Ferrari	1:35.301	+1.221	6
7	14	(United Kingdom) David Coulthard	Red Bull-Cosworth	1:35.428	+1.348	7
8	2	(Brazil) Rubens Barrichello	Ferrari	1:35.610	+1.534	8
9	17	(Germany) Ralf Schumacher	Toyota	1:35.723	+1.645	9
10	7	(Australia) Mark Webber	Williams-BMW	1:35.739	+1.659	10
11	12	(Brazil) Felipe Massa	Sauber-Petronas	1:35.898	+1.818	11
12	16	(Italy) Jarno Trulli	Toyota	1:36.044	+1.964	12
13	8	(Brazil) Antônio Pizzonia	Williams-BMW	1:36.445	+2.365	13
14	15	(Austria) Christian Klien	Red Bull-Cosworth	1:36.472	+2.392	14
15	19	(India) Narain Karthikeyan	Jordan-Toyota	1:36.707	+2.627	15
16	11	(Canada) Jacques Villeneuve	Sauber-Petronas	1:36.788	+2.708	16
17	4	(Japan) Takuma Sato	BAR-Honda	1:37.083	+3.003	17
18	21	(Netherlands) Christijan Albers	Minardi-Cosworth	1:39.105	+5.025	18
19	18	(Portugal) Tiago Monteiro	Jordan-Toyota	1:39.233	+5.153	19
20	20	(Monaco) Robert Doornbos	Minardi-Cosworth	1:39.460	+5.380	20

=== Race ===
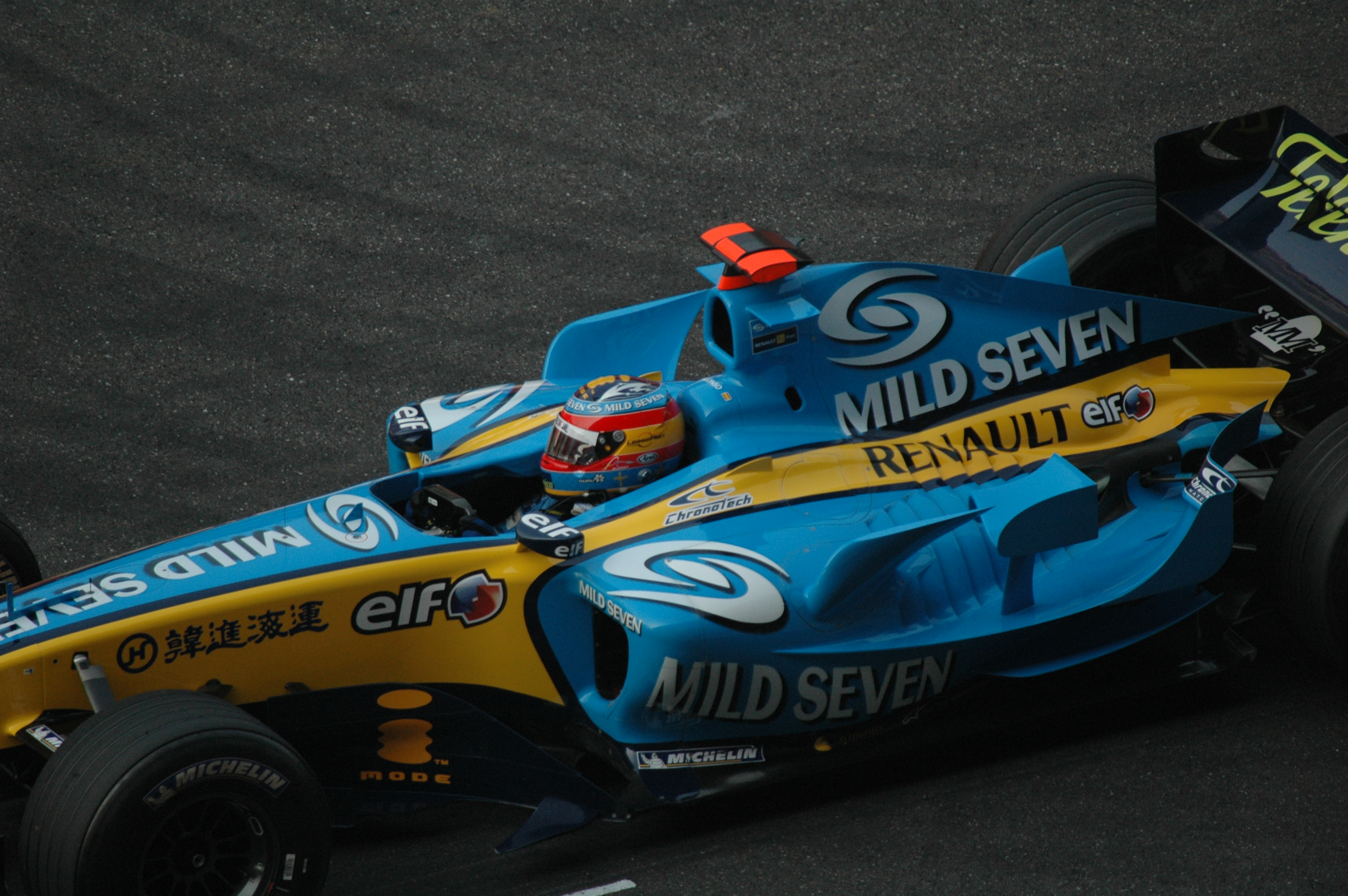
The race was won by Fernando Alonso in the Renault.

Pos	No	Driver	Constructor	Tyre	Laps	Time/Retired	Grid	Points
1	5	(Spain) Fernando Alonso	Renault	MI	56	1:39:53.618	1	10
2	9	(Finland) Kimi Räikkönen	McLaren-Mercedes	MI	56	+4.015	3	8
3	17	(Germany) Ralf Schumacher	Toyota	MI	56	+25.376	9	6
4	6	(Italy) Giancarlo Fisichella	Renault	MI	56	+26.114	2	5
5	15	(Austria) Christian Klien	Red Bull-Cosworth	MI	56	+31.839	14	4
6	12	(Brazil) Felipe Massa	Sauber-Petronas	MI	56	+36.400	11	3
7	7	(Australia) Mark Webber	Williams-BMW	MI	56	+36.842	10	2
8	3	(United Kingdom) Jenson Button	BAR-Honda	MI	56	+41.249	4	1
9	14	(United Kingdom) David Coulthard	Red Bull-Cosworth	MI	56	+44.247	7	
10	11	(Canada) Jacques Villeneuve	Sauber-Petronas	MI	56	+59.977	16	
11	18	(Portugal) Tiago Monteiro	Jordan-Toyota	B	56	+1:24.648	19	
12	2	(Brazil) Rubens Barrichello	Ferrari	B	56	+1:32.812	8	
13	8	(Brazil) Antônio Pizzonia	Williams-BMW	MI	55	Tyre	13	
14	20	(Monaco) Robert Doornbos	Minardi-Cosworth	B	55	Out of fuel	20	
15	16	(Italy) Jarno Trulli	Toyota	MI	55	+1 lap	12	
16	21	(Netherlands) Christijan Albers	Minardi-Cosworth	B	51	Wheel nut	PL^{1}	
Ret	4	(Japan) Takuma Sato	BAR-Honda	MI	34	Gearbox	17	
Ret	19	(India) Narain Karthikeyan	Jordan-Toyota	B	28	Accident	PL^{1}	
Ret	10	(Colombia) Juan Pablo Montoya	McLaren-Mercedes	MI	24	Engine	5	
Ret	1	(Germany) Michael Schumacher	Ferrari	B	22	Spun off	PL^{1}	

Notes

- ^1 – Michael Schumacher, Narain Karthikeyan and Christijan Albers started from the pit lane.

== Final Championship standings ==
- **Bold text** indicates the World Champions.

Drivers' Championship standings

Pos	Driver	Points
1	(Spain) **Fernando Alonso**	133
2	(Finland) Kimi Räikkönen	112
3	(Germany) Michael Schumacher	62
4	(Colombia) Juan Pablo Montoya	60
5	(Italy) Giancarlo Fisichella	58

Constructors' Championship standings

Pos	Constructor	Points
1	(France) **Renault**	191
2	(United Kingdom) McLaren-Mercedes	182
3	(Italy) Ferrari	100
4	(Japan) Toyota	88
5	(United Kingdom) Williams-BMW	66

- Note: Only the top five positions are included for both sets of standings.

Previous race: 2005 Japanese Grand Prix	FIA Formula One World Championship; 2005 season	Next race: 2006 Bahrain Grand Prix
Previous race: 2004 Chinese Grand Prix	Chinese Grand Prix	Next race: 2006 Chinese Grand Prix
