= Sascha Maassen =

German racecar driver

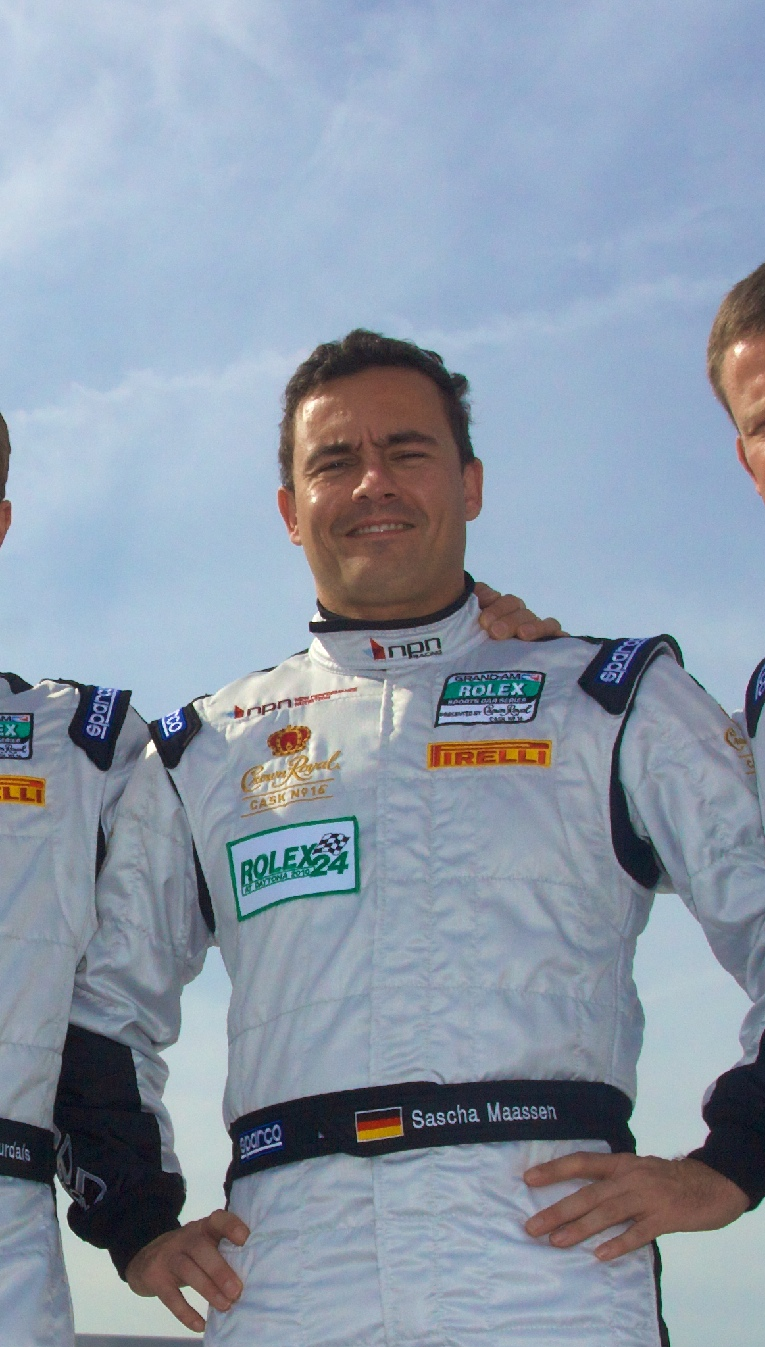
- Maassen in 2010
- Nationality: (Germany) German
- Born: 28 September 1969 (age 57) Aachen, Germany
- Relatives: Montego Maassen (son)
- Categorisation: FIA Platinum (until 2014); FIA Gold (2015–2024); FIA Silver (2025–)

24 Hours of Le Mans career
- Years: 2000 – 2004, 2008 – 2009
- Teams: Skea Racing International, Dick Barbour Racing, Freisinger Motorsport, Alex Job Racing, White Lightning Racing, Team Essex, NAVI Team Goh
- Best finish: 10th (2004)
- Class wins: 2 (2003, 2004)

Sascha Maassen (born 28 September 1969 in Aachen, Germany) is a veteran sports car driver.

== Early career ==
Maassen began his career in karts, and moved to cars in 1989, in Formula Ford 1600. During the early 1990s, he raced in the German Formula 3 series. His F3 career includes a win at the prestigious Macau Grand Prix in 1994. From 1995 to 1997, he raced touring cars for Nissan in the Super Tourenwagen Cup.

== Sports car career ==
In 1998, Maassen moved to the FIA GT Championship, where he raced a Porsche 911 GT2 for Roock Racing, along with Bruno Eichmann. In 1999, he competed in Porsche Supercup. He also drove for Alex Job Racing at Petit Le Mans, where he won the GT class with Cort Wagner and Dirk Müller.

=== 2000 ===
In 2000, Maassen joined Porsche as a factory driver. His primary job was driving a Porsche GT3-R in the American Le Mans Series. He partnered with fellow factory driver Bob Wollek at Dick Barbour Racing. The duo would win five races, including Maassen's second straight Petit Le Mans victory. He also finished second in the GT class at the 24 Hours of Le Mans, driving for Skea Racing International. Maassen also raced sparingly in Supercup, and raced in the 24 Hours Nürburgring, and one race in the Sports Racing World Cup.

=== 2001 ===
In 2001, Maassen was paired with Lucas Luhr at Alex Job Racing. They would win at Texas and the 12 Hours of Sebring in the GT class in a season otherwise dominated by the BMW M3 GTRs. Maassen also raced prototypes, at the 24 Hours of Daytona for Champion Racing, and for Dick Barbour Racing at Le Mans.

=== 2002 ===
Maassen started 2002 by finishing fourth at the 24 Hours of Daytona for Champion Racing. Maassen and Luhr dominated the GT class of the ALMS, winning seven of ten races en route to the championship. These victories included second straight Sebring win, and third career Petit Le Mans win.

=== 2003 ===
2003 saw Maassen and Luhr win the championship again, and win Sebring for the third year in a row. Maassen also notched his 20th class win in the ALMS at Miami. He also won the Grand-Am round at Circuit Mont-Tremblant in a Brumos Racing Fabcar-Porsche.

=== 2004 & 2005 ===
In 2004, Maassen acted mainly as a third driver for the longer endurance races, winning at Sebring and Petit Le Mans for Alex Job, and winning the GT class at Le Mans with Petersen Motorsports. 2005 saw him focus mainly on the development of the new Porsche RS Spyder, including racing in the car's debut at Laguna Seca.

=== 2006 ===
In 2006, Maassen would race the RS Spyder and win the LMP2 championship with Lucas Luhr. Maassen and Luhr would drive together for the first six races of the season, including one win (at Miller Motorsports Park) and an overall second place (at Mid-Ohio). Maassen the partnered with Timo Bernhard for the remainder of the season, collecting two wins.

=== 2007 ===
Maassen continued driving for Penske in the ALMS.

=== 2008 ===
Maassen continued driving for Penske in the ALMS, and competed in the 2008 edition of 24 hour Le Mans with Team Essex where he finished second in the LMP2 class together with John Nielsen and Casper Elgaard.

== Racing record ==
=== 24 Hours of Le Mans results ===
Year	Team	Co-Drivers	Car	Class	Laps	Pos.	Class Pos.
2000	(Australia) Skea Racing International	(United Kingdom) Johnny Mowlem (United States) David Murry	Porsche 911 GT3-R	GT	304	17th	**2nd**
2001	(United States) Dick Barbour Racing	(Belgium) Didier de Radiguès (Japan) Hideshi Matsuda	Reynard 01Q-LM-Judd	LMP675	95	DNF	DNF
2002	(Germany) Freisinger Motorsport	(France) Romain Dumas (Germany) Jörg Bergmeister	Porsche 911 GT3-RS	GT	321	17th	**2nd**
2003	(United States) Alex Job Racing (United States) Petersen Motorsports	(France) Emmanuel Collard (Germany) Lucas Luhr	Porsche 911 GT3-RS	GT	320	14th	**1st**
2004	(United States) White Lightning Racing	(Germany) Jörg Bergmeister (United States) Patrick Long	Porsche 911 GT3-RS	GT	327	10th	**1st**
2008	(Denmark) Team Essex	(Denmark) Casper Elgaard (Denmark) John Nielsen	Porsche RS Spyder Evo	LMP2	347	12th	**2nd**
2009	(Japan) Navi Team Goh	(Japan) Seiji Ara (Japan) Keisuke Kunimoto	Porsche RS Spyder Evo	LMP2	339	DNF	DNF

=== Complete Super Tourenwagen Cup results ===
(key) (Races in bold indicate pole position) (Races in italics indicate fastest lap)

Year	Team	Car	1	2	3	4	5	6	7	8	9	10	11	12	13	14	15	16	17	18	19	20	DC	Points
1995	Nissan Primera Racing	Nissan Primera	ZOL; 1; 23	ZOL; 2; 9	SPA; 1; 11	SPA; 2; 14	ÖST; 1; 14	ÖST; 2 Ret	HOC; 1; 13	HOC; 2 Ret	NÜR; 1; 8	NÜR; 2; 8	SAL; 1 Ret	SAL; 2; 13	AVU; 1; 11	AVU; 2 Ret	NÜR; 1	NÜR; 2					14th	128
1996	Nissan Primera Racing	Nissan Primera	ZOL; 1; 15	ZOL; 2; 13	ASS; 1 Ret	ASS; 2; 14	HOC; 1; 13	HOC; 2; 11	SAC; 1; 17	SAC; 2; 12	WUN; 1; 15	WUN; 2; 20	ZWE; 1 Ret	ZWE; 2 DNS	SAL; 1; 9	SAL; 2; 6	AVU; 1	AVU; 2	NÜR; 1; 14	NÜR; 2; 10			17th	165
1997	Nissan Primera Racing	Nissan Primera	HOC; 1; 14	HOC; 2 Ret	ZOL; 1; 8	ZOL; 2; 7	NÜR; 1; 10	NÜR; 2; 8	SAC; 1; 7	SAC; 2; 11	NOR; 1; 9	NOR; 2; 20	WUN; 1 Ret	WUN; 2; 8	ZWE; 1; 15	ZWE; 2; 12	SAL; 1; 18	SAL; 2; 12	REG; 1; 13	REG; 2; 9	NÜR; 1; 18	NÜR; 2; 11	10th	263

== Accolades ==
- ALMS GT class champion: 2002, 2003
- ALMS LMP2 class champion: 2006
- 24 Hours of Le Mans GT class winner: 2003, 2004
- 12 Hours of Sebring GT class winner: 2001, 2002, 2003, 2004
- FIA GT Championship NGT Class Champion (with Lucas Luhr): 2004
- Petit Le Mans LMP2 class winner: 2006
- Petit Le Mans GT class winner: 1999, 2000, 2002, 2004
- Macau Grand Prix winner: 1994

Sporting positions
Preceded by Jörg Müller	Macau Grand Prix; Winner; 1994	Succeeded by Ralf Schumacher
