= Willi Weber =

German racing driver manager (born 1942)

- Born: Wilhelm Friedrich Weber; 11 March 1942 (age 84); Regensburg, Germany
- Other name: "Willi"
- Known for: Racing driver manager

Wilhelm Friedrich "Willi" Weber (born March 11, 1942 in Regensburg, Germany) is a former manager of several German racing drivers, including Michael Schumacher (until 2012), Ralf Schumacher (until November 2005), Nico Hülkenberg (until 2011), and Timo Scheider. He also held the franchise for A1 Team Germany.

== Early career ==
Weber started learning negotiating skills as a teenager by buying and reselling worn military uniforms. He completed an apprenticeship in hotel management, aiming to operate his own restaurant. He established several businesses near Stuttgart, Germany, achieving success through franchise operations.

In 1983, Weber and engineer Klaus Trella founded Formula Three team WTS (Weber-Trella Stuttgart), where he managed the team. By 1988, the team has won the German Formula Three Championship title with driver Joachim Winkelhock.

== Talent scout and manager ==
During a Formula Ford race at the Salzburgring in Austria, Weber observed Michael Schumacher, a young driver competing in that category for the first time, won the race. Weber subsequently invited Schumacher to test a Formula 3 car at Hockenheimring.

Weber facilitated Schumacher's entry into the German F3 Championship, which was financially challenging for Schumacher due to his background. In his second season, Schumacher won the championship title.

Weber helped Schumacher join the Mercedes-Benz Junior Team in Group C racing, which provided support for Schumacher's debut in Formula One with Jordan Grand Prix at Spa in 1991.

Schumacher's 1994 Formula One World Championship victory boosted motor racing's popularity in Germany. After Schumacher's successful title defense in 1995, Weber decided to focus exclusively on Formula One and sold his Formula 3 team. Schumacher won an additional five titles in the 21st century.

== Outside motorsport ==
Weber's management firm, located near Stuttgart Airport, has represented top models such as Claudia Schiffer and Naomi Campbell. In 1999, Weber opened a restaurant called Weber's Gourmet im Turm at the Fernsehturm Stuttgart. However, the restaurant closed after a few years.
