= Jordan EJ15 =

Formula One racing car

Jordan EJ15 Jordan EJ15B
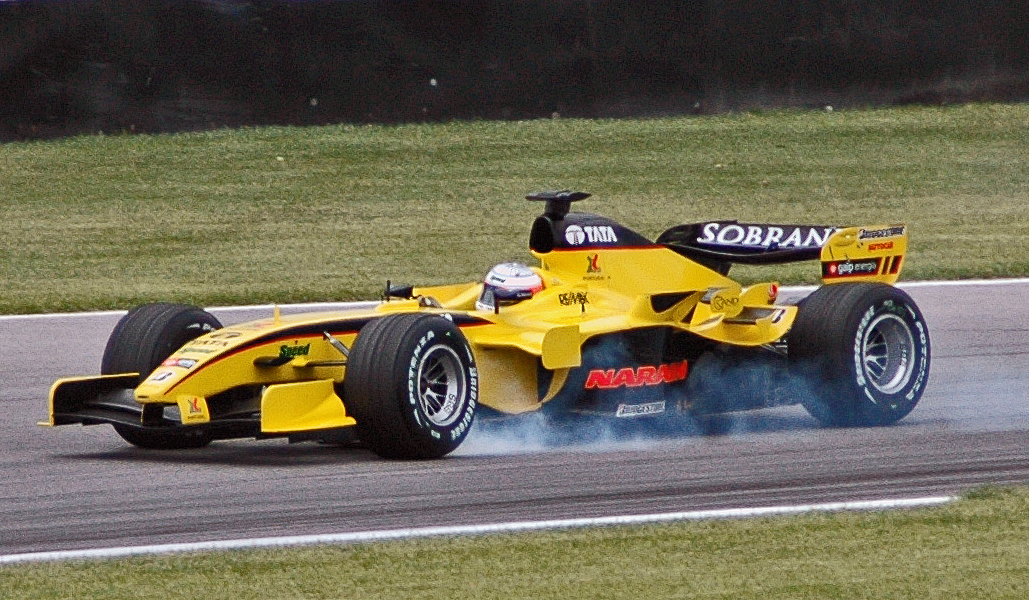
- Narain Karthikeyan in qualifying for the 2005 United States Grand Prix
- Category: Formula One
- Constructor: Jordan
- Designers: James Key (Technical Coordinator); John McQuilliam (Chief Designer); Mike Wroe (Head of Electronics); Simon Phillips (Head of Aerodynamics)
- Predecessor: EJ14
- Successor: M16

Technical specifications
- Chassis: Full Carbon-fibre and honeycomb composite monocoque
- Suspension (front): Double wishbones, pushrod-activated torsion bars and dampers
- Suspension (rear): Double wishbones
- Length: 4,670 mm (183.9 in)
- Width: 1,800 mm (70.9 in)
- Height: 950 mm (37.4 in)
- Axle track: Front: 1,400 mm (55.1 in); Rear: 1,418 mm (55.8 in)
- Wheelbase: >3,000 mm (118.1 in)
- Engine: Toyota RVX-05 3.0 L (183.1 cu in), 90° V10, NA, mid-engine, longitudinally-mounted
- Transmission: Jordan with Toyota internals 7-speed longitudinal, semi-automatic
- Power: 900 hp @ 19,000 rpm
- Fuel: Esso
- Lubricants: Esso
- Tyres: Bridgestone

Competition history
- Notable entrants: Jordan Grand Prix
- Notable drivers: 18. (Portugal) Tiago Monteiro; 19. (India) Narain Karthikeyan
- Debut: 2005 Australian Grand Prix
- Last event: 2005 Chinese Grand Prix
Races	Wins	Podiums	Poles	F/Laps
19	0	1	0	0
- Constructors' Championships: 0
- Drivers' Championships: 0

The Jordan EJ15 was the fifteenth and last Jordan Formula One car. It was used by the team to compete in the 2005 Formula One season. The car was driven by Tiago Monteiro and Narain Karthikeyan.

== Background ==
Jordan had been left without an engine deal for the 2005 season after the Ford Motor Company's decision to put their engine supplier Cosworth up for sale. However, at short notice, Toyota agreed to supply Jordan with engines identical to those used by their own Formula One team and thus Jordan became the first-ever Toyota F1 customer team and also Magneti Marelli electronic control unit (ECU) packages. At the beginning of 2005, the team was sold to Midland Group for US $60 million.

The Jordan name was retained for the 2005 Formula One season, before being changed to MF1 Racing for the 2006 season. Throughout 2005 journalists questioned whether Midland were in Formula One for the long haul. Rumours circulated throughout the season that the team was for sale, and that Eddie Irvine was interested in buying them. The year also saw the introduction of two rookie drivers, Narain Karthikeyan and Tiago Monteiro.

== Racing history ==
=== Season summary ===
2005 confirmed Jordan's status at the back of the grid. A final podium came at the United States Grand Prix, in which only six cars competed. Monteiro led home a Jordan 3–4. Monteiro finished eighth at Spa to give the team its final point and used the EJ15 to finish in all but one race of the season. The team's last grand prix saw a low-key exit; Monteiro finished 11th and Karthikeyan crashed out.

=== EJ15B ===
Jordan developed a B version of its EJ15, intended to be entered from the French Grand Prix onwards, but problems encountered during development testing caused Jordan to delay the arrival of the EJ15B, which only arrived at Italia the last five Grands Prix of the season. Monteiro gave the B spec chassis its debut in Italia whilst Karthikeyan still had the previous model. For the following race in Belgium, both drivers used EJ15Bs, and they would both see out the remainder of the season with the new chassis, with Monteiro's 8th place at Spa its best result.

=== After the season ===
Following the end of the 2005 season, the EJ15B chassis was used in winter testing at Jerez in December 2005 by a variety of drivers including Roman Rusinov, Jeffrey van Hooydonk and Monteiro. This followed the team's rebranding to MF1 Racing, and the car featured an interim testing livery.

== Sponsorship and livery ==
Since 1996, Benson & Hedges was the team's main sponsor and continued through its final year until the team led a serious financial problems. Jordan used the Benson & Hedges logos, except at the Canadian, French, British, Turkey, Italian, Belgian Grands Prix, it was replaced with either "Be on Edge" or driver names. At the Australian, Malaysian, Bahrain, San Marino, Spanish, United States (due to the Tobacco Master Settlement Agreement), Germany, Brazilian, Japanese and Chinese Grands Prix Benson & Hedges was replaced with Sobranie.

At the Australian Grand Prix, the team celebrated 10 years since Melbourne hosted the race at Albert Park; the logo was on the engine cover and the text "Congratulations Melbourne".

At the Canadian Grand Prix, the "Bring Back Hockey" slogan featured on the airbox as a reaction to the 2004-05 NHL lockout.

== Gallery ==
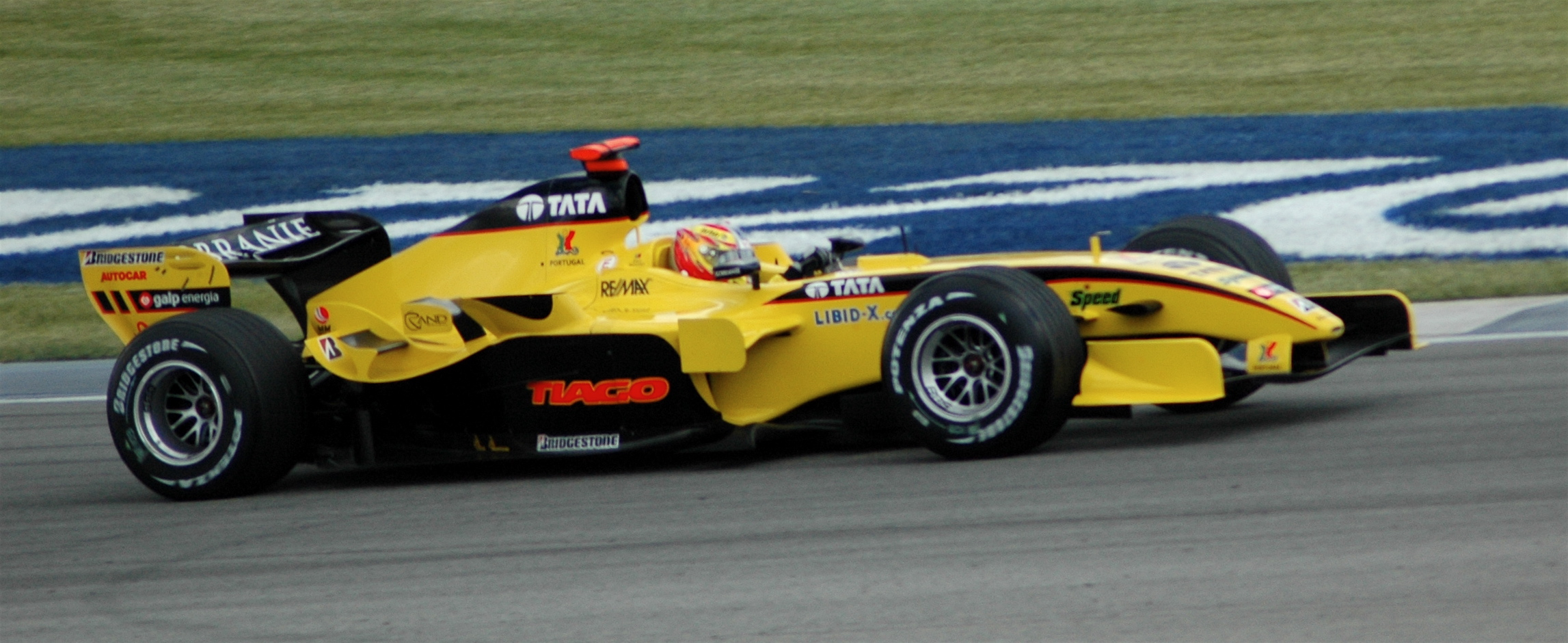
Tiago Monteiro driving at Indianapolis during the 2005 United States Grand Prix.

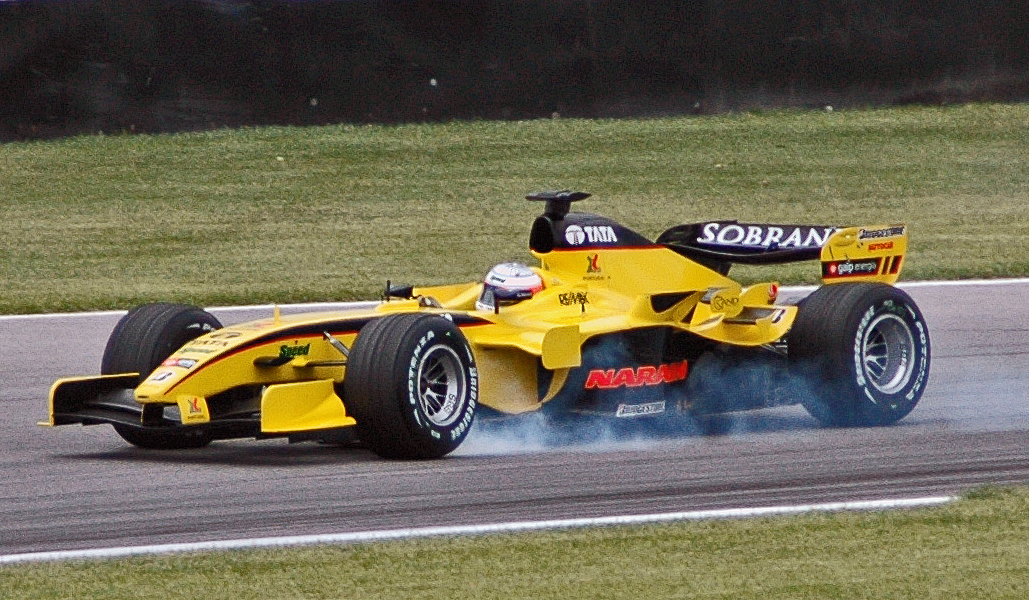
Narain Karthikeyan locking his brakes during qualifying at the 2005 United States Grand Prix.

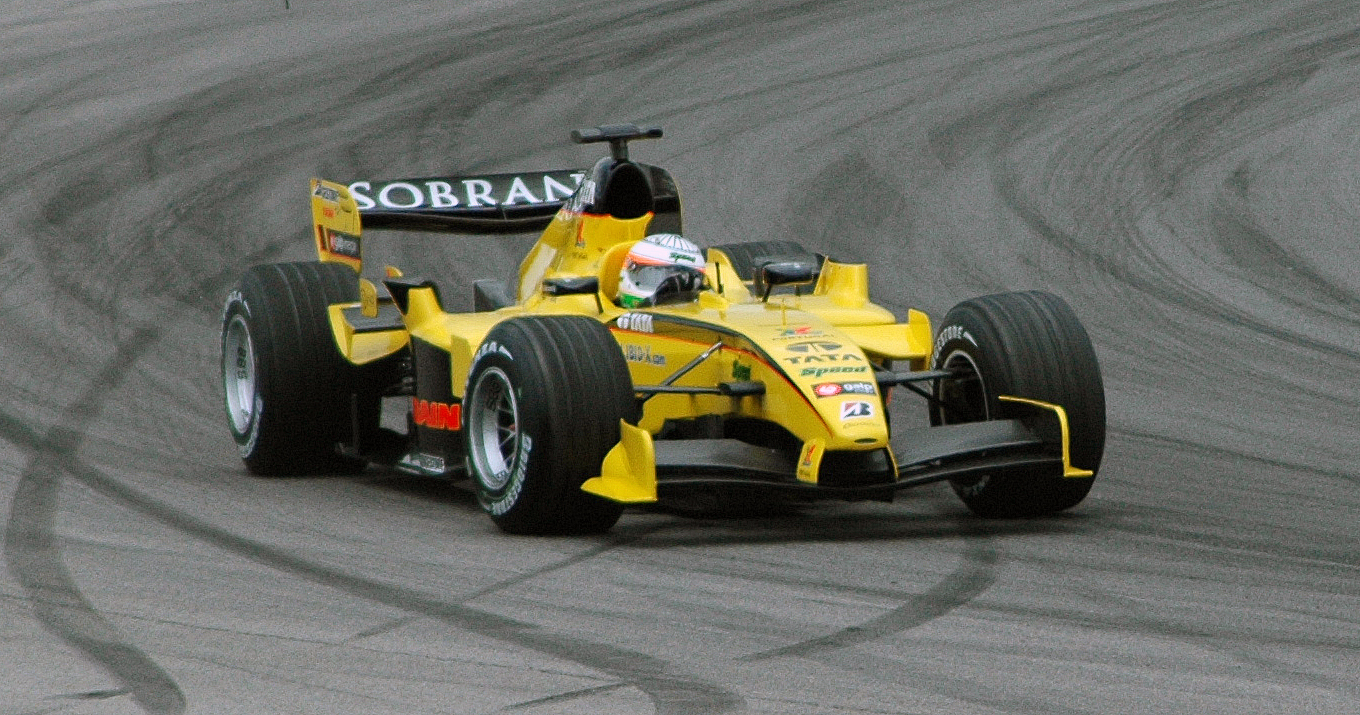
Narain Karthikeyan during qualifying at the 2005 United States Grand Prix.

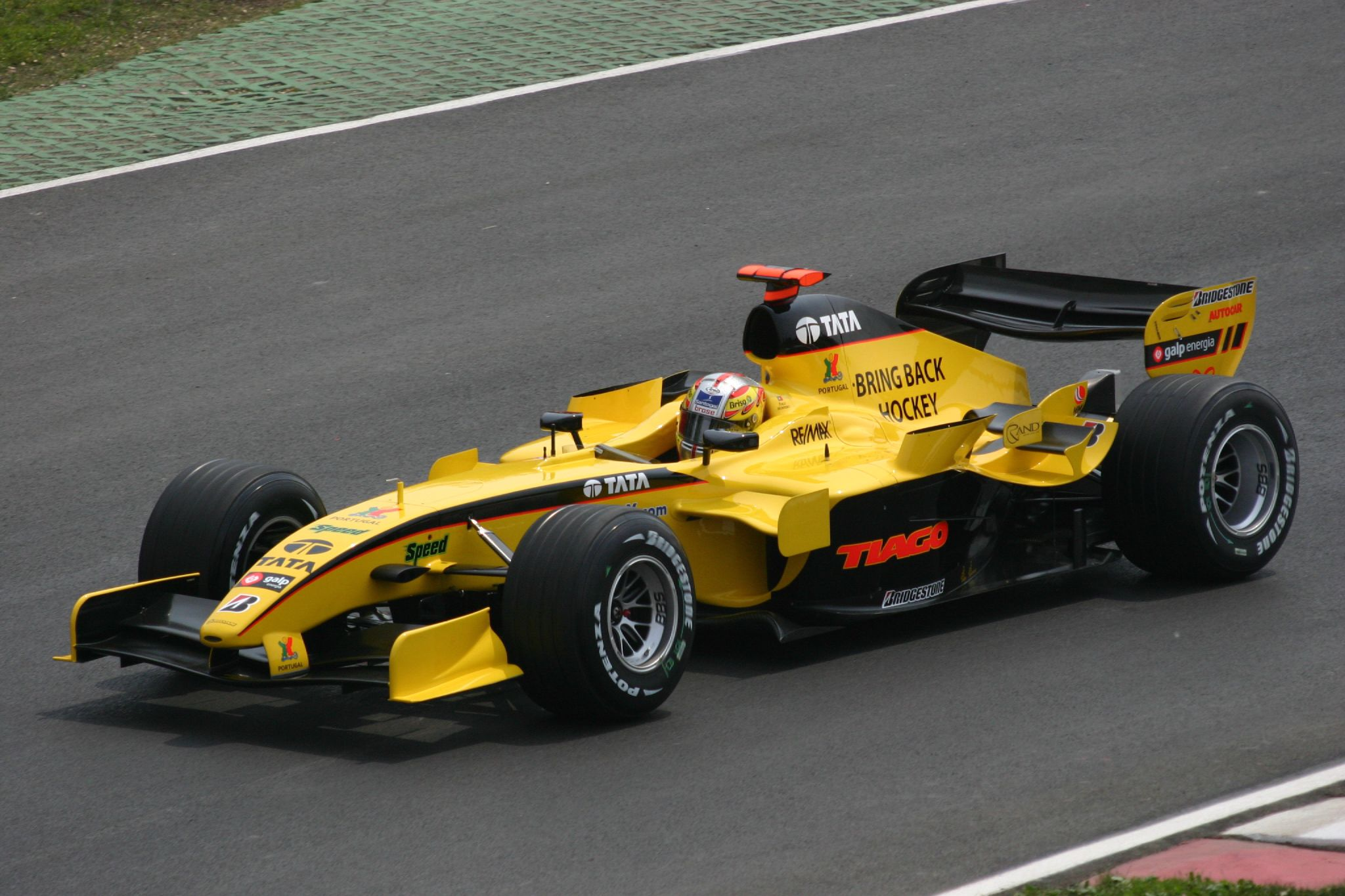
Tiago Monteiro qualifying at the 2005 Canadian Grand Prix.

== Complete Formula One results ==
(key) (results in bold indicate pole position)

Year	Entrant	Chassis	Engine	Tyres	Drivers	1	2	3	4	5	6	7	8	9	10	11	12	13	14	15	16	17	18	19	Points	WCC
2005	Jordan	EJ15	Toyota V10	**B**		AUS	MAL	BHR	SMR	ESP	MON	EUR	CAN	USA	FRA	GBR	GER	HUN	TUR	ITA	BEL	BRA	JPN	CHN	12	9th
2005	Jordan	EJ15	Toyota V10	**B**	(Portugal) Tiago Monteiro	16	12	10	13	12	13	15	10	3	13	17	17	13	15						12	9th
2005	Jordan	EJ15	Toyota V10	**B**	(India) Narain Karthikeyan	15	11	Ret	12	13	Ret	16	Ret	4	15	Ret	16	12	14	20					12	9th
2005	Jordan	EJ15B	Toyota V10	**B**	(Portugal) Tiago Monteiro															17	8	Ret	13	11	12	9th
2005	Jordan	EJ15B	Toyota V10	**B**	(India) Narain Karthikeyan																11	15	15	Ret	12	9th
