= Formula One drivers from Portugal =

Formula One drivers who competed as Portuguese

- Drivers: 5
- Grands Prix: 88
- Entries: 88
- Starts: 73
- Best season finish: 16th (2005)
- Wins: 0
- Podiums: 1
- Pole positions: 0
- Fastest laps: 0
- Points: 8
- First entry: 1958 Portuguese Grand Prix
- Latest entry: 2006 Brazilian Grand Prix
- 2026 drivers: None

There have been five motor racing drivers from Portugal who have participated in a Grand Prix event of the Formula One World Championship, three of which have started in a race. (Note: Drivers on the official entry list for a Grand Prix may not participate in the race if they fail to show sufficient pace in the practice or qualifying sessions, or if they withdraw from the event prior to the race start.) The first to be officially listed as an entrant was Casimiro de Oliveira at the 1958 Portuguese Grand Prix, though Mário de Araújo Cabral was the first driver to take part in a Formula One race, doing so at the 1959 Portuguese Grand Prix. Following Araújo Cabral's final Grand Prix appearance in 1964, no Portuguese driver entered the World Championship until Pedro Chaves in 1991, or competed in a race until Pedro Lamy in 1993. Tiago Monteiro, who contested 37 Grands Prix across the 2005 and 2006 seasons, remains the country's most recent Formula One driver.

Of Portugal's five Grand Prix entrants, only Lamy and Monteiro have scored world championship points. Monteiro is additionally the only Portuguese driver to finish on the podium, having achieved third place at the 2005 United States Grand Prix.

== Former drivers ==
=== Casimiro de Oliveira ===
Casimiro de Oliveira entered the 1958 Portuguese Grand Prix with a Maserati 250F, but withdrew following a test run on the Circuito da Boavista without participating in any official session. He was previously a test driver for Scuderia Ferrari in 1953, and in testing the Ferrari 500 that competed in the 1952 and 1953 Formula One seasons was the first Portuguese driver to drive a car entered into the Formula One World Championship.

=== Mário de Araújo Cabral ===
Mário de Araújo Cabral made his debut at the 1959 Portuguese Grand Prix, becoming the first Portuguese driver to compete in a Formula One race. Entering a Cooper-Maserati, he finished his first race in 10th position. Araújo Cabral participated in a further four World Championship Grands Prix over the next five years, including the 1960 Portuguese Grand Prix, as well as four non-championship races, where his best result was a 4th-place finish at the 1961 Pau Grand Prix. His final Formula One race was the 1964 Italian Grand Prix, after which he competed in a variety of series including Formula 2 and the Le Mans 24 Hours.

=== Pedro Chaves ===
Pedro Chaves became the first Portuguese driver in Formula One for 27 years when he contested the 1991 Formula One season with the uncompetitive Scuderia Coloni team. Chaves failed to pre-qualify for any of the thirteen Grands Prix he entered and left the championship before the first practice session of the 1991 Spanish Grand Prix over non-payments and a lack of testing from the Coloni team. After leaving Formula One Chaves established himself as a rally driver.

=== Pedro Lamy ===
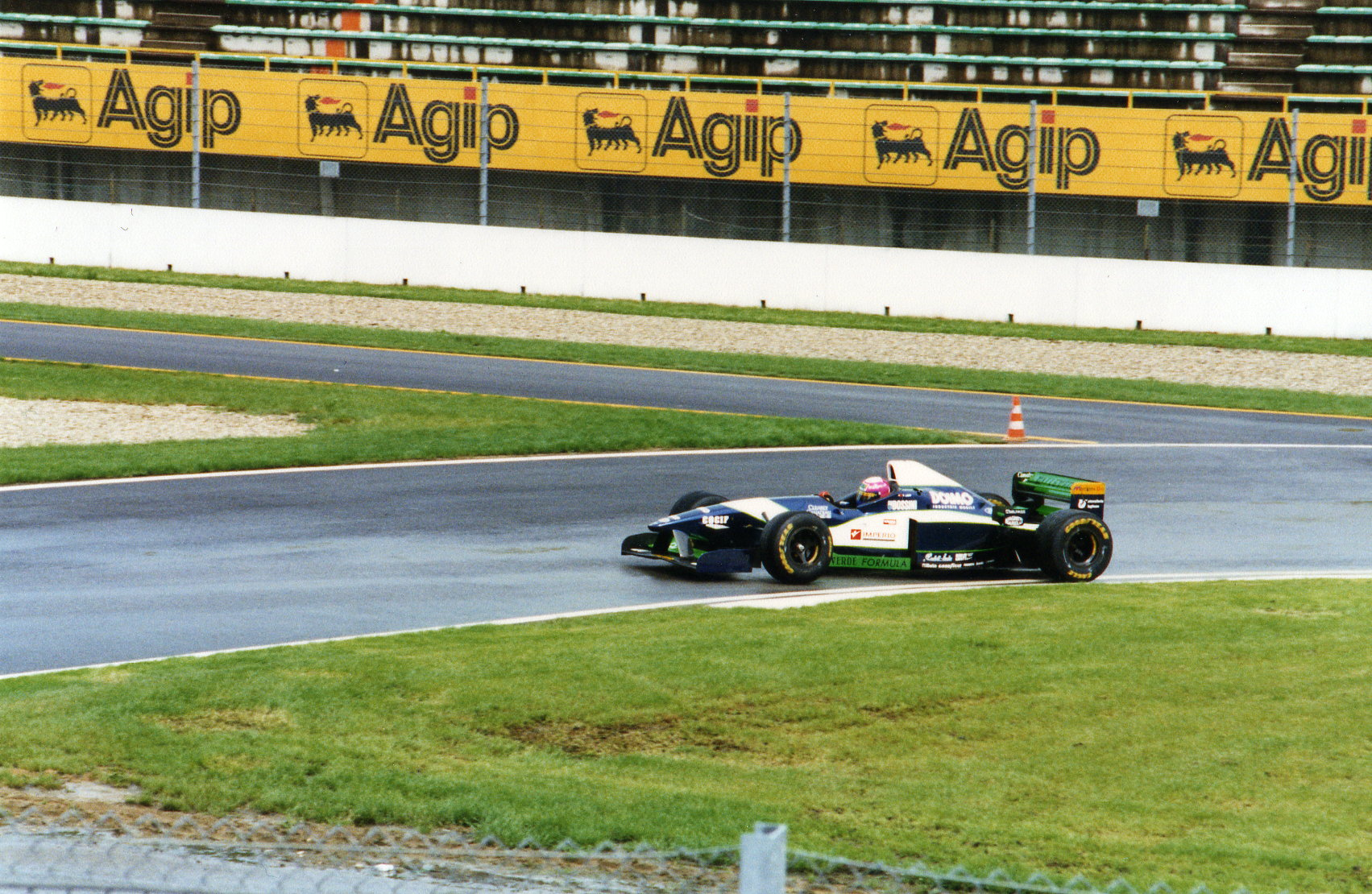
Lamy driving for Minardi at the 1996 San Marino Grand Prix

Pedro Lamy made his debut for Lotus at the 1993 Italian Grand Prix, replacing the injured Alessandro Zanardi for the final four races of the 1993 season. Ahead of the fifth race of the 1994 season, Lamy was himself injured in a testing accident at Silverstone while trialling new technical regulations set out by the Fédération Internationale de l'Automobile, Formula 1's governing body, following the deaths of Roland Ratzenberger and Ayrton Senna at the 1994 San Marino Grand Prix several weeks earlier. Lamy suffered broken legs and kneecaps in the crash and did not return until the 1995 season, when he raced for Minardi. He later became the first Portuguese driver to score a world championship point with a 6th-place finish at the 1995 Australian Grand Prix. Following a second season with Minardi in 1996, Lamy left Formula One after 32 Grands Prix to compete in sports cars.

=== Tiago Monteiro ===
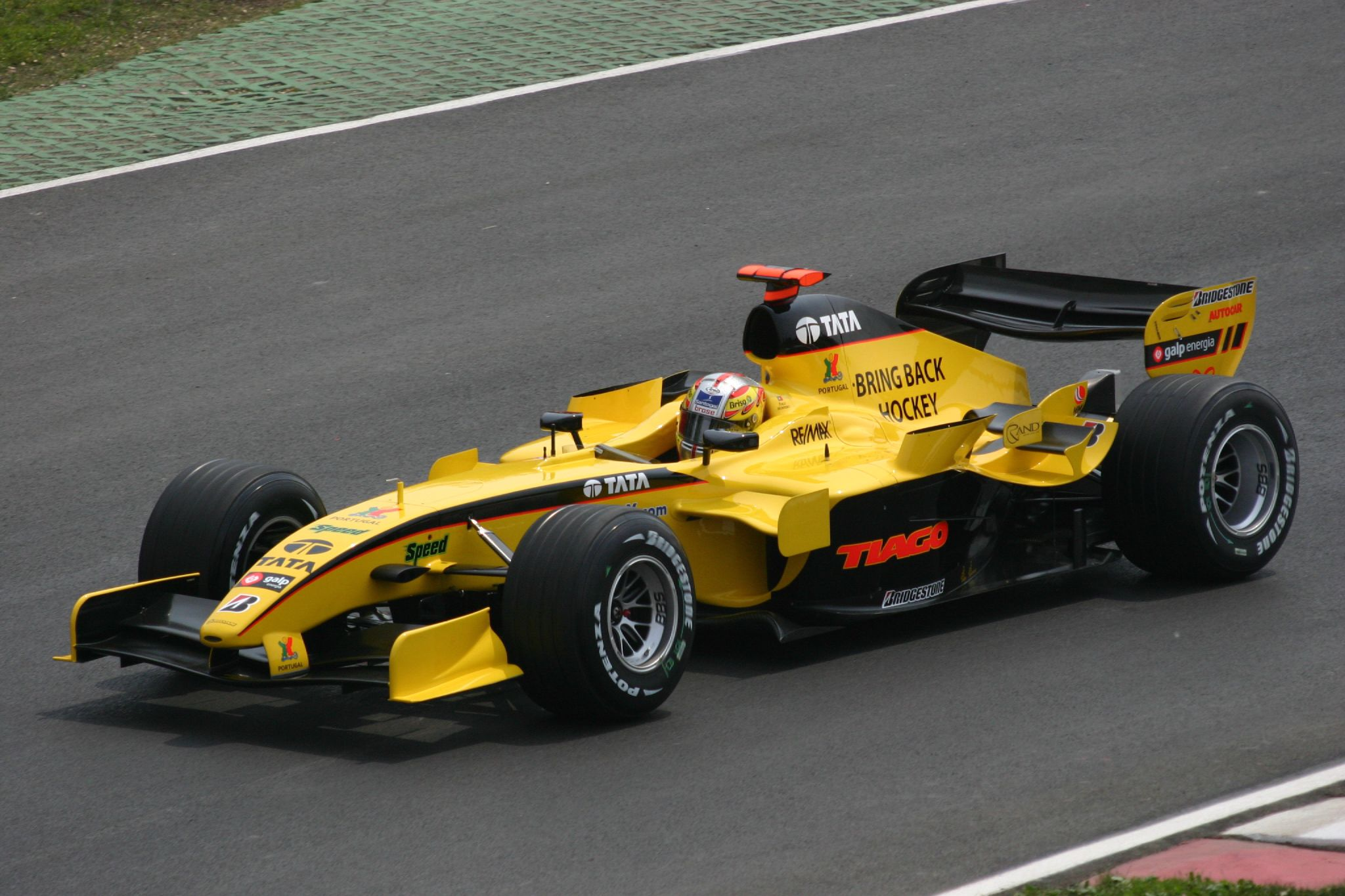
Monteiro driving for Jordan in the 2005 Canadian Grand Prix

Tiago Monteiro became the first Portuguese Formula One driver in almost a decade when he was announced alongside Narain Karthikeyan for the Jordan team ahead of the 2005 Formula One World Championship. He made his debut at the 2005 Australian Grand Prix, finishing in 16th position after starting the race from 14th on the grid. Following the withdrawal of seven teams from the 2005 United States Grand Prix over tyre safety issues, Monteiro became the first Portuguese driver to finish on the podium and the second after Pedro Lamy to score world championship points, earning six for his third-place finish. He scored an additional point with eighth position at the 2005 Belgian Grand Prix, and later ended a run of sixteen consecutive race finishes, one shy of Formula One's all-time record in one season, after retiring from the 2005 Brazilian Grand Prix. Monteiro was presented with the Rookie of the Year Award at the end-of-season Autosport Awards.

Monteiro was retained by Jordan, which was rebranded as Midland F1, for the 2006 season alongside Dutch driver Christijan Albers. He was however replaced ahead of the 2007 season by Adrian Sutil, and subsequently moved to compete in the World Touring Car Championship.

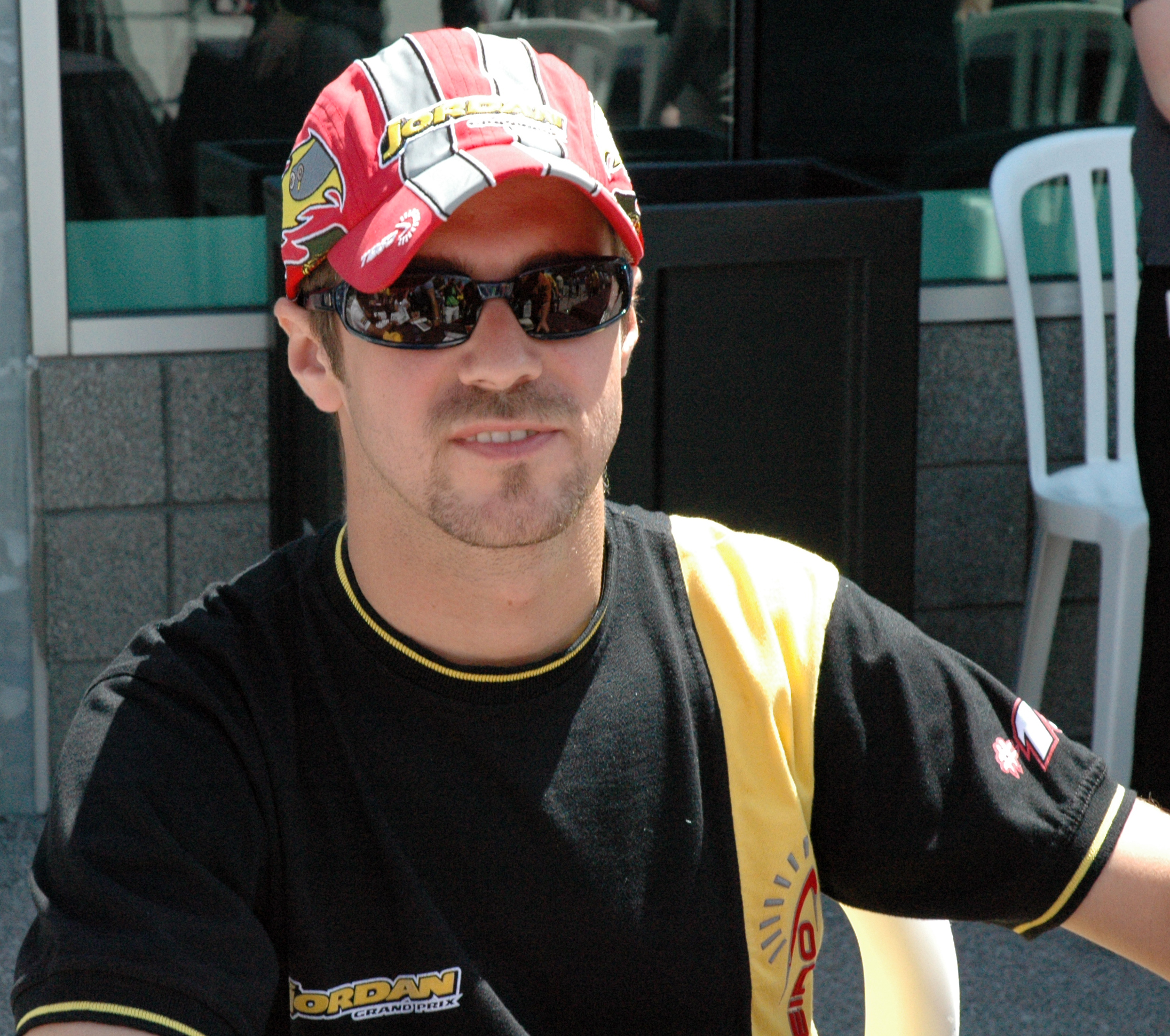
Tiago Monteiro

== Statistics ==
Drivers	Active Years	Entries	Wins	Podiums	Career Points	Poles	Fastest Laps
Casimiro de Oliveira	1958	1 (0 starts)	0	0	0	0	0
Mário de Araújo Cabral	1959–1960, 1963–1964	5 (4 starts)	0	0	0	0	0
Pedro Chaves	1991	13 (0 starts)	0	0	0	0	0
Pedro Lamy	1993–1996	32	0	0	1	0	0
Tiago Monteiro	2005–2006	37	0	1	7	0	0
