= Tiago Monteiro =

Portuguese racing driver (born 1976)

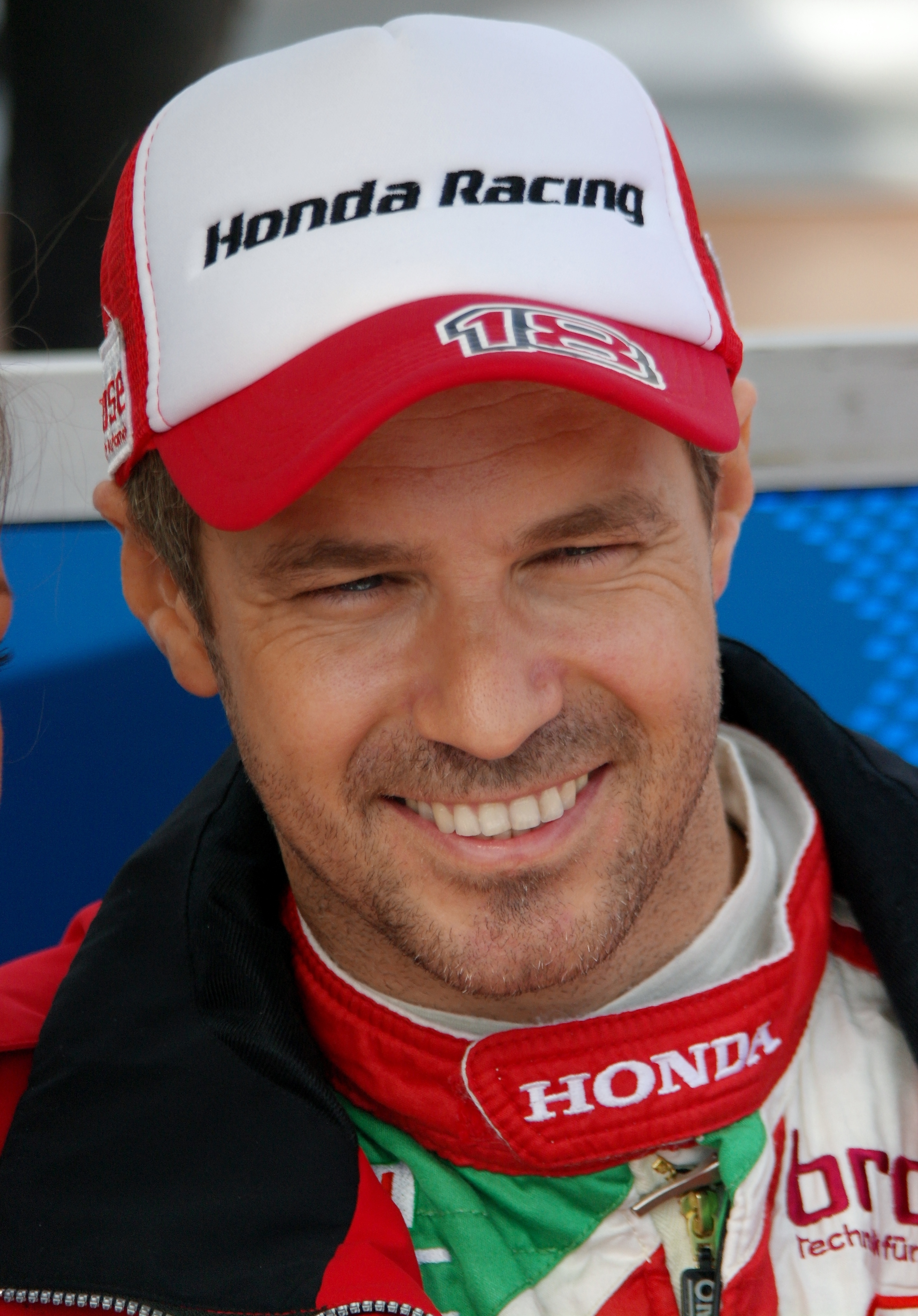
- Monteiro at the 2014 FIA WTCC Race of Belgium
- Born: Tiago Vagaroso da Costa Monteiro; 24 July 1976 (age 50); Porto, Portugal
- Spouse: Diana Pereira (m. 2008; div. 2019)
- Children: 2, including Noah

WTCC / WTCR career
- Years active: 2007–2022 (Note: The premier FIA championship for touring car racing was operated as the World Touring Car Championship between 1987 and 2017, and the World Touring Car Cup from 2018 to 2022.)
- Teams: SEAT, Sunred, Honda, Boutsen Ginion, KCMG, Münnich, Engstler
- Starts: 253
- Wins: 12
- Podiums: 45
- Poles: 11
- Fastest laps: 8
- Best finish: 3rd in 2016

Formula One World Championship career
- Nationality: (Portugal) Portuguese
- Active years: 2005–2006
- Team(s): Jordan, Midland
- Entries: 37
- Championships: 0
- Wins: 0
- Podiums: 1
- Career points: 7
- Pole positions: 0
- Fastest laps: 0
- First entry: 2005 Australian Grand Prix
- Last entry: 2006 Brazilian Grand Prix

24 Hours of Le Mans career
- Years: 1999, 2001, 2009, 2011, 2015
- Teams: Belmondo, Larbre, Oreca, OAK, ByKolles
- Best finish: 17th (1999)
- Class wins: 0

Previous series
- 2016; 2004; 2003; 2002; 1998–2001: TCR Benelux; World Series by Nissan; Champ Car; International F3000; French F3

Championship titles
- 2019, 2020: Nürburgring 24 Hours – TCR

Tiago Vagaroso da Costa Monteiro (Portuguese pronunciation: [tiˈaɣu mõˈtɐjɾu]; born 24 July 1976) is a Portuguese racing driver who competed in Formula One from 2005 to 2006, and World Touring Car from 2007 to 2022.

Born and raised in Porto, Monteiro began his racing career in 1997, winning several races in the Porsche Carrera Cup France. He advanced to French Formula Three the following year, claiming runner-up in 2000—where he finished second in the Pau Grand Prix—and 2001. After full seasons in International F3000 and Champ Car, he finished runner-up to Heikki Kovalainen in the World Series by Nissan with Carlin. A former member of the RF1 Driver Programme, Monteiro signed for Jordan in 2005, debuting in Formula One at the Australian Grand Prix alongside Narain Karthikeyan; in his rookie season, he became the first Portuguese driver to achieve a podium finish with third at the controversial United States Grand Prix. He retained his position at the re-branded Midland in 2006 with Christijan Albers, scoring zero points in the M16 with a season-best ninth in Hungary. Replaced by Adrian Sutil at Spyker, Monteiro departed Formula One with one podium and seven championship points.

Monteiro joined SEAT in the World Touring Car Championship in 2007, remaining with them until 2012 as he claimed several victories across his 2008 and 2010 campaigns. He switched to Honda late that year, helping them win the World Manufacturers' Championship in 2013 and achieving his highest championship finish of third to José María López and Yvan Muller in 2016. He led the standings after 12 races in 2017 before serious injuries sustained in a testing crash ended his season. He returned full-time to the re-branded World Touring Car Cup in 2019, where he achieved victory in his home race. He contested the final three seasons of the series before its collapse at the end of 2022. During this period, he also won the Nürburgring 24 Hours in the TCR class in 2019 and 2020.

Outside of motor racing, Monteiro owned GP2 and GP3 team Ocean Racing Technology from 2008 to 2012. He serves as the manager for António Félix da Costa, who won the Formula E World Championship in 2019–20, and his son Noah.

== Early career ==
Born in Porto, Monteiro was inspired by his father to begin racing, and drove in the 1997 French Porsche Carrera Cup. He took five wins and five pole positions to become B-class champion and rookie of the year. In 1998, he competed in the French F3 Championship, finishing 12th overall and taking the rookie of the year award. He continued in the championship in 1999, taking one win and three other podium positions to finish sixth overall. He also competed in the Le Mans 24 Hours race, finishing 17th overall and sixth in the GT2 class. In the International Renault Finals held at Estoril, Monteiro claimed the win after taking pole position and the fastest lap of the race.

In 2000, Monteiro again competed in French F3, this time finishing second in the championship after taking four wins throughout the season. He also competed in the single Formula 3 European Championship double-header race, finishing second overall with one win at Spa-Francorchamps. He also competed in a couple of one-off events, coming second in the Korea Super Prix and ninth at the famous Macau Grand Prix. In the Lamborghini Super Trophy, he achieved the fastest lap at Magny-Cours, and took pole position and the fastest lap at Laguna Seca Raceway. In 2001, Monteiro again finished second overall in the French F3 Championship after taking six pole positions, four wins and four podiums. Also competing in the French GT Championship, he managed four pole positions, two class wins and five podium finishes in the GTB class. A one-off entry in the Formula France series saw him win both races, and in the Andros Trophy, he did one fastest lap with a best finishing position of fourth.

In 2002, Monteiro stepped up to the F3000 Championship with the Super Nova team, taking five top-ten finishes on his way to 12th in the championship standings. He also completed the Renault F1 Driver Development Scheme, and had his first taste of a Formula One car, testing with the Renault team at Barcelona. In 2003, he joined Fittipaldi Dingman Racing for the Champ Car World Series, achieving a front row start in Mexico City and leading two races. He finished the year with 10 top-ten finishes, scoring 29 points to rank 15th overall in the championship. Monteiro was signed up as an official Minardi F1 test driver for the 2004 season, but also competed in the Nissan World Series with Carlin Motorsport. He was named Rookie of the Year after finishing second in the championship behind Heikki Kovalainen, and was ranked fifth in Autosport magazine's top ten drivers in the Formula One "breeding ground" championships.

Ironically, one of Monteiro's surnames, "Vagaroso", means "slow" in Portuguese.

== Formula One career ==
=== Jordan (2005) ===
After the Midland Group bought Jordan Grand Prix, Monteiro was announced as a full-time race driver alongside Indian Narain Karthikeyan for the 2005 season.

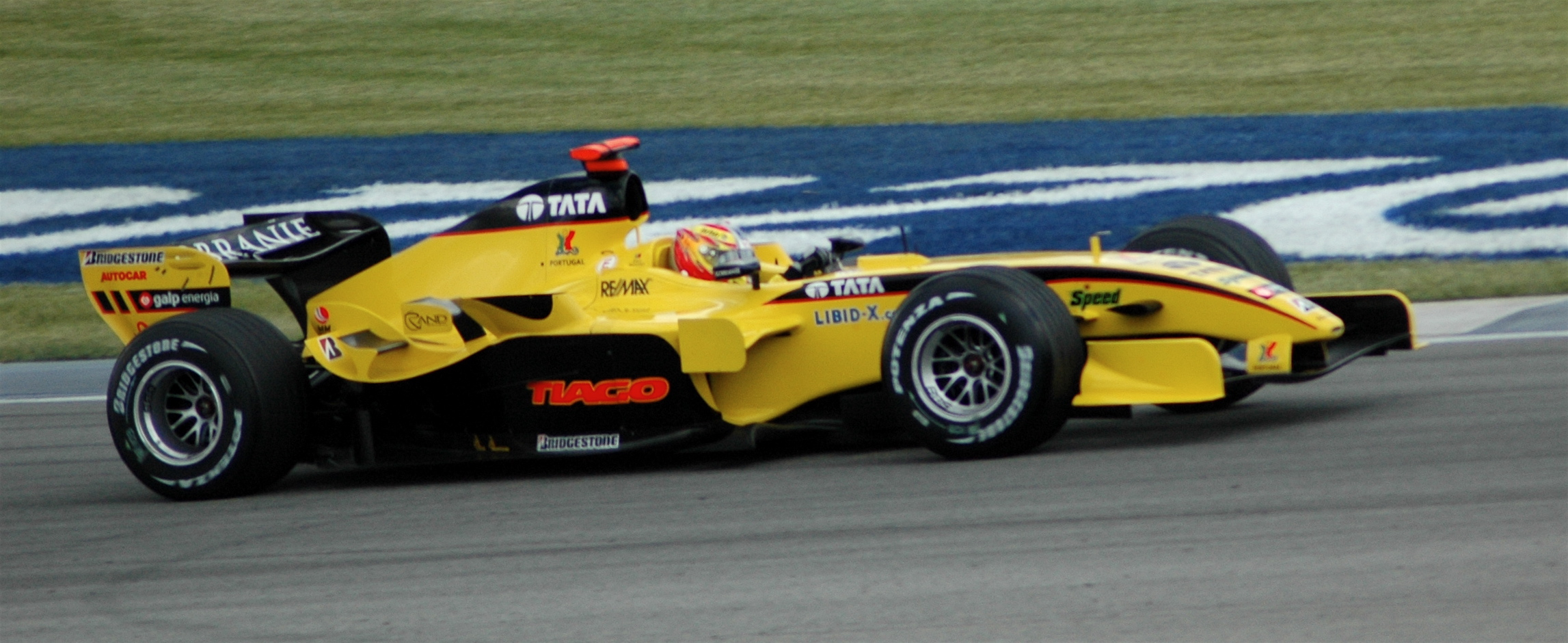
Monteiro at the controversial 2005 United States GP.

In the United States Grand Prix, Monteiro achieved his only podium finish in controversial circumstances. Due to concerns over tyre safety, the Michelin-equipped teams pulled out of the race, not taking their place on the grid, and the race was contested only by the three Bridgestone-equipped teams. Monteiro finished third out of six drivers.

At the podium ceremony, at which none of the scheduled dignitaries were present, Ferrari drivers Michael Schumacher and Rubens Barrichello quietly accepted their awards, and quickly exited. Monteiro stayed behind to celebrate his first podium finish alone. The fans in attendance, while booing the majority of the ceremony, rewarded the Portuguese driver with a round of applause.

As of the 2005 United States Grand Prix, Monteiro is currently the most successful Portuguese driver in Formula One history. Pedro Lamy had previously held this record before with one point and sixth place achieved at the 1995 Australian Grand Prix with Minardi. Also of note, as of the Belgian Grand Prix (where he also scored another point), Monteiro had finished every race of the 2005 season, breaking the record for consecutive finishes for a rookie driver in Formula One, held by Jackie Stewart (1965 season) and Olivier Panis (1994 season), who finished their first six races. This record stood until the 2013 season, when British driver Max Chilton finished all 19 races.

Shortly before the 2005 Turkish Grand Prix, Monteiro suffered a toothache that was severe enough to prevent him taking part in the race. However, his team principal Colin Kolles, a qualified dentist, performed emergency root canal surgery and Monteiro was cleared to race. He finished 15th following a collision with Juan Pablo Montoya, which resulted in the Colombian running wide on the penultimate lap and losing second place to Fernando Alonso, thus preventing Montoya's McLaren team scoring its first 1–2 finish since the 2000 Austrian Grand Prix.

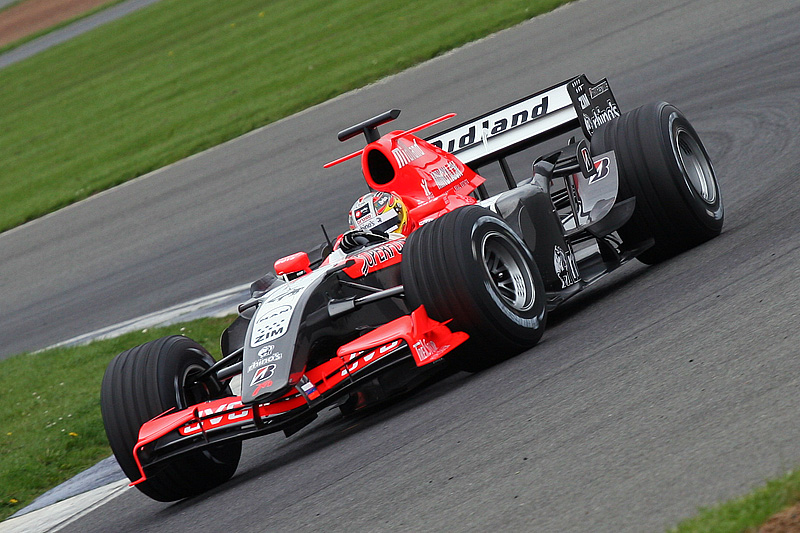
Monteiro driving the Midland M16 at Silverstone

=== Midland (2006) ===
In 2006, Midland re-signed Monteiro to partner Dutchman Christijan Albers. The two endured a largely uncompetitive season, with their M16 car failing to score a single point, and the pair were regularly outpaced during the year by Toro Rosso and occasionally Super Aguri. In the 18 races, Monteiro retired from six, with his best finish being at the wet-dry Hungarian Grand Prix where he finished ninth, just outside the points-scoring positions with Albers finishing behind in tenth.

On 21 December 2006, it was announced that Monteiro would not be driving for the newly renamed Spyker team in 2007. The highly rated German Adrian Sutil was instead signed on a multi-year contract. Monteiro had briefly held discussions about a drive for Toro Rosso, but these hopes were ended when the Faenza outfit confirmed Vitantonio Liuzzi as a driver at the launch of the STR2 car on 13 February 2007, followed by Scott Speed at a Bahrain testing session on 24 February, leaving Monteiro without a drive for the season.

== World Touring Car Championship/Cup career ==
=== SEAT (2007–2012) ===
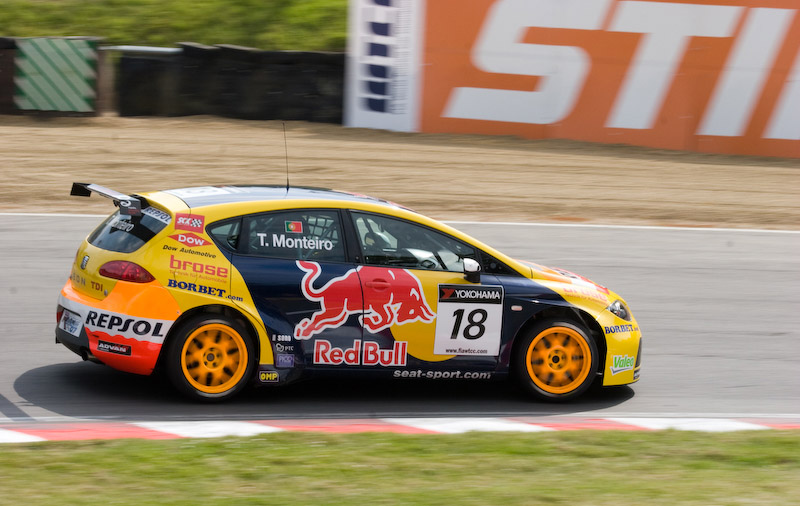
Monteiro driving the SEAT León TDI at Brands Hatch in the 2008 WTCC season

On 6 March 2007, it was announced that Monteiro would join the SEAT Sport team and would drive in the World Touring Car Championship (WTCC) with a SEAT León.

Monteiro was forced to wait until the second round of the 2007 season at Zandvoort to make his debut, as the contract was signed a few days before the season opener in Curitiba. However, he took three podium finishes and a pole position during a successful first season in which he was ranked 11th overall.

In 2008, driving the TDi version of the SEAT León, Monteiro took his first win at Puebla in Mexico, and later in the season he won the second race on home ground at Estoril in Portugal. These, other points finishes and a fastest lap during the season, saw him finish 12th overall in the final standings, which was won by SEAT team-mate Yvan Muller with the team also achieving the manufacturer's title.

Monteiro stayed with SEAT in 2009, and scored two podiums in Valencia and Brno en route to finishing ninth overall in the drivers standings, contributing to SEAT winning the manufacturers championship. On 13 January 2010, SEAT announced that it would be pulling out of the WTCC from at least the 2010 season. However, on 19 February 2010, it was announced that he would partner 2009 teammates Gabriele Tarquini and Jordi Gene along with Tom Coronel in the renamed SR-Sport team run by Sunred Engineering, which received significant funding from SEAT Sport. He achieved five podium finishes during the season, which included wins at his home event in Portimão and later in the year at Valencia. This was by far his most successful season in recent years as he finished in fifth place overall in the drivers' standings.

On 11 February 2011, it was confirmed that Monteiro would once again drive for Sunred Engineering in the forthcoming season, partnering rookies Aleksei Dudukalo and Pepe Oriola, as well as 2010 teammates Michel Nykjaer, Fredy Barth and 2009 champion Gabriele Tarquini.

Monteiro remained with the team for 2012 under the "Tuenti Racing Team" banner, where he was joined by 2011 teammate Pepe Oriola and rookie Andrea Barlesi.

=== Honda (2012–) ===
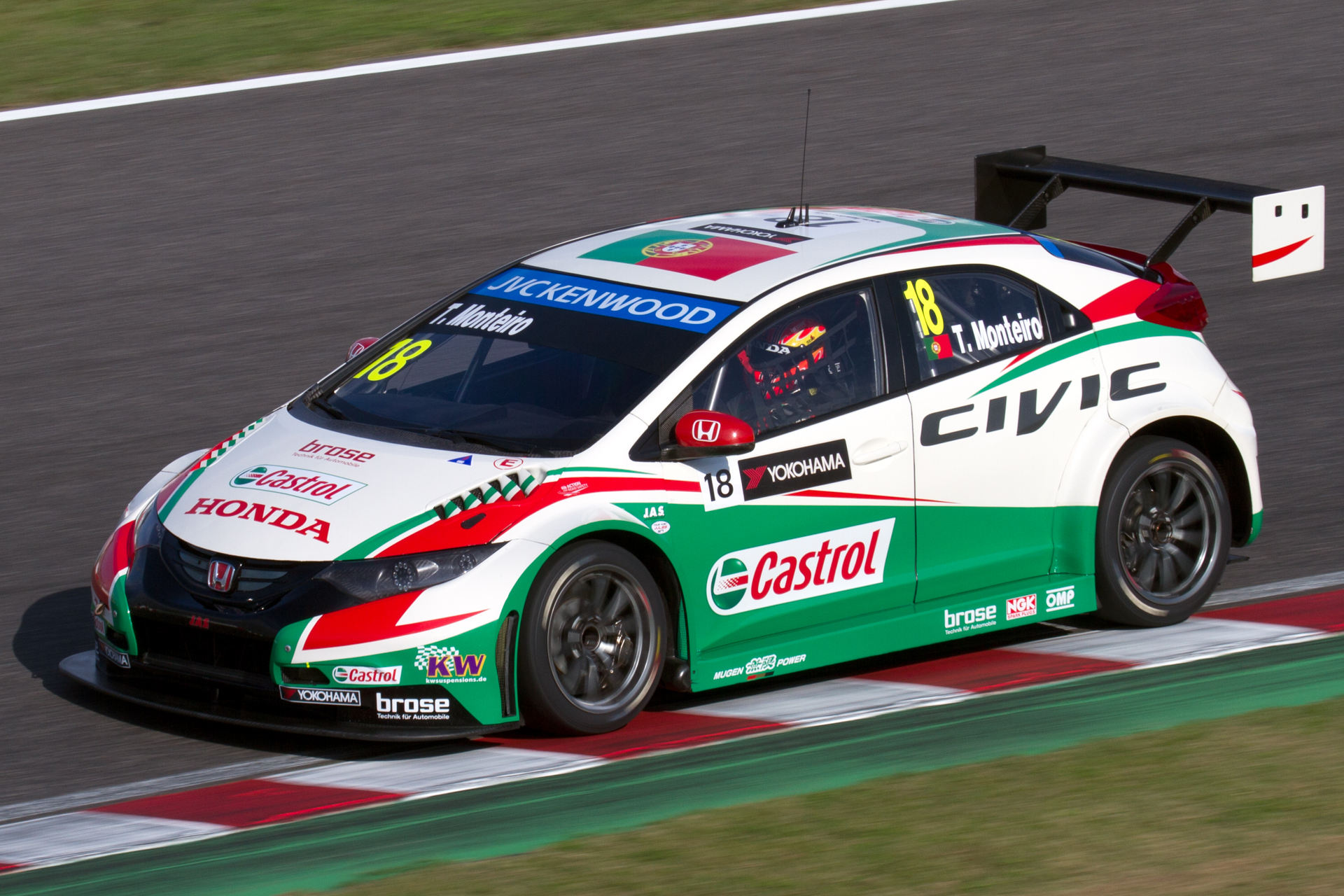
Monteiro driving the Honda Civic WTCC at the 2014 FIA WTCC Race of Japan.

Monteiro joined the Honda Racing Team JAS team from their WTCC debut at the 2012 Race of Japan, racing the new Honda Civic. He scored the first podium finish for the Honda Civic in the WTCC at the 2012 Guia Race of Macau, finishing third in race one.

For the full 2013 season, Monteiro was joined by teammate Gabriele Tarquini. Monteiro went on to take his first win with Honda at Shanghai. Additionally, he scored five further podiums that season to help Honda win the manufacturers' world championship.

For 2014, Monteiro scored five podiums and earned one pole position on his way to fifth in the final championship standings. Monteiro stayed partnered with Honda and teammate Gabriele Tarquini for 2015. He would score a dominant win in Russia and a win in Honda's home race in Japan.

In 2016, Monteiro would take wins in Slovakia and Portugal. He took five further podiums to finish third in the championship, his best result yet.

In 2017, after taking two wins and five other podium finishes, Monteiro was leading the championship comfortably after 12 races, until he sustained serious injuries in an accident caused by a brake failure at Barcelona, Spain in September during testing. Because of the injuries sustained in the crash, he couldn't participate in the remaining races of the season.

In 2018, the series became the World Touring Car Cup (WTCR), and Monteiro was due to switch from JAS Motorsport to Boutsen Ginion Racing and drive the new FK8 Honda Civic Type R TCR, but his body was not 100% recovered from his injuries to race in the first eight rounds. He would return to the sport at Suzuka, Japan in November 2018, for the penultimate round of the WTCR calendar, the same track where he made his debut for Honda in 2012 for the WTCC. He was greeted with a round of applause from fellow drivers as he was let out first to the track in Free Practice 1. Due to medical advice he didn't take part in the Season Finale at Macau.

Monteiro was set for a full season comeback in 2019 and switch teams from Boutsen Ginion Racing to KCMG, driving the Honda Civic Type R TCR. After a tough start to the season, he would take his first World Touring Car win since the accident in his home race in Portugal.

== Team ownership ==
Monteiro became interested in team ownership during 2008, and held discussions with the BCN Competición team in the GP2 Series on the subject of a possible buy-out. On 27 November he announced that he had purchased the team and renamed it "Ocean Racing Technology". The team had a successful first year in 2009, including a win in the Belgian feature race with Portuguese driver Alvaro Parente. The team also competed in the GP2 Asia Series at the end of the year and the GP3 Series. In the winter of 2012–13, the team withdrew from GP2 and GP3 due to a lack of funding.

== Driver management ==
Monteiro manages the career of fellow Portuguese racing driver António Félix da Costa.

== V8 Supercars ==
On 23 April 2010, it was announced that Monteiro would compete as a "guest" driver in the Gold Coast 600 round of the V8 Supercar Championship Series in Surfers Paradise from 22–24 October 2010. He shared a Holden VE Commodore with Tony D'Alberto, with the car being set up by the Tony D'Alberto Racing team under the Centaur Racing banner. The pair recorded a DNF and a 17th-place finish in their two races.

== Personal life ==
On 16 August 2008, Monteiro married the Portuguese model Diana Pereira. The couple have a daughter, Mel (born in February 2008) and a son, Noah (2009), who is also a racing driver. After more than a decade together, the couple divorced in 2019. Monteiro is now dating Alexandra Carvalho since 2020.

== Racing record ==
=== Career summary ===
Season	Series	Team	Races	Wins	Poles	F/Laps	Podiums	Points	Position
1998	French Formula 3 Championship	Signature Compétition	12	0	0	0	0	31	12th
1998	British Formula 3 Championship	Signature Compétition	1	0	0	0	0	0	28th
1998	Macau Grand Prix	Signature Compétition	1	0	0	0	0	—N/a	NC
1999	French Formula 3 Championship	ASM	16	1	1	2	4	149	6th
1999	British Formula 3 Championship	ASM	1	0	0	0	0	4	19th
1999	Macau Grand Prix	ASM	1	0	0	0	0	—N/a	NC
1999	Masters of Formula 3	ASM	1	0	0	0	0	—N/a	29th
1999	Korea Super Prix	ASM	1	0	0	0	0	—N/a	6th
1999	24 Hours of Le Mans – GTS	Paul Belmondo Racing	1	0	0	0	0	—N/a	6th
2000	French Formula 3 Championship	ASM	12	3	2	2	5	133	**2nd**
2000	British Formula 3 Championship	ASM	1	1	0	0	1	—N/a	NC†
2000	European Formula 3 Cup	ASM	1	0	0	0	1	—N/a	**2nd**
2000	Macau Grand Prix	ASM	1	0	0	0	0	—N/a	9th
2000	Masters of Formula 3	ASM	1	0	0	0	0	—N/a	11th
2000	Korea Super Prix	ASM	1	0	0	0	1	—N/a	**2nd**
2001	French Formula 3 Championship	ASM	11	4	5	4	7	171	**2nd**
2001	European Formula 3 Cup	ASM	1	0	0	0	0	—N/a	NC
2001	Macau Grand Prix	ASM	1	0	0	0	0	—N/a	13th
2001	Masters of Formula 3	ASM	1	0	0	0	0	—N/a	5th
2001	Korea Super Prix	ASM	1	0	0	0	0	—N/a	19th
2001	24 Hours of Le Mans – GTS	Larbre Compétition	1	0	0	0	0	—N/a	4th
2002	International Formula 3000	Super Nova Racing	12	0	0	0	0	2	13th
2003	CART World Series	Fittipaldi-Dingman Racing	18	0	0	0	0	29	15th
2004	World Series by Nissan	Carlin Motorsport	18	5	4	2	9	135	**2nd**
2004	Formula One	Minardi Cosworth	Test driver						
2005	Formula One	Jordan Grand Prix	19	0	0	0	1	7	16th
2006	Formula One	MF1 Racing/Spyker MF1 Racing	18	0	0	0	0	0	21st
2007	World Touring Car Championship	SEAT Sport	20	0	1	0	3	38	11th
2008	World Touring Car Championship	SEAT Sport	24	2	0	2	2	43	12th
2009	World Touring Car Championship	SEAT Sport	24	0	0	1	2	44	9th
2009	24 Hours of Le Mans	Team Oreca-Matmut AIM	1	0	0	0	3	—N/a	DNF
2010	World Touring Car Championship	SR-Sport	22	2	1	1	5	177	5th
2010	V8 Supercar Championship Series	Centaur Racing	2	0	0	0	0	—N/a	NC†
2011	World Touring Car Championship	Sunred Engineering	24	0	0	0	3	117	6th
2011	24 Hours of Le Mans	OAK Racing	1	0	0	0	3	—N/a	DNF
2012	World Touring Car Championship	Tuenti Racing Team	18	0	0	0	0	98	9th
2012	World Touring Car Championship	Honda Racing Team JAS	6	0	0	0	1	98	9th
2013	World Touring Car Championship	Castrol Honda World Touring Car Team	23	1	0	2	5	164	8th
2014	World Touring Car Championship	Castrol Honda World Touring Car Team	23	0	1	1	5	186	5th
2015	World Touring Car Championship	Honda Racing Team JAS	24	2	0	1	4	177	7th
2015	FIA World Endurance Championship	Team ByKolles	1	0	0	0	0	0	34th
2015	24 Hours of Le Mans	Team ByKolles	1	0	0	0	0	—N/a	EX
2016	World Touring Car Championship	Castrol Honda World Touring Car Team	22	2	1	0	7	214	**3rd**
2016	TCR Benelux Touring Car Championship	Boutsen Ginion Racing	6	2	3	0	3	121	12th
2016	TCR International Series	WestCoast Racing	2	1	0	0	2	23	16th
2017	World Touring Car Championship	Honda Racing Team JAS	12	2	1	0	7	200	8th
2017	International GT Open	BMW Team Teo Martín	2	0	0	0	0	6	32nd
2018	World Touring Car Cup	Boutsen Ginion Racing	3	0	0	0	0	0	32nd
2019	World Touring Car Cup	KCMG	30	1	1	0	2	109	20th
2019	24 Hours of Nürburgring – TCR	Team Castrol Honda Racing	1	1	0	0	1	—N/a	**1st**
2020	World Touring Car Cup	ALL-INKL.DE Münnich Motorsport	16	0	0	1	1	79	15th
2020	24 Hours of Nürburgring – TCR	Team Castrol Honda Racing	1	1	0	0	1	—N/a	**1st**
2021	World Touring Car Cup	ALL-INKL.DE Münnich Motorsport	14	1	0	0	1	75	17th
2021	24 Hours of Nürburgring – TCR	Team Castrol Honda Racing	1	0	0	0	1	—N/a	**3rd**
2022	World Touring Car Cup	Liqui Moly Team Engstler	16	0	0	0	0	70	15th
2022	Michelin Pilot Challenge – TCR	LA Honda World Racing	1	0	1	0	0	160	36th
2024	Nürburgring Langstrecken-Serie – Cup2	Max Kruse Racing							
2024	24 Hours of Nürburgring – Cup2	Max Kruse Racing							
2025	Ultimate GT Endurance Cup – Porsche Cup	Driv'n							
2025	Nürburgring Langstrecken-Serie - TCR	ALM Motorsport							

^{†} As Monteiro was a guest driver, he was ineligible for championship points.
* Season still in progress.

=== Complete French Formula Three Championship results ===
(key) (Races in bold indicate pole position) (Races in italics indicate fastest lap)

Year	Entrant	Chassis	Engine	1	2	3	4	5	6	7	8	9	10	11	12	13	14	15	16	17	18	19	20	21	22	DC	Points
1998	Signature Plus	Dallara F396	Fiat	NIM; 1 Ret	NIM; 2; 15	NOG; 1; 17	NOG; 2; 14	NOG; 1; 12	NOG; 2; 12	MAG; 1; 25	MAG; 2 Ret	DIJ; 1 Ret	DIJ; 2; 9	PAU; 1 Ret	PAU; 2; 14	CHA; 1 Ret	CHA; 2; 9	VDV; 1; 9	VDV; 2; 9	LEC; 1; 4	LEC; 2; 7	ALB; 1; 8	ALB; 2; 4	LMS; 1; 13	LMS; 2 DNS	12th	31
1999	ASM	Dallara F399	Renault	NOG; 1; 7	NOG; 2; 5	LÉD; 1; 4	LÉD; 2; 10	PAU; 1 Ret	PAU; 2 Ret	DIJ; 1; 4	DIJ; 2; 3	CHA; 1; 7	CHA; 2; 5	**ALB**; **1**; 2	ALB; 2; 1	NIM; 1 Ret	NIM; 2; 9	MAG; 1; 3	MAG; 2; 4	VDV; 1 Ret	VDV; 2 Ret					6th	149
2000	ASM	Dallara F399	Renault	NOG; 1 Ret	NOG; 2; 5	LÉD; 1 DNS	LÉD; 2; 10	PAU; 2	VDV; 1; 4	VDV; 2; 2	**SPA**; **1** Ret	SPA; 2; 8	**ALB**; 1	LMS; 1	NIM; 1											2nd	133
2001	ASM	Dallara F399	Renault	**NOG**; **1**; 1	NOG; 2; 7	LÉD; 3	MAG; 2	**VDV**; 1	SPA; 1; 3	SPA; 2; 4	**CRT**; 1	**ALB**; 1	LMS; 6	**MAG**; 4												2nd	171

=== 24 Hours of Le Mans results ===
Year	Team	Co-drivers	Car	Class	Laps	Pos.	Class pos.
1999	(France) Paul Belmondo Racing	(France) Paul Belmondo (France) Marc Rostan	Chrysler Viper GTS-R	GTS	299	17th	6th
2001	(France) Larbre Compétition	(France) Christophe Bouchut (France) Jean-Philippe Belloc	Chrysler Viper GTS-R	GTS	234	20th	4th
2009	(France) Team Oreca-Matmut AIM	(Monaco) Stéphane Ortelli (Brazil) Bruno Senna	Oreca 01-AIM	LMP1	219	DNF	DNF
2011	(France) OAK Racing	(France) Guillaume Moreau (France) Pierre Ragues	OAK Pescarolo 01 Evo-Judd	LMP1	80	DNF	DNF
2015	(Austria) Team ByKolles	(Switzerland) Simon Trummer (Germany) Pierre Kaffer	CLM P1/01-AER	LMP1	260	EX	EX

=== Complete International Formula 3000 results ===
(key) (Races in bold indicate pole position) (Races in italics indicate fastest lap)

Year	Entrant	1	2	3	4	5	6	7	8	9	10	11	12	DC	Points
2002	Super Nova Racing	INT; 9	IMO; 10	CAT; Ret	A1R; 16	MON; Ret	NÜR; Ret	SIL; 13	MAG; 9	HOC; 5	HUN; 13	SPA; Ret	MNZ; 10	13th	2

=== Complete CART results ===
(key)

Year	Team	No.	Chassis	Engine	1	2	3	4	5	6	7	8	9	10	11	12	13	14	15	16	17	18	19	Rank	Points	Ref
2003	Fittipaldi-Dingman Racing	7	Reynard 02i	Ford XFE V8t	STP; 7	MTY; 19	LBH; 11	BRH; 14	LAU; 13	MIL; 10	LS; 9	POR; 19	CLE; Wth	TOR; 10	VAN; 15	ROA; 17	MDO; 11	MTL; 18	DEN; 13	MIA; 15	MXC; 6	SRF; 18	FON; NH	15th	29	

=== Complete World Series by Nissan results ===
(key)

Year	Entrant	1	2	3	4	5	6	7	8	9	10	11	12	13	14	15	16	17	18	DC	Points
2004	Carlin Motorsport	JAR; 1; 2	JAR; 2; 6	**ZOL**; **1**; 1	ZOL; 2; 1	MAG; 1; 8	MAG; 2; 5	VAL; 1; 13	VAL; 2; 7	LAU; 1; 4	LAU; 2; 5	**EST**; **1**; 2	**EST**; **2**; 1	CAT; 1; 10	CAT; 2; 7	VAL; 1; 3	**VAL**; **2**; 1	JER; 1; 2	JER; 2; 1	2nd	154

=== Complete Formula One results ===
(key)

Year	Entrant	Chassis	Engine	1	2	3	4	5	6	7	8	9	10	11	12	13	14	15	16	17	18	19	WDC	Points
2005	Jordan Grand Prix	Jordan EJ15	Toyota RVX-05 3.0 V10	AUS; 16	MAL; 12	BHR; 10	SMR; 13	ESP; 12	MON; 13	EUR; 15	CAN; 10	USA; 3	FRA; 13	GBR; 17	GER; 17	HUN; 13	TUR; 15						16th	7
2005	Jordan Grand Prix	Jordan EJ15B	Toyota RVX-05 3.0 V10															ITA; 17	BEL; 8	BRA; Ret	JPN; 13	CHN; 11	16th	7
2006	Midland F1 Racing	Midland M16	Toyota RVX-06 2.4 V8	BHR; 17	MAL; 13	AUS; Ret	SMR; 16	EUR; 12	ESP; 16	MON; 15	GBR; 16	CAN; 14	USA; Ret	FRA; Ret	GER; DSQ	HUN; 9	TUR; Ret	ITA; Ret					21st	0
2006	Spyker MF1 Racing	Spyker M16	Toyota RVX-06 2.4 V8																CHN; Ret	JPN; 16	BRA; 15		21st	0

=== Complete World Touring Car Championship results ===
(key) (Races in bold indicate pole position) (Races in italics indicate fastest lap)

Year	Team	Car	1	2	3	4	5	6	7	8	9	10	11	12	13	14	15	16	17	18	19	20	21	22	23	24	DC	Points
2007	SEAT Sport	SEAT León	BRA; 1	BRA; 2	NED; 1; 4	NED; 2; 9	ESP; 1 Ret	ESP; 2; 12	FRA; 1; 3	FRA; 2; 3	CZE; 1; 13	CZE; 2; 9	POR; 1; 15	POR; 2; 13	**SWE**; **1**; 2	SWE; 2; 6	GER; 1; 10	GER; 2; 8	GBR; 1; 21	GBR; 2; 11	ITA; 1 Ret	ITA; 2; 8	MAC; 1; 6	MAC; 2; 4			11th	38
2008	SEAT Sport	SEAT León TDI	BRA; 1; 17	BRA; 2; 13	MEX; 1; 7	MEX; 2; 1	ESP; 1; 18	ESP; 2 Ret	FRA; 1; 13	FRA; 2; 10	CZE; 1; 12	CZE; 2; 10	POR; 1; 7	POR; 2; 1	GBR; 1; 16	GBR; 2; 15	GER; 1; 4	GER; 2 Ret	EUR; 1; 13	EUR; 2; 11	ITA; 1; 4	ITA; 2; 6	JPN; 1; 5	JPN; 2; 7	MAC; 1; 11	MAC; 2 Ret	12th	43
2009	SEAT Sport	SEAT León TDI	BRA; 1; 16	BRA; 2; 12	MEX; 1; 11	MEX; 2 Ret	MAR; 1; 5	MAR; 2 DSQ	FRA; 1; 14	FRA; 2; 11	ESP; 1; 2	ESP; 2; 8	CZE; 1; 6	CZE; 2; 3	POR; 1; 4	POR; 2; 5	GBR; 1; 7	GBR; 2; 8	GER; 1; 19	GER; 2; 12	ITA; 1 Ret	ITA; 2; 23	JPN; 1; 7	JPN; 2 Ret	MAC; 1; 6	MAC; 2; 4	9th	44
2010	SR-Sport	SEAT León TDI	BRA; 1; 11	BRA; 2; 7	MAR; 1; 3	MAR; 2; 4	ITA; 1; 9	ITA; 2; 7	BEL; 1; 4	BEL; 2; 3	**POR**; **1**; 1	POR; 2; 7	GBR; 1; 8	GBR; 2 Ret	CZE; 1; 9	CZE; 2; 6	GER; 1; 5	GER; 2; 15	ESP; 1; 6	ESP; 2; 1	JPN; 1 Ret	JPN; 2 Ret	MAC; 1; 3	MAC; 2; 8			5th	177
2011	SUNRED Engineering	SEAT León 2.0 TDI	BRA; 1; 11	BRA; 2; 7	BEL; 1; 5	BEL; 2; 3	ITA; 1; 3	**ITA**; **2**; 4	HUN; 1; 7	HUN; 2; 5																	6th	117
2011	SUNRED Engineering	SUNRED SR León 1.6T									CZE; 1; 12	CZE; 2; 12	POR; 1; 4	POR; 2; 3	GBR; 1 Ret	GBR; 2 Ret	GER; 1 Ret	GER; 2; 8	ESP; 1; 8	ESP; 2 Ret	JPN; 1 Ret	JPN; 2 DNS	CHN; 1; 8	CHN; 2 Ret	MAC; 1; 12	MAC; 2; 8	6th	117
2012	Tuenti Racing Team	SEAT León 2.0 TDI	ITA; 1 Ret	ITA; 2; 18†																							9th	95
2012	Tuenti Racing Team	SUNRED SR León 1.6T			ESP; 1; 9	ESP; 2; 13	MAR; 1 NC	MAR; 2; 9	SVK; 1 Ret	SVK; 2 Ret	HUN; 1; 5	HUN; 2; 5	AUT; 1; 5	AUT; 2 Ret	POR; 1; 7	POR; 2; 8	BRA; 1 Ret	BRA; 2; 9	USA; 1; 6	USA; 2; 6							9th	95
2012	Honda Racing Team JAS	Honda Civic S2000 TC																			JPN; 1; 9	JPN; 2; 10	CHN; 1; 13	CHN; 2; 10	MAC; 1; 3	MAC; 2; 4	9th	95
2013	Castrol Honda World Touring Car Team	Honda Civic WTCC	ITA; 1; 5	ITA; 2; 8	MAR; 1 Ret	MAR; 2 DNS	SVK; 1; 2	SVK; 2; 5	HUN; 1 Ret	HUN; 2; 13	AUT; 1; 13	AUT; 2; 4	RUS; 1; 12	RUS; 2; 12	POR; 1; 9	POR; 2; 11	ARG; 1; 10	ARG; 2; 6	USA; 1; 2	USA; 2; 5	JPN; 1; 28†	JPN; 2; 3	CHN; 1; 11	**CHN**; **2**; 1	MAC; 1; 2	MAC; 2 Ret	8th	164
2014	Castrol Honda World Touring Car Team	Honda Civic WTCC	MAR; 1; 5	MAR; 2; 10†	FRA; 1; 8	FRA; 2; 3	HUN; 1; 3	HUN; 2; 2	SVK; 1; 7	**SVK**; **2** C	AUT; 1; 5	AUT; 2; 3	RUS; 1; 7	RUS; 2 Ret	BEL; 1; 6	BEL; 2; 4	ARG; 1; 5	ARG; 2; 5	BEI; 1 Ret	BEI; 2; 13	CHN; 1; 7	CHN; 2; 2	JPN; 1; 9	JPN; 2; 9	MAC; 1; 4	MAC; 2; 16†	5th	186
2015	Honda Racing Team JAS	Honda Civic WTCC	ARG; 1; 4	ARG; 2; 3	MAR; 1; 6	MAR; 2 Ret	HUN; 1; 5	HUN; 2; 4	GER; 1 Ret	**GER**; **2**; 3	RUS; 1; 8	**RUS**; **2**; 1	SVK; 1; 8	SVK; 2; 9	FRA; 1; 7	FRA; 2 Ret	POR; 1; 5	POR; 2 Ret	JPN; 1; 9	JPN; 2; 1	CHN; 1; 7	CHN; 2; 6	THA; 1; 7	THA; 2 DSQ	QAT; 1; 8	QAT; 2; 9	7th	177
2016	Castrol Honda World Touring Car Team	Honda Civic WTCC	FRA; 1; 4	FRA; 2; 2	SVK; 1; 1	SVK; 2; 2	HUN; 1; 11	HUN; 2; 3	MAR; 1 DSQ	MAR; 2 DSQ	**GER**; **1** Ret	GER; 2 DNS	**RUS**; **1**; 6	RUS; 2; 5	POR; 1; 10	**POR**; **2**; 1	ARG; 1; 4	ARG; 2; 4	JPN; 1; 3	JPN; 2; 3	CHN; 1; 10	CHN; 2; 8	QAT; 1 Ret	QAT; 2; 5			3rd	214
2017	Castrol Honda World Touring Car Team	Honda Civic WTCC	MAR; 1; 6	**MAR**; **2**; 1	ITA; 1; 3	ITA; 2; 2	HUN; 1; 1	HUN; 2; 5	GER; 1; 15	GER; 2; 13	POR; 1; 2	POR; 2; 3	ARG; 1; 5	ARG; 2; 2	CHN; 1	CHN; 2	JPN; 1	JPN; 2	MAC; 1	MAC; 2	QAT; 1	QAT; 2					8th	200

^{†} Driver did not finish the race, but was classified as he completed over 90% of the race distance.

=== Complete World Touring Car Cup results ===
(key) (Races in bold indicate pole position) (Races in italics indicate fastest lap)

Year	Team	Car	1	2	3	4	5	6	7	8	9	10	11	12	13	14	15	16	17	18	19	20	21	22	23	24	25	26	27	28	29	30	DC	Points
2018	Boutsen Ginion Racing	Honda Civic Type R TCR	MAR; 1	MAR; 2	MAR; 3	HUN; 1	HUN; 2	HUN; 3	GER; 1	GER; 2	GER; 3	NED; 1	NED; 2	NED; 3	POR; 1	POR; 2	POR; 3	SVK; 1	SVK; 2	SVK; 3	CHN; 1	CHN; 2	CHN; 3	WUH; 1	WUH; 2	WUH; 3	JPN; 1; 15	JPN; 2; 15	JPN; 3; 11	MAC; 1	MAC; 2	MAC; 3	32nd	0
2019	KCMG	Honda Civic Type R TCR	MAR; 1; 6	MAR; 2; 8	MAR; 3 Ret	HUN; 1; 18	HUN; 2 Ret	HUN; 3; 16	SVK; 1; 17	SVK; 2; 16	SVK; 3; 17	NED; 1; 19	NED; 2; 23	NED; 3; 19	GER; 1; 16	GER; 2; 14	GER; 3; 17	POR; 1; 21	POR; 2; 10	POR; 3; 1	CHN; 1; 21	CHN; 2 Ret	CHN; 3 Ret	**JPN**; **1**; 3	JPN; 2; 6	JPN; 3; 15	MAC; 1; 15	MAC; 2; 18	MAC; 3; 19	MAL; 1 Ret	MAL; 2; 12	MAL; 3; 6	20th	109
2020	ALL-INKL.DE Münnich Motorsport	Honda Civic Type R TCR	BEL; 1 Ret	BEL; 2; 19	GER; 1; 8	GER; 2; 9	SVK; 1; 13	SVK; 2; 9	SVK; 3; 17†	HUN; 1; 14	HUN; 2; 9	HUN; 3; 2	ESP; 1; 14	ESP; 2; 12	ESP; 3 Ret	ARA; 1; 20†	ARA; 2; 10	ARA; 3; 11															15th	79
2021	ALL-INKL.DE Münnich Motorsport	Honda Civic Type R TCR	GER; 1; 1	GER; 2; 8	POR; 1; 4	POR; 2; 18	ESP; 1; 20	ESP; 2; 14	HUN; 1; 10	HUN; 2; 11	CZE; 1; 16	CZE; 2; 12	FRA; 1 Ret	FRA; 2; 12	ITA; 1; 17	ITA; 2; 15	RUS; 1 WD	RUS; 2 WD															17th	75
2022	Engstler Honda Type R Liqui Moly Racing Team	Honda Civic Type R TCR	FRA; 1; 15	FRA; 2; 10	GER; 1 C	GER; 2 C	HUN; 1; 16	HUN; 2; 15	ESP; 1; 14	ESP; 2; 15	POR; 1; 11	POR; 2 Ret	ITA; 1; 11	ITA; 2; 11	ALS; 1; 9	ALS; 2; 6	BHR; 1; 12	BHR; 2; 12	SAU; 1; 13	SAU; 2; 9													15th	70

^{†} Driver did not finish the race, but was classified as he completed over 90% of the race distance.

=== 24 Hours of Nürburgring results ===
Year	Team	Co-drivers	Car	Class	Laps	Pos.	Class pos.
2019	Team Castrol Honda Racing	(Germany) Dominik Fugel (Germany) Markus Oestreich (Germany) Cedrik Totz	Honda Civic Type R TCR (FK8)	TCR	138	38th	**1st**
2020	Team Castrol Honda Racing	(Argentina) Esteban Guerrieri (Germany) Dominik Fugel (Germany) Markus Oestreich	Honda Civic Type R TCR (FK8)	TCR	78	20th	**1st**
2021	Team Castrol Honda Racing	(Germany) Dominik Fugel (Argentina) Néstor Girolami (Germany) Cedrik Totz	Honda Civic Type R TCR (FK8)	TCR	53	43rd	**3rd**

== Notes ==
Awards and achievements
Preceded by A. J. Allmendinger	Autosport; Rookie of the Year; 2005	Succeeded by Lewis Hamilton
