= Midland M16 =

Formula One racing car

Midland M16 Spyker M16
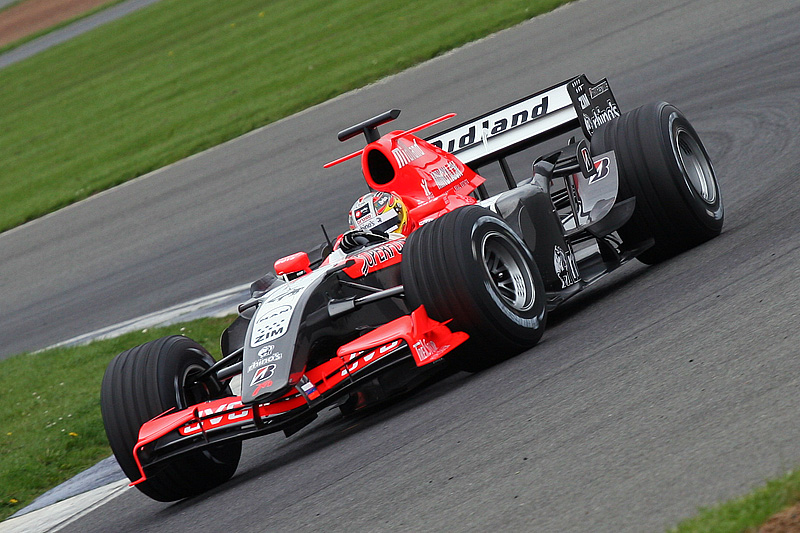
- Tiago Monteiro driving the M16 at the 2006 San Marino Grand Prix
- Category: Formula One
- Constructor: Midland F1 Racing
- Designers: James Key (Technical Director); John McQuilliam (Chief Designer); Mike Wroe (Head of Electronics); Simon Phillips (Head of Aerodynamics)
- Predecessor: Jordan EJ15B
- Successor: Spyker F8-VII

Technical specifications
- Chassis: Carbon-fibre composite monocoque
- Suspension (front): Composite pushrods activating chassis-mounted in-line dampers and torsion bars, unequal length composite aerodynamic wishbones, front anti-roll bar and cast uprights
- Suspension (rear): as front
- Length: 4,610 mm (181 in)
- Width: 1,800 mm (71 in)
- Height: 1,000 mm (39 in)
- Engine: Toyota RVX-06 2.4 L (146 cu in) V8 (90°). Naturally-aspirated, mid-mounted.
- Transmission: Midland with Toyota internals 7 forward speeds + 1 reverse semi-automatic
- Weight: 600 kg (1,323 lb) (including driver and camera)
- Fuel: Esso
- Lubricants: Esso
- Tyres: Bridgestone; BBS wheels (front and rear)

Competition history
- Notable entrants: (Russia) Midland F1 Racing (Rounds 1-15) (Netherlands) Spyker MF1 Racing (Rounds 16-18)
- Notable drivers: 18. (Portugal) Tiago Monteiro; 19. (Netherlands) Christijan Albers
- Debut: 2006 Bahrain Grand Prix
- Last event: 2006 Brazilian Grand Prix
Races	Wins	Podiums	Poles	F/Laps
18	0	0	0	0
- Constructors' Championships: 0
- Drivers' Championships: 0

The Midland M16, subsequently known as the Spyker M16, was the car with which the Midland team competed in the 2006 Formula One season. It was driven by Tiago Monteiro, who had driven for the team in 2005 during its Jordan guise, and Christijan Albers, who moved from Minardi.

== Background ==
=== Development and design ===
Although Eddie Jordan had sold his team prior to the start of the 2005 season, 2006 marked the first year for the team under the Midland banner. Originally, Dallara were going to build the Midland car for 2006, however this did not materialise with the team utilising their wind-tunnel but building the chassis themselves in the UK. The M16 was launched on February 3rd, marking the first time a Russian manufacturer had entered Formula One. The car undertook a shakedown test at Silverstone the following day, before the four day Jerez test which began on February 7th. James Key was appointed Technical Director, along with Adrian Sutil, Markus Winkelhock and Roman Rusinov as test drivers. Engines for the M16 were purchased from Toyota, and Key noted significant aerodynamic improvements - especially around the rear of the car - from the previous seasons EJ15B.

=== Testing ===
During the early tests, the M16 posted strong reliability, however it was noted the car had some unique handling characteristics for the drivers to get used to before the season opened in Bahrain. By day 3, the drivers were posting 1.20.6 laps of Jerez, running both the M16 and old EJ15B chassis. This was an improvement of their first tests with the Toyota V8 in December 2005, where Albers and Thomas Biagi were lapping between 1.21-1.23.

== Season overview ==
The season was not a success for Midland. Early results were poor, with significant numbers of retirements that only worsened as the season progressed, despite positive comments from the Midland technical team. At the 2006 German Grand Prix, both cars were disqualified for running flexible wings that failed FIA testing. The following race in Hungary was the M16's best results - Monteiro and Albers finishing 9th and 10th respectively.

In September, the Midland team was sold by Alex Shnaider to Dutch car manufacturer Spyker Cars just before the Italian GP. The livery was changed to orange and silver, however results did not improve and the team finished 10th in the Constructors' Championship with 0 points. Over the course of the season the car scored a median qualifying performance of 19th and median fastest lap performance of 18th.

== Drivers' helmets ==
Christijan Albers wore a special helmet at the Canadian Grand Prix to cheer on the Netherlands team at the 2006 FIFA World Cup in Berlin.

== Other ==
At the British Grand Prix ITV F1 reporter Louise Goodman became the first woman to be involved in a pit stop when she removed the left rear tyre of Tiago Monteiro during a pit stop at Midland.

== Other appearances ==
In 2011, the M16 made a brief appearance in the third episode of the first season of the American legal drama television series Suits.

== Gallery ==
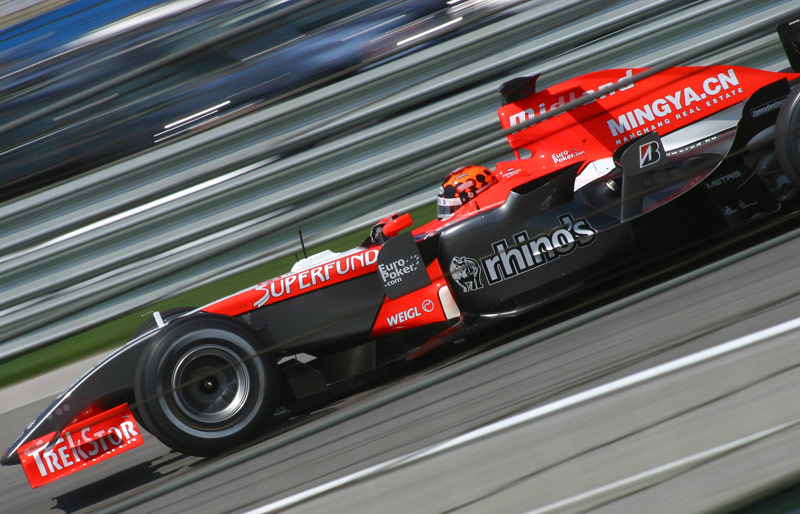
Albers driving the M16 at Indianapolis

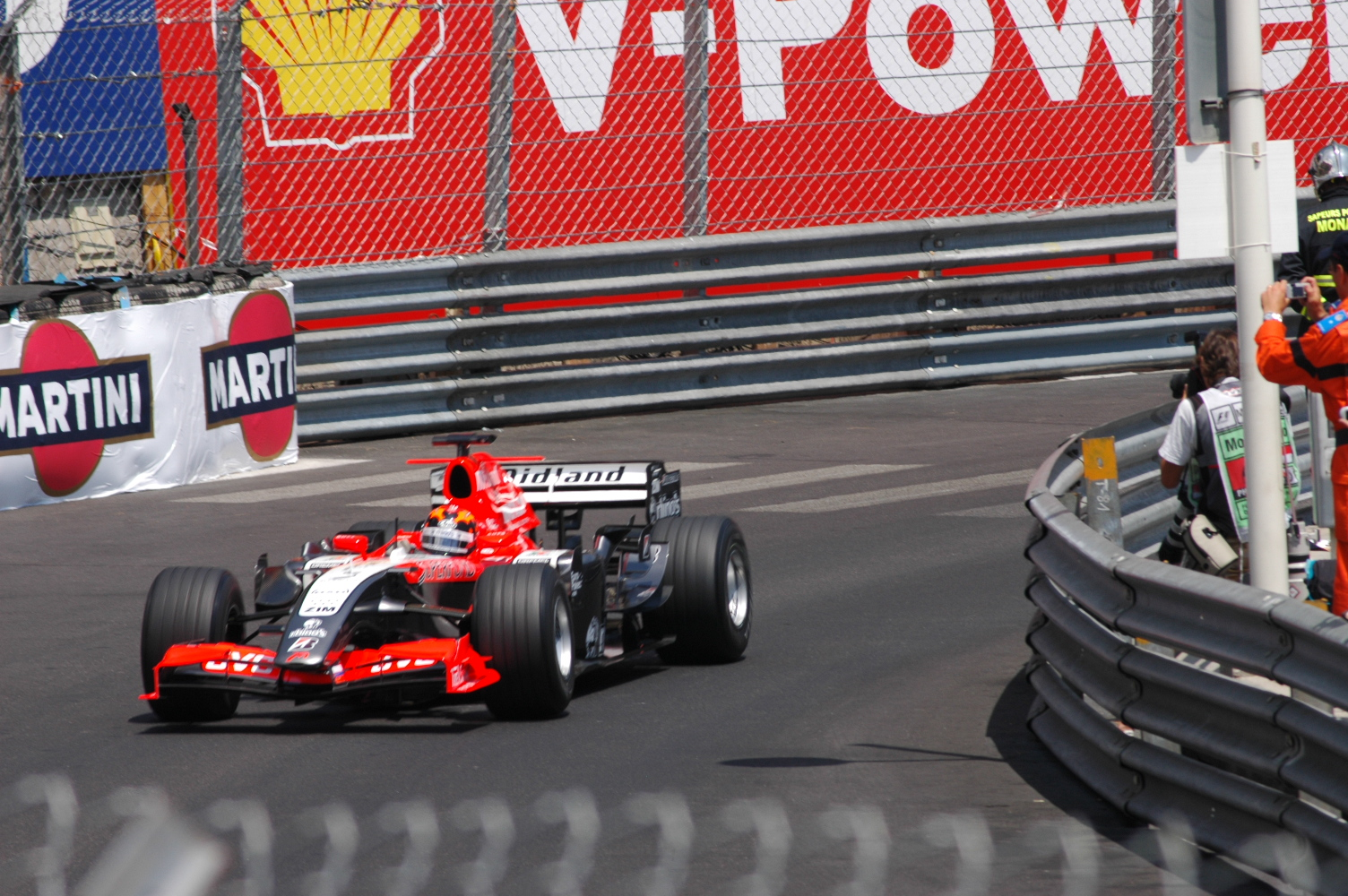
The M16 at Monaco

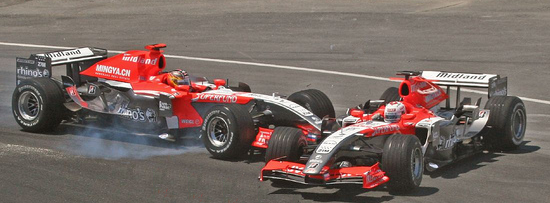
The two M16s crashed into each other at the Canadian Grand Prix

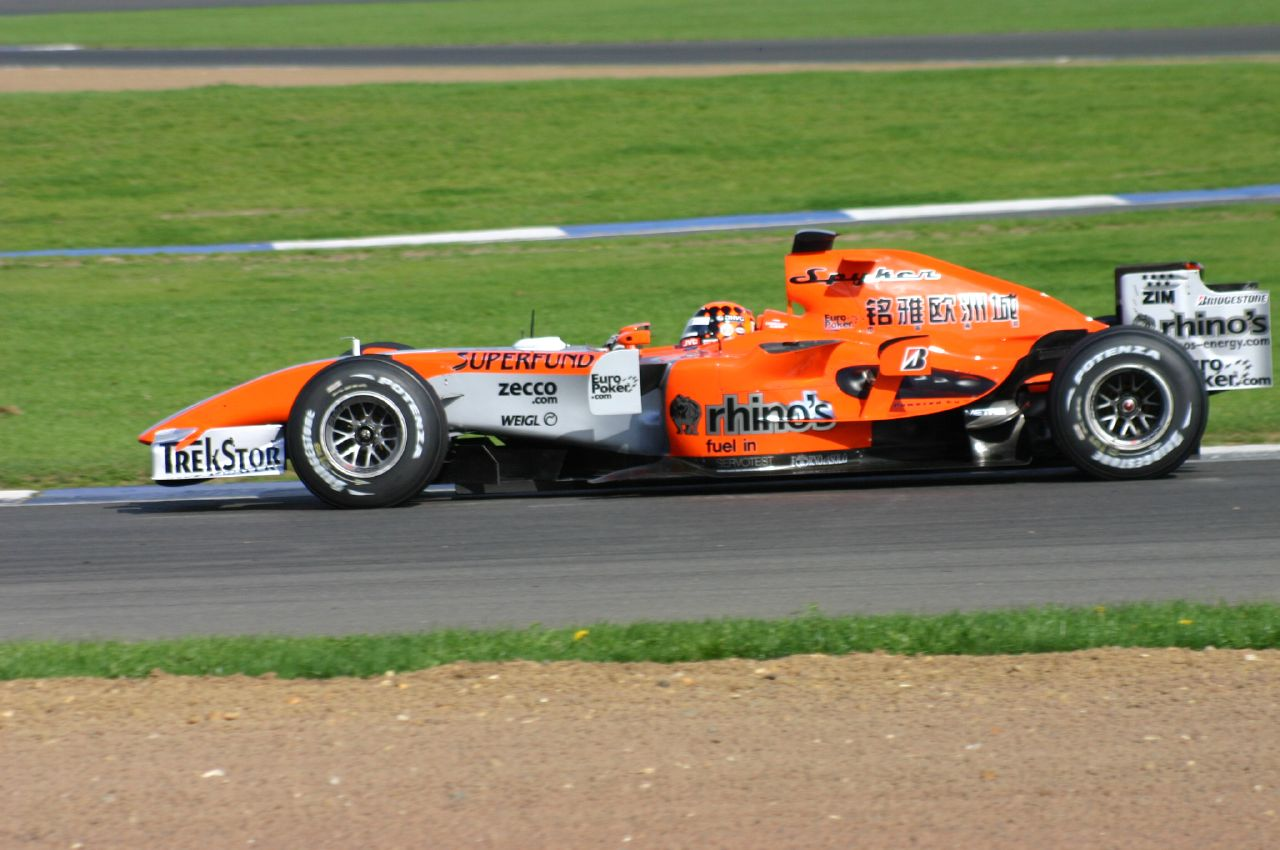
The rebranded M16 under Spyker ownership for the final three races

== Complete Formula One results ==
(key) (results in bold indicate pole position)

Year	Entrant	Engine	Tyres	Drivers	1	2	3	4	5	6	7	8	9	10	11	12	13	14	15	16	17	18	Points	WCC
2006	Midland F1 Racing; Spyker MF1 Racing	Toyota V8	**B**		BHR	MAL	AUS	SMR	EUR	ESP	MON	GBR	CAN	USA	FRA	GER	HUN	TUR	ITA	CHN	JPN	BRA	0	NC
2006	Midland F1 Racing; Spyker MF1 Racing	Toyota V8	**B**	(Portugal) Tiago Monteiro	17	13	Ret	16	12	16	15	16	14	Ret	Ret	DSQ	9	Ret	Ret	Ret	16	15	0	NC
2006	Midland F1 Racing; Spyker MF1 Racing	Toyota V8	**B**	(Netherlands) Christijan Albers	Ret	12	11	Ret	13	Ret	12	15	Ret	Ret	15	DSQ	10	Ret	17	15	Ret	14	0	NC
