= 2005 Italian Grand Prix =

Coordinates: 45°36′56″N 9°16′52″E

Race 15 of 19 in the 2005 Formula One World Championship
← Previous race	Next race →

Race details
- Date: 4 September 2005
- Official name: Formula 1 Gran Premio Vodafone d'Italia 2005
- Location: Autodromo Nazionale di Monza; Monza, Lombardy, Italy
- Course: Permanent racing facility
- Course length: 5.793 km (3.600 miles)
- Distance: 53 laps, 306.720 km (190.779 miles)
- Weather: Sunny

Pole position
Driver	(Colombia) Juan Pablo Montoya	McLaren-Mercedes
- Time: 1:21.054

Fastest lap
Driver	(Finland) Kimi Räikkönen	McLaren-Mercedes
- Time: 1:21.504 on lap 51

Podium
First	(Colombia) Juan Pablo Montoya	McLaren-Mercedes
Second	(Spain) Fernando Alonso	Renault
Third	(Italy) Giancarlo Fisichella	Renault

The 2005 Italian Grand Prix (officially the Formula 1 Gran Premio Vodafone d'Italia 2005) was a Formula One motor race held on 4 September 2005 at the Autodromo Nazionale di Monza, Italy. It was the fifteenth race of the 2005 FIA Formula One World Championship.

The 53-lap race was won from pole position by Colombia's Juan Pablo Montoya, driving a McLaren-Mercedes, his second victory with the team and penultimate in Formula One, with Renault drivers Fernando Alonso and Giancarlo Fisichella second and third respectively. Kimi Räikkönen was fourth, thus losing ground to Alonso at the top of the Drivers' Championship. Antônio Pizzonia scored his last world championship points at this race.

== Friday drivers ==
The bottom 6 teams in the 2004 Constructors' Championship were entitled to run a third car in free practice on Friday. These drivers drove on Friday but did not compete in qualifying or the race.

Constructor	Nat	Driver
McLaren-Mercedes	(Spain)	Pedro de la Rosa
Sauber-Petronas		-
Red Bull-Cosworth	(Italy)	Vitantonio Liuzzi
Toyota	(Brazil)	Ricardo Zonta
Jordan-Toyota	(Denmark)	Nicolas Kiesa
Minardi-Cosworth	(Italy)	Enrico Toccacelo

== Report ==
=== Background ===
Fernando Alonso led the Drivers' Championship with 24 points ahead of Kimi Räikkönen and 40 points ahead of Michael Schumacher. In the constructors' championship, Renault led McLaren-Mercedes by nine points and Ferrari by 44 points.

=== Practice ===
Williams's Nick Heidfeld participated in Friday free practice sessions, but since he was suffering from headaches following an accident which occurred during the tests held on the circuit the previous week, he was replaced by Antônio Pizzonia starting from the first free practice on Saturday.

=== Qualifying ===
Kimi Räikkönen set the fastest time in qualifying in his McLaren-Mercedes, but received a 10-place grid penalty for changing his engine, demoting him to 11th on the grid and giving pole to teammate Juan Pablo Montoya.

=== Race ===
Montoya led every lap, winning by 2.5 seconds from the Renault of Fernando Alonso, with Giancarlo Fisichella third in the other Renault. Räikkönen climbed through the field to finish fourth, ahead of Jarno Trulli, Ralf Schumacher, Antônio Pizzonia and Jenson Button. Räikkönen would have had a chance of winning with a one-stop strategy, but a deflated tyre forced him to make a second pit stop. Rubens Barrichello also had the same problem later in the day, and Montoya was lucky to finish in the lead, as his left rear tyre began to cut with several laps remaining.

Alonso extended his lead over Räikkönen in the Drivers' Championship to 27 points, 103 to 76, with Michael Schumacher third on 55 and Montoya fourth on 50. Mathematically, the championship was now a two-horse race between Alonso and Räikkönen. Renault retained an eight-point lead over McLaren-Mercedes in the Constructors' Championship, 144 to 136, Ferrari remaining in third on 86 and Toyota fourth on 78.

There were no retirements during the race, a feat that had not been achieved in Formula One with a full field since the 1961 Dutch Grand Prix, and would not be achieved again until the 2011 European Grand Prix. The 2005 United States Grand Prix is also considered to have had no retirements; however, only six cars started due to problems with the supply of Michelin tyres, which led to the mass withdrawal of all teams running on those tyres due to safety issues.

== Classification ==
=== Qualifying ===
Pos	No	Driver	Constructor	Lap	Gap	Grid
1	9	(Finland) Kimi Räikkönen	McLaren-Mercedes	1:20.878	—	11^{1}
2	10	(Colombia) Juan Pablo Montoya	McLaren-Mercedes	1:21.054	+0.176	1
3	5	(Spain) Fernando Alonso	Renault	1:21.319	+0.441	2
4	3	(United Kingdom) Jenson Button	BAR-Honda	1:21.369	+0.491	3
5	4	(Japan) Takuma Sato	BAR-Honda	1:21.477	+0.599	4
6	16	(Italy) Jarno Trulli	Toyota	1:21.640	+0.762	5
7	1	(Germany) Michael Schumacher	Ferrari	1:21.721	+0.843	6
8	2	(Brazil) Rubens Barrichello	Ferrari	1:21.962	+1.084	7
9	6	(Italy) Giancarlo Fisichella	Renault	1:22.068	+1.190	8
10	17	(Germany) Ralf Schumacher	Toyota	1:22.266	+1.388	9
11	14	(United Kingdom) David Coulthard	Red Bull-Cosworth	1:22.304	+1.426	10
12	11	(Canada) Jacques Villeneuve	Sauber-Petronas	1:22.356	+1.478	12
13	15	(Austria) Christian Klien	Red Bull-Cosworth	1:22.532	+1.654	13
14	7	(Australia) Mark Webber	Williams-BMW	1:22.560	+1.682	14
15	12	(Brazil) Felipe Massa	Sauber-Petronas	1:23.060	+2.182	15
16	8	(Brazil) Antônio Pizzonia	Williams-BMW	1:23.291	+2.413	16
17	18	(Portugal) Tiago Monteiro	Jordan-Toyota	1:24.666	+3.788	17
18	20	(Monaco) Robert Doornbos	Minardi-Cosworth	1:24.904	+4.026	18
19	19	(India) Narain Karthikeyan	Jordan-Toyota	1:25.859	+4.981	19
20	21	(Netherlands) Christijan Albers	Minardi-Cosworth	1:26.964	+6.086	20

Notes

- ^1 – Kimi Räikkönen received a 10-place grid penalty for an engine change.

=== Race ===
Pos	No	Driver	Constructor	Tyre	Laps	Time/Retired	Grid	Points
1	10	(Colombia) Juan Pablo Montoya	McLaren-Mercedes	MI	53	1:14:28.659	1	10
2	5	(Spain) Fernando Alonso	Renault	MI	53	+ 2.479	2	8
3	6	(Italy) Giancarlo Fisichella	Renault	MI	53	+ 17.975	8	6
4	9	(Finland) Kimi Räikkönen	McLaren-Mercedes	MI	53	+ 22.775	11	5
5	16	(Italy) Jarno Trulli	Toyota	MI	53	+ 33.786	5	4
6	17	(Germany) Ralf Schumacher	Toyota	MI	53	+ 43.925	9	3
7	8	(Brazil) Antônio Pizzonia	Williams-BMW	MI	53	+ 44.643	16	2
8	3	(United Kingdom) Jenson Button	BAR-Honda	MI	53	+ 1:03.635	3	1
9	12	(Brazil) Felipe Massa	Sauber-Petronas	MI	53	+ 1:15.413	15	
10	1	(Germany) Michael Schumacher	Ferrari	B	53	+ 1:36.070	6	
11	11	(Canada) Jacques Villeneuve	Sauber-Petronas	MI	52	+ 1 Lap	12	
12	2	(Brazil) Rubens Barrichello	Ferrari	B	52	+ 1 Lap	7	
13	15	(Austria) Christian Klien	Red Bull-Cosworth	MI	52	+ 1 Lap	13	
14	7	(Australia) Mark Webber	Williams-BMW	MI	52	+ 1 Lap	14	
15	14	(United Kingdom) David Coulthard	Red Bull-Cosworth	MI	52	+ 1 Lap	10	
16	4	(Japan) Takuma Sato	BAR-Honda	MI	52	+ 1 Lap	4	
17	18	(Portugal) Tiago Monteiro	Jordan-Toyota	B	51	+ 2 Laps	17	
18	20	(Monaco) Robert Doornbos	Minardi-Cosworth	B	51	+ 2 Laps	18	
19	21	(Netherlands) Christijan Albers	Minardi-Cosworth	B	51	+ 2 Laps	20	
20	19	(India) Narain Karthikeyan	Jordan-Toyota	B	50	+ 3 Laps	19	

== Championship standings after the race ==
- Bold text and an asterisk indicates who still has a theoretical chance of becoming World Champion.

Drivers' Championship standings

Pos	Driver	Points
1	(Spain) Fernando Alonso*	103
2	(Finland) Kimi Räikkönen*	76
3	(Germany) Michael Schumacher	55
4	(Colombia) Juan Pablo Montoya	50
5	(Italy) Jarno Trulli	43

Constructors' Championship standings

Pos	Constructor	Points
1	(France) Renault*	144
2	(United Kingdom) McLaren-Mercedes*	136
3	(Italy) Ferrari*	86
4	(Japan) Toyota*	78
5	(United Kingdom) Williams-BMW	54

- Note: Only the top five positions are included for both sets of standings.

== See also ==
- 2005 Monza GP2 Series round

Previous race: 2005 Turkish Grand Prix	FIA Formula One World Championship; 2005 season	Next race: 2005 Belgian Grand Prix
Previous race: 2004 Italian Grand Prix	Italian Grand Prix	Next race: 2006 Italian Grand Prix
