= 2005 Turkish Grand Prix =

Coordinates: 40°57′20.5″N 29°24′29.7″E

Race 14 of 19 in the 2005 Formula One World Championship
← Previous race	Next race →

Race details
- Date: 21 August 2005
- Official name: 2005 Formula 1 Turkish Grand Prix
- Location: Istanbul Park; Tuzla, Turkey
- Course: Permanent racing facility
- Course length: 5.340 km (3.318 miles)
- Distance: 58 laps, 309.356 km (192.225 miles)
- Weather: Sunny; 30°C Air; 45°C Track
- Attendance: 100,000

Pole position
Driver	(Finland) Kimi Räikkönen	McLaren-Mercedes
- Time: 1:26.797

Fastest lap
Driver	(Colombia) Juan Pablo Montoya	McLaren-Mercedes
- Time: 1:24.770 on lap 39 (lap record)

Podium
First	(Finland) Kimi Räikkönen	McLaren-Mercedes
Second	(Spain) Fernando Alonso	Renault
Third	(Colombia) Juan Pablo Montoya	McLaren-Mercedes

The 2005 Turkish Grand Prix (officially the 2005 Formula 1 Turkish Grand Prix) was a Formula One motor race held on 21 August 2005 at Istanbul Park, Tuzla, Turkey. It was the fourteenth race of the 2005 FIA Formula One World Championship and the inaugural Turkish Grand Prix.

The 58-lap race was won by Finnish driver Kimi Räikkönen, driving a McLaren-Mercedes. Räikkönen took his fifth victory of the season after starting from pole position and leading every lap. Räikkönen's Colombian teammate, Juan Pablo Montoya, ran second until he collided with a backmarker and then ran wide in the closing laps, allowing Spaniard Fernando Alonso through in his Renault.

With five races remaining, Alonso led the Drivers' Championship by 24 points from Räikkönen, while Renault's lead over McLaren in the Constructors' Championship was nine points.

== Friday drivers ==
The bottom six teams in the 2004 Constructors' Championship were entitled to run a third car in free practice on Friday. These drivers drove on Friday but did not compete in qualifying or the race.

Constructor	Nat	Driver
McLaren-Mercedes	(Spain)	Pedro de la Rosa
Red Bull-Cosworth	(Italy)	Vitantonio Liuzzi
Toyota	(Brazil)	Ricardo Zonta
Jordan-Toyota	(Denmark)	Nicolas Kiesa
Minardi-Cosworth	(Italy)	Enrico Toccacelo

== Report ==
=== Background ===
After the Hungarian Grand Prix, Fernando Alonso led the drivers' championship with 26 points ahead of Kimi Räikkönen and 32 points ahead of Michael Schumacher. In the constructors' championship, Renault led McLaren-Mercedes by twelve points and Ferrari by 31 points.

=== Qualifying ===
In qualifying, Räikkönen set the fastest time and secured his eighth pole position. Fisichella came second in the Renault ahead of his teammate Alonso.

=== Race ===
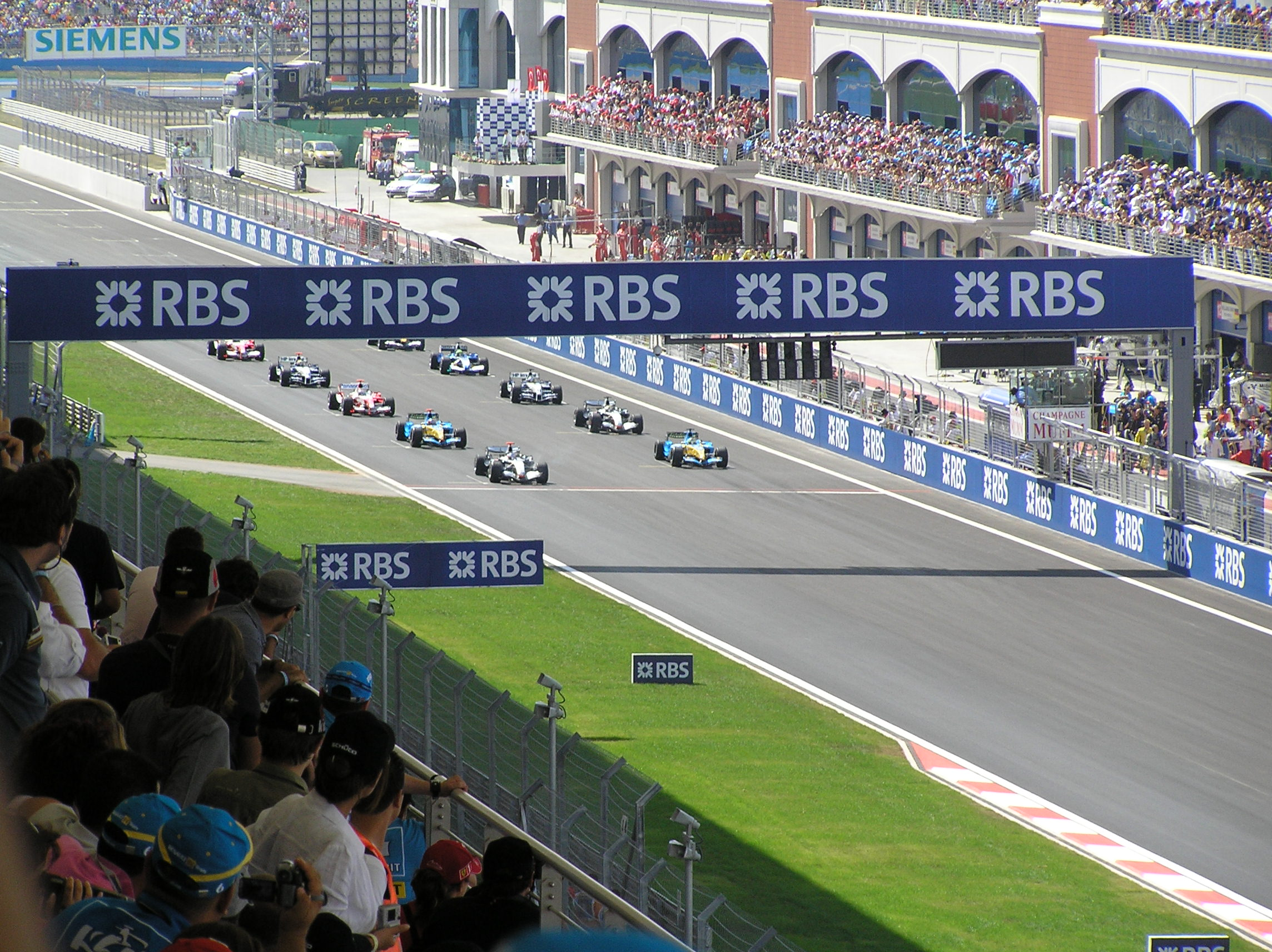
Start of the race

Michael Schumacher and Mark Webber collided on lap 14. The rear suspension of Schumacher's Ferrari was damaged, but after repairs he rejoined the race. Webber's Williams lost the nose cone.

Felipe Massa lost the front wing and bargeboard from his Sauber in a first-corner collision with the Williams of former teammate Nick Heidfeld. After replacements were fitted, Massa continued racing until his engine failed on lap 29. Both Williams cars retired from the race due to right-rear tyre failures - Webber on lap 21 and Heidfeld on lap 30.

Juan Pablo Montoya was running second on the penultimate lap when he clashed with the Jordan of Tiago Monteiro, damaging his diffuser. On the next lap Montoya ran straight ahead at Turn 8, allowing Fernando Alonso to pass him. Montoya's fastest lap was over two seconds faster than his teammate's qualifying time.

== Classification ==
=== Qualifying ===
Pos	No	Driver	Constructor	Lap	Gap	Grid
1	9	(Finland) Kimi Räikkönen	McLaren-Mercedes	1:26.797	-	1
2	6	(Italy) Giancarlo Fisichella	Renault	1:27.039	+0.242	2
3	5	(Spain) Fernando Alonso	Renault	1:27.050	+0.253	3
4	10	(Colombia) Juan Pablo Montoya	McLaren-Mercedes	1:27.352	+0.555	4
5	16	(Italy) Jarno Trulli	Toyota	1:27.501	+0.704	5
6	8	(Germany) Nick Heidfeld	Williams-BMW	1:27.929	+1.132	6
7	7	(Australia) Mark Webber	Williams-BMW	1:27.944	+1.147	7
8	12	(Brazil) Felipe Massa	Sauber-Petronas	1:28.419	+1.622	8
9	17	(Germany) Ralf Schumacher	Toyota	1:28.594	+1.797	9
10	15	(Austria) Christian Klien	Red Bull-Cosworth	1:28.963	+2.166	10
11	2	(Brazil) Rubens Barrichello	Ferrari	1:29.369	+2.572	11
12	14	(United Kingdom) David Coulthard	Red Bull-Cosworth	1:29.764	+2.967	12
13	3	(United Kingdom) Jenson Button	BAR-Honda	1:30.063	+3.266	13
14	4	(Japan) Takuma Sato	BAR-Honda	1:30.175	+3.378	20^{1}^{,} ^{3}
15	18	(Portugal) Tiago Monteiro	Jordan-Toyota	1:30.710	+3.913	14
16	21	(Netherlands) Christijan Albers	Minardi-Cosworth	1:32.186	+5.389	15
17	20	(Monaco) Robert Doornbos	Minardi-Cosworth	No time^{2}		17
18	11	(Canada) Jacques Villeneuve	Sauber-Petronas	No time^{4}		16
19	19	(India) Narain Karthikeyan	Jordan-Toyota	No time		18^{3}
20	1	(Germany) Michael Schumacher	Ferrari	No time^{5}		19^{3}

Notes

- ^1 – Takuma Sato's performance was disqualified for impeding Mark Webber during qualifying. Sato was unaware of Webber approaching as he had been reported to have no radio contact with the BAR team.
- ^2 – Robert Doornbos failed to set a time after his Minardi's brakes caught fire due to an incorrect brake pipe fitting.
- ^3 – Takuma Sato, Narain Karthikeyan and Michael Schumacher received a ten-place start penalty due to an engine change.
- ^4 – Jacques Villeneuve spun in turn 8, so he could not complete his fast lap.
- ^5 – Michael Schumacher spun in turn 9, so he could not complete his fast lap.

=== Race ===
Pos	No	Driver	Constructor	Tyre	Laps	Time/Retired	Grid	Points
1	9	(Finland) Kimi Räikkönen	McLaren-Mercedes	MI	58	1:24:34.454	1	10
2	5	(Spain) Fernando Alonso	Renault	MI	58	+ 18.609	3	8
3	10	(Colombia) Juan Pablo Montoya	McLaren-Mercedes	MI	58	+ 19.635	4	6
4	6	(Italy) Giancarlo Fisichella	Renault	MI	58	+ 37.973	2	5
5	3	(United Kingdom) Jenson Button	BAR-Honda	MI	58	+ 39.304	13	4
6	16	(Italy) Jarno Trulli	Toyota	MI	58	+ 55.420	5	3
7	14	(United Kingdom) David Coulthard	Red Bull-Cosworth	MI	58	+ 1:09.292	12	2
8	15	(Austria) Christian Klien	Red Bull-Cosworth	MI	58	+ 1:11.622	10	1
9	4	(Japan) Takuma Sato	BAR-Honda	MI	58	+ 1:19.987	PL^{6}	
10	2	(Brazil) Rubens Barrichello	Ferrari	B	57	+ 1 Lap	11	
11	11	(Canada) Jacques Villeneuve	Sauber-Petronas	MI	57	+ 1 Lap	16	
12	17	(Germany) Ralf Schumacher	Toyota	MI	57	+ 1 Lap	9	
13	20	(Monaco) Robert Doornbos	Minardi-Cosworth	B	55	+ 3 Laps	17	
14	19	(India) Narain Karthikeyan	Jordan-Toyota	B	55	+ 3 Laps	18	
15	18	(Portugal) Tiago Monteiro	Jordan-Toyota	B	55	+ 3 Laps	14	
Ret	21	(Netherlands) Christijan Albers	Minardi-Cosworth	B	48	Withdrew	15	
Ret	1	(Germany) Michael Schumacher	Ferrari	B	32	Collision Damage	19	
Ret	8	(Germany) Nick Heidfeld	Williams-BMW	MI	29	Tyre	6	
Ret	12	(Brazil) Felipe Massa	Sauber-Petronas	MI	28	Engine	8	
Ret	7	(Australia) Mark Webber	Williams-BMW	MI	20	Tyre	7	

Notes

- ^6 – Takuma Sato started the race from the pitlane.

== Championship standings after the race ==
- Bold text and an asterisk indicates who still has a theoretical chance of becoming World Champion.

Drivers' Championship standings

	Pos	Driver	Points
	1	(Spain) Fernando Alonso*	95
	2	(Finland) Kimi Räikkönen*	71
	3	(Germany) Michael Schumacher*	55
1	4	(Colombia) Juan Pablo Montoya	40
1	5	(Italy) Jarno Trulli	39

Constructors' Championship standings

Pos	Constructor	Points
1	(France) Renault*	130
2	(United Kingdom) McLaren-Mercedes*	121
3	(Italy) Ferrari*	86
4	(Japan) Toyota*	71
5	(United Kingdom) Williams-BMW*	52

- Note: Only the top five positions are included for both sets of standings.

== See also ==
- 2005 Istanbul Park GP2 Series round

Previous race: 2005 Hungarian Grand Prix	FIA Formula One World Championship; 2005 season	Next race: 2005 Italian Grand Prix
Previous race: N/A	Turkish Grand Prix	Next race: 2006 Turkish Grand Prix
