= 2005 Brazilian Grand Prix =

Coordinates: 23°42′13″S 46°41′59″W

Race 17 of 19 in the 2005 Formula One World Championship
← Previous race	Next race →

Race details
- Date: 25 September 2005
- Official name: Formula 1 Grande Prêmio do Brasil 2005
- Location: Autódromo José Carlos Pace, São Paulo, Brazil
- Course: Permanent racing facility
- Course length: 4.309 km (2.677 miles)
- Distance: 71 laps, 305.909 km (190.083 miles)
- Weather: Partially cloudy and dry, Air: 23 °C (73 °F), Track 22 °C (72 °F)

Pole position
Driver	(Spain) Fernando Alonso	Renault
- Time: 1:11.988

Fastest lap
Driver	(Finland) Kimi Räikkönen	McLaren-Mercedes
- Time: 1:12.268 on lap 29

Podium
First	(Colombia) Juan Pablo Montoya	McLaren-Mercedes
Second	(Finland) Kimi Räikkönen	McLaren-Mercedes
Third	(Spain) Fernando Alonso	Renault

The 2005 Brazilian Grand Prix (officially the Formula 1 Grande Prêmio do Brasil 2005) was a Formula One motor race held on at the Autódromo José Carlos Pace in São Paulo, Brazil on 25 September 2005. It was the seventeenth race of the 2005 FIA Formula One World Championship.

The 71-lap race was won by McLaren driver Juan Pablo Montoya, who took the seventh and final victory of his career, ahead of his teammate, Kimi Räikkönen, who finished second. Renault driver Fernando Alonso became the Drivers' Champion for the first time after he finished the race in third place.

As of 2026, this is the last Grand Prix to be won by a Colombian driver in Formula One.

== Friday drivers ==
The bottom 6 teams in the 2004 Constructors' Championship were entitled to run a third car in free practice on Friday. These drivers drove on Friday but did not compete in qualifying or the race. Enrico Toccacelo, Minardi's third driver was not present in Brazil as he competed for the Italian team in the opening round of the A1 Grand Prix series at Brands Hatch.

Constructor	Nat	Driver
McLaren-Mercedes	(Austria)	Alexander Wurz
Sauber-Petronas		-
Red Bull-Cosworth	(Italy)	Vitantonio Liuzzi
Toyota	(Brazil)	Ricardo Zonta
Jordan-Toyota	(Denmark)	Nicolas Kiesa
Minardi-Cosworth		-

== Report ==
=== Background ===
Fernando Alonso led the drivers' championship with 25 points ahead of Kimi Räikkönen and 56 points ahead of Michael Schumacher. With three races remaining, the drivers' championship was decided between Alonso and Räikkönen. A third place would be enough for Alonso to win his first world championship title, while Räikkönen would no longer have a mathematical chance even if he won and came third. In the constructors' championship, Renault led McLaren-Mercedes by six points and Ferrari by 62 points.

Williams' Nick Heidfeld, having injured his shoulder in a cycling accident in Switzerland, was replaced again by Antônio Pizzonia. The German had also missed the two previous Grands Prix due to the consequences of an accident in a test session in Monza.

=== Qualifying ===
Alonso took his eighth career pole with a time of 1:11.998 minutes ahead of Montoya and Fisichella. Button completed the second line. Räikkönen reached 5th place.

Commentators have judged Renault's qualifying performance as evidence that their "conservative phase" was over. Renault's Pat Symonds had said that the team was not aiming to settle for a simple podium finish, rather they were aiming to win. BBC's Maurice Hamilton said that "the thought that Fernando Alonso might cruise to the Championship.....was dispelled in the most convincing fashion". McLaren CEO Ron Dennis remained confident of his team's race strategy given Juan Pablo Montoya's strong second position, despite a major error in the qualifying lap of Kimi Räikkönen.

=== Race ===
Jacques Villeneuve was forced to start from pit lane as a penalty for infringement of parc ferme regulations. After getting involved in an accident at the start of the race, Mark Webber was able to rejoin, over 20 laps behind the leaders. Due to a driveshaft failure, this was Tiago Monteiro's only retirement of the 2005 season.

Juan Pablo Montoya won the race ahead of teammate Kimi Räikkönen; McLaren's first 1–2 finish since the 2000 Austrian Grand Prix. Fernando Alonso finished 3rd and thus became World Champion for the first time, at the time the youngest ever champion at 24 years and 58 days surpassing Emerson Fittipaldi's record of 25 years and 273 days set in 1972, and the first Spaniard to do so. The result of the Grand Prix marked the only point during the season when McLaren had more championship points than Renault.

== Classification ==
=== Qualifying ===
Pos	No	Driver	Constructor	Lap	Gap	Grid
1	5	(Spain) Fernando Alonso	Renault	1:11.988	—	1
2	10	(Colombia) Juan Pablo Montoya	McLaren-Mercedes	1:12.145	+0.157	2
3	6	(Italy) Giancarlo Fisichella	Renault	1:12.558	+0.570	3
4	3	(United Kingdom) Jenson Button	BAR-Honda	1:12.696	+0.708	4
5	9	(Finland) Kimi Räikkönen	McLaren-Mercedes	1:12.781	+0.793	5
6	15	(Austria) Christian Klien	Red Bull-Cosworth	1:12.889	+0.901	6
7	1	(Germany) Michael Schumacher	Ferrari	1:12.976	+0.988	7
8	16	(Italy) Jarno Trulli	Toyota	1:13.041	+1.053	17^{1}
9	12	(Brazil) Felipe Massa	Sauber-Petronas	1:13.151	+1.163	8
10	2	(Brazil) Rubens Barrichello	Ferrari	1:13.183	+1.195	9
11	17	(Germany) Ralf Schumacher	Toyota	1:13.285	+1.297	10
12	11	(Canada) Jacques Villeneuve	Sauber-Petronas	1:13.372	+1.384	20^{2}
13	18	(Portugal) Tiago Monteiro	Jordan-Toyota	1:13.387	+1.399	11
14	7	(Australia) Mark Webber	Williams-BMW	1:13.538	+1.550	12
15	8	(Brazil) Antônio Pizzonia	Williams-BMW	1:13.581	+1.593	13
16	14	(United Kingdom) David Coulthard	Red Bull-Cosworth	1:13.844	+1.856	14
17	19	(India) Narain Karthikeyan	Jordan-Toyota	1:14.520	+2.532	15
18	21	(Netherlands) Christijan Albers	Minardi-Cosworth	1:14.763	+2.775	16
19	4	(Japan) Takuma Sato	BAR-Honda	No time^{3}		19^{1}^{,}^{3}
20	20	(Monaco) Robert Doornbos	Minardi-Cosworth	No time^{4}		18

Notes

- ^1 – Jarno Trulli and Takuma Sato received a 10-place grid penalty for engine changes.
- ^2 – Jacques Villeneuve was dropped to the back of the grid for a breach of parc fermé rules.
- ^3 – Takuma Sato did not drive a qualifying lap because she was subject to a ten-place grid penalty given for the accident in the Belgian Grand Prix where he crashed into Michael Schumacher.
- ^4 – Robert Doornbos was left without time in after spinning at turn 12 and aborting the attempt.

=== Race ===
Pos	No	Driver	Constructor	Tyre	Laps	Time/Retired	Grid	Points
1	10	(Colombia) Juan Pablo Montoya	McLaren-Mercedes	MI	71	1:29:20.574	2	10
2	9	(Finland) Kimi Räikkönen	McLaren-Mercedes	MI	71	+2.527	5	8
3	5	(Spain) Fernando Alonso	Renault	MI	71	+24.840	1	6
4	1	(Germany) Michael Schumacher	Ferrari	B	71	+35.668	7	5
5	6	(Italy) Giancarlo Fisichella	Renault	MI	71	+40.218	3	4
6	2	(Brazil) Rubens Barrichello	Ferrari	B	71	+1:09.173	9	3
7	3	(United Kingdom) Jenson Button	BAR-Honda	MI	70	+1 Lap	4	2
8	17	(Germany) Ralf Schumacher	Toyota	MI	70	+1 Lap	10	1
9	15	(Austria) Christian Klien	Red Bull-Cosworth	MI	70	+1 Lap	6	
10	4	(Japan) Takuma Sato	BAR-Honda	MI	70	+1 Lap	19	
11	12	(Brazil) Felipe Massa	Sauber-Petronas	MI	70	+1 Lap	8	
12	11	(Canada) Jacques Villeneuve	Sauber-Petronas	MI	70	+1 Lap	PL^{5}	
13	16	(Italy) Jarno Trulli	Toyota	MI	69	Puncture	17	
14	21	(Netherlands) Christijan Albers	Minardi-Cosworth	B	69	+2 Laps	16	
15	19	(India) Narain Karthikeyan	Jordan-Toyota	B	68	+3 Laps	15	
Ret	18	(Portugal) Tiago Monteiro	Jordan-Toyota	B	55	Driveshaft	PL^{5}	
NC	7	(Australia) Mark Webber	Williams-BMW	MI	45	+26 Laps	12	
Ret	20	(Monaco) Robert Doornbos	Minardi-Cosworth	B	34	Engine	18	
Ret	8	(Brazil) Antônio Pizzonia	Williams-BMW	MI	0	Collision	13	
Ret	14	(United Kingdom) David Coulthard	Red Bull-Cosworth	MI	0	Collision	14	

Notes

- ^5 – Tiago Monteiro and Jacques Villeneuve started the race from the pitlane.

== Championship standings after the race ==
- Bold text and an asterisk indicates who still has a theoretical chance of becoming World Champion.

Drivers' Championship standings

	Pos	Driver	Points
	1	(Spain) Fernando Alonso	117
	2	(Finland) Kimi Räikkönen	94
1	3	(Colombia) Juan Pablo Montoya	60
1	4	(Germany) Michael Schumacher	60
1	5	(Italy) Giancarlo Fisichella	45

Constructors' Championship standings

	Pos	Constructor	Points
1	1	(United Kingdom) McLaren-Mercedes*	164
1	2	(France) Renault*	162
	3	(Italy) Ferrari	98
	4	(Japan) Toyota	81
	5	(United Kingdom) Williams-BMW	59

- Note: Only the top five positions are included for both sets of standings.

Previous race: 2005 Belgian Grand Prix	FIA Formula One World Championship; 2005 season	Next race: 2005 Japanese Grand Prix
Previous race: 2004 Brazilian Grand Prix	Brazilian Grand Prix	Next race: 2006 Brazilian Grand Prix
