= 2005 Belgian Grand Prix =

Coordinates: 50°26′14″N 5°58′17″E

Race 16 of 19 in the 2005 Formula One World Championship
| ← Previous race | Next race → |
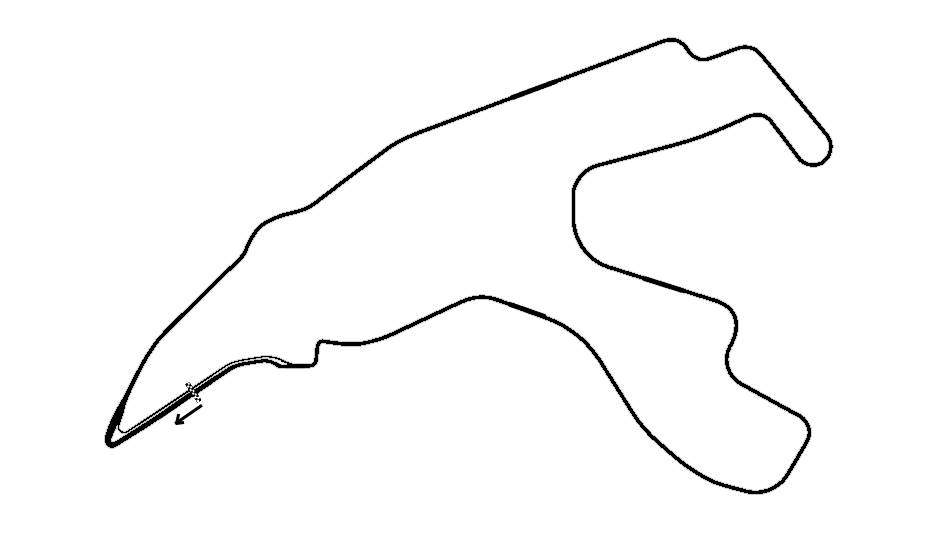

Race details
- Date: 11 September 2005
- Official name: 2005 Formula 1 Belgian Grand Prix
- Location: Circuit de Spa-Francorchamps, Francorchamps, Wallonia, Belgium
- Course: Permanent racing facility
- Course length: 6.976 km (4.335 miles)
- Distance: 44 laps, 306.944 km (190.726 miles)
- Weather: Wet and dry

Pole position
| Driver | (Colombia) Juan Pablo Montoya | McLaren-Mercedes |
- Time: 1:46.391

Fastest lap
| Driver | (Germany) Ralf Schumacher | Toyota |
- Time: 1:51.543 on lap 44

Podium
| First | (Finland) Kimi Räikkönen | McLaren-Mercedes |
| Second | (Spain) Fernando Alonso | Renault |
| Third | (United Kingdom) Jenson Button | BAR-Honda |

The 2005 Belgian Grand Prix (officially the 2005 Formula 1 Belgian Grand Prix) was a Formula One motor race held on 11 September 2005 at Circuit de Spa-Francorchamps near the village of Francorchamps, Wallonia, Belgium. It was the sixteenth race of the 2005 FIA Formula One World Championship and the 62nd Belgian Grand Prix.

The 44-lap race was won by Finnish driver Kimi Räikkönen, driving a McLaren-Mercedes, after he started from second position. Räikkönen's Colombian teammate, Juan Pablo Montoya, took pole position and led until his second pit stop on lap 33; he then maintained second place until a late collision with Brazilian driver Antônio Pizzonia in the Williams-BMW. Spaniard Fernando Alonso thus took second in his Renault, with Englishman Jenson Button third in a BAR-Honda.

With three races remaining, Alonso led the Drivers' Championship by 25 points from Räikkönen, needing only six more to clinch the title. In the Constructors' Championship, McLaren reduced Renault's lead to six points.

It was also the last race at Spa-Francorchamps with this layout with changes to the Bus Stop chicane and pitlane completed for the 2007 race.

== Friday drivers ==
The bottom 6 teams in the 2004 Constructors' Championship were entitled to run a third car in free practice on Friday. These drivers drove on Friday but did not compete in qualifying or the race.

| Constructor | Nat | Driver |
|---|---|---|
| McLaren-Mercedes | (Austria) | Alexander Wurz |
| Sauber-Petronas | | - |
| Red Bull-Cosworth | (Italy) | Vitantonio Liuzzi |
| Toyota | (Brazil) | Ricardo Zonta |
| Jordan-Toyota | (Denmark) | Nicolas Kiesa |
| Minardi-Cosworth | (Italy) | Enrico Toccacelo |

== Report ==
=== Background ===
Before the race, In the World Drivers' Championship Renault driver Fernando Alonso was leading with 103 points; Kimi Räikkönen was second on 76 points, 27 points behind Alonso. Behind Alonso and Räikkönen in the Drivers' Championship, Michael Schumacher was third on 55 points in a Ferrari, with Juan Pablo Montoya and Jarno Trulli on 50 and 43 points respectively. Renault were leading the Constructors' Championship with 144 points and McLaren were second with 136 points, with Ferrari third on 58 points.

=== Practice and qualifying ===
Four practice sessions were held before the Sunday race—two on Friday from 11:00 to 12:00 and 14:00 to 15:00 local time, with the final two sessions held on Saturday morning between 09:00 to 09:45 and 10:15 to 11:00. In the first free practice session on Friday, Räikkönen was fastest with 1:48.206 minutes ahead of Wurz and Fisichella. In the second session on Friday, no driver recorded valid times due to adverse weather conditions. The only drivers who took to the track during the session were Liuzzi, Doornbos and Alonso. Running was stopped just five minutes into the one-hour session after Liuzzi's car swerved left under braking for Les Combes and spun 180 degrees before hitting the barriers on the right hand side then spinning across the gravel and coming to rest at a second set of barriers.

Saturday's afternoon qualifying session took place as a one-lap session held between 13:00 and 14:00. Drivers went out one at a time in the reverse order of their finishing positions at the previous race. The cars ran on the fuel that would be used for the Sunday race.

=== Race ===
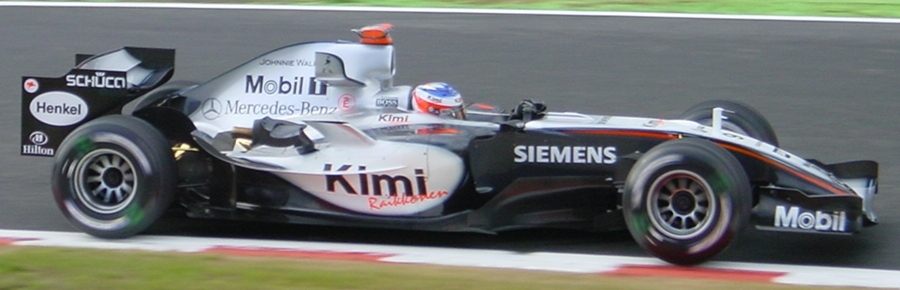
Kimi Räikkönen won the race for the second consecutive year for McLaren.

The race took place in the afternoon from 14:00 local time. On lap 11 Fisichella had an accident at Eau Rouge, emerging unhurt from his wrecked Renault but this brought out the safety car. On lap 14, Takuma Sato hit Michael Schumacher's car from behind, causing both to retire. Antônio Pizzonia crashed into Juan Pablo Montoya—in second position at the time—shortly before the finish of the race. Jacques Villeneuve was able to finish sixth by virtue of a one-stop pit strategy, while other drivers stopped as many as five times.

This race saw the Jordan team score their final point, courtesy of Tiago Monteiro, while the BAR team achieved their last podium finish through Jenson Button. Also, Ralf Schumacher scored his last, and Toyota's first, fastest lap.

=== Post-race ===
The race stewards ruled that Sato had caused the collision with Schumacher, and he would consequently drop ten places on the grid for the next Grand Prix in Brazil. They also fined Pizzonia $8,000 for his collision with Montoya.

Unusually, McLaren did not send a representative to the podium to collect the constructors' trophy, so, Räikkönen accepted it on behalf of the team.

== Classification ==
=== Qualifying ===
| Pos | No | Driver | Constructor | Lap | Gap | Grid |
|---|---|---|---|---|---|---|
| 1 | 10 | (Colombia) Juan Pablo Montoya | McLaren-Mercedes | 1:46.391 | | 1 |
| 2 | 9 | (Finland) Kimi Räikkönen | McLaren-Mercedes | 1:46.440 | +0.049 | 2 |
| 3 | 6 | (Italy) Giancarlo Fisichella | Renault | 1:46.497 | +0.106 | 13^{1} |
| 4 | 16 | (Italy) Jarno Trulli | Toyota | 1:46.596 | +0.205 | 3 |
| 5 | 5 | (Spain) Fernando Alonso | Renault | 1:46.760 | +0.369 | 4 |
| 6 | 17 | (Germany) Ralf Schumacher | Toyota | 1:47.401 | +1.010 | 5 |
| 7 | 1 | (Germany) Michael Schumacher | Ferrari | 1:47.476 | +1.085 | 6 |
| 8 | 12 | (Brazil) Felipe Massa | Sauber-Petronas | 1:47.867 | +1.476 | 7 |
| 9 | 3 | (United Kingdom) Jenson Button | BAR-Honda | 1:47.978 | +1.587 | 8 |
| 10 | 7 | (Australia) Mark Webber | Williams-BMW | 1:48.071 | +1.680 | 9 |
| 11 | 4 | (Japan) Takuma Sato | BAR-Honda | 1:48.353 | +1.962 | 10 |
| 12 | 14 | (United Kingdom) David Coulthard | Red Bull-Cosworth | 1:48.508 | +2.117 | 11 |
| 13 | 2 | (Brazil) Rubens Barrichello | Ferrari | 1:48.550 | +2.159 | 12 |
| 14 | 11 | (Canada) Jacques Villeneuve | Sauber-Petronas | 1:48.889 | +2.498 | 14 |
| 15 | 8 | (Brazil) Antônio Pizzonia | Williams-BMW | 1:48.898 | +2.507 | 15 |
| 16 | 15 | (Austria) Christian Klien | Red Bull-Cosworth | 1:48.994 | +2.603 | 16 |
| 17 | 20 | (Monaco) Robert Doornbos | Minardi-Cosworth | 1:49.779 | +3.388 | 17 |
| 18 | 21 | (Netherlands) Christijan Albers | Minardi-Cosworth | 1:49.842 | +3.451 | 18 |
| 19 | 18 | (Portugal) Tiago Monteiro | Jordan-Toyota | 1:51.498 | +5.107 | 19 |
| 20 | 19 | (India) Narain Karthikeyan | Jordan-Toyota | 1:51.675 | +5.284 | 20 |

Notes

- ^1 – Giancarlo Fisichella started the race from 13th place – the result of a ten-place grid penalty given for an engine change between final practice and qualifying on the Saturday.

=== Race ===
| Pos | No | Driver | Constructor | Tyre | Laps | Time/Retired | Grid | Points |
|---|---|---|---|---|---|---|---|---|
| 1 | 9 | (Finland) Kimi Räikkönen | McLaren-Mercedes | MI | 44 | 1:30:01.295 | 2 | 10 |
| 2 | 5 | (Spain) Fernando Alonso | Renault | MI | 44 | + 28.394 | 4 | 8 |
| 3 | 3 | (United Kingdom) Jenson Button | BAR-Honda | MI | 44 | + 32.077 | 8 | 6 |
| 4 | 7 | (Australia) Mark Webber | Williams-BMW | MI | 44 | + 1:09.167 | 9 | 5 |
| 5 | 2 | (Brazil) Rubens Barrichello | Ferrari | B | 44 | + 1:18.136 | 12 | 4 |
| 6 | 11 | (Canada) Jacques Villeneuve | Sauber-Petronas | MI | 44 | + 1:27.435 | 14 | 3 |
| 7 | 17 | (Germany) Ralf Schumacher | Toyota | MI | 44 | + 1:27.574 | 5 | 2 |
| 8 | 18 | (Portugal) Tiago Monteiro | Jordan-Toyota | B | 43 | + 1 Lap | 19 | 1 |
| 9 | 15 | (Austria) Christian Klien | Red Bull-Cosworth | MI | 43 | + 1 Lap | 16 | |
| 10 | 12 | (Brazil) Felipe Massa | Sauber-Petronas | MI | 43 | + 1 Lap | 7 | |
| 11 | 19 | (India) Narain Karthikeyan | Jordan-Toyota | B | 43 | + 1 Lap | 20 | |
| 12 | 21 | (Netherlands) Christijan Albers | Minardi-Cosworth | B | 42 | + 2 Laps | PL^{1} | |
| 13 | 20 | (Monaco) Robert Doornbos | Minardi-Cosworth | B | 41 | + 3 Laps | PL^{1} | |
| 14 | 10 | (Colombia) Juan Pablo Montoya | McLaren-Mercedes | MI | 40 | Collision | 1 | |
| 15 | 8 | (Brazil) Antônio Pizzonia | Williams-BMW | MI | 39 | Collision | 15 | |
| Ret | 16 | (Italy) Jarno Trulli | Toyota | MI | 34 | Accident | 3 | |
| Ret | 14 | (United Kingdom) David Coulthard | Red Bull-Cosworth | MI | 18 | Engine | 11 | |
| Ret | 1 | (Germany) Michael Schumacher | Ferrari | B | 13 | Collision | 6 | |
| Ret | 4 | (Japan) Takuma Sato | BAR-Honda | MI | 13 | Collision | 10 | |
| Ret | 6 | (Italy) Giancarlo Fisichella | Renault | MI | 10 | Accident | 13 | |

Notes

- ^1 – Robert Doornbos and Christijan Albers started the race from the pitlane.

== Championship standings after the race ==
- Bold text and an asterisk indicates who still has a theoretical chance of becoming World Champion.

Drivers' Championship standings

| Pos | Driver | Points |
|---|---|---|
| 1 | (Spain) Fernando Alonso* | 111 |
| 2 | (Finland) Kimi Räikkönen* | 86 |
| 3 | (Germany) Michael Schumacher | 55 |
| 4 | (Colombia) Juan Pablo Montoya | 50 |
| 5 | (Italy) Jarno Trulli | 43 |

Constructors' Championship standings

| Pos | Constructor | Points |
|---|---|---|
| 1 | (France) Renault* | 152 |
| 2 | (United Kingdom) McLaren-Mercedes* | 146 |
| 3 | (Italy) Ferrari | 90 |
| 4 | (Japan) Toyota | 80 |
| 5 | (United Kingdom) Williams-BMW | 59 |

- Note: Only the top five positions are included for both sets of standings.

== See also ==
- 2005 Spa-Francorchamps GP2 Series round

| Previous race: 2005 Italian Grand Prix | FIA Formula One World Championship; 2005 season | Next race: 2005 Brazilian Grand Prix |
| Previous race: 2004 Belgian Grand Prix | Belgian Grand Prix | Next race: 2007 Belgian Grand Prix |
