= TF101 =

TF101 may refer to:

- Toyota TF101, a Formula One car
- Asus Eee Pad Transformer, an Android computer
- TF-101B, a variant of the McDonnell F-101 Voodoo
