= Toyota TF103 =

Formula One car for 2003 season

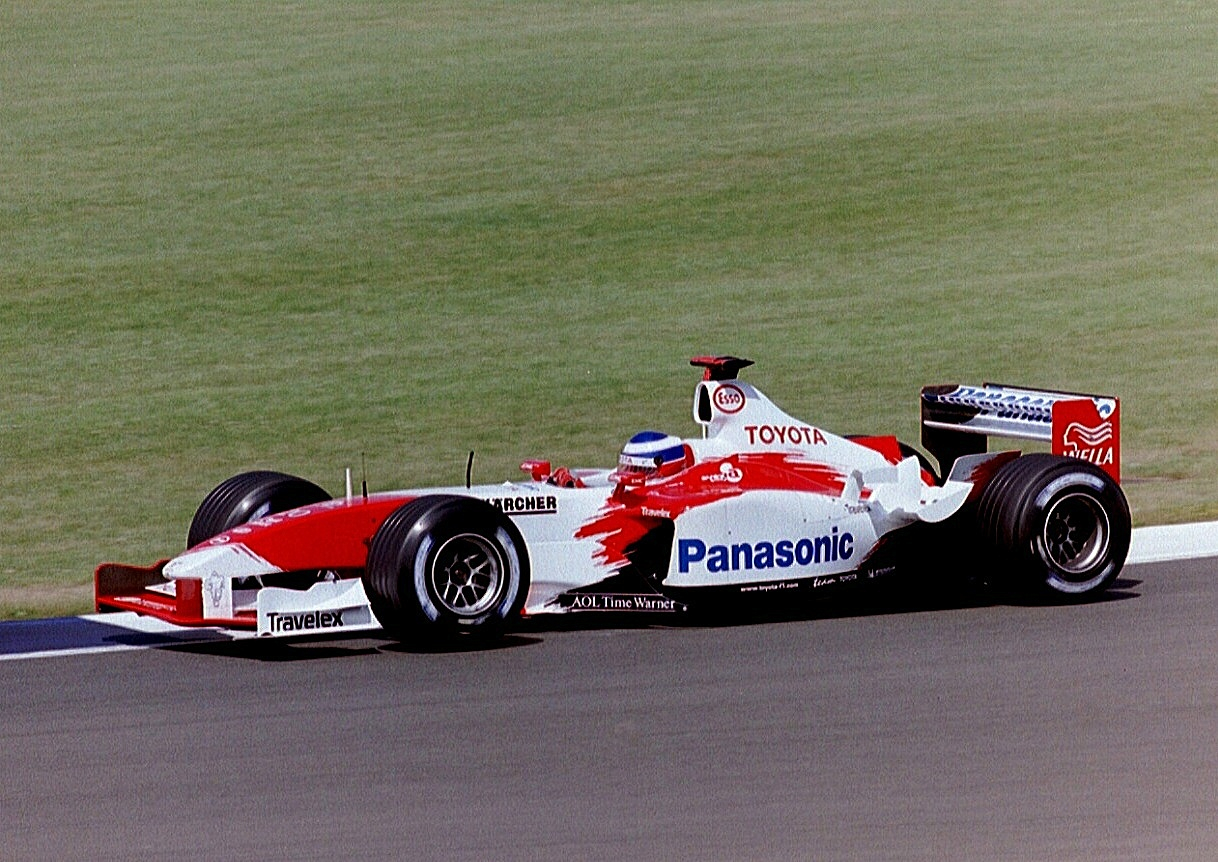
- Olivier Panis driving the TF103 at the British Grand Prix
- Category: Formula One
- Constructor: Toyota
- Designers: Keizo Takahashi (Technical Director); Gustav Brunner (Chief Designer); Paul White (Deputy Chief Designer); Olivier Hulot (Head of Electronics); René Hilhorst (Head of Aerodynamics); Luca Marmorini (Engine Director); Hiroshi Yajima (Chief Designer, Engine)
- Predecessor: TF102
- Successor: TF104

Technical specifications
- Chassis: carbon-fibre and honeycomb composite monocoque
- Suspension (front): Pushrod with Torsion bar
- Suspension (rear): Pushrod with Torsion bar
- Engine: Toyota RVX-03 3.0-litre 72-degree V10 naturally-aspirated mid-engined
- Transmission: Toyota 7-speed, semi-automatic
- Power: 845 hp @ 18,400 rpm
- Fuel: Esso
- Tyres: Michelin

Competition history
- Notable entrants: Panasonic Toyota Racing
- Notable drivers: 20. (France) Olivier Panis; 21. (Brazil) Cristiano da Matta
- Debut: 2003 Australian Grand Prix
- Last event: 2003 Japanese Grand Prix
Races	Wins	Poles	F/Laps
16	0	0	0
- Constructors' Championships: 0
- Drivers' Championships: 0

The Toyota TF103 was the car with which the Toyota F1 team competed in the 2003 Formula One season. The chassis was designed by Gustav Brunner and René Hilhorst with Luca Marmorini designing the engine. Unveiled on January 8, 2003, at the Paul Ricard circuit, its drivers were the Frenchman Olivier Panis and Brazilian Cristiano da Matta, the reigning CART FedEx Championship Series Champion from 2002.

== Development ==
The TF103 was quite a conservative design, by the team's admission it was more of a 'logical evolution' from its predecessor the TF102. Lighter and with more downforce, the car was a joint effort between Gustav Brunner's design team and Keizo Takahashi, chief of Technical co-ordination.

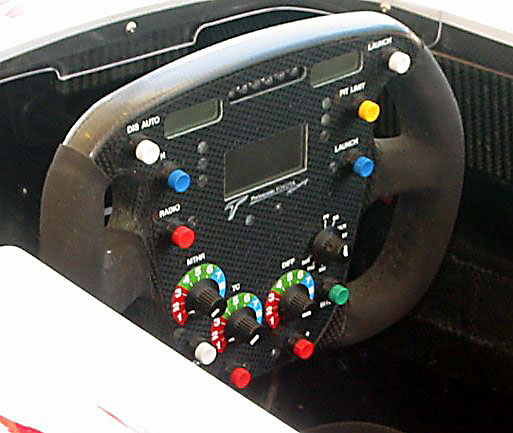
The steering wheel of TF103

The biggest improvement over the TF102 came with the engine, the RVX-03 had been tested for the first time in September 2002 and offered the team benefits twofold over the RVX-02; it was lighter, and provided more power. The engine was the brainchild of Italian designer Luca Marmorini.

== Performance ==
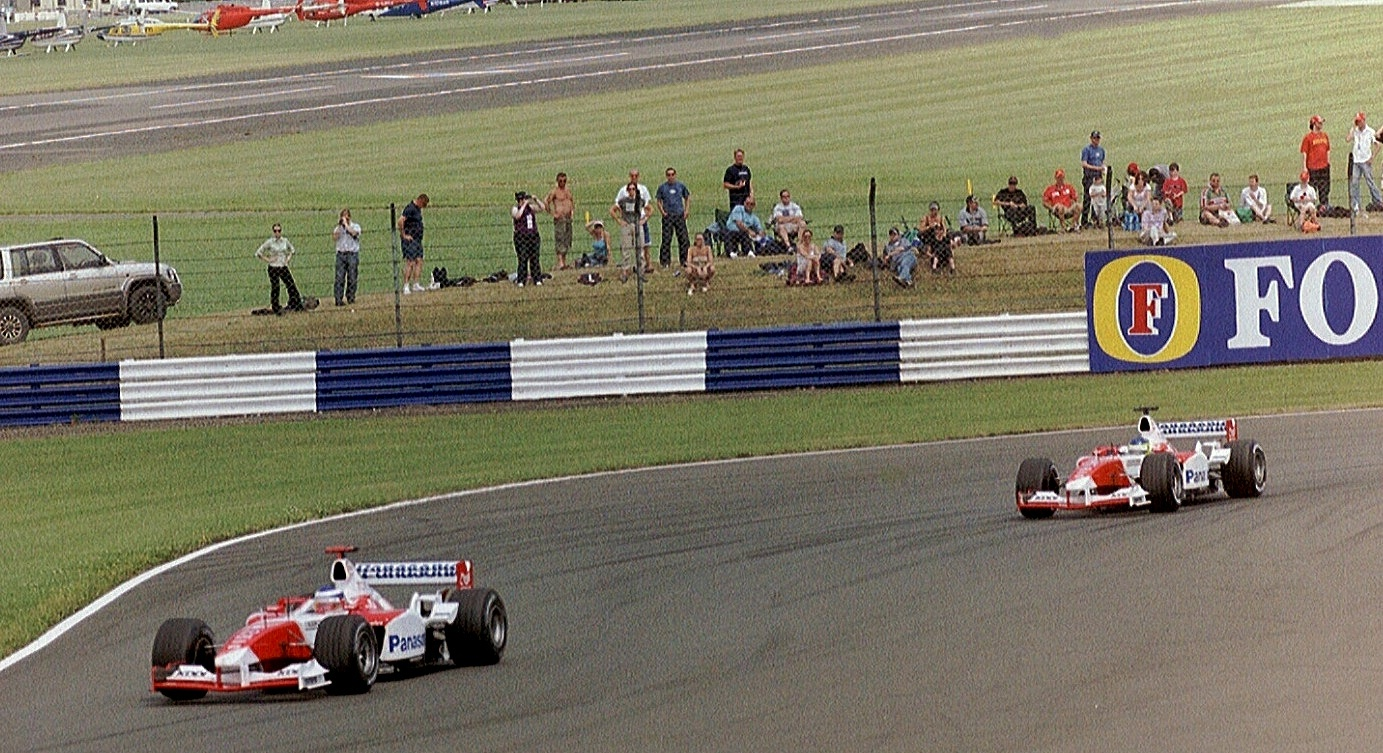
Panis leads teammate Da Matta during the British Grand Prix, where the Toyota cars briefly held a 1–2 lead.

The TF103 stepped up a level in terms of performance too, with the car scoring a total of sixteen points between its drivers, da Matta outscoring Panis 10–6. Perhaps the most notable race involving the TF103 was at Silverstone for the British Grand Prix when both cars ran 1-2 for a time amidst the confusion brought about by a track invader on the 11th lap.

In the constructors' standings, Toyota finished in eighth.

== Complete Formula One results ==
(key)

Year	Chassis	Engine	Tyres	Drivers	1	2	3	4	5	6	7	8	9	10	11	12	13	14	15	16	Points	WCC
2003	TF103	Toyota RVX-03 V10	M		AUS	MAL	BRA	SMR	ESP	AUT	MON	CAN	EUR	FRA	GBR	GER	HUN	ITA	USA	JPN	16	8th
2003	TF103	Toyota RVX-03 V10	M	(France) Olivier Panis	Ret	Ret	Ret	9	Ret	Ret	13	8	Ret	8	11	5	Ret	Ret	Ret	10	16	8th
2003	TF103	Toyota RVX-03 V10	M	(Brazil) Cristiano da Matta	Ret	11	10	12	6	10	9	11	Ret	11	7	6	11	Ret	9	7	16	8th
