= 2003 United States Grand Prix =

Coordinates: 39°47′42″N 86°14′05″W

Race 15 of 16 in the 2003 Formula One World Championship
← Previous race	Next race →

Race details
- Date: September 28, 2003
- Official name: 2003 United States Grand Prix
- Location: Indianapolis Motor Speedway; Speedway, Indiana
- Course: Permanent racing facility
- Course length: 4.192 km (2.605 miles)
- Distance: 73 laps, 306.016 km (190.238 miles)
- Weather: Scattered showers with temperatures up to 20.6 °C (69.1 °F); Wind speeds up to 25.93 km/h (16.11 mph)

Pole position
Driver	(Finland) Kimi Räikkönen	McLaren-Mercedes
- Time: 1:11.670

Fastest lap
Driver	(Germany) Michael Schumacher	Ferrari
- Time: 1:11.473 on lap 13

Podium
First	(Germany) Michael Schumacher	Ferrari
Second	(Finland) Kimi Räikkönen	McLaren-Mercedes
Third	(Germany) Heinz-Harald Frentzen	Sauber-Petronas

The 2003 United States Grand Prix (formally the 2003 United States Grand Prix) was a Formula One motor race held on September 28, 2003, at the Indianapolis Motor Speedway in Speedway, Indiana. It was the fifteenth and penultimate race of the 2003 Formula One World Championship and the fourth United States Grand Prix at Indianapolis. Ferrari's Michael Schumacher won the 73-lap race after starting seventh. McLaren's Kimi Räikkönen finished second from a pole position start, with Sauber's Heinz-Harald Frentzen third, his first podium finish in three years and his last.

Michael Schumacher led the World Drivers' Championship before the race, with Williams leading his team Ferrari in the World Constructors' Championship. Räikkönen began from pole position after setting the fastest qualifying lap in the second qualifying session. He led for the first 18 laps before making a pit stop for rain tyres due to changing weather conditions. Six different drivers shared the race lead throughout the race due to changing weather conditions. Michael Schumacher overtook British American Racing (BAR) driver Jenson Button to take the lead on lap 38, holding it for the rest of the race to claim his sixth victory of the season and the 70th of his career.

The race result increased Michael Schumacher's lead in the World Drivers' Championship to nine championship points over Räikkönen, while Williams driver Juan Pablo Montoya remained third but could no longer win the title because he finished sixth following a collision with Schumacher's teammate Rubens Barrichello on the second lap that earned him a drive-through penalty. Ferrari retook the World Constructors' Championship lead from Williams with a three-point advantage. McLaren were another 16 championship points behind with one race remaining in the season.

== Background ==
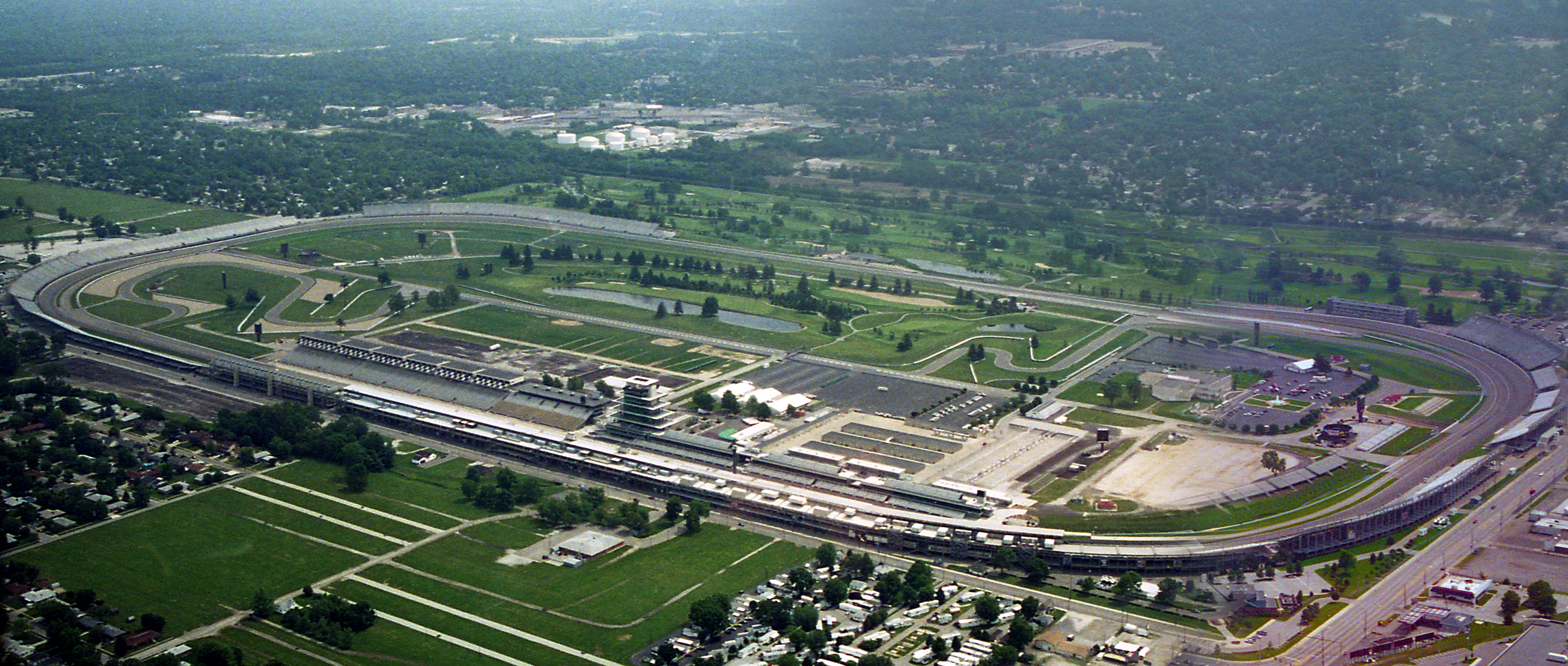
The Indianapolis Motor Speedway, where the race was held

The 2003 United States Grand Prix was the penultimate round of the 2003 Formula One World Championship, held on 28 September 2003, at the 4.192 km (2.605 mi) Indianapolis Motor Speedway (IMS) road course in Speedway, Indiana, north of Indianapolis. It was the fourth United States Grand Prix held at Indianapolis, which had previously hosted the Indianapolis 500 as part of the Formula One World Championship from 1950 to 1960, since the race returned to the series in 2000 after a nine-year absence. The Porsche Supercup held support races during the weekend.

Following his victory at the Italian Grand Prix two weeks earlier, Ferrari driver Michael Schumacher led the World Drivers' Championship with 82 championship points, three ahead of Williams driver Juan Pablo Montoya in second and another four ahead of McLaren's Kimi Räikkönen in third. Montoya's teammate Ralf Schumacher was fourth with 58 championship points and Ferrari's Rubens Barrichello was fifth with 55 championship points. With two races left in the season and 10 championship points on offer for victory, Michael Schumacher could take his record-breaking sixth world title if he won, Räikkönen was third and Montoya sixth. Even if Montoya won the season-ending Japanese Grand Prix, Schumacher would be the champion if he scored no more championship points, having won more races than Montoya. Williams led the World Constructors' Championship with 141 championship points, four more than Ferrari in second. McLaren were third with 120 championship points. Renault were fourth with 79 championship points, with British American Racing (BAR) fifth with 18 championship points.

Following the Italian Grand Prix on 14 September, all teams tested at various European racing tracks in preparation for the United States Grand Prix. McLaren, Renault and Toyota all tested for two days at Spain's Circuit de Catalunya, while Williams and Jordan tested for three days at England's Silverstone Circuit. Ferrari did three days of testing at the Circuito de Jerez in Spain, with Sauber joining on the first two days, BAR on the final two days and Toyota on all four days. Minardi conducted a comparison test between its PS03 vehicle and the outdated Arrows A23 car at the Mugello Circuit in Italy. Toyota's Olivier Panis spent a day at France's Circuit Paul Ricard testing aerodynamic modifications on the TF103 car. Ferrari shook down the F2003-GA's electronic components and its setup at the Monza Circuit and its private Fiorano Circuit in Italy.

Michael Schumacher was the bookmakers' favourite to win the race. He said his team were prepared for the event and were motivated more after winning in Italy, adding: "Every tiny error has its consequences. Whoever is able to exploit the resources during the weekend will come out on top." Montoya felt convinced his car would perform well at Indianapolis because its engine was suited for IMS's main straight, and he anticipated a close duel with his championship rivals. He told reporters that he did not have to win the Grand Prix, just finish ahead of Michael Schumacher and Räikkönen to become World Champion in Japan. Räikkönen noted he had not yet finished a race at Indianapolis but said McLaren needed to attempt to be faster than Michael Schumacher and Montoya. He stated that the MP4-17D's characteristics would be better suited at Indianapolis than at Monza, and that he needed a strong finish late in the season to remain in contention for the championship.

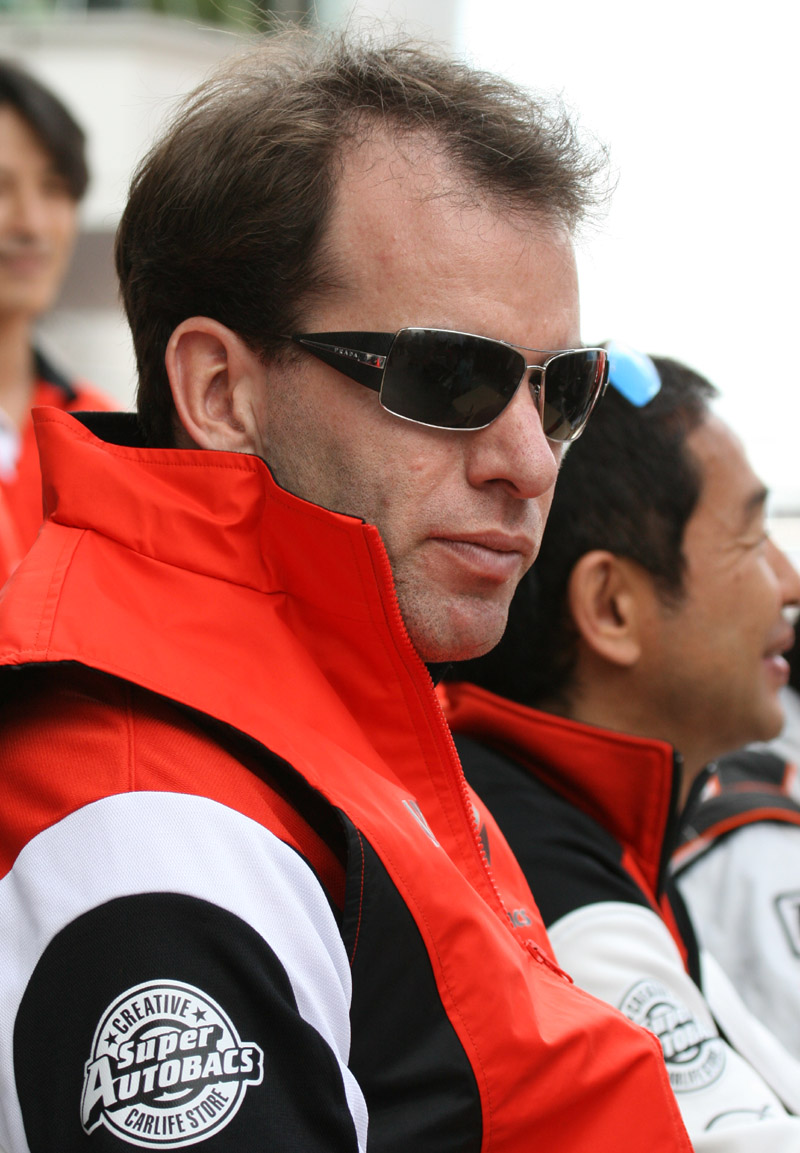
Ralph Firman (pictured in 2008) made his first Formula One race appearance since recovering from an inner ear imbalance

The Fédération Internationale de l'Automobile's (FIA; Formula One's governing body) president Max Mosley warned Ferrari, Williams, and McLaren and their drivers that any evidence of team orders in Indianapolis following their ban in October 2002 due to Barrichello being ordered to let teammate Michael Schumacher win the Austrian Grand Prix would be referred to the race stewards for thorough analysis. Ferrari technical director Ross Brawn argued that a driver who is not in championship contention should not interfere with another driver who is. Williams technical director Patrick Head stated that the team would let his drivers pass each other rather than the squad. McLaren owner Ron Dennis predicted that team orders would not be an issue in the final two races, expecting that teammates would help each other in the championship battle.

Because most teams were concentrating on the 2004 season, they did not make significant changes to their cars for the event. The three championship-contending teams in Ferrari, Williams and McLaren were the expectations. BMW and Ferrari brought enhanced versions of their engines as well as different aerodynamic car appendage changes. McLaren also made minor aerodynamic changes, and BAR was the only non-front-running team to bring an important innovation. Honda, BAR's engine supplier, presented an upgraded power unit and a new gearbox.

The event included ten constructors, each with two race drivers. Allan McNish (Renault), Björn Wirdheim (Jordan) and Gianmaria Bruni (Minardi) were the three drivers who drove a third car in only the Friday private test session. Ralph Firman returned to Jordan after Zsolt Baumgartner replaced him for the previous two rounds due to an inner ear imbalance Firman got in an accident during practice for the Hungarian Grand Prix two races earlier. BAR's Jenson Button was cleared to compete after a high-speed crash during testing in Jerez that forced him to visit a London hospital for a check-up. Ralf Schumacher returned to Williams after missing the Italian race due to a headache suffered during a test session at Monza, replacing test driver Marc Gené.

== Private test session ==
Teams that choose limited testing during the season were given a two-hour test session on Friday morning. The session took place in dry, cool weather, with a hint of drizzle in the second hour but not enough to disrupt operations. Renault's Jarno Trulli set the fastest lap time of 1:10.986, just 0.001 second faster than teammate Fernando Alonso. McNish was third, with Jaguar's Mark Webber fourth and Justin Wilson fifth. Some drivers went off the circuit during testing. A rubber seal came out of a crack between two concrete slabs on the main straight 19 minutes into the session, necessitating a four-minute stoppage to allow marshals to clear the debris.

== Practice and warm-up sessions ==
There were three practice sessions preceding Sunday's race: one 60-minute session on Friday morning and two 45-minute sessions on Saturday morning. The FIA moved the start time of all Saturday's events by an hour to better accommodate world television viewers due to the title duel. The area was cloudy as the first session began, and everyone wanted to get some running done as soon as possible. The rain fell steadily and intensified halfway through practice, and the FIA permitted teams to run extreme rain tyres to prepare for a probable wet-weather race. Trulli lapped fastest at 1:11.153, 0.186 seconds quicker than Ralf Schumacher in second. Panis, Barrichello, Michael Schumacher, Alonso, Webber, Montoya, Räikkönen and his teammate David Coulthard followed in the top ten. Jordan's Giancarlo Fisichella's engine failed on the exit of turn 12 and spilled oil onto the banked turn 13 after 22 minutes, stopping practice. His car stopped on the main straight with smoke billowing from it, prompting its removal from the circuit to the pit lane and oil cleaning by marshals. The work took almost 20 minutes to allow the session to resume. Fisichella's teammate Firman stopped in the gravel at the exit of turn ten towards the session's end.

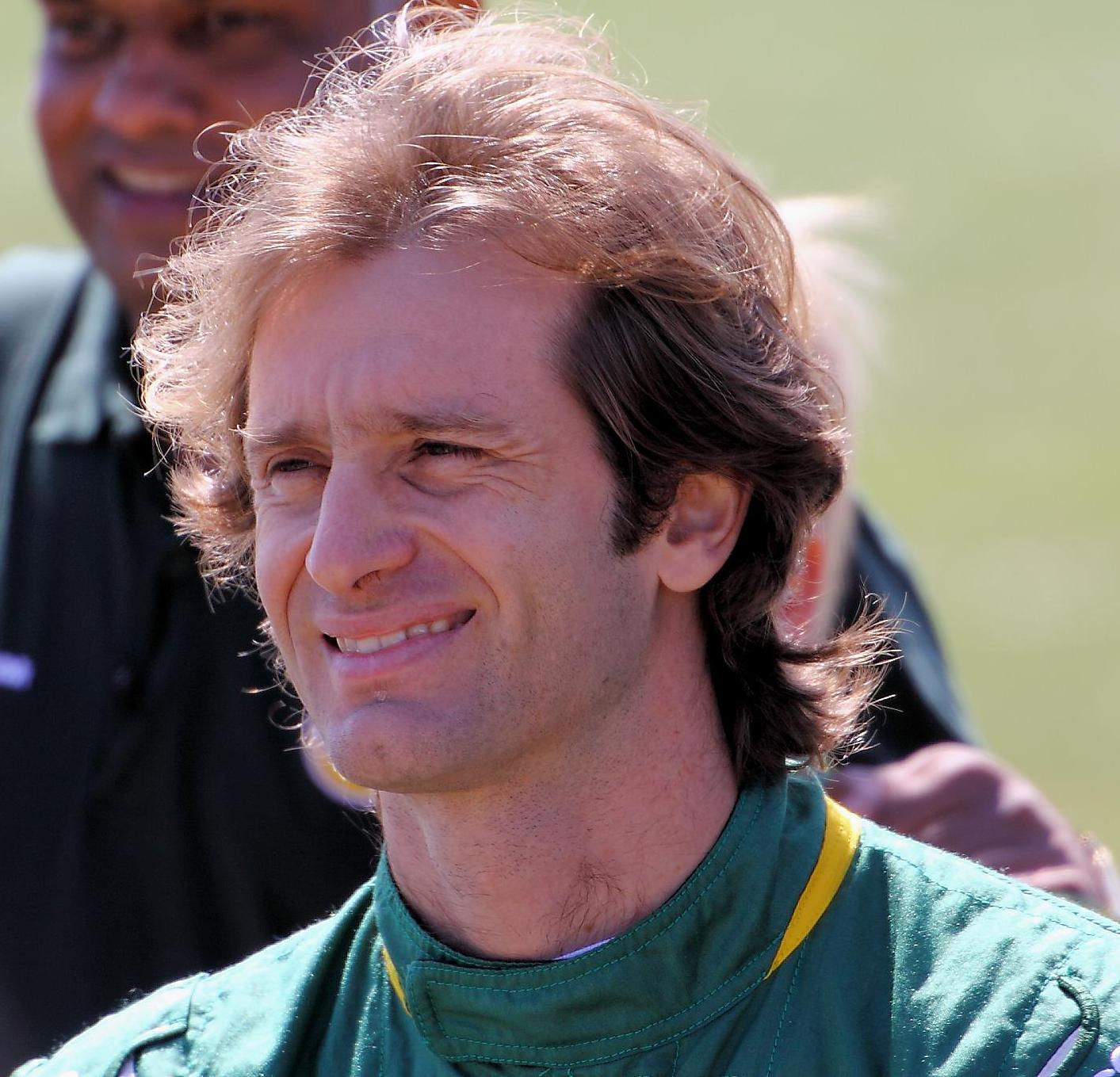
Jarno Trulli (pictured in 2011) was competitive in practice and fastest in the first qualifying session.

The second practice session was held on a circuit in cool, overcast weather with damp parts due to nighttime rain and electrical thunderstorms. The sun later shined on the circuit and it began drying. Trulli maintained his pace with a lap of 1:12.408, ahead of Ralf Schumacher, Montoya, Barrichello, Alonso, Toyota's Cristiano da Matta, Panis, Sauber's Heinz-Harald Frentzen and the Jaguar pair of Webber and Wilson. A fuel pressure issue caused Michael Schumacher to stop his Ferrari on his installation lap at turn nine two minutes into the session and marshals removed the car from the track. Air and track temperatures rose for the final practice session. Barrichello's lap of 1:11.112 was fastest, 0.012 seconds faster than second-placed Trulli. Michael Schumacher, Montoya, Coulthard, Räikkönen, Panis, Webber, Ralf Schumacher and Alonso were in positions three through ten. Ralf Schumacher outbraked himself into turn eight, slid through the wet grass, and damaged his car's right side hitting the tyre wall. The waving of yellow flags briefly disrupted on-circuit activities. Da Matta's engine failed going through turn 12, laying oil across that corner and the pit lane entry.

Alonso set the quickest lap time of 1:12.079 in the 15-minute warm-up session that preceded the final qualifying session in partly cloudy weather, followed by Montoya, Panis, Räikkönen, Barrichello, Da Matta, Coulthard, Ralf Schumacher and Webber. Trulli's Renault suffered front and right-hand damage in two minor crashes with the turn 11 tyre wall late in the session.

== Qualifying ==
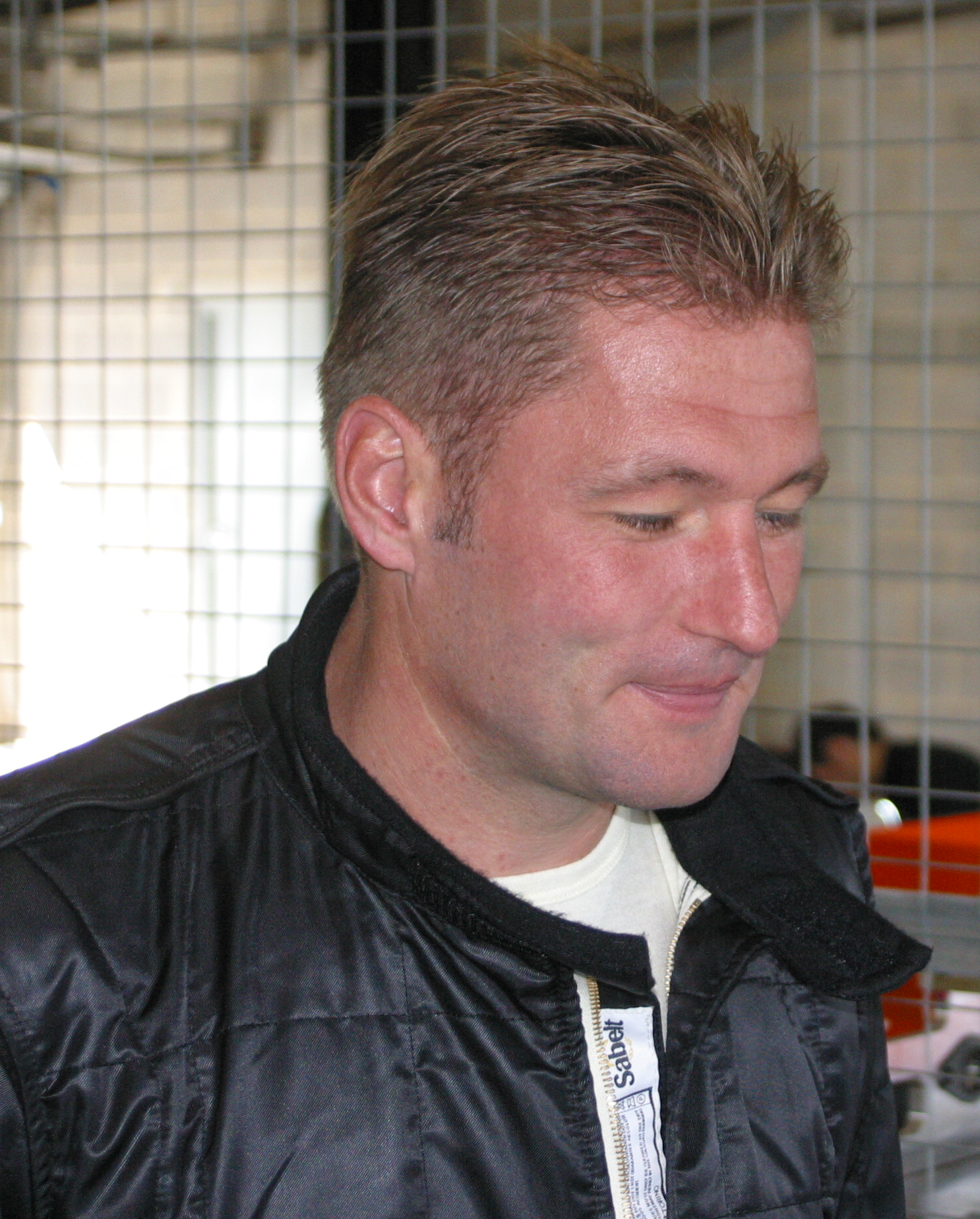
Jos Verstappen (pictured in 2005) was the only driver not to record a lap in the first qualifying session.

There were two one-hour qualifying sessions on both Friday and Saturday afternoons. The World Drivers' Championship standings determined the running order for the first session (first to last), with the second session's running order reversed from the result of the first session (slowest to quickest). In each session, each driver recorded one timed lap with no other cars on track, and the starting order was set by the quickest laps in the second session. The circuit was entirely dry, with all tyre rubber removed after the rain shower in the first practice session. Rain began to fall on IMS halfway through the first qualifying session and intensified, prompting drivers to be cautious; the FIA allowed extreme rain tyres to be used for the rest of qualifying. Michelin-shod cars were more competitive in the session than Bridgestone-shod cars because their new front tyres performed better in cooler temperatures. Trulli, who was fastest in the infield section, took provisional pole position with a lap of 1:09.566 with Barrichello 0.269 seconds slower in second. Webber was unaffected by the rain and pished hard to go third. Ralf Schumacher was fourth after braking too late for the first corner due to understeer. Montoya, fifth, braked too soon for some turns, losing time. Coulthard, sixth, went sideways through turn 13 before starting his lap. Alonso was hampered by understeer that was better dealt with on a low fuel load and was seventh. Michael Schumacher ran wide at the exit of turn one and took eighth. Räikkönen, ninth, lost control of his car early in his lap, while Button, tenth, was the last driver unaffected by the rain. Da Matta was the faster Toyota in 11th, ahead of Fisichella's Jordan in 12th due to the circuit being slightly wet on the latter's lap. Frentzen finished 13th on dry tyres after much of the track got wet halfway through his lap. Panis, 14th, saw the rain get heavier on his lap. The change in conditions caught out Sauber's Nick Heidfeld and BAR's Jacques Villeneuve, who came 15th and 16th, respectively. Firman's team, 17th, put extreme rain tyres on his car. Wilson was 18th, ahead of Minardi's Nicolas Kiesa, who came 19th in his first wet Formula One session. Kiesa's teammate Jos Verstappen was the only driver to not set a lap time due to a traction control system interface issue between the electronic control unit and the engine. Minardi called Verstappen into the pit lane to abandon his qualifying lap.

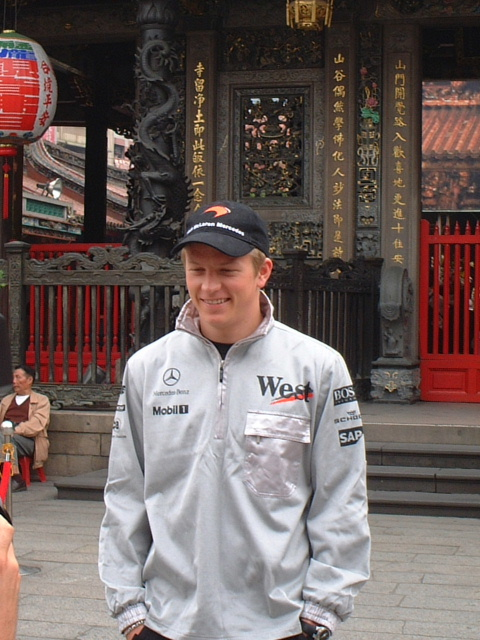
Kimi Räikkönen (pictured in 2002) took the second pole position of his career in the second qualifying session.

The second qualifying session was held in dry, warm, partly cloudy conditions. Räikkönen was the 12th driver to set a time, and his lap of 1:11.670 earned him his second career pole position. He was joined on the grid's front row by Barrichello, who was 0.124 seconds slower. Panis had a clean effort and his engine meant he achieved Toyota's best qualifying result at the time in third. Montoya clipped a kerb, oversteered for most of the lap, and tyre fading cost him three-tenths of a second and dropped him to fourth. Excessive oversteer left Montoya's teammate Ralf Schumacher in fifth, losing control of his car at turn one after finishing his lap. Alonso in sixth had handling problems that saw him oversteer and understeer in the track's turns. Michael Schumacher's Ferrari lacked grip and had handling issues as he appeared to commit small driver errors en route to seventh. A minor oversteer in turn four and understeer in turn eight left Coulthard eighth. Da Matta drove the spare Toyota setup for him after his engine overheated during the warm-up session. He hit the kerbs to increase speed and took ninth. Trulli's car was rebuilt by the Renault mechanics and he made minor errors on his lap, leaving him 10th. Button and Villeneuve of BAR qualified 11th and 12th, respectively, with the team adjusting their setups to improve the driveability and grip of their cars. Heidfeld was 13th when his tyres began graining at the end of his lap. Webber's Jaguar lacked grip and balance due to his car carrying a heavy fuel load, causing him to understeer and come 14th. Frentzen, 15th, ran wide in turn six and lost time. Wilson's car suffered understeer due to the changing track conditions, and he qualified 16th. Jordan teammates Fisichella and Firman finished 17th and 18th, respectively, due to a lack of grip in their rain setup cars. Minardi teammates Verstappen (19th) and Kiesa (20th) completed the starting order, with both cars carrying a heavy fuel load, resulting in significant oversteer and poor rear-end handling.

=== Qualifying classification ===
Pos	No.	Driver	Constructor	Q1 Time	Q2 Time	Gap	Grid
1	6	(Finland) Kimi Räikkönen	McLaren-Mercedes	1:10.756	1:11.670		1
2	2	(Brazil) Rubens Barrichello	Ferrari	1:09.835	1:11.794	+0.124	2
3	20	(France) Olivier Panis	Toyota	1:17.666	1:11.920	+0.250	3
4	3	(Colombia) Juan Pablo Montoya	Williams-BMW	1:10.372	1:11.948	+0.278	4
5	4	(Germany) Ralf Schumacher	Williams-BMW	1:10.222	1:12.078	+0.408	5
6	8	(Spain) Fernando Alonso	Renault	1:10.556	1:12.087	+0.417	6
7	1	(Germany) Michael Schumacher	Ferrari	1:10.736	1:12.194	+0.524	7
8	5	(United Kingdom) David Coulthard	McLaren-Mercedes	1:10.450	1:12.297	+0.627	8
9	21	(Brazil) Cristiano da Matta	Toyota	1:11.949	1:12.326	+0.656	9
10	7	(Italy) Jarno Trulli	Renault	1:09.566	1:12.566	+0.896	10
11	17	(United Kingdom) Jenson Button	BAR-Honda	1:11.847	1:12.695	+1.025	11
12	16	(Canada) Jacques Villeneuve	BAR-Honda	1:18.547	1:13.050	+1.380	12
13	9	(Germany) Nick Heidfeld	Sauber-Petronas	1:17.768	1:13.083	+1.413	13
14	14	(Australia) Mark Webber	Jaguar-Cosworth	1:10.081	1:13.269	+1.599	14
15	10	(Germany) Heinz-Harald Frentzen	Sauber-Petronas	1:13.541	1:13.447	+1.777	15
16	15	(United Kingdom) Justin Wilson	Jaguar-Cosworth	1:19.491	1:13.585	+1.915	16
17	11	(Italy) Giancarlo Fisichella	Jordan-Ford	1:12.227	1:13.798	+2.128	17
18	12	(Republic of Ireland) Ralph Firman	Jordan-Ford	1:19.383	1:14.027	+2.357	18
19	19	(Netherlands) Jos Verstappen	Minardi-Cosworth	No time^{1}	1:15.360	+3.690	19
20	18	(Denmark) Nicolas Kiesa	Minardi-Cosworth	1:21.973	1:15.644	+3.974	20

Notes

- ^1 – Jos Verstappen was left without a time in Q1, due to an electronic issue in the car.

== Race ==
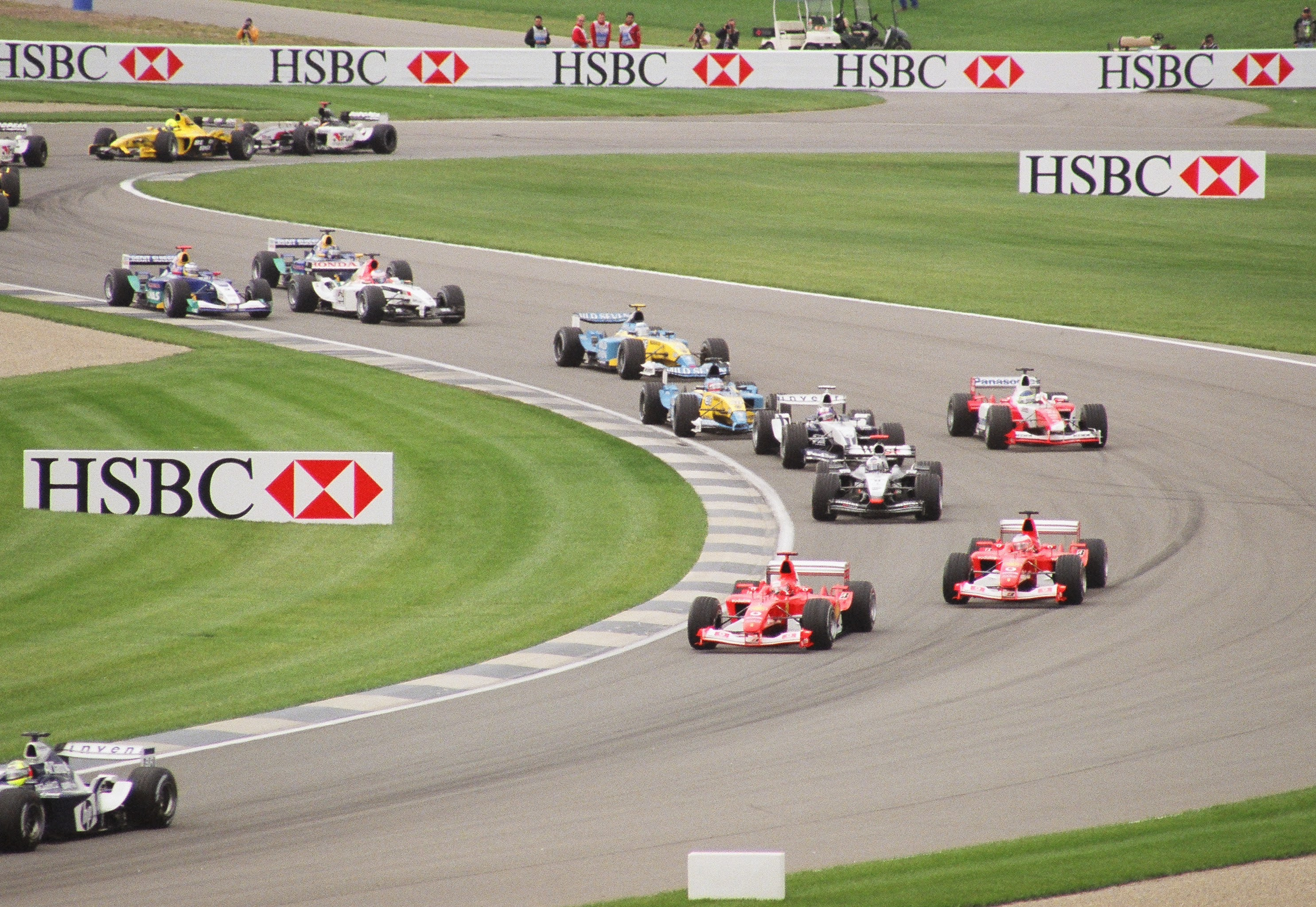
The start of the race

The race began at 13:00 local time before an estimated 120,000 spectators. A brief rain shower began falling on the circuit before the race and suddenly developed to heavier rain with hail stones, making the track damp before drying up. The weather was cloudy with the ambient temperature at 13 to 17 °C (55 to 63 °F) and the track temperature 16 to 20 °C (61 to 68 °F); a 30 percent chance of rain was forecast. Every driver started on dry-weather compound tyres. When the five red lights went out to begin the race from its standing start, Räikkönen made a clean start to hold the lead into turn one. Panis passed the slow-starting Barrichello to take second as the latter had an automatic gearchange upshift glitch that prompted him to change gears manually. In turn nine, Kiesa collided with Firman's rear and had an unscheduled pit stop for a replacement front wing. Michael Schumacher moved from seventh to fourth, while Montoya slid from fourth to seventh before the first lap's end.

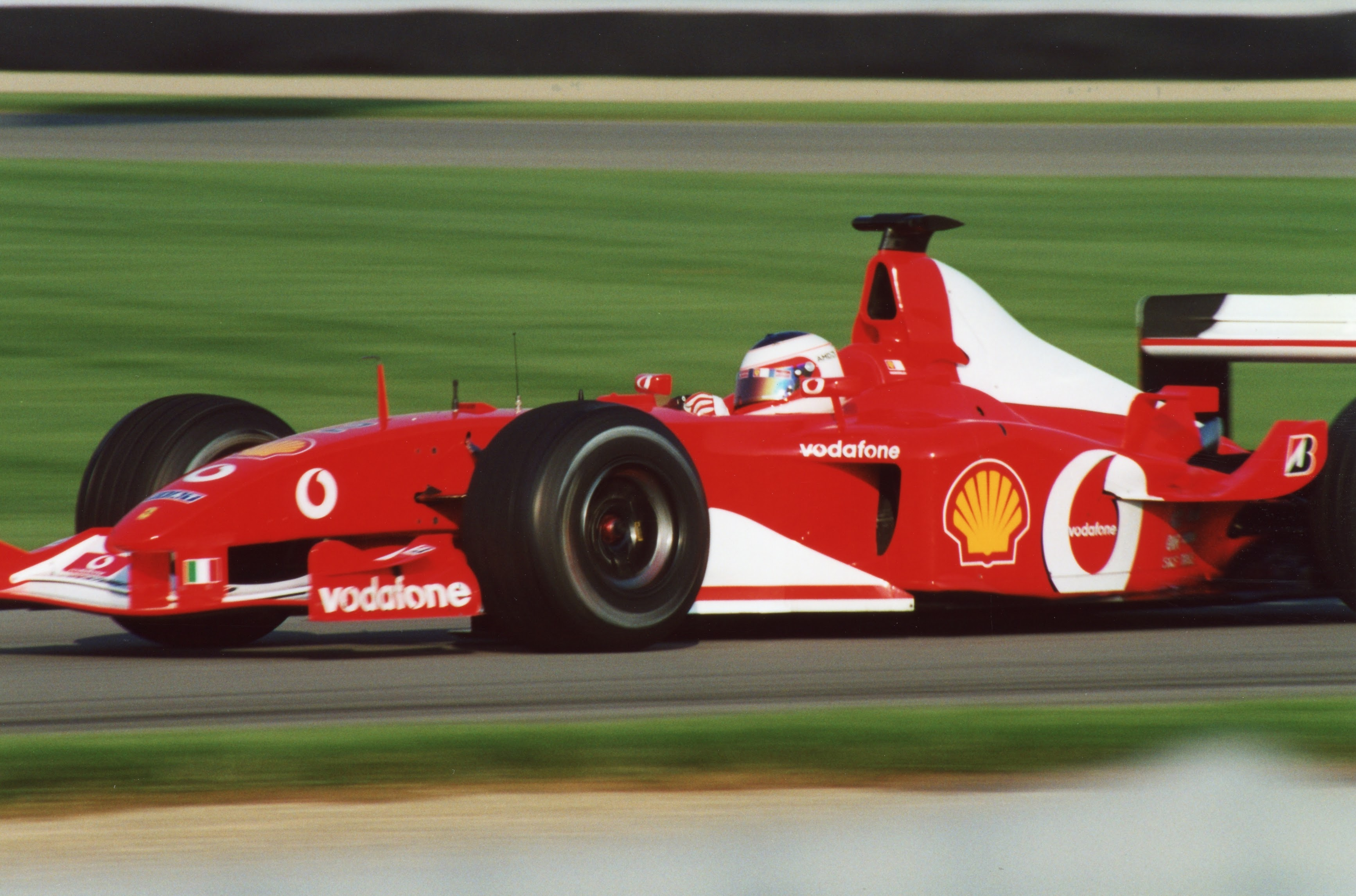
Rubens Barrichello retired after two laps due to a collision with Juan Pablo Montoya

Räikkönen led Panis by 1.6 seconds at the end of lap one, with Ralf Schumacher third. Coulthard overtook Barrichello on the inside at turn one for fifth. Light rain began falling on parts of the track on the second lap. Ralf Schumacher used the better horsepower of his engine to pass Panis for second on the main straight to begin lap three. Montoya was close behind Barrichello and went to the inside of him after braking for the complex of turns following the main straight. In turn two, they were alongside each other when Montoya was pushed onto the kerb by Barrichello. This saw Montoya's right front wheel and Barrichello's left rear wheel collide, sending Barrichello into the gravel trap and into retirement. Montoya fell to eighth, behind both Renaults. He overtook Trulli for seventh on lap four as Michael Schumacher gained on Panis.

At the start of lap five, Michael Schumacher moved out of Panis's slipstream and overtook him on the inside of the main straight's centre into turn one for third. As he finished the overtake, yellow flags were being waved at turns one and two to help remove Barrichello's car from the gravel. After McLaren checked camera evidence, Dennis talked with the race director regarding the pass, but the FIA stewards did not penalise Michael Schumacher with a drive-through penalty, ruling that he completed the manoeuvre shortly before entering the yellow flag zone. McLaren and Williams did not protest the decision. On the same lap, the rain intensified, allowing Alonso to pass Coulthard for fifth. Panis was the first front runner to make a pit stop for intermediate tyres at the end of lap six as the rain became harder. Panis fell to 15th after being seven seconds slow leaving his pit stall.

An error by Alonso dropped him behind Coulthard and Montoya on that lap. Michael Schumacher was passed for third on the inside on the main straight by Coulthard on lap seven, as his Bridgestone grooved tyres performed worse than the Michelins in the changing track conditions. Soon after, Montoya attempted an unsuccessful overtake on Michael Schumacher. Montoya overtook Michael Schumacher for fourth place on the outside of the banked turn 13 on lap seven, as the rain began to ease slightly. Michael Schumacher then lost fifth to Alonso. The track began to dry from lap eight, when the stewards announced Montoya was being investigated for his third lap incident with Barrichello and perhaps passing a slower car in yellow flags. Drivers who made pit stops for rain tyres made further pit stops to switch to dry compound tyres as the track dried.

Ralf Schumacher began closing up on race leader Räikkönen on lap 10, pulling to within a second of him by the 14th lap. Coulthard, Montoya and Alonso were close behind each other as all three duelled for third with the circuit now completely dry. Michael Schumacher set the race's fastest lap of 1:11.473 on lap 13. On lap 15, Montoya overtook Coulthard for third at turn one, before Alonso passed Coulthard for fourth three turns later. Ralf Schumacher made his first scheduled pit stop at the end of that lap. He rejoined the track in 12th. During lap 17, Coulthard was pressured by Michael Schumacher between turns two and three. Montoya and Coulthard made their first pit stops for fuel and tyres when the lap ended. Montoya lost time when the refuelling hose nozzle failed to attach the first time, necessitating a switch to a backup system. He fell behind Coulthard and into 11th.

On lap 18, light rain returned to the circuit before intensifying on the next lap. This made cars difficult to drive, and team managers tried to mitigate the effects of the changing conditions by predicting whether the track would remain wet or dry. Alonso, Räikkönen and Michael Schumacher made pit stops to remain on dry-weather tyres over laps 18 to 20. Because of the activity in the pit lane, Webber led the race for two laps, with Button second and Wilson third as the rain continued to get heavier. On lap 21, Button lost control of his car on the wet track, and Wilson moved into second place as drivers began stopping for rain tyres. Michael Schumacher, who had proposed switching to rain tyres during his first pit stop, was asked by Brawn to enter the pit lane for intermediate tyres on lap 22. After analysing video footage, the stewards imposed a drive-through penalty on Montoya after deciding that he caused the crash with Barrichello.

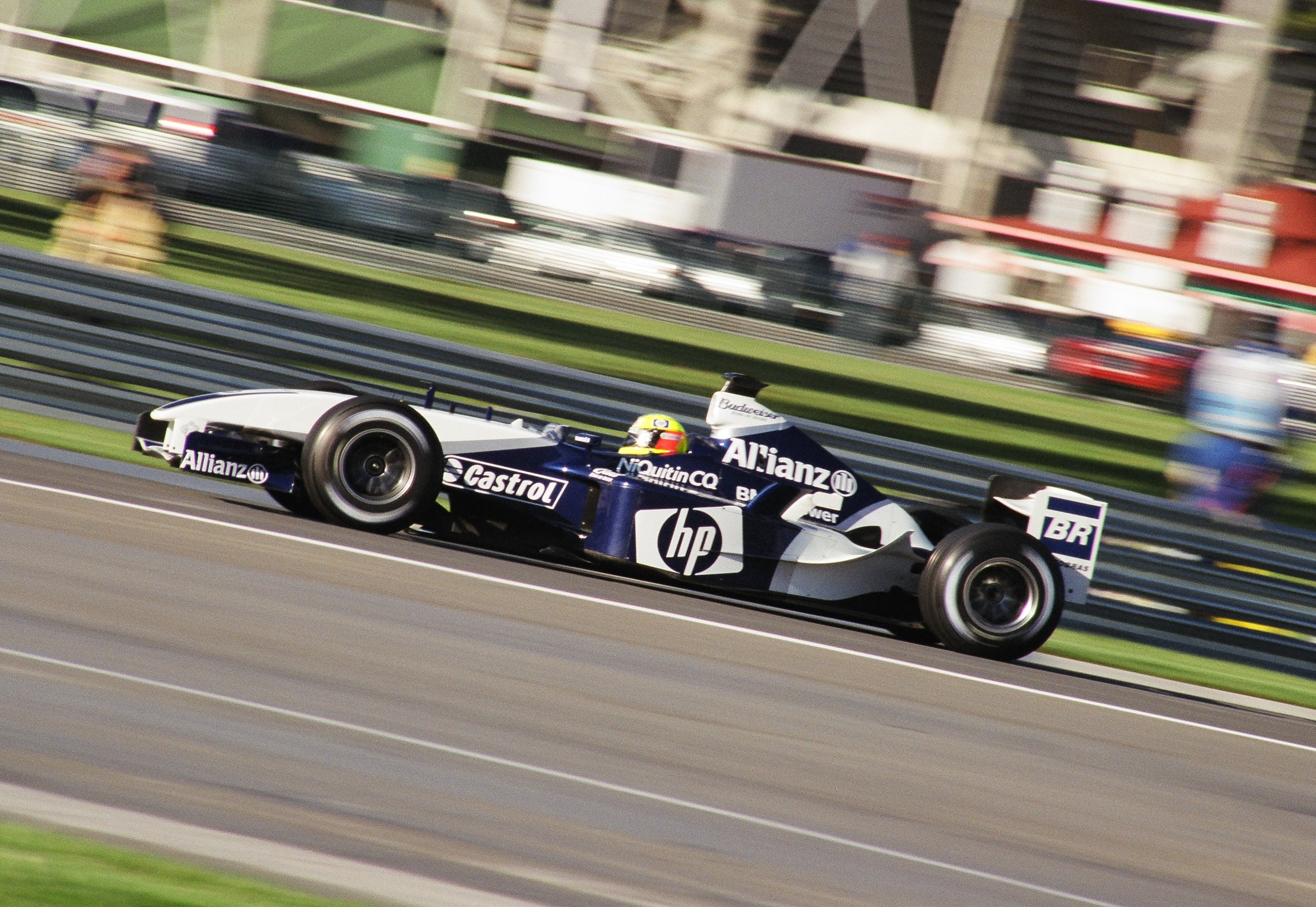
Ralf Schumacher retired on lap 22 after an accident at turn eight.

Ralf Schumacher stayed on the track for one extra lap due to a radio miscommunication with his team. He lost traction on the wet grass and crashed backwards into the turn eight tyre barrier. He retired the car with rear suspension damage on the turn's run-off area. Webber's visibility was limited due to his visor steaming up, and he lost control of his Jaguar on dry tyres. He hit the turn eight tyre barrier with his car's front and retired. Montoya served his drive-through penalty on lap 22 while Coulthard led one lap before going off the track. Button and Frentzen gained the most from the rain since they had switched to rain tyres at their first pit stops and held first and second, with Michael Schumacher gaining on the leaders. On lap 23, Montoya went off the circuit at turn eight and onto the grass before another pit stop for the full rain tyres, dropping to 11th. Button began pulling away from Frentzen in second as the Bridgestone tyres outperformed the Michelins in the wet. Wilson dropped from third to sixth in three laps when Räikkönen, Michael Schumacher and Alonso passed him.

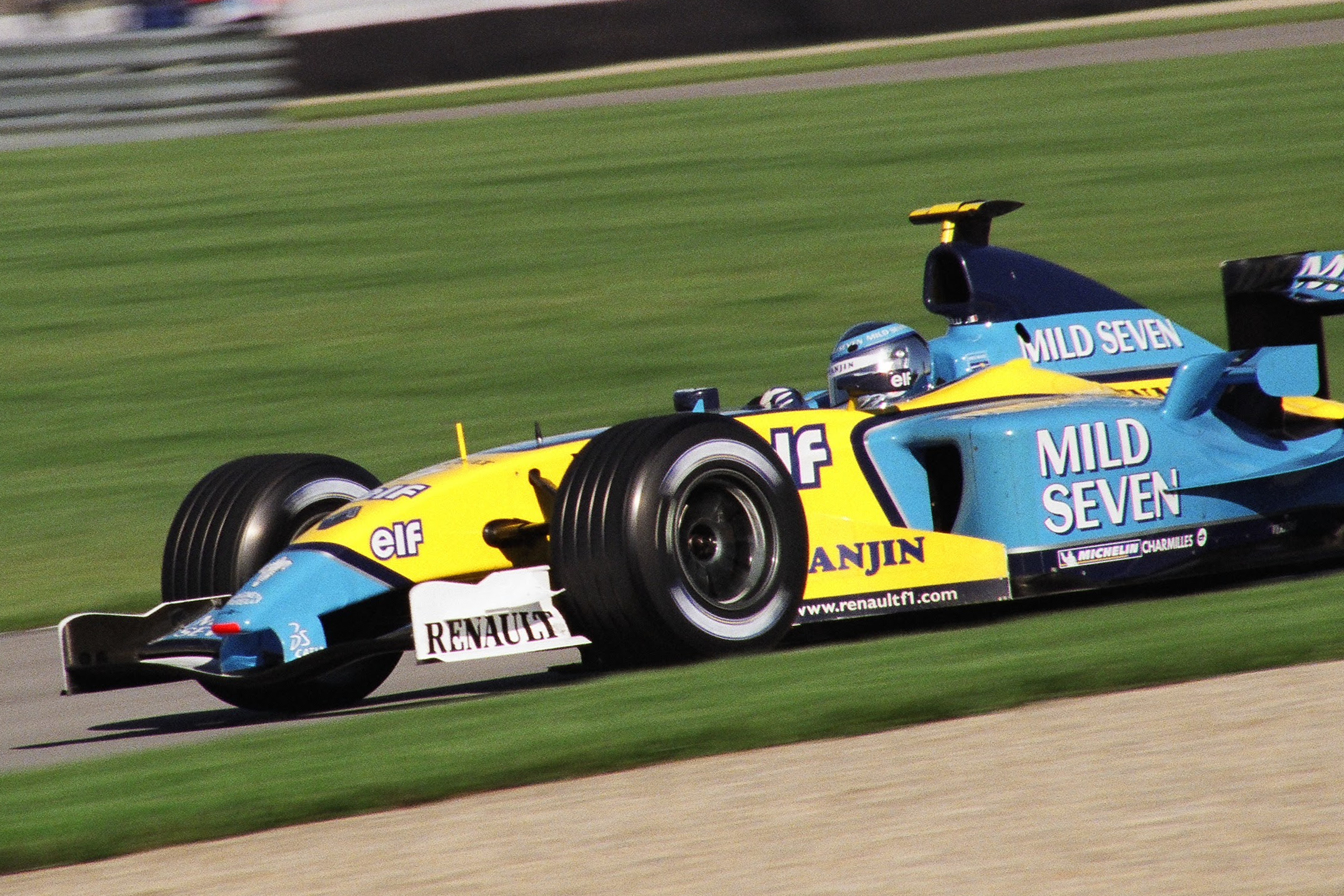
Jarno Trulli finished in fourth position in his Renault.

On lap 28, Michael Schumacher overtook Räikkönen at the end of the back straight into turn eight for third as the rain subsided. Panis lost control of his Toyota and crashed into the turn seven tyre wall two laps later, ending his race. Coulthard continued to drive on dry tyres after going off the track at turn eight on lap 32. During lap 33, Michael Schumacher caught Frentzen and overtook him without much defence at the end of the back straight for second place so that he could begin closing up to race leader Button. He ran off the racing line at the next corner but remained in second. Heidfeld passed Alonso at turn eight for fifth two laps later. Michael Schumacher closed up to Button and overtook him on the inside for the race lead at turn one on lap 38. He began to gradually pull away from Button as drivers began making more pit stops to change to the dry compound tyres. On lap 42, Button pulled over to the side of the main straight with smoke billoiwing from his engine due to a loss of hydraulic pressure, something BAR were aware of but were unable to rectify. His retirement promoted Frentzen to second position, Heidfeld to third and Räikkönen to fourth. Smoke billowed from Alonso's engine between turns eight and nine, forcing him to retire on lap 47. Michael Schumacher made his third pit stop for fuel and dry tyres at the end of lap 48, giving Frentzen the race lead.

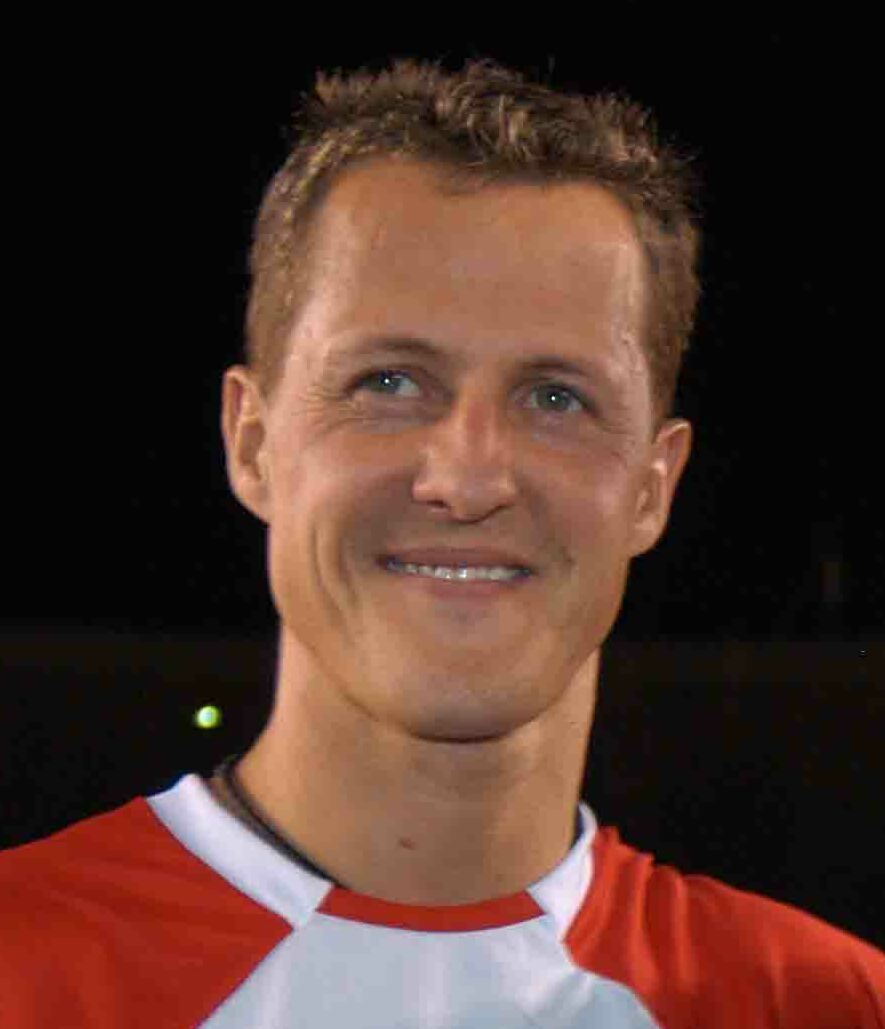
Michael Schumacher (pictured in 2005) took his sixth victory of the season to increase his World Drivers' Championship lead to nine championship points over Räikkönen.

Frentzen made his second pit stop for fuel and tyres at the conclusion of the 49th lap and rejoined the race in third. Coulthard retired in the McLaren garage one lap later with a gearbox control unit failure. Heidfeld made his final pit stop on lap 51, dropping to fourth and moving teammate Frentzen to second and Räikkönen to third, who was closing in on Frentzen. Firman lost control of his car in turn seven on the 53rd lap after hitting a plastic kerb at turn seven. He retired from the race due to front wheel and fuel problems. Fisichella's slower car delayed Frentzen, allowing Räikkönen to reduce the gap and overtake him on the inside into turn one for second at the start of lap 55. Eight laps later, Trulli caught and overtook Heidfeld for fourth. Villeneuve retired from the race on lap 66, with smoke and fire erupting from the rear of his car into turn eight, ending a possible duel with Wilson for eighth. Two laps later, Montoya used Heidfeld's slipstream to pass Fisichella for sixth.

Michael Schumacher led the final 24 laps to earn his sixth victory of the season and the 70th of his career. Räikkönen came in second 18.2 seconds later, and Frentzen finished third, his first podium result since the 2000 United States Grand Prix. Trulli was fourth, while Heidfeld finished fifth, his best result of the season. Montoya finished a lap down in sixth, ahead of Fisichella in seventh, his second points finish of the season after winning the Brazilian Grand Prix. Despite driving over a Jaguar mechanic during a pit stop, Wilson finished eighth, earning him his first career championship point. Da Matta finished ninth after serving a drive-through penalty handed by the stewards for speeding in the pit lane. The Minardi team of Verstappen and Kiesa finished in 10th and 11th, four laps down. The attrition rate was high, with just 11 of the 20 starters finishing the race.

=== Post-race ===
The top three drivers appeared on the podium to collect their trophies and spoke to the media in the subsequent press conference. Michael Schumacher admitted that tyres played a role in the final result and stated that he was not surprised to finish in the top three because he knew he would gain positions regardless of his starting position. Räikkönen said he lost the race due to changing weather conditions and admitted he was slightly disappointed to finish second, adding, "I was fighting as much as I could. We only got second place. Of course, it's not the best, because Michael won, and we came second for the championship." Frentzen was ecstatic to finish third despite the fact that frequent podium finishes were not his team's goal for the season, and he stated he decided to ask his team to swap to wet-weather tyres after glancing at the sky and predicting a long period of rain.

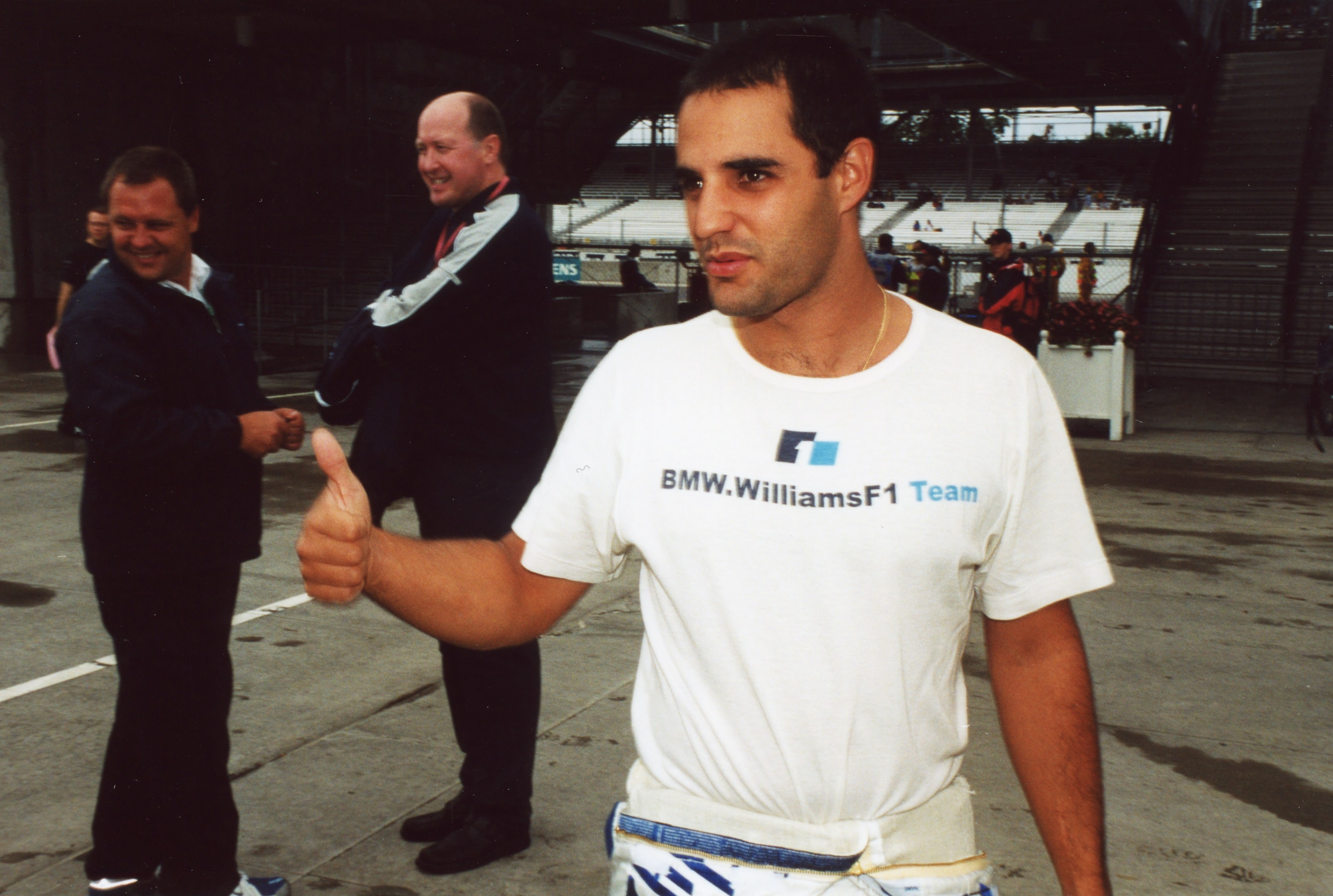
Juan Pablo Montoya (pictured in 2002) was eliminated from championship contention after finishing sixth in the race

Because he was upset over being eliminated from title contention, Montoya did not talk to the press immediately after the race. He said four days later that it took him two days to realise he could not win the championship and that he could have finished second or third without the drive-through penalty. After reviewing video footage of the third lap crash, Barrichello felt he had given Montoya enough room, saying, "I went into the corner and all of a sudden, I felt a bang. I had given him space into Turn 2, running on the outside, just hoping to get better traction." Trulli blamed his poor qualifying performance on his lack of a better finish, but he felt his car improved throughout the race and he attacked regardless of the conditions. Button called his lap 42 retirement the "worst feeling" in his career, "When things are going well and you suddenly have a problem like that it's a nightmare. It's four years now and we still haven't had a podium."

According to Michelin motorsport director Pierre Dupasquier, the company needed to improve its rain tyres in the off-season after being slower than Bridgestone tyres in wet conditions, "The lessons learned will help us to strengthen our all-round performance and that will be a great source of motivation." The weather, according to Brawn, was critical to winning the race, whereas Williams chief operations engineer Sam Michael said his team had made numerous mistakes in their strategy and that they would review them. Wilson was pleased to get his first career points in the race, crediting his eighth-place finish to his team's race strategy and pit stops, "It has been a tough few months for me but I knew that my luck would change at some point." Fisichella stated that his seventh-place finish was positive because Jordan did not anticipate to win championship points given the car's pace and starting position. Verstappen accused Firman of denying him a championship point.

Michael Schumacher's victory put him nine championship points ahead of Räikkönen in the World Drivers' Championship, with 92 championship points to the latter's 83 championship points. Montoya was 10 championship points behind Michael Schumacher, and finishing sixth meant he was mathematically eliminated from title contention. Because both Ralf Schumacher in fourth and Barrichello in fifth failed to finish the race, neither improved their championship points total. Ferrari retook the World Constructors' Championship lead with 147 championship points, three more than previous leaders Williams. McLaren were third with 128 championship points, with Renault fourth with 84 points. Sauber scored ten championship points to increase their total to 19, moving them from ninth to fifth with one race of the season remaining.

=== Race classification ===
Drivers who scored championship points are denoted in bold.

Pos	No.	Driver	Constructor	Tyre	Laps	Time/Retired	Grid	Points
1	1	(Germany) **Michael Schumacher**	**Ferrari**	B	73	1:33:35.997	7	10
2	6	(Finland) **Kimi Räikkönen**	**McLaren-Mercedes**	M	73	+18.258	1	8
3	10	(Germany) **Heinz-Harald Frentzen**	**Sauber-Petronas**	B	73	+37.964	15	6
4	7	(Italy) **Jarno Trulli**	**Renault**	M	73	+48.329	10	5
5	9	(Germany) **Nick Heidfeld**	**Sauber-Petronas**	B	73	+56.403	13	4
6	3	(Colombia) **Juan Pablo Montoya**	**Williams-BMW**	M	72	+1 Lap	4	3
7	11	(Italy) **Giancarlo Fisichella**	**Jordan-Ford**	B	72	+1 Lap	17	2
8	15	(United Kingdom) **Justin Wilson**	**Jaguar-Cosworth**	M	71	+2 Laps	16	1
9	21	(Brazil) Cristiano da Matta	Toyota	M	71	+2 Laps	9	
10	19	(Netherlands) Jos Verstappen	Minardi-Cosworth	B	69	+4 Laps	19	
11	18	(Denmark) Nicolas Kiesa	Minardi-Cosworth	B	69	+4 Laps	20	
Ret	16	(Canada) Jacques Villeneuve	BAR-Honda	B	63	Engine	12	
Ret	12	(Republic of Ireland) Ralph Firman	Jordan-Ford	B	48	Spun off	18	
Ret	5	(United Kingdom) David Coulthard	McLaren-Mercedes	M	45	Gearbox	8	
Ret	8	(Spain) Fernando Alonso	Renault	M	44	Engine	6	
Ret	17	(United Kingdom) Jenson Button	BAR-Honda	B	41	Engine	11	
Ret	20	(France) Olivier Panis	Toyota	M	27	Accident	3	
Ret	14	(Australia) Mark Webber	Jaguar-Cosworth	M	21	Spin	14	
Ret	4	(Germany) Ralf Schumacher	Williams-BMW	M	21	Accident	5	
Ret	2	(Brazil) Rubens Barrichello	Ferrari	B	2	Collision/Spun off	2	

== Championship standings after the race ==
Drivers' Championship standings

+/–	Pos	Driver	Points
	1	(Germany) Michael Schumacher*	92
1	2	(Finland) Kimi Räikkönen*	83
1	3	(Colombia) Juan Pablo Montoya	82
	4	(Germany) Ralf Schumacher	58
	5	(Brazil) Rubens Barrichello	55

Constructors' Championship standings

+/–	Pos	Constructor	Points
1	1	(Italy) Ferrari*	147
1	2	(United Kingdom) Williams-BMW*	144
	3	(United Kingdom) McLaren-Mercedes	128
	4	(France) Renault	84
4	5	(Switzerland) Sauber-Petronas	19
Sources:

- Note: Only the top five positions are included for both sets of standings.
- Bold text and an asterisk indicates competitors who still had a theoretical chance of becoming World Champion.

Previous race: 2003 Italian Grand Prix	FIA Formula One World Championship; 2003 season	Next race: 2003 Japanese Grand Prix
Previous race: 2002 United States Grand Prix	United States Grand Prix	Next race: 2004 United States Grand Prix
