= Toyota TF104 =

Formula One Car for 2004 season

Toyota TF104 Toyota TF104B
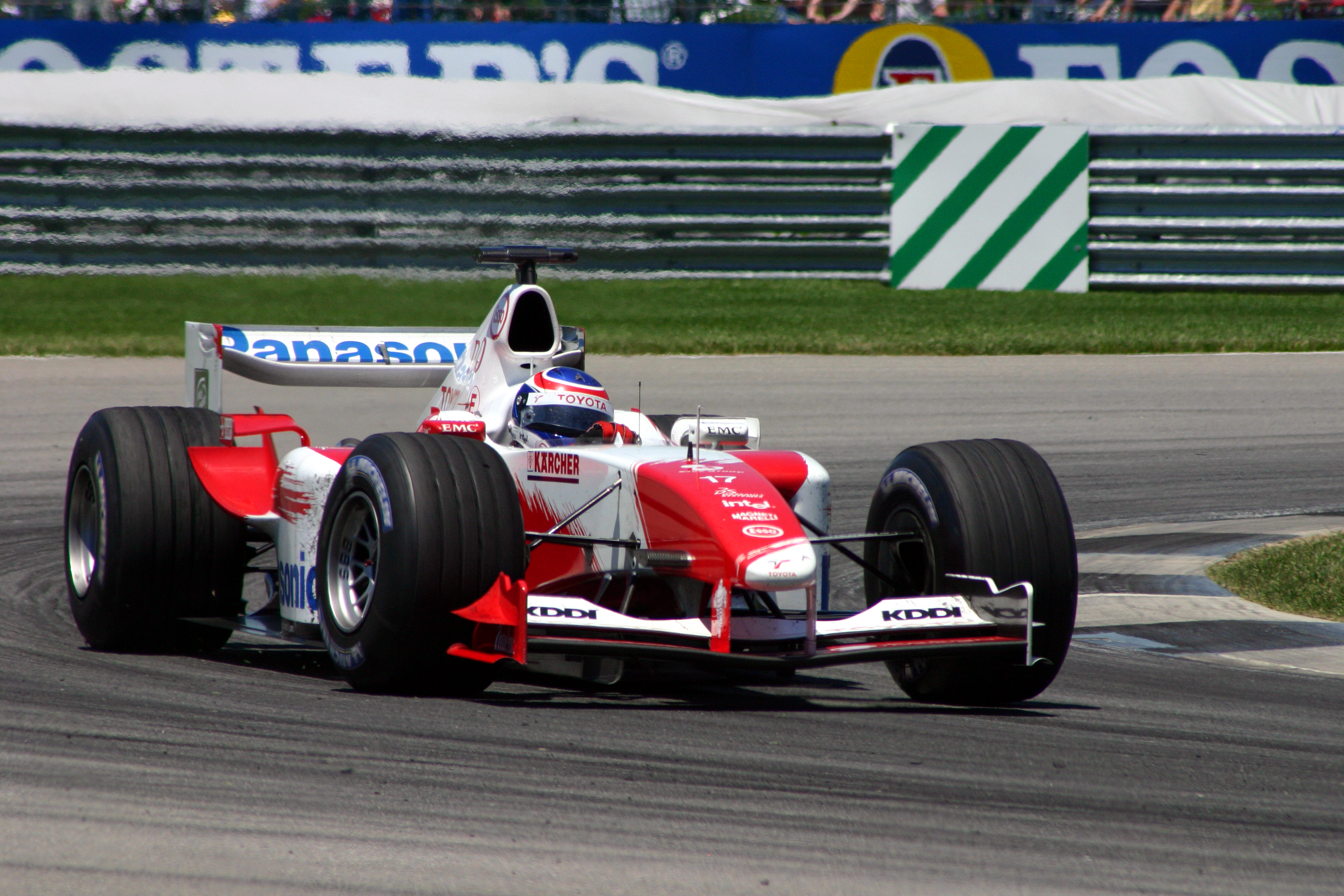
- Olivier Panis driving the Toyota TF104 at the United States Grand Prix
- Category: Formula One
- Constructor: Toyota
- Designers: Keizo Takahashi (Technical Director); Gustav Brunner (Chief Designer); Paul White (Deputy Chief Designer); Olivier Hulot (Head of Electronics); René Hilhorst (Head of Aerodynamics); Luca Marmorini (Engine Director); Hiroshi Yajima (Chief Designer, Engine)
- Predecessor: TF103
- Successor: TF105

Technical specifications
- Chassis: Carbon-fibre and honeycomb composite monocoque
- Suspension (front): Pushrod with torsion bar. Shock absorbers supplied by Sachs
- Suspension (rear): As front
- Length: 4,627 mm (182.17 in)
- Width: 1,800 mm (70.87 in)
- Height: 950 mm (37.40 in)
- Axle track: Front: 1,425 mm (56.10 in); Rear: 1,411 mm (55.55 in)
- Wheelbase: 3,090 mm (121.65 in)
- Engine: Toyota RVX-04 3.0 litres (183 cubic inches) 72-degree V10 naturally-aspirated mid-engined and longitudinally-mounted
- Transmission: Toyota 7-speed with 1 reverse sequential semi-automatic with limited-slip differential
- Battery: Panasonic lead acid 12 volts
- Power: Around 900 bhp (671 kW) @ 19,000 rpm
- Weight: 600 kg (1,323 lb) including driver and fuel
- Fuel: Esso
- Lubricants: Esso
- Brakes: Carbon-carbon ventilated front and rear discs + pads + calipers (all supplied by Brembo)
- Tyres: Michelin Pilot Sport F1 with BBS magnesium wheels

Competition history
- Notable entrants: Panasonic Toyota Racing
- Notable drivers: 16. (Brazil) Cristiano da Matta; 16/17. (Brazil) Ricardo Zonta; 16. (Italy) Jarno Trulli; 17. (France) Olivier Panis
- Debut: 2004 Australian Grand Prix
- Last event: 2004 Brazilian Grand Prix
Races	Wins	Poles	F/Laps
18	0	0	0
- Constructors' Championships: 0
- Drivers' Championships: 0

The Toyota TF104 was a Formula One car used by the Toyota F1 team during the 2004 Formula One season.

The car was the third and final Gustav Brunner and René Hilhorst designed Toyota in Formula One, and it was considered as another "evolutionary step" up from its predecessor the TF103, which in turn had been labelled a "evolutionary step" up from the TF102 used in 2002. Luca Marmorini continued to lead the engine design.

The car was initially driven by the same pairing as in 2003; Olivier Panis and Cristiano da Matta. However, by the time the season came to a conclusion, both drivers had been replaced by Italy's Jarno Trulli and the team's Brazilian ex-test driver Ricardo Zonta respectively.

== Development ==
Development on the car had begun in earnest, some ten months prior to its unveiling. Upon launch, designer Gustav Brunner said; "The TF103 was a highly competitive package. Unfortunately, we couldn't get all of the performance out of it. Theoretically, the TF104 is an evolutionary step up from the TF103, but in fact, the TF104 shares not a single part that we used with the TF103. We improved every single inch of the chassis, and redesigned every important internal component. We achieved a great leap ahead aerodynamically, made the car lighter overall, and increased the rigidity of the chassis".

This continued approach was deemed to be too unambitious by many critics and this was confirmed by the overall performance of the car. Ultimately, this led to Brunner's dismissal midway through the season and it was the former Jordan and Renault Technical Director Mike Gascoyne who came in to replace him.

Known for his ability to assess weaknesses, and re-invigorate a team, Gascoyne started work immediately on revising the TF104.

=== TF104B ===
The resulting TF104B chassis couldn't be considered revolutionary either, but neither was it supposed to be with Gascoyne merely working to try to eradicate some of the initial conceptual flaws in the Brunner design. The revised car was introduced at the German Grand Prix to some positive effect, but rather than continue on that upward trend, Gascoyne ordered the freezing of any further development to concentrate on the upcoming TF105 chassis to be used in the 2005 Formula One season.

=== Espionage allegation controversy ===
During the season, the car's similarity to the previous year's championship car, the Ferrari F2003-GA, was so noted that there were accusations of the team of using stolen data files from Scuderia Ferrari. The case was investigated by the district attorney of Cologne, where Toyota F1 is based. Following the allegations, Toyota was reported to have refused to send the data back to Italy because they did not want Ferrari to take advantage of their own data, which had been mixed in with Ferrari's.

== Performance ==
Overall the car and the season were considered to be a disaster, with the team, now in its third season of competition, managing only a second consecutive eighth place Constructors' Championship finish. The ramifications of the car's poor performance were some key departures; technical director Gustav Brunner was fired mid-season and Cristiano da Matta soon followed having been blamed himself for lacklustre performances.

Da Matta during the British Grand Prix

With the arrival of Mike Gascoyne as technical director, alongside the announcements of Jarno Trulli and Ralf Schumacher for 2005, it could be argued that the Toyota F1 operation took on a slightly different feel over the course of the 2004 season.

== Complete Formula One results ==
(key) (results in bold indicate pole position)

Year	Entrant	Chassis	Engine	Tyres	Drivers	1	2	3	4	5	6	7	8	9	10	11	12	13	14	15	16	17	18	Points	WCC
2004	Toyota	TF104	Toyota RVX-04 V10	M		AUS	MAL	BHR	SMR	ESP	MON	EUR	CAN	USA	FRA	GBR	GER	HUN	BEL	ITA	CHN	JPN	BRA	9	8th
2004	Toyota	TF104	Toyota RVX-04 V10	M	(Brazil) Cristiano da Matta	12	9	10	Ret	13	6	Ret	DSQ	Ret	14	13								9	8th
2004	Toyota	TF104	Toyota RVX-04 V10	M	(France) Olivier Panis	13	12	9	11	Ret	8	11	DSQ	5	15	Ret								9	8th
2004	Toyota	TF104B	Toyota RVX-04 V10	M	(Brazil) Cristiano da Matta												Ret							9	8th
2004	Toyota	TF104B	Toyota RVX-04 V10	M	(France) Olivier Panis												14	11	8	Ret	14	14		9	8th
2004	Toyota	TF104B	Toyota RVX-04 V10	M	(Brazil) Ricardo Zonta													Ret	10^{†}	11	Ret		13	9	8th
2004	Toyota	TF104B	Toyota RVX-04 V10	M	(Italy) Jarno Trulli																	11	12	9	8th

- † – Driver did not finish the Grand Prix, but was classified as they completed more than 90% of the race distance.
