= 2003 Brazilian Grand Prix =

Formula One motor race held in 2003

Coordinates: 23°42′13″S 46°41′59″W

Race 3 of 16 in the 2003 Formula One World Championship
← Previous race	Next race →

Race details
- Date: 6 April 2003
- Official name: Grande Prêmio do Brasil 2003
- Location: Autódromo José Carlos Pace, São Paulo, Brazil
- Course: Permanent Racing Facility
- Course length: 4.309 km (2.677 miles)
- Distance: 54 laps, 232.656 km (144.566 miles)
- Scheduled distance: 71 laps, 305.909 km (190.083 miles)
- Weather: Rainy: 20 °C (68 °F)

Pole position
Driver	(Brazil) Rubens Barrichello	Ferrari
- Time: 1:13.807

Fastest lap
Driver	(Brazil) Rubens Barrichello	Ferrari
- Time: 1:22.032 on lap 46

Podium
First	(Italy) Giancarlo Fisichella	Jordan-Ford
Second	(Finland) Kimi Räikkönen	McLaren-Mercedes
Third	(Spain) Fernando Alonso (Note: The podium ceremony featured Räikkönen in first place, Fisichella in second and no-one in third, as Alonso was receiving medical attention at the time. The Fédération Internationale de l'Automobile later reversed first and second place due to a timekeeping error.)	Renault

The 2003 Brazilian Grand Prix (formally the Grande Prêmio do Brasil 2003) was a Formula One motor race held on 6 April 2003 at Autódromo José Carlos Pace (Interlagos). It was the third round of the 2003 Formula One World Championship, the 32nd Brazilian Grand Prix and the 700th Formula One World Championship race.

The race was scheduled to run for 71 laps, but was stopped on lap 56 after two major crashes blocked the circuit. Due to confusion about the timing of the red flag, which was initially believed to have been thrown during lap 55, the win was initially awarded to Kimi Räikkönen of McLaren, with Giancarlo Fisichella of Jordan in second and Fernando Alonso of Renault in third. However, following a post-race appeal by the Jordan team, eventually heard in court, it was established that the red flag had been thrown during lap 56 and Fisichella was leading at the end of lap 54 when the race results were declared, and he was awarded the win with Räikkönen demoted to second. Alonso remained in third place; he had missed the podium ceremony at the time as he was receiving medical attention. It was attended by 120,000 spectators.

The race was Fisichella's first Grand Prix victory. It was also Jordan's fourth and final victory, and the team's 200th Grand Prix. This was the first victory for a Ford engine since the 1999 European Grand Prix, and the first victory for an Italian driver since Riccardo Patrese won the 1992 Japanese Grand Prix. Prior to the 2026 Bahrain Grand Prix, this Grand Prix marked the last victory for a Ford-powered car to date. This marked the last time the Brazilian Grand Prix was held during the opening rounds of a Formula One season.

Although he did not win the race, Räikkönen scored more points than Coulthard, increasing his lead to nine points. Alonso improved from fifth to third with a ten point deficit over Räikkönen, while Fisichella's victory gave him his first points of the season in order to make a huge step in the championship by moving from sixteenth to fourth. In the Constructors' Championship, McLaren maintained their lead, while extending it to 16 points over Renault, that claimed second following the failure of both Ferraris to finish. Fisichella's win gave Jordan their first points as well, elevating the Irish team to fifth in the standings, six behind Ferrari and Williams.

== Background ==
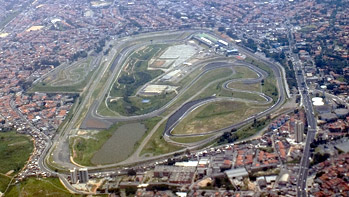
The Autódromo José Carlos Pace (pictured in 2006), where the race was held.

The 2003 Brazilian Grand Prix was the third of sixteen scheduled single seater motor races of the 2003 Formula One World Championship, the 32nd edition of the event and the 700th Formula One World Championship round. It took place at the 15-turn 4.309 km (2.677 mi) Autódromo José Carlos Pace in the Brazilian city of São Paulo on 6 April 2003. The bumpy track placed a large amount of strain and g-force onto a driver. To compensate for cars being driven over its bumpy surface, teams employed a computer programme fed into a chassis to reconstruct every movement under undulation. Under a Fédération Internationale de l'Automobile (FIA; Formula One's governing body) regulation mandating Formula One's two tyre suppliers Bridgestone and Michelin to bring a single wet-weather tyre compound to each race to lower operating costs: Michelin brought the full wets and Bridgestone the intermediates.

After winning the Malaysian Grand Prix two weeks earlier, McLaren driver Kimi Räikkönen led the World Drivers' Championship with 16 points, six ahead of his teammate David Coulthard in second. Juan Pablo Montoya of Williams, Ferrari driver Rubens Barrichello and Fernando Alonso for Renault tied for third with eight points each. In the World Constructors' Championship, McLaren led with 26 points; Ferrari and Renault were tied for second position with 16 points. Williams were a further two points behind in fourth and Sauber in fifth had four points. Following the 2002 edition, race organisers invested $1.7 million in resurfacing 1 km (0.62 mi) of track surface in an attempt to reduce its bumpiness, rebuilt its drainage system and introduced run-off areas in the first seven turns.

In preparation for the race, the majority of teams conducted in-season test sessions at the Circuit de Catalunya (now called the Circuit de Barcelona-Catalunya) in Spain from 25 to 28 March 2003 and worked to alter the aerodynamic performance of their cars. Sauber and Williams evaluated revised chassis components and both teams assessed their selection of tyre compounds from the Malaysian Grand Prix, optimising the setup of their vehicles to better suit it. A lap of 1:17.288 topped the time sheets for the Williams test driver Marc Gené on the first day. Pedro de la Rosa, the McLaren test driver, set the second day's fastest time, a 1:15.506. Williams's Ralf Schumacher set the quickest lap on the third day, lowering the overall best time to a 1:15.352. On the final day (held in heavy rain in the morning and sunshine for most of the afternoon) Ralf Schumacher remained fastest overall with a lap of 1:17.591. Toyota test driver Ricardo Zonta drove a Toyota TF102B for three days at the Circuit Paul Ricard evaluating its tyres.

The defending World Drivers' Champion Michael Schumacher of Ferrari was criticised by the German and Italian press for a sub-par beginning to the season. Schumacher said he expected criticism and thought Ferrari would have an advantage on circuits that suited his team better than others, "The first two races are not too good. Still, we got eight points out of these not very good races for us and our time will come again." Räikkönen, the Drivers Championship leader, said he would approach the race in the same method as he did in the preceding Malaysian Grand Prix, as Giancarlo Fisichella was eager to score for the Jordan team in its 200th Formula One race, "I trained and prepared hard for Sepang but unfortunately I did not get off the mark. So my target for the Brazilian Grand Prix is to take the chequered flag and bring points to the team and looking at the way the car ran strongly with Ralph in Malaysia, I know I can get both jobs done."

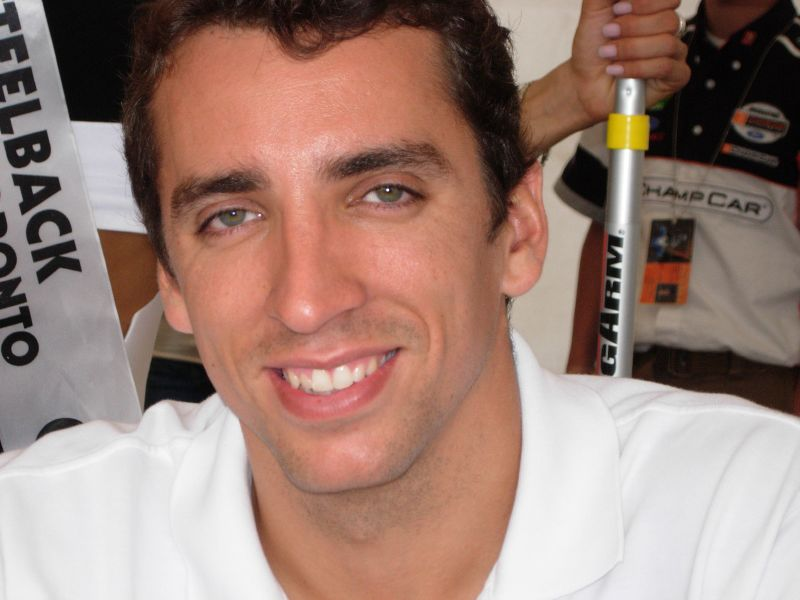
Justin Wilson (pictured in 2007) was deemed fit to compete in Brazil after his arms were temporarily paralysed by a loose HANS device at the preceding Malaysian Grand Prix.

Two weeks before the Grand Prix, the FIA announced drivers would no longer be granted dispensation to compete in Formula One races without wearing a HANS device. It stated any competitor who could not wear a HANS device for medical reasons would be barred from driving in future events. This stance was ratified at a meeting of the FIA World Motor Sport Council in Paris on 2 April. Minardi driver Justin Wilson was passed fit by the FIA medical delegate Sid Watkins to take part in the event. At the previous race, Wilson suffered from pain in his shoulders which was caused by a loose HANS device and seat belt, causing him to move about freely in his car's cockpit and pinching a nerve that paralysed both his arms. Wilson visited the team's headquarters in Faenza, Italy to test a twin seat belt system installed in his car to prevent a similar occurrence. Barrichello, who had a minor hernia and received dispensation from the stewards not to wear a HANS device for medical reasons, was at risk of being dropped for the race in the event a solution to his discomfort was not found. He tested a new HANS device during free practice and reported no discomfort, leaving the services of the Ferrari reserve driver Felipe Massa unneeded. (Note: Ferrari's nominated reserve driver Luca Badoer was injured in two high-speed accidents.)

A total of ten teams (each represented by a different constructor) entered two race drivers each for the race with no changes from the season entry list. Some teams made changes to their vehicles for the event. Williams installed a revised gearbox unit and rear suspension bracket designed specially for the FW25. The team also fitted a revised specification of front wing, modified a terminal section of the car's bodywork and rectified a rear wing issue. The Ferrari and Renault teams introduced new specifications of rear wing: Ferrari's wing changes featured semi-circular holes in the outer part of its main profile to limit vortex and was used solely by Barrichello. Renault adopted a rear wing characterised by a sinuous shape of its profiles, which was stood up sharply in the bulkheads section.

== Private test session ==
On Friday morning, a two-hour test session took place for teams who opted for limited testing during the season. In variable weather conditions that saw rain fell 90 minutes in, Renault driver Jarno Trulli set the session's fastest lap, a 1:14.262. Antônio Pizzonia was second in a Jaguar and his teammate Mark Webber third. Alonso, Fisichella, Allan McNish, the Renault test driver, Minardi's Jos Verstappen, Ralph Firman for Jordan and Wilson made up positions four to nine. During the session, Pizzonia drove the spare Jaguar after a mechanical fault stopped his race car at the Subida dos Boxes corner. With 36 minutes remaining, Firman abandoned his car in the pit lane with a drive shaft problem. Alonso subsequently spun on the Reta Oposta straight and was beached in a gravel trap at the Descida do Lago turn. His Renault was undamaged.

== Practice and warm-up sessions ==
There were three practice sessions preceding Sunday's race: one 60-minute session on Friday morning and two 45-minute sessions on Saturday morning. In the first practice session, held in torrential weather conditions and saw four drivers record no lap times, Michael Schumacher was quickest with a lap of 1:28.060, followed by Coulthard, British American Racing (BAR) driver Jenson Button, Trulli, Montoya, Barrichello, the Toyota pair of Olivier Panis and Cristiano da Matta, Fisichella and Heinz-Harald Frentzen of Sauber. Seconds after Räikkönen exited the pit lane, he lost control of his vehicle into the Reta Oposta straight and spun onto some grass. He narrowly avoided a collision with a barrier to his left. With 15 minutes to go, Pizzonia crashed heavily leaving the Curva do Sol turn and struck the barriers on both sides of the circuit on his first timed lap, temporarily stopping the session so that his Jaguar car could be removed from the track. After the session restarted, Alonso slid on the wet track and made minor contact against a wall at the Senna S chicane.

The circuit was sodden for the beginning of the second practice session and dried as it progressed to provide every driver with dry track acclimatisation. Barrichello set the pace with a 1:14.071 lap. Ralf Schumacher, Montoya, Michael Schumacher, Alonso, Räikkönen, Pizzonia, Webber, Coulthard and Heidfeld made up positions two to ten. In warm weather conditions, the final practice session was led by Panis who recorded a time of 1:13.457, ahead of Michael Schumacher, Trulli, Coulthard, Montoya, Räikkönen, Barrichello, Webber, Ralf Schumacher and Alonso. Several competitors spun during the session; none sustained damage to their cars. Räikkönen paced a 15-minute warm-up session that took place before the second qualifying session with a lap of 1:13.886. Barrichello, Michael Schumacher, Coulthard, Montoya, Webber, Button, Ralf Schumacher, Villeneuve and Heidfeld were second to tenth.

== Qualifying ==
The torrential rain observed in practice prompted several drivers to express concerns they would lose control of their vehicles and crash. Around 20 minutes before the first qualifying session, Coulthard, a senior member of the Grand Prix Drivers' Association, Trulli and Michael Schumacher wrote a petition mandating the FIA cancel the session if there was no improvement in the track conditions. The petition was signed by a majority of drivers; it was later disregarded after it was unable to be sent to everyone in time and race officials had deemed the circuit safe to drive on after the rain tapered off before qualifying commenced. BAR's Jacques Villeneuve said the petition was detrimental to Formula One, "What would it bring to Formula One for us not to go and qualify? People would think that we are just a bunch of sissies. We can't do that. We are paid a whole lot of money and it would be an insult to the fans."

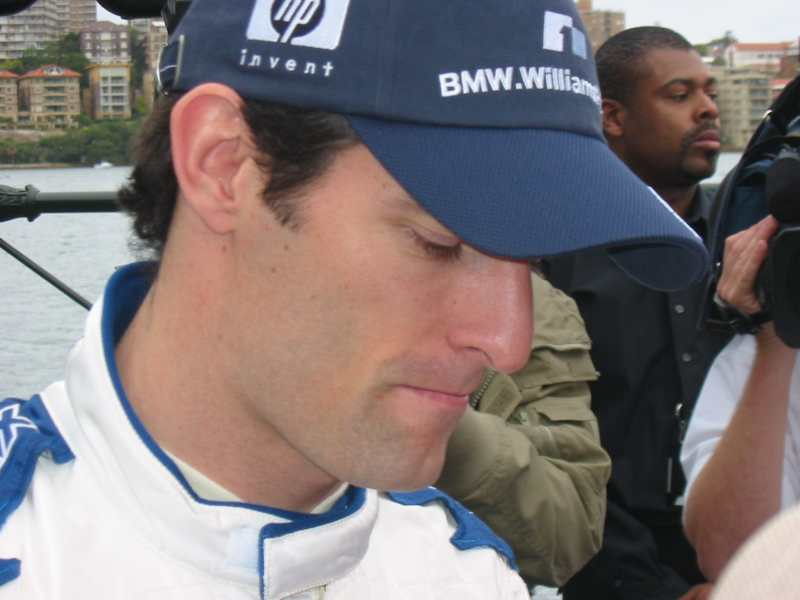
Mark Webber (pictured in 2005 while driving for Williams) took provisional pole position in the first qualifying session

There were two one-hour qualifying sessions, one on both Friday and Saturday afternoons. The World Drivers' Championship standings set the first session's running order (first to last) with the second run in reverse of the first session times (slowest to fastest). Each competitor recorded one timed lap in each session and the starting order was determined by the second session's quickest laps. The level of standing water fluctuated during the session. Webber took provisional pole position on a drying track with a 1:23.249 lap. He was 0.138 seconds faster than Barrichello in second, who had pole until Webber's lap. Räikkönen, the first driver to set a lap, was third and his teammate Coulthard, fourth, made a driver error at Bico de Pato corner. Michael Schumacher aquaplaned shortly after leaving the pit lane and took fifth. Panis's Toyota was not setup for the wet-weather conditions and took sixth. Villeneuve was seventh; Pizzonia, eighth, drove the spare Jaguar and aquaplaned on the start/finish straight.

Alonso, ninth, was circumspect, as Frentzen, tenth. reported an adequate car balance. An incorrect setup put Da Matta 11th. The wet-weather conditions restricted Trulli to 12th and an unbalanced car in slow speed corners left Ralf Schumacher in 13th. An oversteer and lack of grip restricted Fisichella to 14th as Verstappen extracted additional performance from his car to finish in 15th. Heidfeld was circumspect through the Arquibancdas turn en route to 16th. Montoya in 17th lost control of the rear of his Williams under braking and went onto a concrete run-off area at Ferradura corner. Firman in 18th drove with the rear of Jordan's spare car attached to his race vehicle. Wilson avoided a spin on the start/finish straight and was 19th. Button was the only driver not to set a lap time: he had a sudden oversteer when he ran onto a damp white line denoting the track boundaries, and aquaplaned at almost 145 mph (233 km/h). Button went through two polystyrene boards, removed his car's rear wing and abandoned the attempt. The session was temporarily stopped to clear on-track debris.

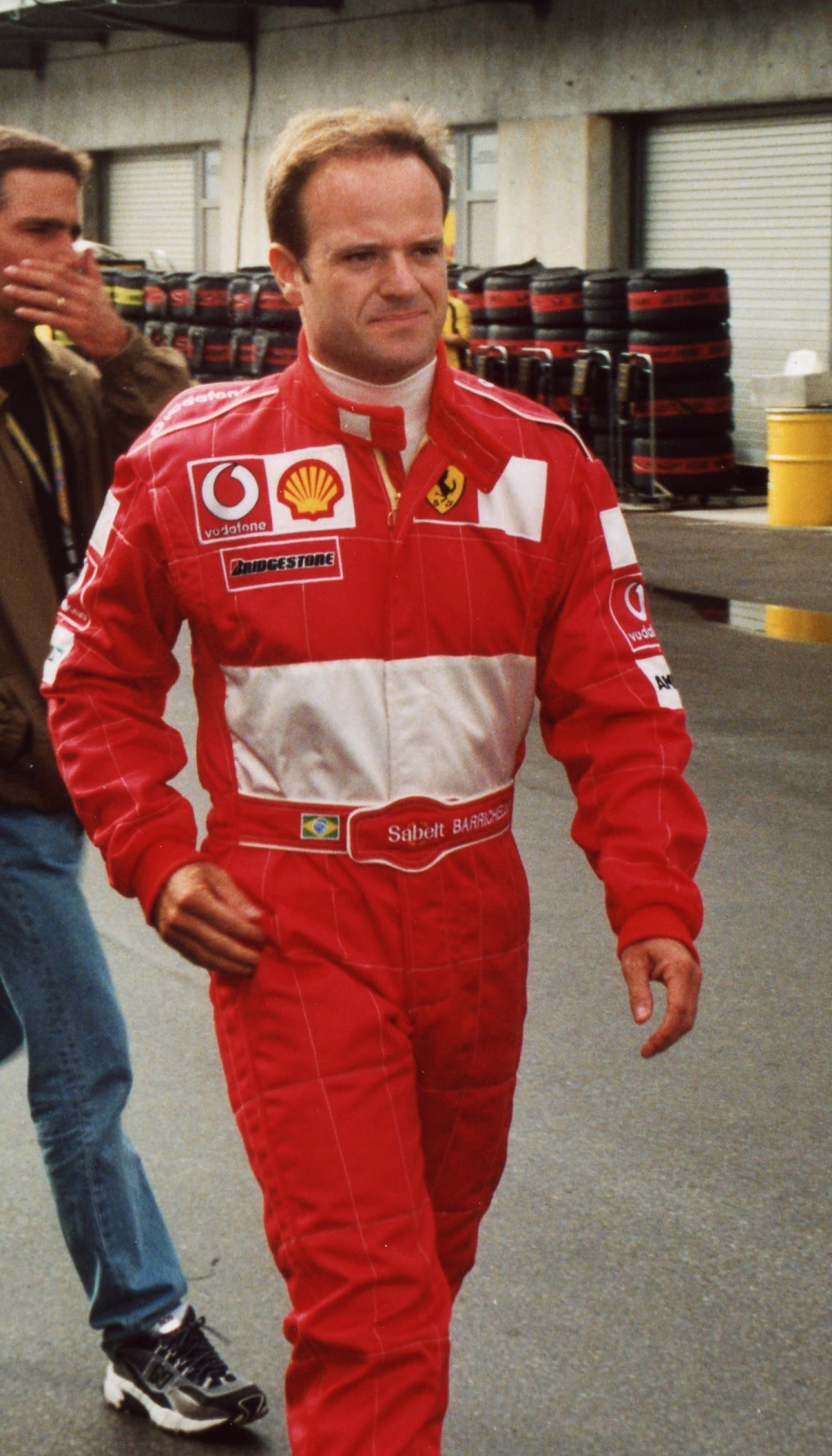
Rubens Barrichello (pictured in 2002) took the seventh pole position of his career in the second qualifying session

The second qualifying session was held in warm and dry weather conditions. Barrichello had the lap time display on his steering wheel switched off so he could be focused. This earned him pole position, the first for a Brazilian driver at the track since Ayrton Senna in the 1994 event, his first since the 2002 Hungarian Grand Prix and the seventh of his career with a 1:13.807 lap. Barrichello was joined on the grid's front row by Coulthard who was 0.11 seconds slower after McLaren changed his car's balance. Webber was set to take pole position until a driver error at Pinheirinho demoted him to third. A driver error at the same turn and a loose car left Räikkönen in fourth as Trulli moved to fifth. Excessive oversteer and circumspect braking restricted Ralf Schumacher to sixth. Michael Schumacher made a minor error at the Senna S chicane and was seventh, his lowest starting position since qualifying ninth for the 1998 German Grand Prix. Fisichella qualified eighth, Montoya had an oversteer that put him ninth and Alonso was tenth. Button set the 11th-fastest lap, with his teammate Villeneuve 13th after an intermittent loss of power in the Senna S chicane; Heidfeld in 12th separated the pair. Frentzen took 14th and Panis (who made a driver error) 15th. Firman changed his car's setup and qualified 16th due to a driver error, ahead of Pizzonia in 17th, who had brake problems and an unbalanced car. An tight handling car and an unsuccessful fix to the problems left Da Matta in 18th. The Minardi cars were equipped with a hard compound tyre and completed the starting order in 19th and 20th (Verstappen ahead of Wilson).

=== Qualifying classification ===
Pos	No.	Driver	Constructor	Q1 Time	Q2 Time	Gap	Grid
1	2	(Brazil) Rubens Barrichello	Ferrari	1:23.249	1:13.807	—	1
2	5	(United Kingdom) David Coulthard	McLaren-Mercedes	1:24.655	1:13.818	+0.011	2
3	14	(Australia) Mark Webber	Jaguar-Cosworth	1:23.111	1:13.851	+0.044	3
4	6	(Finland) Kimi Räikkönen	McLaren-Mercedes	1:24.607	1:13.866	+0.059	4
5	7	(Italy) Jarno Trulli	Renault	1:26.557	1:13.953	+0.146	5
6	4	(Germany) Ralf Schumacher	Williams-BMW	1:26.709	1:14.124	+0.317	6
7	1	(Germany) Michael Schumacher	Ferrari	1:25.585	1:14.130	+0.323	7
8	11	(Italy) Giancarlo Fisichella	Jordan-Ford	1:26.726	1:14.191	+0.384	8
9	3	(Colombia) Juan Pablo Montoya	Williams-BMW	1:27.961	1:14.223	+0.416	9
10	8	(Spain) Fernando Alonso	Renault	1:26.203	1:14.384	+0.577	10
11	17	(United Kingdom) Jenson Button	BAR-Honda	No time^{1}	1:14.504	+0.697	11
12	9	(Germany) Nick Heidfeld	Sauber-Petronas	1:27.111	1:14.631	+0.824	12
13	16	(Canada) Jacques Villeneuve	BAR-Honda	1:25.672	1:14.668	+0.861	13
14	10	(Germany) Heinz-Harald Frentzen	Sauber-Petronas	1:26.375	1:14.839^{2}	+1.032	14
15	20	(France) Olivier Panis	Toyota	1:25.614	1:14.839^{2}	+1.032	15
16	12	(Republic of Ireland) Ralph Firman	Jordan-Ford	1:28.083	1:15.240	+1.433	16
17	15	(Brazil) Antônio Pizzonia	Jaguar-Cosworth	1:25.764	1:15.317	+1.510	17
18	21	(Brazil) Cristiano da Matta	Toyota	1:26.554	1:15.641	+1.834	18
19	19	(Netherlands) Jos Verstappen	Minardi-Cosworth	1:26.886	1:16.542	+2.735	19
20	18	(United Kingdom) Justin Wilson	Minardi-Cosworth	1:28.317	1:16.586	+2.779	20

Notes

- ^1 – Jenson Button was left without a time in Q1 because he drove off the track and stopped the attempt.
- ^2 – Heinz-Harald Frentzen and Olivier Panis set identical lap times in Q2. Since Frentzen set the time ahead of Panis, he was ranked ahead of him.

== Race ==
On the morning of 6 April, McLaren sought permission from the FIA to change Räikkönen's engine after a crack in its casting was detected via telemetry. The FIA authorised the engine switch after it analysed data proving the engine was damaged. Telemetry from BAR also detected damage to Villeneuve's engine and were also allowed to change it. Rain was forecast for the race; at the start the track was flooded because of a torrential downpour that fell from at 11:00 Brasilia Time (UTC−02:00). 120,000 spectators attended the Grand Prix. It was due to commence at 14:00 local time, before the FIA race director Charlie Whiting delayed it for 15 minutes, to enable standing water to be drained from the circuit. Event organisers permitted teams to alter the setup of their cars to run on a sodden track, specially the wings and ride heights. The standing water caused heavy spray and impaired visibility, and all vehicles used wet-weather tyre compounds. The track's deficient drainage caused a large amount of water to cascade from a slope onto the tarmac surface at the inside of the bottom of Curva do Sol corner and made it susceptible for cars to aquaplane.

The race began behind the safety car, with no formation lap; notwithstanding the slow speed drivers struggled for grip on the flooded track surface. Some drivers (including Verstappen, Frentzen, Pizzonia, Panis, Fisichella and Firman) elected to make pit stops for fuel under safety car conditions in an attempt to avoid having to make a second pit stop later in the race. After the rain had stopped, the safety car drove into the pit lane at the end of lap eight, and cars were allowed to overtake. Barrichello bunched up the field on the approach to the start/finish line; the manoeuvre failed to work and Coulthard passed him for the lead under braking for the Senna S chicane. Barrichello was circumspect for the rest of the lap as Webber and Räikkönen pressured him. Further down the order, Montoya moved from ninth to fifth. Heidfeld became the Grand Prix's first retirement on lap nine when his engineers informed him over the radio of an oil feed problem that cut out his engine. He pulled off to the side of the track to ensure that no oil was deposited on the racing line.

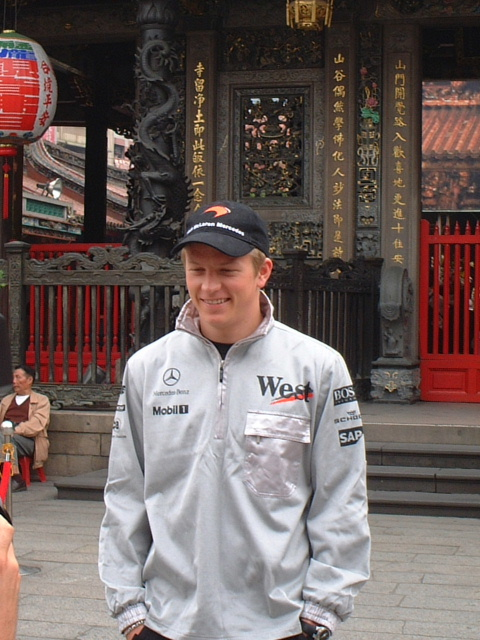
Kimi Räikkönen (pictured in 2002) was initially declared the winner of the race due to a timekeeping error.

On lap ten, Räikkönen overtook Barrichello for second at the Senna S chicane and lost third when Montoya passed him later that lap. There were overtakes further down the field on that lap. Ralf Schumacher moved past Trulli for sixth and Pizzonia passed Verstappen for fifteenth. On the 11th lap, Räikkönen closed up to his teammate Coulthard and passed him to take the lead on the approach to the Senna S chicane. Not long after Montoya overtook Coulthard for third at the end of the Reta Oposta straight that leads to the Descida do Lago corner. That same lap, Ralf Schumacher and Trulli made contact, causing the former to spin. Webber then overtook Barrichello for fourth and Michael Schumacher did the same on his teammate soon after for fifth. Ralf Schumacher began to recover lost positions with an overtake on Villeneuve for tenth on the 12th lap. At the front of the field, Räikkönen had increased his lead over Montoya to five seconds by lap 14. On the same lap, Montoya reported a loss of rear tyre grip to his team over the radio and ran wide leaving Junção turn. Coulthard overtook Montoya for second.

As the circuit began to dry, except for turn three which continued to have water stream across it, Coulthard began to close up to his teammate Räikkönen, as Michael Schumacher overtook Webber on the inside for fourth on lap 15 leaving Arquibancdas turn. On the 16th lap, Michael Schumacher moved into third position with a pass on the slower Montoya around the outside at the Bico de Pato corner. Wilson drove through a river at the Curva do Sol turn and aquaplaned off another on the following lap. He retired after he was unable to restart his car. Coulthard drew close enough to his teammate Räikkönen by the 18th lap, just as Barrichello moved past Webber for fifth place. That same lap, Firman's right-front suspension system failed going into the braking area on the start/finish straight, causing him to lose control of his car and his flailing right-front wheel narrowly avoided striking its cockpit. He narrowly avoided a collision with his teammate Fisichella, struck the rear of Panis's car at almost 190 mph (310 km/h). Panis's rear wing was removed and the front of Firman's car sustained damage.

The safety car was deployed for the second time for debris clearing. Several drivers took the opportunity to make pit stops for fuel and tyres. Montoya avoided a collision with Trulli and Alonso stopped twice since he had the incorrect tyres installed on his car. The safety car was withdrawn at the end of lap 22 and Räikkönen closed the field up to maintain the lead from Coulthard, Michael Schumacher and the yet-to-stop Da Matta. On the Reta Oposta straight, Barrichello overtook Da Matta for fourth on lap 23, as a driver error dropped Frentzen from eighth to sixteenth and Ralf Schumacher passed Verstappen for eleventh. Montoya overtook Da Matta for fifth and Ralf Schumacher moved past Button for ninth during lap 24. On the 25th lap, Montoya aquaplaned at the Curva do Sol and crashed into a right-hand side barrier. Pizzonia hit the water stream flowing across the circuit at the same corner and aquaplaned. He collided with the wall, ricocheted off it and struck Montoya's car. The accidents elevated Da Matta to fifth and Webber to sixth. By lap 26, Alonso had passed Villeneuve and Fisichella to move to tenth.

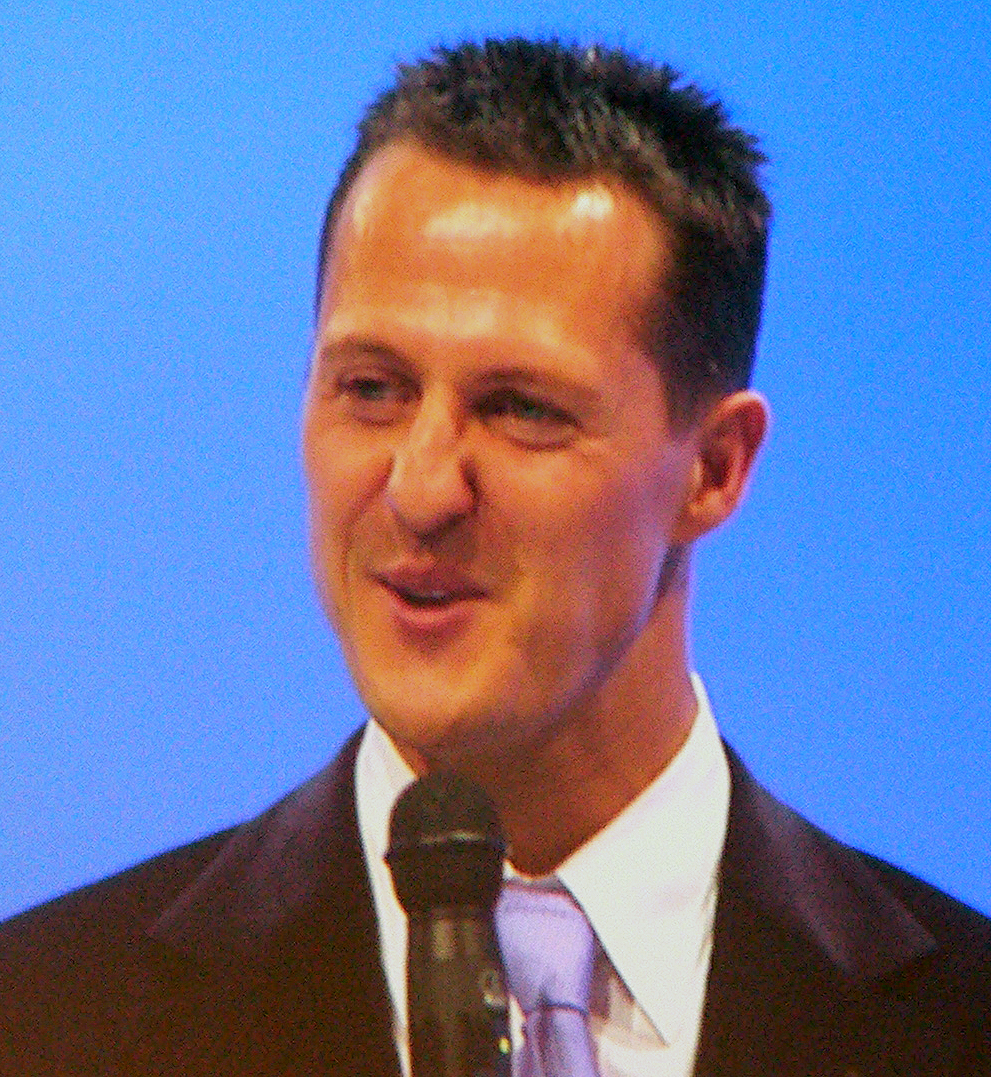
Michael Schumacher (pictured in 2007) was one of six drivers to be caught out by a stream of water at the Curva do Sol corner

Lap 27 saw the third safety car deployment: Michael Schumacher aquaplaned off the stream of water at the Curva do Sol turn and avoided hitting a recovery crane extricating Montoya and Pizzonia's vehicles from the side of the track. He stopped on a run-off area and failed to finish a race for the first time since the 2001 German Grand Prix. Räikkönen and Da Matta made their pit stops for fuel under safety car conditions. Coulthard took the lead and maintained it at the lap 30 restart. Räikkönen overtook Fisichella and Verstappen to return to seventh position and Da Matta passed Frentzen. On the 31st lap, Verstappen aquaplaned on the stream of water at the Curva do Sol corner and retired. The water caught out Button on lap 33: he lost control of his vehicle and crashed heavily against the barrier. Button was unhurt. The accident necessitated the safety car's fourth deployment. In the meantime, his teammate Villeneuve spun and fell behind Frentzen and Trulli. During the safety car period, Da Matta made a pit stop to correct a technical problem. At the lap 37 restart, Da Matta and Webber passed Villeneuve.

Räikkönen overtook Alonso on the start/finish straight into the Senna S chicane for fourth on the 38th lap. Further round the lap, he passed Ralf Schumacher on the outside line going into the Descida do Lago corner. Frentzen in eighth was overtaken by Webber and Villeneuve re-passed Da Matta for tenth during the same lap. On lap 40, Alonso steered to the inside to extract additional grip and passed Ralf Schumacher at Mergulho turn for fourth position. As Barrichello gained on race leader Coulthard, the stewards informed Renault on the 42nd lap that Alonso had been issued a drive-through penalty because he was deemed to have overtaken Ralf Schumacher under yellow flag conditions. He took the penalty on the same lap and fell from fourth to ninth. On the 44th lap, Webber lost control of the rear of his car at the Curva do Sol corner and spun through 360 degrees. He avoided contact with the barrier and merged onto the track after Frentzen, Alonso and Villeneuve passed him.

At the front of the field, Coulthard (on worn tyres) ran wide on the approach to the Senna S chicane and Barrichello used the driver error to pass him for first position on lap 45. Barrichello began to pull away from Coulthard, extending his lead to 4.2 seconds by lap 46's conclusion, who in turn, was 15 seconds ahead of his teammate Räikkönen. On lap 47, Barrichello pulled off at the side of the circuit to retire from the event for the ninth consecutive year, causing the first Ferrari's double withdrawal since the 1998 Belgian Grand Prix. A fuel feed problem was suspected to have caused Barrichello's retirement until it was traced to a malfunctioning in-car computer calculating it had 12 L (2.6 imp gal; 3.2 US gal) more fuel than normal and an error with Ferrari's telemetry did not inform the team he had run out of fuel. Coulthard returned to the lead, eighteen seconds ahead of his teammate Räikkönen in second and Fisichella third. By the 48th lap, drivers became concerned over fuel. Ralf Schumacher made a pit stop and rejoined in ninth. Alonso and Frentzen overtook Trulli and demoted him to sixth during laps 49 and 50.

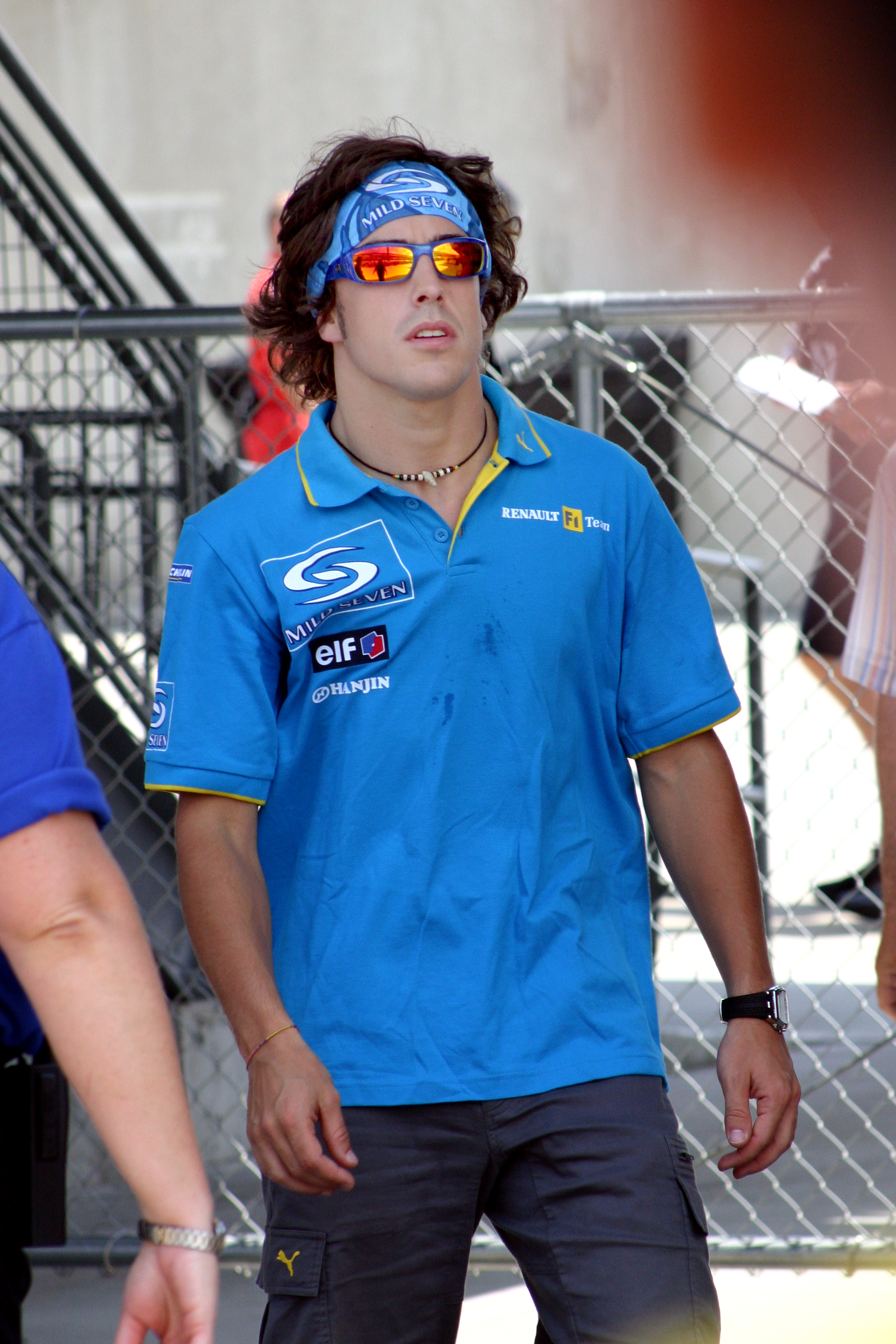
Fernando Alonso (pictured in 2004) sustained a major accident that contributed to a premature conclusion to the Grand Prix.

On the 52nd lap, Coulthard made a pit stop for tyres after a minor loss of car control through Junção corner and the start/finish straight. He rejoined the race in fourth position. Räikkönen retook the lead with the faster Fisichella second and Alonso third. On lap 54, a lack of tyre grip caused Räikkönen to understeer on the approach to the Mergulho turn and Fisichella passed him for the lead. Both drivers were borderline on fuel and it appeared Coulthard would return to the lead and win the event. At Arquibancadas corner, Webber attempted to prevent his worn intermediate tyres from overheating wherever possible and lost car grip on the crest to the pit lane straight on lap 54. He struck the concrete barriers on both sides of the circuit before the start/finish straight at 240 km/h (150 mph). Debris from Webber's car and three of its tyres were strewn across the track and causing the safety car's fifth deployment. Webber clambered from his car unhurt.

Fisichella and Räikkönen negotiated their way through the debris and the latter entered the pit lane to stop for fuel. Alonso did not notice the waved yellow flags informing him of a hazard, because he was discussing whether to use dry or wet tyres with Renault over the radio. He hit one of Webber's detached rear wheels at around 270 km/h (170 mph) in an impact measured at 4.5 g_{0} (44 m/s^{2}). Alonso veered left and struck a tyre wall at 35 g_{0} (340 m/s^{2}) lateral and longitudinal. The car was launched broadside across the circuit and into a concrete barrier at 60 g_{0} (590 m/s^{2}). Alonso sustained a bruised left elbow, knee and thigh, a group of medical personnel placed him on a stretcher for transport by ambulance to the Saint Louis Hospital in São Paulo for observation.

Because of a large amount of debris, personnel tending to Alonso, and 75% of the race distance covered, race continuation behind the safety car was impossible. The race ended early with a red flag after leader Fisichella finished lap 55, and all cars subsequently returned to the pit lane. Fisichella's car overheated because the safety car was slow and fire emerged from the engine bay at the rear of the car as he stopped in parc fermé, The sporting regulations stated that the race would be "deemed to have finished when the leading car crossed the line at the end of the lap two laps prior to that lap during which the signal to stop was given" in the event more than 75% of it was completed. The official timekeeping screens first showed that Fisichella had begun his 56th lap; then this status briefly disappeared and displayed it as on his 55th. The race stewards based their decision on the belief Fisichella was still on his 55th lap. Fisichella celebrated with the Jordan team in the belief he had won before they were informed Räikkönen had won; Räikkönen was informed while being weighed. Alonso was third, Coulthard fourth, the non-stopping Frentzen fifth, Villeneuve sixth, Webber seventh (notwithstanding his crash) and Trulli eighth. Ralf Schumacher and Da Matta (who had oversteer) were the final provisional finishers.

=== Post-race ===
Because Alonso was in hospital, Räikkönen and Fisichella appeared on the podium to collect their trophies and spoke to the media in a later press conference. Räikkönen believed he was lucky to be awarded the victory: "I think that it came so quickly that we didn't make the decision quickly enough but in the end it was the right decision, so thanks to the team. It was a difficult race because the conditions were so bad and the safety car was out so often, but I'm pretty happy." Fisichella said he was disappointed with the race's situation: "first of all for Fernando, I hope that he's alright and then also because I won the race but the rules say that when there is a red flag, the result is taken from one lap before (two laps in fact) so I am very sorry about that but I never thought I would finish in second position so it's a great day anyway."

Alonso received messages of well-being from the public and rally driver Carlos Sainz. He was discharged from hospital after 12 hours, and returned to Madrid on the morning of 8 April to begin physical therapy for the following San Marino Grand Prix. Alonso commented on the accident: "I thought my race was going pretty well. But then I came round the final corner to find debris everywhere and I had nowhere to go. I think I hit a wheel, and the next thing I knew I was headed for the barriers." He attributed the HANS device for preventing him from sustaining more serious injuries. Webber was not required to take a medical test and performed 60 push-ups to persuade his physiotherapist he had suffered no long-term complications from his crash. He called it "the biggest accident I've had in a Formula One car" and revealed his neck and knees took most of the force from the impact: "I haven't been in a race that crazy before and it's the most damage I've done to a Formula One car. I've knocked two corners off before but nothing like this."

After their crashes, Schumacher and Alonso were reported to the FIA by an observer within the governing body; the stewards could not question Alonso in Brazil as he was in hospital. Schumacher was interviewed by Whiting at the San Marino Grand Prix pre-event drivers' meeting on 17 April. Two days later, Alonso and Schumacher met with Whiting individually; he cautioned the two over their future driving standards and did not further reprimand them.

Villeneuve said he felt the drivers and not the track conditions contributed to unsafe racing: "It is down to the drivers to be less crazy in those conditions and there was some crazy driving out there. Some drivers were overtaking under the yellow flags, halfway through the race I saw Alonso overtake under the flags. I think that is the kind of driving that leads to big accidents." After his first race retirement since the 2001 German Grand Prix, Michael Schumacher stated he was unworried over the possibility of him winning his sixth World Drivers' Championship: "In terms of the championship, obviously it would have been better for us if Fisichella had won the race in Brazil instead of Raikkonen, especially as Giancarlo drove a good race anyway. But the gap to the championship leader is not so big, given there are still 13 races, so there is no need to be concerned about it." Barrichello said he would continue to strive to win the Brazilian Grand Prix and was frustrated to learn a fuel problem caused his retirement: "I feel an enormous disappointment but I am not losing hope. I will not stop racing until I win in this country."

Coulthard said he was annoyed with himself for making a pit stop before the red flags were shown because he believed he could have won the race had he not done so: "I am going away from here without a Grand Prix win that I worked hard for. I believe I have more claim on that victory than other people. I'd done my final stop of the race and I know the three guys in front of me all had to come in again if the race had not been stopped." Frentzen lauded Sauber's decision to change its strategy that saw him start the event in the team's spare car: "At the end of the day it turned out to be the right decision. It was not easy to run with a full tank and I had a lot of aquaplaning which made me spin once. But we finished fifth and scored four points, so I am very happy about this result." Paul Stoddart, the Minardi team owner, claimed they could have taken victory had both its cars been running: "Today saw possibly the first time ever that Minardi was potentially in a genuine, race-winning position. Many people may laugh, but only those of us within the team will ever know the truth. We had the strategy, but not the luck."

=== Timekeeping error ===
The Jordan team and Whiting discussed the discrepancy with the official timekeeping by timekeepers TAG Heuer and the Fédération Internationale de l'Automobile (FIA) concluded that this was sufficient to warrant an investigation. Whiting flew to London from Brazil on the morning of 8 April and launched the internal investigation into the result of the race. He was concerned about a possible timekeeping error and asked representatives from TAG Heuer and the three race stewards for the Brazilian Grand Prix, to attend a meeting at the FIA headquarters in Paris on the morning of 11 April as part of compliance with Article 179 (b) of the International Sporting Code.

Oral arguments as well as timing and video evidence gathered by Jordan were presented to a FIA court in Paris, which, on 11 April, awarded victory to Fisichella. McLaren declined to file an appeal. This was Fisichella's first Formula One win and the Jordan team's last. An unofficial ceremony was arranged for during the next race weekend at Imola, where Räikkönen and Ron Dennis handed over the winning driver's and constructor's trophies to Fisichella and Eddie Jordan.

=== Race classification ===
Pos	No.	Driver	Constructor	Tyre	Laps	Time/Retired	Grid	Points
1	11	(Italy) Giancarlo Fisichella	Jordan-Ford	B	54	1:31:17.748	8	10
2	6	(Finland) Kimi Räikkönen	McLaren-Mercedes	M	54	+0.945	4	8
3	8	(Spain) Fernando Alonso	Renault	M	54	+6.348	10	6
4	5	(United Kingdom) David Coulthard	McLaren-Mercedes	M	54	+8.096	2	5
5	10	(Germany) Heinz-Harald Frentzen	Sauber-Petronas	B	54	+8.642	PL^{3}	4
6	16	(Canada) Jacques Villeneuve	BAR-Honda	B	54	+16.054	13	3
7	4	(Germany) Ralf Schumacher	Williams-BMW	M	54	+38.526	6	2
8	7	(Italy) Jarno Trulli	Renault	M	54	+45.927	5	1
9	14	(Australia) Mark Webber	Jaguar-Cosworth	M	53	Accident	3	
10	21	(Brazil) Cristiano da Matta	Toyota	M	53	+1 lap	18	
Ret	2	(Brazil) Rubens Barrichello	Ferrari	B	46	Out of fuel	1	
Ret	17	(United Kingdom) Jenson Button	BAR-Honda	B	32	Accident	11	
Ret	19	(Netherlands) Jos Verstappen	Minardi-Cosworth	B	30	Spin	PL^{3}	
Ret	1	(Germany) Michael Schumacher	Ferrari	B	26	Accident	7	
Ret	3	(Colombia) Juan Pablo Montoya	Williams-BMW	M	24	Accident	9	
Ret	15	(Brazil) Antônio Pizzonia	Jaguar-Cosworth	M	24	Accident	PL^{3}	
Ret	20	(France) Olivier Panis	Toyota	M	17	Collision	15	
Ret	12	(Republic of Ireland) Ralph Firman	Jordan-Ford	B	17	Suspension/collision	PL^{3}	
Ret	18	(United Kingdom) Justin Wilson	Minardi-Cosworth	B	15	Spin	20	
Ret	9	(Germany) Nick Heidfeld	Sauber-Petronas	B	8	Engine	12	

Notes

- ^3 — Heinz-Harald Frentzen, Ralph Firman, Antônio Pizzonia and Jos Verstappen started from the pit lane.

== Championship standings after the race ==
Drivers' Championship standings

+/–	Pos	Driver	Points
	1	(Finland) Kimi Räikkönen	24
	2	(United Kingdom) David Coulthard	15
2	3	(Spain) Fernando Alonso	14
12	4	(Italy) Giancarlo Fisichella	10
2	5	(Italy) Jarno Trulli	9

Constructors' Championship standings

+/–	Pos	Constructor	Points
	1	(United Kingdom) McLaren-Mercedes	39
1	2	(France) Renault	23
1	3	(Italy) Ferrari	16
	4	(United Kingdom) Williams-BMW	16
2	5	(Republic of Ireland) Jordan-Ford	10

- Note: Only the top five positions are included for both sets of standings.

== Notes ==
Previous race: 2003 Malaysian Grand Prix	FIA Formula One World Championship; 2003 season	Next race: 2003 San Marino Grand Prix
Previous race: 2002 Brazilian Grand Prix	Brazilian Grand Prix	Next race: 2004 Brazilian Grand Prix
