= Toyota TF101 =

Unraced Formula One racing car

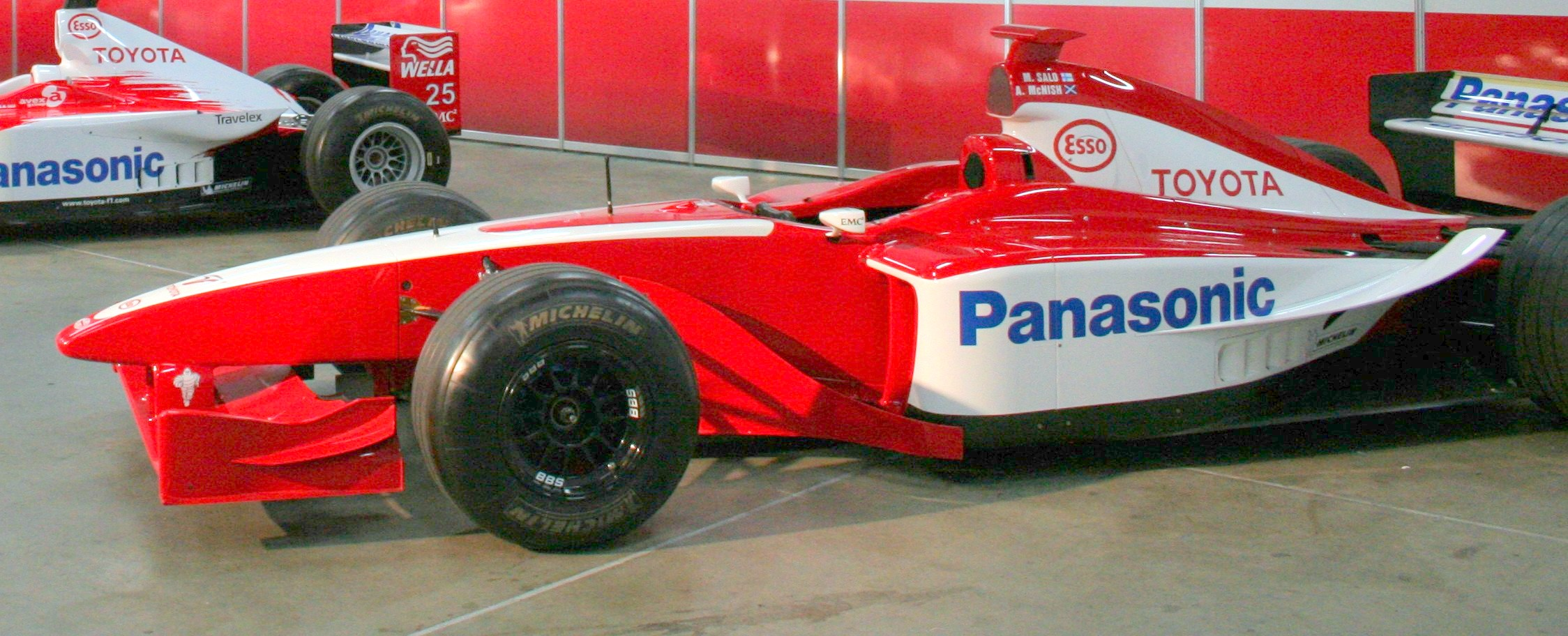
- The 2001 Toyota TF101 (AM01)
- Category: Formula One
- Constructor: Toyota
- Designers: André de Cortanze (Technical Director); Jean-Claude Martens (Chief Designer)
- Successor: TF102

Technical specifications
- Chassis: carbon-fibre and honeycomb composite monocoque
- Suspension (front): Push rod with Torsion bar
- Suspension (rear): Push rod with Torsion bar
- Engine: Toyota RVX01
- Transmission: Six Gear, Semi-Automatic
- Fuel: Esso
- Tyres: Michelin

Competition history
- Notable entrants: Panasonic Toyota Racing
- Notable drivers: (Finland) Mika Salo (United Kingdom) Allan McNish
- Debut: N/A
Races	Wins	Poles	F/Laps
0	0	0	0
- Constructors' Championships: 0
- Drivers' Championships: 0

The Toyota TF101 (originally known as the Toyota AM01) was a Formula One car used solely for testing purposes during the 2001 season, in preparation for the team's full-scale assault on the series in 2002. The car was designed by Toyota F1's chief of chassis Jean-Claude Martens and was driven by Mika Salo and Allan McNish.

This was the first Formula One car to run on Esso fuel since the 1960s.

== Development ==
The car was designed and built from the ground up by the staff at Toyota Motorsports GmbH (TMG) in Cologne, Germany over a period of nineteen months, in preparation for Toyota's entry to Formula One in 2002. After the initial unveiling of the car, the test team, including drivers Mika Salo and Allan McNish took on an intensive testing programme, accumulating a total of 3,000 laps and 22,967 km at eleven F1 circuits around the world, and also the specialist testing facility at Paul Ricard in Southern France.

During the development of the car, the initial designer André de Cortanze was replaced by Austrian Gustav Brunner and he oversaw the continued development of the car, eventually molding the TF102 car, the team's debut racegoing machine based on the work done during the 2001 season.

The car was handling poorly and being overweight, Mika Salo described it as being "a piece of shit".
