= Toyota TF102 =

Formula One racing car

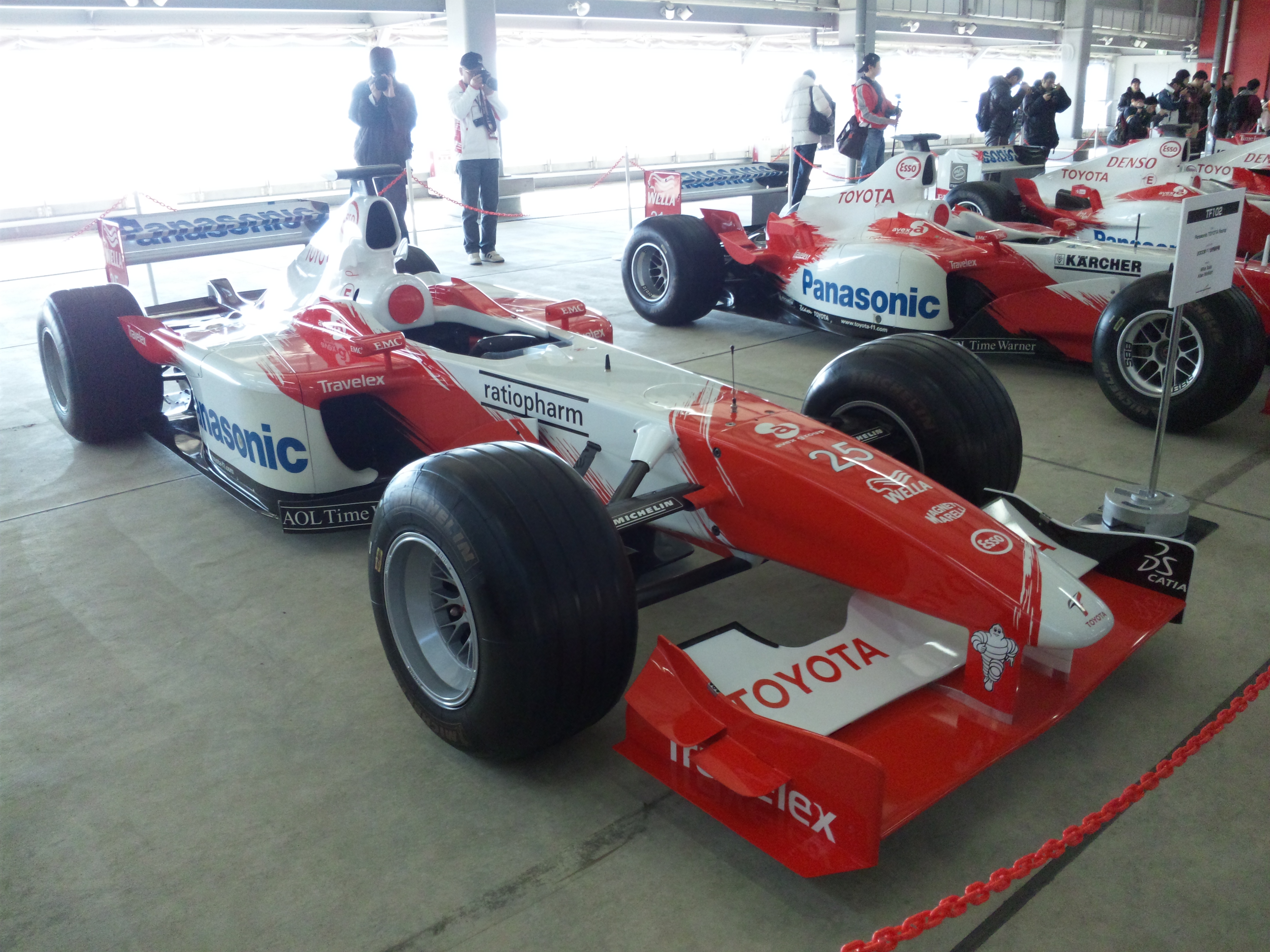
- Allan McNish's TF102 on display at the 2010 Toyota Motorsport Festival
- Category: Formula One
- Constructor: Toyota
- Designers: Dagobert Röhrer (Technical Director); Gustav Brunner (Chief Designer); Paul White (Deputy Chief Designer); Olivier Hulot (Head of Electronics); René Hilhorst (Head of Aerodynamics); Norbert Kreyer (Engine Director); Luca Marmorini (Chief Designer, Engine)
- Predecessor: TF101 (never raced)
- Successor: TF103

Technical specifications
- Chassis: Carbon-fibre and honeycomb composite monocoque
- Suspension (front): Push rod with torsion bar
- Suspension (rear): As front
- Length: 4,547 mm (179 in)
- Width: 1,800 mm (71 in)
- Height: 959 mm (38 in)
- Axle track: Front: 1,424 mm (56 in); Rear: 1,411 mm (56 in)
- Wheelbase: 3,120 mm (123 in)
- Engine: Toyota RVX-02 2,998 cc (183 cu in) 72-degree V10 naturally-aspirated mid-engined
- Transmission: Toyota-designed maincase with Toyota/Xtrac internals 6-speed + 1 reverse semi-automatic limited-slip differential
- Battery: Panasonic lead-acid 12 volts
- Power: 625 kilowatts (835 hp) at 18,200 rpm
- Weight: 600 kg (1,323 lb) including driver, fuel and other components
- Fuel: Esso
- Lubricants: Esso
- Tyres: Michelin

Competition history
- Notable entrants: Panasonic Toyota Racing
- Notable drivers: 24. (Finland) Mika Salo; 25. (United Kingdom) Allan McNish
- Debut: 2002 Australian Grand Prix
- Last event: 2002 Japanese Grand Prix
Races	Wins	Poles	F/Laps
17	0	0	0
- Constructors' Championships: 0
- Drivers' Championships: 0

The Toyota TF102 was the car with which the Toyota team competed in the 2002 Formula One season, the team's inaugural Championship campaign. The car reflected the results of a year's testing in 2001 with the TF101, and was designed primarily by Dagobert Röhrer, Gustav Brunner and René Hilhorst. The engine was designed by Luca Marmorini. As with the TF101, it was piloted during the season by Mika Salo and Allan McNish.

== Development ==
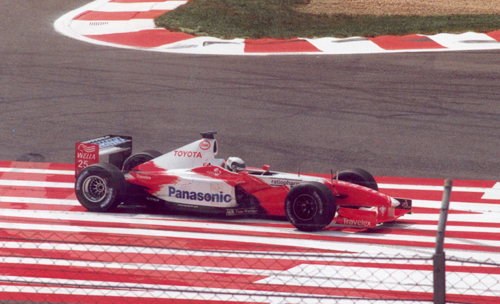
Driver Allan McNish in a TF102 at the 2002 French Grand Prix.

The car had a much more conventional look in the aerodynamic sense than the test car did, something that was commented on by Brunner at its launch in November 2001: "The car tested during 2001 showed the results we wanted. This new model reflects the latest technology, and has a much more conventional setup than the test car."

The car sported a different paint livery than the one seen on the test car, with a more abstract red and white design taking over from the contoured lines of the previous model.

== Performance ==
At the opening race of the 2002 season in Melbourne, Salo came home sixth to give the team a point on its Formula One début. The Finn added a second point two races later, in Brazil.

McNish, meanwhile, was on course for a point of his own in Malaysia, but a pit-lane mistake by the team meant he finished seventh. During qualifying for the final race of the season, at Suzuka, he wrote off a chassis completely when he crashed at the super-quick 130R corner, also tearing a hole in the Armco barrier. However, he sustained no serious injury, which paid testament to the safety of the TF102.

The two points put Toyota tenth in the Constructors' Championship, behind Minardi on count-back (Mark Webber had finished fifth in Australia) but ahead of the financially troubled Arrows.

Team principal Ove Andersson had warned at the beginning of the season that it would be very much a "learning year" and overall the car's performance was received with optimism due to its sturdy reliability.

== Complete Formula One results ==
(key) (results in bold indicate pole position)

Year	Chassis/Engine Tyres	Drivers	1	2	3	4	5	6	7	8	9	10	11	12	13	14	15	16	17	Points	WCC
2002	TF102; Toyota V10; **M**		AUS	MAL	BRA	SMR	ESP	AUT	MON	CAN	EUR	GBR	FRA	GER	HUN	BEL	ITA	USA	JPN	2	10th
2002	TF102; Toyota V10; **M**	(Finland) Mika Salo	6	12	6	Ret	9	8	Ret	Ret	Ret	Ret	Ret	9	15	7	11	14	8	2	10th
2002	TF102; Toyota V10; **M**	(United Kingdom) Allan McNish	Ret	7	Ret	Ret	8	9	Ret	Ret	14	Ret	11^{†}	Ret	14	9	Ret	15	DNS	2	10th
