= Renault Formula One crash controversy =

Controversy at the 2008 Singapore Grand Prix

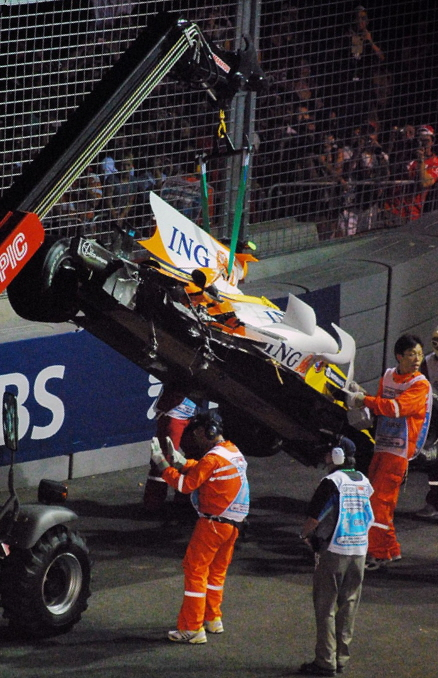
The wrecked Renault R28 car driven by Nelson Piquet Jr. at the centre of the controversy

The Renault Formula One crash controversy, dubbed "Crashgate" by some in the media, was a sporting scandal caused when Renault F1 driver Nelson Piquet Jr. deliberately crashed during the 2008 Singapore Grand Prix to give a sporting advantage to his Renault teammate, Fernando Alonso.

On 28 September 2008, on the 15th lap of the Singapore race, which was close to the expected pit window for everyone's first stop, the Renault R28 driven by Piquet Jr. crashed into the circuit wall at turn 17, necessitating a safety car deployment. Alonso had previously made an early pitstop, and was promoted to the race lead as other cars were running out of fuel and were forced to pit under safety car conditions, resulting in a penalty, or shortly after the safety car period, which pushed them several positions behind the now compact pack. Alonso subsequently won the race after starting 15th on the grid. At the time, Piquet Jr. described his crash as a "simple mistake", excusing himself with how hard the car was to drive with heavy fuel.

After being dropped by the Renault team following the 2009 Hungarian Grand Prix, Piquet Jr. alleged that he had been asked by the team to deliberately crash to improve the race situation for Alonso, sparking an investigation of Renault F1 for race fixing by the Fédération Internationale de l'Automobile (FIA), Formula One's governing body. After an investigation, Renault F1 were charged with conspiracy on 4 September, and were to answer the charge on 21 September 2009.

On 16 September, Renault stated that they would not contest the charges, and announced that the team's managing director, Flavio Briatore, and its executive director of engineering, Pat Symonds, had left the team.

On 21 September, it was announced that the Renault F1 team had been handed a disqualification from Formula One. The disqualification was suspended for two years pending any further comparable rule infringements. Briatore was banned from all Formula One events and FIA-sanctioned events indefinitely, whilst Symonds received a five-year ban. Their bans were subsequently overturned by a French court, although they both agreed not to work in Formula One or FIA-sanctioned events for a specified time as part of a later settlement reached with the governing body. Briatore would ultimately return to F1 in 2022 as an ambassador, and to Team Enstone in 2024 as an advisor, and in 2025 as team principal, while Symonds would return to the sport in 2011 as a technical consultant for Virgin Racing.

== Background ==
=== Renault F1 ===
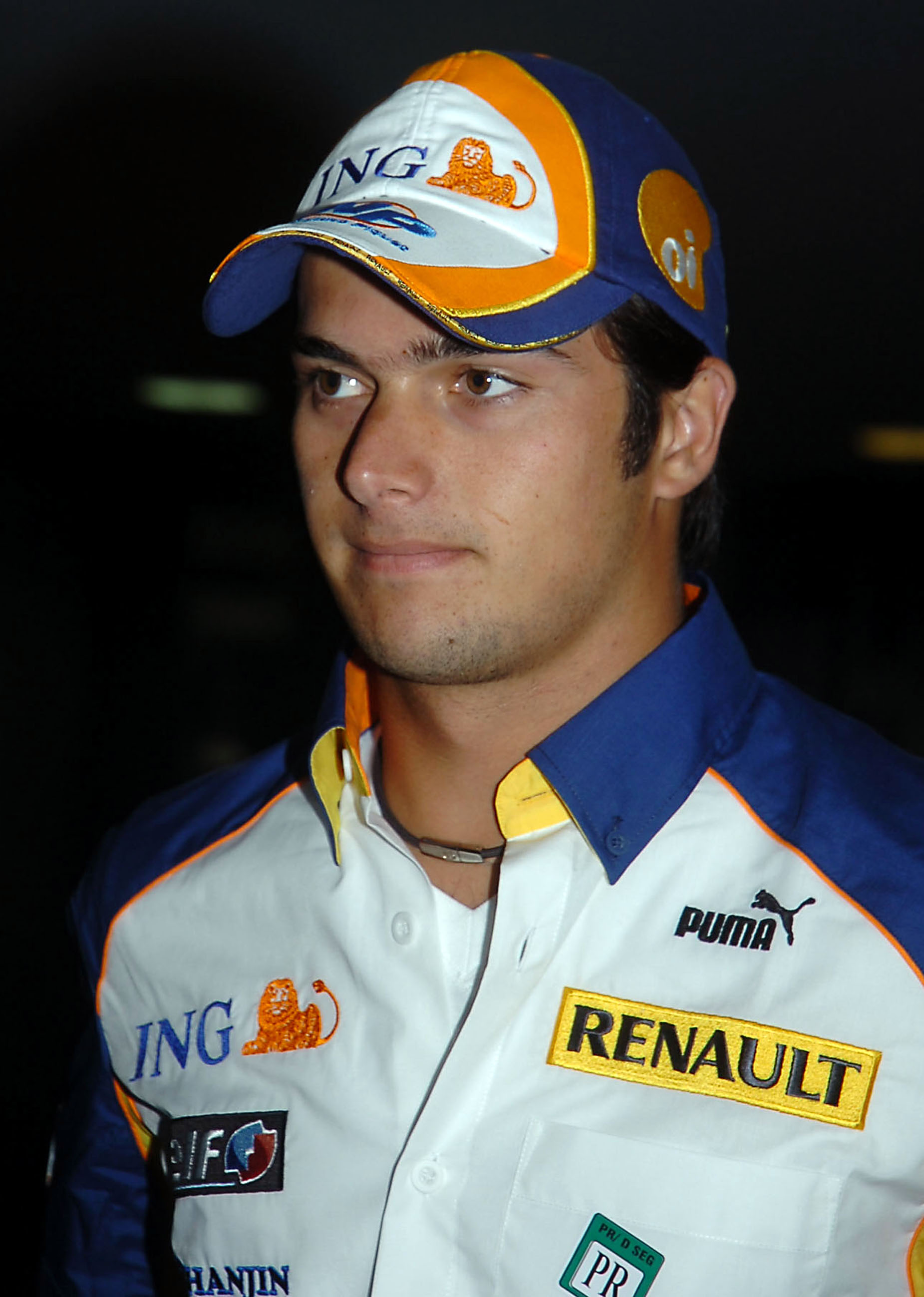
Nelson Piquet Jr., December 2007

The Renault F1 Formula One team came into existence with the car manufacturer Renault's re-entrance into Formula One in 2000, by purchasing the Benetton Formula One team. Italian businessman Flavio Briatore had been managing director of Benetton until 1997, when he was replaced by Prodrive boss David Richards. After managing Renault's motorsport sister company Mecachrome, Briatore returned to the main team following the Renault takeover, again as managing director. In addition to his Formula One sporting interests, as of August 2007, Briatore was chairman and part owner of the English football club Queens Park Rangers F.C. (QPR), which he purchased jointly with Formula One president Bernie Ecclestone, being joined later by funds from Indian industrialist Lakshmi Mittal.

Spanish racing driver Fernando Alonso had been involved in Formula One since 2001, and drove for the team from 2002 to 2006. After becoming World Champion in 2005 and 2006 and a one-year stint with McLaren in 2007, he returned to the team in 2008. English engineer Pat Symonds had risen to his position as executive director of engineering with Renault F1 having worked for the Benetton team, and having entered Formula One with Benetton's predecessor Toleman Motosport in the early 1980s. Brazilian racing car driver Nelson Piquet Jr. – son of Formula One triple-world champion Nelson Piquet – joined the Renault F1 team as the second driver alongside Alonso for the 2008 season, having been their reserve and test driver during 2007. Since October 2006, Piquet Jr. was also personally contracted to Flavio Briatore's management company FFBB. Before the Singapore incident, Renault F1 had not won a race for almost two years (the last Grand Prix won was on 8 October 2006, the Japanese Grand Prix), and were said to be close to quitting the sport.

=== 2008 Singapore Grand Prix ===
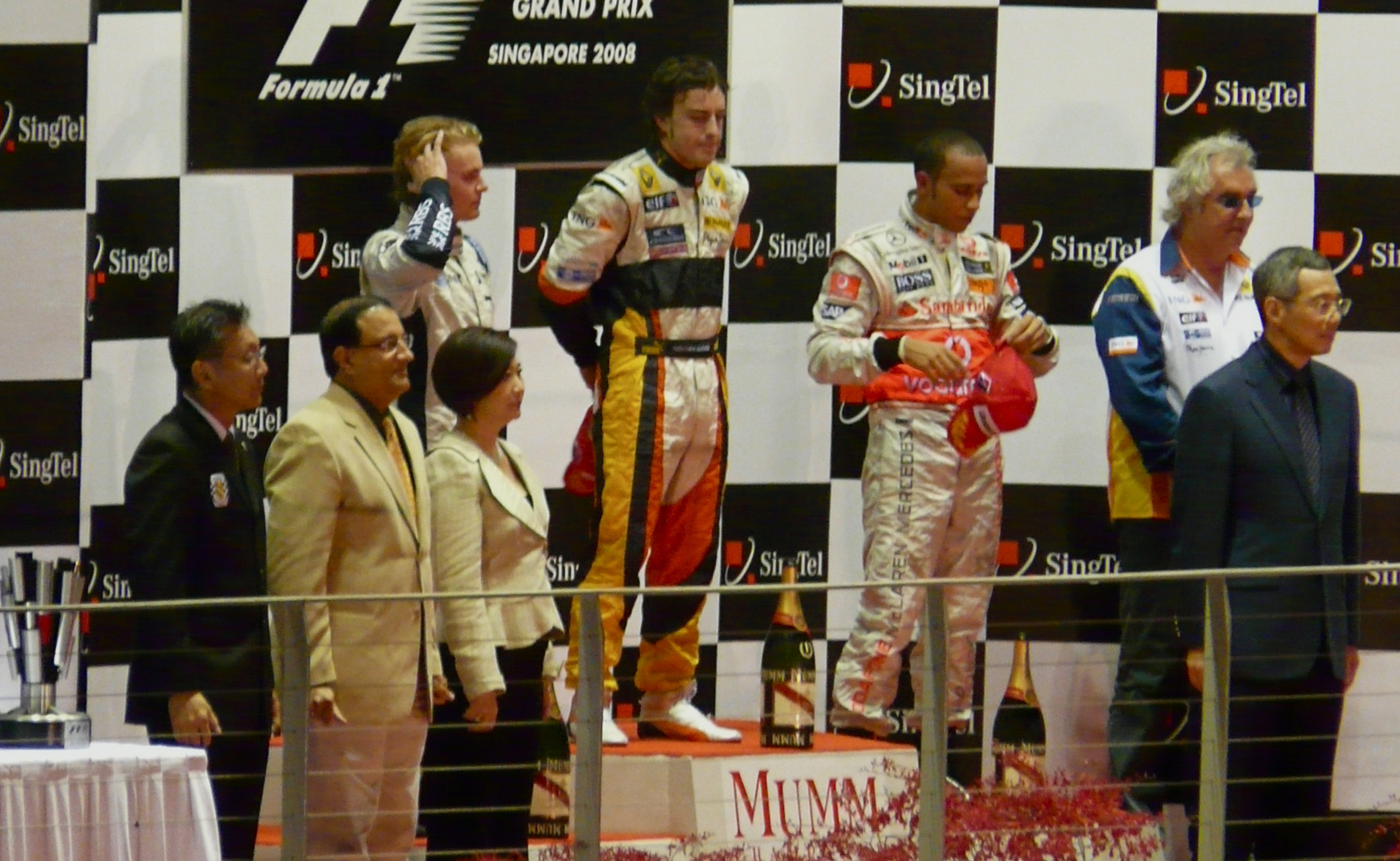
Alonso on the podium of the 2008 Singapore Grand Prix, with Briatore far right (white shirt)

The 2008 Singapore Grand Prix was the fifteenth race of the 2008 Formula One season, and took place on 28 September 2008. The race was Formula One's first night race. On the race weekend, despite Alonso being close to the top in practice, Renault had a poor qualifying session and started well down the grid, with Fernando Alonso starting in 15th place, and Nelson Piquet Jr. alongside him in 16th. Alonso was eliminated during qualifying because of mechanical failure.

During the warm-up lap, Piquet Jr. spun at the exact corner where he would later crash out, but was in this instance able to continue. After the race started, Alonso was the first driver to make a routine pit stop for fuel and tyres on lap 12, rejoining the race at the back of the field. He had put in a light fuel load at the start of the race in an attempt to pass the cars in front of him; most drivers that qualify in low positions tend to do the opposite and go for heavier fuel loads to make one fewer pit stop (approximately 30 seconds each in terms of time loss) than the leaders, as they do not want to waste a light car and an extra pit stop for a faster car that is stuck behind slower vehicles. Three laps later, Piquet Jr. hit the circuit wall at turn seventeen, one of the turns on the circuit which did not have a crane nearby, necessitating the deployment of the safety car.

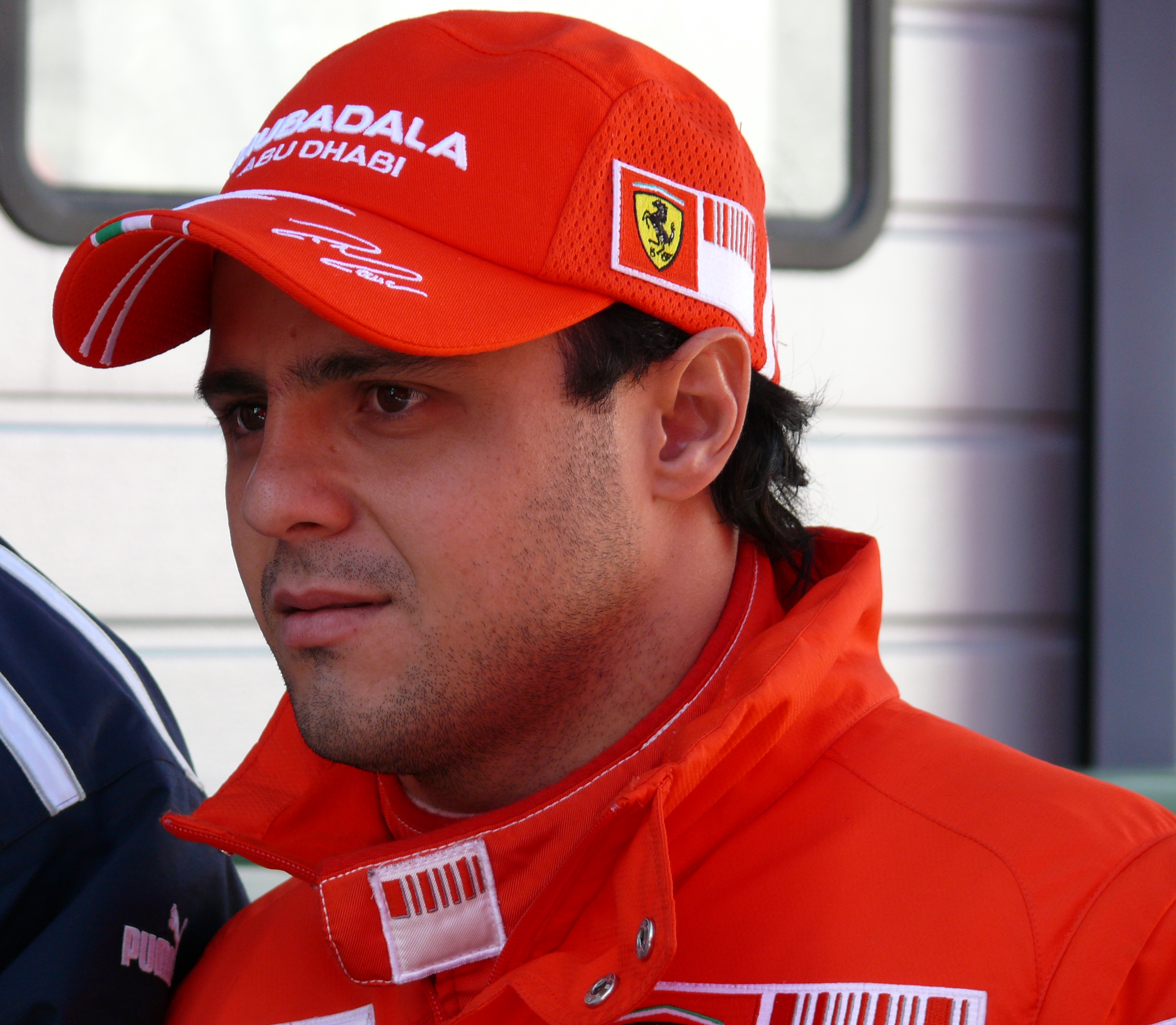
Brazilian Felipe Massa was leading the Grand Prix for Ferrari before Piquet Jr.'s crash

Safety car regulations in 2008 meant that the pit lane was closed until all cars had been bunched up behind the safety car. Hence the advantage of the lead cars would be eliminated before they were able to pit and after they did pit, they would re-enter the race at the back of the field. Alonso, having pitted just before the safety car was introduced, therefore gained a significant advantage. (Under previous regulations, the pit lane remained open during safety car incidents and the lead cars could quickly pit before their lead was eliminated and re-enter the race with less loss of track position.) In order to avoid running out of fuel, some drivers did need to pit while the pit lane was closed and they were penalised for the infraction.

Most of the leading cars ended up behind Alonso and also behind some slower drivers who proved difficult to pass on the narrow circuit; those ahead of Alonso were lighter on fuel and whilst they were able to pull away, they still needed to make a pit stop. After gaining the lead in the final third of the race, Alonso went on to win the race.

A first podium of the season and first victory as well and I am extremely happy. I cannot believe it right now, I think I need a couple of days to realise we won a race this year. It seems impossible all through the season to be close to the top guys and here suddenly we have been competitive from Friday. Obviously we started at the back and the first safety car helped me a lot and I was able to win the race.

— Fernando Alonso after the race, his first win of the year.

From the start of the race things were complicated and I had a lot of graining and the situation got worse and worse. The team asked me to push, which I tried to do and finally I lost the rear of my car. I hit the wall heavily but I'm OK. I am disappointed with my race but obviously very happy for the team this evening.

— Nelson Piquet Jr. after the race.

No action was initially taken over the crash. Piquet Jr. initially characterised the crash as "a simple mistake". In the post-race press release from Renault F1, the team described Alonso's performance as a "brilliant tactical drive", while both Briatore and Symonds attributed the safety car use as a case of good luck. Following the race, freelance Formula One journalist Joe Saward, writing on grandprix.com, stated that "some cynics" were questioning the incident, but dismissed it with the opinion that "one likes to believe that no team would ever be so desperate as to have a driver throw his car at a wall". According to the Brazilian television station Rede Globo, Brazilian driver Felipe Massa, who finished the Singapore race in 13th having been leading at the time of Piquet Jr.'s crash, and eventually lost the 2008 World Championship to Lewis Hamilton by one point, questioned Briatore about the crash at the time, although FIA president Max Mosley stated the sport could take no action based on "speculation".

=== Piquet Jr. leaves Renault ===
Fernando Alonso ended the 2008 season fifth in the Drivers Championship with 61 points, while Nelson Piquet Jr. finished in twelfth place, with 19 points. Their collective total earned Renault F1 fourth place in the Constructors Championship. Despite rumours that he was set to leave the team, Renault re-signed Piquet Jr. on a one-year contract for the 2009 season, once again alongside Alonso. By the tenth race of the 2009 season, Piquet Jr. had failed to score any points whereas Alonso had managed 13. On 3 August 2009, Piquet Jr. confirmed that he had been dropped by Renault. The departure was acrimonious, with Piquet Jr. criticising both the team and Briatore. He was replaced by test driver Romain Grosjean for the remainder of the season.

== Piquet Jr.'s accusations ==
=== Initial reports and investigation ===
On 30 August 2009, during coverage of that year's Belgian Grand Prix, the Brazilian television station Rede Globo reported that Piquet Jr. had been ordered to crash during the Singapore race. Formula One's governing body, the Fédération Internationale de l'Automobile (FIA), immediately announced it was investigating "alleged incidents at a previous F1 event". It was widely reported that the race in question was the 2008 Singapore Grand Prix.

=== Renault charged ===
On 4 September, following the investigation by the FIA, Renault F1 were formally accused of interfering with the outcome of the 2008 Singapore Grand Prix, and conspiring with Piquet Jr. In a statement, the FIA stated that the charges against Renault F1 included "a breach of Article 151c of the International Sporting Code, that the team conspired with its driver, Nelson Piquet Jr, to cause a deliberate crash at the 2008 Singapore Grand Prix with the aim of causing the deployment of the safety car to the advantage of its other driver, Fernando Alonso." The team was called to a meeting of the FIA World Motor Sport Council (WMSC) in Paris on 21 September, days before the 2009 running of the Singapore Grand Prix. After being charged, the Renault F1 team stated that they would be making no comments until the hearing.

=== Leaked evidence ===
On 10 September, Piquet Jr. made the second of two statements to the FIA. On the same day, a transcript of Piquet's first statement to the FIA made at their headquarters in Paris on 30 July was published by F1SA.com (F1 Supporters Association).

In response to questions over its authenticity, FIA president Max Mosley stated "I haven't seen anything which I believe to be a forgery." In the transcript, Piquet Jr. states that he was asked by Briatore and Symonds to crash his car at a specific corner. Alonso denied knowing of any plan to ask Piquet Jr. to crash, stating "I cannot imagine these things, these situations. It's something that never entered my mind." Piquet Jr. questioned whether Alonso knew that a crash was planned, citing that in his place, he would have questioned Renault's "senseless" Alonso race strategy of starting with a low fuel load and making an early pit stop on the twelfth lap. During the course of the investigation and before the WMSC hearing, Alonso was absolved of any blame by the FIA.

On 11 September, Mosley confirmed that Piquet Jr. would face no action after making his two statements, even if the case was found in favour of Renault.

=== Renault start legal action ===
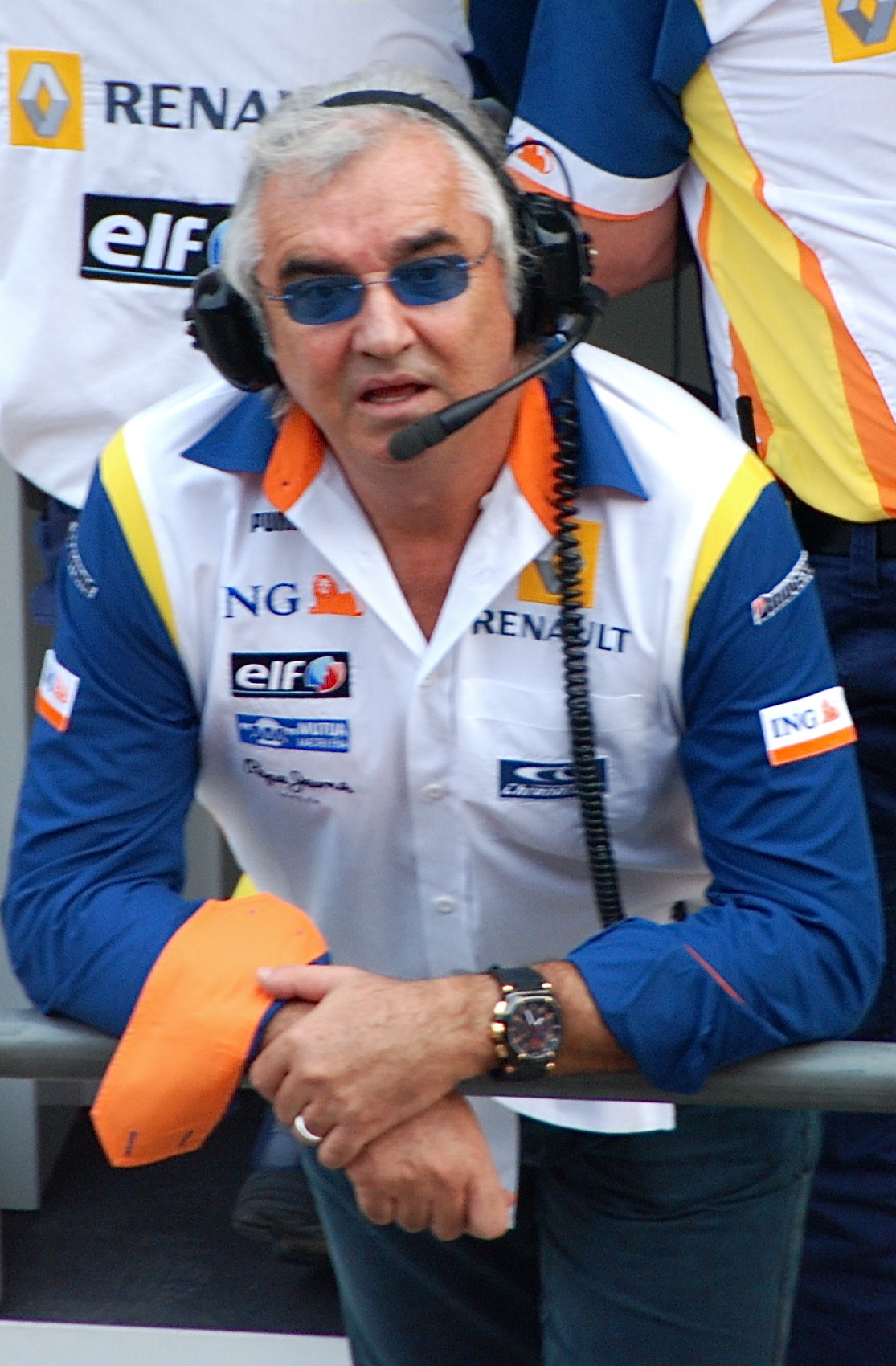
Briatore at the Chinese Grand Prix, 2008

On 11 September, the day after Piquet Jr.'s statement to the FIA was leaked, Renault F1 stated that it intended to take legal action against Piquet Jr. and his father in both French and British courts, stating that "...today the ING Renault F1 Team and its managing director Flavio Briatore personally wish to state they have commenced criminal proceedings against Nelson Piquet Jr and Nelson Piquet Sr in France concerning the making of false allegations and a related attempt to blackmail the team into allowing Mr Piquet Jr to drive for the remainder of the 2009 season". In response to the legal action, Piquet Jr. stated "Because I am telling the truth I have nothing to fear, whether from the Renault team or Mr Briatore – and while I am well aware of the power and influence of those being investigated, and the vast resources at their disposal, I will not be bullied again into making a decision I regret".

On 14 September 2009, Symonds was also reported to have been offered immunity from action if he provided the FIA with details of the alleged conspiracy. Symonds was reported to have told FIA investigators that the initial idea of a crash had come from Piquet Jr.

On 15 September, The Times published extracts of Renault F1 radio conversations transmitted before and after the Singapore Grand Prix between Renault F1 personnel including Piquet Jr., Alonso, Symonds and Briatore.

=== Briatore and Symonds depart Renault ===
On 16 September the Renault F1 team announced it would not be contesting the charges at the meeting of the WMSC in Paris on 21 September, and stated that both Briatore and Symonds had left the team.

The ING Renault F1 Team will not dispute the recent allegations made by the FIA concerning the 2008 Singapore Grand Prix. It also wishes to state that its managing director, Flavio Briatore and its executive director of engineering, Pat Symonds, have left the team.

— Renault F1 statement, 16 September 2009

The FIA confirmed that 21 September meeting would still go ahead following the departure of Briatore and Symonds, with sanctions against Renault F1 still possible. The day after the Renault announcement, Renault confirmed Briatore had resigned from the team, while Briatore himself stated of his departure that "I was just trying to save the team. It's my duty. That's the reason I've finished."

== WMSC meeting ==
The meeting of the WMSC regarding the incident took place on 21 September 2009 in Paris. After a ninety-minute hearing, the council imposed a disqualification on Renault F1, suspended for two years. This meant that if a similar incident occurred before 2011, Renault F1 would be banned from Formula One. Briatore was banned indefinitely from any FIA-sanctioned event, while Symonds received a five-year ban. Furthermore, Briatore was indefinitely banned from managing drivers when the FIA stated that super licences would not be issued or renewed to any driver associated with him in the future. Alonso was cleared of wrongdoing; the FIA found no evidence that he or his mechanics knew anything about the scheme.

The WMSC came down hard on Briatore because he denied his involvement despite overwhelming evidence. Symonds, in contrast, had confessed, expressing his "eternal regret and shame" for his role in the scheme. In announcing the sanctions, the council stated that Renault F1's actions were serious enough to merit being thrown out of Formula One altogether. However, it opted to impose a suspended sentence because Renault F1 took swift action in forcing Briatore and Symonds to resign. The Daily Mirror described the de facto lifetime ban on Briatore as the harshest sanction ever imposed on an individual in the history of motorsport.

A major contribution to the punishment of Briatore and Symonds was the testimony of an unnamed "Witness X", a Renault F1 employee who was also present at the pre-race meeting but rejected the idea.

== Reaction ==
After Renault F1 were formally charged, the alleged offence was thought to be unprecedented within Formula One. The scandal followed two recent Formula One cheating scandals: a case of industrial espionage between teams (including Renault F1); and an instance of the 2008 World Champion Lewis Hamilton being found to have lied to race stewards in March 2009.

The scandal interrupted the team's parent company Renault S.A.'s launch of four electric vehicles at the Frankfurt Motor Show after journalists questioned Renault chief executive Carlos Ghosn over the affair, who directed all inquiries to Bernard Rey, chairman of Renault F1. On 17 September, Patrick Pelata, Renault S.A.'s chief operating officer, first representative from Renault to officially comment on the Singapore crash affair, stated that "The [Renault F1] team believes that a mistake has been made, and punishment must follow. Flavio Briatore considered himself to be morally responsible and resigned" and that the team would defer making a decision on the future options for the team. Pelata added that he did not wish the actions of Briatore and Symonds to "reflect upon the whole company and the entire Formula 1 team". In addition, Ghosn also called for calm and for Renault to "not react in the heat of the moment" while the Renault F1 team collaborated with the authorities, adding that "I am confident when the facts are established, we can take a very clear decision".

Former Jordan Grand Prix F1 team principal Eddie Jordan believed that the departure of Briatore and Symonds from Renault on 16 September was an effective admission of guilt. Former three-time Formula One World Champion and former team owner Sir Jackie Stewart said of the Singapore scandal that "There is something fundamentally rotten and wrong at the heart of Formula One. Never in my experience has Formula One been in such a mood of self-destruction. Millions of fans are amazed, if not disgusted, at a sport which now goes from crisis to crisis with everyone blaming everyone else." Former three-time Formula One World Champion and former Jaguar Racing team manager Niki Lauda, while comparing the Singapore incident to the 2007 espionage scandal, declared that "This [the Singapore crash incident], though, is new. The biggest damage ever. Now the FIA must punish Renault heavily to restore credibility in the sport." Former 1996 F1 World Champion Damon Hill described the Singapore crash as "not a very good episode" for the sport and said of the future of F1 that "I'm concerned the sport is going to suffer as a genuine challenge, which is what I always felt it should be and would like it to be, of skill and competitiveness". Former racing driver Eddie Irvine, who retired from Formula One at the end of 2002, believed that the response to the Singapore incident had been an overreaction, stating that "This [Singapore incident] is probably slightly on the wrong side of the cheating thing but in days past every team have done whatever they could to win – cheat, bend the rules, break the rules, sabotage opponents", "[t]his is just the FIA going on a crusade". He also speculated that the FIA would be lenient on Renault F1 and not expel them, due to the sport's current "shaky" condition after recent team departures.

Chief Sportswriter Simon Barnes of The Times, sparked debate over the incident when he labelled it "the worst single piece of cheating in the history of sport" primarily because of its "potentially lethal consequences" to Piquet Jr., the other drivers, marshals and spectators. Supporting Barnes, The Times' motor racing correspondent Edward Gorman cited the alleged top level pre-conceived elements of conspiracy that sought to sacrifice one team member to benefit another to put the incident on a par with controversies such as Ben Johnson, horse doping and illegal keels used in the America's Cup. Gorman then postulated that this incident was worse than those because Briatore and Symonds set in motion "an event of violent destruction, the consequences of which they could neither predict nor control." Matthew Syed countered that while the incident was premeditated, "unspeakably unethical" and dangerous, it was not nearly as reckless as the East German athletics doping scandal and other instances of long-term doping. Syed also argued that the Renault F1 team would not have been expecting injuries to result from the crash, in contrast to incidents such as the assault on ice skater Nancy Kerrigan.

Responding to Flavio Briatore's resignation from Renault F1, Formula One Management's Bernie Ecclestone stated that "It is a pity that Flavio has ended his Formula One career in this way", "You can't defend him at all. What he did was completely unnecessary. It's a pity that it's happened", although Ecclestone denied that the scandal would 'finish' the sport, citing the sport's recovery from the death of Ayrton Senna and the (first) retirement of seven-time World Champion Michael Schumacher.

=== Main sponsors leave Renault F1 ===
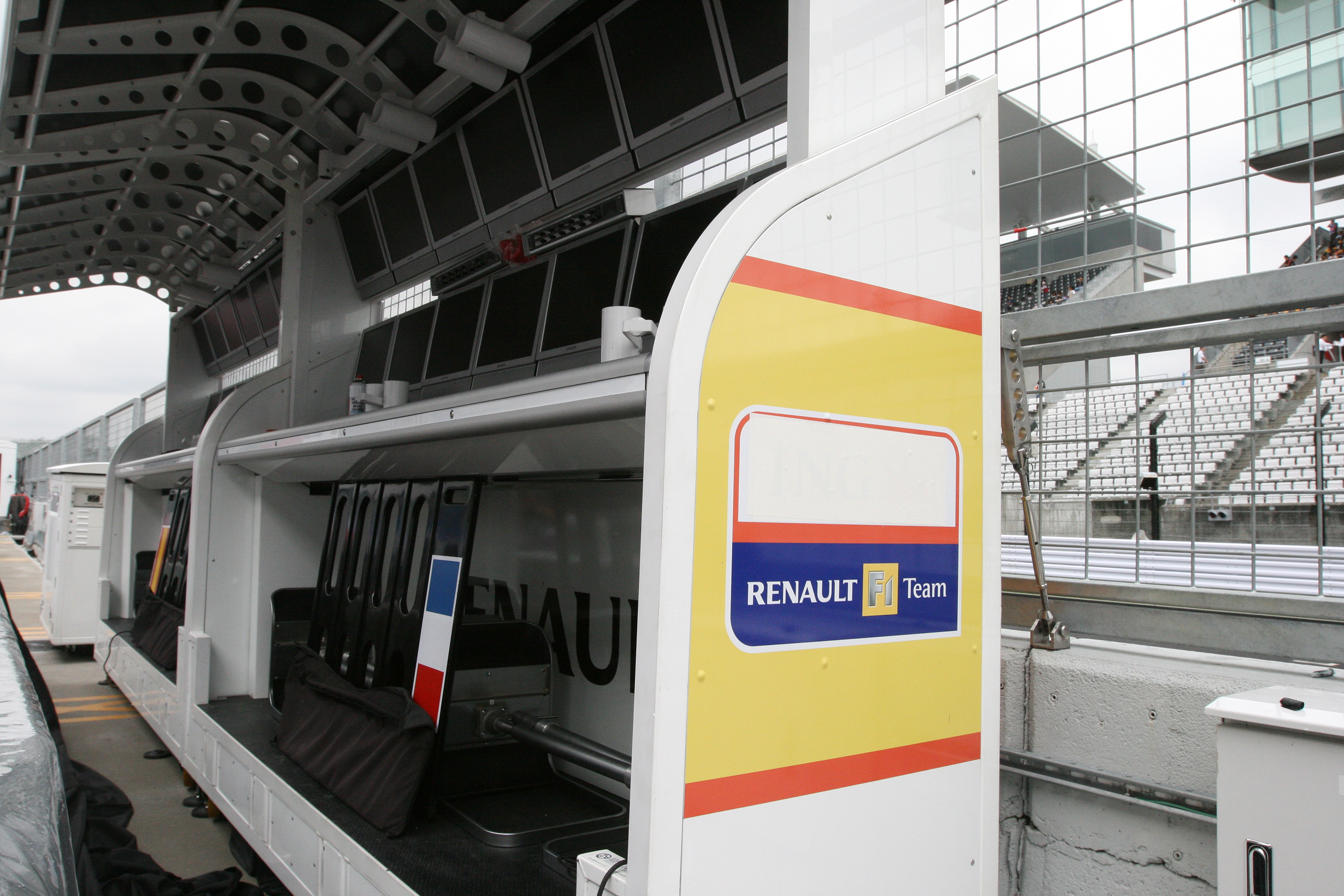
Renault F1 equipment on the pitwall at the 2009 Japanese Grand Prix with ING logos covered after the company ended their sponsorship.

In response to the scandal Renault F1's main sponsors ING and Mutua Madrileña ended their sponsorship agreements with Renault F1 early, within a week after the FIA's decision and right before the next race, the 2009 Singapore Grand Prix, with the team removing their logos from the cars before the event.

Major sponsor Mutua Madrileña withdrew its sponsorship of Renault F1 first, just before the 2009 Singapore Grand Prix weekend, believing that the situation "could affect the image, reputation and good name of the team's sponsors." Mutua Madrileña did not withdraw sponsorship of Renault F1 driver Fernando Alonso, as he was not implicated in the scandal. This was followed hours later by the withdrawal of title sponsor ING Group with immediate effect, who had been previously due to end their sponsorship of the team at the end of 2009.

=== Flavio Briatore's response ===
On 19 October 2009, Flavio Briatore announced his intentions to sue the FIA for his lifetime ban, claiming that "the FIA [had] been used as a tool of vengeance on behalf of one man" and that there were several miscarriages of justice, including a delay in summons, a failure to state the charges in advance and a lack of access to documents and "Witness X". On 5 January 2010, the French Tribunal de Grande Instance overturned his ban, and awarded him €15,000 in compensation. Symonds' ban was also overturned, and he was awarded €5,000 in compensation. Briatore was believed to be suing the FIA for damages in addition to getting his ban overturned, and has also stated his intention to pursue legal action against the Piquet family.

=== FIA appeal ===
On 11 January 2010, the FIA announced that they would appeal the decision of the Tribunal de Grande Instance to overturn the bans imposed on Briatore and Symonds. The FIA reinstated the bans while the appeal was active, but stated that drivers managed by Briatore would be granted their super licences for 2010. On 12 April, the FIA announced a settlement with Briatore and Symonds, and that the legal action had been ended. Both men agreed not to work in Formula One until 2013, nor any other FIA-sanctioned championship until the end of 2011.

=== Libel case against Renault F1 ===
On 7 December 2010 it was announced that Piquet Jr. and his father had won a libel case against Renault F1 at the High Court based on the allegations described above. Renault F1 apologised to the Piquets and paid them substantial damages. Admitting they libelled the duo, a Renault F1 statement read:

The team accepts, as it did before the World Motor Sport Council, that the allegations made by Nelson Piquet Junior were not false. It also accepts that Mr Piquet Junior and his father did not invent these allegations to blackmail the team into allowing him to drive for them for the remainder of the 2009 season. As a result, these serious allegations contained in our press release were wholly untrue and unfounded, and we withdraw them unequivocally. We would like to apologise unreservedly to Mr Piquet Junior and his father for the distress and embarrassment caused as a result. As a mark of the sincerity of our apology and regret, we have agreed to pay them a substantial amount of damages for libel as well as their costs, and have undertaken not to repeat these allegations at any time in the future.

== Potential consequences and aftermath ==
It was suggested in the media that if Briatore were personally found guilty of race-fixing, he might fail the English Football League's fit-and-proper-person test which applies to football club owners and directors, whose regulations exclude people who are "subject to a ban from a sports governing body relating to the administration of their sport", though a BBC report opined that his position might be secure given that he had left Renault. The Football League stated that they would wait for the conclusion of the investigation before examining Briatore's fitness to continue to be a director of Queens Park Rangers F.C. The Football League board discussed the matter on 8 October 2009 and declared that they would be awaiting a response from Briatore to various questions before commenting further. Briatore stepped down from the club in February 2010 as a result.

In addition to any sporting sanctions by the FIA, Renault F1, Piquet Jr. or even Felipe Massa could take legal action over the incident. It was speculated by the media that Briatore and Symonds could be extradited to Singapore to face criminal charges relating to the incident, which according to one lawyer could encompass "causing malicious or willful damage to property, endangering a vehicle and criminal conspiracy to commit a serious crime". This was thought to be unlikely however, with the Singaporean authorities believed to be unwilling to attract the negative publicity charges it would create, and also complicated by the fact that Singapore has an extradition treaty with the United Kingdom (Symonds being a British citizen) but not Italy as Briatore is an Italian citizen.

Piquet Jr. was criticized by many in the community and some suggest that the controversy effectively ended his hopes of continuing in Formula One. Martin Brundle, at the time the BBC's Formula One commentator, suggested that Piquet Jr. was now unemployable in Formula One, saying that no team or sponsor would want to be associated with the Piquet family. Brundle noted that Piquet Jr. "didn't deliver at Renault, he wasn't fast enough, that's why he was released and that's why he has dropped hand grenades into the system ever since". Brundle was also highly critical that Piquet Jr. escaped sanction from the FIA despite admitting to race-fixing, while the others involved were heavily punished. Other leading Formula One figures have echoed Brundle's sentiments. Toyota Racing principal John Howett was quoted as saying, "I think on his performance...disregarding the issue, I probably would not give him a drive and I would probably be further influenced in that decision by what took place." Christian Horner, team principal of Red Bull Racing, added, "I don't think we would have any interest [in Piquet Jr.] at Red Bull Racing."

Following the scandal Piquet Jr. would join NASCAR in the United States, competing full time in the Camping World Truck Series from 2011 to 2012 and the Nationwide Series in 2013. Piquet Jr. also competed full-time in Global Rallycross for SH racing from 2014 to 2015. In 2014–2015, Piquet Jr. took part in the inaugural Formula E season with China Racing, eventually becoming Formula E's inaugural champion by a single point over Sébastien Buemi. He would continue to compete full time in Formula E until he left midway through the 2018–19 season. As of 2024 Piquet Jr. competes full time in the Stock Car Pro Series for Cavaleiro Sports.

Despite the scandal, Alonso's career is said to have been untarnished by it, despite being the primary beneficiary of the crash. Following the accident he raced with Ferrari (2010-2014) and McLaren (2015-2018), then out of Formula One for two seasons before returning to race for Alpine from 2021 to 2022, and then for Aston Martin from 2023 onward. In 2014, Massa claimed that Alonso knew about the planned crash, despite being cleared by the FIA from such knowledge.

From 2011 to 2013, Symonds returned to F1 as a technical consultant for Virgin Racing (which later became Marussia in 2012). In 2013, he left the team to serve as chief technical officer of Williams from 2013 to 2016. In March 2017 Symonds was hired as Formula One's chief technical officer, a position he would hold until May 2024 when he became the executive engineering consultant for the Andretti Cadillac F1 program.

In 2022, Flavio Briatore returned to Formula One as an ambassador for the sport after more than a decade following Crashgate. He returned to Team Enstone in 2024 as a special advisor, and a year later, assumed the role of team principal.

In 2023, in an interview for The Mirror, Bernie Ecclestone said both he, and then-FIA President Max Mosley were made aware of what happened during the 2008 season. "Piquet Jr had told his father Nelson that he had been asked by the team to deliberately drive into the wall at a certain point in time in order to trigger a safety car phase and help his team-mate Alonso. We decided not to do anything for the time being. We wanted to protect the sport and save it from a huge scandal." He added: "There was a rule at the time that a world championship ranking was untouchable after the FIA awards ceremony at the end of the year. So Hamilton was presented with the world championship trophy and everything was fine." Due to this, it is his belief that Felipe Massa should have been the F1 drivers' world champion in 2008 and not Lewis Hamilton.

Following Ecclestone's comments, Massa was reported to have begun investigating whether he could take legal action to dispute the outcome of the 2008 world championship. Lewis Hamilton led the championship by one point going into the Singapore race, and emerged with a 7-point lead. Given that Hamilton eventually won the championship by one point with an overtake on Timo Glock in Brazil, Massa argues that Crashgate ultimately cost him the title. Former FIA president Jean Todt also backed Massa's claims suggesting the FIA should have cancelled the results of the race as soon as the allegations of race fixing first came to light in 2009.

== Legacy ==
In a 2018 retrospective article the BBC argued that nothing changed in Formula One as a result of the scandal and nobody in the sport wants to talk about it. In 2021 Motorsport.com listed the incident as one of biggest incidents of cheating in F1's history.

== See also ==
- Allegations of cheating in the 1994 Formula One season
- 2007 Formula One espionage controversy
- 2008 Formula One season
- 2008 Singapore Grand Prix
- 2009 Formula One season
- 2013 Federated Auto Parts 400, another case of a driver intentionally causing a safety car to manipulate the results of the race
- List of scandals with "-gate" suffix
- List of sporting scandals
