= Howett =

Howett may refer to:

People

- John Howett (b. ? ), British automobile sales, manufacturing, and racing executive
- Mark Howett (b. 1963), Australian theatre, film, and opera director, designer, and lighting designer
- Roberta Howett (b. 1981), Irish singer

Ships

- USS Howett (PF-84), a United States Navy patrol frigate transferred to the United Kingdom while under construction which served in the Royal Navy as the frigate HMS Papua (K588) from 1944 to 1945
