= Tadashi Yamashina =

Former Formula One team principal

- Born: 8 May 1951 (age 75)

Tadashi Yamashina (born 8 May 1951) is the former Team Principal of the Toyota Racing Formula One team, responsible for conducting Toyota's Formula One operations, having taken over from Tsutomu Tomita in June 2007.

== Career ==
Yamashina started work for the Toyota Motor Corporation in 1977, working his way up through the company ranks to become the project general manager at the companies Component & System Development Center’s Vehicle Engineering Division in 1998. Following this, he received a further promotion in 2001 to become the President of the Toyota Technical Centre in the United States, eventually becoming Vice Chairman of Toyota Motorsport in 2006, succeeding Tomita as F1 Team Principal and Chairman in June 2007.

Toyota withdrew from Formula One at the end of the 2009 season but Yamashina remained chairman of Toyota Motorsport GmbH.
