= 2005 Australian Grand Prix =

Coordinates: 37°50′59″S 144°58′06″E

Race 1 of 19 in the 2005 Formula One World Championship
← Previous race	Next race →

Race details
- Date: 6 March 2005
- Official name: 2005 Formula 1 Foster's Australian Grand Prix
- Location: Melbourne Grand Prix Circuit, Melbourne, Australia
- Course: Temporary street circuit
- Course length: 5.303 km (3.295 miles)
- Distance: 57 laps, 302.271 km (187.823 miles)
- Scheduled distance: 58 laps, 307.574 km (191.118 miles)
- Weather: Cool, partly cloudy
- Attendance: 118,200

Pole position
Driver	(Italy) Giancarlo Fisichella	Renault
- Time: 3:01.460 (aggregate)

Fastest lap
Driver	(Spain) Fernando Alonso	Renault
- Time: 1:25.683 on lap 24

Podium
First	(Italy) Giancarlo Fisichella	Renault
Second	(Brazil) Rubens Barrichello	Ferrari
Third	(Spain) Fernando Alonso	Renault

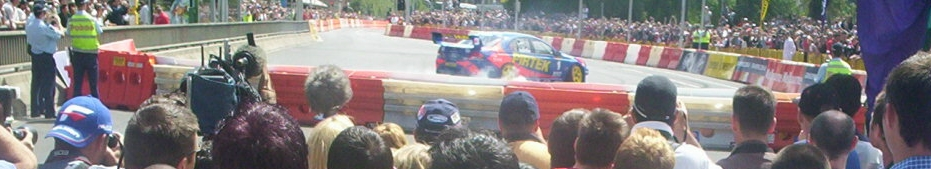
Demonstration event held in Melbourne just before the start of the 2005 Grand Prix

The 2005 Australian Grand Prix (officially the 2005 Formula 1 Foster's Australian Grand Prix) was a Formula One motor race held at the Melbourne Grand Prix Circuit on 6 March 2005. It was the first round of the 2005 Formula One season. The 58-lap race was won by Renault driver Giancarlo Fisichella after he started from pole position. Rubens Barrichello finished second for the Ferrari team and Fisichella's team-mate Fernando Alonso came in third. Fisichella led the championship only after this race. This would be the last time an Italian driver led the championship until Kimi Antonelli led the 2026 championship.

This race marked the debut of Red Bull Racing; the team was bought and previously known as Jaguar Racing.

== Friday drivers ==
The bottom 6 teams in the 2004 Constructors' Championship were entitled to run a third car in free practice on Friday. These drivers drove on Friday but did not compete in qualifying or the race.

Constructor	Nat	Driver
McLaren-Mercedes	(Spain)	Pedro de la Rosa
Sauber-Petronas		-
Red Bull-Cosworth	(Italy)	Vitantonio Liuzzi
Toyota	(Brazil)	Ricardo Zonta
Jordan-Toyota	(Monaco)	Robert Doornbos
Minardi-Cosworth		-

== Report ==
=== Background ===
The 2005 Australian Grand Prix was the first round the 2005 FIA Formula One World Championship held at Albert Park Circuit in Melbourne. For the event eight of the ten entered teams arrived in Melbourne with all-new for 2005 chassis with both Ferrari and Minardi opting to start the season with modified 2004 chassis - adapting them in order to make them compliant with the 2005 technical regulations. Minardi participated in both qualifying and the race having eventually decided to modify the PS04B chassis after dropping legal action against the FIA after the governing body refused to allow the Faenza team to run their cars in the original 2004 specification which had seen the team not run in Friday Practice.

=== Practice ===
The first practice session of the 2005 Australian Grand Prix was dominated by Vitantonio Liuzzi who was appearing at his first Grand Prix for Red Bull at their first race. Twenty-two cars participated with reserve drivers Pedro de la Rosa for McLaren, Ricardo Zonta for Toyota, Robert Doornbos for Jordan and Liuzzi for Red Bull. Neither of the Minardis ran. Juan Pablo Montoya was fourth fastest while Rubens Barrichello was only 12th. Michael Schumacher didn't participate in this session. The only casualty was Narain Karthikeyan for Jordan whose engine blew up after 6 laps.

Pedro de la Rosa and Kimi Räikkönen put their McLarens fastest in the second session just ahead of Nick Heidfeld and Michael Schumacher. Juan Pablo Montoya was left fifth with a happy Felipe Massa sixth. The main drama was Vitantonio Liuzzi's spin at turn three which left him in the gravel and he had to abandon the car. Narain Karthikeyan was hit with a fine with him speeding in the pit lane during his first ever outing in the last practice session with a speed of 86.2 km/h his fine was US$6750. Once again both Minardis didn't take part.

After the overnight rain in Australia the track was wet for the start of the third practice session with the Ferraris of Michael Schumacher and Rubens Barrichello leading the way ahead of Kimi Räikkönen in the McLaren. Both Minardis got to run but Christijan Albers spun on his final lap at Turn 3. Neither of the Sauber, Williams or Renault drivers set lap times but Christian Klien and Juan Pablo Montoya did go out as did Mark Webber but spun twice on his only lap.

The final session got underway and the dampness of the track led to times all over the place but Kimi Räikkönen and Fernando Alonso did well to fight for fastest with the Finn coming out best. Juan Pablo Montoya put in a last gasp lap for 3rd ahead of Giancarlo Fisichella and Jenson Button. Another drama for Narain Karthikeyan as he spun at turn nine and had to abandon his car before it briefly caught fire.

=== Qualifying ===
Prior to the session several teams' weather forecasts predicted a rain storm after 20 minutes. To begin with the track was merely damp after the early morning rain. The session was run the reverse order of the 2004 Brazilian Grand Prix as Christijan Albers shaded teammate Patrick Friesacher to set fastest time. Despite spinning in Turn 12 on his out lap, Narain Karthikeyan went 5 seconds faster than the Minardis with his teammate following behind.

Jenson Button had been an early retirement in Interlagos the previous year, so he had to go out fifth and quickly went fastest with a 1m 41.512. Williams drivers Nick Heidfeld and Mark Webber beat Button's time with 1m 39.717 and a 1m 36.717 respectively. Christian Klien moved to second place before Jarno Trulli put his Toyota on pole with a 1m 35.270.

A disappointing 1m 38.320 for David Coulthard in the Red Bull, the Scot was complaining of poor balance. Jacques Villeneuve was the first man to put on the dry tyre but it looked like he'd got it wrong as he spun wildly on his out lap. He brought his Sauber home for 3rd place before Giancarlo Fisichella put in a 1m 33.171 to take fastest time before the rain.

The torrential rain arrived just as Felipe Massa started his flying lap on the dry tyre, he had to abort his lap and had to settle for 20th. Michael Schumacher switched to his wet Bridgestone tyre and the 7 time world champion could only do a 1m 57.931 to put him 18th after all the drivers finished.

The session had to be stopped when Takuma Sato in the BAR crashed at Turn 8 on his out lap. When the session resumed the conditions had slightly improved and Ralf Schmacher's lap put him 17th. Fernando Alonso settled for 14th and Rubens Barrichello qualified 12th.

Last out were Juan Pablo Montoya and Kimi Räikkönen (McLaren teammates), but both had to fight for 10th and 11th fastest on the list.

=== Race ===
The first attempt to start the race was yellow flagged, due to the stalled McLaren of Kimi Räikkönen, who would eventually start the abbreviated race (57 laps from 58) in pit lane. When the red lights did finally go out, front row starters Fisichella and Jarno Trulli protected their positions and led the rest of the field through the first lap. Starting third in his home grand prix, Mark Webber– in his Williams debut– was outsprinted to the first corner by David Coulthard's Red Bull. Rubens Barrichello and Fernando Alonso each moved up three spots on the first lap, showing more of their cars' true potential than what was seen in the rain-soaked qualifying. Sato made the best start, moving from last place to 14th. Jacques Villeneuve had the worst start– his first in the Sauber– as he dropped five positions on the opening lap after losing forward momentum in a first-corner position skirmish.

As Fisichella and Trulli raced away at the front, Coulthard began to gradually fall back, holding up Webber, Nick Heidfeld (also making his Williams debut), Christian Klien, Juan Pablo Montoya and Barrichello. Several seconds further back was Villeneuve, struggling to hold off a charging Alonso, who was himself just ahead of Jenson Button and Ralf Schumacher (in his first start for Toyota). Close behind were Felipe Massa, Sato, the elder Schumacher, and Räikkönen, who doggedly pursued the champion but could not find a way past. The four rookies were a little further back: the two Jordans of Tiago Monteiro and Narain Karthikeyan led the Minardi duo of Patrick Friesacher and Christijan Albers.

Alonso passed Villeneuve, only to have the Canadian retake the position moments later. But just before the first round of pit stops, Alonso would finally find a way around the former champion, saving any podium hopes for the young Spaniard. While passing backmarkers on lap 15, Coulthard and Webber nearly collided with one another; Webber briefly went onto the grass, but no serious damage was done. After lap 17, unable to pull out of the pits due to a gearbox problem, Albers retired his Minardi, which had lost second gear as early as the formation lap. This was the only mechanical retirement of the afternoon.

Fisichella remained firmly in command after his first pit stop, although he briefly relinquished the lead while refueling. Barrichello gained the most in the pits, as he moved up from eighth to fourth place; Alonso continued his hard charge, gaining four positions as well. However, Trulli's Toyota slowly began dropping back, getting passed again and again; it would later turn out to be a blistered rear tyre, which would affect him for the remainder of the race. Teammate Ralf Schumacher had a problem of his own, and was forced to pit twice in quick succession to tighten a loose safety harness. Räikkönen was able to get by the elder Schumacher into tenth (his starting grid position) and pull away from the champion in pursuit of Heidfeld.

After Michael Schumacher's second stop, he emerged from the pitlane just ahead of Heidfeld, who thought he saw an opening going into the third turn. Schumacher, who momentarily lost sight of Heidfeld's Williams in his mirrors, closed the door on his fellow German, forcing him onto the grass. With no traction on the grass, Heidfeld braked in vain, sliding into the side of the F2004M, pushing both cars into the gravel. Heidfeld's race was finished; although Schumacher was able to get his Ferrari back on track, nevertheless he retired in the pits soon thereafter, due to collision damage.

Montoya went onto the grass briefly at Turn Eight as he prepared to make his second pit stop; this, plus another off-track excursion while tangling with a backmarking rookie, cost him valuable time. When he later lost part of his rear deflector, Montoya eased up to finish the race and to preserve his Mercedes-Benz power plant for the next race. Teammate Räikkönen also lost a significant portion of his deflector, which became embedded under his side barge board; mechanics were later seen removing it during a pit stop.

After the second round of stops, the final order of finish was nearly determined. While most of the field slowed to conserve their engines, Alonso continued pushing hard on Barrichello's heels. Barrichello, despite battling a brake balance problem, was able to answer the challenge, and held off Alonso for second. Fisichella, who flawlessly managed the gap to his nearest opponent all race long, easily took the chequered flag for his second career victory, with his only other victory being for Jordan in 2003. He never put a foot wrong, and his R25 chassis, although not seriously challenged, performed flawlessly to claim the inaugural race of the season. Teammate Alonso clocked the fastest lap of the race, and was noticeably the fastest car on track for most of the event.

Both BARs pulled into the pits on the final lap of the race; by not officially finishing the event, they effectively exempted themselves from the new two-race engine rule. By taking advantage of this loophole in 2005 regulations, they were entitled to replace the cars' Honda engines in Malaysia without incurring any penalty. The loophole was immediately closed, as a car was in future required to have a genuine technical problem to be entitled to a new engine.

== Classification ==
=== Qualifying ===
Pos	No	Driver	Constructor	Q1	Q2	Total	Gap	Grid
1	6	(Italy) Giancarlo Fisichella	Renault	1:33.171	1:28.289	3:01.460		1
2	16	(Italy) Jarno Trulli	Toyota	1:35.270	1:29.159	3:04.429	+2.969	2
3	7	(Australia) Mark Webber	Williams-BMW	1:36.717	1:28.279	3:04.996	+3.536	3
4	11	(Canada) Jacques Villeneuve	Sauber-Petronas	1:36.984	1:29.862	3:06.846	+5.386	4
5	14	(United Kingdom) David Coulthard	Red Bull-Cosworth	1:38.320	1:28.892	3:07.212	+5.752	5
6	15	(Austria) Christian Klien	Red Bull-Cosworth	1:37.486	1:29.991	3:07.477	+6.017	6
7	8	(Germany) Nick Heidfeld	Williams-BMW	1:39.717	1:29.413	3:09.130	+7.670	7
8	3	(United Kingdom) Jenson Button	BAR-Honda	1:41.512	1:30.616	3:12.128	+10.668	8
9	10	(Colombia) Juan Pablo Montoya	McLaren-Mercedes	1:45.325	1:29.320	3:14.645	+13.185	9
10	9	(Finland) Kimi Räikkönen	McLaren-Mercedes	1:44.997	1:30.561	3:15.558	+14.098	10
11	2	(Brazil) Rubens Barrichello	Ferrari	1:45.481	1:31.341	3:16.822	+15.362	11
12	19	(India) Narain Karthikeyan	Jordan-Toyota	1:44.357	1:32.735	3:17.092	+15.632	12
13	5	(Spain) Fernando Alonso	Renault	1:47.708	1:29.758	3:17.466	+16.006	13
14	18	(Portugal) Tiago Monteiro	Jordan-Toyota	1:46.846	1:33.483	3:20.329	+18.869	14
15	17	(Germany) Ralf Schumacher	Toyota	1:51.495	1:31.222	3:22.717	+21.257	15
16	20	(Austria) Patrick Friesacher	Minardi-Cosworth	1:50.864	1:37.499	3:28.363	+26.903	16
17	21	(Netherlands) Christijan Albers	Minardi-Cosworth	1:49.230	No time^{3}			17
18	1	(Germany) Michael Schumacher	Ferrari	1:57.931	No time^{4}			19^{6}
19	4	(Japan) Takuma Sato	BAR-Honda	No time^{1}	No time^{4}			20^{6}
20	12	(Brazil) Felipe Massa	Sauber-Petronas	No time^{2}	No time^{5}			18

Notes

- ^1 – Takuma Sato did not get a time in Q1 after going out on a wet track.
- ^2 – Felipe Massa did not get a time in Q1 after abandoning the attempt after driving on dry tires on a wet track.
- ^3 – Christijan Albers did not get time in Q2 after as the red light turned red before he could get on the track.
- ^4 – Michael Schumacher and Takuma Sato did not get time in Q2 after, having already received a 10-place grid penalty for an engine change.
- ^5 – Felipe Massa did not get a time in Q2 with no time in the first session, there was no point setting one in the second.
- ^6 – Michael Schumacher and Takuma Sato received a 10-place grid penalty for engine changes.

=== Race ===
Pos	No	Driver	Constructor	Tyre	Laps	Time/Retired	Grid	Points
1	6	(Italy) Giancarlo Fisichella	Renault	M	57	1:24:17.336	1	10
2	2	(Brazil) Rubens Barrichello	Ferrari	B	57	+5.553	11	8
3	5	(Spain) Fernando Alonso	Renault	M	57	+6.712	13	6
4	14	(United Kingdom) David Coulthard	Red Bull-Cosworth	M	57	+16.131	5	5
5	7	(Australia) Mark Webber	Williams-BMW	M	57	+16.908	3	4
6	10	(Colombia) Juan Pablo Montoya	McLaren-Mercedes	M	57	+35.033	9	3
7	15	(Austria) Christian Klien	Red Bull-Cosworth	M	57	+38.997	6	2
8	9	(Finland) Kimi Räikkönen	McLaren-Mercedes	M	57	+39.633	PL^{1}	1
9	16	(Italy) Jarno Trulli	Toyota	M	57	+1:03.108	2	
10	12	(Brazil) Felipe Massa	Sauber-Petronas	M	57	+1:04.393	18	
11	3	(United Kingdom) Jenson Button	BAR-Honda	M	56	Withdrawn	8	
12	17	(Germany) Ralf Schumacher	Toyota	M	56	+1 Lap	15	
13	11	(Canada) Jacques Villeneuve	Sauber-Petronas	M	56	+1 Lap	4	
14	4	(Japan) Takuma Sato	BAR-Honda	M	55	Withdrawn	20	
15	19	(India) Narain Karthikeyan	Jordan-Toyota	B	55	+2 Laps	12	
16	18	(Portugal) Tiago Monteiro	Jordan-Toyota	B	55	+2 Laps	14	
17	20	(Austria) Patrick Friesacher	Minardi-Cosworth	B	53	+4 Laps	16	
Ret	1	(Germany) Michael Schumacher	Ferrari	B	42	Collision damage	19	
Ret	8	(Germany) Nick Heidfeld	Williams-BMW	M	42	Collision	7	
Ret	21	(Netherlands) Christijan Albers	Minardi-Cosworth	B	16	Gearbox	17	

Notes

- ^1 – Kimi Räikkönen started the race from the pitlane.

== Championship standings after the race ==
Drivers' Championship standings

Pos	Driver	Points
1	(Italy) Giancarlo Fisichella	10
2	(Brazil) Rubens Barrichello	8
3	(Spain) Fernando Alonso	6
4	(United Kingdom) David Coulthard	5
5	(Australia) Mark Webber	4

Constructors' Championship standings

Pos	Constructor	Points
1	(France) Renault	16
2	(Italy) Ferrari	8
3	(United Kingdom) Red Bull-Cosworth	7
4	(United Kingdom) Williams-BMW	4
5	(United Kingdom) McLaren-Mercedes	4

- Note: Only the top five positions are included for both sets of standings.

Previous race: 2004 Brazilian Grand Prix	FIA Formula One World Championship; 2005 season	Next race: 2005 Malaysian Grand Prix
Previous race: 2004 Australian Grand Prix	Australian Grand Prix	Next race: 2006 Australian Grand Prix
