= Tsutomu Tomita =

Japanese motorsport team owner (born 1943)

- Born: 14 October 1943 (age 82)

Tsutomu Tomita (Japanese: 冨田務, Hepburn: Tomita Tsutomu; born October 14, 1943) is the president of Fuji Speedway from 2007. He was the chairman of Toyota Motorsport GmbH (TMG, ex-Toyota Team Europe) and team principal of Toyota F1, the Formula One racing branch of Toyota, until June 2007.

== Career ==
Born and raised in Japan, Tomita first joined Toyota Motor Corporation in 1969 as an engine development engineer. He continually worked his way up the corporate ladder, becoming the executive in charge of all Toyota racing engines by 1987. In 1996, he became a member of the board of directors, responsible for all of Toyota's international motorsport activities.

Many credit Tomita as being the driving force behind Toyota's decision to enter Formula One in 2002. He did not want Toyota to enter F1 as merely an engine supplier; instead, his vision was for the Japanese automobile giant to form its own "works" team. Toyota has now joined Ferrari and Renault as the only teams producing F1 cars completely from scratch, including the engine, chassis, brakes, suspension and electronics.

During the 2003 Formula One season, Tomita relocated to the Toyota Motorsport factory in Cologne, Germany to personally oversee the team's F1 activities. In January 2004, Tomita was elevated to the role of team principal, managing every aspect of Toyota's F1 endeavors. Tomita has recently expanded Toyota's influence in Formula One, announcing that rebadged Toyota engines would be powering Jordan cars in 2005. This deal carried through to 2006, when the team was renamed Midland F1 and then Spyker F1. During the 2006 Formula One season, Tomita announced that the Toyota F1 team would supply the Williams F1 team with engines from 2007 to at least 2008.

In April 2007, Tomita announced he would be leaving his post as Toyota F1 team principal to return to work for the company in Japan. Tadashi Yamashina was announced as the person taking over the role. Tomita's exit took place in June.
