= Toyota in Formula One =

2002–2009 Formula One team representing Toyota

Toyota
- Full name: Panasonic Toyota Racing
- Base: Cologne, Germany
- Noted staff: Tsutomu Tomita; Tadashi Yamashina; Ove Andersson; John Howett; Gustav Brunner; Mike Gascoyne; Pascal Vasselon
- Noted drivers: (United Kingdom) Allan McNish (Finland) Mika Salo (France) Olivier Panis (Brazil) Ricardo Zonta (Brazil) Cristiano da Matta (Italy) Jarno Trulli (Germany) Ralf Schumacher (Germany) Timo Glock (Japan) Kamui Kobayashi

Formula One World Championship career
- First entry: 2002 Australian Grand Prix
- Races entered: 140 (139 starts)
- Engines: Toyota
- Constructors' Championships: 0 (best finish: 4th, 2005)
- Drivers' Championships: 0 (best finish: 6th, 2005)
- Race victories: 0
- Podiums: 13
- Points: 278.5
- Pole positions: 3
- Fastest laps: 3
- Final entry: 2009 Abu Dhabi Grand Prix

Toyota as a Formula One engine manufacturer
Formula One World Championship career
- First entry: 2002 Australian Grand Prix
- Last entry: 2009 Abu Dhabi Grand Prix
- Races entered: 140
- Chassis: Toyota, Jordan, MF1, Williams
- Constructors' Championships: 0
- Drivers' Championships: 0
- Race victories: 0
- Podiums: 17
- Points: 384
- Pole positions: 3
- Fastest laps: 4

Panasonic Toyota Racing was a Formula One team owned by the Japanese automobile manufacturer Toyota Motor Corporation and based in Cologne, Germany. Toyota announced their plans to join Formula One in 1999, and after extensive testing with their initial car, dubbed the TF101, the team made their debut in 2002. The new team grew from Toyota's long-standing Toyota Motorsport GmbH organisation, which had previously competed in the World Rally Championship and the 24 Hours of Le Mans. Despite scoring a point in their first-ever race, Toyota never won a Grand Prix, their best finish being second, which they achieved five times. On 4 November 2009, Toyota announced its immediate withdrawal from Formula One, ending the team's involvement in the sport after eight consecutive seasons.

Unlike its compatriot rival manufacturer Honda that had more success in the sport, Toyota drew criticism for their lack of success as they never managed to win a Grand Prix with one of the sport's biggest budgets along with being the world's largest car manufacturer. Toyota was a well-funded team, but despite this, strong results had never been consistent.

In October 2024, the Toyota name returned to Formula One with the company signing a technical partnership with Haas F1 Team through Toyota Gazoo Racing (TGR). In December 2025, this partnership was expanded to a title partnership with Haas being rebranded as TGR Haas F1 Team.

== Racing history ==
=== 1957–2002: origins ===
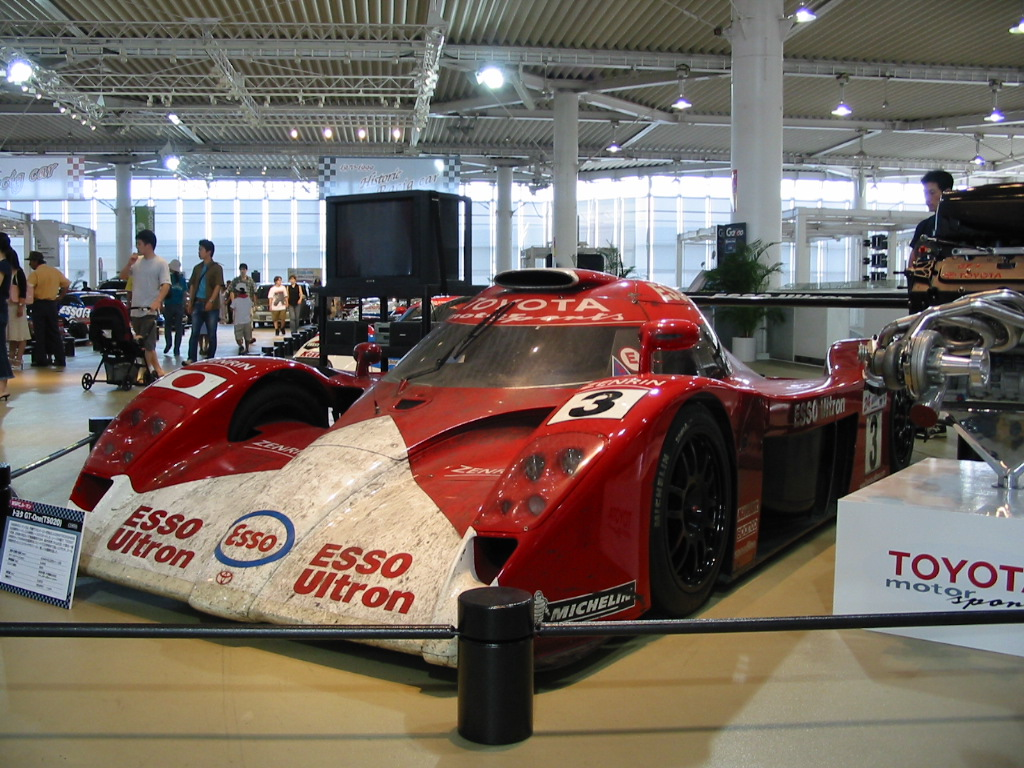
The Toyota GT-One entered the 1998 and 1999 24 Hours of Le Mans with ex-Formula One drivers Martin Brundle, Thierry Boutsen and Ukyo Katayama. The car itself was competitive in terms of speed; however, reliability problems denied the team a win on both occasions.

Toyota made an early entrance into motorsport when a Toyopet Crown entered the Round Australia Trial in 1957. The Formula One team's roots can be traced to a later development in 1972, when Swede Ove Andersson's Andersson Motorsport team used a Toyota Celica 1600GT in the RAC Rally in Great Britain. The team was later renamed Toyota Team Europe and then, after being bought by Toyota in 1993, Toyota Motorsport GmbH. The rally team won four World Rally Championship drivers' titles, most notably with Carlos Sainz, as well as three constructors' titles. The FIA banned the team from competition for 12 months at the end of 1995 for running illegal parts, causing the team unable to race at next season (Toyota's official regional teams entered the Celica GT-Four the next season, but the suspension meant they were ineligible for manufacturer's points). Toyota continued to win rallies after their return in 1997, but did not achieve the same level of dominance.

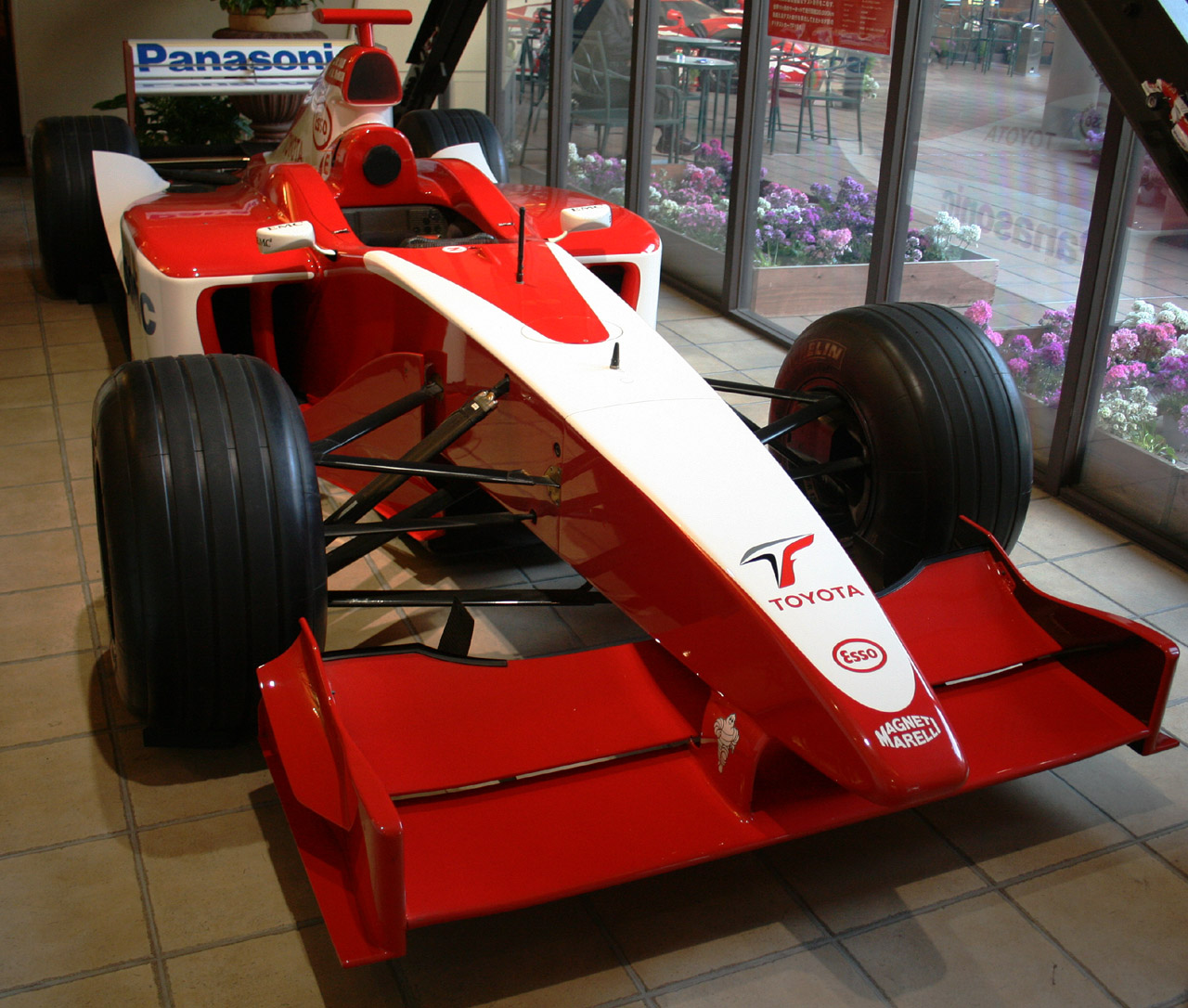
The first Formula One test car of Toyota, the TF101 (2001)

In 1997 the team moved into track racing with a sports car project, twice failing to win the Le Mans 24 Hours. On 21 January 1999 Toyota announced its move into Formula One. The company ended its rallying and Le Mans programs in order to concentrate on Formula One. On 30 June 2000 the team secured its place as the 12th entry for the 2002 Formula One season. Originally intending to enter F1 in 2001, Toyota forfeited an $11 million deposit by delaying their entry. Unusually, Toyota opted to start their own works team rather than partner with a specialist race team and chassis manufacturer. The team was also set up away from Formula One's traditional manufacturing centre in "Motorsport Valley" in the United Kingdom. During 2001, Toyota tested with their prototype TF101 (AM01) car and drivers at 11 F1 circuits. The idea was to gain telemetry data for the races, which allowed them to make aerodynamic changes for the TF102, and for the drivers to experience the tracks in the new cars. Finn Mika Salo, who can communicate in Japanese, and Scotsman Allan McNish, who drove the GT-One during the 1999 24 Hours of Le Mans, were appointed as test drivers.

=== 2002–2004: early years ===
==== 2002 ====
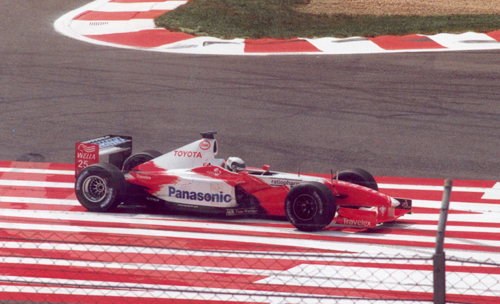
Allan McNish at the 2002 French Grand Prix. The Scot qualified in seventeenth place, but retired from the race with an engine problem although he did complete enough laps to be classified eleventh.

Toyota F1 team, holding a Japanese racing licence, made their Formula One debut in 2002, with McNish and Salo driving the Toyota TF102, designed by Gustav Brunner. Despite reportedly having one of the biggest budgets in Formula One, Toyota scored only two points all year. Their first point was scored in their first race, the Australian Grand Prix, when half the field was eliminated by a first corner accident caused by Ralf Schumacher colliding with Rubens Barrichello. The team could have scored another point in the next race at the Malaysian Grand Prix, but Salo suffered an electrical misfire and the team fumbled McNish's pit stop. The Scot thus lost ground, and finished seventh, just out of the points, behind Sauber's Felipe Massa. The Brazilian Grand Prix, third race of the season, yielded Toyota's second and final point, once again scored by Salo. McNish endured a huge crash during practice for the end-of-season Japanese Grand Prix and missed the race on medical advice. Neither McNish nor Salo were offered a race seat for 2003.

==== 2003 ====
For the 2003 season, Toyota signed Brazilian Cristiano da Matta, who had won the American ChampCar series the previous year using a Toyota powered car, and former BAR driver Olivier Panis to take over the racing duties from Salo and McNish. A wider points system were just what Toyota needed to score points in 2003. The team managed several points finishes during the season, but only as high as fifth place in Germany.

High points of the season included Toyotas running first and second in the British Grand Prix, thanks to making their pit stops whilst the safety car was out, and Panis qualifying third at the US Grand Prix. At the end of the season, the team had accumulated sixteen points, an improvement on the previous season, but still only 8th in the constructors' championship, ahead of the struggling Jordan Grand Prix team and Minardi.

==== 2004 ====
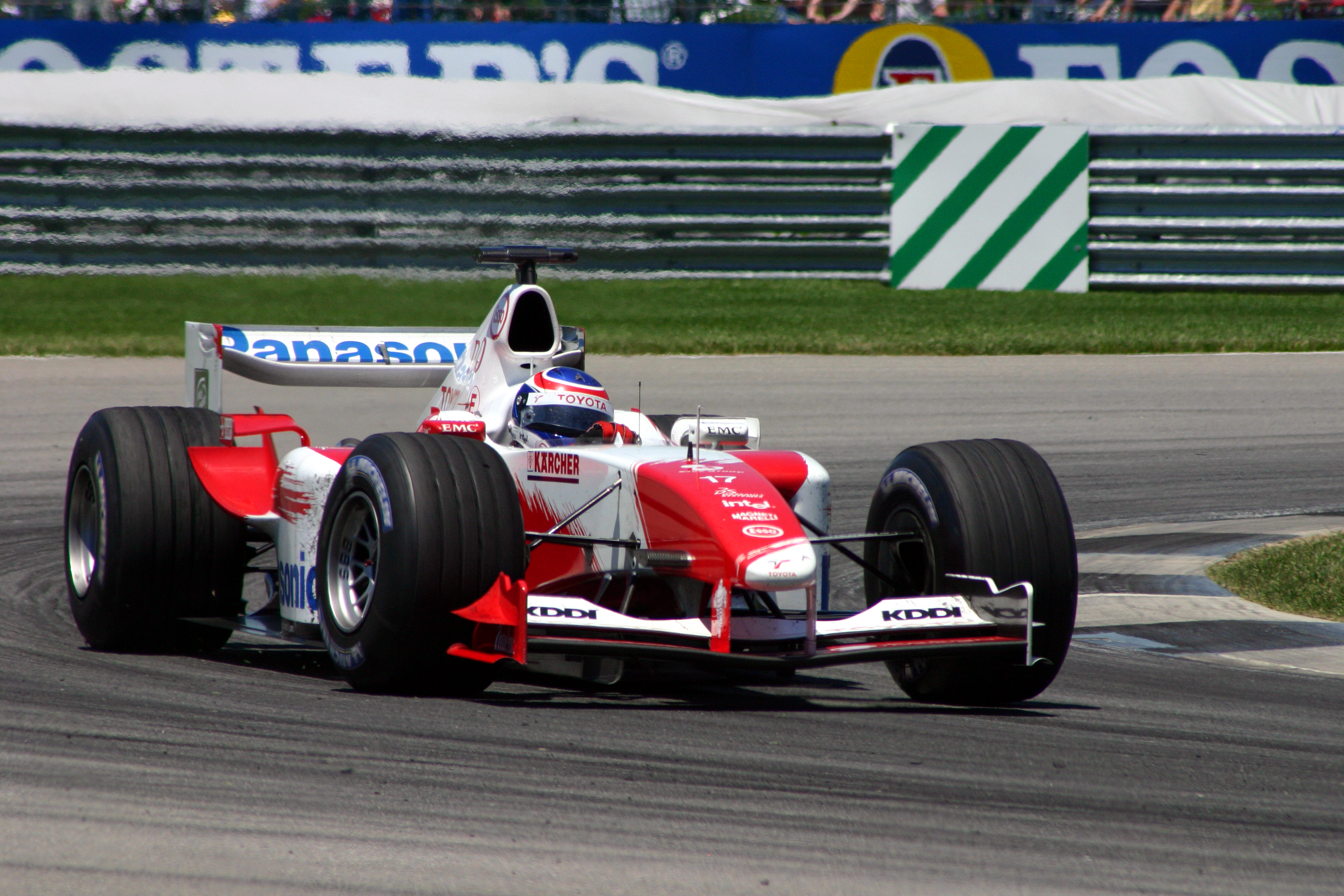
Olivier Panis driving the Toyota TF104 at the 2004 United States Grand Prix at Indianapolis. He finished the race in 5th.

Toyota retained their driver line-up for 2004, but the season proved difficult. Both Toyotas (together with Williams cars) were disqualified from the Canadian Grand Prix for running illegal parts. Cristiano da Matta, following disappointing performances, left the team after the German Grand Prix and was replaced by fellow Brazilian Ricardo Zonta, who had been the team's third driver. Zonta drove for Toyota for the subsequent four rounds, before being replaced by Italian Jarno Trulli, who had left the Renault works team. Panis, meanwhile, announced his retirement from racing, and bowed out before the final race of the season in Brazil to allow Zonta, who had stepped aside for Trulli, to compete in his home race. Neither Trulli nor Zonta scored points for the team in those late season races, although Trulli qualified well in both Grands Prix he took part in. Toyota brought in ex-Jordan and Renault designer Mike Gascoyne early in the year to oversee the development of the car, which improved during the year. The team scored just over half the points they scored in 2003, but equalled their best finish of fifth at the United States Grand Prix with Panis and maintained their 8th place in the constructors' championship.

==== Industrial espionage ====
2004 also saw Toyota being accused of industrial espionage in the case of stolen data files from Ferrari. This following a season where many Formula One fans commented on similarities of the Toyota TF104 to the Ferrari F2003-GA. The district attorney of Cologne, where Toyota F1 is based, led the investigation saying "It's an immense amount of material. We'd need over 10 thousand pages to print everything," in relation to the number of documents generated in the design of any modern F1 car. Toyota refused to send the data back to Italy because they did not want Ferrari to take advantage of their own data, which had been mixed in with Ferrari's.

=== 2005–2006: Rise, success, decline and customer engine partnership expansion ===
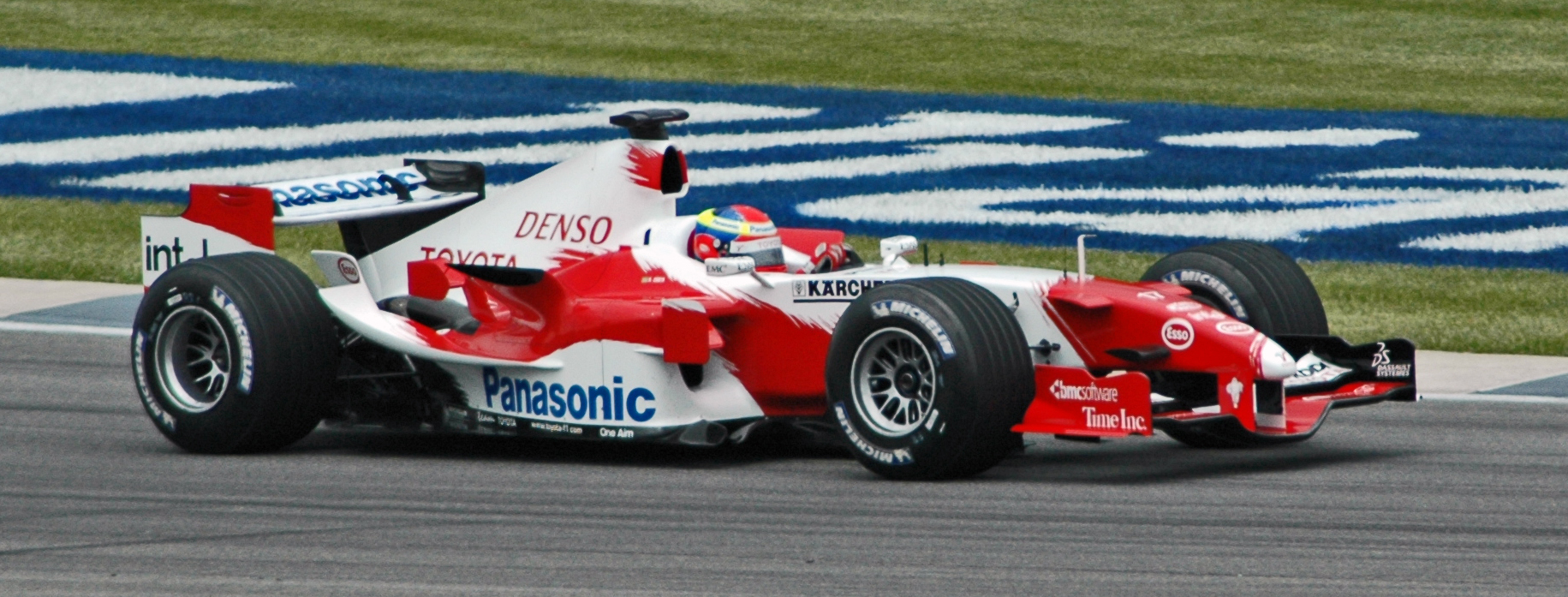
Ricardo Zonta, replacing the injured Ralf Schumacher, qualifying in the Toyota TF105 at the 2005 United States Grand Prix.

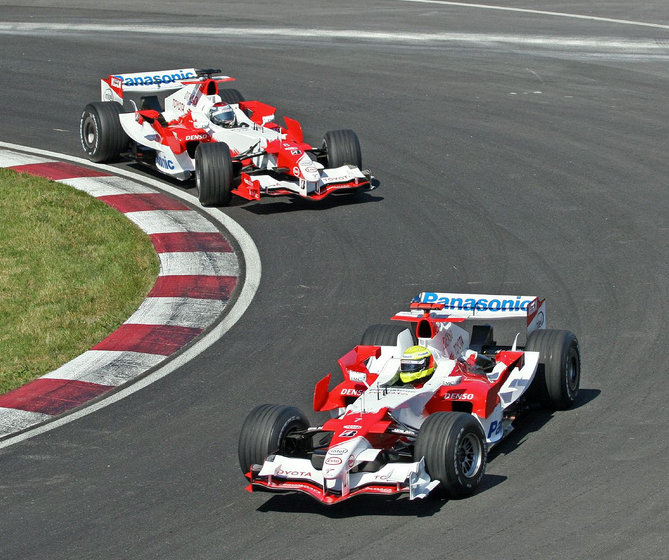
Ralf Schumacher leading Jarno Trulli at the 2006 Canadian Grand Prix, where Trulli finished in 4th place.

==== 2005 ====
2005 saw an improvement in Toyota's fortunes. The team retained Trulli for the season but replaced Zonta with race-winner Ralf Schumacher from Williams. During the team's launch for their 2005 car, the TF105, Schumacher said that he had a better chance of winning the title at Toyota than he ever did at Williams. The team also supplied leased customer engines to the Jordan team. Toyota made a good start to the season, with Jarno Trulli qualifying second at the opening round in Australia and finishing second at the following two races in Malaysia and Bahrain. Results petered away slightly from this point, with Trulli scoring his only other podium with 3rd place at Spain and Ralf Schumacher rewarding the squad with 3rd place at both Hungary and China and a pole position at the Japanese Grand Prix. Nevertheless, the 2005 season was Toyota's most successful Formula One season by far, as they scored points in all but the opening race and the controversial United States Grand Prix, where Trulli qualified in pole position, but like all the drivers using Michelin tyres, retired before the start of the race.

==== 2006 ====
Toyota retained the same driver line-up for 2006, although it switched to Bridgestone tyres. The team was the first to unveil their new car, a move intended to give them an advantage over their rivals, but the car's performance in testing was average. Ralf Schumacher's third place in Australia was Toyota's only podium finish during 2006. Their highest race finishes thereafter were 4th at France with Schumacher and also at the Brickyard, where Trulli started from the back and fought his way through to beat champion Fernando Alonso's Renault. Trulli came close to another podium in Monaco, but his engine failed during the late stages of the race. Ralf finished 6th at the Hungarian GP, as the only other significant result for the team. Jarno Trulli suffered a slight problem, and was off the pace during the team's home race (the Japanese Grand Prix) which delayed team-mate Ralf Schumacher on course for a strong result. In the final race – the Brazilian Grand Prix – both of Toyota's cars retired in the early laps with suspension failures. Despite these setbacks, the team enjoyed the second-best season performance in their history, scoring 35 points and finishing in sixth place, one point behind BMW Sauber.

Toyota surprised the Formula One community by dropping Mike Gascoyne from their technical department after the Melbourne race, especially as the Englishman had contributed to their rise in competitiveness during 2005. However, the poor performances of the TF106 in the opening two races of the season, particularly in Bahrain where the team had finished on the podium 12 months earlier, prompted disagreement over the team's technical direction. Gascoyne disliked the corporate way the team's management operated while team management were unimpressed by the TF106 car Gascoyne had produced and he was duly dismissed. It took a while for Toyota to replace the technical director, eventually promoting Pascal Vasselon to the role, saying that a technical department run by one man alone was becoming old fashioned.

=== 2007–2009: association with Williams and final seasons ===
==== 2007 ====
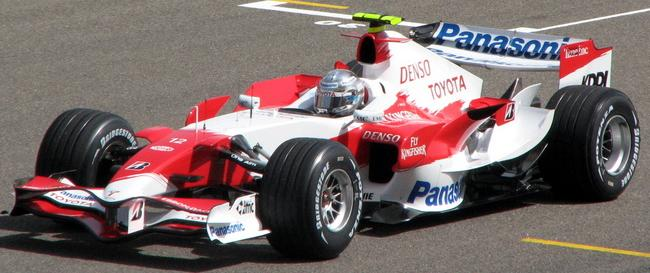
Jarno Trulli driving the Toyota TF107 at the 2007 Bahrain Grand Prix. He finished the race in 7th place after qualifying 9th.

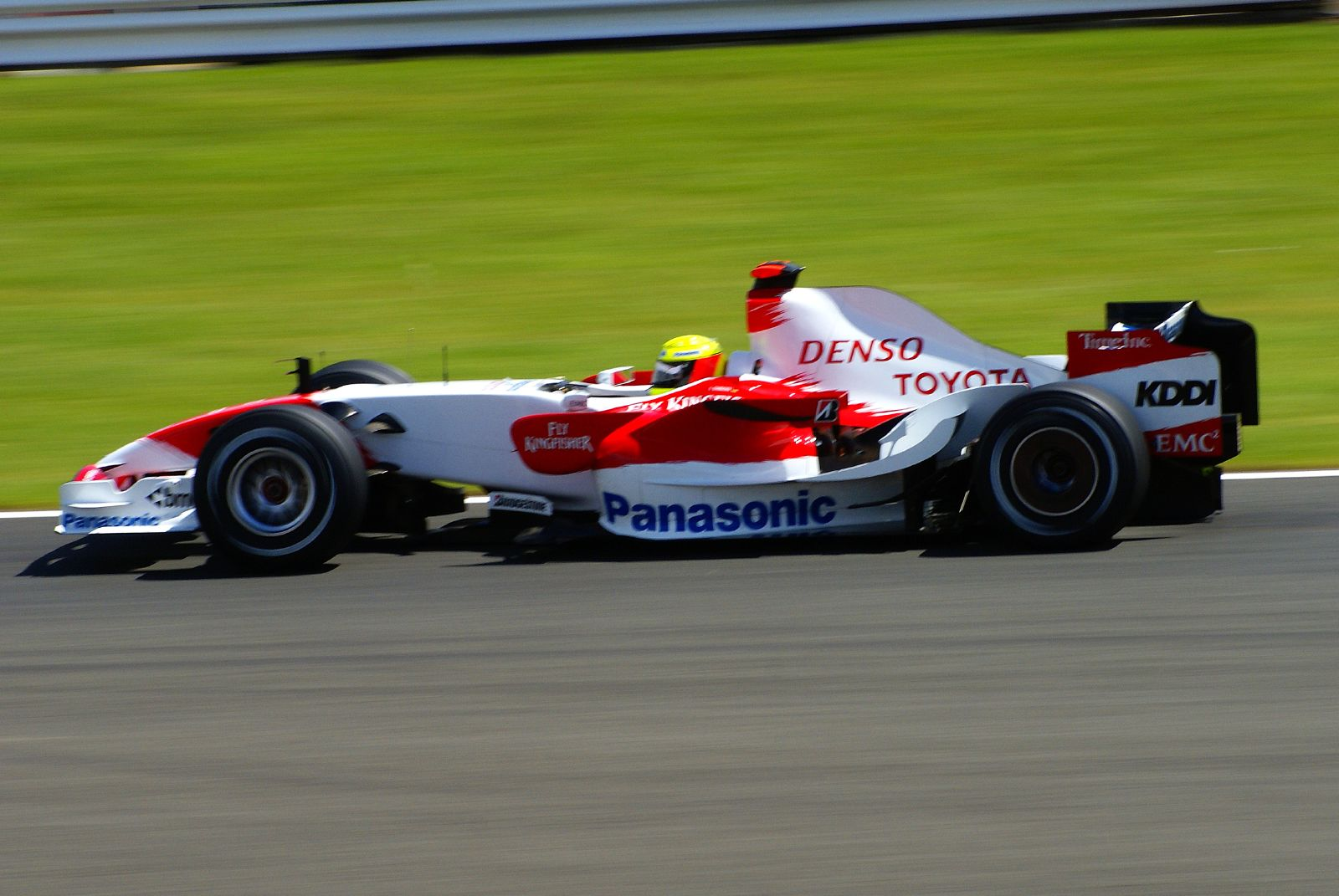
Ralf Schumacher at the 2007 British Grand Prix.

Trulli and Schumacher were retained by Toyota for 2007. The Toyota TF107 was officially launched on 12 January 2007 in Cologne, Germany. Toyota began their winter testing programme in Valencia on 29 January 2007. Toyota enjoyed a competitive start to the pre-season testing at the Valencia circuit. Toyota's supply of customer engines was moved from the Midland F1 team to British former constructors' champions Williams who had, by their own standards, underperformed with Cosworth engines during 2006.

Ralf Schumacher scored Toyota's first point of the season with 8th place in the year's opening Grand Prix in Melbourne. Jarno Trulli scored two points in each of the next two races, finishing 7th at both Malaysia and Bahrain. Schumacher struggled in those races, finishing no higher than 12th. During the four-week break that followed the third round, Toyota tested at the Circuit de Catalunya, where the team stated improvements were made. Team president John Howett said Toyota were looking to close down on third-placed team BMW Sauber in the constructors' standings, having maintained 5th since Malaysia. However, the team failed to score any points over the next two races.

The Canadian Grand Prix ended their points drought. Ralf Schumacher scored a point for finishing 8th, and at the following event at Indianapolis, Trulli finished in 6th place. Schumacher meanwhile, was involved in a crash with David Coulthard and Rubens Barrichello at the opening corner.

A run of incidents meant the team did not score points until the Hungarian Grand Prix. Here Schumacher scored 3 points after he qualified in 5th place and finished 6th.

On 1 October, Schumacher announced that he would be leaving Toyota at the end of the 2007 season for a new challenge, having not been offered a new contract.

Toyota ended the year with an 8th-place finish at Interlagos for Jarno Trulli. Altogether, 13 points were scored, the team's lowest tally since 2004 and less than they achieved in their second season. The team admitted not fulfilling their pre-season promises, and vowed to have a completely different car for 2008.

==== 2008 ====
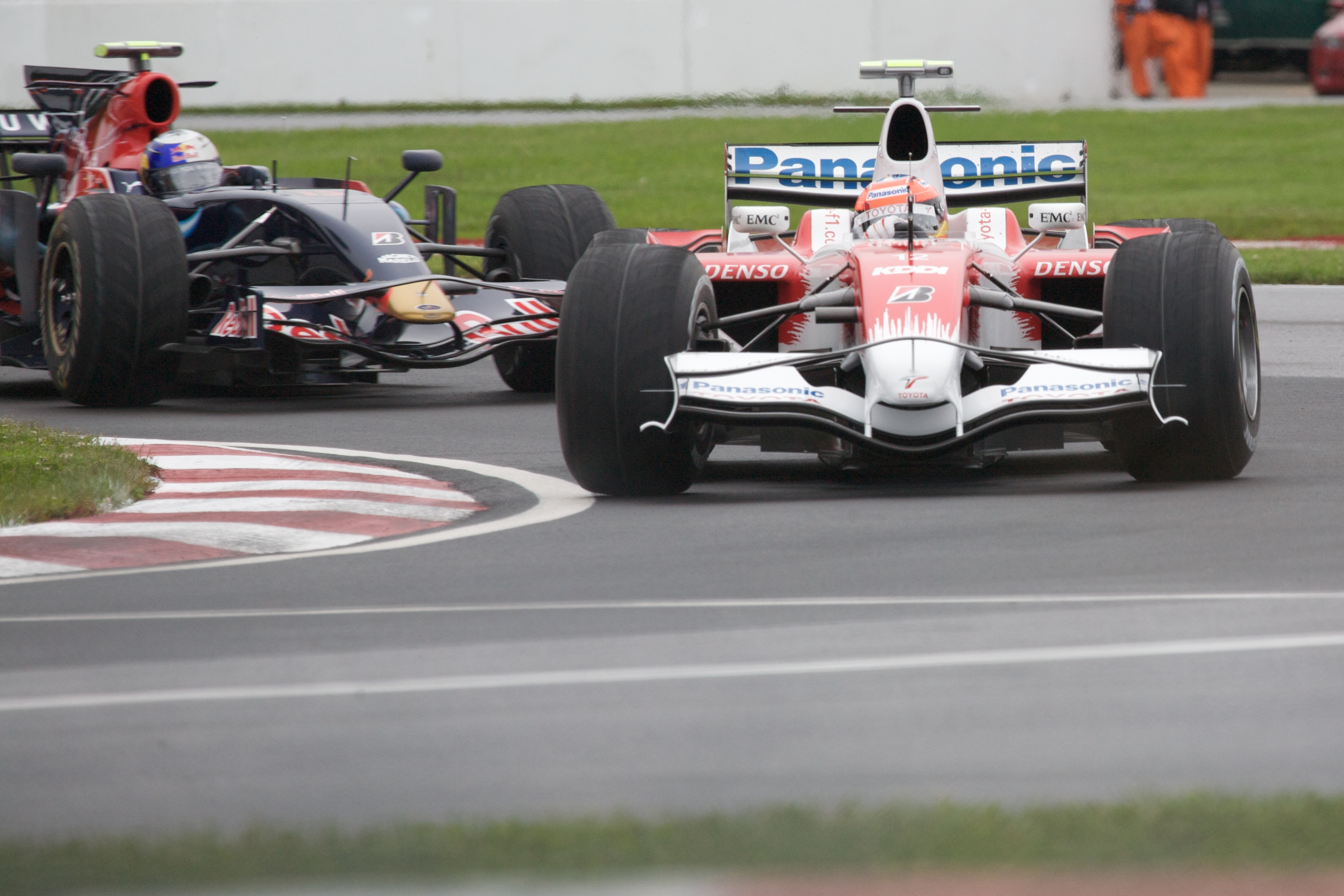
Timo Glock at the 2008 Canadian Grand Prix

While retaining Jarno Trulli, Toyota replaced Ralf Schumacher with reigning GP2 champion Timo Glock for the 2008 season. The team's new car, the Toyota TF108, was launched on 10 January 2008. The team's first points came in Sepang, where Jarno Trulli qualified in 5th place (albeit being promoted to 3rd following the McLaren team being penalised) and went on to finish the race in 4th. This proved not to be a one off, with Trulli getting 6th place next time out in Bahrain, and then 8th in Spain after some late-race trouble. After retiring in the opening two rounds followed by mid-field finishes, Timo Glock was able to secure a 4th place and 5 points for Toyota at Montreal, in addition to Trulli's 3 points brought Toyota up 5th place in the Constructor's standings. Each car led the race at some point. More points were to follow at France, where Trulli managed to hold off Heikki Kovalainen in the late race stages to collect 3rd place. This was Toyota's first podium finish in over two years. Trulli dedicated this podium to former team boss Ove Andersson, who died in the week prior to the race, in a car accident. Trulli scored points in the British Grand Prix, but despite a solid showing during most of the race in Germany, neither driver scored points; Glock suffered a rear suspension failure that caused a spectacular crash, while Trulli was passed in the later stages of the race. The team's fortunes looked up in Hungary, where Glock put in a good qualifying run that ultimately led to a second-place finish in the race, giving him his first F1 podium and Toyota's second podium finish of the season. At the next race in Valencia, Jarno Trulli was able to gather a 5th-place finish while teammate Glock fought his way up to 7th. This result put Toyota ten points ahead of Renault in the constructors' standings.

At the next race in Belgium Trulli struggled, only being able to finish 16th, as his gearbox was damaged in a collision with Sébastien Bourdais' Toro Rosso on the first lap. Timo Glock, on the other hand, was doing as badly as Trulli until a few laps before the end of the race the rain came down. Glock changed to wet tyres, and was able to move up the order to 8th place. After the race, however, Glock was penalised 25-seconds for overtaking Mark Webber under yellow flags during the final lap of the race. The penalty pushed Glock to ninth place.

The next race took the team to Italy where they qualified well – Trulli 7th and Glock 9th. However, they were only able to manage 11th and 13th respectively in the race.

In Singapore Toyota again qualified well, Glock 8th and Trulli 11th. Trulli retired from the race with transmission problems, but Glock went on to finish 4th.

At the Japanese Grand Prix Glock retired on lap 7 with a mechanical failure, after hitting debris from David Coulthard's crash. However, Jarno Trulli did very well, finishing 5th.

In the 2008 Chinese Grand Prix Trulli was again involved in an incident with Sébastien Bourdais on lap 1, this time forcing him out of the race. Glock meanwhile maintained his strong late-season form, scoring two points for 7th place.

Meanwhile, in the dramatic 2008 Brazilian Grand Prix the Toyotas were the only cars to stay out on dry tyres in the torrential rainstorm in the closing stages of the race, and that had a significant factor on deciding the destiny of the world title. Trulli had qualified 2nd, but both he and Glock faded to 6th and 8th respectively at the finish, Glock relinquishing the vital fifth place to Lewis Hamilton on the final lap, which was enough for the McLaren driver to seal the world title by a point from local hero and race winner Felipe Massa. Afterwards, Glock denied conspiracy claims that he gave the place to Hamilton, citing that he was struggling for grip on the wet track surface and that there was absolutely nothing he could do.

Toyota finished 2008 with 56 points, a vast improvement on their 2007 total of 13. The team finished the year ranked 5th, improving from their 2007 standing of 6th.

==== 2009 ====
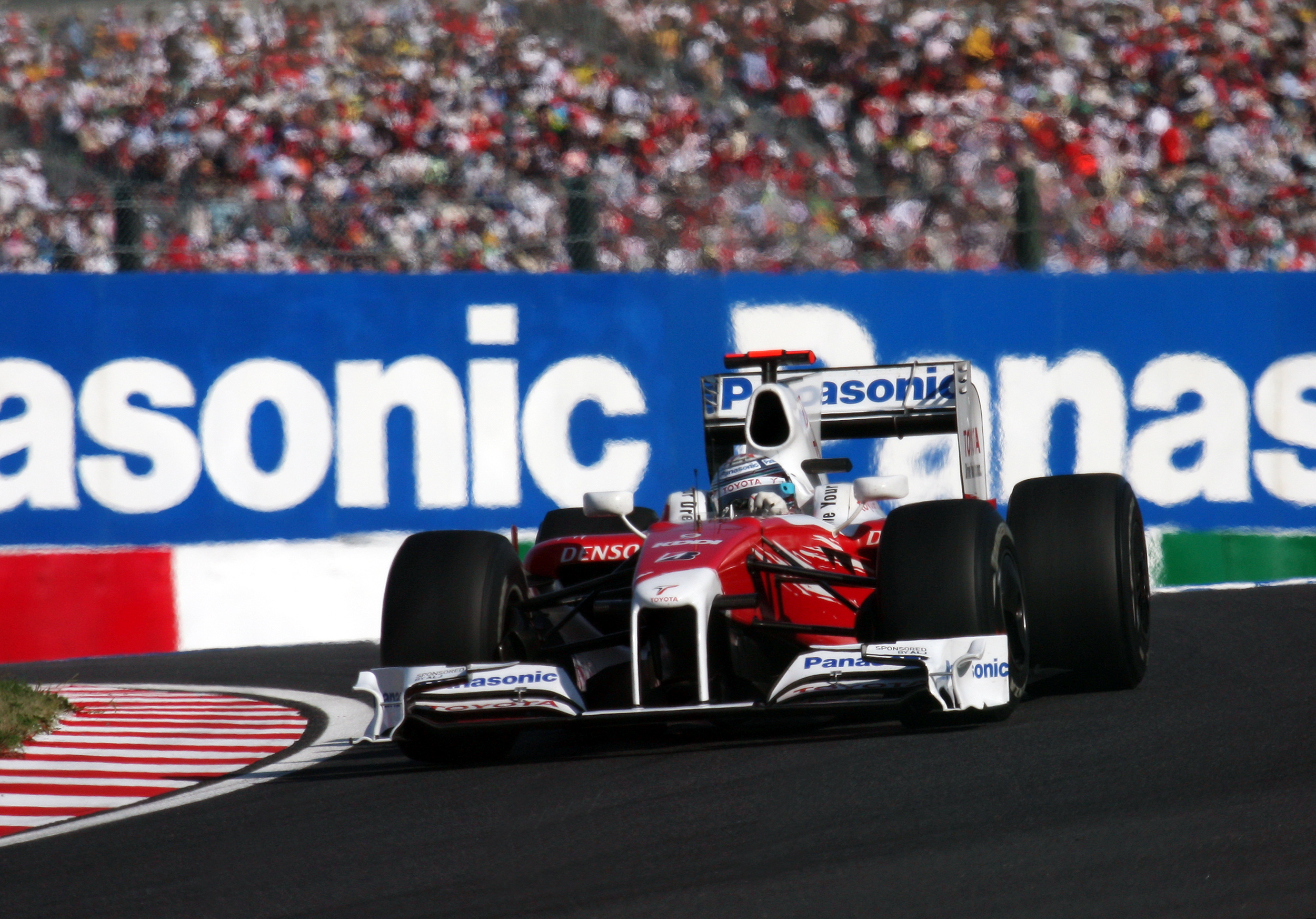
Trulli driving for Toyota at the 2009 Japanese Grand Prix, where he scored the team's thirteenth and final podium finish.

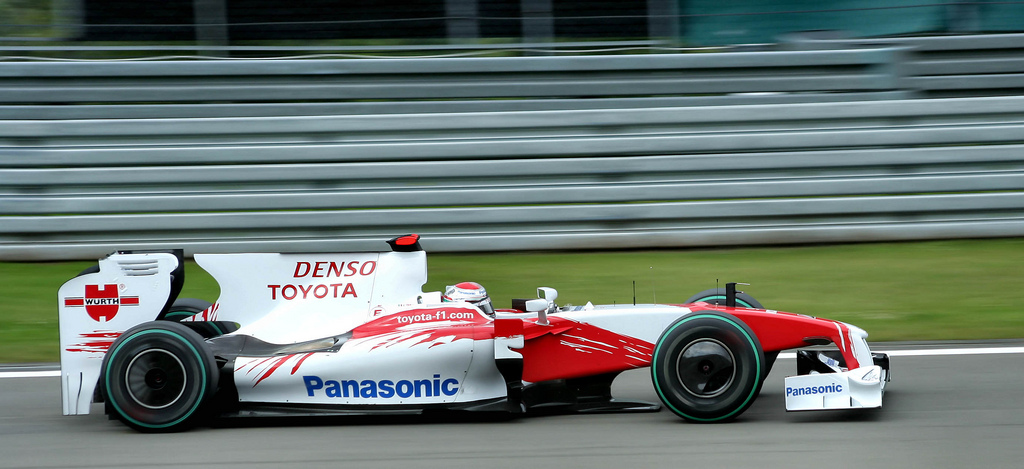
Trulli at the 2009 German Grand Prix

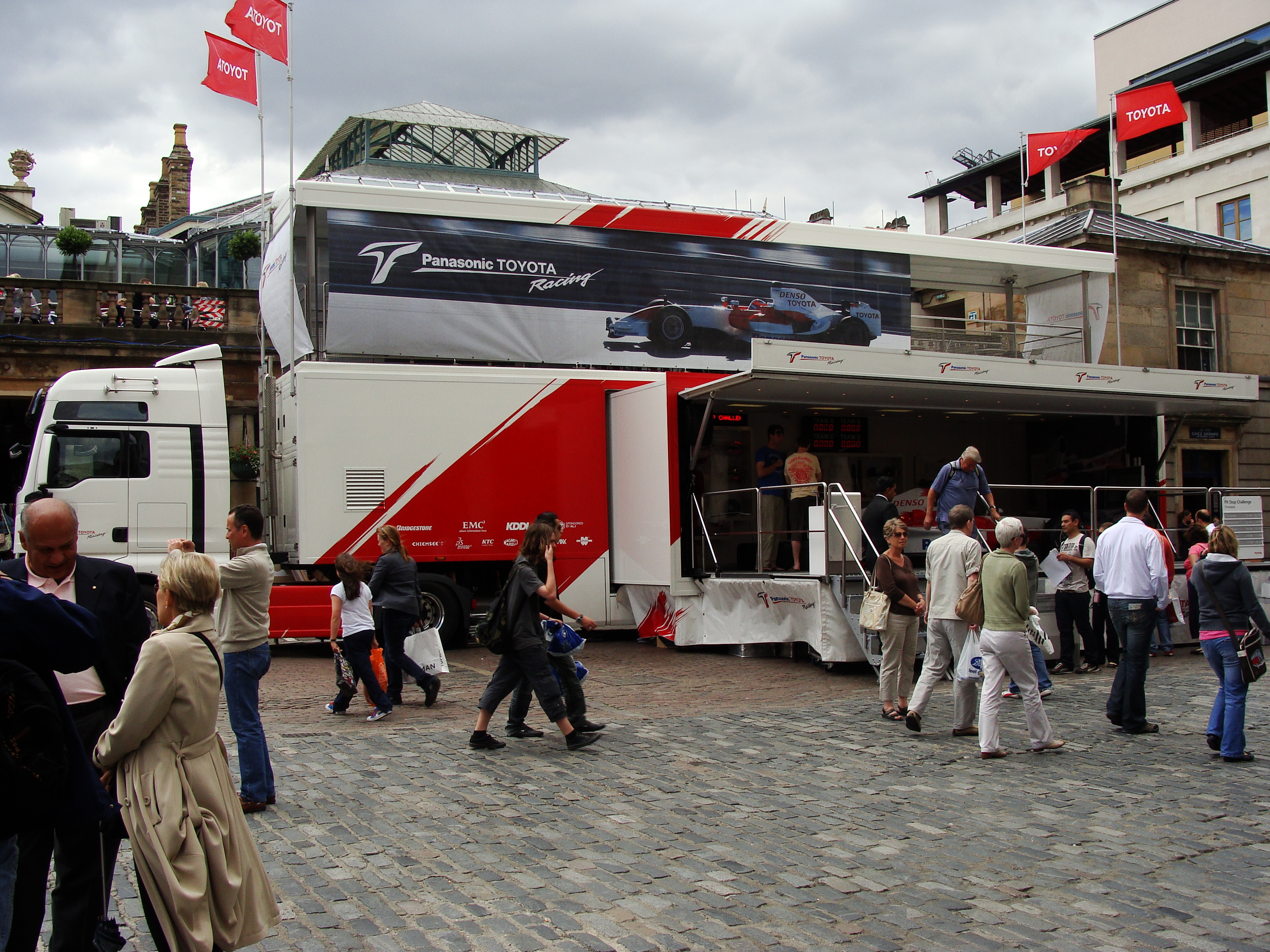
Toyota F1 Transporter

Toyota retained both Glock and Trulli for 2009 and introduced a new car, the TF109. The team began the season extremely well, scoring seven times in the first four races (including three podiums), along with a pole position in Bahrain. This early form was partly due to a loophole in the new technical regulations, as Toyota was one of only three teams to begin the season with a "double diffuser" design. However, the team's form dropped off during the European leg of the season before returning for the final flyaway races. In the next nine races Toyota only managed five points finishes, with no podiums, and they were overtaken in the constructors' championship by both Ferrari and McLaren. A resurgence towards the end of the season saw Toyota claim another two podiums (in Singapore and Japan) and secure fifth place in the constructors' title, albeit without the targeted first victory. Glock was injured in a crash during qualifying for the Japanese Grand Prix, and was replaced for the final two races of the season by the team's test and reserve driver, Kamui Kobayashi.

In light of the parent company's first ever financial loss in 2009, Toyota decided to withdraw from Formula One with immediate effect on 4 November 2009.

Toyota's 2010 car the TF110 was almost fully developed. There were two prepared prototype chassis of the TF110.

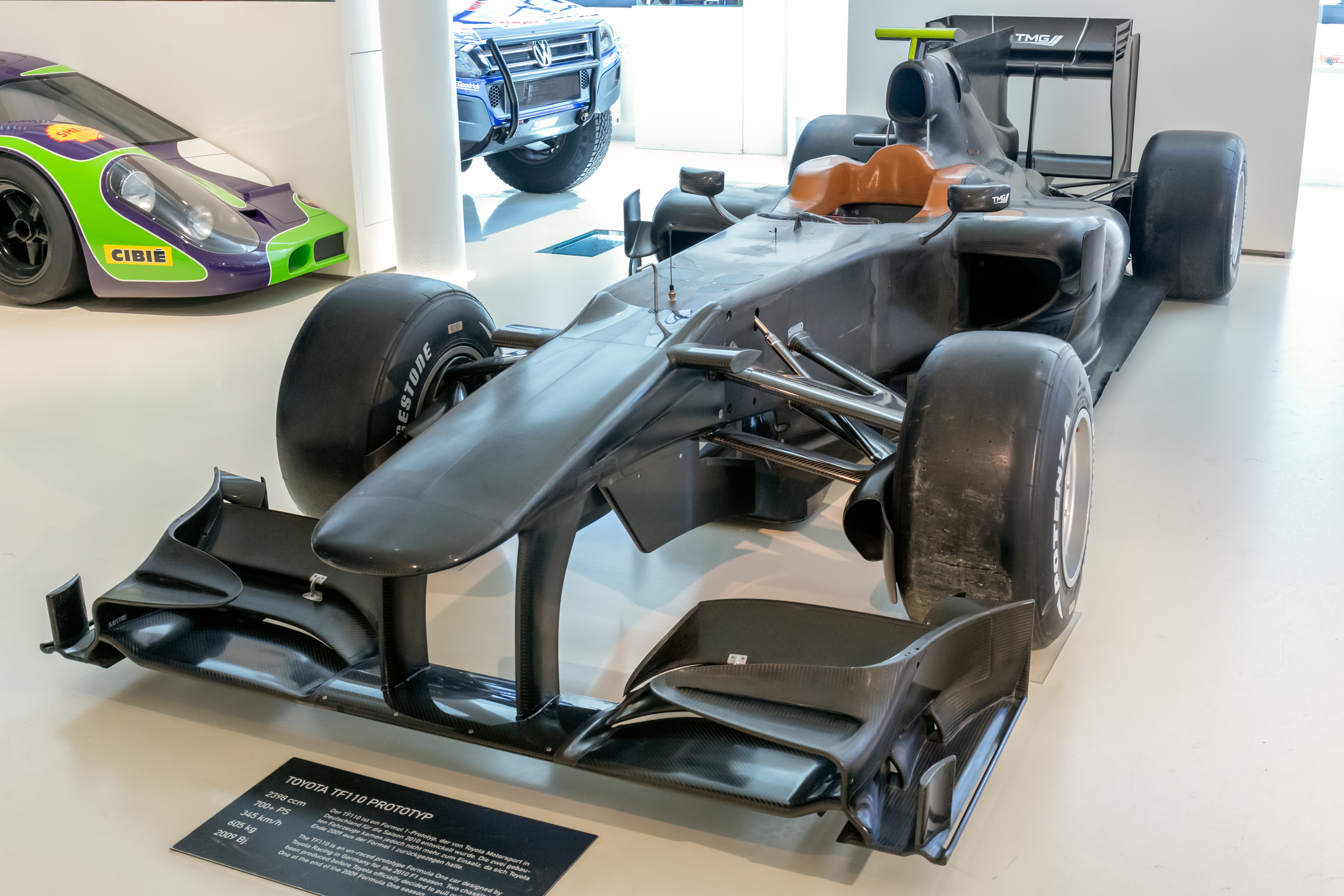
2010 Toyota TF110-02 chassis on display in the Prototyp museum in Hamburg, Germany in 2019

An agreement was reached for the Stefan Grand Prix team, which was attempting to compete in the 2010 season to take Toyota's 2010 chassis and engines in 2010. Stefan Grand Prix also rented private office space at Toyota Motorsport GmbH, but the team was refused an entry and never competed in Formula One. The struggling HRT team tried to purchase the chassis to replace their poor performing Dallara chassis. The deal was never completed. Tyre supplier Pirelli expressed an interest in using the Toyotas as development sleds for its F1 tyres ahead of their return to the sport in 2011, but instead opted to use the race-proven T109. The first chassis TF110-01 was painted red for Stefan GP and was run in a shakedown by Kazuki Nakajima in the Toyota Motorsports headquarters car park. The same chassis was also run by Toyota F1 boss John Howett, but he reportedly crashed the car into a factory wall during a run arranged to mark his leaving of the company. The second chassis TF110-02 remained in an unpainted carbon-look, and is currently on display at Automuseum PROTOTYP in Hamburg, Germany. To this day many speculate how Toyota would have performed in 2010. Many in the industry think that race wins could have been achieved with the TF110, which featured very advanced aerodynamics.

Toyota's grid spot in 2010 was taken by Sauber who competed under the name BMW Sauber despite BMW's withdrawal from the sport and the team reverting to Ferrari engines.

== Engine supplier ==
Jordan used Toyota engines in 2005 and when the team was re-badged as Midland F1 in 2006, Toyota continued to supply the team with engines. Williams also used Toyota engines from 2007 to 2009.

== Haas F1 Team partnership ==
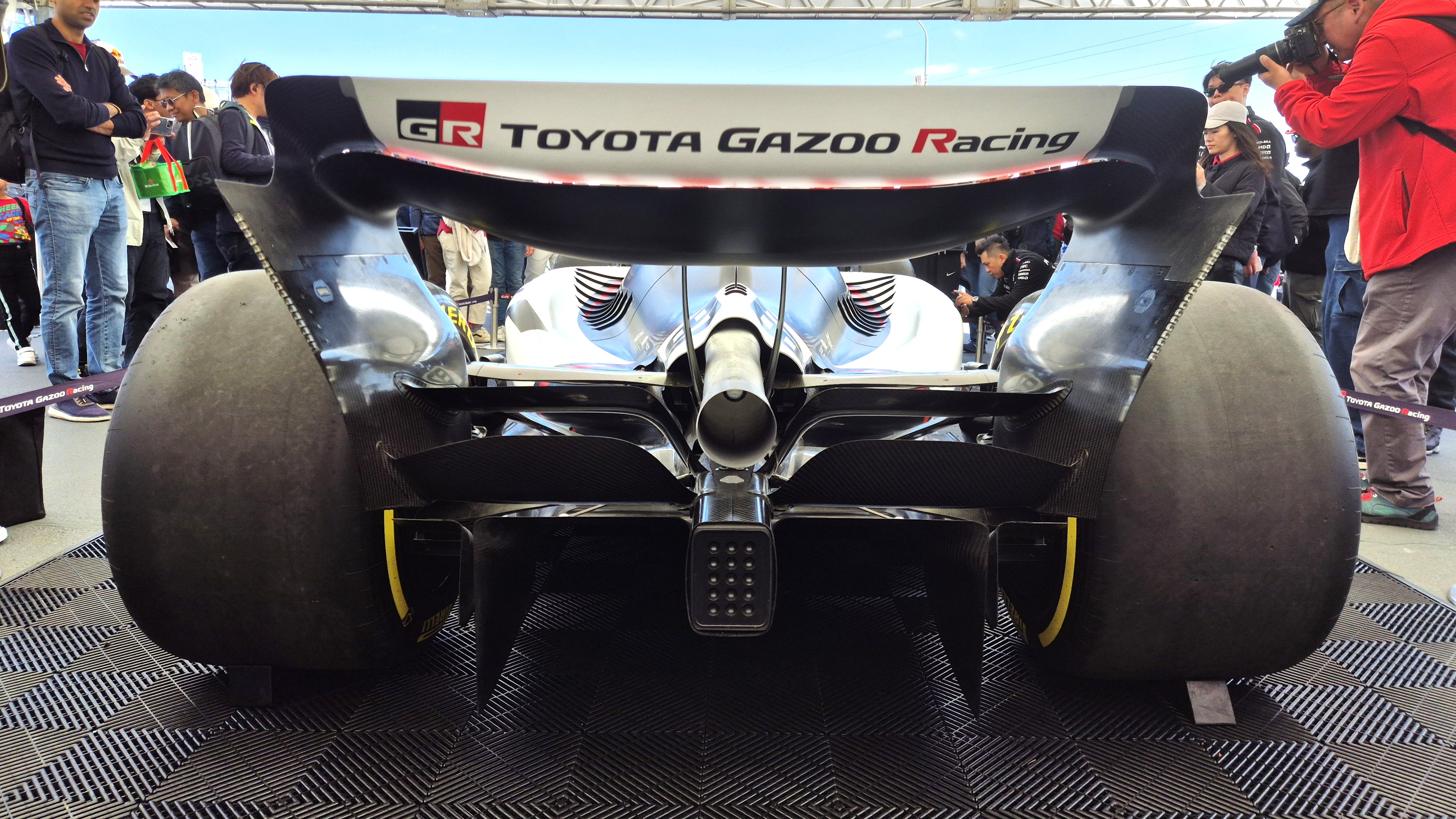
TGR logo on Haas VF-25 rear wing

On 11 October 2024, Haas F1 Team announced a technical partnership with Toyota that sees the team receive design, technical and manufacturing services from Toyota Gazoo Racing, while Ferrari would continue to provide power units and other components until 2028. During the announcement, Toyota chairman Akio Toyoda emphasised that the deal does not signify Toyota's full-fledged return to the sport. Instead, the company highlighted that the deal would provide an opportunity for its engineers, staff and drivers to experience Formula One. A few months later in January 2025, TGR director of global motorsport Masaya Kaji said that Toyota is looking into returning into Formula One. In December 2025, Haas and Toyota announced a title sponsorship, with Haas entering the 2026 season as TGR Haas F1 Team.

== Sponsorship ==
Panasonic was Toyota's title sponsor since the team's first season in 2002. After Toyota's upturn in form from 2005, Panasonic extended its sponsorship deal. Denso (a member of Toyota Group) and Esso (a member of ExxonMobil group) were also with Toyota F1 since that first year.

== Notable drivers ==
Based on a racer's credentials, Olivier Panis could be classed as Toyota F1's first notable driver, being their first man with a Grand Prix win to his name. However, that win was in unusual circumstances, when many of the front-runners (drivers for teams like Williams, Ferrari and Benetton) dropped out in the wet, tricky conditions. Otherwise, Panis had never driven for front-running teams, and joined Toyota in 2003 after a season with BAR that yielded just 4 points. Therefore, the following are racers of calibre who have shone for Toyota, and who have had reasonable success in F1 generally.

=== Ralf Schumacher ===
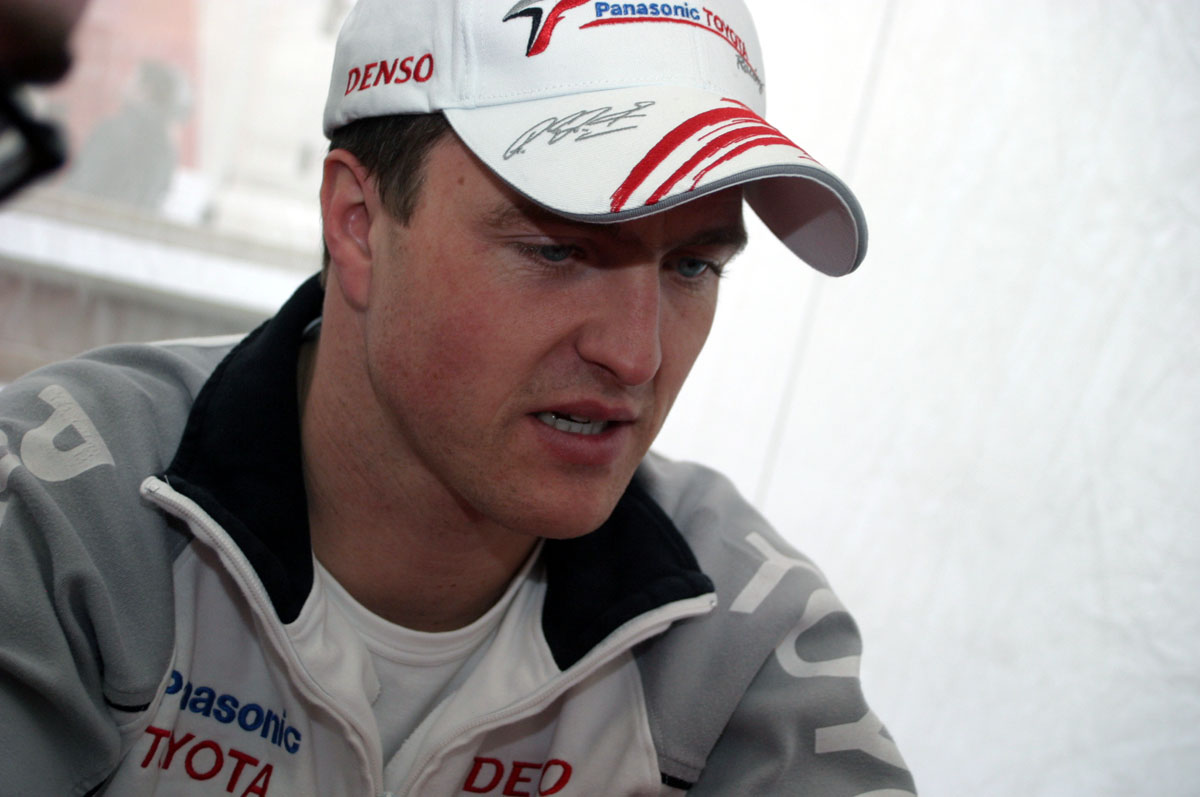
Schumacher in 2006

The German driver came to Toyota in 2005 from Williams with 6 Grand Prix wins to his name. After a 2004 season with the Grove-based team that yielded just one top-three race finish, a need for change was felt and Schumacher joined Toyota. The Japanese team had yet to score a podium finish. However he settled in comfortably.

Schumacher appeared slower than Trulli in the first few races of the 2005 season, as the latter hit the headlines as he took Toyota to new heights. But Schumacher caught up, and ended the season on top, getting two podiums, the first of which was chasing his brother Michael for 2nd place in the Hungarian race.

He struggled throughout 2006 after saying he expected Toyota to score its first win, and once again, his best result was just 3rd. Schumacher split with long term manager Willi Weber during this season, and partnered with Hans Mahr, who tried to get Schumacher back into a winning team – a move that did not work.

However Schumacher wanted to prove he was still content with being at Toyota F1 through the following close season, and said he was more likely to still win the F1 title with Toyota than any other team, and that Toyota would be the team of the future. On 1 October, Schumacher announced that he would be leaving Toyota at the end of the 2007 season for a new challenge, but did not clearly state what this challenge would be.

=== Jarno Trulli ===
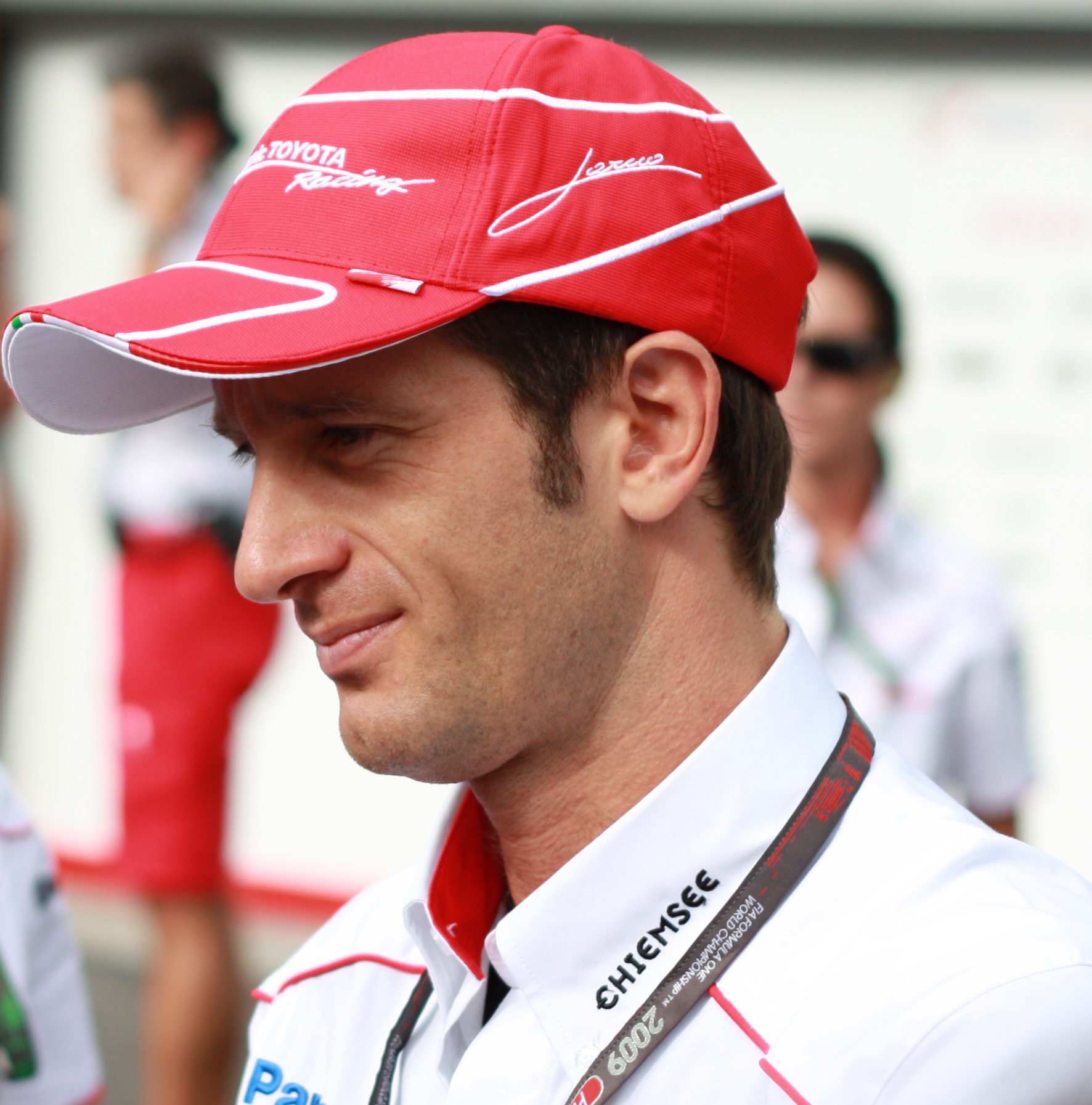
Trulli in 2009

Being Toyota's first recruitment of a top driver and Grand Prix winner, Jarno Trulli's move from Renault was big news. It was late during the 2004 season, and Trulli was dropped from Renault's race line-up despite matching his team-mate Fernando Alonso, and replaced by Jacques Villeneuve. Soon after, Toyota F1 revealed that Trulli would race for them during the 2005 season and beyond. However, Olivier Panis retired from racing before the year was out, leaving a space in Toyota's race attack, meaning Trulli was promoted earlier than anticipated. Qualifying 6th on his Toyota debut in Japan was the start of a competitive run for the team. No points were scored that year, although Trulli comfortably outpaced his team-mate Ricardo Zonta.

Trulli settled in well with Toyota, finding it easier to focus when not on tenterhooks with the Team Principal as he was with Renault's Flavio Briatore. As such, the first spark of form that that aspect was yielding was when Trulli qualified 2nd at Melbourne – Toyota's first front row start. He dropped off in the race with tyre trouble, but then went on to score Toyota's first podiums in Malaysia and Bahrain.

However, a term was created in that year – the "Trulli Train". This highlighted a recurring snag to Trulli's career. It referred to when Trulli qualified in a high position, but dropped away in the races (mainly due to tyre degradation in 2005). The result was the buildup of a queue behind Trulli's car, which was present at numerous races throughout 2005, albeit not in his podium-scoring performances. Team-mate Schumacher tended not to suffer from these problems as much, partly because he often did not qualify as far up the grid as Trulli. He trailed off towards the end of the 2005 season, ending the year behind Ralf Schumacher.

Mechanical failure was a factor with the Italian's 2006 campaign, with the loss of podium finishes occurring all too often. It took Trulli until round 9 to score points, but he did so with 6th place after qualifying 4th. More great results followed, with his run from 22nd to 4th at Indianapolis standing out. However, it was a year with a notable lack of points scored, and did nothing for Trulli's reputation, allowing his critics to claw back at him.

The 2007 season was the first in which, when paired together at the Japanese team, Trulli outscored Ralf Schumacher overall. While Schumacher left the team, Trulli's new team-mate was the reigning GP2 Champion Timo Glock.

Trulli began the 2009 season with a 3rd place at the Australian Grand Prix. Teammate Glock finished 5th but ended up placing 4th due to Lewis Hamilton being disqualified.

== Complete Formula One results ==
=== As a chassis constructor ===
(key)

| Year | Chassis | Engine | Tyres | Drivers | 1 | 2 | 3 | 4 | 5 | 6 | 7 | 8 | 9 | 10 | 11 | 12 | 13 | 14 | 15 | 16 | 17 | 18 | 19 | Points | WCC |
|---|---|---|---|---|---|---|---|---|---|---|---|---|---|---|---|---|---|---|---|---|---|---|---|---|---|
| 2002 | TF102 | RVX-02 3.0 V10 | M | | AUS | MAL | BRA | SMR | ESP | AUT | MON | CAN | EUR | GBR | FRA | GER | HUN | BEL | ITA | USA | JPN | | | 2 | 10th |
| 2002 | TF102 | RVX-02 3.0 V10 | M | (Finland) Mika Salo | 6 | 12 | 6 | Ret | 9 | 8 | Ret | Ret | Ret | Ret | Ret | 9 | 15 | 7 | 11 | 14 | 8 | | | 2 | 10th |
| 2002 | TF102 | RVX-02 3.0 V10 | M | (United Kingdom) Allan McNish | Ret | 7 | Ret | Ret | 8 | 9 | Ret | Ret | 14 | Ret | 11^{†} | Ret | 14 | 9 | Ret | 15 | DNS | | | 2 | 10th |
| 2003 | TF103 | RVX-03 3.0 V10 | M | | AUS | MAL | BRA | SMR | ESP | AUT | MON | CAN | EUR | FRA | GBR | GER | HUN | ITA | USA | JPN | | | | 16 | 8th |
| 2003 | TF103 | RVX-03 3.0 V10 | M | (France) Olivier Panis | Ret | Ret | Ret | 9 | Ret | Ret | 13 | 8 | Ret | 8 | 11 | 5 | Ret | Ret | Ret | 10 | | | | 16 | 8th |
| 2003 | TF103 | RVX-03 3.0 V10 | M | (Brazil) Cristiano da Matta | Ret | 11 | 10 | 12 | 6 | 10 | 9 | 11^{†} | Ret | 11 | 7 | 6 | 11 | Ret | 9 | 7 | | | | 16 | 8th |
| 2004 | TF104; TF104B | RVX-04 3.0 V10 | M | | AUS | MAL | BHR | SMR | ESP | MON | EUR | CAN | USA | FRA | GBR | GER | HUN | BEL | ITA | CHN | JPN | BRA | | 9 | 8th |
| 2004 | TF104; TF104B | RVX-04 3.0 V10 | M | (Brazil) Cristiano da Matta | 12 | 9 | 10 | Ret | 13 | 6 | Ret | DSQ | Ret | 14 | 13 | Ret | | | | | | | | 9 | 8th |
| 2004 | TF104; TF104B | RVX-04 3.0 V10 | M | (Brazil) Ricardo Zonta | | | | | | | | | | | | | Ret | 10^{†} | 11 | Ret | | 13 | | 9 | 8th |
| 2004 | TF104; TF104B | RVX-04 3.0 V10 | M | (Italy) Jarno Trulli | | | | | | | | | | | | | | | | | 11 | 12 | | 9 | 8th |
| 2004 | TF104; TF104B | RVX-04 3.0 V10 | M | (France) Olivier Panis | 13 | 12 | 9 | 11 | Ret | 8 | 11 | DSQ | 5 | 15 | Ret | 14 | 11 | 8 | Ret | 14 | 14 | | | 9 | 8th |
| 2005 | TF105; TF105B | RVX-05 3.0 V10 | M | | AUS | MAL | BHR | SMR | ESP | MON | EUR | CAN | USA | FRA | GBR | GER | HUN | TUR | ITA | BEL | BRA | JPN | CHN | 88 | 4th |
| 2005 | TF105; TF105B | RVX-05 3.0 V10 | M | (Italy) Jarno Trulli | 9 | 2 | 2 | 5 | 3 | 10 | 8 | Ret | DNS^{P} | 5 | 9 | 14^{†} | 4 | 6 | 5 | Ret | 13^{†} | Ret | 15 | 88 | 4th |
| 2005 | TF105; TF105B | RVX-05 3.0 V10 | M | (Germany) Ralf Schumacher | 12 | 5 | 4 | 9 | 4 | 6 | Ret | 6 | WD | 7 | 8 | 6 | 3 | 12 | 6 | 7^{F} | 8 | 8^{P} | 3 | 88 | 4th |
| 2005 | TF105; TF105B | RVX-05 3.0 V10 | M | (Brazil) Ricardo Zonta | | | | | | | | | DNS | | | | | | | | | | | 88 | 4th |
| 2006 | TF106; TF106B | RVX-06 2.4 V8 | B | | BHR | MAL | AUS | SMR | EUR | ESP | MON | GBR | CAN | USA | FRA | GER | HUN | TUR | ITA | CHN | JPN | BRA | | 35 | 6th |
| 2006 | TF106; TF106B | RVX-06 2.4 V8 | B | (Germany) Ralf Schumacher | 14 | 8 | 3 | 9 | Ret | Ret | 8 | Ret | Ret | Ret | 4 | 9 | 6 | 7 | 15 | Ret | 7 | Ret | | 35 | 6th |
| 2006 | TF106; TF106B | RVX-06 2.4 V8 | B | (Italy) Jarno Trulli | 16 | 9 | Ret | Ret | 9 | 10 | 17^{†} | 11 | 6 | 4 | Ret | 7 | 12^{†} | 9 | 7 | Ret | 6 | Ret | | 35 | 6th |
| 2007 | TF107 | RVX-07 2.4 V8 | B | | AUS | MAL | BHR | ESP | MON | CAN | USA | FRA | GBR | EUR | HUN | TUR | ITA | BEL | JPN | CHN | BRA | | | 13 | 6th |
| 2007 | TF107 | RVX-07 2.4 V8 | B | (Germany) Ralf Schumacher | 8 | 15 | 12 | Ret | 16 | 8 | Ret | 10 | Ret | Ret | 6 | 12 | 15 | 10 | Ret | Ret | 11 | | | 13 | 6th |
| 2007 | TF107 | RVX-07 2.4 V8 | B | (Italy) Jarno Trulli | 9 | 7 | 7 | Ret | 15 | Ret | 6 | Ret | Ret | 13 | 10 | 16 | 11 | 11 | 13 | 13 | 8 | | | 13 | 6th |
| 2008 | TF108 | RVX-08 2.4 V8 | B | | AUS | MAL | BHR | ESP | TUR | MON | CAN | FRA | GBR | GER | HUN | EUR | BEL | ITA | SIN | JPN | CHN | BRA | | 56 | 5th |
| 2008 | TF108 | RVX-08 2.4 V8 | B | (Italy) Jarno Trulli | Ret | 4 | 6 | 8 | 10 | 13 | 6 | 3 | 7 | 9 | 7 | 5 | 16 | 13 | Ret | 5 | Ret | 8 | | 56 | 5th |
| 2008 | TF108 | RVX-08 2.4 V8 | B | (Germany) Timo Glock | Ret | Ret | 9 | 11 | 13 | 12 | 4 | 11 | 12 | Ret | 2 | 7 | 9 | 11 | 4 | Ret | 7 | 6 | | 56 | 5th |
| 2009 | TF109 | RVX-09 2.4 V8 | B | | AUS | MAL | CHN | BHR | ESP | MON | TUR | GBR | GER | HUN | EUR | BEL | ITA | SIN | JPN | BRA | ABU | | | 59.5 | 5th |
| 2009 | TF109 | RVX-09 2.4 V8 | B | (Italy) Jarno Trulli | 3 | 4^{‡} | Ret | 3^{P}^{F} | Ret | 13 | 4 | 7 | 17 | 8 | 13 | Ret | 14 | 12 | 2 | Ret | 7 | | | 59.5 | 5th |
| 2009 | TF109 | RVX-09 2.4 V8 | B | (Germany) Timo Glock | 4 | 3^{‡} | 7 | 7 | 10 | 10 | 8 | 9 | 9 | 6 | 14^{F} | 10 | 11 | 2 | DNS | | | | | 59.5 | 5th |
| 2009 | TF109 | RVX-09 2.4 V8 | B | (Japan) Kamui Kobayashi | | | | | | | | | | | | | | | | 9 | 6 | | | 59.5 | 5th |

‡ Half points awarded as less than 75% of race distance was completed.

=== As an engine supplier ===
(key)

| Year | Team | Chassis | Engine | Tyres | Drivers | 1 | 2 | 3 | 4 | 5 | 6 | 7 | 8 | 9 | 10 | 11 | 12 | 13 | 14 | 15 | 16 | 17 | 18 | 19 | Points | WCC |
|---|---|---|---|---|---|---|---|---|---|---|---|---|---|---|---|---|---|---|---|---|---|---|---|---|---|---|
| 2005 | Jordan Grand Prix | EJ15 | RVX-05 3.0 V10 | B | | AUS | MAL | BHR | SMR | ESP | MON | EUR | CAN | USA | FRA | GBR | GER | HUN | TUR | ITA | BEL | BRA | JPN | CHN | 12 | 9th |
| 2005 | Jordan Grand Prix | EJ15 | RVX-05 3.0 V10 | B | (Portugal) Tiago Monteiro | 16 | 12 | 10 | 13 | 12 | 13 | 15 | 10 | 3 | 13 | 17 | 17 | 13 | 15 | 17 | 8 | Ret | 13 | 11 | 12 | 9th |
| 2005 | Jordan Grand Prix | EJ15 | RVX-05 3.0 V10 | B | (India) Narain Karthikeyan | 15 | 11 | Ret | 12 | 13 | Ret | 16 | Ret | 4 | 15 | Ret | 16 | 12 | 14 | 20 | 11 | 15 | 15 | Ret | 12 | 9th |
| 2006 | Midland F1 Racing Spyker MF1 Racing | M16 | RVX-06 2.4 V8 | B | | BHR | MAL | AUS | SMR | EUR | ESP | MON | GBR | CAN | USA | FRA | GER | HUN | TUR | ITA | CHN | JPN | BRA | | 0 | 10th |
| 2006 | Midland F1 Racing Spyker MF1 Racing | M16 | RVX-06 2.4 V8 | B | (Portugal) Tiago Monteiro | 17 | 13 | Ret | 16 | 12 | 16 | 15 | 16 | 14 | Ret | Ret | DSQ | 9 | Ret | Ret | Ret | 16 | 15 | | 0 | 10th |
| 2006 | Midland F1 Racing Spyker MF1 Racing | M16 | RVX-06 2.4 V8 | B | (Netherlands) Christijan Albers | Ret | 12 | 11 | Ret | 13 | Ret | 12 | 15 | Ret | Ret | 15 | DSQ | 10 | Ret | 17 | 15 | Ret | 14 | | 0 | 10th |
| 2007 | AT&T Williams | FW29 | RVX-07 2.4 V8 | B | | AUS | MAL | BHR | ESP | MON | CAN | USA | FRA | GBR | EUR | HUN | TUR | ITA | BEL | JPN | CHN | BRA | | | 33 | 4th |
| 2007 | AT&T Williams | FW29 | RVX-07 2.4 V8 | B | (Germany) Nico Rosberg | 7 | Ret | 10 | 6 | 12 | 10 | 16^{†} | 9 | 12 | Ret | 7 | 7 | 6 | 6 | Ret | 16 | 4 | | | 33 | 4th |
| 2007 | AT&T Williams | FW29 | RVX-07 2.4 V8 | B | (Austria) Alexander Wurz | Ret | 9 | 11 | Ret | 7 | 3 | 10 | 14 | 13 | 4 | 14 | 11 | 13 | Ret | Ret | 12 | | | | 33 | 4th |
| 2007 | AT&T Williams | FW29 | RVX-07 2.4 V8 | B | (Japan) Kazuki Nakajima | | | | | | | | | | | | | | | | | 10 | | | 33 | 4th |
| 2008 | AT&T Williams | FW30 | RVX-08 2.4 V8 | B | | AUS | MAL | BHR | ESP | TUR | MON | CAN | FRA | GBR | GER | HUN | EUR | BEL | ITA | SIN | JPN | CHN | BRA | | 26 | 8th |
| 2008 | AT&T Williams | FW30 | RVX-08 2.4 V8 | B | (Germany) Nico Rosberg | 3 | 14 | 8 | Ret | 8 | Ret | 10 | 16 | 9 | 10 | 14 | 8 | 12 | 14 | 2 | 11 | 15 | 12 | | 26 | 8th |
| 2008 | AT&T Williams | FW30 | RVX-08 2.4 V8 | B | (Japan) Kazuki Nakajima | 6 | 17 | 14 | 7 | Ret | 7 | Ret | 15 | 8 | 14 | 13 | 15 | 14 | 12 | 8 | 15 | 12 | 17 | | 26 | 8th |
| 2009 | AT&T Williams | FW31 | RVX-09 2.4 V8 | B | | AUS | MAL | CHN | BHR | ESP | MON | TUR | GBR | GER | HUN | EUR | BEL | ITA | SIN | JPN | BRA | ABU | | | 34.5 | 7th |
| 2009 | AT&T Williams | FW31 | RVX-09 2.4 V8 | B | (Germany) Nico Rosberg | 6^{F} | 8^{‡} | 15 | 9 | 8 | 6 | 5 | 5 | 4 | 4 | 5 | 8 | 16 | 11 | 5 | Ret | 9 | | | 34.5 | 7th |
| 2009 | AT&T Williams | FW31 | RVX-09 2.4 V8 | B | (Japan) Kazuki Nakajima | Ret | 12 | Ret | Ret | 13 | 15 | 12 | 11 | 12 | 9 | 18 | 13 | 10 | 9 | 15 | Ret | 13 | | | 34.5 | 7th |

† Driver did not finish the Grand Prix, but was classified as he completed over 90% of the race distance.
‡ Half points awarded as less than 75% of race distance was completed.

== See also ==
- Toyota Motorsport
- Toyota Racing Development
- Toyota
- Tsutomu Tomita
- John Howett
