= John Howett =

- Born: 26 July 1952 (age 73)

John Howett (born 26 July 1952) is the former President of Toyota Motorsport, and the Toyota F1 team.

== Career ==
Howett joined Toyota in the late 1970s as a team coordinator for Brussels-based Toyota Team Europe, run by former Toyota F1 boss Ove Andersson. Moving back to England in 1980, he worked for Toyota in after-sales service. In 1991, he returned to Belgium, and worked his way up to be Vice President for Toyota/Lexus sales and marketing.

In early 2003, Howett moved to Cologne, Germany, where he was made President of Toyota Motorsport, a position he has maintained until June 2010.

After a start to the 2007 season that saw Toyota maintain 5th in the constructors' standings after the first three races, Howett said the team were looking to chase 3rd placed BMW Sauber and break away from the front of the midfield bunch of teams, which would go a step further to fulfilling their pre-season ambitions.

In 2009 Toyota announced that it would no longer be involved in Formula 1 racing and this also meant that he could no longer be deputy chair of Formula one Teams Association (FOTA).

In 2010 Howett was replaced as president by Executive Vice President Yoshiaki Kinoshita and his role changed to being an adviser.
