= Toyota RVX engine =

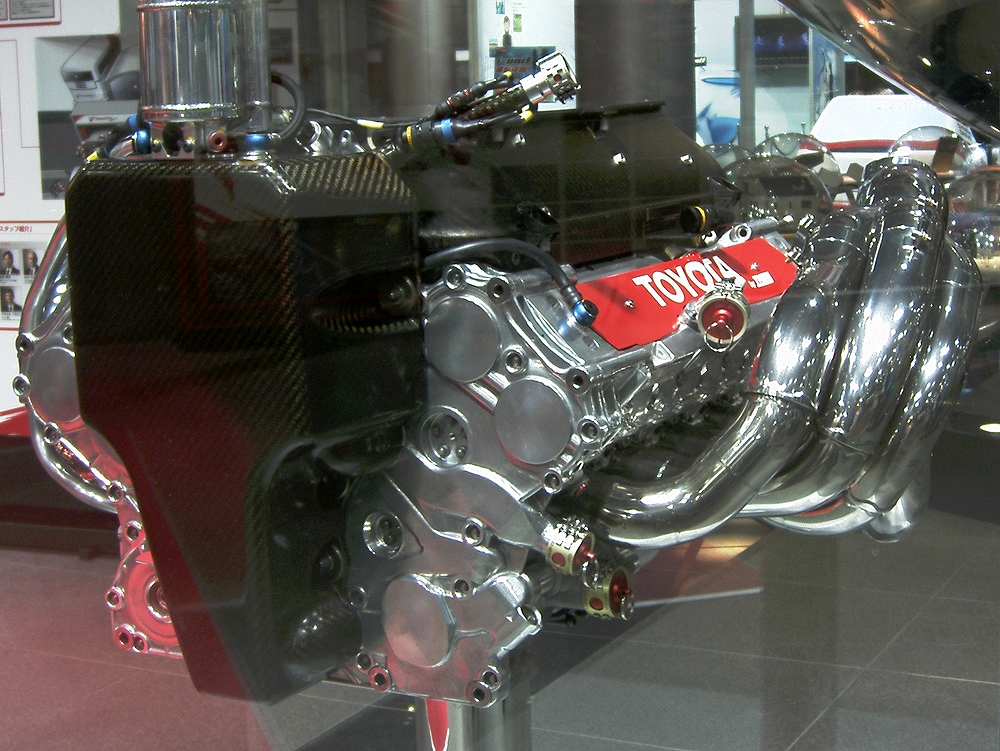

Overview
- Manufacturer: (Japan) Toyota
- Production: 2002–2009

Layout
- Configuration: 90° V10 and V8
- Displacement: 3.0 L (2,999 cc); 2.4 L (2,399 cc)
- Cylinder bore: 96.8 mm (3.8 in)
- Piston stroke: 40.75 mm (1.6 in)

Combustion
- Fuel system: Magneti Marelli electronic fuel injection
- Fuel type: Esso high-octane unleaded gasoline
- Cooling system: Water-cooled

Output
- Power output: 740–1,000 hp (552–746 kW; 750–1,014 PS)
- Torque output: 236–310 lb⋅ft (320–420 N⋅m)

Dimensions
- Dry weight: 109 kg (240 lb)

The Toyota RVX engine is a series of four-stroke, naturally-aspirated, V10 and V8 racing engines, developed and engineered by Toyota for Formula One racing, and used by Toyota, Jordan, Midland, and Williams, from 2002 to 2009.

== Applications ==
- Jordan EJ15/EJ15B
- Midland M16
- Toyota TF101 (never raced)
- Toyota TF102
- Toyota TF103
- Toyota TF104/TF104B
- Toyota TF105/TF105B
- Toyota TF106/TF106B
- Toyota TF107
- Toyota TF108
- Toyota TF109
- Toyota TF110 (never raced)
- Williams FW29
- Williams FW30
- Williams FW31

== Specifications ==
Specifications of the 2009 RVX-09 include the following:

- Naturally aspirated 90° V8
- 96.8 mm × 40.77 mm/2399 cc
- Unleaded gasoline (5.75% bio ethanol)
- Aluminium block and heads, Linerless
- Five main bearings, plain Steel crankshaft, four pins
- Titanium con rods
- Light alloy pistons, two rings
- Double overhead camshafts Four valves/cylinder, one plug
- 10.2° intake valve inclination, 11° exhaust, each with 3.2° compound angle
- 41.5 mm intake valve, 33.5 mm exhaust
- Full engine management system (SECU) Electronic ignition Sequential injection
- 13.6:1 compression ratio Maximum rpm, 18,000 (by regulation)

== Complete Formula One results ==
=== As a chassis constructor ===
(key)

Year	Chassis	Engine	Tyres	Drivers	1	2	3	4	5	6	7	8	9	10	11	12	13	14	15	16	17	18	19	Points	WCC
2002	TF102	RVX-02 3.0 V10	MI		AUS	MAL	BRA	SMR	ESP	AUT	MON	CAN	EUR	GBR	FRA	GER	HUN	BEL	ITA	USA	JPN			2	10th
2002	TF102	RVX-02 3.0 V10	MI	(Finland) Mika Salo	6	12	6	Ret	9	8	Ret	Ret	Ret	Ret	Ret	9	15	7	11	14	8			2	10th
2002	TF102	RVX-02 3.0 V10	MI	(United Kingdom) Allan McNish	Ret	7	Ret	Ret	8	9	Ret	Ret	14	Ret	11^{†}	Ret	14	9	Ret	15	DNS			2	10th
2003	TF103	RVX-03 3.0 V10	MI		AUS	MAL	BRA	SMR	ESP	AUT	MON	CAN	EUR	FRA	GBR	GER	HUN	ITA	USA	JPN				16	8th
2003	TF103	RVX-03 3.0 V10	MI	(France) Olivier Panis	Ret	Ret	Ret	9	Ret	Ret	13	8	Ret	8	11	5	Ret	Ret	Ret	10				16	8th
2003	TF103	RVX-03 3.0 V10	MI	(Brazil) Cristiano da Matta	Ret	11	10	12	6	10	9	11^{†}	Ret	11	7	6	11	Ret	9	7				16	8th
2004	TF104; TF104B	RVX-04 3.0 V10	MI		AUS	MAL	BHR	SMR	ESP	MON	EUR	CAN	USA	FRA	GBR	GER	HUN	BEL	ITA	CHN	JPN	BRA		9	8th
2004	TF104; TF104B	RVX-04 3.0 V10	MI	(Brazil) Cristiano da Matta	12	9	10	Ret	13	6	Ret	DSQ	Ret	14	13	Ret								9	8th
2004	TF104; TF104B	RVX-04 3.0 V10	MI	(Brazil) Ricardo Zonta													Ret	10^{†}	11	Ret		13		9	8th
2004	TF104; TF104B	RVX-04 3.0 V10	MI	(Italy) Jarno Trulli																	11	12		9	8th
2004	TF104; TF104B	RVX-04 3.0 V10	MI	(France) Olivier Panis	13	12	9	11	Ret	8	11	DSQ	5	15	Ret	14	11	8	Ret	14	14			9	8th
2005	TF105; TF105B	RVX-05 3.0 V10	MI		AUS	MAL	BHR	SMR	ESP	MON	EUR	CAN	USA	FRA	GBR	GER	HUN	TUR	ITA	BEL	BRA	JPN	CHN	88	4th
2005	TF105; TF105B	RVX-05 3.0 V10	MI	(Italy) Jarno Trulli	9	2	2	5	3	10	8	Ret	DNS^{P}	5	9	14^{†}	4	6	5	Ret	13^{†}	Ret	15	88	4th
2005	TF105; TF105B	RVX-05 3.0 V10	MI	(Germany) Ralf Schumacher	12	5	4	9	4	6	Ret	6	WD	7	8	6	3	12	6	7^{F}	8	8^{P}	3	88	4th
2005	TF105; TF105B	RVX-05 3.0 V10	MI	(Brazil) Ricardo Zonta									DNS											88	4th
2006	TF106; TF106B	RVX-06 2.4 V8	B		BHR	MAL	AUS	SMR	EUR	ESP	MON	GBR	CAN	USA	FRA	GER	HUN	TUR	ITA	CHN	JPN	BRA		35	6th
2006	TF106; TF106B	RVX-06 2.4 V8	B	(Germany) Ralf Schumacher	14	8	3	9	Ret	Ret	8	Ret	Ret	Ret	4	9	6	7	15	Ret	7	Ret		35	6th
2006	TF106; TF106B	RVX-06 2.4 V8	B	(Italy) Jarno Trulli	16	9	Ret	Ret	9	10	17^{†}	11	6	4	Ret	7	12^{†}	9	7	Ret	6	Ret		35	6th
2007	TF107	RVX-07 2.4 V8	B		AUS	MAL	BHR	ESP	MON	CAN	USA	FRA	GBR	EUR	HUN	TUR	ITA	BEL	JPN	CHN	BRA			13	6th
2007	TF107	RVX-07 2.4 V8	B	(Germany) Ralf Schumacher	8	15	12	Ret	16	8	Ret	10	Ret	Ret	6	12	15	10	Ret	Ret	11			13	6th
2007	TF107	RVX-07 2.4 V8	B	(Italy) Jarno Trulli	9	7	7	Ret	15	Ret	6	Ret	Ret	13	10	16	11	11	13	13	8			13	6th
2008	TF108	RVX-08 2.4 V8	B		AUS	MAL	BHR	ESP	TUR	MON	CAN	FRA	GBR	GER	HUN	EUR	BEL	ITA	SIN	JPN	CHN	BRA		56	5th
2008	TF108	RVX-08 2.4 V8	B	(Italy) Jarno Trulli	Ret	4	6	8	10	13	6	3	7	9	7	5	16	13	Ret	5	Ret	8		56	5th
2008	TF108	RVX-08 2.4 V8	B	(Germany) Timo Glock	Ret	Ret	9	11	13	12	4	11	12	Ret	2	7	9	11	4	Ret	7	6		56	5th
2009	TF109	RVX-09 2.4 V8	B		AUS	MAL	CHN	BHR	ESP	MON	TUR	GBR	GER	HUN	EUR	BEL	ITA	SIN	JPN	BRA	ABU			59.5	5th
2009	TF109	RVX-09 2.4 V8	B	(Italy) Jarno Trulli	3	4^{‡}	Ret	3^{P}^{F}	Ret	13	4	7	17	8	13	Ret	14	12	2	Ret	7			59.5	5th
2009	TF109	RVX-09 2.4 V8	B	(Germany) Timo Glock	4	3^{‡}	7	7	10	10	8	9	9	6	14^{F}	10	11	2	DNS					59.5	5th
2009	TF109	RVX-09 2.4 V8	B	(Japan) Kamui Kobayashi																9	6			59.5	5th

‡ Half points awarded as less than 75% of race distance was completed.

=== As an engine supplier ===
(key)

Year	Team	Chassis	Engine	Tyres	Drivers	1	2	3	4	5	6	7	8	9	10	11	12	13	14	15	16	17	18	19	Points	WCC
2005	Jordan Grand Prix	EJ15; EJ15B	RVX-05 3.0 V10	B		AUS	MAL	BHR	SMR	ESP	MON	EUR	CAN	USA	FRA	GBR	GER	HUN	TUR	ITA	BEL	BRA	JPN	CHN	12	9th
2005	Jordan Grand Prix	EJ15; EJ15B	RVX-05 3.0 V10	B	(Portugal) Tiago Monteiro	16	12	10	13	12	13	15	10	3	13	17	17	13	15	17	8	Ret	13	11	12	9th
2005	Jordan Grand Prix	EJ15; EJ15B	RVX-05 3.0 V10	B	(India) Narain Karthikeyan	15	11	Ret	12	13	Ret	16	Ret	4	15	Ret	16	12	14	20	11	15	15	Ret	12	9th
2006	Midland F1 Racing Spyker MF1 Racing	M16	RVX-06 2.4 V8	B		BHR	MAL	AUS	SMR	EUR	ESP	MON	GBR	CAN	USA	FRA	GER	HUN	TUR	ITA	CHN	JPN	BRA		0	10th
2006	Midland F1 Racing Spyker MF1 Racing	M16	RVX-06 2.4 V8	B	(Portugal) Tiago Monteiro	17	13	Ret	16	12	16	15	16	14	Ret	Ret	DSQ	9	Ret	Ret	Ret	16	15		0	10th
2006	Midland F1 Racing Spyker MF1 Racing	M16	RVX-06 2.4 V8	B	(Netherlands) Christijan Albers	Ret	12	11	Ret	13	Ret	12	15	Ret	Ret	15	DSQ	10	Ret	17	15	Ret	14		0	10th
2007	AT&T Williams	FW29	RVX-07 2.4 V8	B		AUS	MAL	BHR	ESP	MON	CAN	USA	FRA	GBR	EUR	HUN	TUR	ITA	BEL	JPN	CHN	BRA			33	4th
2007	AT&T Williams	FW29	RVX-07 2.4 V8	B	(Germany) Nico Rosberg	7	Ret	10	6	12	10	16^{†}	9	12	Ret	7	7	6	6	Ret	16	4			33	4th
2007	AT&T Williams	FW29	RVX-07 2.4 V8	B	(Austria) Alexander Wurz	Ret	9	11	Ret	7	3	10	14	13	4	14	11	13	Ret	Ret	12				33	4th
2007	AT&T Williams	FW29	RVX-07 2.4 V8	B	(Japan) Kazuki Nakajima																	10			33	4th
2008	AT&T Williams	FW30	RVX-08 2.4 V8	B		AUS	MAL	BHR	ESP	TUR	MON	CAN	FRA	GBR	GER	HUN	EUR	BEL	ITA	SIN	JPN	CHN	BRA		26	8th
2008	AT&T Williams	FW30	RVX-08 2.4 V8	B	(Germany) Nico Rosberg	3	14	8	Ret	8	Ret	10	16	9	10	14	8	12	14	2	11	15	12		26	8th
2008	AT&T Williams	FW30	RVX-08 2.4 V8	B	(Japan) Kazuki Nakajima	6	17	14	7	Ret	7	Ret	15	8	14	13	15	14	12	8	15	12	17		26	8th
2009	AT&T Williams	FW31	RVX-09 2.4 V8	B		AUS	MAL	CHN	BHR	ESP	MON	TUR	GBR	GER	HUN	EUR	BEL	ITA	SIN	JPN	BRA	ABU			34.5	7th
2009	AT&T Williams	FW31	RVX-09 2.4 V8	B	(Germany) Nico Rosberg	6^{F}	8^{‡}	15	9	8	6	5	5	4	4	5	8	16	11	5	Ret	9			34.5	7th
2009	AT&T Williams	FW31	RVX-09 2.4 V8	B	(Japan) Kazuki Nakajima	Ret	12	Ret	Ret	13	15	12	11	12	9	18	13	10	9	15	Ret	13			34.5	7th

† Driver did not finish the Grand Prix, but was classified as he completed over 90% of the race distance.
‡ Half points awarded as less than 75% of race distance was completed.

== See also ==
- Renault RS engine
- Peugeot F1 engine
- Mercedes-Benz FO engine
- Ferrari V10 engine
- Petronas F1 engine
- Cosworth CR engine
- BMW E41 / P80 engine
- Honda V10 engine
- Asiatech F1 engine
- Cosworth TJ / CA engine
