= Toyota TF108 =

2008 Formula One season car

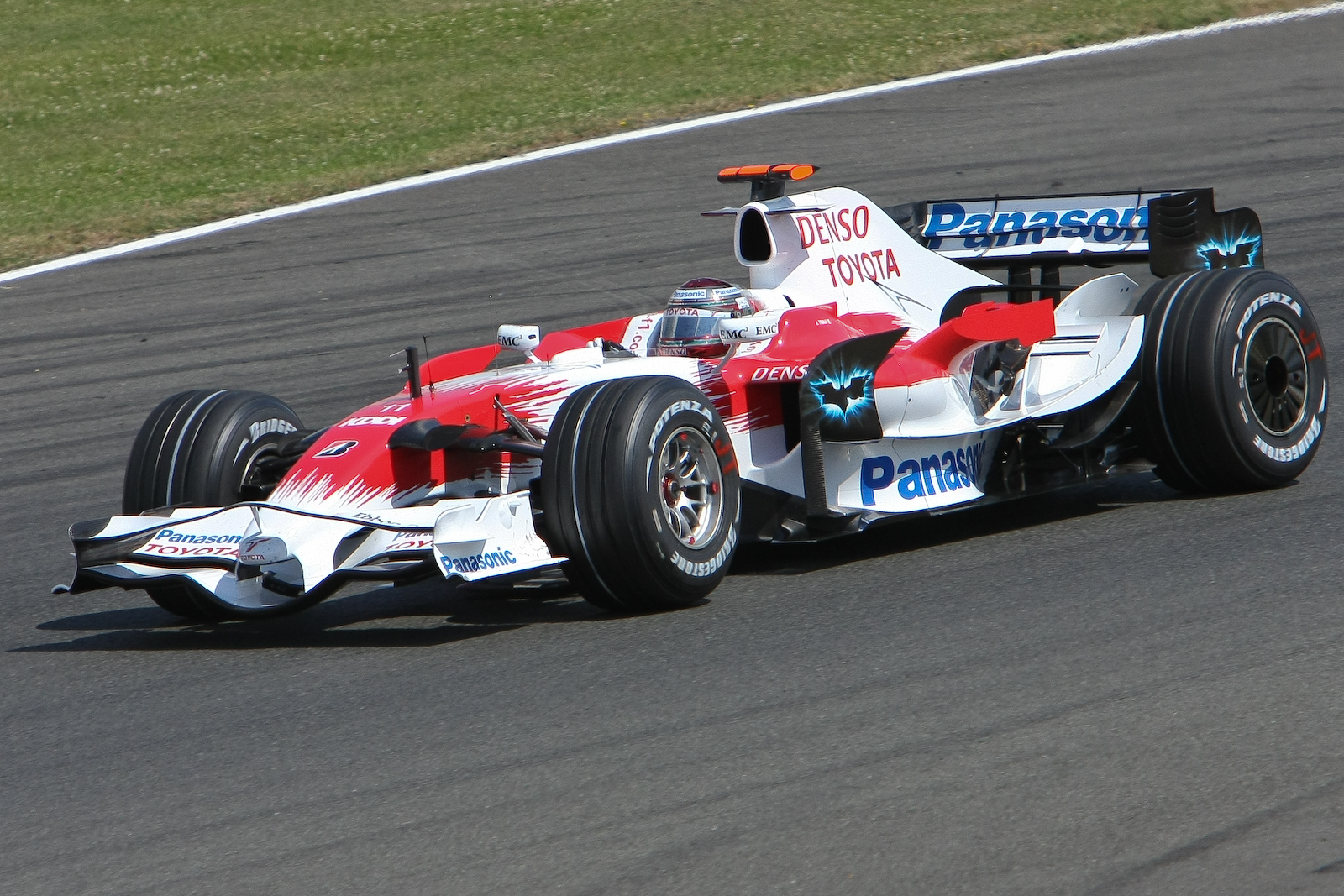
- Jarno Trulli driving the TF108 at the 2008 British Grand Prix
- Category: Formula One
- Constructor: Toyota
- Designers: Yoshiaki Kinoshita (Executive Vice President - Technical); Noritoshi Arai (Director Technical Coordination); Pascal Vasselon (Senior General Manager Chassis); John Litjens (Chief Designer); David Neilsen (Chief Designer - Car Concept); Mark Gillan (Head of Aerodynamics); Jason Somerville (Deputy Head of Aerodynamics); Luca Marmorini (Engine Director); Hiroshi Yajima (Chief Designer, Engine)
- Predecessor: TF107
- Successor: TF109

Technical specifications
- Chassis: Moulded carbon fibre and honeycomb construction monocoque
- Suspension (front): Carbon-fibre double wishbone arrangement, with carbon-fibre track rod and pushrod
- Suspension (rear): Carbon-fibre double wishbone arrangement, with carbon-fibre track rod and pushrod
- Engine: Toyota RVX-08 2398 cc V8 19,000 RPM Limited naturally-aspirated mid-engine
- Transmission: Toyota/WilliamsF1/Xtrac collaboration 7-speed unit plus reverse
- Power: 750 hp @ 19,000 rpm
- Fuel: Esso
- Lubricants: Esso
- Brakes: Brembo callipers and master cylinders, Hitco material (carbon/carbon)
- Tyres: Bridgestone Potenza; BBS forged magnesium

Competition history
- Notable entrants: Panasonic Toyota Racing
- Notable drivers: 11. (Italy) Jarno Trulli; 12. (Germany) Timo Glock
- Debut: 2008 Australian Grand Prix
- Last event: 2008 Brazilian Grand Prix
| Races | Wins | Podiums | Poles | F/Laps |
|---|---|---|---|---|
| 18 | 0 | 2 | 0 | 0 |

The Toyota TF108 was a Formula One car designed and engineered by Toyota to compete in the 2008 Formula One season. The chassis was designed by Pascal Vasselon, John Litjens and Mark Gillan with the engine being designed by Luca Marmorini and Noritoshi Arai overseeing the entire project. The car's best finish was second in the Hungarian Grand Prix, driven by Timo Glock.

== Launch ==
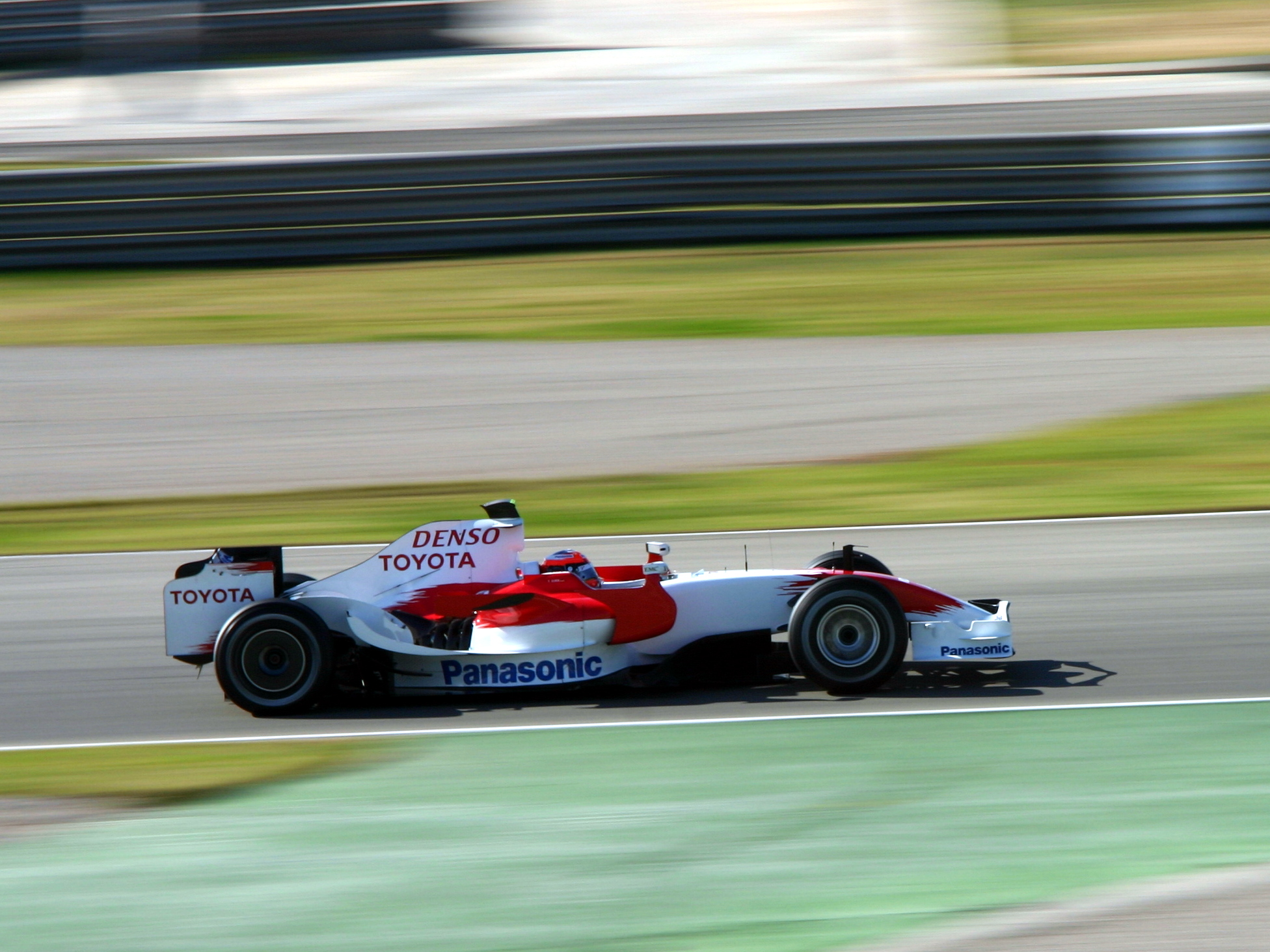
Timo Glock testing the TF108 at Valencia, 01-23-2008.

The 2008 Toyota challenger, the Toyota TF108, was launched on 10 January 2008, at the team's factory in Cologne, Germany.

Jarno Trulli was retained as one of the team's drivers for the 2008 season and was joined by former Jordan driver Timo Glock. The Toyota test and reserve driver for the 2008 season was Japanese driver Kamui Kobayashi.

The Toyota team let driver Ralf Schumacher go at the end of the 2007 Formula One season, Schumacher then signed a contract with Mercedes-Benz in the DTM for the 2008 season.

== Technical developments ==
=== New concept design ===
The TF108 had a new longer wheelbase to aid stability and a totally new aero package that was hoped to give the car great potential. It was not an evolution of the previous year's TF107; instead it had been designed from an evolution of the TF106, used for the 2006 season. Pascal Vasselon, the team's chassis general manager noted that the "primary aerodynamic design philosophy for the TF108 is geared towards optimising the entire package".

=== Rule changes ===
The car also had the new for 2008 higher headrests around the drivers head and also had the new standard McLaren Electronic Systems ECU that prevented the car having driver aids.

=== Changes in aerodynamics ===
Toyota had adopted a McLaren MP4-22-like bridge on the front wing, and also moved the rear view mirrors outboard, like Ferrari and Renault. The TF108 had also had a major focus on cleaning the air flow around the front suspension, maximising the zero keel concept of the front suspension. From the Hungarian Grand Prix onwards, both cars had a shark fin attached to the engine cover.

== Sponsorship and livery ==
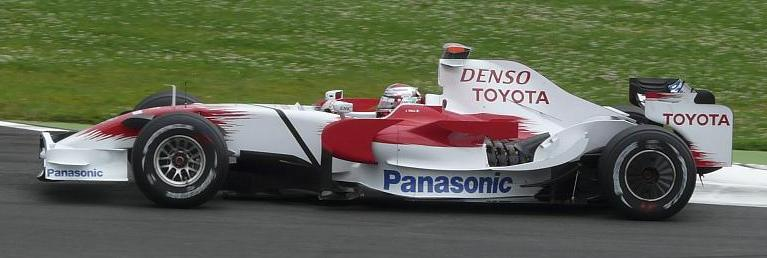
Jarno Trulli driving the TF108 at the French GP. Note the black stripe on the nosecone.

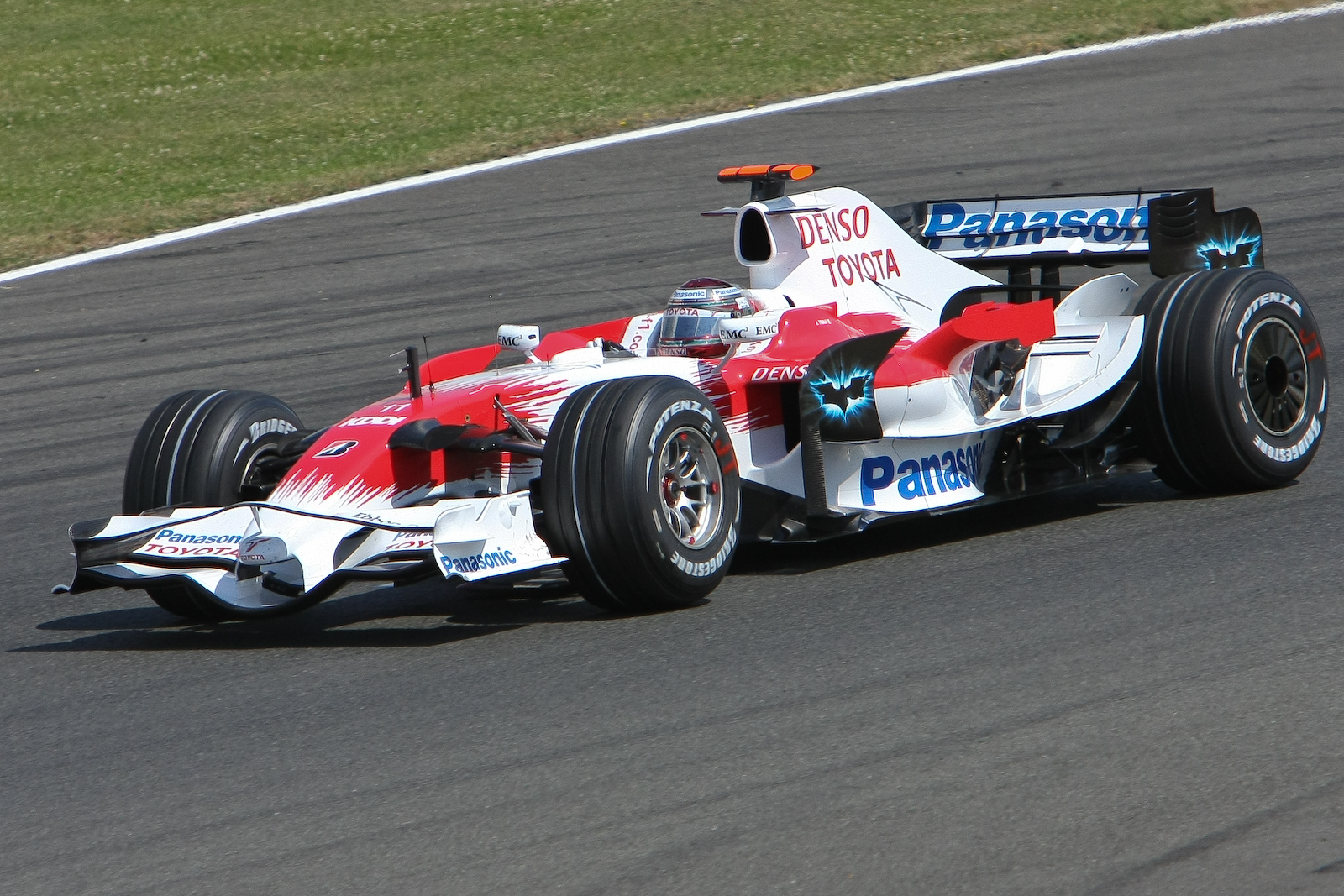
The TF108's The Dark Knight livery at the British GP.

The race car featured the red-and-white livery typical of Toyota. In addition, the car manufacturer’s branding appeared on the rear wing and the engine cover. The primary sponsor of Toyota was the consumer electronics company Panasonic, whose name was displayed on the sidepods. Furthermore, Denso and KDDI were also featured on the vehicle as sponsors.

At the French Grand Prix, the car ran a black stripe along the nosecone to commemorate the life of former boss, Ove Andersson, who had died earlier that month.

At the British Grand Prix, the car ran with a special Batman livery, the logo featured on the sidepods and rear wing. The team signed a deal with Warner Brothers to promote the new film, The Dark Knight, which was released on 25 July.

== 2008 season ==
=== 2008 testing ===
Timo Glock was fastest in testing at Jerez on 17 January, whilst test driver Kamui Kobayashi was 7th fastest on the same day.

Toyota and Ferrari had been the only teams in 2008 to test outside the common test tracks in Spain (Valencia, Jerez and the Circuit de Catalunya), having chosen to test in sunnier conditions in Bahrain from the 4th to 6 February and 9th until 11 February 2008.

Later in the month of February, Toyota, alongside Ferrari, returned to the Circuit de Catalunya to finish off their preparations for the season opener in Melbourne. Toyota rolled out a new aero package, with Pascal Vasselon saying that "The new aerodynamics package we brought here is a clear step forward". The very next day, Jarno Trulli completed the day with a time of 1.20.801, fastest overall, Red Bull-Renault driver David Coulthard was second with a time of 01:21.258 on the same day.

=== Racing ===
The TF108 marked an improvement of form for Toyota. Trulli scored points in 10 of the 18 races, with a 3rd place in France the highlight of his season. Teammate Glock finished in the points at 6 races including 2nd in Hungary. With a total of 56 points, Toyota scored more points in 2008 then the last 2 seasons combined. Both Trulli and Glock were retained for 2009.

== Complete Formula One results ==
(key) (results in bold indicate pole position)

| Year | Team | Engine | Tyres | Drivers | 1 | 2 | 3 | 4 | 5 | 6 | 7 | 8 | 9 | 10 | 11 | 12 | 13 | 14 | 15 | 16 | 17 | 18 | Points | WCC |
|---|---|---|---|---|---|---|---|---|---|---|---|---|---|---|---|---|---|---|---|---|---|---|---|---|
| 2008 | Panasonic Toyota Racing | Toyota V8 | **B** | | AUS | MAL | BHR | ESP | TUR | MON | CAN | FRA | GBR | GER | HUN | EUR | BEL | ITA | SIN | JPN | CHN | BRA | 56 | 5th |
| 2008 | Panasonic Toyota Racing | Toyota V8 | **B** | Trulli | Ret | 4 | 6 | 8 | 10 | 13 | 6 | 3 | 7 | 9 | 7 | 5 | 16 | 13 | Ret | 5 | Ret | 8 | 56 | 5th |
| 2008 | Panasonic Toyota Racing | Toyota V8 | **B** | Glock | Ret | Ret | 9 | 11 | 13 | 12 | 4 | 11 | 12 | Ret | 2 | 7 | 9 | 11 | 4 | Ret | 7 | 6 | 56 | 5th |
