= Toyota TF110 =

Prototype Formula One Racing Car originally planned for 2010 season

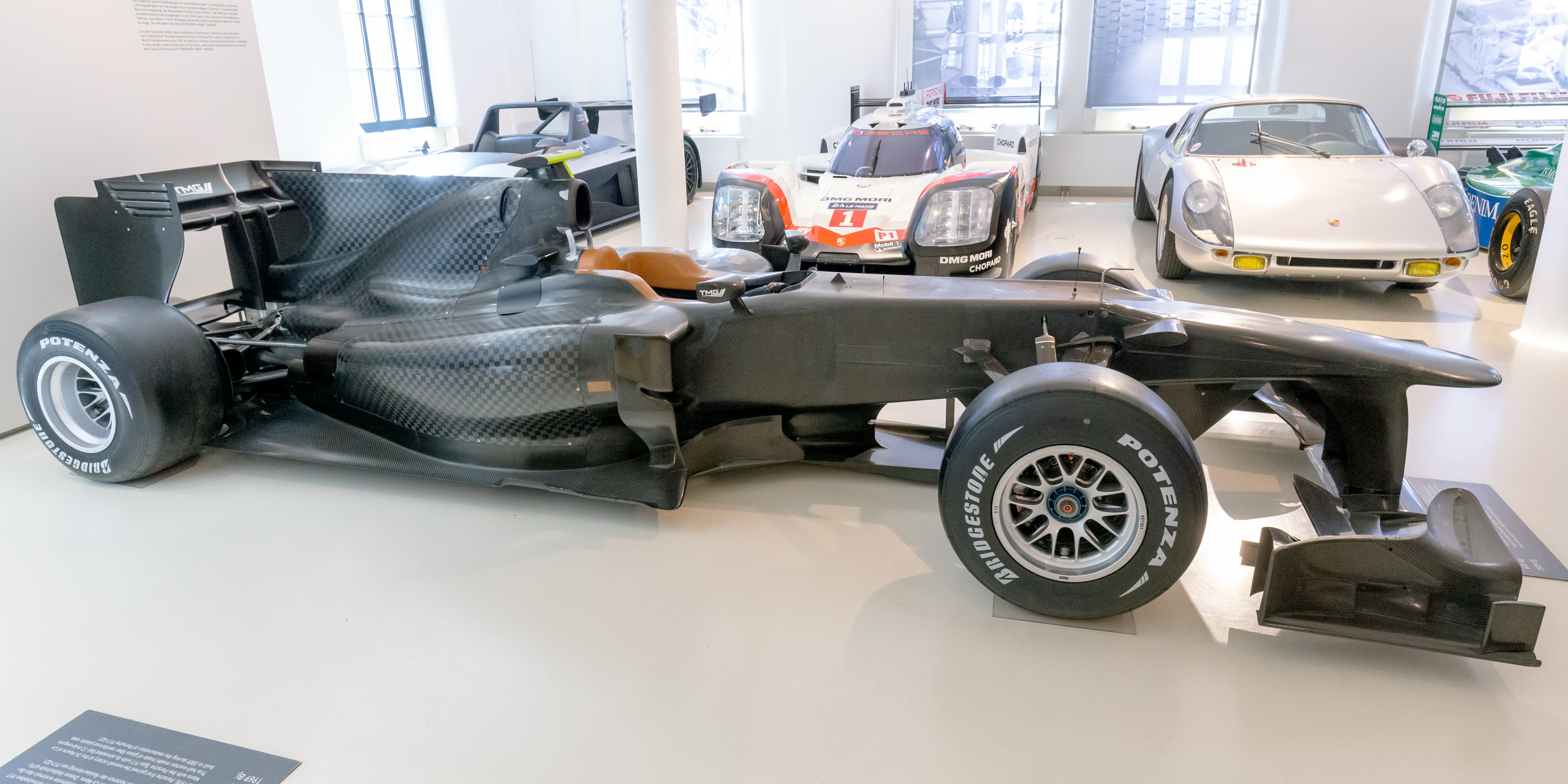
- The unraced TF110 on display at the Prototype Museum in 2019
- Category: Formula One
- Constructor: Toyota
- Designer: Pascal Vasselon
- Predecessor: Toyota TF109

Technical specifications
- Chassis: Carbon-fibre and honeycomb composite monocoque
- Suspension (front): Independent suspension, pushrod activated torsion springs
- Suspension (rear): As front
- Length: 5,050 mm (199 in)
- Width: 1,800 mm (71 in)
- Height: 950 mm (37 in)
- Wheelbase: 3,300 mm (130 in)
- Engine: Toyota RVX-10 2.4L V8, naturally aspirated, mid-mounted
- Transmission: Toyota 7 forward gears + 1 reverse semi-automatic
- Weight: 620 kg (1,367 lb)
- Tyres: Bridgestone

Competition history
- Notable entrants: Never raced
- Notable drivers: (Japan) Kazuki Nakajima (Canada) Jacques Villeneuve
- Debut: N/A
Races	Wins	Poles	F/Laps
0	0	0	0
- Constructors' Championships: 0
- Drivers' Championships: 0

The Toyota TF110 is a Formula One single-seater designed by French engineer Pascal Vasselon for the Japanese team Toyota Racing, intended for the 2010 Formula One World Championship. It is powered by a Toyota RVX-09 V8 engine and equipped with Bridgestone tires. The car never competed in a Grand Prix and was only tested in a shakedown on the parking lot of Toyota Motorsport's factory in Cologne, in May 2010, driven by Japanese driver Kazuki Nakajima.

On November 4, 2009, three days after the final race of the 2009 Formula One World Championship, held at Abu Dhabi, Toyota announced its withdrawal from Formula One, after briefly considering continuing until the 2012 season, citing challenging economic conditions due to the global economic crisis of 2008 and a net loss of €5 billion.

The Toyota TF110 is distinguished by its double diffuser, considered the most extreme ever designed in Formula One, and a raised nose. According to aerodynamic simulations, Pascal Vasselon and German driver Timo Glock, who developed the TF110 in a simulator, believed the car could have secured Toyota's first Formula One victories and potentially competed for the world championship.

Following Toyota's withdrawal, several teams attempted to acquire the intellectual property and chassis of the TF110. The most advanced effort was by the Serbian team Stefan GP, which secured a technical partnership that included the use of the car (renamed Stefan S-01), two wind tunnels, and Toyota Motorsport’s Cologne factory. However, the Fédération Internationale de l'Automobile (FIA) did not permit Stefan GP to enter the 2010 Formula One World Championship. Other teams, such as Durango Automotive and Hispania Racing F1 Team, as well as the Italian tire manufacturer Pirelli, also failed to acquire the TF110.

== Background and development ==
=== Toyota's eight seasons in Formula One (2002–2009) ===
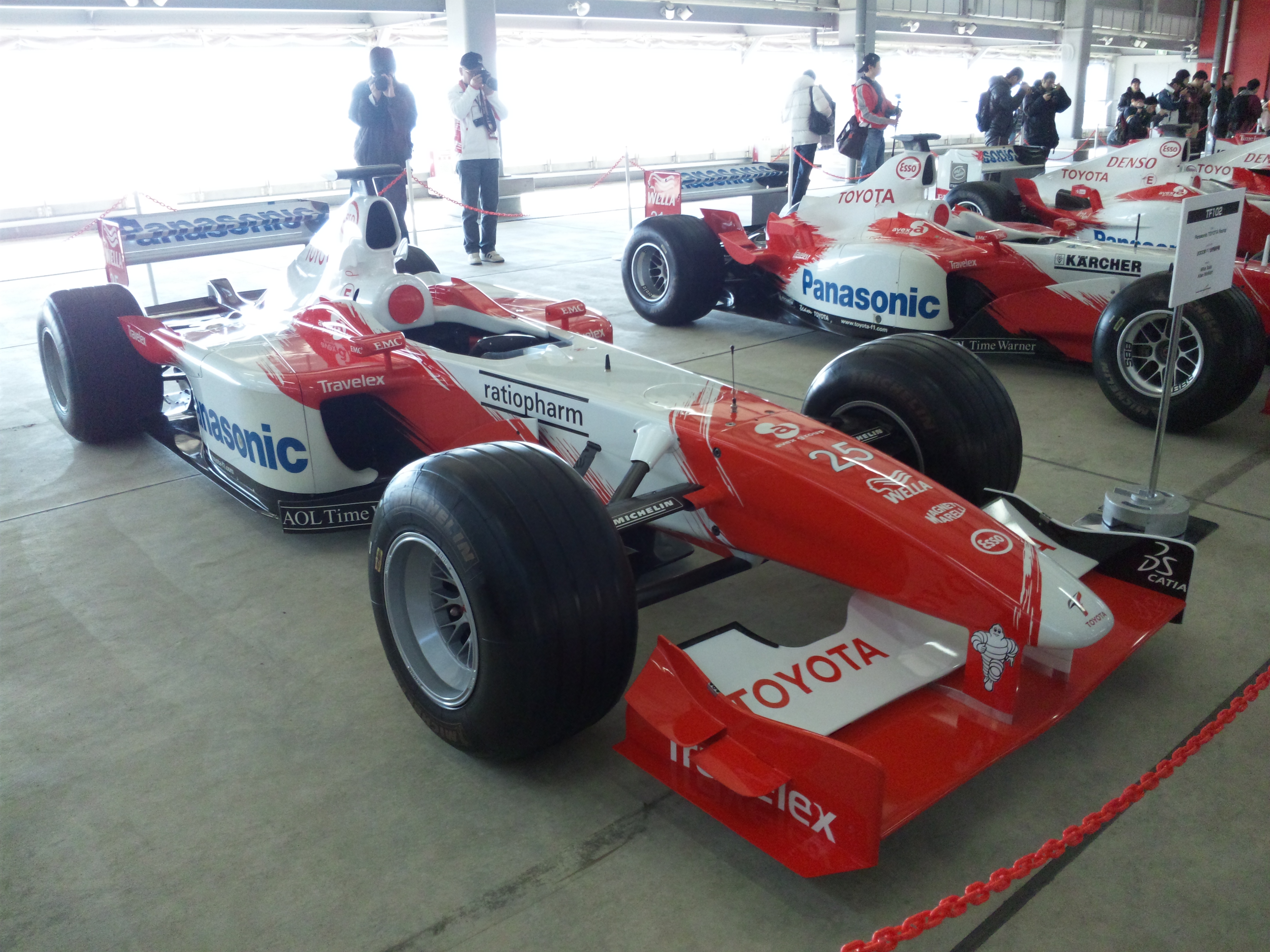
The Toyota TF102, the first Formula One car entered in 2002. Despite extensive testing, it differs entirely from the TF101 prototype.

In 1999, Japanese manufacturer Toyota, successful with seven drivers' and constructors' titles in the World Rally Championship and participation in the 24 Hours of Le Mans, announced its entry into the 2001 Formula One World Championship. The new team, Toyota Racing, was based in Cologne, where its rally and endurance programs were housed, in a facility equipped with a wind tunnel and infrastructure for developing engines, gearboxes, and spare parts. However, after planning to develop a V12 engine, the FIA's ban on this technology forced Toyota to delay its Formula One debut to the 2002 season. After a year of testing in 2001 with the prototype Toyota TF101, and with one of the largest budgets in the sport, Toyota entered the championship in 2002 with British rookie Allan McNish, an experienced test driver, and seasoned Finnish driver Mika Salo, who scored two points in the first three races. These early results led Toyota to aim for sixth place in the constructors' championship. However, the team, lacking Formula One experience, failed to develop the Toyota TF102 adequately and finished ninth, scoring no additional points. In 2003, McNish and Salo were replaced by Olivier Panis and Cristiano da Matta, but Toyota only managed eighth place in the constructors' championship.

Technical director Gustav Brunner was replaced by Mike Gascoyne from Renault, while Ove Andersson was succeeded by John Howett as team president. Howett, influenced by Toyota’s corporate culture, demanded budget cuts (Toyota’s budget was €384 million in 2004), while Gascoyne believed increased investment would improve on-track performance. The 2004 season ended with another eighth-place finish, Panis's retirement, and da Matta’s dismissal.

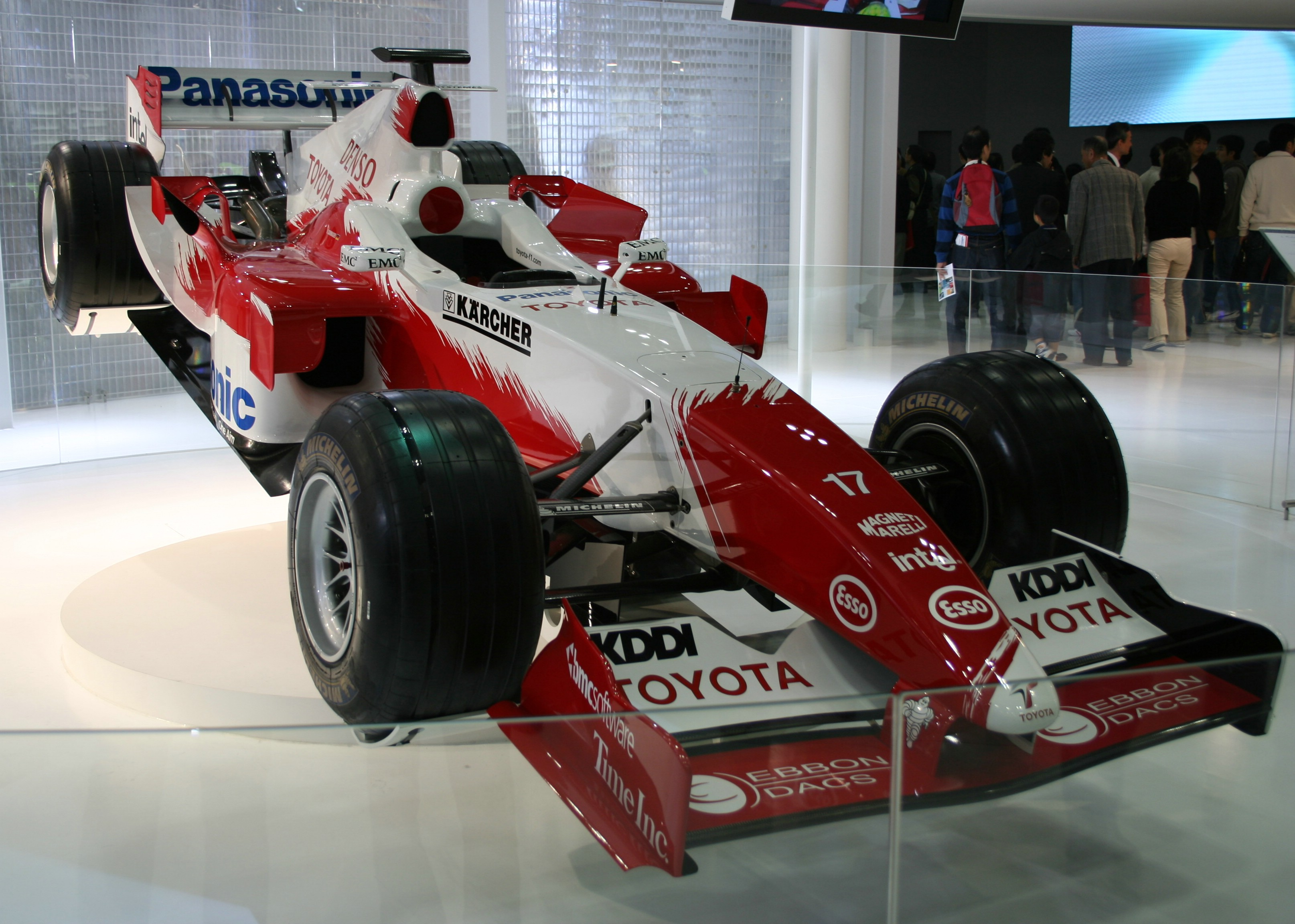
The Toyota TF105, raced in 2005, is the most successful car in Toyota’s Formula One history.

For the 2005 season, the Toyota TF105 was driven by Jarno Trulli and Ralf Schumacher, securing Toyota’s first five podiums and a fourth-place finish in the constructors’ championship. However, early in the 2006 season, Gascoyne was sacked and replaced by Pascal Vasselon. The Toyota TF106, expected to compete for race wins, proved disappointing, and Gascoyne’s rapid decision-making was criticized for clashing with Toyota’s corporate culture, The Toyota Way, which emphasizes a specific decision-making process. With new Bridgestone tires and regulations mandating V8 engines, Toyota fell to sixth place in the constructors’ championship in 2006 and 2007.

In 2008, Ralf Schumacher was replaced by Timo Glock. Alongside Trulli, Glock helped Toyota achieve fifth place in the constructors’ championship. In 2009, the Toyota TF109, equipped with a double diffuser like the Brawn BGP 001, was competitive, securing three podiums in the first four races. However, inconsistent results in qualifying and races left Toyota fifth overall.

=== End of 2009: Withdrawal from Formula One ===
At the end of 2008, Honda, Toyota’s main Japanese rival, withdrew from Formula One due to the global economic crisis. Toyota considered following suit but extended its partnership with Panasonic, its main sponsor, for 2009. The team significantly reduced its budget to approximately €165 million, laid off dozens of temporary staff, and stopped hosting the Japanese Grand Prix at its Fuji Speedway. By October 2009, Toyota contemplated withdrawing from Formula One due to the crisis and the sport’s high costs; over eight seasons, Toyota had spent around $3 billion, the highest of any team. Simultaneously, Toyota ended its engine supply partnership with Williams, which had begun in 2007.

The day after the season’s final race at Abu Dhabi, Japanese media reported that Toyota’s board convened an extraordinary meeting in Tokyo on November 4, 2009, to end its Formula One participation, despite discussions with drivers Kimi Räikkönen, Robert Kubica, and Kamui Kobayashi to race the TF110. On that date, Toyota’s president, Akio Toyoda, confirmed the withdrawal, after briefly considering continuing until 2012. This marked the third manufacturer to exit in 12 months, following Honda and BMW Sauber. With car sales down 25% in the first half of 2009 and losses exceeding €5 billion, Toyota chose to focus on its core business while continuing to support young drivers in lower-tier competitions.

Days later, rumors surfaced that Toyota was looking to sell the TF110’s plans and intellectual property, which had been in development for months and was now complete. Potential buyers included USF1 and Manor Motorsport, both eager to join the 2010 Formula One World Championship. An unnamed team’s purchase offer was rejected, and Toyota denied any plans to sell the car.

== Car design ==
=== Technical aspects ===
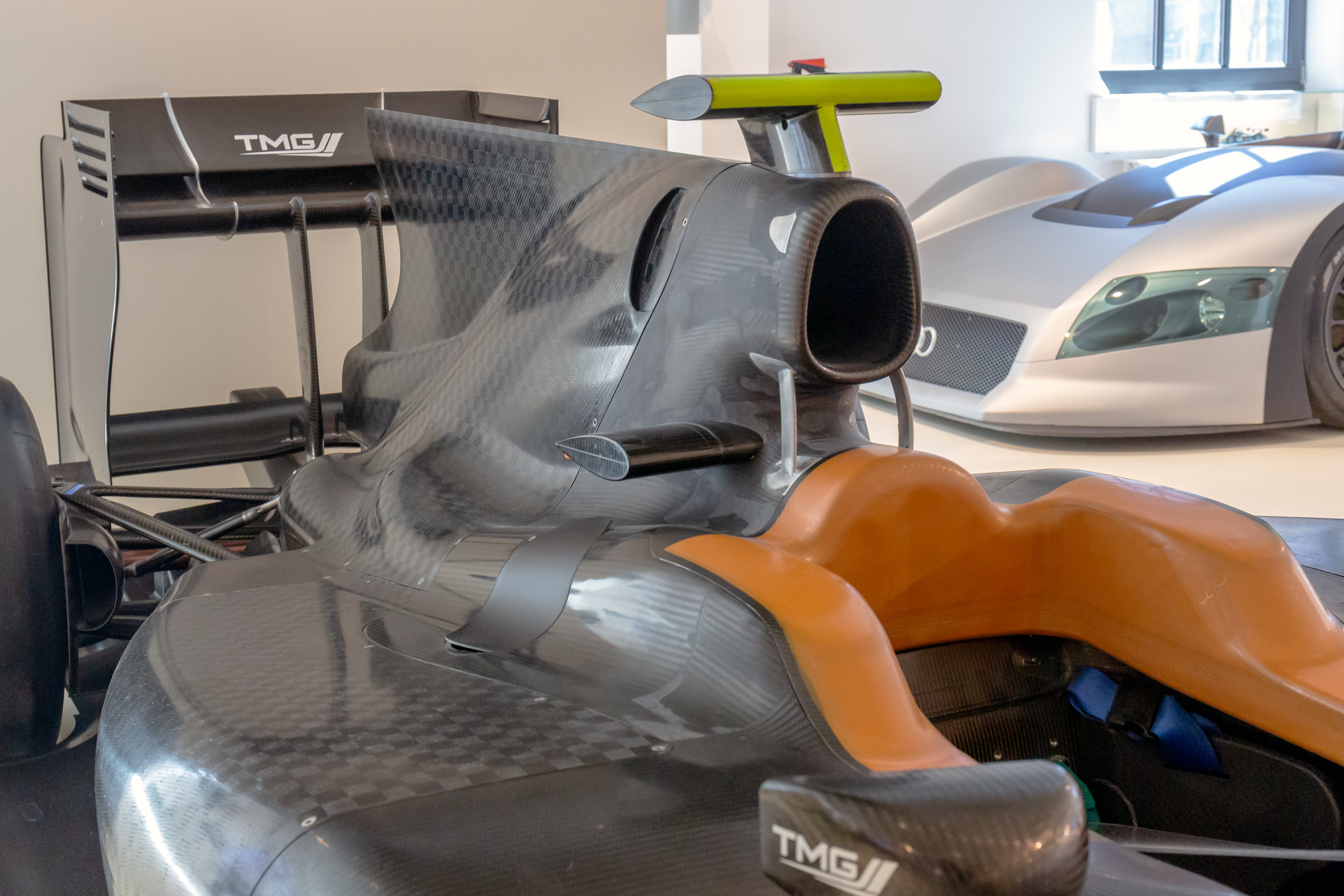
The Toyota TF110’s engine cover.

The TF110 was designed under the leadership of French engineer Pascal Vasselon, then technical director of Toyota Racing, who described it as an extreme car. Weighing 620 kilograms (1,370 lb) with the driver and 45 kilograms (99 lb) of ballast, measuring 5,050 millimetres (199 in) in length and 1,800 millimetres (71 in) in width, it features a monocoque chassis molded from carbon fiber. Its wheelbase is 3,300 millimetres (130 in), 210 millimetres (8.3 in) longer than its predecessor, the Toyota TF109, to comply with new technical regulations banning in-race refueling and to prevent excessive tire wear, a key flaw of the TF109. Two TF110 chassis were built.

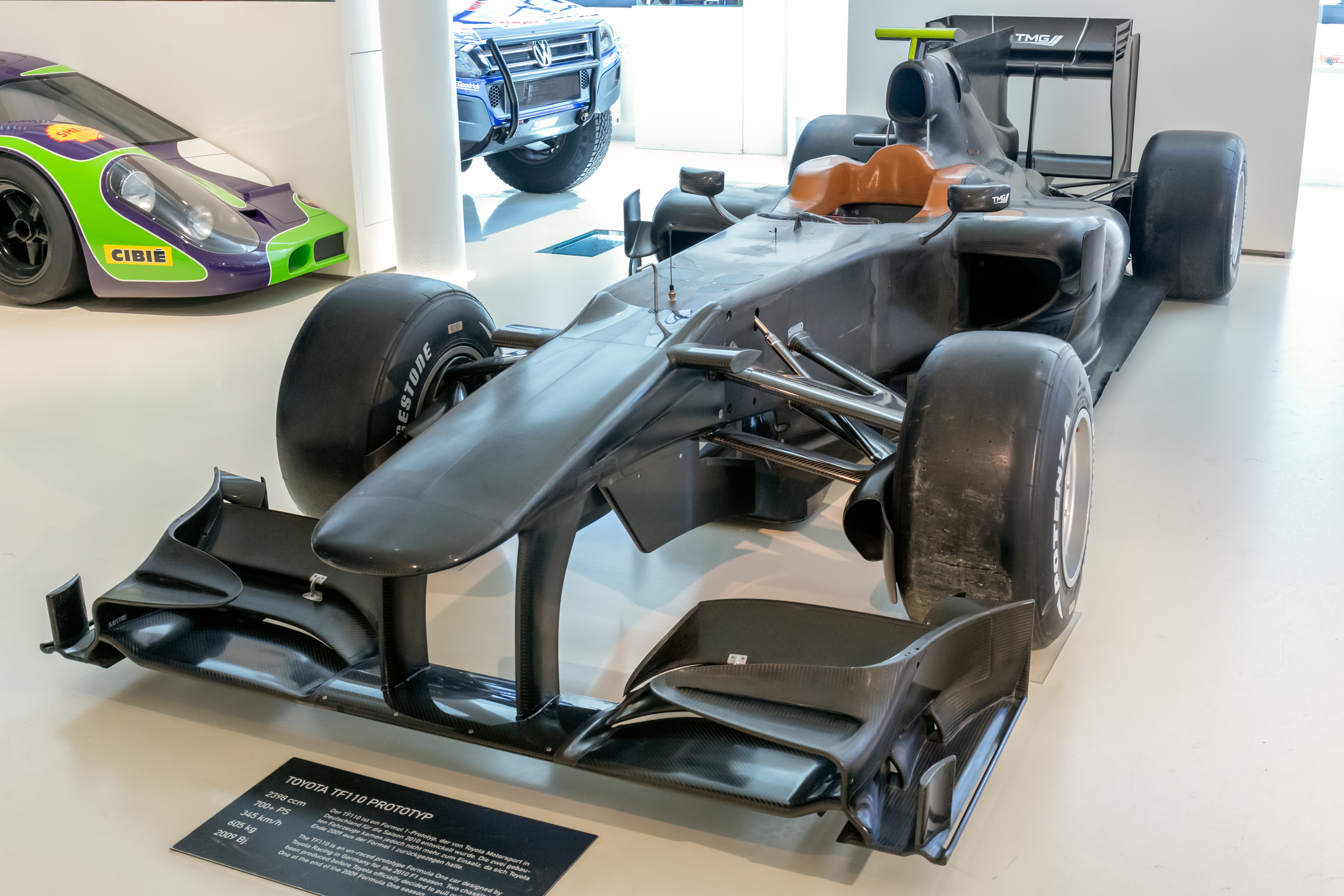
The Toyota TF110 has the longest wheelbase of any Toyota Formula One car.

The car is powered by a Toyota RVX-09 V8 engine with a displacement of 2.4 litres (150 cu in), or 2,398 cubic centimetres (146.3 cu in). Power is transmitted via a titanium longitudinal semi-automatic sequential gearbox with seven speeds, designed in-house. Due to the ban on in-race refueling and the larger 220 litres (48 imp gal; 58 US gal) fuel tank, the gearbox cooling duct was placed above the gearbox, similar to the Red Bull RB6.

The carbon disc brakes were developed by Brembo and Toyota, while the tires, mounted on BBS wheels, were supplied by Bridgestone. McLaren Electronics System and Microsoft provided the electronic components.

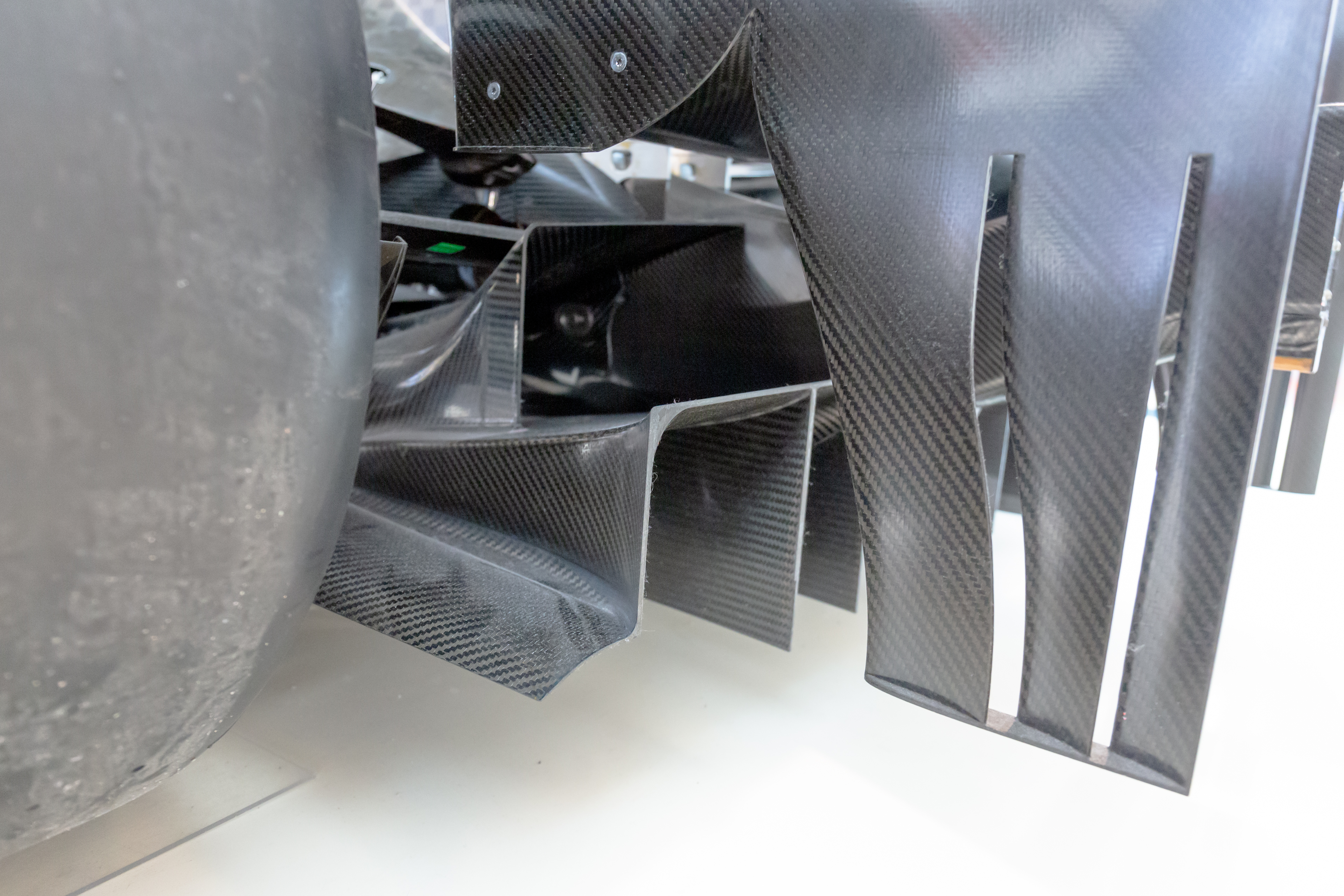
The Toyota TF110’s diffuser.

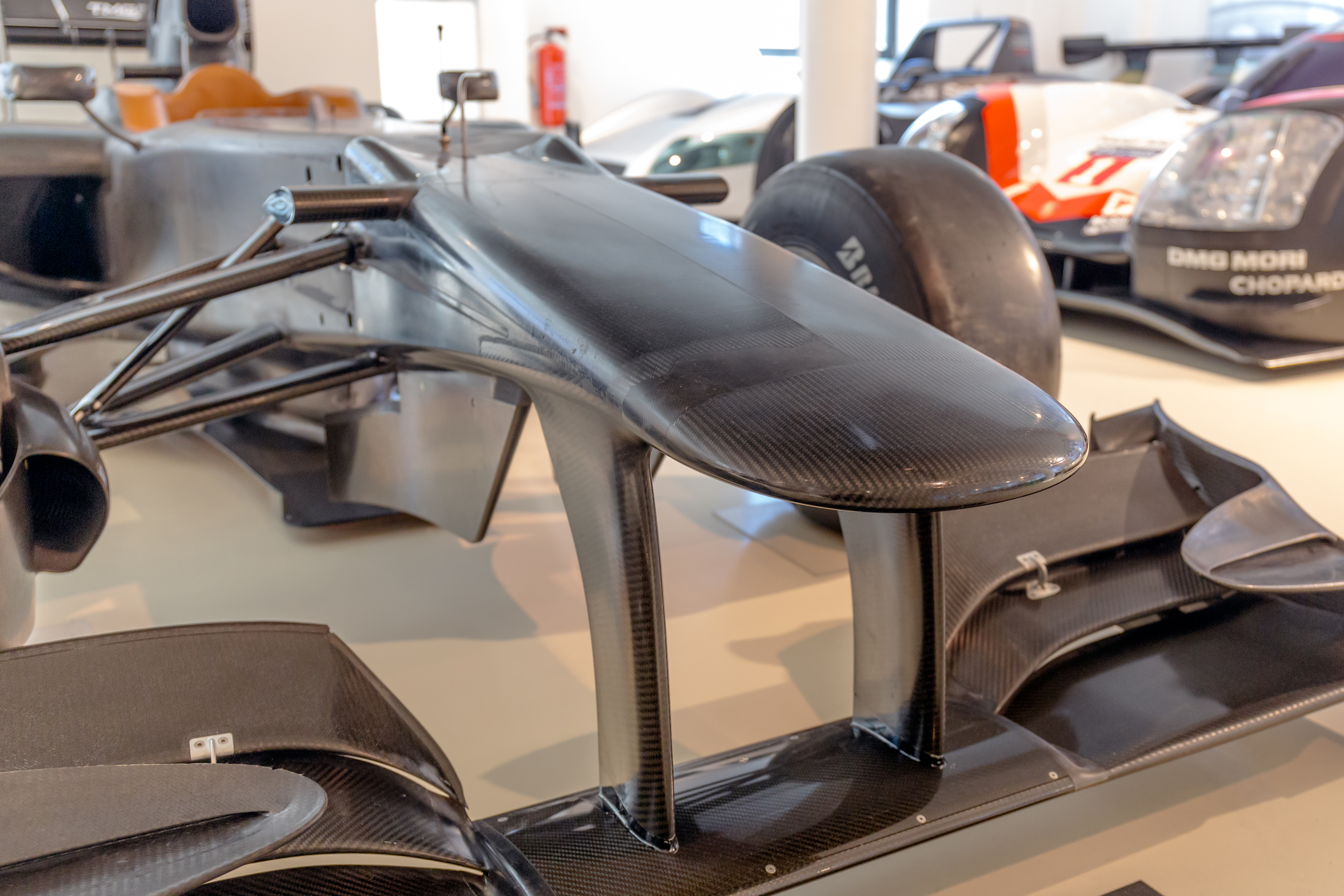
The raised nose of the Toyota TF110.

Aerodynamically, the TF110 is, according to Vasselon, an evolution of the Toyota TF109. It features a double diffuser at the rear, described as extreme by Vasselon and considered the most advanced of its time. The diffuser includes small winglets around the brake ducts and deflectors on its upper section. Designed by Italian engineer Giuseppe Azzollini, this double diffuser was later adopted by the Ferrari F10 after Azzollini joined Scuderia Ferrari following Toyota’s withdrawal. At the front, the TF110’s highly raised nose optimizes airflow around the car, a design later mimicked by the Sauber C29.

The suspension system follows a conventional design with double wishbones molded in carbon fiber, featuring push-rods and a rocker with a torsion bar. The innovation lies in the use of a Cambridge inerter, tested on the TF109 late in the 2009 season, along with the rear suspension wishbones. Toyota also raised the lower suspension wishbones and reduced the gap between them, improving the elasto-kinematics of the axles while making the suspension less rigid. The dampers were supplied by Öhlins.

=== Performance estimates ===
According to former Toyota driver Timo Glock, virtual data collected during the TF110’s development suggested Toyota could have competed for the championship. Glock stated, "engineers who moved from Toyota to Ferrari told me that when Toyota left Formula One, our aerodynamic points were ahead of Ferrari’s," which won five Grands Prix in 2010. Having spent significant time in the simulator developing the TF110, Glock noted that the car was tailored to his driving style and believed he could have won races or contended for the world championship.

Regarding the TF110’s aerodynamic performance, Pascal Vasselon said: "When we stopped development, we had 20 to 30 additional downforce points. We exceeded our targets by far. Even the TF109 was good enough for podiums. Several of our aerodynamicists joined top teams, and we know our downforce data was very high." He added that Toyota planned to introduce a blown diffuser for the first Grand Prix of 2010, claiming Toyota and Red Bull Racing would have been the first to use this technology.

=== Shakedown ===
In May 2010, Japanese driver Kazuki Nakajima conducted a shakedown of the TF110, painted red in the colors of Stefan GP, in the parking lot of Toyota Motorsport’s Cologne factory, in the presence of British and Japanese motorsport journalists.

== Attempts to acquire the car by other teams ==
=== Stefan Grand Prix ===
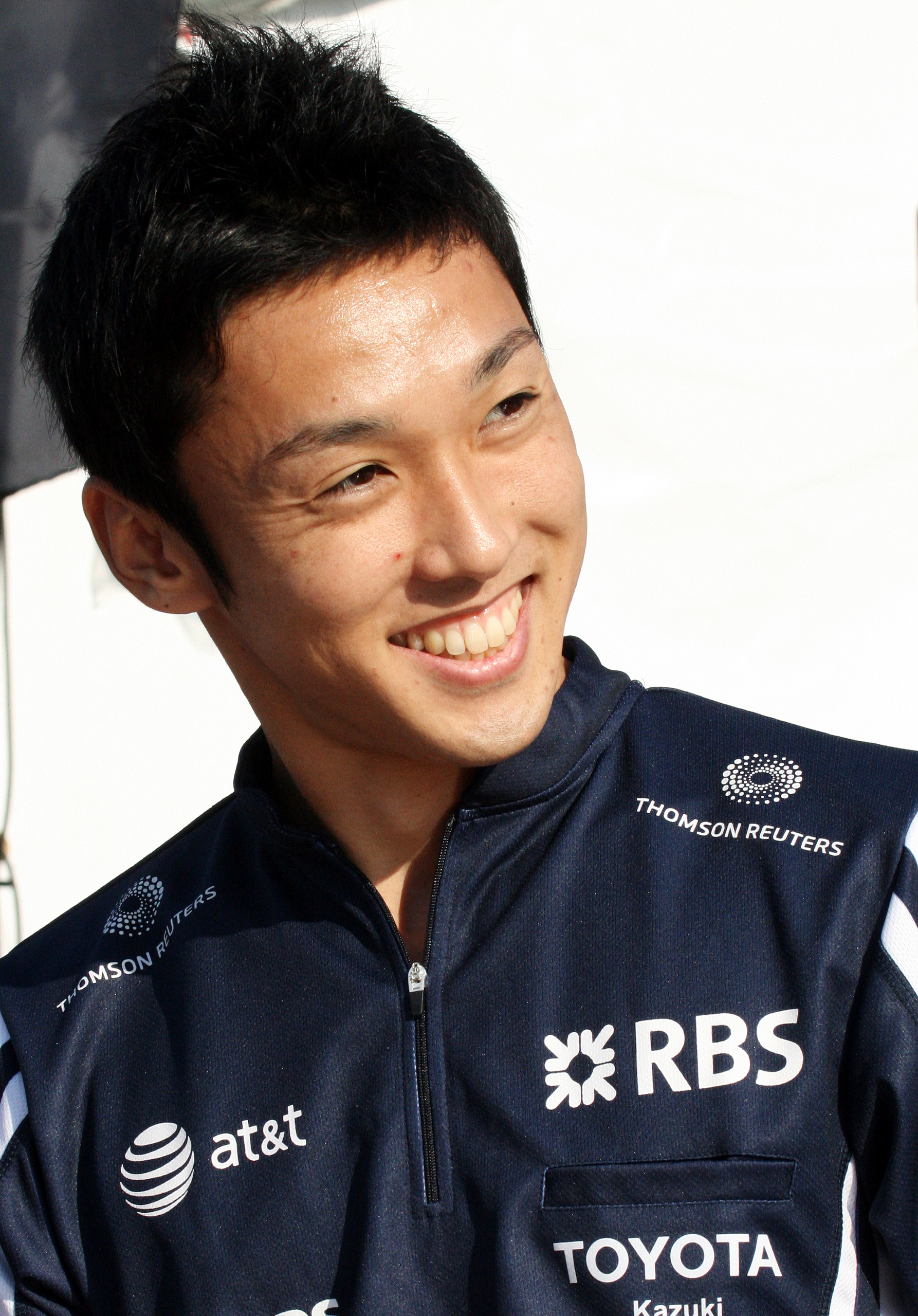
Japanese driver Kazuki Nakajima (pictured in 2009), supported by Toyota, was set to drive the TF110 for the Serbian Stefan GP team.

Toyota’s withdrawal left a vacant 13th grid slot for the 2010 season, ultimately awarded to Sauber. However, the potential withdrawal of new teams like Campos Racing, Manor Motorsport, USF1, and Lotus Racing gave hope to the Serbian Stefan GP, which sought to join the championship despite not being selected in the FIA’s July 2009 tender. In December 2009, Serbian businessman Zoran Stefanovic, founder of Stefan GP, announced an agreement with Toyota to take over its Formula One program after meeting John Howett, head of Toyota Motorsport, in Cologne. Stefanovic claimed to have facilities in Serbia and Germany to support the project and planned to conduct tests throughout 2010 for a potential 2011 entry. Stefan GP also hired British engineer Mike Coughlan as technical director.

In late December 2009, the Stefan S-01, based on or identical to the Toyota TF110, passed the FIA’s mandatory crash tests, though the rear needed to be lightened.

On January 29, 2010, Stefan GP signed a partnership with Toyota, including technological support, use of the Cologne factory, the TF110, its engine (rebadged as Stefan RG-01), and gearbox. The deal also included Kazuki Nakajima, with Toyota covering his salary.

In early February, Bernie Ecclestone, the commercial rights holder of Formula One, supported Stefan GP’s entry, expressing doubts about USF1 and Campos Racing’s participation. Despite not being officially entered, Stefanovic sent equipment to Bahrain and Malaysia, the first two races of the season. The team also held discussions with drivers such as Sébastien Loeb, Narain Karthikeyan, Ralf Schumacher (backed by Ecclestone), Takuma Sato, Christian Klien, Karun Chandhok, Bertrand Baguette, Adrián Vallés, and Alex Margaritis for the second seat. The most serious candidates were Jacques Villeneuve, who had a seat fitting in Cologne, and Pastor Maldonado, considered for a test and reserve role.

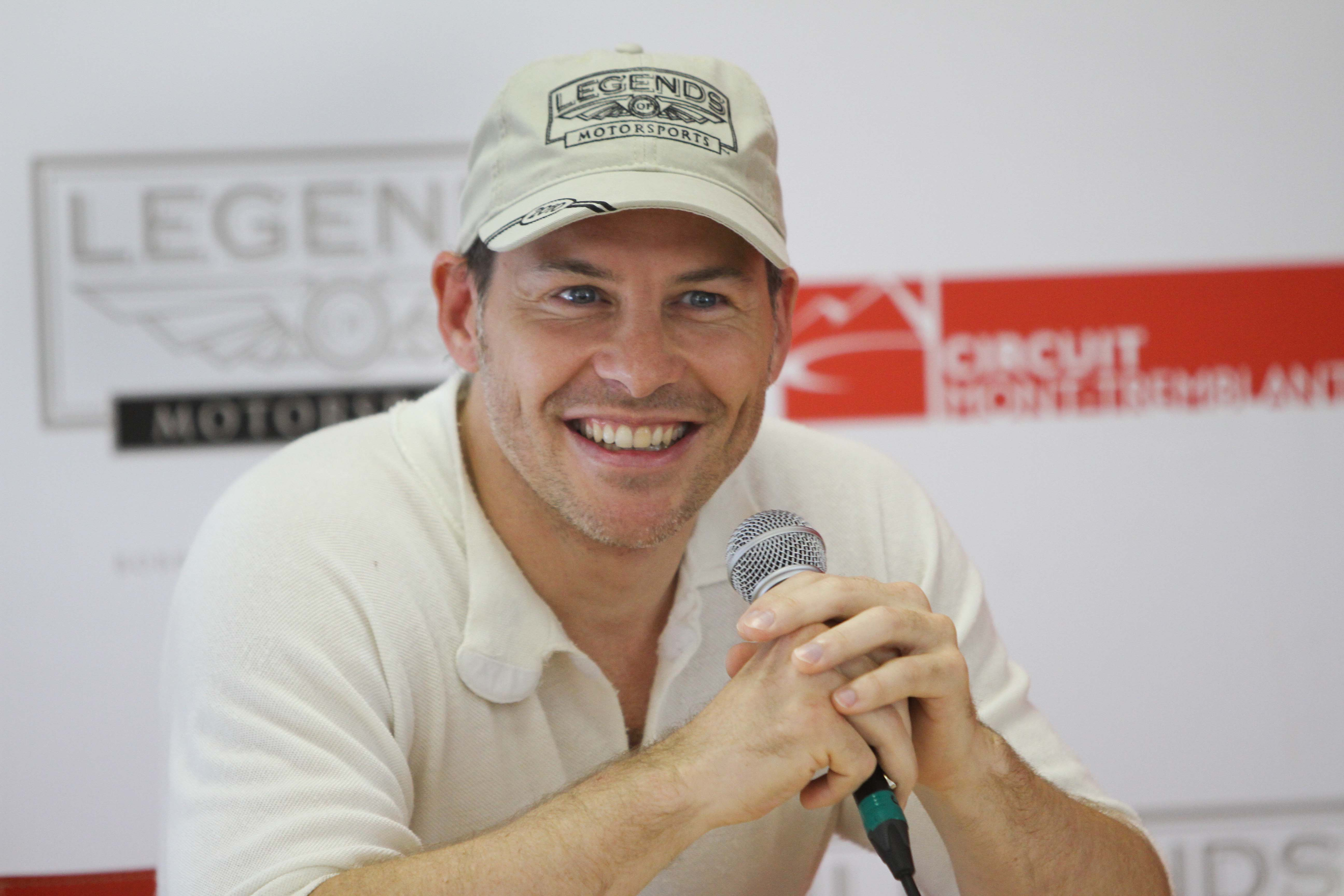
1997 Formula One World Champion Jacques Villeneuve (pictured in 2010) was the most likely candidate to drive the second Stefan S-01.

On February 19, 2010, at 8:00 AM, the Stefan S-01 was started in Cologne. Stefanovic stated, "the car works perfectly, there were no issues, and we could race or test on a track, but we’re just waiting for the tires." However, Bridgestone, the official Formula One tire supplier, only provided tires to registered teams, forcing Stefan GP to use GP2 Series tires.

The S-01, painted entirely red in Serbia’s colors, was scheduled for four days of testing from February 25 to 28 at the Portimão circuit in Portugal. However, three days prior, Stefan GP canceled the test due to the lack of Formula One-spec tires and safety concerns with using GP2 tires.

In late February, Stefanovic revealed negotiations for a merger with USF1, which had requested to delay its entry until the 2010 Spanish Grand Prix, the fifth race, but these talks failed.

On March 3, the FIA released the official 2010 Formula One entry list: USF1 withdrew due to insufficient funds, and Stefan GP was not selected, as a new tender was required for a replacement team.

Shortly after, Stefanovic announced the termination of the Toyota partnership, which was contingent on Stefan GP’s championship participation. Toyota also expressed doubts about the project’s viability: despite Stefan GP’s 60 employees and the 180 staff at Toyota’s Cologne factory, the team was linked to AMCO, a Stefanovic-owned company specializing in aerospace and military technology with a capital of only €500. Stefanovic claimed AMCO supplied drones to the Bundeswehr and collaborated with the European Space Agency on the Ariane 5 launcher, but both entities denied these claims.

=== Durango and Villeneuve Racing ===
In April 2010, the Italian team Durango Automotive, despite withdrawing from the 2010 GP2 Series due to financial issues, responded to the FIA’s tender for a 13th Formula One team for 2011, planning to purchase the Toyota TF110 chassis. In July, Durango partnered with Jacques Villeneuve, the 1997 world champion, forming Villeneuve Racing, with Villeneuve as both driver and team leader. In September 2010, the FIA announced that no candidate met its requirements for joining the championship.

=== Pirelli ===
In June 2010, Italian tire manufacturer Pirelli, selected as the sole Formula One tire supplier for 2011, sought a test and development car. After considering a former BMW Sauber or the Toyota TF110, Pirelli purchased a Toyota TF109, prepared by Toyota Motorsport. To ensure no team gained an advantage, the TF109 was driven by Nick Heidfeld, released from his test driver role at Mercedes.

=== Hispania Racing F1 Team ===
In May 2010, the Spanish team Hispania Racing F1 Team, dissatisfied with its F110 designed by Dallara, ended its partnership with the company. Hispania considered acquiring the TF110’s plans to serve as a basis for a new Cosworth-powered car for 2011. Technical director Geoff Willis and team owner José Ramón Carabante, advised by team principal Colin Kolles, visited Toyota’s Cologne factory twice, eyeing its offices, wind tunnel, machinery, and assembly facilities. However, the deal did not materialize.

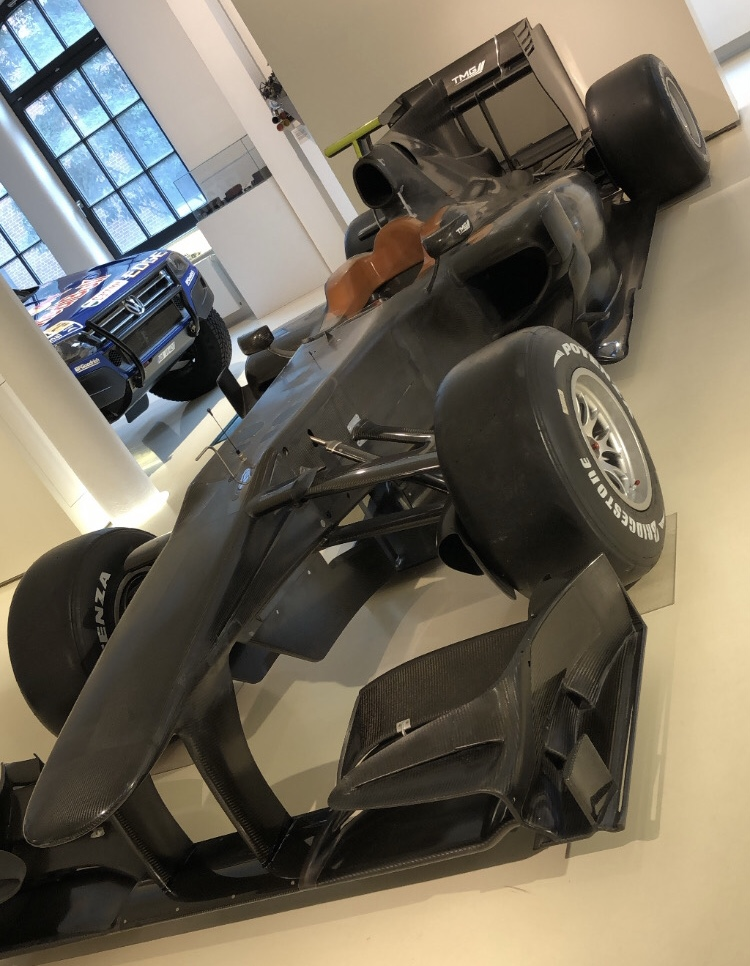
The Toyota TF110-02 on display at the Automuseum Prototyp in Hamburg.

In mid-November 2010, Spanish sports newspaper Marca reported that Hispania was close to finalizing a deal with Toyota Motorsport, including the TF110’s intellectual property, two wind tunnels, and 100 Cologne factory employees. Days later, Toyota unexpectedly terminated negotiations, citing Hispania’s failure to meet contractual obligations, retaining ownership of the TF110. José Ramón Carabante believed a TF110 adapted to 2011 regulations could have placed his drivers in the top eight, but this failed to convince potential Spanish sponsors.

== Fate of the cars ==
Two Toyota TF110 chassis were built. The TF110-01, painted red in Stefan GP colors, was used for a demonstration by Kazuki Nakajima in the Toyota Motorsport Cologne factory parking lot in May 2010. John Howett, the team’s president, damaged it by hitting a wall during a farewell drive. The second chassis, TF110-02, unpainted, is displayed at the Automuseum Prototyp in Hamburg.
