= Toyota TF109 =

Formula One Car for 2009 season

- Jarno Trulli driving the TF109 at the Spanish Grand Prix
- Category: Formula One
- Constructor: Toyota
- Designers: Yoshiaki Kinoshita (Executive Vice President - Technical); Noritoshi Arai (Director Technical Coordination); Pascal Vasselon (Senior General Manager Chassis); Mark Tatham (Chief Designer); Kevin Taylor (Chief Designer - Car Concept); Mark Gillan (Head of Aerodynamics); Jason Somerville (Deputy Head of Aerodynamics); Tim Milne (Double Diffuser, Concept Lead); Kazuo Takeuchi (Engine Director); Hiroshi Yajima (Chief Designer, Engine)
- Predecessor: Toyota TF108
- Successor: Toyota TF110 (never raced)

Technical specifications
- Chassis: Carbon-fibre and honeycomb composite monocoque
- Suspension (front): Independent suspension, pushrod activated torsion springs
- Suspension (rear): As front
- Engine: Toyota RVX-09 2.4L V8, naturally-aspirated, mid-mounted
- Transmission: Toyota 7 forward gears + 1 reverse, semi-automatic
- Power: 740 hp @ 18,000 rpm
- Fuel: Esso
- Lubricants: Esso
- Tyres: Bridgestone

Competition history
- Notable entrants: Panasonic Toyota Racing
- Notable drivers: 9. (Italy) Jarno Trulli; 10. (Germany) Timo Glock; 10. (Japan) Kamui Kobayashi
- Debut: 2009 Australian Grand Prix
- Last event: 2009 Abu Dhabi Grand Prix
Races	Wins	Podiums	Poles	F/Laps
17	0	5	1	2

The Toyota TF109 was a Formula One racing car engineered by Toyota for the 2009 Formula One season. The chassis was designed by Pascal Vasselon, Mark Tatham and Mark Gillan with the engine being designed by Luca Marmorini and Noritoshi Arai overseeing the entire project. It was revealed online on Toyota's official website on 15 January 2009 and made its track debut on 18 January at the Autódromo Algarve. This was the last Formula One car to be developed by Toyota, as after the 2009 Formula One season was completed Toyota Motor Corporation announced their decision to withdraw from Formula One. As far as performance went, the car was extraordinarily inconsistent. It started the season well with three podium finishes in the first four races as it got the jump on rival teams with the "double-decker" diffuser. In the span of only two races however, the TF109 went from locking out the front row in Bahrain to locking out the back row in Monaco. The car from then on was uncompetitive despite a few glimmers of hope in Singapore when Timo Glock finished 2nd and Japan when Jarno Trulli also finished second.

This was the last F1 car to run on Esso fuel along with the Williams FW31 until the McLaren MP4-30 in 2015, as well as last non-British based F1 car to run on Esso until Toro Rosso STR12 in the 2017.

== Pre-season ==
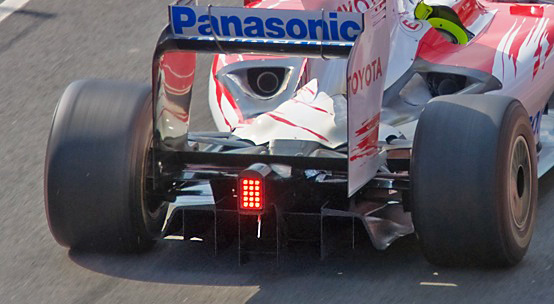
The controversial diffuser of the TF109.

At the Australian Grand Prix and the Malaysian Grand Prix races, an official complaint was launched by other teams against the rear diffusers of the Williams FW31, Toyota TF109 and the Brawn BGP 001 saying that they were illegal, but after analysing the cars the FIA deemed that both cars were legal. Three teams appealed against the decision, and after much deliberating the cars were again deemed to "comply with the applicable regulations" by the FIA.

== Season summary ==
=== Opening rounds: Podiums and front-row lockout ===
During the opening race in Australia, stewards deemed the rear wing of the TF109 to be flexible beyond what is allowed by the 2009 regulations. Both cars were therefore excluded from the qualifying classifications and started the race from the pitlane, fitted with replacement wings. Both cars completed the race, Trulli and Glock crossing the line in third and fifth respectively, however Trulli was given a 25-second penalty for passing Lewis Hamilton during the final safety car period, dropping him to 12th. After further investigation it was discovered that Hamilton had purposely let Trulli through. The penalty given to Trulli was removed and Hamilton subsequently disqualified from the race. Hamilton's removal was based upon misinformation given by the McLaren team during an initial investigation.

In Malaysia, Trulli qualified in second behind Brawn GP's Jenson Button, with Glock starting in third following a penalty applied to Red Bull's Sebastian Vettel. During the race, Trulli momentarily held the lead during the pit stop sequence with Glock running well within top 5. However, the race would eventually be suspended owing to treacherous conditions with half-points being awarded. Glock secured his first podium finish of the year in third, with Trulli finishing fourth, a reverse of their result in Australia.

Glock challenging Ferrari's Kimi Räikkönen for a position during the Chinese Grand Prix.

Sitting second in the Constructors' Championship standings, Toyota heads to China after the FIA deemed the team's diffuser is legal, allowing the results from the previous rounds to stand. But the duo were unable to replicate their pace from Sepang. Trulli could only muster sixth in qualifying, while Glock was knocked out in Q2 in 14th. The German driver was further demoted to 19th for changing his gearbox and eventually needing to start from the pit lane. Under rainy conditions, Glock recovered to finish in seventh while Trulli's afternoon ended earlier following a shunt with BMW Sauber's Robert Kubica on lap 18.

Toyota surprised the grid during the Bahrain Grand Prix with their first front-row lockout in the team's history, with Trulli leading his teammate to pole position just almost three tenths. It was Trulli's first pole position since the 2005 United States Grand Prix (fourth overall) and he admitted the car felt "comfortable" and should be within contention for the race win on Sunday. Toyota looked to dictate the proceedings in a 1–2 formation early in the race, unfortunately Brawn made a correct strategy call that allowed Button to win the race with Trulli in bitter third and Glock in seventh once more. A disappointed Trulli blamed oil spillage and the lack of pace with the soft tyres when chasing Vettel for second.

=== European rounds: Inconsistent performance ===
It became apparent that during the Spanish Grand Prix qualifying, the TF109 has become somewhat inconsistent with Glock and Trulli in sixth and seventh, respectively. During the race, Trulli retired after triggering a multi-car collision that eliminated four cars from the race. Glock crossed the line in 10th, marking Toyota's first scoreless race of the year.

The team's Senior General Manager Chassis Pascal Vasselon was bullish about the TF109's performance as it prepares to take on the Monaco Grand Prix, with gradual updates planned and the drivers eager to recover from the poor result in Barcelona. The qualifying session turned out to be the one to forget for the team as both cars were firmly placed at the back of the grid. Trulli started the race from 18th with Glock from the pit lane following changes to the setup and suspension. The team opted for Glock to run a heavy load of fuel to minimise stops and gain track positions. Glock's strategy, albeit paying off, was ultimately not enough to score as he crossed the line in 10th once more and Trulli in 13th.

Trulli managed to qualify fifth for the Turkish Grand Prix, but Glock's qualifying woes continue with him starting 13th. On Sunday, Toyota finally returned to the scoring column with Trulli taking fourth and Glock in eighth.

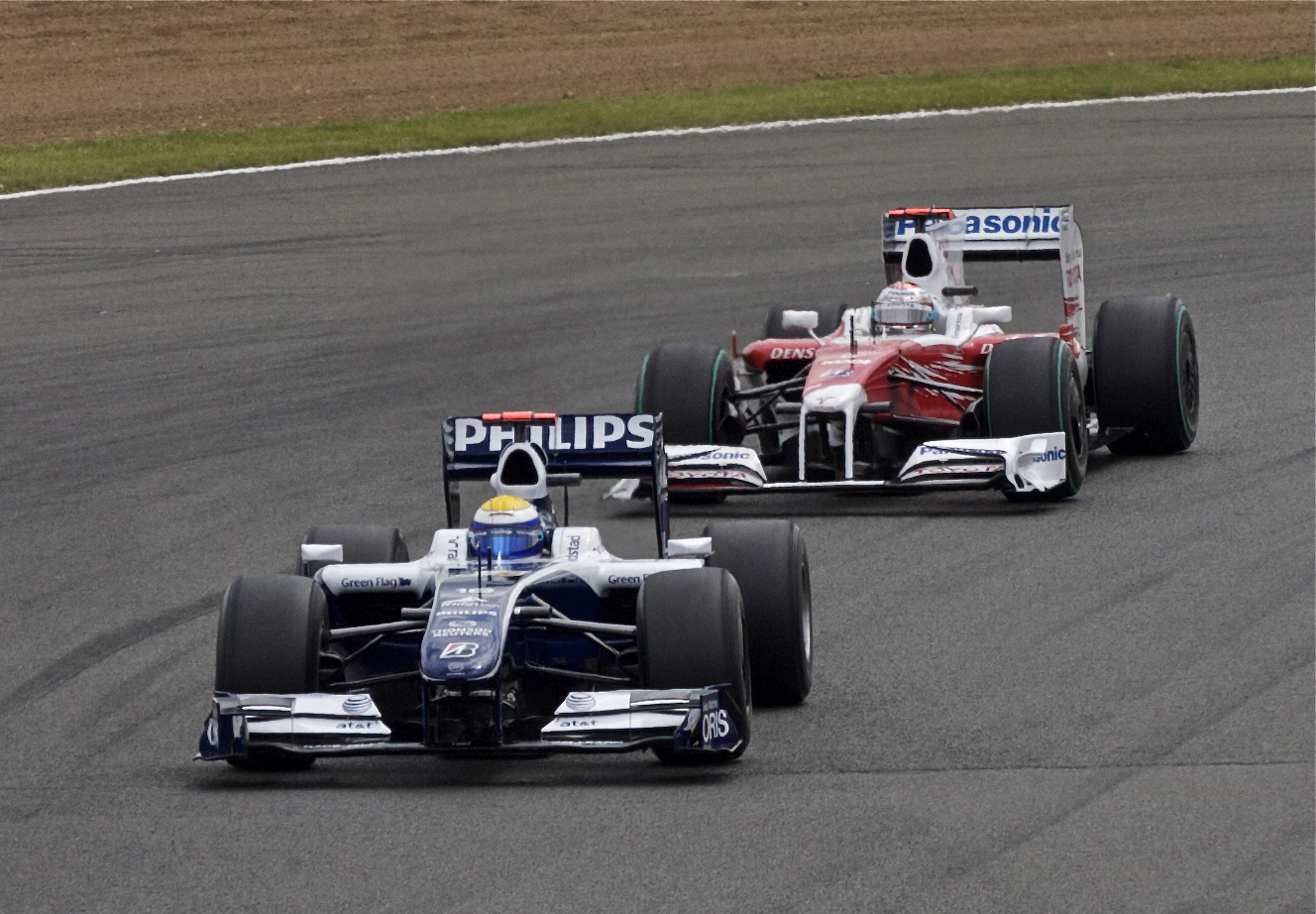
Trulli battling Williams' Nico Rosberg during the British Grand Prix, where he eventually finished seventh — his best finish during the difficult European stretch.

Toyota introduced aerodynamic upgrades ahead of the British Grand Prix with seemingly decent prospects for the race with Trulli in fourth and Glock in eighth during qualifying. During the weekend, the team crossed their 4,000-lap mark in Silverstone, despite it has traditionally not been a happy hunting ground for the team. Trulli managed to come home in seventh and Glock losing out on the final scoring position to Räikkönen with less than a second behind.

Ahead of the German Grand Prix, Francesco Nenci, Glock's race engineer departed the team due to a reported disagreements with Toyota's technical management, Juan Pablo Ramirez taking over the post vacated by Nenci. The qualifying slump continues with the home hero qualifying 19th on the grid before being demoted to the rear end of the field after obstructing Renault's Fernando Alonso in qualifying. Trulli was not any better with only 14th. Both drivers left the Nürburgring empty-handed despite Glock had a respectable recovery to finish ninth.

Toyota wrapped up the first half of the season with both Glock and Trulli in the points during in Hungary, albeit the team slipping to third in the Constructors' Championship standings after Räikkönen took second for Ferrari.

=== Post-summer break rounds: Continued struggles ===
Following the summer break, Toyota heads to Valencia where they saw both drivers failing to advance to Q3. Trulli was knocked out earlier in 18th after struggling with pace, while Glock qualified in 13th. Both drivers went home scoreless once again with the only consoling result being Glock's fastest lap of the race on lap 55.

Toyota introduced upgrades ahead of the Belgian and the Italian rounds with revised front and rear wings along with other aerodynamic changes due to the tracks requiring low downforce, with Vasselon commenting that the team will take all the necessary step to ensure the TF109 has more relative pace during the race over qualifying.

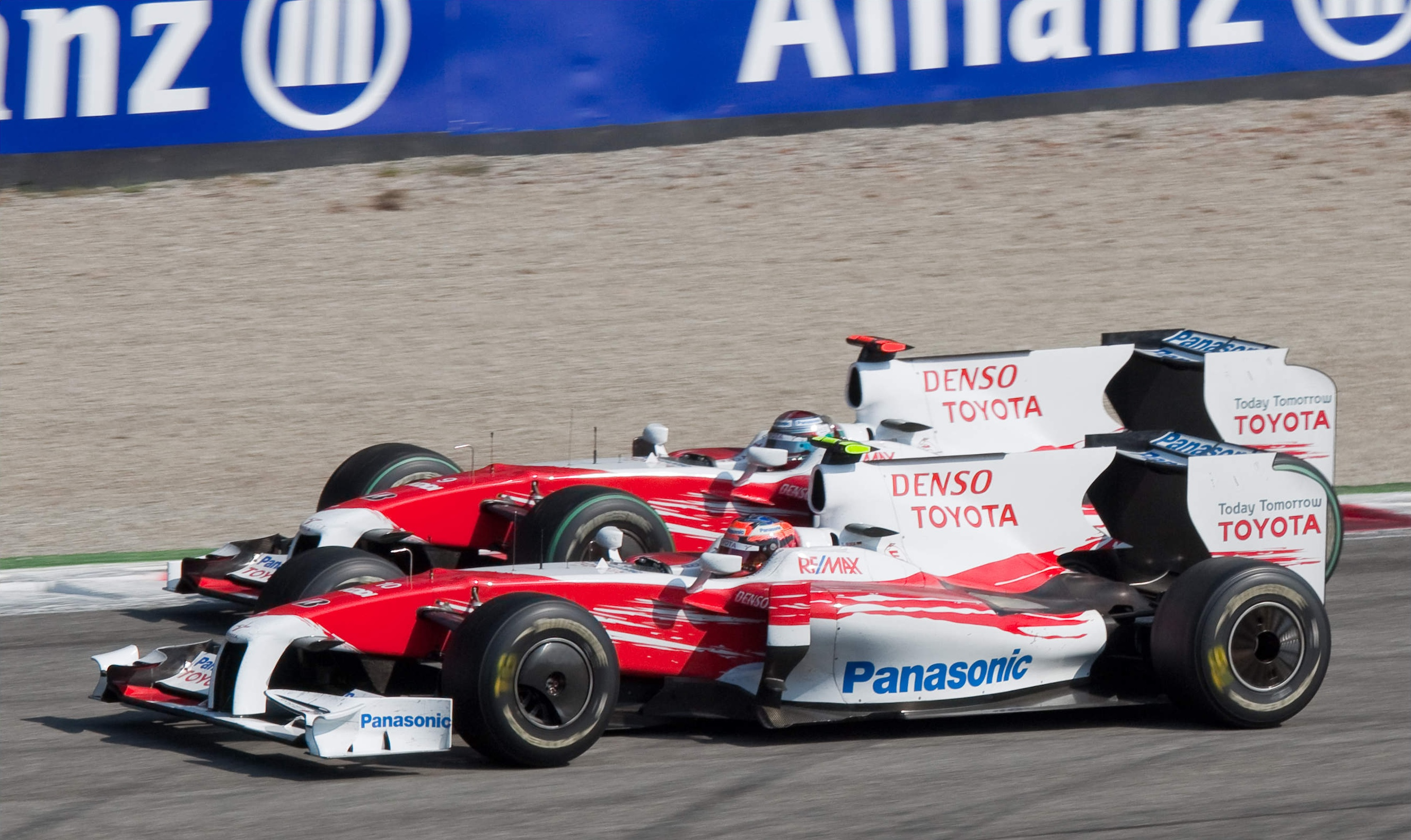
Trulli battling teammate Glock during the Italian Grand Prix.

During qualifying in Spa-Francorchamps, Force India driver Giancarlo Fisichella took an unprecedented pole position, with Trulli starting alongside while Glock in seventh. After qualifying it was discovered that Fisichella ran on lighter fuel load, with outlets such as BBC Sport tipping that Trulli is well in the contention for the team's first victory. Yet, Trulli's race ended on lap 21 after suffering an issue with brakes following a first-lap incident, and Glock failed to score by finishing 10th.

Neither Trulli nor Glock were able to advance to Q3 in the former's home race, the Italian Grand Prix, after qualifying in 11th and 16th, respectively. Glock struggled with the lack of pace, which also plagued customer team Williams' Kazuki Nakajima and Rosberg. Both drivers finished the race outside the points despite momentarily engaged in a battle with one another.

=== Closing rounds: Final podiums, Kobayashi's debut, and departure from Formula One ===
After a very difficult European stretch, Toyota returned to the podium in Singapore with Glock finishing second behind Hamilton after starting from seventh. He overtook his teammate for ninth in the Drivers' Championship after Trulli endured another scoreless weekend.

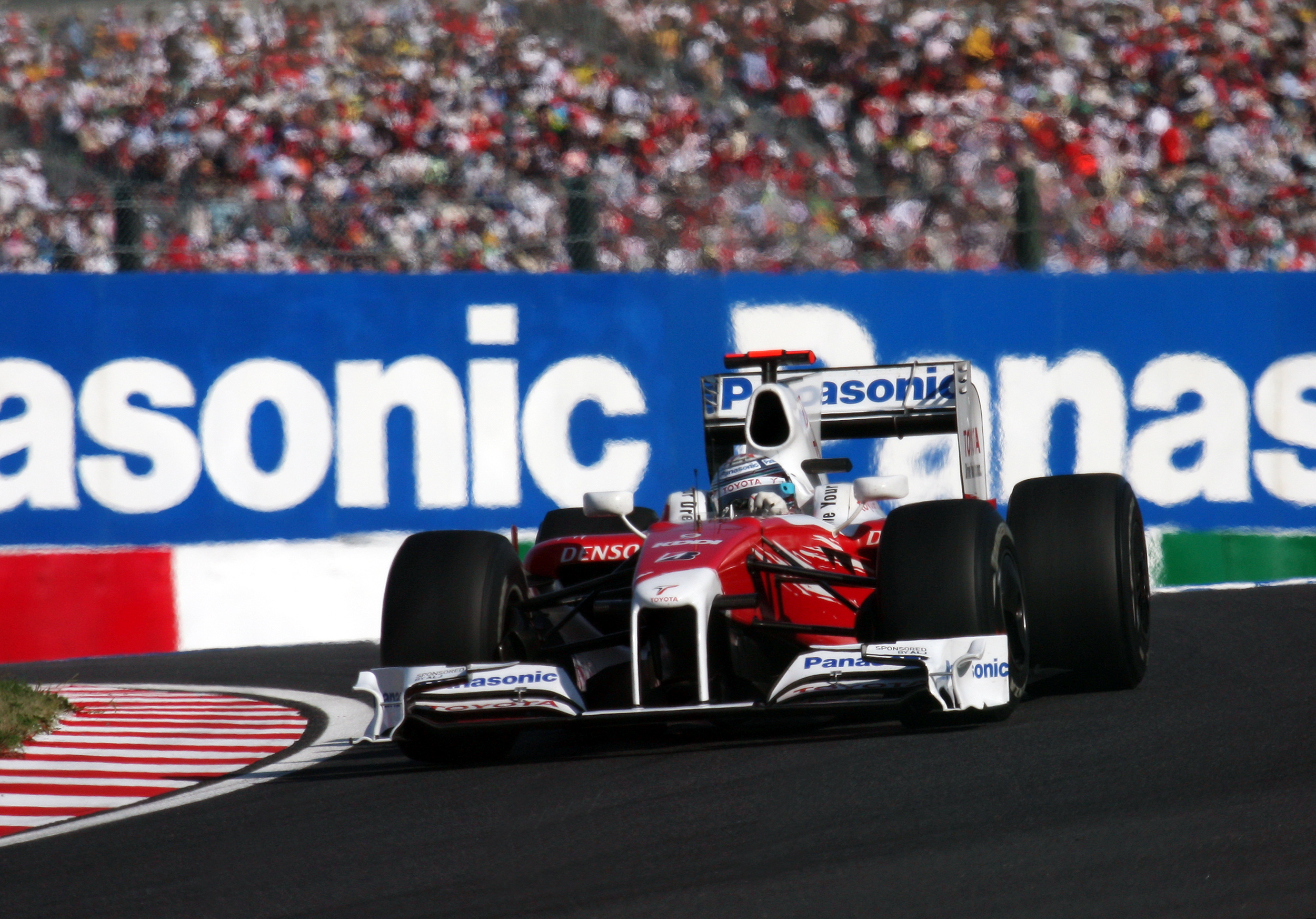
Trulli's second place in Japan is Toyota's last Formula One podium.

The Friday practice sessions in Japan were dominated by heavy rain that severely reduced running time. Glock did not drive as he was suffering from a fever and was replaced by GP2 Series and test driver Kamui Kobayashi. Glock's short cameo in qualifying was cut short after a serious crash, but the stewards rejected Toyota's proposal to have Kobayashi replace him as he did not take part in the Saturday session. Trulli qualified in second and would finish the race in second in front of Toyota's home fans, which became his and the team's final Formula One podium. It was the last time an Italian driver stood on the podium before Mercedes' Kimi Antonelli broke the streak during the 2025 Canadian Grand Prix.

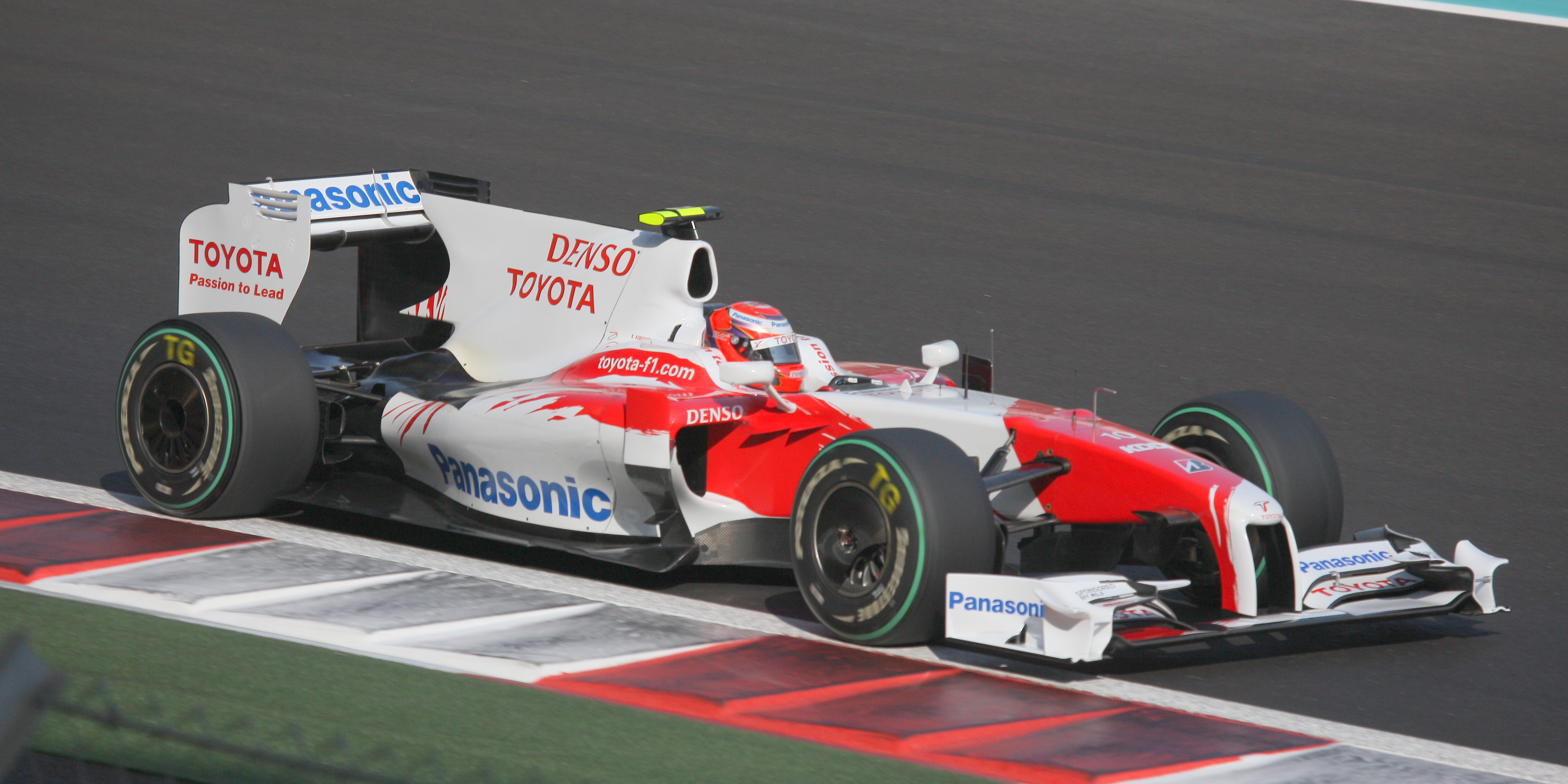
Kobayashi scored his first Formula One career points during the Abu Dhabi Grand Prix, which turned out to be Toyota's last Formula One race.

What initially thought to be minor cut to his leg during his Suzuka crash becomes a worse problem for Glock after the medical team assessed that he has a cracked vertebra. He was ruled out from the Brazilian Grand Prix, with Kobayashi taking his spot. Trulli managed to qualify in strong fourth place with Kobayashi earning a respectable 11th on his first qualifying. Trulli retired on the first lap after a first lap collision with Adrian Sutil that left both drivers fuming. The former was fined £6,000 for failing to leave the track as required and confronting Sutil in an aggressive manner. Kobayashi drove an aggressive race and taking out Nakajima in the process, and narrowly miss out on scoring points on his debut outing.

During the inaugural Abu Dhabi Grand Prix, Toyota confirmed that Glock will not return to the cockpit, with Kobayashi driving in his place for the season finale. The team concluded their season with Kobayashi scoring his first points in sixth with Trulli behind. Toyota is classified fifth in the Constructors' Championship standings with 59.5 points, 10.5 points behind Ferrari, but ahead of BMW Sauber with 36 points.

On 4 November, Toyota announced that they will depart from Formula One citing "economic environment", with Toyota president Akio Toyoda adding that the decision would have stand even if the team took a win that season. Prior to their departure, Toyota was already developing their challenger for the 2010 season with the TF110, with the team believing that the succeeding car would have fought for podiums early on.

== Later uses ==
The No. 10 TF109 on display at the Louwman Museum in 2017.

The tyre manufacturer Pirelli used the TF109 chassis in 2010–2011 as a test car in tyre development. Nick Heidfeld, Pedro de la Rosa, Romain Grosjean and Lucas di Grassi tested the tires before it returned to the sport in 2011. The Renault R30 replaced the TF109 as Pirelli's test car in 2012.

== Complete Formula One results ==
(key) (results in bold indicate pole position; results in italics indicate fastest lap)

Year	Entrant	Engine	Tyres	Drivers	1	2	3	4	5	6	7	8	9	10	11	12	13	14	15	16	17	Points	WCC
2009	Panasonic Toyota Racing	Toyota RVX-09 V8	**B**		AUS	MAL	CHN	BHR	ESP	MON	TUR	GBR	GER	HUN	EUR	BEL	ITA	SIN	JPN	BRA	ABU	59.5	5th
2009	Panasonic Toyota Racing	Toyota RVX-09 V8	**B**	(Italy) Jarno Trulli	3	4^{‡}	Ret	**3**	Ret	13	4	7	17	8	13	Ret	14	12	2	Ret	7	59.5	5th
2009	Panasonic Toyota Racing	Toyota RVX-09 V8	**B**	(Germany) Timo Glock	4	3^{‡}	7	7	10	10	8	9	9	6	14	10	11	2	DNS			59.5	5th
2009	Panasonic Toyota Racing	Toyota RVX-09 V8	**B**	(Japan) Kamui Kobayashi															PO	9	6	59.5	5th

^{‡} Half points awarded as less than 75% of race distance completed.
