= Toyota TF107 =

2007 Formula One season car

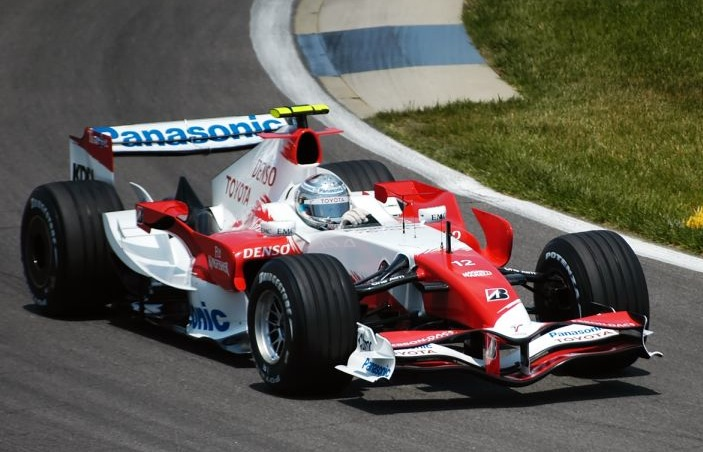
- Jarno Trulli driving the TF107 at the 2007 United States Grand Prix
- Category: Formula One
- Constructor: Toyota
- Designers: Yoshiaki Kinoshita (Executive Vice President - Technical); Noritoshi Arai (Director Technical Coordination); Pascal Vasselon (Senior General Manager Chassis); Mark Tatham (Chief Designer); David Neilsen (Chief Designer - Car Concept); Olivier Hulot (Head of Electronics); Mark Gillan (Head of Aerodynamics); Jason Somerville (Deputy Head of Aerodynamics); Luca Marmorini (Engine Director); Hiroshi Yajima (Chief Designer, Engine)
- Predecessor: TF106
- Successor: TF108

Technical specifications
- Chassis: carbon-fibre and honeycomb composite monocoque
- Suspension (front): Zero-keel Double wishbone, carbon fiber pushrod & trackrod actuated coil springs over Penske dampers.
- Suspension (rear): Double wishbone, carbon fiber toe link and pushrod over Penske dampers.
- Length: 4,530 mm (178.3 in)
- Width: 1,800 mm (70.9 in)
- Height: 950 mm (37.4 in)
- Wheelbase: 3,090 mm (121.7 in)
- Engine: Toyota RVX-07 2,398 cc (2 L) V8 (90°) naturally aspirated, mid-engine, longitudinally-mounted
- Transmission: Toyota 7-speed "Seamless shift"
- Power: 750 hp @ 19,000 rpm
- Fuel: Esso
- Lubricants: Esso
- Brakes: Brembo Hitco carbon-carbon calipers & Brembo master cylinders
- Tyres: Bridgestone Potenza, BBS forged magnesium wheels

Competition history
- Notable entrants: Panasonic Toyota Racing
- Notable drivers: 11. (Germany) Ralf Schumacher; 12. (Italy) Jarno Trulli
- Debut: 2007 Australian Grand Prix
- Last event: 2007 Brazilian Grand Prix
Races	Wins	Poles	F/Laps
17	0	0	0
- Constructors' Championships: 0
- Drivers' Championships: 0

The Toyota TF107 is the car with which the Toyota team competed in the 2007 Formula One season. It was revealed in Cologne on 12 January, prior to an exhaustive testing regime.

The chassis was designed by Pascal Vasselon, Mark Tatham and Mark Gillan with the engine being designed by Luca Marmorini and Noritoshi Arai overseeing the entire project.

== Aerodynamics ==
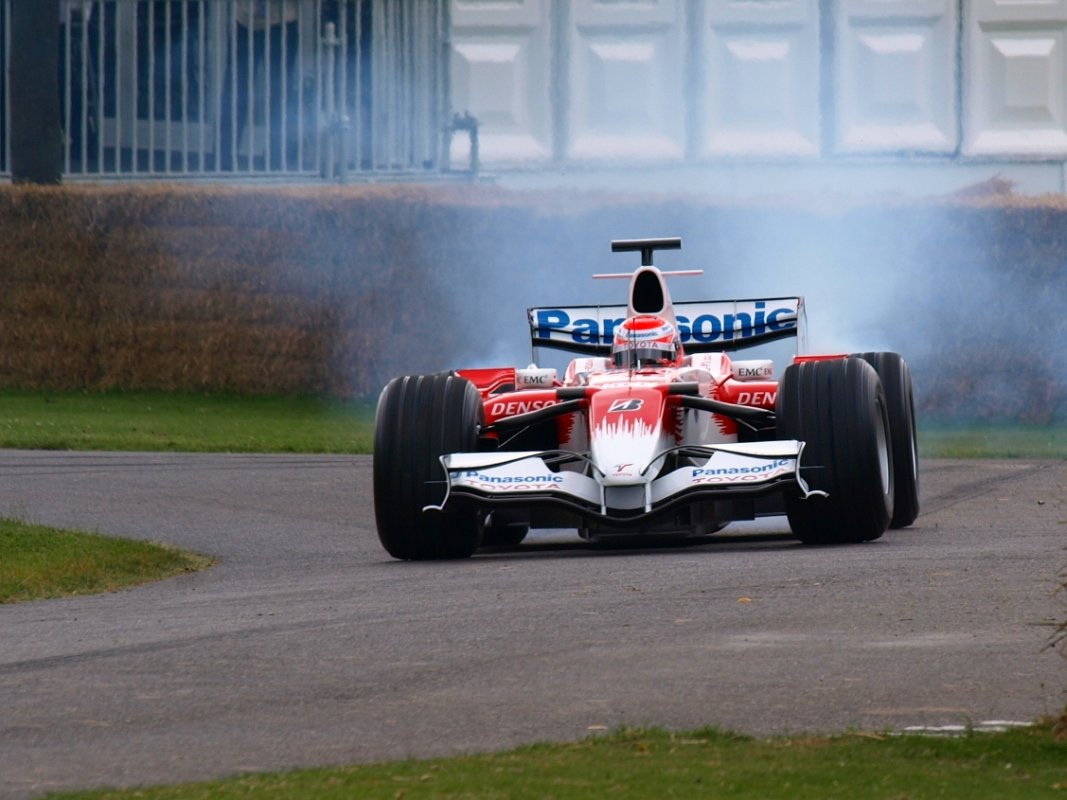
Kamui Kobayashi driving a TF107 at Goodwood in 2008

The main changes in comparison to its predecessor, the TF106B were aerodynamic. The position of the engine was moved forward by 100 mm, meaning that the chassis tub was shorter. This was achieved by reshaping the monocoque, and did not incur a reduction in size of the fuel tank.

The area below the nose of the car was clear of intrusion from suspension components due to the "zero keel" design. In fact at the front of the car, the monocoque was 30mm higher than on the TF106B, which resulted in dramatically sloped suspension wishbones. Although this approach compromised the front suspension geometry possibilities, the Toyota engineers came to the conclusion that this was not a problem.

== Engine and gearbox ==
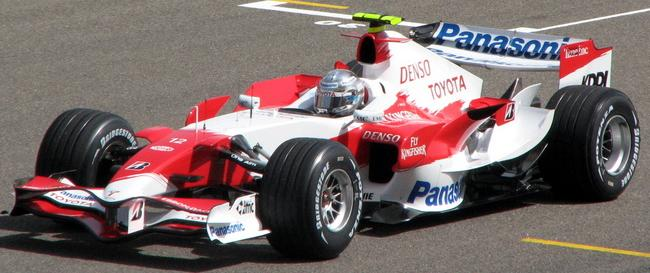
Jarno Trulli driving the TF107 at the 2007 Bahrain Grand Prix.

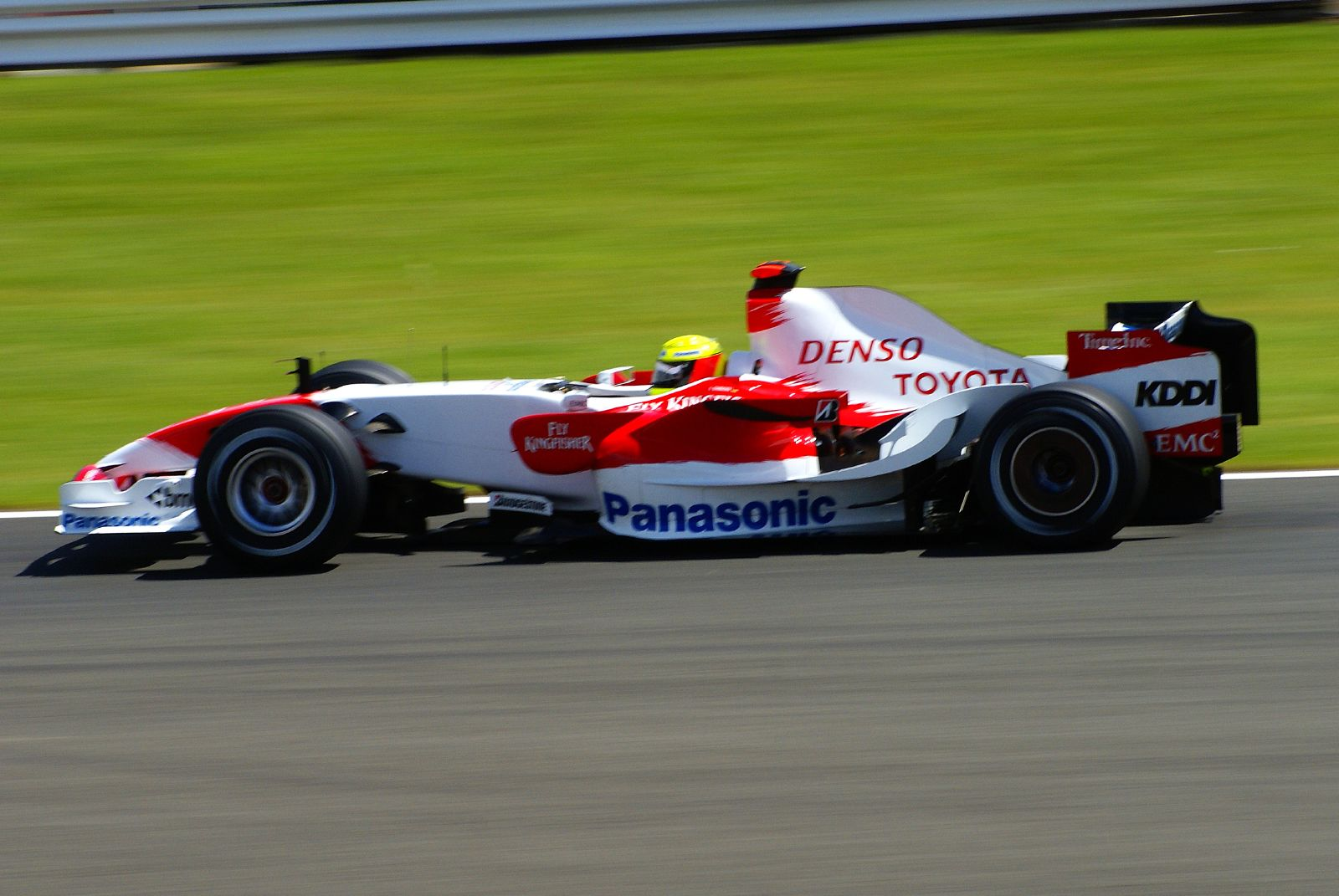
Ralf Schumacher at the 2007 British GP.

Owing to the new homologation rules on engines imposed by the FIA, the engine (called the RVX-07) was based on that used by Jarno Trulli in the 2006 Japanese and Brazilian Grands Prix. Only limited changes from this design were allowed, in order to optimise performance for the 19000 rpm rev limit which was enforced in 2007. Several changes were made to the pistons and valves and other components, although the engine block could not be changed.

In 2007, the WilliamsF1 team used Toyota engines as a customer team. As part of this partnership, Toyota used a new gearbox developed in collaboration with Williams, which used seamless shift technology.

Only the gearbox internals were shared with the Williams's 2007 car, the FW29, the TF107's gearbox casing being made by Toyota.

== Performance ==
The car was less successful than the previous year's TF106, which managed 35 points in the season. The TF107's 13 points were amassed with seven points scoring finishes, including two 6th places, one for Jarno Trulli at the 2007 United States Grand Prix and one for Ralf Schumacher in Hungary. Trulli scored points on three other occasions, with Schumacher finishing in the points in two other races. By the end of the season, the team embarrassingly scored less points than WilliamsF1 who have the same engine as them in the Constructors' Championship. Ralf Schumacher did not have his contract renewed. He was replaced by fellow German driver Timo Glock for the 2008 season.

The car's best qualifying position was in the hands of Ralf Schumacher, who took 5th place in Hungary. It made the top ten 20 times out of a possible 34.

== Drivers' helmets ==
At the Canadian Grand Prix, Jarno Trulli wore a pink helmet to honour his friend Danilo di Luca, who won the 2007 Giro d'Italia cycling race. Trulli was also wearing the Giro d'Italia winner's pink jersey. The pink helmet had a picture of his friend di Luca on it.

== Complete Formula One results ==
(key) (results in bold indicate pole position)

Year	Team	Engine	Tyres	Drivers	1	2	3	4	5	6	7	8	9	10	11	12	13	14	15	16	17	Points	WCC
2007	Toyota	Toyota V8	**B**		AUS	MAL	BHR	ESP	MON	CAN	USA	FRA	GBR	EUR	HUN	TUR	ITA	BEL	JPN	CHN	BRA	**13**	**6th**
2007	Toyota	Toyota V8	**B**	(Germany) Ralf Schumacher	8	15	12	Ret	16	8	Ret	10	Ret	Ret	6	12	15	10	Ret	Ret	11	**13**	**6th**
2007	Toyota	Toyota V8	**B**	(Italy) Jarno Trulli	9	7	7	Ret	15	Ret	6	Ret	Ret	13	10	16	11	11	13	13	8	**13**	**6th**
