= Mark Tatham =

British engineer

- Born: Mark Osbourne Tatham; April 1964 (age 62)
- Occupation: Engineer
- Years active: 1994–2025
- Known for: Formula One Engineer

Mark Osbourne Tatham (born April 1964) is a retired British Formula One and motorsports engineer. He is best known for being the Technical Director at Lola Cars, and Chief Designer for Scuderia Toro Rosso, Lotus Racing and Toyota Racing Formula One teams.

== Career ==
Tatham studied engineering science at the University of Exeter before completing an MSc in Automotive Engineering at Cranfield University. He began his motorsport career in the early 1990s at Xtrac, where he worked on the design and development of racing transmission systems used in categories including rallycross, touring cars, IndyCar and Formula One. He subsequently joined Tyrrell Racing Formula One team in 1994 as a design engineer, overseeing suspension design and mechanical development while supporting R&D and test programmes.

In 1996, Tatham moved to Williams Racing as a senior design engineer and quickly progressed to be Head of Mechanical Design. During nearly a decade with the team he led design work across major mechanical areas of the car, including suspension systems and advanced development projects, working closely with aerodynamics, vehicle dynamics and track engineering groups to deliver integrated chassis solutions. From 2006 to 2009 he served as Project Leader for Chassis at Toyota Racing, holding technical responsibility for the design and development of the Toyota TF107 and Toyota TF109 Formula One cars.

Tatham then went into engineering consulting, and was contracted to be the chief designer of the chassis for the newly established Lotus Racing team. In 2012 he briefly became Chief Designer of the HRT Formula 1 Team, where he was responsible for establishing the design office and leading development of the planned 2013 car before the team collapsed. Between 2013 and 2015 he worked at McLaren Racing as Design Team Leader for the Honda/McLaren Energy Storage System, coordinating the design and integration of the high-power battery system for the 2015 Formula One power unit programme.

In July 2015, Tatham then moved to Scuderia Toro Rosso as Chief Designer – Mechanical and Systems, leading engineers responsible for the car’s mechanical architecture. He departed the team in March 2018, and was then contracted to become Chief Engineer for the Glickenhaus SCG 007 LMH, overseeing all technical aspects of the clean-sheet design that competed in the FIA World Endurance Championship.

He subsequently became Technical Director at Lola Cars, where he led the re-establishment of the company’s engineering capability and directed projects including the Lola T001 Formula E car. Tatham has since returned to motorsports consultancy.
