= Toyota TF106 =

Formula One Car for 2006 season

Toyota TF106 Toyota TF106B
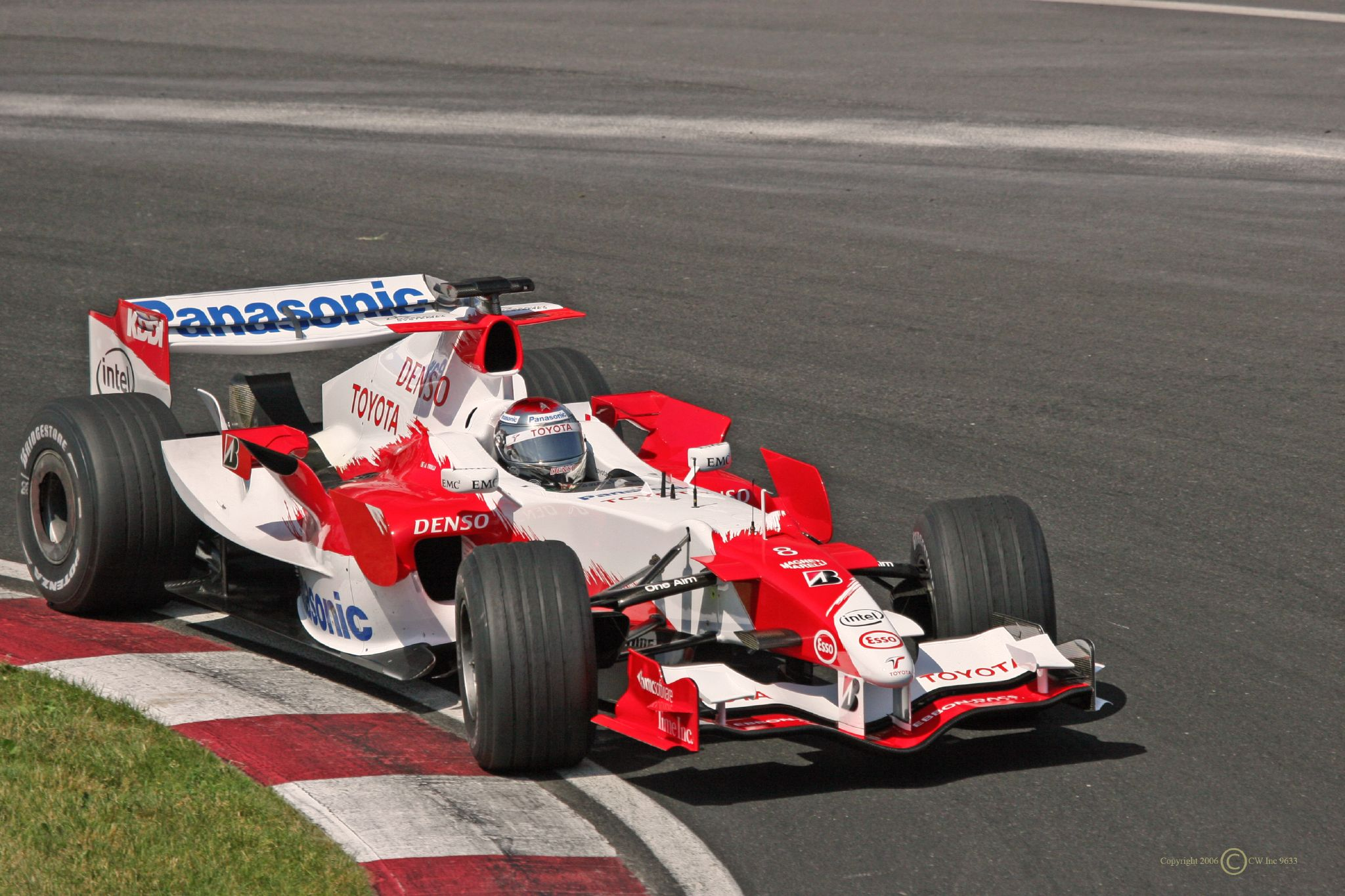
- Jarno Trulli driving the TF106B at the 2006 Canadian Grand Prix
- Category: Formula One
- Constructor: Toyota
- Designers: Yoshiaki Kinoshita (Executive Vice President - Technical); Mike Gascoyne (Technical Director); John Litjens (Chief Designer); David Neilsen (Chief Designer - Car Concept); Olivier Hulot (Head of Electronics); Nicolò Petrucci (Head of Aerodynamics); Luca Marmorini (Engine Director); Hiroshi Yajima (Chief Designer, Engine)
- Predecessor: TF105
- Successor: TF107

Technical specifications
- Chassis: Moulded carbon-fibre and honeycomb construction
- Suspension (front): Carbon-fibre double wishbone arrangement, with carbon-fibre trackrod and pushrod
- Suspension (rear): Carbon-fibre double wishbone arrangement, with carbon-fibre trackrod and pushrod
- Engine: Toyota RVX-06, 2.4-litre V8 naturally-aspirated mid-engined
- Transmission: Toyota/Xtrac 7 forward + 1 reverse sequential
- Power: 745 hp @ 19,000 rpm
- Fuel: Esso
- Tyres: Bridgestone

Competition history
- Notable entrants: Panasonic Toyota Racing
- Notable drivers: 7. (Germany) Ralf Schumacher; 8. (Italy) Jarno Trulli
- Debut: 2006 Bahrain Grand Prix
- Last event: 2006 Brazilian Grand Prix
Races	Wins	Podiums	Poles	F/Laps
18	0	1	0	0
- Teams' Championships: 0
- Constructors' Championships: 0
- Drivers' Championships: 0

The Toyota TF106 is a Formula One car developed and engineered by Toyota for competing in the 2006 Formula One season. The chassis was designed by Mike Gascoyne, John Litjens and Nicolò Petrucci with the engine being designed by Luca Marmorini. The car is an evolution of the previous year's TF105. The team began testing the car in November 2005, months earlier than any other team.

== 2006 season ==
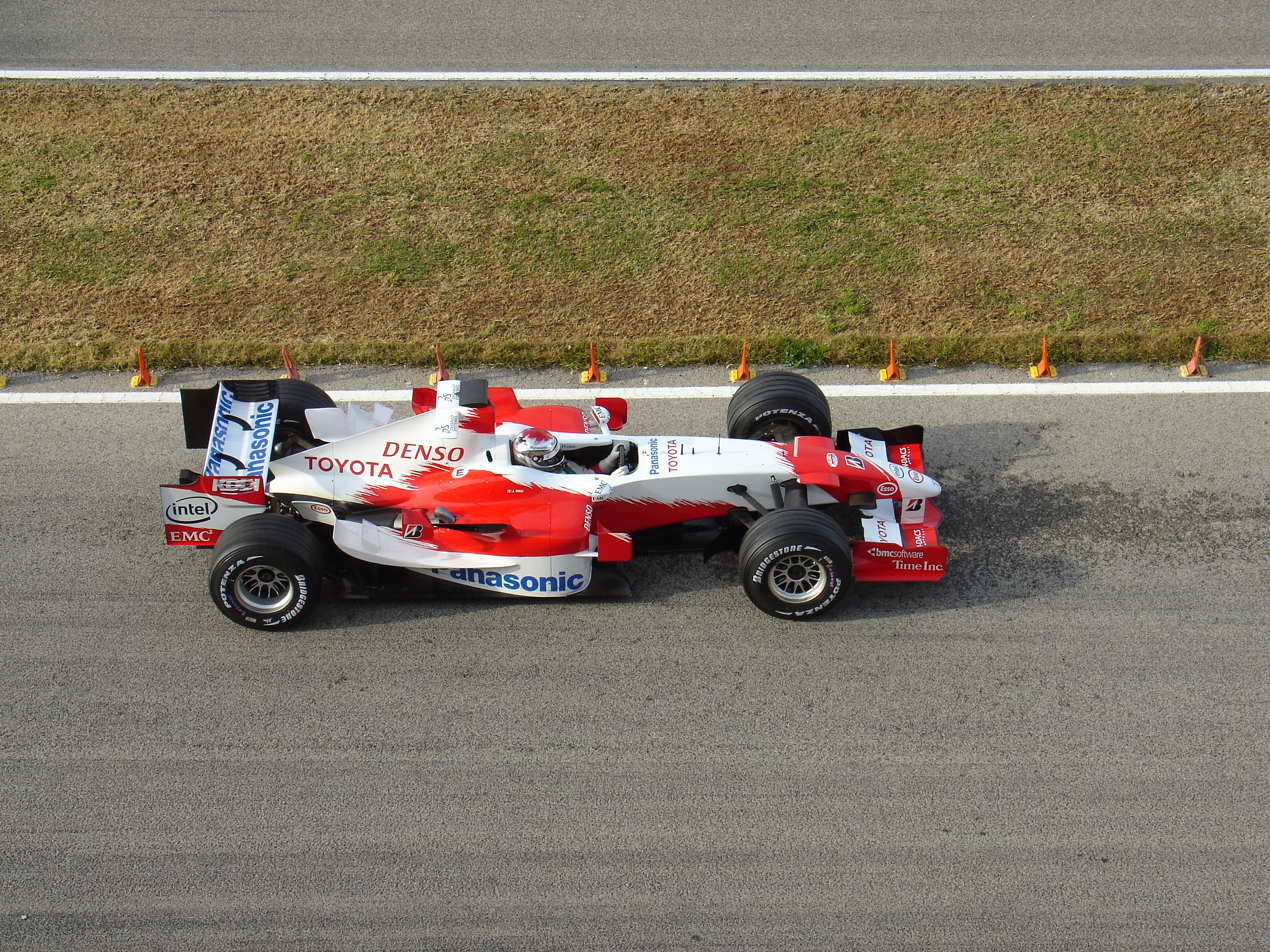
Jarno Trulli in a TF106

The TF106 was officially launched on 14 January 2006 in France. After a highly successful 2005 season, hopes were high that Toyota would be a force in the 2006 season. However, from the off it was clear that this was not to be. In Bahrain, neither driver made it through to the pole position shoot-out, indeed Ralf Schumacher failed even to make the second round. This bad form continued for some months with the only highlight being Ralf's podium in Australia, which remained the team's best result that season. At Monaco a B version of the car was introduced but the effect was not immediate and it was not until Canada that Jarno Trulli scored his first points of the season. Toyota finished the standings in 6th place with 35 points, 2 spots lower than in 2005, when they scored 88 points.

== Sponsorship and livery ==
The TF106's livery continued the Toyota color scheme established in previous years and was based on the parent company's corporate design. The car's base color was white, complemented by red accents on the nose, sidepods, and front wing. Additional blue elements were incorporated through the logo of main sponsor Panasonic. Intel and automotive supplier Denso also carried advertising on the car.

== Drivers helmets ==
- Jarno Trulli wore a special helmet at the French Grand Prix to celebrate the Italian team's victory at the 2006 FIFA World Cup in Berlin.

== Complete Formula One results ==
(key) (results in bold indicate pole position)

Year	Entrant	Chassis	Engine	Tyres	Drivers	1	2	3	4	5	6	7	8	9	10	11	12	13	14	15	16	17	18	Points	WCC
2006	Toyota	TF106	Toyota V8	**B**		BHR	MAL	AUS	SMR	EUR	ESP	MON	GBR	CAN	USA	FRA	GER	HUN	TUR	ITA	CHN	JPN	BRA	35	6th
2006	Toyota	TF106	Toyota V8	**B**	(Germany) Ralf Schumacher	14	8	3	9	Ret	Ret													35	6th
2006	Toyota	TF106	Toyota V8	**B**	(Italy) Jarno Trulli	16	9	Ret	Ret	9	10													35	6th
2006	Toyota	TF106B	Toyota V8	**B**	(Germany) Ralf Schumacher							8	Ret	Ret	Ret	4	9	6	7	15	Ret	7	Ret	35	6th
2006	Toyota	TF106B	Toyota V8	**B**	(Italy) Jarno Trulli							17^{†}	11	6	4	Ret	7	12^{†}	9	7	Ret	6	Ret	35	6th
