= Mark Gillan =

Northern Irish engineer (born 1968)

- Born: 25 January 1968 (age 58); Bangor, County Down, Northern Ireland
- Citizenship: British
- Occupations: Engineer and aerodynamicist
- Employer: Angoka
- Title: CEO

Mark Gillan is a British Formula One and motorsport engineer and aerodynamicist. He served in senior roles with the McLaren, Jaguar Racing, Toyota Racing and Williams Racing teams. He is currently the CEO of cyber security company Angoka.

== Career ==
Gillan studied aeronautical engineering at Queen’s University Belfast, graduating with a first-class Bachelor of Engineering degree in 1990. He remained at the university to complete a PhD in aeronautical engineering between 1990 and 1993, with doctoral research focused on computational analysis of viscous flow over porous aerofoils, developing expertise in computational fluid dynamics and aerodynamic modelling. Following his doctoral studies, Gillan began his professional career as a research thermodynamicist with Bombardier Inc. in Belfast, working on advanced aerospace engineering projects. He later returned to academia as a lecturer and advisor of studies in aeronautical engineering at Queen’s University Belfast between 1995 and 1998.

Gillan began his motorsport career in Formula One in 1998 with McLaren as their Principal Operational Aerodynamicist, where he led the trackside aerodynamic team, contributing to consecutive driver's titles in Woking. In 2002, he joined Jaguar Racing as Head of Vehicle Performance and Chief Race Engineer, overseeing vehicle performance engineering and race operations during the team’s latter years in Formula One. He moved to Toyota Racing in Cologne in 2007 as Head of Aerodynamics, leading aerodynamic development for Toyota’s Formula One cars across the 2007, 2008 and 2009 seasons, until the team’s withdrawal from the sport at the end of 2009.

Gillan went back to academia, lecturing at the University of Surrey before getting to itch to return to Formula One with Williams Racing. From October 2011, he was appointed Chief Operations Engineer, overseeing race team operations and engineering coordination. He remained in this position until the end of the 2012 season, overseeing a successful season with the team, including a race victory curtsy of Pastor Maldonado.

Following his Formula One career, Gillan transitioned into senior leadership roles across engineering consultancy, research and technology. He served as managing director at MTS Systems Corporation between 2013 and 2016, later led a wave power technology company, and was chief operating officer at Artemis Technologies. He subsequently worked at the King Abdullah University of Science and Technology as a vice president. He is currently the chief executive officer of the cyber security company Angoka.
