= Pascal Vasselon =

French motorsport engineer

- Born: March 20, 1963 (age 62)

Pascal Vasselon (born 20 March 1963) is a French motorsport engineer. In the 1980s Vasselon was involved in development for Renault F1, but subsequently moved to Michelin following the team's withdrawal as a constructor. He held many positions in Michelin's Formula 1 team, including F1 Director.

Vasselon was the Senior General Manager Chassis of the Toyota Racing Formula One team, based at Toyota Motorsport GmbH. When he joined Toyota F1, he was the Head of Development and Research Chassis prior to his 2006 promotion. He is the team manager of Toyota Motorsport's current sportscar prototype programme.
