= 2009 Abu Dhabi Grand Prix =

Race 17 of 17 in the 2009 Formula One World Championship
← Previous race	Next race →

Race details
- Date: 1 November 2009
- Official name: 2009 Formula 1 Etihad Airways Abu Dhabi Grand Prix
- Location: Yas Island, Abu Dhabi, United Arab Emirates
- Course: Yas Marina Circuit
- Course length: 5.554 km (3.451 miles)
- Distance: 55 laps, 305.470 km (189.810 miles)
- Weather: Dry

Pole position
Driver	(United Kingdom) Lewis Hamilton	McLaren-Mercedes
- Time: 1:40.948

Fastest lap
Driver	(Germany) Sebastian Vettel	Red Bull-Renault
- Time: 1:40.279 on lap 54

Podium
First	(Germany) Sebastian Vettel	Red Bull-Renault
Second	(Australia) Mark Webber	Red Bull-Renault
Third	(United Kingdom) Jenson Button	Brawn-Mercedes

The 2009 Abu Dhabi Grand Prix (officially the 2009 Formula 1 Etihad Airways Abu Dhabi Grand Prix) was the seventeenth and final Formula One motor race of the 2009 Formula One season. It took place on 1 November 2009 at the 5.554 kilometres (3.451 mi) Hermann Tilke-designed Yas Marina Circuit. It was the inaugural Abu Dhabi Grand Prix and also the first ever day-night Grand Prix (starting at 17:00, with sunset at 17:43 on raceday).

The race was won by Sebastian Vettel for Red Bull, with polesitter Lewis Hamilton (driving for McLaren) having retired due to a brake failure. This was the last Formula One race for Kazuki Nakajima and Giancarlo Fisichella and the Brawn GP, BMW Sauber and Toyota teams (respectively). As of 2026 this is the last F1 race to feature in-race refueling, as the practice was banned for the 2010 season. It was also the last Grand Prix appearance of a BMW-powered car in Formula One.

== Report ==
=== Background ===
Jenson Button had secured the title of World Champion in Brazil, but only two points separated the second-placed and third-placed Sebastian Vettel and Rubens Barrichello. Brawn GP was declared Constructors' Champion in Brazil with Red Bull second, but third position overall was still undecided between McLaren and Ferrari.

Tyre supplier Bridgestone selected the medium and soft tyres for the Grand Prix weekend. This would be Kimi Räikkönen's last race of his first stint with Ferrari before moving on to the World Rally Championship in 2010. (Räikkönen returned to Lotus for the 2012 season.) This would be the last race in Formula One for Nico Rosberg at Williams and for Robert Kubica (replacing Alonso at Renault in 2010) at BMW Sauber. This would be the last race for Nick Heidfeld until the 2010 Singapore Grand Prix.

As in Brazil, Kamui Kobayashi continued to race for Toyota as Timo Glock was ruled out after he was injured in a crash at the Japanese Grand Prix during qualifying.

=== Practice ===
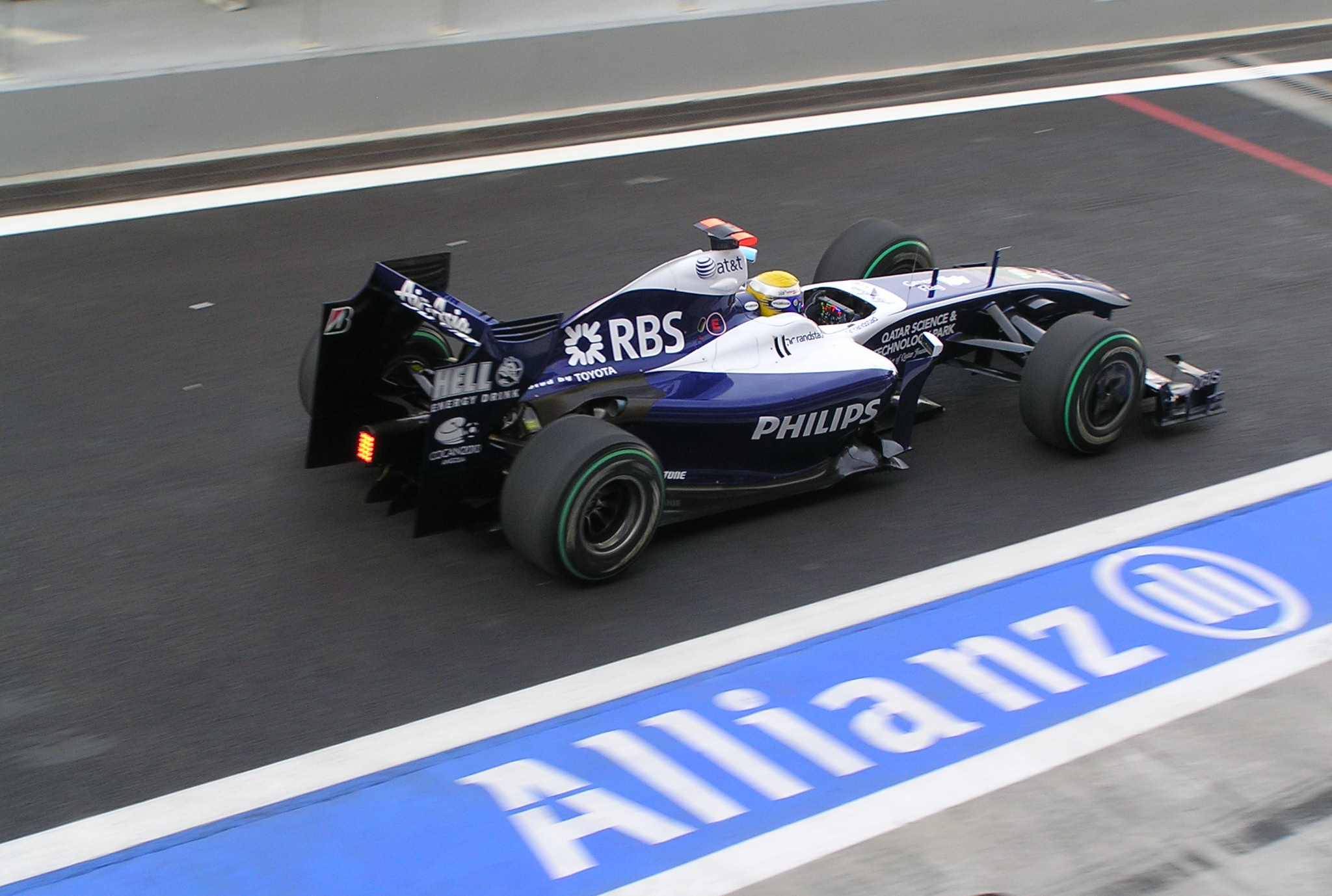
Nico Rosberg in pit lane.

In keeping with FIA regulations that state the practice and qualifying sessions must be run under the same conditions as the race, the practice sessions were run in the late afternoon and early evening so as to simulate the transition between day and night.

The sessions were dominated by the McLaren team, with Lewis Hamilton spending most of his time on or near the very top of the timing sheets. He set the early standard in the first session, producing a fastest lap of 1:43.939. Teammate Heikki Kovalainen struggled initially, but eventually set the fastest time of the second session – 1:41.307, two-tenths of a second faster than teammate Hamilton. – and retained his pace in the third.

At Ferrari, both Kimi Räikkönen and Giancarlo Fisichella struggled, spending most of the weekend at the bottom of the timing sheets, though a pair of last-minute one-lap charges by Räikkönen saved the team from total embarrassment. Fisichella was less than impressed with Yas Marina's underground pit exit, claiming it was both very difficult and dangerous, despite it remaining incident-free.

Robert Kubica stopped on the circuit halfway through the second practice session with a suspected engine failure. The Pole, down to the last of his eight racing engines, was running with a used engine at the time, thus preventing the need for him to take a grid penalty. Nick Heidfeld spent most of the sessions at the tail end – at one point unable to explain why he was over two seconds slower than Kubica – until his final runs in the last session, which elevated him into the top ten.

Like Ferrari, Renault struggled all weekend. Unlike Ferrari, neither Fernando Alonso or Romain Grosjean were able to do much about it, simply unable to find speed around the circuit. Alonso, however commented that the Yas Marina circuit was enjoyable, stating that there was always something to do.

Kamui Kobayashi continued to impress in what was only his second outing for Toyota, frequently out-pacing teammate Jarno Trulli, and at one point setting the third-fastest lap time. However, Kobayashi's program for the weekend consisted mostly of doing dummy qualifying runs, while Trulli was focusing on pace over an extended period, meaning the difference between the two drivers was not as great as it appeared to be.

The Toro Rosso drivers continued their trend of being the very first out in the early sessions. Sébastien Buemi demonstrated that his pace in Japan and Brazil was no one-off, and he spent most of the practice sessions near the top of the timing sheets and was the first person to break the 1:40.000 barrier in the third practice session. Jaime Alguersuari was less receptive to the circuit than others and was overshadowed by his teammate until a hydraulics problem sidelined him for the duration of the third session.

Red Bull drivers Mark Webber and Sebastian Vettel also had strong sessions, hinting at a pace that would eventually show itself in qualifying. After Hamilton set a time a second faster than anyone else in the third session, it was Vettel who led the rest of the field in making up the gap, however both drivers would finish outside the top ten.

Williams' Nico Rosberg echoed Alonso's sentiments that he liked the circuit, stating that every corner was 'unique'. However, both he and teammate Kazuki Nakajima had an inconsistent weekend, alternating between the bottom end of the top ten and running as low as fifteenth.

Force India's Adrian Sutil commented that he preferred Abu Dhabi over Marina Bay in Singapore as it was easier to see around the Yas Marina circuit. After being limited by brake problems early in the first session, he eventually took to the circuit. Like teammate Vitantonio Liuzzi, his occasional bursts of speed were soon overrun by the other drivers.

Jenson Button spent most of first practice exchanging blows with Hamilton, responding to each of Hamilton's fastest laps with one of his own. The trend continued into the third session with Button prevailing, setting a 1:40.625, two-thousandths of a second quicker than Hamilton. Rubens Barrichello had a relatively anonymous string of practice sessions, finishing within the top ten on each occasion, but never quite having the pace of his teammate.

=== Qualifying ===
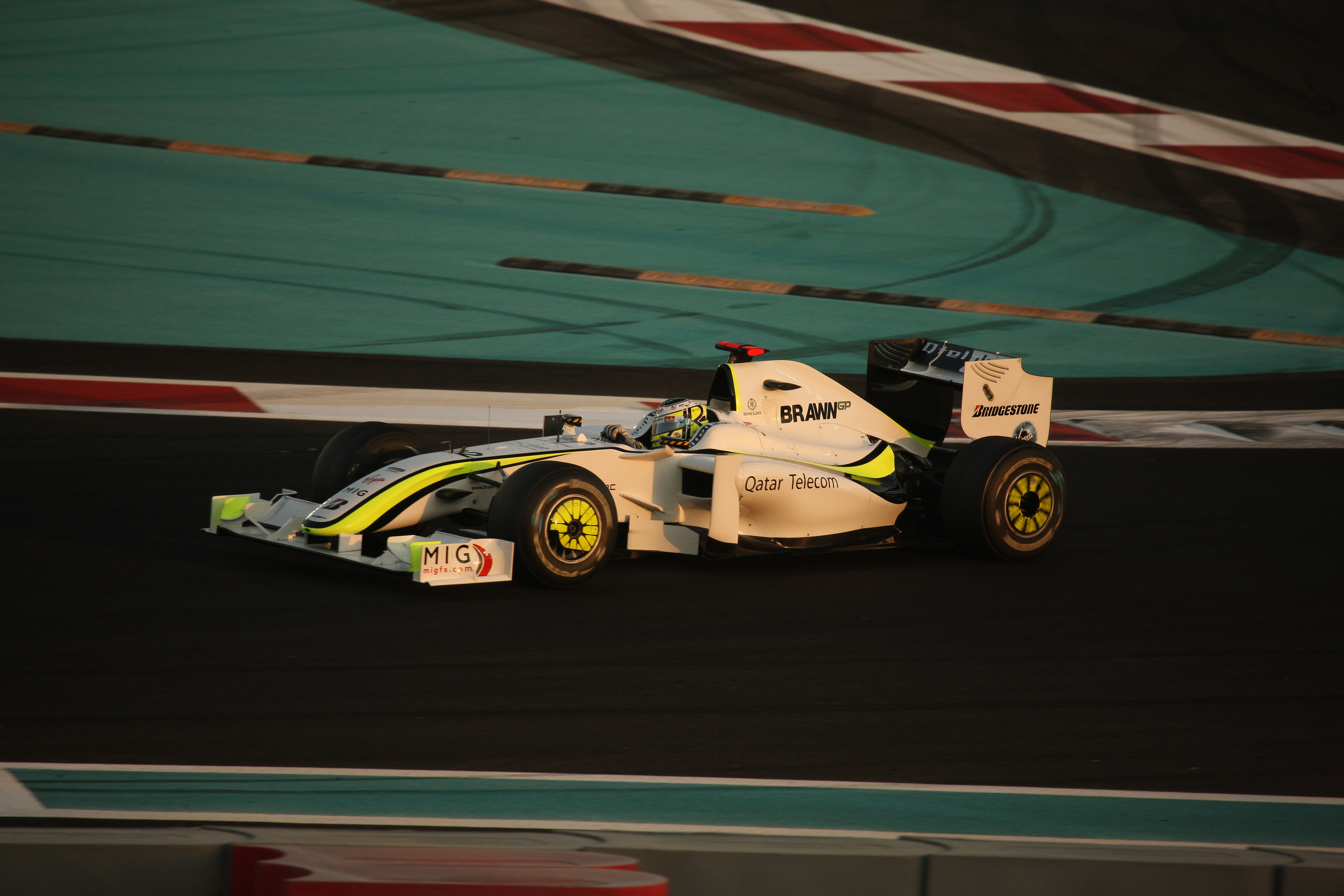
Jenson Button qualified fifth for his only race as World Champion-designate.

Lewis Hamilton was the fastest in the first qualifying session, becoming the first man to set a lap time of less than 1:40.000 with a 1:39.873. Fellow Briton Jenson Button was the only other driver who came close, with his best lap time half a second slower than Hamilton. For the fourth race of the season – after Luca Badoer in Valencia and Spa, and Giancarlo Fisichella at Interlagos – a Ferrari qualified in twentieth and last place, with Fisichella finishing one second behind Kimi Räikkönen and two behind Hamilton. Joining Fisichella in an early elimination were the Force Indias of Adrian Sutil and Vitantonio Liuzzi and the Renaults of Fernando Alonso and Romain Grosjean after Jaime Alguersuari relegated Alonso to fifteenth place in the final few minutes of the first session.

Hamilton once again topped the second session with another lap time under 1:40.000, though this time Sebastian Vettel was able to break the same barrier as well, the only other person to do so all weekend. By the time the second session had come around, night was falling over the circuit, and with it the track temperature dropped. Despite the cars carrying less fuel in the second session, the difference in lap times between Q1 and Q2 was noticeably smaller than at other races, with many of the drivers struggling to improve upon their first-session times. Heikki Kovalainen came to a halt on the circuit with a gearbox failure, which would afford him a five-place penalty for the race. Elsewhere, the second Ferrari of Kimi Räikkönen was eliminated, as were Jaime Alguersuari and Kazuki Nakajima. Kamui Kobayashi was also eliminated after qualifying twelfth, just one place behind his starting position in Brazil.

The third session was unique in that once the drivers left the pits, they stayed out for the duration; in previous races, they have gone out once at the start and once at the end, or simply waited until the final few minutes to set a time. This was attributed to the tyres, as it took several laps for the drivers to get either compound up to a working temperature. Lewis Hamilton remained in the pits while the other nine took to the circuit. The lap times started falling as the drivers did several laps, with Jenson Button and Jarno Trulli exchanging lap times before Hamilton emerged and took the provisional pole. Sebastian Vettel and Mark Webber both went faster, only for Hamilton to secure a front-row berth on his final lap with a 1:40.948 and leaving Vettel and Webber second and third respectively. Rubens Barrichello slotted into fourth, while Button edged out Trulli for fifth. The BMW Saubers of Robert Kubica and Nick Heidfeld took seventh and eighth, followed by the Williams of Nico Rosberg in his final race for the Grove-based team, and Sébastien Buemi taking tenth on his twenty-first birthday.

=== Race ===
Sebastian Vettel and Mark Webber gave Red Bull their fourth one-two finish of the season, with Vettel finishing seventeen seconds ahead of his teammate.

Lewis Hamilton led the race from the start, but did not open a singularly impressive lead as was expected, and Vettel stayed within a few seconds of him during the early phase of the race. There was contact between Rubens Barrichello and Webber in the first corner, with Barrichello losing a part of his front wing, which hurt his pace to begin with. The first lap was otherwise clean.

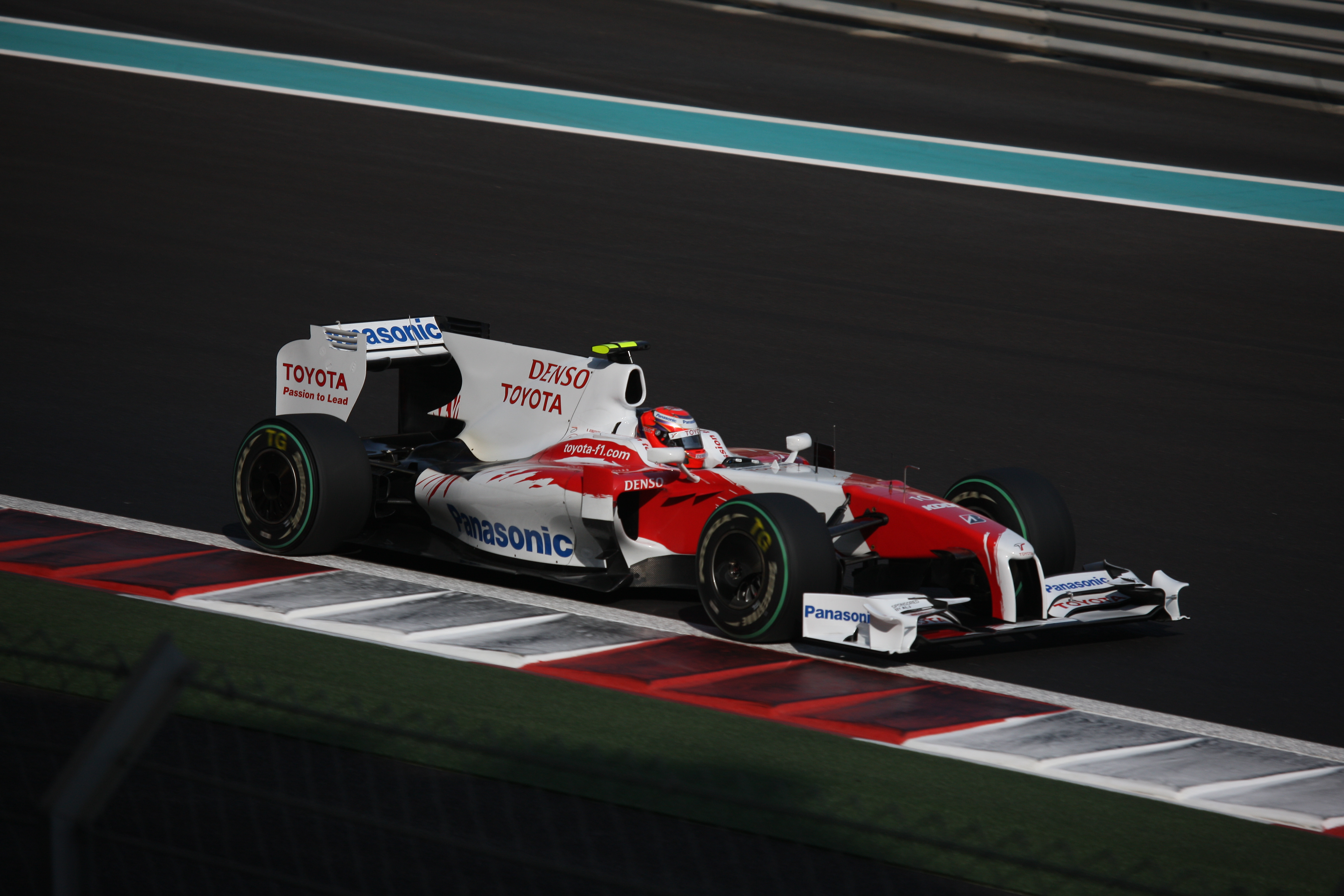
Kamui Kobayashi scored points in his second Formula One race.

Vettel leap-frogged Hamilton during the first round of stops before the McLaren pit wall reported that Hamilton had a problem with his right-rear brake. Hamilton was forced to retire the car after eighteen laps, as it was unsafe to continue given that the circuit contained three very large braking areas. It was briefly suggested that the problem may have been a faulty data logger that was showing a problem, but McLaren was still obliged to retire the car. The only other retirement of the race was Jaime Alguersuari during the pit stops. His in-lap had been slow and he made the mistake of pulling up in the Red Bull pit instead of the Toro Rosso garages. With Sebastian Vettel due in that lap, Red Bull were forced to send him back out. Alguersuari later claimed that when he was ready for the stop, his team were not. The Red Bull and Toro Rosso garages were located next to one another, with the pit crews in similar uniforms. Alguersuari retired when he returned to the circuit.

From there, the race remained relatively incident-free. Jenson Button exited from his stop to find the Toyota of Kamui Kobayashi, who was running on a one-stop strategy. Button, in a heavier car and with tyres that would take several laps to break in, was powerless to stop Kobayashi from simply driving around the outside of him at the giant hairpin at one end of the circuit. Kobayashi would run as high as third during the race before his stop, and would ultimately finish sixth, collecting three World Championship points in only his second race. His performance in Brazil and Abu Dhabi in particular impressed Toyota's management enough for him to be seriously considered for a full-time race seat in 2010 (although it subsequently transpired that Toyota withdrew from Formula One before the start of the 2010 season). Fellow Japanese driver Kazuki Nakajima finished in thirteenth, making him the only driver to race in every Grand Prix of the season without scoring a single point.

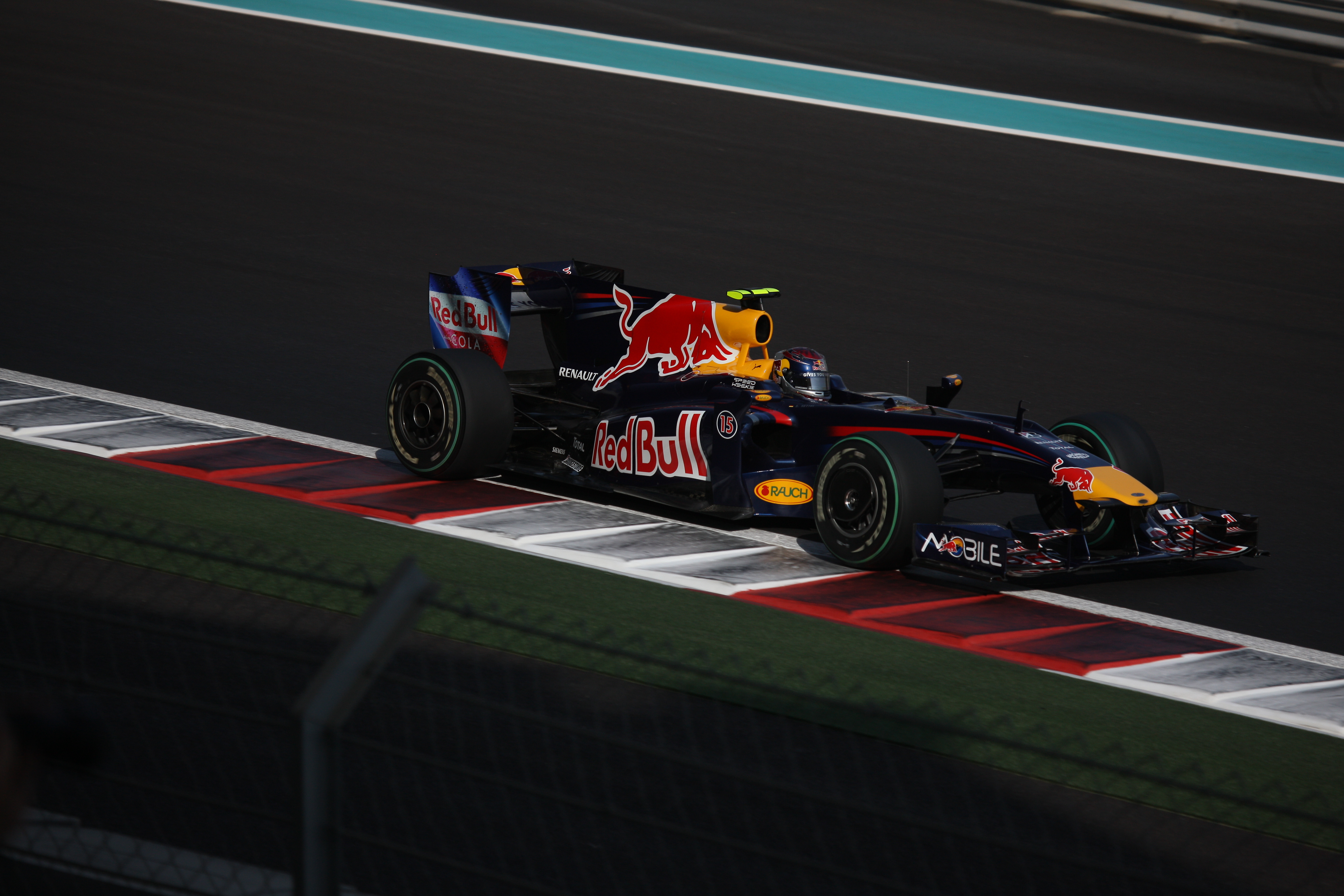
Sebastian Vettel took his fourth victory of the season.

Elsewhere, Giancarlo Fisichella was given a drive-through penalty and finished his final race for Ferrari a lowly sixteenth, ahead of only Adrian Sutil and Romain Grosjean. Ferrari teammate Kimi Räikkönen – in the final race for his first stint at the Maranello-based outfit, before his return at the 2014 Australian Grand Prix – had a similar struggle from eleventh on the grid, finishing down in twelfth behind fellow Finn Heikki Kovalainen. Ferrari's failure to score points meant that the team conceded third place in the Constructors' championship, closing their worst season since Jean Alesi and Gerhard Berger drove for them in 1993.

The final few laps saw Jenson Button begin to rapidly reel in the second-placed Mark Webber, whose rear tyres were steadily beginning to lose grip. Button caught up with him with six laps to go, and the final lap was one of the hardest-fought of the season. Both drivers made an error going into the chicane and hairpin, and while Button attempted to make a move on Webber going down the back straight, the Australian defended his line into the switchback. The move meant that Button had the racing line and came out of the ninth corner nose-to-tail with the Red Bull. Button drew alongside Webber in the run down to the bottom corner, forcing Webber to take a defensive line again, but the Red Bull driver held his line and managed to pull the car up in time and held on for second place despite a minor error at turn fourteen.

At the front of the field, Sebastian Vettel won the race by seventeen seconds, securing the runner-up position in the championship from Barrichello, who went on to finish fourth ahead of Nick Heidfeld in BMW Sauber's final race. Kobayashi was sixth, scoring his first career points, with Toyota teammate Jarno Trulli taking seventh, and Sébastien Buemi closing out the points-scoring positions in eighth, four seconds ahead of the Williams of Nico Rosberg, also in his final race for his team.

This was the last race to feature pit stops for refueling, which had been re-introduced in 1994, as the regulations for 2010 had banned them. Jarno Trulli made the final refueling stop on lap 42. This was also the last race to use the 10-8-6-5-4-3-2-1 points scoring system, introduced in 2003 and the last race to date for drivers Fisichella, Nakajima, and the constructors Toyota, BMW and Brawn GP.

== Classification ==
=== Qualifying ===
Cars that use the KERS system are marked with "‡"

Pos	No	Driver	Constructor	Part 1	Part 2	Part 3	Grid
1	1‡	(United Kingdom) Lewis Hamilton	McLaren-Mercedes	1:39.873	1:39.695	1:40.948	1
2	15	(Germany) Sebastian Vettel	Red Bull-Renault	1:40.666	1:39.984	1:41.615	2
3	14	(Australia) Mark Webber	Red Bull-Renault	1:40.667	1:40.272	1:41.726	3
4	23	(Brazil) Rubens Barrichello	Brawn-Mercedes	1:40.574	1:40.421	1:41.786	4
5	22	(United Kingdom) Jenson Button	Brawn-Mercedes	1:40.378	1:40.148	1:41.892	5
6	9	(Italy) Jarno Trulli	Toyota	1:40.517	1:40.373	1:41.897	6
7	5	(Poland) Robert Kubica	BMW Sauber	1:40.520	1:40.545	1:41.992	7
8	6	(Germany) Nick Heidfeld	BMW Sauber	1:40.558	1:40.635	1:42.343	8
9	16	(Germany) Nico Rosberg	Williams-Toyota	1:40.842	1:40.661	1:42.583	9
10	12	(Switzerland) Sébastien Buemi	Toro Rosso-Ferrari	1:40.908	1:40.430	1:42.713	10
11	4‡	(Finland) Kimi Räikkönen	Ferrari	1:41.100	1:40.726		11
12	10	(Japan) Kamui Kobayashi	Toyota	1:41.035	1:40.777		12
13	2‡	(Finland) Heikki Kovalainen	McLaren-Mercedes	1:40.808	1:40.983		18^{1}
14	17	(Japan) Kazuki Nakajima	Williams-Toyota	1:41.096	1:41.148		13
15	11	(Spain) Jaime Alguersuari	Toro Rosso-Ferrari	1:41.503	1:41.689		14
16	7	(Spain) Fernando Alonso	Renault	1:41.667			15
17	21	(Italy) Vitantonio Liuzzi	Force India-Mercedes	1:41.701			16
18	20	(Germany) Adrian Sutil	Force India-Mercedes	1:41.863			17
19	8	(France) Romain Grosjean	Renault	1:41.950			19
20	3‡	(Italy) Giancarlo Fisichella	Ferrari	1:42.184			20

Notes

- ^1 – Heikki Kovalainen dropped five places on the grid, after his gearbox required changing after a failure in qualifying.

=== Race ===
Cars that use the KERS system are marked with "‡"

Pos	No	Driver	Constructor	Laps	Time/Retired	Grid	Points
1	15	(Germany) Sebastian Vettel	Red Bull-Renault	55	1:34:03.414	2	10
2	14	(Australia) Mark Webber	Red Bull-Renault	55	+17.857	3	8
3	22	(United Kingdom) Jenson Button	Brawn-Mercedes	55	+18.467	5	6
4	23	(Brazil) Rubens Barrichello	Brawn-Mercedes	55	+22.735	4	5
5	6	(Germany) Nick Heidfeld	BMW Sauber	55	+26.253	8	4
6	10	(Japan) Kamui Kobayashi	Toyota	55	+28.343	12	3
7	9	(Italy) Jarno Trulli	Toyota	55	+34.366	6	2
8	12	(Switzerland) Sébastien Buemi	Toro Rosso-Ferrari	55	+41.294	10	1
9	16	(Germany) Nico Rosberg	Williams-Toyota	55	+45.941	9	
10	5	(Poland) Robert Kubica	BMW Sauber	55	+48.180	7	
11	2‡	(Finland) Heikki Kovalainen	McLaren-Mercedes	55	+52.798	18	
12	4‡	(Finland) Kimi Räikkönen	Ferrari	55	+54.317	11	
13	17	(Japan) Kazuki Nakajima	Williams-Toyota	55	+59.839	13	
14	7	(Spain) Fernando Alonso	Renault	55	+1:09.687	15	
15	21	(Italy) Vitantonio Liuzzi	Force India-Mercedes	55	+1:34.450	16	
16	3‡	(Italy) Giancarlo Fisichella	Ferrari	54	+1 Lap	20	
17	20	(Germany) Adrian Sutil	Force India-Mercedes	54	+1 Lap	17	
18	8	(France) Romain Grosjean	Renault	54	+1 Lap	19	
Ret	1‡	(United Kingdom) Lewis Hamilton	McLaren-Mercedes	20	Brakes	1	
Ret	11	(Spain) Jaime Alguersuari	Toro Rosso-Ferrari	18	Gearbox	14	

== Championship standings after the race ==
Drivers' Championship standings

Pos.	Driver	Points
1	(United Kingdom) **Jenson Button**	95
2	(Germany) Sebastian Vettel	84
3	(Brazil) Rubens Barrichello	77
4	(Australia) Mark Webber	69.5
5	(United Kingdom) Lewis Hamilton	49

Constructors' Championship standings

Pos.	Constructor	Points
1	(United Kingdom) **Brawn-Mercedes**	172
2	(Austria) Red Bull-Renault	153.5
3	(United Kingdom) McLaren-Mercedes	71
4	(Italy) Ferrari	70
5	(Japan) Toyota	59.5

- Note: Only the top five positions are included for both sets of standings.
- **Bold text** indicates the 2009 World Champions.

== See also ==
- 2009 Yas Marina GP2 Asia Series round

Previous race: 2009 Brazilian Grand Prix	FIA Formula One World Championship; 2009 season	Next race: 2010 Bahrain Grand Prix
Previous race: None	Abu Dhabi Grand Prix	Next race: 2010 Abu Dhabi Grand Prix
Awards
Preceded by 2008 Singapore Grand Prix	Formula One Promotional Trophy for Race Promoter; 2009	Succeeded by 2010 Korean Grand Prix
