= 2009 Singapore Grand Prix =

Coordinates: 1°17′22″N 103°51′32″E

Race 14 of 17 in the 2009 Formula One World Championship
← Previous race	Next race →
- Marina Bay Street Circuit

Race details
- Date: 27 September 2009
- Official name: 2009 Formula 1 SingTel Singapore Grand Prix
- Location: Marina Bay Street Circuit; Marina Bay, Singapore
- Course: Street Circuit
- Course length: 5.073 km (3.152 miles)
- Distance: 61 laps, 309.316 km (192.201 miles)
- Weather: Hot and Dry
- Attendance: 249,000 (3-Day Total); 83,000 (3-Day Average)

Pole position
Driver	(United Kingdom) Lewis Hamilton	McLaren-Mercedes
- Time: 1:47.891

Fastest lap
Driver	(Spain) Fernando Alonso	Renault
- Time: 1:48.240 on lap 53

Podium
First	(United Kingdom) Lewis Hamilton	McLaren-Mercedes
Second	(Germany) Timo Glock	Toyota
Third	(Spain) Fernando Alonso	Renault

The 2009 Singapore Grand Prix (formally the 2009 Formula 1 SingTel Singapore Grand Prix) was a Formula One motor race held at the Marina Bay Street Circuit in Singapore on 27 September 2009. The 61-lap race was the fourteenth round of the 2009 Formula One season. It was the second Singapore Grand Prix to be part of a Formula One Championship and the tenth Singapore Grand Prix overall. It was also the second Formula One race to be held at night. The race was won by McLaren-Mercedes driver and reigning World Champion Lewis Hamilton. Toyota's Timo Glock finished second and 2008 race winner Fernando Alonso took third position, making this the only race of the season with neither a Brawn nor a Red Bull driver on the podium. This was also the last race of 2009 for Glock, as he was injured during qualifying for the Japanese Grand Prix and was replaced by test driver Kamui Kobayashi. Heikki Kovalainen scored his last World Championship points at this race, as did second-placed Glock.

As a consequence of the race, Championship leader Jenson Button extended his lead by one point finishing in fifth, one position ahead of Brawn teammate and Championship rival Rubens Barrichello. Fellow rival Sebastian Vettel had been challenging Hamilton for the lead before a drive-through penalty for speeding in the pitlane scuppered his strategy.

== Report ==
=== Background ===
Fernando Alonso of Renault was the only previous winner of the race but recent controversy over last year's victory surrounded the race. Last year's pole sitter Felipe Massa sat out the race with injuries sustained in the Hungarian Grand Prix. The previous street circuit races this year were won by Brawn GP with Jenson Button taking the chequered flag in Monaco and Rubens Barrichello victorious in Valencia.

Prior to the race, Button led the Championship by 14 points from teammate Barrichello, with Brawn's closest challenger Sebastian Vettel lying 12 points behind the Brazilian and 26 behind Button. Kimi Räikkönen of Ferrari was looking for a fifth consecutive podium, having scored three quarters of his 40 2009 championship points in the previous four races.

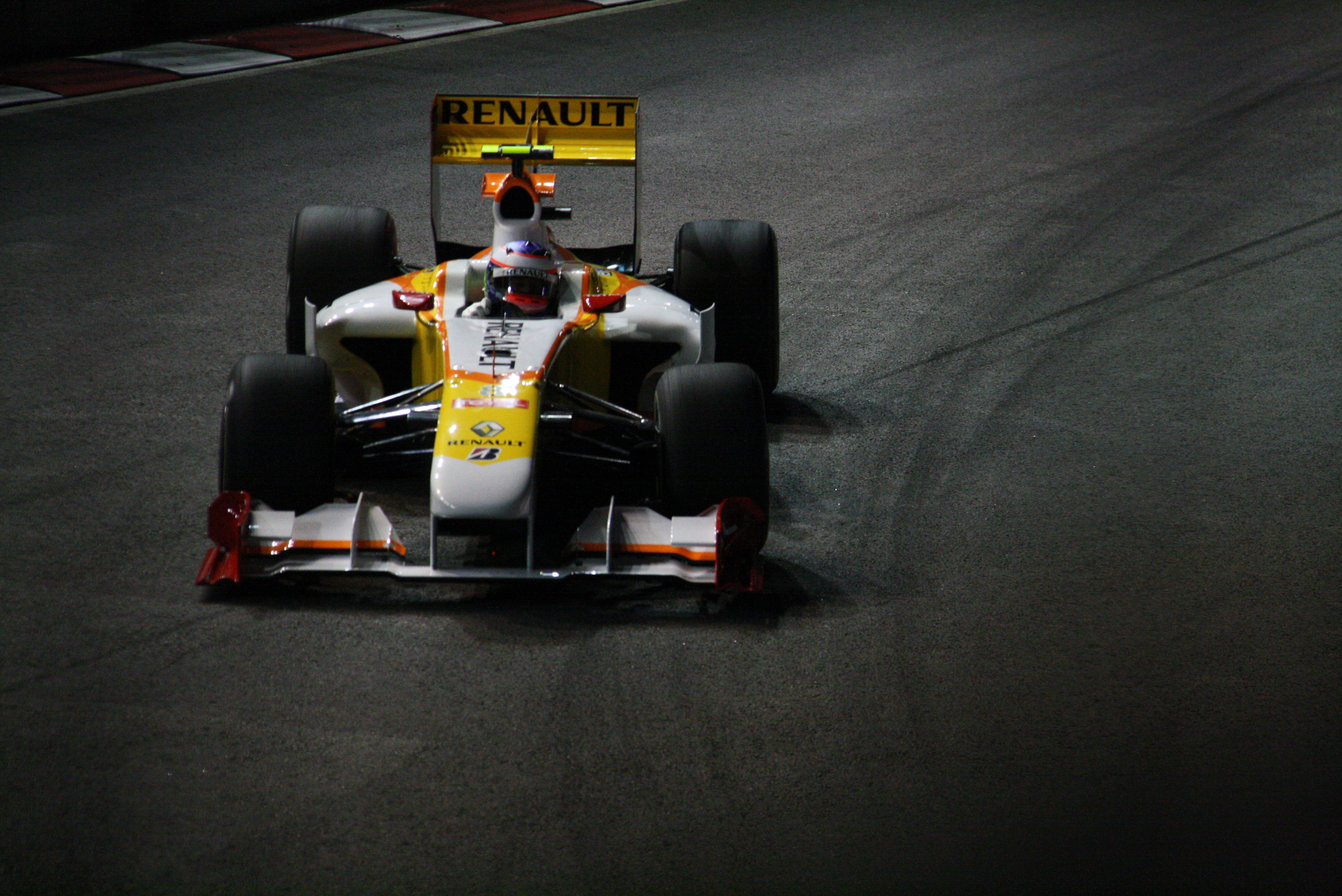
Renault lost their title sponsor ING and removed the stickers before Friday practice.

Brawn led the Constructors' Championship on 146 points (and could have clinched the Constructors' title in Singapore), whilst Red Bull were 40.5 behind on 105.5. Ferrari and McLaren were 3rd and 4th respectively.

The circuit was also reprofiled slightly, including modifications to turns 1, 2, 3, 13 and 14 to aid overtaking, and also at turn 10 where high kerbs caused many accidents in 2008. The entrance and exit to the pit lane were also changed. The cars entered the pit lane before turn 22 while the most significant change was the exit of the pits with the cars now joining after turn 1. As a result, the total length of the circuit increased by 6 metres.

Turns 1, 7 and 10 were now known as "Sheares", "Memorial" and "Singapore Sling" respectively. The namesake of these names are as follows: "Sheares" is named after the Benjamin Sheares Bridge that spans on the expressway above the circuit, which is in turn named after ex-President of the Republic Benjamin Sheares. "Memorial" is named after the WWII War Memorial in the middle of the city, and "Singapore Sling" is the name of Singapore's signature drink.

Announced on Thursday evening (UTC) that title sponsor ING and Mutua Madrileña had terminated their sponsorship deals with Renault with immediate effect. This move followed the previous year's Singapore Grand Prix race-fixing scandal that resulted in a suspended ban for the team. Renault removed the sponsors' logos from their cars before they ran them on track. Mutua Madrileña continued however to back 2005 and 2006 World Champion Fernando Alonso.

=== Practice ===
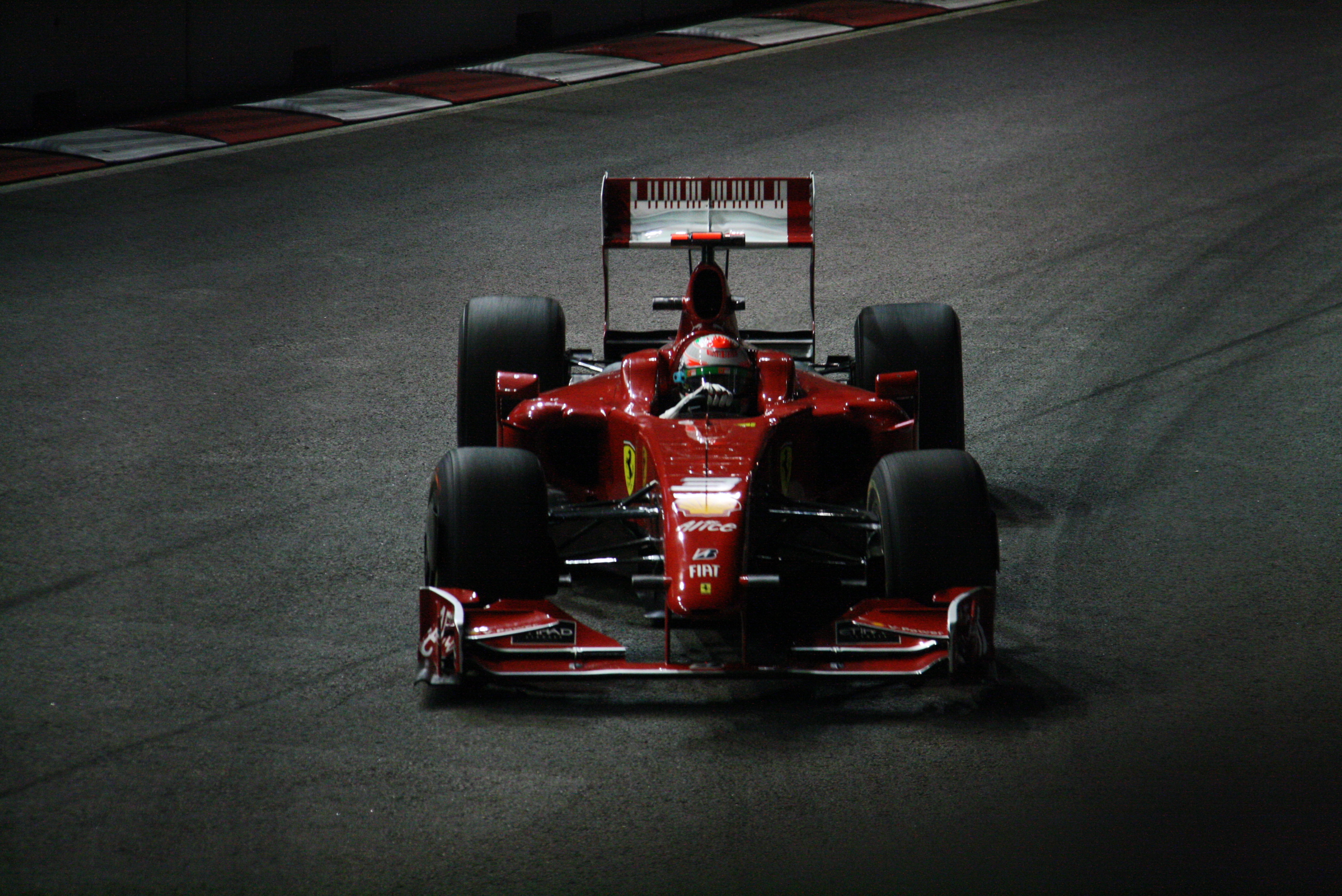
Giancarlo Fisichella struggled in practice, and qualified in 18th place.

The first session of the weekend ended as the previous race finished with the two Brawns on top, Rubens Barrichello in front of Jenson Button. Renault's Romain Grosjean caused the session to be stopped after losing control of the car at the same corner that Nelson Piquet Jr. crashed out during the race at last year's event. Adrian Sutil and Heikki Kovalainen were the others who had on track incidents. Fernando Alonso split the two Red Bull's in fourth, Mark Webber finished the session in third and Sebastian Vettel in fifth. Giancarlo Fisichella continued to struggle as he finished the session P17, around 1.6s behind teammate Kimi Räikkönen.

The second session was also red flagged this time with Red Bull's Mark Webber. A big accident on the pit straight as the nose, front left wheel and the wing took the impact as a lot of debris was put onto the track. However the other Red Bull of Vettel finished the session top 0.2s ahead of Alonso. Kovalainen took third, Heidfeld fourth and championship leader Button finished the days final session in fifth. Jenson's teammate Barrichello struggled to take eleventh almost one second slower than Vettel. Although Webber crashed out with one hour remaining in the session he managed to sixth.

The final practice session got under way with no cars posting a time for the best part of 15 minutes. With the first session of the weekend not being red-flagged it was Lewis Hamilton who finished top of the time sheets. Sebastian Vettel finished second trying to make the most of this Red Bull car as his teammate Mark Webber struggled for pace finishing down in thirteenth. The Williams of Nico Rosberg came third with Hamilton's teammate Heikki Kovalainen in fourth. Rubens Barrichello finished in sixth behind the two BMW's of Robert Kubica and Nick Heidfeld. Rubens's teammate and championship leader Jenson Button struggled and only managed fourteenth. The two Force India drivers didn't look quick at all as the high down-force circuit of Singapore didn't seem to suit the car. They ended the session P16 and 17. Giancarlo Fisichella seemed to be struggling a lot being 1.2s behind teammate Räikkönen and 2.4s behind Lewis Hamilton.

=== Qualifying ===
The first qualifying session began with Renault's Romain Grosjean going down the escape round at turn 17 due to brake issues. Rosberg set the early pace but Button, Vettel, and Hamilton responded quickly with their own flying laps. Both Ferrari's were struggling until Räikkönen took second with three minutes remaining. His teammate Fisichella was eliminated alongside Sutil, Alguersuari, Romain Grosjean, and Liuzzi. This was the first time since the 2006 Australian Grand Prix that neither Ferrari driver made it into the top ten in qualifying.

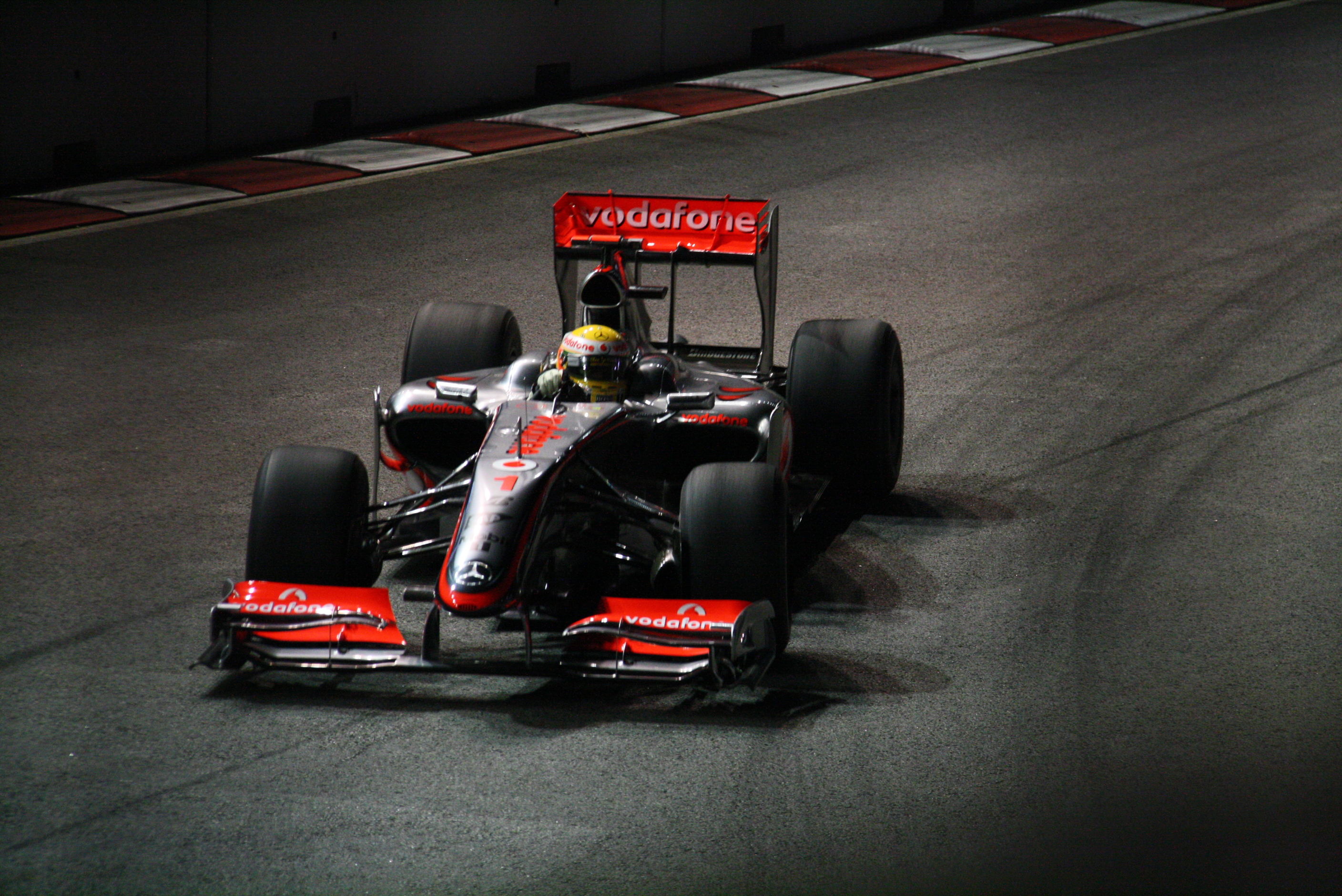
Lewis Hamilton took pole position for McLaren.

At the beginning of the second qualifying session, Mark Webber was the pace-setter, but an amazing lap by Nico Rosberg secured his place in Q3. Button was struggling throughout the session, and, after narrowly avoiding putting the car into the wall on his final lap, he qualified a dismal twelfth. His teammate, Barrichello, made it through to Q3, but a post-qualifying gearbox change saw the Brazilian take a five-place grid penalty. Alongside Button, Nakajima, Kimi Räikkönen, Buemi, and Trulli were knocked out in this session.

The top 10 drivers set their early quick laps. Hamilton took the early lead with Vettel and Rosberg close behind. Barrichello spun off and hit the wall hard, destroying much of the left side of his car, which brought out the yellow flags. The red flag was brought out with 26 seconds remaining on the clock. The session was restarted, but the very low amount of time meant that no one was able to get back on track, and the session was effectively ended early. Hamilton took pole position ahead of Vettel, Rosberg, and Mark Webber. Although Barrichello qualified fifth, he started the race tenth after his gearbox change. This session was the third of four to be red flagged during the weekend; only the third practice session was not interrupted.

=== Race ===
Approximately three hours before the scheduled race start it was announced Nick Heidfeld would be starting the race from the pitlane, after his team discovered insufficient ballast had been fitted to his car. This promoted all the cars behind him one position on the grid, significantly moving both the Brawn cars onto the 'clean' side of the starting grid, on the racing line.

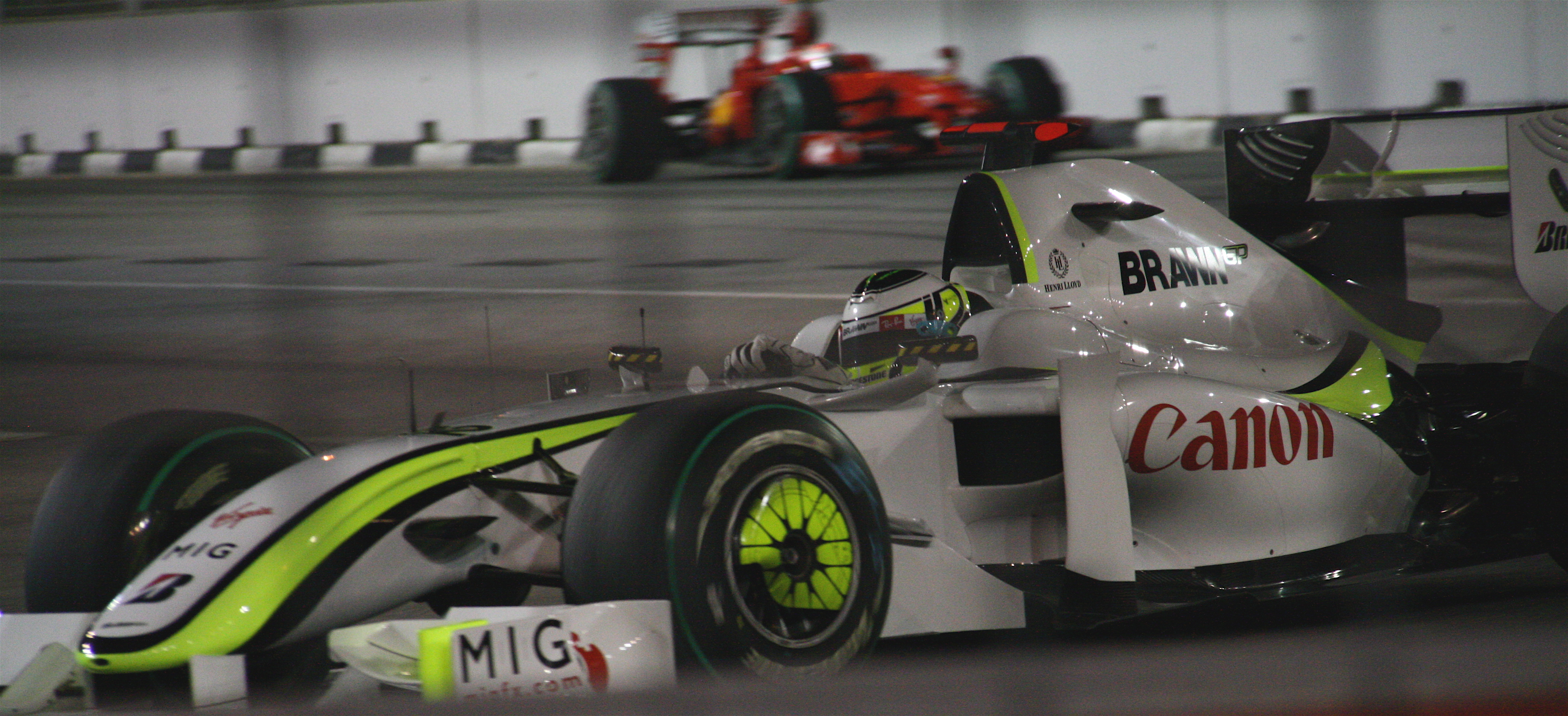
Jenson Button finished fifth, extending his championship lead over teammate Rubens Barrichello by one point.

The race began shortly after 8pm local time with Lewis Hamilton making a clean start from pole position. Nico Rosberg took advantage of being on the clean side of the track to overtake Sebastian Vettel into the first corner. Fernando Alonso attempted to also pass Vettel but was unsuccessful, giving Mark Webber the opportunity to overtake Alonso on the outside of Turn 7. Both Alonso and Webber went off track as Webber completed the move. Stewards deemed Webber's move illegal and on lap seven he was told to hand the position back to Alonso, which also meant letting Timo Glock through as the German had also passed Alonso on the first lap. Alonso's Renault teammate Romain Grosjean was not having any more luck, having to retire at the end of lap three with a recurring brake problem.

With Barrichello in seventh and Button out of the points scoring positions in 10th, Vettel looked to capitalise and try to close Button's 26 point lead in the Championship. By lap 13 he was 2.1 seconds behind Rosberg, who was in turn 2.5 seconds behind Hamilton. Vettel was the first of the leaders to stop, on lap 17. A lap later Rosberg pitted but he misjudged the level of grip on the pit exit, causing his car to cross the white line that distinguishes the pit lane from the race track, an offence that is punished by a drive-through penalty. Rosberg was issued with the penalty on lap 20 and would have to serve penalty within three racing laps. Hamilton also pitted on lap 20.

The following lap, an accident involving Adrian Sutil and Nick Heidfeld necessitated the deployment of the Safety Car to remove debris from the track. Sutil spun attempting to pass Jaime Alguersuari on the inside of Turn 14 and, with his car facing the wrong way, attempted to rejoin the circuit as Heidfeld was taking the corner, causing a collision that forced both cars to retire, Heidfeld's first non finish since the 2007 United States Grand Prix. Sutil was later reprimanded and fined $20,000 by stewards for dangerous driving.

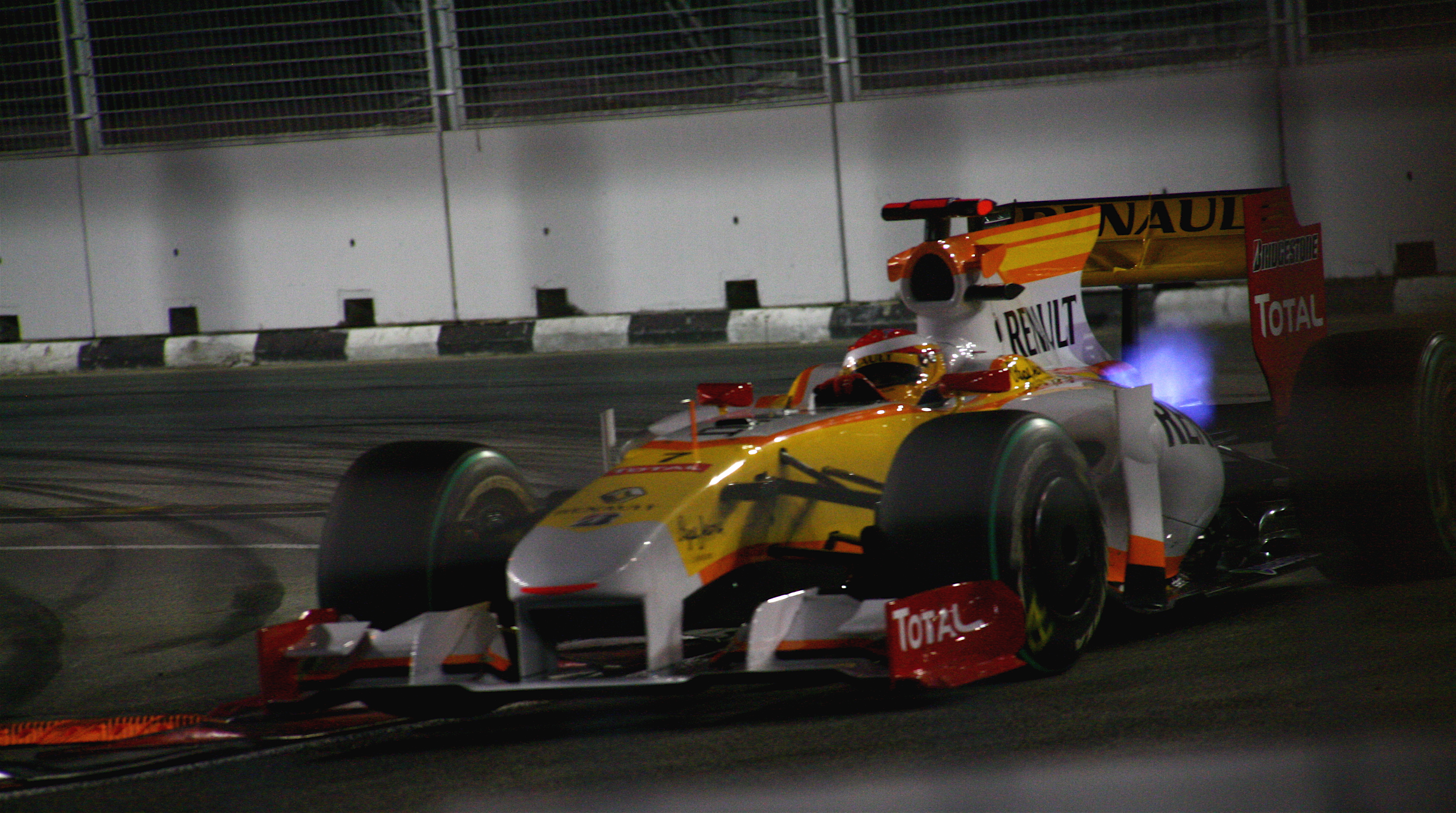
Fernando Alonso controversially dedicated his podium to Flavio Briatore after the race.

Most cars that had thus far not pitted for fuel and tyres did so under the Safety Car conditions, including both Brawn cars. The Safety Car did not benefit Rosberg, as Formula One regulations prevent a drive-through penalty being served under Safety Car conditions, meaning he would have to stop within two laps of the restart when the field was still closely bunched. During this round of pit stops, Alguersuari repeated the infamous mistake made by Felipe Massa at the 2008 race by attempting to exit his pit garage with the fuel hose still attached.

The race restarted on lap 26, with Vettel now pressurising Hamilton for the lead. Rosberg served his penalty on lap 28, demoting him to 14th position. Hamilton and Vettel traded fastest laps with the gap between them hovering under a second. Behind Vettel the longer-fuelled Timo Glock was being encouraged to keep pushing as his team believed they could leap-frog the Red Bull in the pits.

Vettel pitted for his second stop on lap 39 and was clearly pushing very hard, running over a kerb on his out lap and damaging the underside of his car, having already lost his right wing mirror. However, worse was to come, as on lap 40 the stewards handed him a drive-through penalty for speeding in the pit lane.

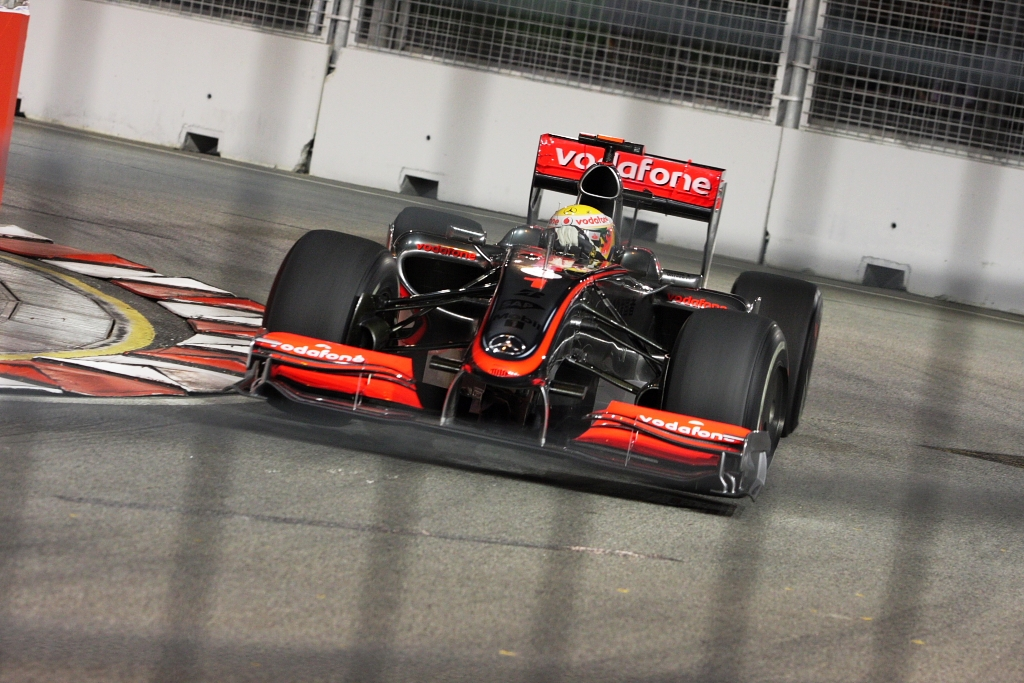
Lewis Hamilton was barely challenged throughout the race as he took the chequered flag.

This left Hamilton 9.2 seconds ahead of Glock, who was in turn 7.6 seconds ahead of Alonso as Vettel served his penalty on lap 43. Red Bull's afternoon went from bad to worse three laps later as Webber spun out at Turn 1 after a right-front brake failure.

McLaren brought in both Hamilton and Heikki Kovalainen for their second stops, and Timo Glock also pitted. The Safety Car was not deemed necessary to clear Webber's car, giving Jenson Button, who had been following Kovalainen, the opportunity to put in a series of fast laps before his pit stop. With Barrichello running in seventh after a small problem at his second pit stop, Button had an opportunity to stay ahead of his teammate and extend his Championship lead. He pitted on lap 51, emerging in a net fifth position behind the impressively recovering Vettel and ahead of Barrichello.

Button seemed to have the speed to catch Vettel, who was concerned about his brakes following the retirement of Webber as well as that of Alguersuari, of Red Bull's sister team Toro Rosso, also with brake problems. Button closed the gap to under two seconds before he too appeared to develop brake problems. Fortunately for Button, his attempts to catch Vettel had given him a ten-second cushion over Barrichello with two laps to go.

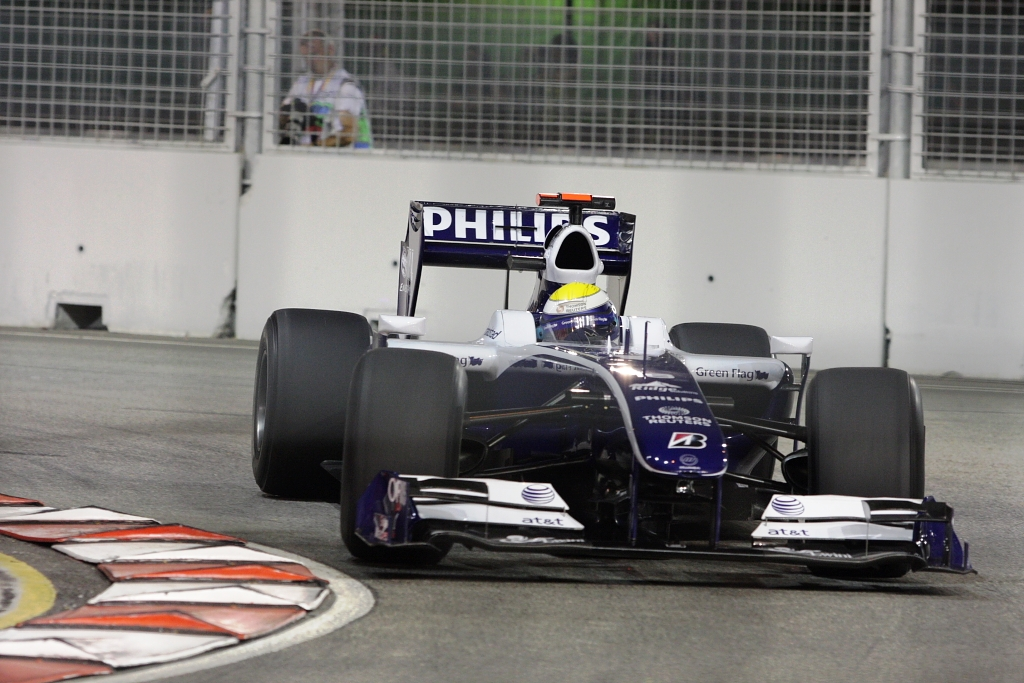
Nico Rosberg received a drive-through penalty after he crossed the white line at the pit exit.

Nearly two hours after the race started, Hamilton completed the final lap to take the chequered flag, ahead of Glock and Alonso. Vettel and Button held on for fourth and fifth respectively, ahead of Barrichello, Kovalainen and Robert Kubica in the final points paying position. Button extended his Championship lead by one point to 15 ahead of Barrichello, with just three races remaining. Vettel was 25 points behind Button while Webber's crash meant he was now officially out of the running for the World Championship. Brawn would need 12 points from the remaining three races to clinch the Constructors' Championship, while Ferrari's poor race, with neither driver scoring points, allowed McLaren to close the gap to Ferrari to three points in the battle for third.

Under Bernie Ecclestone's proposed 'winner takes all' medals system, Button would have been declared World Champion after this result, with no other driver able to match his tally of six race wins. The Olympics-style system was planned to be used to decide the 2009 World Champion but was dropped after pressure from teams in favour of the traditional points method.

== Classification ==
=== Qualifying ===
Cars that use the KERS system are marked with "‡"

Pos	No	Driver	Constructor	Part 1	Part 2	Part 3	Grid
1	1‡	(United Kingdom) Lewis Hamilton	McLaren-Mercedes	1:46.977	1:46.657	1:47.891	1
2	15	(Germany) Sebastian Vettel	Red Bull-Renault	1:47.541	1:46.362	1:48.204	2
3	16	(Germany) Nico Rosberg	Williams-Toyota	1:47.390	1:46.197	1:48.348	3
4	14	(Australia) Mark Webber	Red Bull-Renault	1:47.646	1:46.328	1:48.722	4
5	23	(Brazil) Rubens Barrichello	Brawn-Mercedes	1:47.397	1:46.787	1:48.828	9^{1}
6	7	(Spain) Fernando Alonso	Renault	1:47.757	1:46.767	1:49.054	5
7	10	(Germany) Timo Glock	Toyota	1:47.770	1:46.707	1:49.180	6
8	6	(Germany) Nick Heidfeld	BMW Sauber	1:47.347	1:46.832	1:49.307	20^{2}
9	5	(Poland) Robert Kubica	BMW Sauber	1:47.615	1:46.813	1:49.514	7
10	2‡	(Finland) Heikki Kovalainen	McLaren-Mercedes	1:47.542	1:46.842	1:49.778	8
11	17	(Japan) Kazuki Nakajima	Williams-Toyota	1:47.637	1:47.013		10
12	22	(United Kingdom) Jenson Button	Brawn-Mercedes	1:47.180	1:47.141		11
13	4‡	(Finland) Kimi Räikkönen	Ferrari	1:47.293	1:47.177		12
14	12	(Switzerland) Sébastien Buemi	Toro Rosso-Ferrari	1:47.677	1:47.369		13
15	9	(Italy) Jarno Trulli	Toyota	1:47.690	1:47.413		14
16	20	(Germany) Adrian Sutil	Force India-Mercedes	1:48.231			15
17	11	(Spain) Jaime Alguersuari	Toro Rosso-Ferrari	1:48.340			16
18	3‡	(Italy) Giancarlo Fisichella	Ferrari	1:48.350			17
19	8	(France) Romain Grosjean	Renault	1:48.544			18
20	21	(Italy) Vitantonio Liuzzi	Force India-Mercedes	1:48.792			19
Source:^{,}

Notes

- ^1 – Rubens Barrichello was given a five-place grid penalty for a gearbox change prior to qualifying.
- ^2 – Nick Heidfeld was excluded from the qualifying results for an underweight car. He has also had gearbox and engine change prior to race, and he started from the pit lane.

=== Race ===
Cars that ran KERS are marked with "‡"

Pos	No	Driver	Constructor	Laps	Time/Retired	Grid	Points
1	1‡	(United Kingdom) Lewis Hamilton	McLaren-Mercedes	61	1:56:06.337	1	10
2	10	(Germany) Timo Glock	Toyota	61	+9.634	6	8
3	7	(Spain) Fernando Alonso	Renault	61	+16.624	5	6
4	15	(Germany) Sebastian Vettel	Red Bull-Renault	61	+20.621	2	5
5	22	(United Kingdom) Jenson Button	Brawn-Mercedes	61	+30.015	11	4
6	23	(Brazil) Rubens Barrichello	Brawn-Mercedes	61	+31.858	9	3
7	2‡	(Finland) Heikki Kovalainen	McLaren-Mercedes	61	+36.157	8	2
8	5	(Poland) Robert Kubica	BMW Sauber	61	+55.054	7	1
9	17	(Japan) Kazuki Nakajima	Williams-Toyota	61	+56.054	10	
10	4‡	(Finland) Kimi Räikkönen	Ferrari	61	+58.892	12	
11	16	(Germany) Nico Rosberg	Williams-Toyota	61	+59.777	3	
12	9	(Italy) Jarno Trulli	Toyota	61	+1:13.009	14	
13	3‡	(Italy) Giancarlo Fisichella	Ferrari	61	+1:19.890	17	
14	21	(Italy) Vitantonio Liuzzi	Force India-Mercedes	61	+1:33.502	19	
Ret	11	(Spain) Jaime Alguersuari	Toro Rosso-Ferrari	47	Brakes	16	
Ret	12	(Switzerland) Sébastien Buemi	Toro Rosso-Ferrari	47	Gearbox	13	
Ret	14	(Australia) Mark Webber	Red Bull-Renault	45	Brakes/accident	4	
Ret	20	(Germany) Adrian Sutil	Force India-Mercedes	23	Collision damage	15	
Ret	6	(Germany) Nick Heidfeld	BMW Sauber	19	Collision	PL^{3}	
Ret	8	(France) Romain Grosjean	Renault	3	Brakes	18	

Notes

- ^3 – Nick Heidfeld started the race from the pit lane.

== Championship standings after the race ==
Drivers' Championship standings

Pos.	Driver	Points
1	(United Kingdom) Jenson Button*	84
2	(Brazil) Rubens Barrichello*	69
3	(Germany) Sebastian Vettel*	59
4	(Australia) Mark Webber	51.5
5	(Finland) Kimi Räikkönen	40

Constructors' Championship standings

Pos.	Constructor	Points
1	(United Kingdom) Brawn-Mercedes*	153
2	(Austria) Red Bull-Renault*	110.5
3	(Italy) Ferrari	62
4	(United Kingdom) McLaren-Mercedes	59
5	(Japan) Toyota	46.5

- Note: Only the top five positions are included for both sets of standings.
- Bold text and an asterisk indicates competitors who still had a theoretical chance of becoming World Champion.

== F1 Rocks Singapore With LG ==
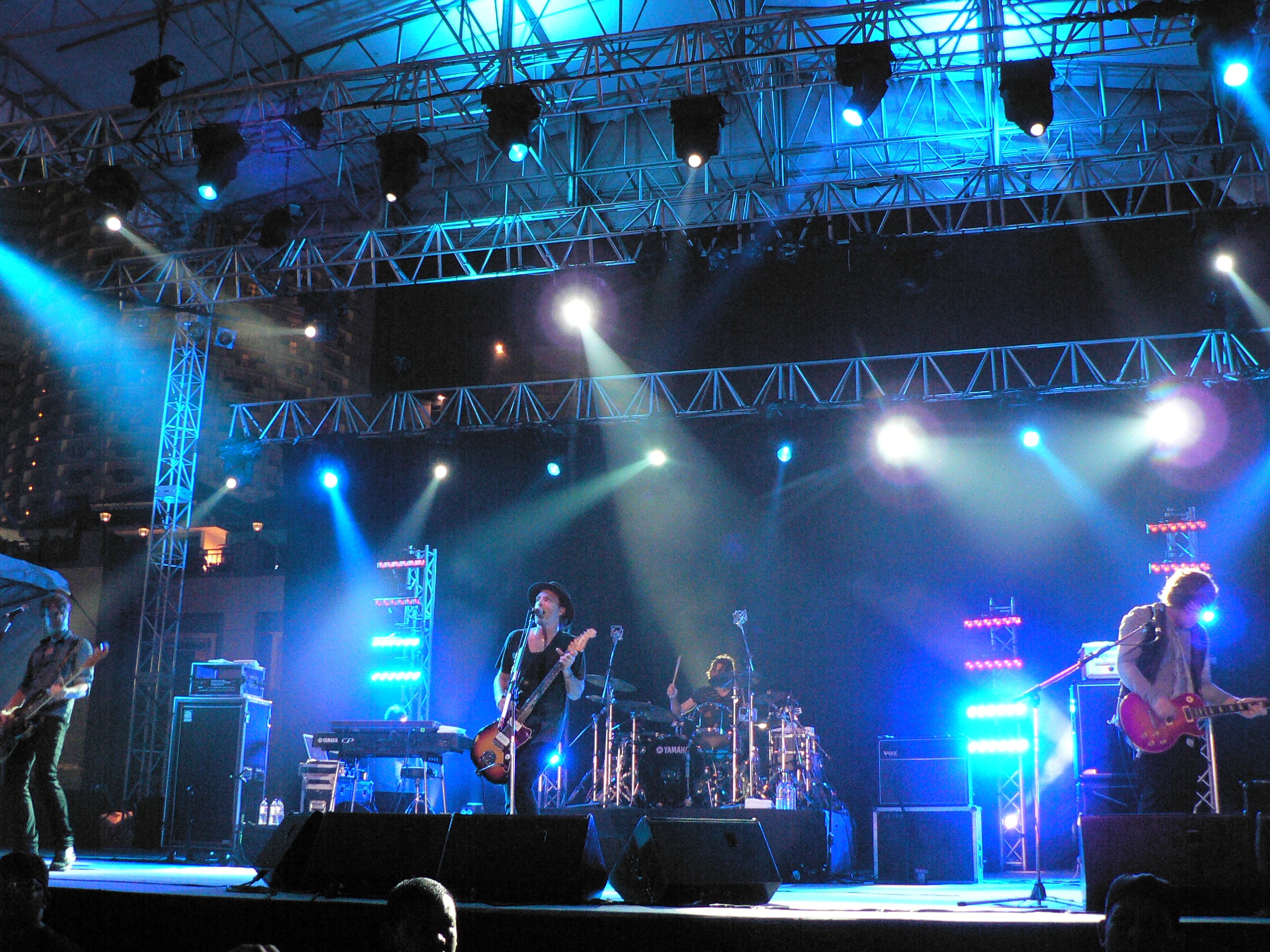
Singapore was the first venue for the F1 Rocks concerts.

The inaugural F1 Rocks concerts was held in Singapore. Headlining acts include Beyoncé, The Black Eyed Peas, ZZ Top, Simple Minds, N.E.R.D., No Doubt, Jacky Cheung and A*Mei which took place 24 to 26 September nightly at Fort Canning Park. This also included Mark Webber, Sebastian Vettel and Jenson Button participating in fun challenges, and was hosted by Lindsay Lohan.

== Fuel Festival Singapore ==
Another massive SingaporeGP Season event Fuel Festival featured headliners Underworld, will.i.am, Peter Hook ex-New Order, Bloc Party, Guru Josh, Darren Emerson, Freaks, Hybrid, Samantha Ronson, and Johnny Vicious and was hosted by Lindsay Lohan which takes place 24 September at Suntec Convention Centre as well as 25 to 27 September nightly at the National Museum of Singapore.

Singapore GP itself offered a showcase featuring Backstreet Boys, Travis, Carl Cox, and John Digweed on the 25th through 27th nightly throughout the track side areas.

Previous race: 2009 Italian Grand Prix	FIA Formula One World Championship; 2009 season	Next race: 2009 Japanese Grand Prix
Previous race: 2008 Singapore Grand Prix	Singapore Grand Prix	Next race: 2010 Singapore Grand Prix
