= 2009 Brazilian Grand Prix =

Race 16 of 17 in the 2009 Formula One World Championship
← Previous race	Next race →

Race details
- Date: 18 October 2009
- Official name: Formula 1 Grande Prêmio Petrobras do Brasil 2009
- Location: Autódromo José Carlos Pace, São Paulo, Brazil
- Course: Permanent racing facility
- Course length: 4.309 km (2.677 miles)
- Distance: 71 laps, 305.909 km (190.083 miles)
- Weather: Partially cloudy and dry

Pole position
Driver	(Brazil) Rubens Barrichello	Brawn-Mercedes
- Time: 1:19.576

Fastest lap
Driver	(Australia) Mark Webber	Red Bull-Renault
- Time: 1:13.733 on lap 25

Podium
First	(Australia) Mark Webber	Red Bull-Renault
Second	(Poland) Robert Kubica	BMW Sauber
Third	(United Kingdom) Lewis Hamilton	McLaren-Mercedes

The 2009 Brazilian Grand Prix (formally the Formula 1 Grande Prêmio Petrobras do Brasil 2009) was a Formula One motor race held at the Autódromo José Carlos Pace, São Paulo, Brazil on 18 October 2009. It was the sixteenth race of the 2009 Formula One World Championship.

The 71-lap race was won by Mark Webber, driving a Red Bull-Renault. Webber took his second victory of the season, and the second of his career, by 7.6 seconds from Robert Kubica in a BMW Sauber, with Lewis Hamilton third in a McLaren-Mercedes. Jenson Button finished fifth in his Brawn-Mercedes to secure his first and only Drivers' Championship, while Brawn GP sealed the Constructors' Championship.

== Background ==
Local favourite Felipe Massa won the 2008 Brazilian Grand Prix for Ferrari as Lewis Hamilton picked up the World Championship for McLaren by overtaking Timo Glock on the last corner of the race for 5th. Massa also won the race in 2006, and was runner-up to teammate Kimi Räikkönen in 2007 as the Finn took the World Championship. The World title had been won at Interlagos for the previous 4 years, with Hamilton, Räikkönen and Fernando Alonso (twice) taking the title. Alonso has never won the Brazilian GP, however, with Juan Pablo Montoya and Massa winning the 2005 and 2006 races respectively. Another former Brazilian Grand Prix winner lining up was Giancarlo Fisichella, who won in 2003.

The race has a history of home success, with Massa, Ayrton Senna, Nelson Piquet Sr, Carlos Pace and Emerson Fittipaldi winning. Rubens Barrichello aimed for his first win at Interlagos, hoping to improve on his previous best placing of 3rd in 2004. Massa had targeted a return after injuries sustained in an accident in qualifying in the 2009 Hungarian Grand Prix, but this was not possible. Massa instead was given the honour of waving the chequered flag at the end of the race.

Championship leader Jenson Button needed to finish within four points of teammate Barrichello to seal the 2009 drivers' title. Red Bull's Sebastian Vettel needed to finish first or second in order to stay in the running for the title fight. In the constructors' standings, Brawn GP required just half a point to be declared champions, while Red Bull Racing needed to finish first and second in both Brazil and Abu Dhabi with Brawn not scoring in either round to take the title for themselves.

GP2 driver and Toyota test driver Kamui Kobayashi replaced Toyota's Timo Glock after tests revealed that he had cracked a vertebra in his qualifying accident at the previous race at Suzuka.

Tyre supplier Bridgestone selected the medium and supersoft tyres for the Grand Prix weekend.

=== Championship permuations ===
Jenson Button had an opportunity to secure his first World Drivers' Championship in Brazil.

	Button would have won if:		
	(United Kingdom) Jenson Button	(Brazil) Rubens Barrichello	(Germany) Sebastian Vettel
Pos.	3rd or better	Does not matter	
Pos.	4th or 5th	2nd or lower	Does not matter
Pos.	6th or 7th	3rd or lower	2nd or lower
Pos.	8th	4th or lower	3rd or lower
Pos.	9th or lower	5th or lower	3rd or lower

== Qualifying report ==
Qualifying was dominated by a tropical storm that would interrupt the session for over an hour, and made the session last 2 hours and 41 minutes, the longest qualifying session in the history of F1. The first session saw the elimination of Giancarlo Fisichella, both McLaren cars and championship contender Sebastian Vettel; Nick Heidfeld joined them as the fifth and final car eliminated. The rains set in after the first session, delaying qualifying until the circuit could be declared safe. Nico Rosberg topped the timing sheets with a lap time of 1:22.828.

When the weather had cleared and the cars eventually re-emerged, Rosberg would once again come out on top. The session was almost immediately red-flagged with Vitantonio Liuzzi crashing heavily at the first corner. Unable to set a time, he was subsequently eliminated. Q2 also saw the elimination of championship leader Jenson Button down in fourteenth and behind Jaime Alguersuari, Kamui Kobayashi and Romain Grosjean, the three least-experienced drivers in the field.

For the first time since the knockout qualifying system was introduced, the third and final ten-minute session was contested by drivers from nine of the ten teams, the only exclusion being McLaren, with both Hamilton and Kovalainen having been knocked out in the first session; Williams were the only team to field two cars in the final session. Jenson Button's closest championship rival and teammate Rubens Barrichello took his first pole since the 2004 Brazilian Grand Prix at the same track, on a drying circuit with a 1:19.576, but the release of the post-qualifying car weights revealed him to be the lightest car on the grid. It would also be his final pole and also the last pole for his team.

=== Qualifying classification ===
Cars that use the KERS system are marked with "‡"

Pos.	No.	Driver	Constructor	Qualifying times			Final grid
Pos.	No.	Driver	Constructor	Q1	Q2	Q3	Final grid
1	23	(Brazil) Rubens Barrichello	Brawn-Mercedes	1:24.100	1:21.659	1:19.576	1
2	14	(Australia) Mark Webber	Red Bull-Renault	1:24.722	1:20.803	1:19.668	2
3	20	(Germany) Adrian Sutil	Force India-Mercedes	1:24.447	1:20.753	1:19.912	3
4	9	(Italy) Jarno Trulli	Toyota	1:24.621	1:20.635	1:20.097	4
5	4‡	(Finland) Kimi Räikkönen	Ferrari	1:23.047	1:21.378	1:20.168	5
6	12	(Switzerland) Sébastien Buemi	Toro Rosso-Ferrari	1:24.591	1:20.701	1:20.250	6
7	16	(Germany) Nico Rosberg	Williams-Toyota	1:22.828	1:20.368	1:20.326	7
8	5	(Poland) Robert Kubica	BMW Sauber	1:23.072	1:21.147	1:20.631	8
9	17	(Japan) Kazuki Nakajima	Williams-Toyota	1:23.161	1:20.427	1:20.674	9
10	7	(Spain) Fernando Alonso	Renault	1:24.842	1:21.657	1:21.422	10
11	10	(Japan) Kamui Kobayashi	Toyota	1:24.335	1:21.960	N/A	11
12	11	(Spain) Jaime Alguersuari	Toro Rosso-Ferrari	1:24.773	1:22.231	N/A	12
13	8	(France) Romain Grosjean	Renault	1:24.394	1:22.477	N/A	13
14	22	(United Kingdom) Jenson Button	Brawn-Mercedes	1:24.297	1:22.504	N/A	14
15	21	(Italy) Vitantonio Liuzzi	Force India-Mercedes	1:24.645	No time	N/A	20^{1}
16	15	(Germany) Sebastian Vettel	Red Bull-Renault	1:25.009	N/A	N/A	15
17	2‡	(Finland) Heikki Kovalainen	McLaren-Mercedes	1:25.052	N/A	N/A	16
18	1‡	(United Kingdom) Lewis Hamilton	McLaren-Mercedes	1:25.192	N/A	N/A	17
19	6	(Germany) Nick Heidfeld	BMW Sauber	1:25.515	N/A	N/A	18
20	3‡	(Italy) Giancarlo Fisichella	Ferrari	1:40.703	N/A	N/A	19

1. – Vitantonio Liuzzi received a five-place grid penalty for a gearbox change.

== Race report ==
The opening lap was dominated by three separate incidents. Heikki Kovalainen made contact with Sebastian Vettel coming out of the Senna 'S', and while Vettel emerged unscathed, Kovalainen ran out of road and very nearly collected Fisichella, who was forced to go the long way around. The second incident took place just two corners later when Jarno Trulli tangled with Adrian Sutil while trying to make a pass coming out of the fifth corner. Both the Toyota and the Force India were eliminated, with Sutil taking out Fernando Alonso in the process when the Renault driver was unable to avoid his out-of-control Force India, an incident which caused the deployment of the safety car. The third and final incident took place in the pit lane; after his encounter with Vettel, Heikki Kovalainen pitted, followed closely by Kimi Räikkönen, the latter having damaged his front wing after light contact with Mark Webber. Kovalainen was released from his pit while the fuel hose was still attached, taking it with him and with it, a spray of fuel. Räikkönen's exhaust ignited the spilt fuel in a fireball, but no one was injured and both drivers were able to continue once Brawn mechanics extricated the McLaren fuel hose from Kovalainen's car.

Pole-sitter Barrichello controlled the first phase of the race, though Mark Webber and Robert Kubica stayed in touch, just two and a half seconds adrift. Aided by the first-lap incidents and the safety car, Button was placed ninth at the end of the first lap. He proceeded to take Grosjean around the outside at Turn 6 and then Nakajima at the first corner once green-flag conditions resumed, before being held up by debutant Kamui Kobayashi. He was heard on the team radio voicing his displeasure at the newcomer's tactics in defending his line. When he finally cleared the Toyota driver, Button was able to build a lead of three and a half seconds on him in a single lap.

Barrichello was unable to sustain the pace needed to maintain his lead over Webber, and in the first round of pit stops, the home town driver was passed by the Australian before coming under fire from Robert Kubica. Meanwhile, Lewis Hamilton — having started seventeenth — had pitted on the first lap and removed the softer tyre compound as his team switched him to a one-stop strategy. Other incidents early in the race saw Nick Heidfeld run out of fuel after his fuel-rig malfunctioned, whilst Kobayashi's blocking tactics removed fellow countryman Kazuki Nakajima's front wing, and the Williams driver crashed heavily at the fourth corner. His teammate Nico Rosberg had succumbed to gearbox troubles a few laps earlier.

The second stage of the race saw Button leading a group of four one-stopping drivers, with their ultimate success or failures having consequences on the championship standings given Barrichello's position. Both Hamilton and then Vettel successfully leap-frogged Button after Button's second stop and the Briton was caught behind Kovalainen, though a fading Rubens Barrichello was in a position such that had the race ended there and then, Button would still be declared World Champion. Button inherited sixth position when Kovalainen pitted, while Hamilton managed a pass down the inside of Barrichello into the first corner that inadvertently damaged the Brazilian's tyre, causing a puncture and forcing him to pit. He resumed in eighth, with Vettel's fourth placing meaning that, barring a dramatic turn in events, Button would be the 2009 World Champion even if he retired.

Mark Webber, who had led unchallenged since the first stops, went on to win the race, with Robert Kubica securing BMW Sauber's first podium since Malaysia. It turned out to be team Sauber's last podium, as well the last for BMW as an engine supplier before pulling out Formula One. Lewis Hamilton's pass on Barrichello was good enough to net him third place and see McLaren overtake Ferrari for third in the constructors' standings. Sebastian Vettel was fourth when he needed to be first or second to continue the championship fight in Abu Dhabi, while Button's fifth place from fourteenth on the grid was enough for him to secure the 2009 World Championship, becoming the tenth British champion and the first British champion to succeed another since 1969, when Jackie Stewart succeeded Graham Hill as World Champion. He also became the second driver in succession to win a World Championship by finishing fifth in Brazil whilst driving a Mercedes-powered car carrying the number 22. Button used only one chassis over the course of the season (most drivers change chassis several times), having driven it in every practice and qualifying session and race, meaning that he won the World Championship in the oldest car on the grid. Kimi Räikkönen, Sebastien Buemi and Rubens Barrichello rounded out the minor points placings.

Felipe Massa was the chequered flag waver in this Grand Prix. The podium trophies were of an unusual three-pronged design and matt-turquoise in colour. They were designed by the architect Oscar Niemeyer and were constructed of recycled plastic bottle tops, collected on site over the course of the Grand Prix weekend, and remoulded at the site's plastic recycling plant. The initiative is to highlight sponsor Petrobras' green credentials.

=== Race classification ===
Cars that use the KERS system are marked with "‡"

Pos	No	Driver	Constructor	Laps	Time/Retired	Grid	Points
1	14	(Australia) Mark Webber	Red Bull-Renault	71	1:32:23.081	2	10
2	5	(Poland) Robert Kubica	BMW Sauber	71	+ 7.626	8	8
3	1‡	(United Kingdom) Lewis Hamilton	McLaren-Mercedes	71	+ 18.944	17	6
4	15	(Germany) Sebastian Vettel	Red Bull-Renault	71	+ 19.652	15	5
5	22	(United Kingdom) Jenson Button	Brawn-Mercedes	71	+ 29.005	14	4
6	4‡	(Finland) Kimi Räikkönen	Ferrari	71	+ 33.340	5	3
7	12	(Switzerland) Sébastien Buemi	Toro Rosso-Ferrari	71	+ 35.991	6	2
8	23	(Brazil) Rubens Barrichello	Brawn-Mercedes	71	+ 45.454	1	1
9	10	(Japan) Kamui Kobayashi	Toyota	71	+ 1:03.324	11	
10	3‡	(Italy) Giancarlo Fisichella	Ferrari	71	+ 1:10.665	19	
11	21	(Italy) Vitantonio Liuzzi	Force India-Mercedes	71	+ 1:11.388	20	
12	2‡	(Finland) Heikki Kovalainen	McLaren-Mercedes	71	+ 1:13.499^{2}	16	
13	8	(France) Romain Grosjean	Renault	70	+ 1 Lap	13	
14	11	(Spain) Jaime Alguersuari	Toro Rosso-Ferrari	70	+ 1 Lap	12	
Ret	17	(Japan) Kazuki Nakajima	Williams-Toyota	30	Collision	9	
Ret	16	(Germany) Nico Rosberg	Williams-Toyota	27	Gearbox	7	
Ret	6	(Germany) Nick Heidfeld	BMW Sauber	21	Fuel system	18	
Ret	20	(Germany) Adrian Sutil	Force India-Mercedes	0	Collision	3	
Ret	9	(Italy) Jarno Trulli	Toyota	0	Collision	4	
Ret	7	(Spain) Fernando Alonso	Renault	0	Collision	10	

2. – Heikki Kovalainen received a 25-second time penalty for an unsafe release from his first pit stop.

== Championship standings after the race ==
Drivers' Championship standings

	Pos.	Driver	Points
	1	(United Kingdom) **Jenson Button**	89
1	2	(Germany) Sebastian Vettel	74
1	3	(Brazil) Rubens Barrichello	72
	4	(Australia) Mark Webber	61.5
1	5	(United Kingdom) Lewis Hamilton	49

Constructors' Championship standings

	Pos.	Constructor	Points
	1	(United Kingdom) **Brawn-Mercedes**	161
	2	(Austria) Red Bull-Renault	135.5
1	3	(United Kingdom) McLaren-Mercedes	71
1	4	(Italy) Ferrari	70
	5	(Japan) Toyota	54.5

- Note: Only the top five positions are included for both sets of standings.
- **Bold text** indicates the 2009 World Champions.

Previous race: 2009 Japanese Grand Prix	FIA Formula One World Championship; 2009 season	Next race: 2009 Abu Dhabi Grand Prix
Previous race: 2008 Brazilian Grand Prix	Brazilian Grand Prix	Next race: 2010 Brazilian Grand Prix
