= 2009 Japanese Grand Prix =

Coordinates: 34°50′35″N 136°32′26″E

Race 15 of 17 in the 2009 Formula One World Championship
← Previous race	Next race →
- The Suzuka circuit

Race details
- Date: 4 October 2009
- Official name: 2009 Formula 1 Fuji Television Japanese Grand Prix
- Location: Suzuka Circuit, Suzuka, Mie, Japan
- Course: Permanent racing facility
- Course length: 5.807 km (3.608 miles)
- Distance: 53 laps, 307.573 km (191.117 miles)
- Weather: Sunny, Dry
- Attendance: 210,000

Pole position
Driver	(Germany) Sebastian Vettel	Red Bull-Renault
- Time: 1:32.160

Fastest lap
Driver	(Australia) Mark Webber	Red Bull-Renault
- Time: 1:32.569 on lap 50

Podium
First	(Germany) Sebastian Vettel	Red Bull-Renault
Second	(Italy) Jarno Trulli	Toyota
Third	(United Kingdom) Lewis Hamilton	McLaren-Mercedes

The 2009 Japanese Grand Prix (formally the 2009 Formula 1 Fuji Television Japanese Grand Prix) was the fifteenth round of the 2009 FIA Formula One World Championship. The race was held at the Suzuka Circuit on 4 October 2009.

Sebastian Vettel of Red Bull won the race ahead of Toyota's Jarno Trulli and 2008 World Champion Lewis Hamilton, leading through the whole race. This was the last podium for both Toyota and Jarno Trulli in Formula One.

With two races remaining in the 2009 season, Vettel's win maintained his slim hopes of winning the Drivers Championship, with Championship leader Jenson Button finishing eighth, one place behind Rubens Barrichello. The result left Button and Barrichello's Brawn team half a point away from clinching the Constructors Championship.

== Report ==
=== Background ===
Jenson Button led Brawn GP teammate Rubens Barrichello by 15 points going into the race, with Sebastian Vettel 10 points further back driving for Red Bull Racing. Mark Webber could no longer win the Championship.

Brawn also led Red Bull by 42½ points in the Constructors' Championship, and only needed to maintain this lead to take the trophy. McLaren and Ferrari were 3 points apart in the Constructors' Championship in 3rd and 4th, with their lead drivers Lewis Hamilton and Kimi Räikkönen also separated by 3 points in 5th and 6th in the Drivers' Championship; Ferrari led on both counts.

Fernando Alonso won the 2008 Japanese Grand Prix for Renault, which was held at Fuji Speedway. Alonso also won the last race at Suzuka, in 2006. Other former winners lining up include Brawn GP's Rubens Barrichello, Ferrari's Kimi Räikkönen and World Champion Lewis Hamilton. It was the first time since 1991 that a Schumacher (Michael or Ralf) was not on the grid at Suzuka.

Eight of the drivers had not raced at Suzuka in Formula One before, owing to the Fuji Speedway having hosted the Japanese Grand Prix in 2007 and 2008. Those drivers included Lewis Hamilton, Sebastian Vettel, Heikki Kovalainen, local driver Kazuki Nakajima, Adrian Sutil, Sébastien Buemi, Jaime Alguersuari and Romain Grosjean. However, both Vettel and Sutil had driven the circuit in practice sessions before when they served as test drivers in 2006.

The 2009 Japanese Grand Prix saw Lewis Hamilton, Heikki Kovalainen and Adrian Sutil all start their fiftieth race in Formula One.

Tyre supplier Bridgestone selected the hard and soft tyres for the Grand Prix weekend.

=== Practice ===
The Friday practice sessions were dominated by heavy rain that severely reduced running time. Toyota's Timo Glock was advised not to drive as he was suffering from a fever, and was replaced by GP2 Series driver Kamui Kobayashi.

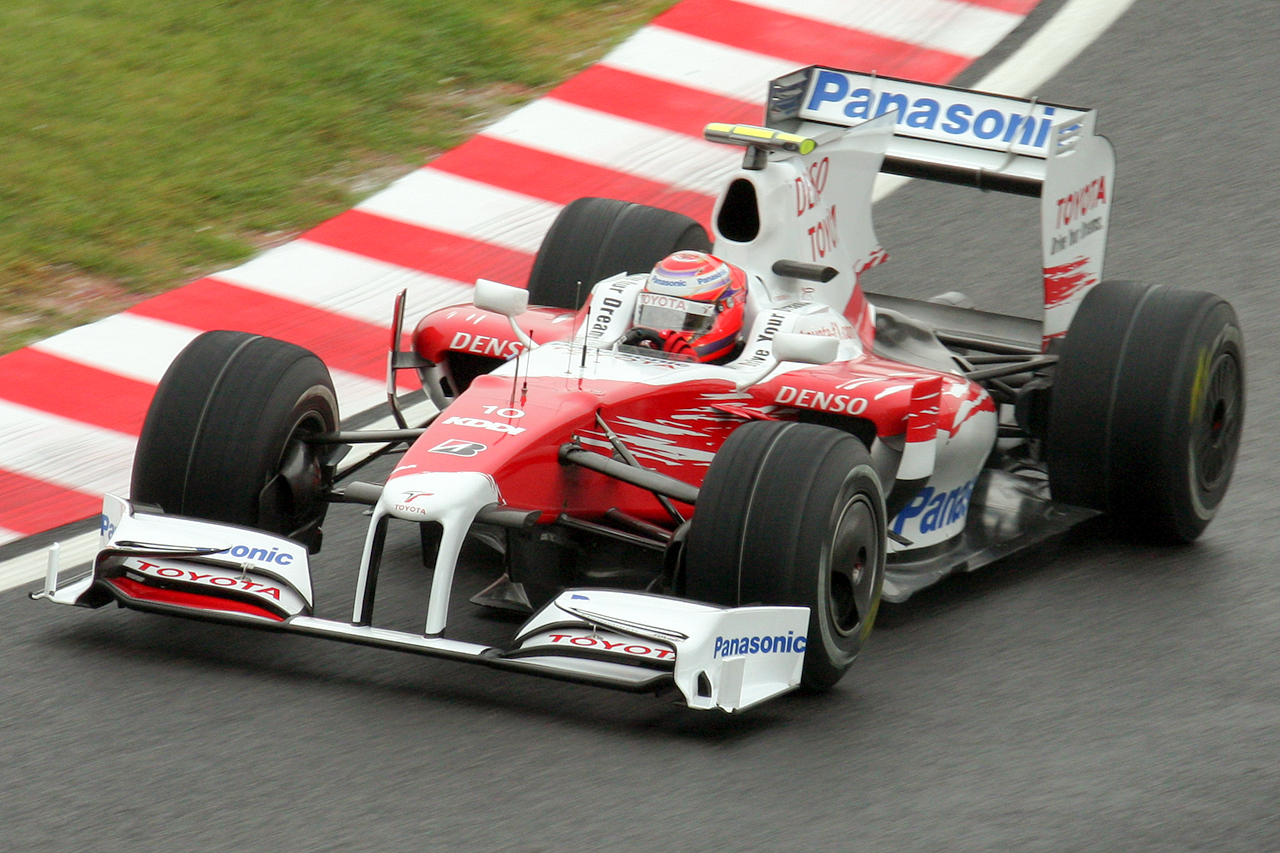
Kamui Kobayashi filled in for Timo Glock during Friday practice.

The first practice session saw Sebastian Vettel and Lewis Hamilton set the early pace, with lap times rapidly falling as the track dried out. The second half of the session was dominated by local driver Kazuki Nakajima, who narrowly missed out on setting the fastest time after McLaren's Heikki Kovalainen set a time three tenths of a second quicker in the final phase. Championship contenders Rubens Barrichello, Sebastian Vettel and Jenson Button finished 10th, 17th and 18th respectively.

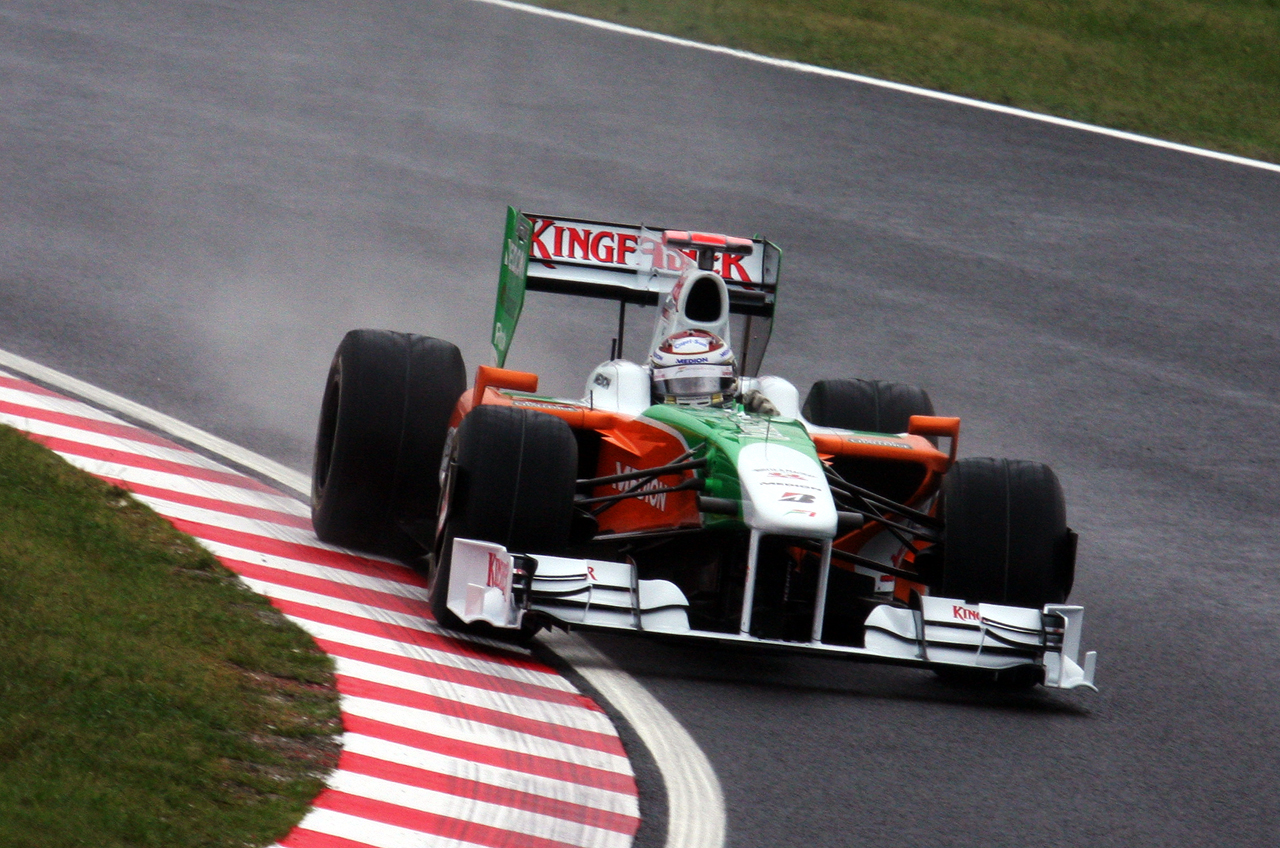
Adrian Sutil during the first practice session of the weekend, which was run in wet conditions.

The rain increased markedly for the second session, which saw very limited running in the first hour with Toro Rosso's Jaime Alguersuari and Sébastien Buemi being the only drivers to set times. Owing to poor visibility and limited tyre allocations, many of the drivers elected to do only a handful of laps; Nico Rosberg did just seven in comparison to the twenty he had done in the first session, a pattern followed by many other drivers. Heikki Kovalainen and both Brawn GP drivers elected not to take to the circuit. Adrian Sutil went on to set the fastest lap of the session with Sebastian Vettel in second, both of them some seven seconds slower than Kovalainen's first session time.

Saturday's third and final practice session started with contact between championship leader Button and Alguersuari that saw the Brawn driver require a replacement front wing. The session was largely dominated by Alguersuari's Toro Rosso stablemate Buemi, with fellow Red Bull compatriot Sebastian Vettel a close second until Jarno Trulli set a time six hundredths of a second quicker on his final lap. The hour-long session was dry, with Trulli's 1:31.709 almost ten seconds faster than Heikki Kovalainen's FP1 time and 17 seconds quicker than Adrian Sutil in FP2. At the end of the hour, championship contenders Vettel, Barrichello and Button were fourth, seventh and ninth respectively and separated by just over two hundredths of a second; just one second ultimately covered the top 16 drivers. Elsewhere, Timo Glock returned to his seat whilst Romain Grosjean out-paced Renault teammate Fernando Alonso. Red Bull's Mark Webber crashed near the Degner Corner, damaging his car to such an extent that he was unable to take part in qualifying. As the damage was heavy enough to require the chassis to be re-built, Webber had to start the race from the pit lane.

=== Qualifying ===
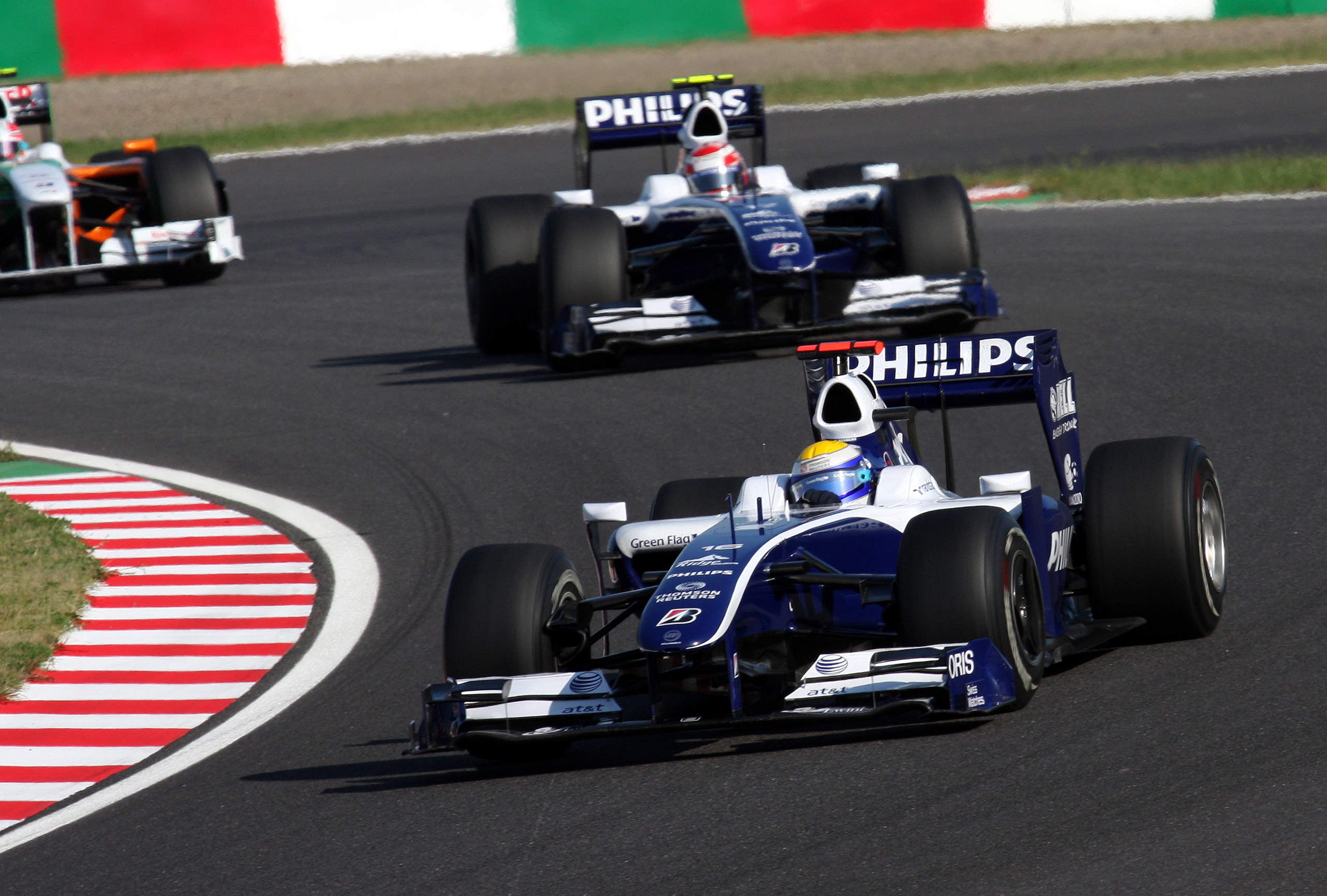
Nico Rosberg and Kazuki Nakajima qualified in 11th and 17th places respectively.

With Webber unable to take part in qualifying, only four drivers would be eliminated in the first session. An early spin into the barriers by Sébastien Buemi looked as if that number would become three, but his team repaired the car in time for him to do a single fast lap. The early pace-setter was Sebastian Vettel, who exchanged blows with the Toyota of Trulli before ultimately coming out on top by the end of the session. Meanwhile, Jaime Alguersuari made the second part of qualifying for the first time in his short career, with Giancarlo Fisichella, Kazuki Nakajima, Romain Grosjean and Vitantonio Liuzzi joining Webber in an early exit from qualifying. The second session was dominated by two accidents that both resulted in red flags. The first was Jaime Alguersuari, who speared off at the Degner Curve, the same place as Webber in the earlier practice session and the scene of Buemi's off-track excursion in the first segment of qualifying. The second accident was more serious, with Timo Glock crashing heavily at the final corner. The session was stopped for some time as medics attended to him and his car was removed. The session resumed with eight minutes remaining and saw a final push by the Brawn drivers to make it into the top ten shootout. The final moments were marked by another off by Buemi at Spoon, which left debris on the circuit as he limped back to the pits. Glock was flown by helicopter to hospital during Q3 with a wound on his left leg, and back pain. The times set by the Brawn drivers were threatened should someone protest following an incident where they set their best – and only – times during a yellow flag period.

Heikki Kovalainen joined the growing list of drivers who crashed at the Degner Curve early in the third part of qualifying, though the damage was minimal and the circuit quickly cleared. The damage to Sébastien Buemi's car after his earlier off was deemed too great to be able to repair in time, and like Kovalainen, he failed to set a time, meaning that Q3 would be contested by eight drivers. When the track had re-opened after Kovalainen's accident, there were just five minutes remaining on the clock. Sebastian Vettel once again topped the timing sheets, putting him in a strong position to keep his title campaign alive, while rival championship contenders Barrichello and Button could only manage fifth and seventh respectively. Jarno Trulli qualified the sole remaining Toyota in second in his team's home race, with reigning World Champion Lewis Hamilton in third.

After qualifying, Jenson Button, Rubens Barrichello, Nick Heidfeld, Robert Kubica, Fernando Alonso and Adrian Sutil were all called before the stewards on charges of speeding during the yellow-flag caused by Sébastien Buemi's off in the final moments of Q2. Buemi himself was later summoned on the charge of driving a damaged car. All of the drivers except for Heidfeld and Kubica were given five-place grid penalties.

Timo Glock was unable to take part in the race as a result of the injuries he sustained during qualifying. Toyota requested to have him replaced by Kobayashi, but this was refused by the stewards as the rules stipulated that a driver had to have taken part in a Saturday session to be eligible to race.

=== Race ===
Sebastian Vettel led the race from the start; aside from a brief attempt by Lewis Hamilton at passing him into the first corner, the Red Bull driver would remain relatively unthreatened. The opening lap was clean, with the only major changes in position coming from Sébastien Buemi, who nearly stalled, and Jenson Button, who fell from 10th down to 12th behind the BMW Sauber of Robert Kubica and the Ferrari of Giancarlo Fisichella. Button subsequently reclaimed those positions within the opening laps.

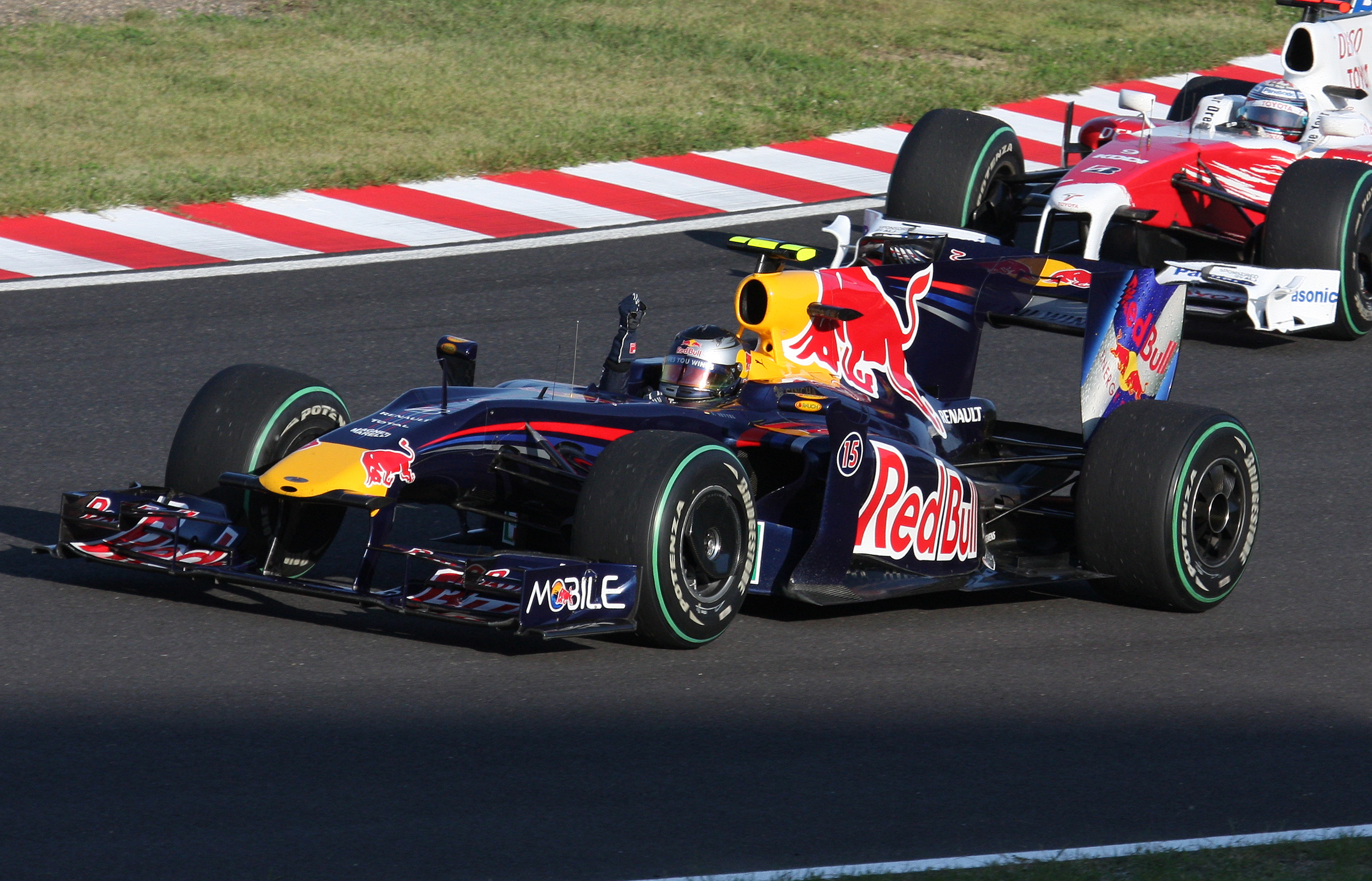
Sebastian Vettel won the race, leading every lap after starting from pole position.

Hamilton slotted into second place while Jarno Trulli assumed third. Further back, Mark Webber, having started from the pit lane, pitted three times in the opening four laps; the first two due to his headrest coming loose, and the third for new tyres after he picked up a puncture. Most of the overtaking in the early stages of the Grand Prix took place with the first wave of stops, Vettel remaining unchallenged for the lead. An incident at the Casio Triangle saw Adrian Sutil and Heikki Kovalainen collide at relatively low speed, allowing championship leader Button to sneak through into a points position.

The middle stint of the race was as quiet as the first, with the only passes being Kovalainen out-dragging Fisichella in the pit exit lane, and a mistake from Hamilton allowing Trulli to pass him as he emerged from the pits. A problem with the KERS unit on his car meant that Hamilton subsequently struggled to stay in touch with the Toyota driver. Meanwhile, the Toro Rosso drivers had not fared well, with a clutch problem spelling an early retirement for Buemi, whilst Jaime Alguersuari lost control after touching the astro turf on the outside of 130R which resulted in a spin into the tyre wall and the safety car being deployed ten laps from the end.

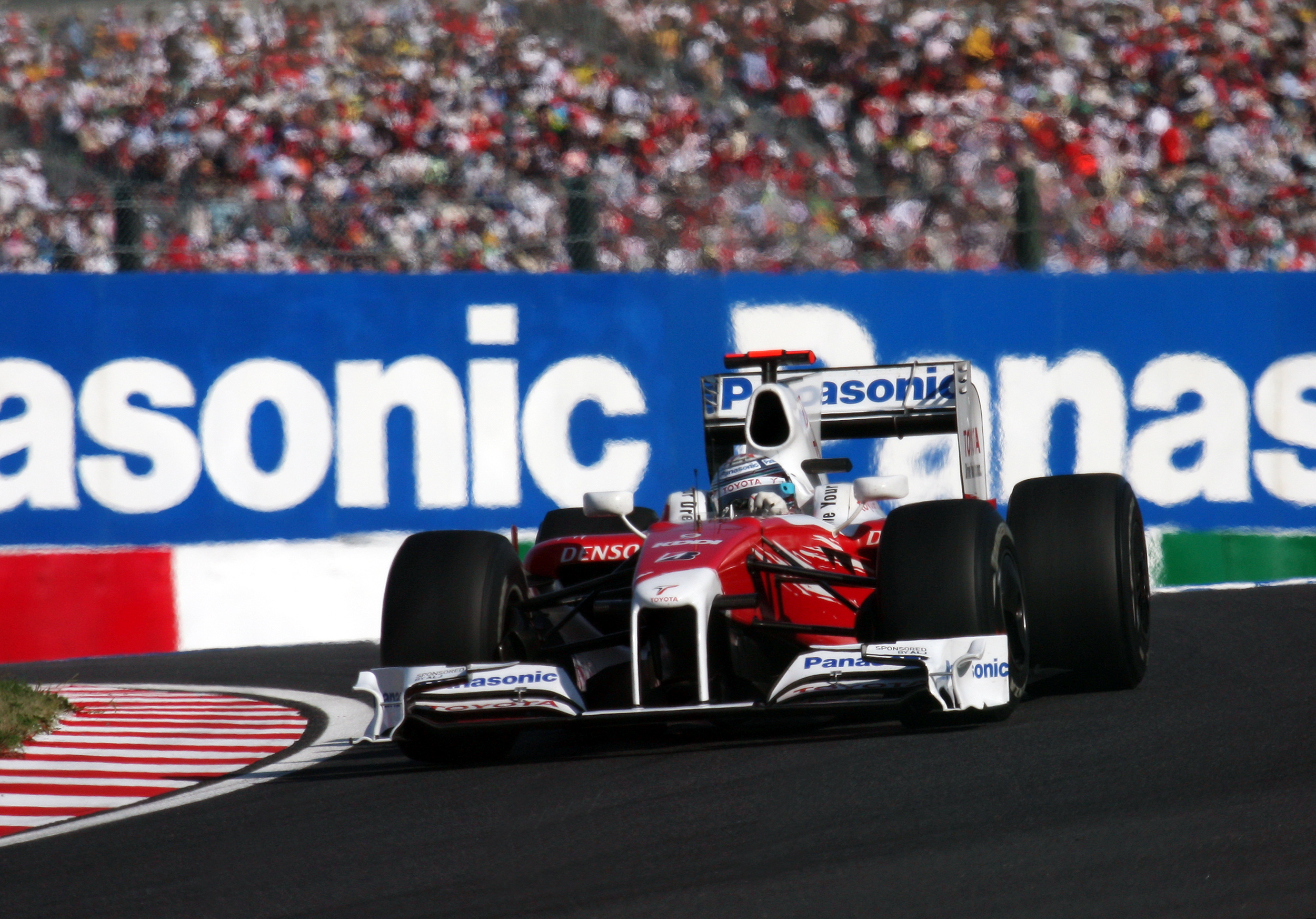
Jarno Trulli took second position at Toyota's home race. He also took Toyota's last podium, as well as his last podium. He was the last Italian to score a podium, until Andrea Kimi Antonelli finished third at the 2025 Canadian Grand Prix.

By the time the wreckage from Alguersuari's accident was cleared away and the track considered safe for racing once more, there were just five laps remaining. Vettel continued to put as much space between him and second place as possible, while ninth-placed Kubica threatened Jenson Button in an attempt to wrest the single championship point for eighth place away from him. Button prevailed after deciding not to challenge teammate Rubens Barrichello for seventh. He later protested to the stewards that Williams' Nico Rosberg had been speeding under the safety car – though Rosberg was acquitted after a stewards' hearing found mitigating circumstances.

Vettel ultimately won the race from Trulli and Hamilton with Kimi Räikkönen in fourth. Mark Webber, although down in last and 2 laps down, took the fastest lap on the last lap by 0.002 seconds to deny Vettel a Grand Chelem. His victory and subsequent ten championship points meant Vettel stayed in contention for the drivers' title, 16 points adrift of Button, who kept a 14-point lead over Barrichello going into the penultimate race. Vettel was confident he could make up the large points difference, saying his Red Bull team had the momentum, while Button admitted he would be focusing on an error-free end to the season to try to clinch his first Driver's title.

Trulli's podium was the last for an Italian Formula One driver until Kimi Antonelli took his maiden podium at the 2025 Canadian Grand Prix.

== Classification ==
=== Qualifying ===
Cars that use the KERS system are marked with "‡"

Pos	No	Driver	Constructor	Part 1	Part 2	Part 3	Grid
1	15	(Germany) Sebastian Vettel	Red Bull-Renault	1:30.883	1:30.341	1:32.160	1
2	9	(Italy) Jarno Trulli	Toyota	1:31.063	1:30.737	1:32.220	2
3	1‡	(United Kingdom) Lewis Hamilton	McLaren-Mercedes	1:30.917	1:30.627	1:32.395	3
4	20	(Germany) Adrian Sutil	Force India-Mercedes	1:31.386	1:31.222	1:32.466	8^{1}
5	23	(Brazil) Rubens Barrichello	Brawn-Mercedes	1:31.272	1:31.055	1:32.660	6^{1}
6	6	(Germany) Nick Heidfeld	BMW Sauber	1:31.501	1:31.260	1:32.945	4
7	22	(United Kingdom) Jenson Button	Brawn-Mercedes	1:31.041	1:30.880	1:32.962	10^{1}
8	4‡	(Finland) Kimi Räikkönen	Ferrari	1:31.288	1:31.052	1:32.980	5
9	2‡	(Finland) Heikki Kovalainen	McLaren-Mercedes	1:31.499	1:31.223	No time^{2}	11^{2}
10	12	(Switzerland) Sébastien Buemi	Toro Rosso-Ferrari	1:31.196	1:31.103	No time^{3}	13^{4}
11	16	(Germany) Nico Rosberg	Williams-Toyota	1:31.286	1:31.482		7
12	7	(Spain) Fernando Alonso	Renault	1:31.401	1:31.638		16^{1}
13	5	(Poland) Robert Kubica	BMW Sauber	1:31.417	1:32.341		9
14	10	(Germany) Timo Glock	Toyota	1:31.550	No time^{5}		WD
15	11	(Spain) Jaime Alguersuari	Toro Rosso-Ferrari	1:31.571	No time^{6}		12
16	3‡	(Italy) Giancarlo Fisichella	Ferrari	1:31.704			14
17	17	(Japan) Kazuki Nakajima	Williams-Toyota	1:31.718			15
18	8	(France) Romain Grosjean	Renault	1:32.073			17
19	21	(Italy) Vitantonio Liuzzi	Force India-Mercedes	1:32.087			18^{7}
20	14	(Australia) Mark Webber	Red Bull-Renault	No time^{8}			PL
Sources:

1. – Button, Barrichello, Alonso and Sutil were given five-place grid penalties for speeding under yellow conditions. These penalties were applied in the order that the infringements had been committed.
2. – Kovalainen crashed at the Degner Curve in Q3. He changed his gearbox after the session, resulting in a five-place grid penalty.
3. – Buemi crashed during the final moments of Q2 and was unable to set a time in Q3.
4. – Buemi was given a five-place grid penalty and a reprimand for driving a damaged car and impeding other drivers.
5. – Glock failed to set a time during Q2 after going off at the final corner. He was injured in the accident, and was withdrawn from the race on Sunday morning.
6. – Alguersuari crashed during the second phase of qualifying, prompting the session to be red-flagged.
7. – Liuzzi was given a five-place grid penalty for a gearbox change.
8. – Webber damaged his car in the final practice session and was unable to take to the circuit in qualifying. He started from the pit lane with a new chassis.

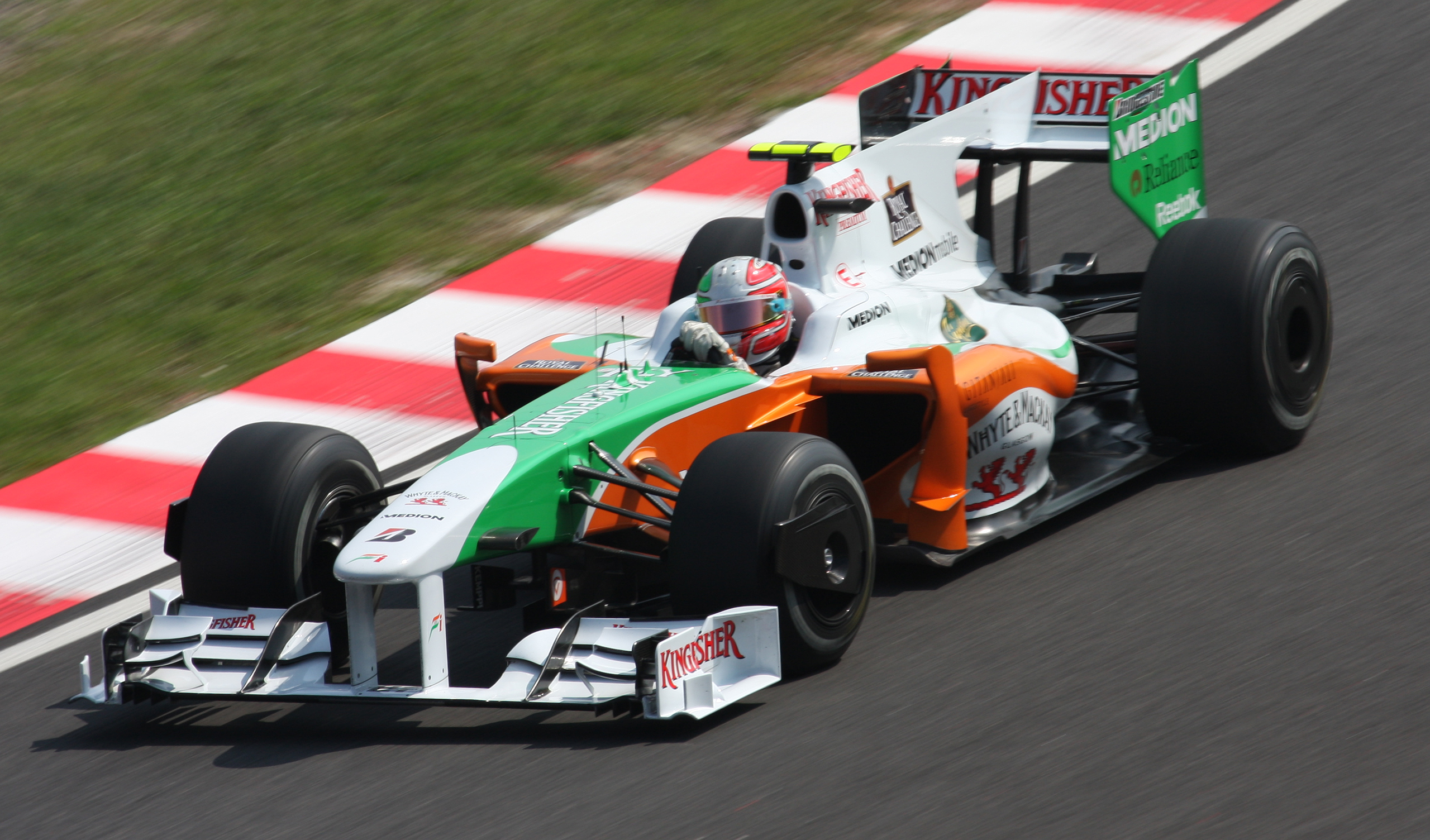
Force India driver Vitantonio Liuzzi finished the race in fourteenth position.

=== Race ===
Cars that use the KERS system are marked with "‡"

Pos	No	Driver	Constructor	Laps	Time/Retired	Grid	Points
1	15	(Germany) Sebastian Vettel	Red Bull-Renault	53	1:28:20.443	1	10
2	9	(Italy) Jarno Trulli	Toyota	53	+4.877	2	8
3	1‡	(United Kingdom) Lewis Hamilton	McLaren-Mercedes	53	+6.472	3	6
4	4‡	(Finland) Kimi Räikkönen	Ferrari	53	+7.940	5	5
5	16	(Germany) Nico Rosberg	Williams-Toyota	53	+8.793	7	4
6	6	(Germany) Nick Heidfeld	BMW Sauber	53	+9.509	4	3
7	23	(Brazil) Rubens Barrichello	Brawn-Mercedes	53	+10.641	6	2
8	22	(United Kingdom) Jenson Button	Brawn-Mercedes	53	+11.474	10	1
9	5	(Poland) Robert Kubica	BMW Sauber	53	+11.777	9	
10	7	(Spain) Fernando Alonso	Renault	53	+13.065	16	
11	2‡	(Finland) Heikki Kovalainen	McLaren-Mercedes	53	+13.735	11	
12	3‡	(Italy) Giancarlo Fisichella	Ferrari	53	+14.596	14	
13	20	(Germany) Adrian Sutil	Force India-Mercedes	53	+14.959	8	
14	21	(Italy) Vitantonio Liuzzi	Force India-Mercedes	53	+15.734	18	
15	17	(Japan) Kazuki Nakajima	Williams-Toyota	53	+17.973	15	
16	8	(France) Romain Grosjean	Renault	52	+1 Lap	17	
17	14	(Australia) Mark Webber	Red Bull-Renault	51	+2 Laps	19	
Ret	11	(Spain) Jaime Alguersuari	Toro Rosso-Ferrari	43	Accident	12	
Ret	12	(Switzerland) Sébastien Buemi	Toro Rosso-Ferrari	11	Clutch	13	
WD	10	(Germany) Timo Glock	Toyota	0	Driver Injured	WD	

- Timo Glock could not race due to injury

== Championship standings after the race ==
Drivers' Championship standings

Pos.	Driver	Points
1	(United Kingdom) Jenson Button*	85
2	(Brazil) Rubens Barrichello*	71
3	(Germany) Sebastian Vettel*	69
4	(Australia) Mark Webber	51.5
5	(Finland) Kimi Räikkönen	45

Constructors' Championship standings

Pos.	Constructor	Points
1	(United Kingdom) Brawn-Mercedes*	156
2	(Austria) Red Bull-Renault*	120.5
3	(Italy) Ferrari	67
4	(United Kingdom) McLaren-Mercedes	65
5	(Japan) Toyota	54.5

- Note: Only the top five positions are included for both sets of standings.
- Bold text and an asterisk indicates competitors who still had a theoretical chance of becoming World Champion.

Previous race: 2009 Singapore Grand Prix	FIA Formula One World Championship; 2009 season	Next race: 2009 Brazilian Grand Prix
Previous race: 2008 Japanese Grand Prix	Japanese Grand Prix	Next race: 2010 Japanese Grand Prix
