= Honda V8 F1 engine =

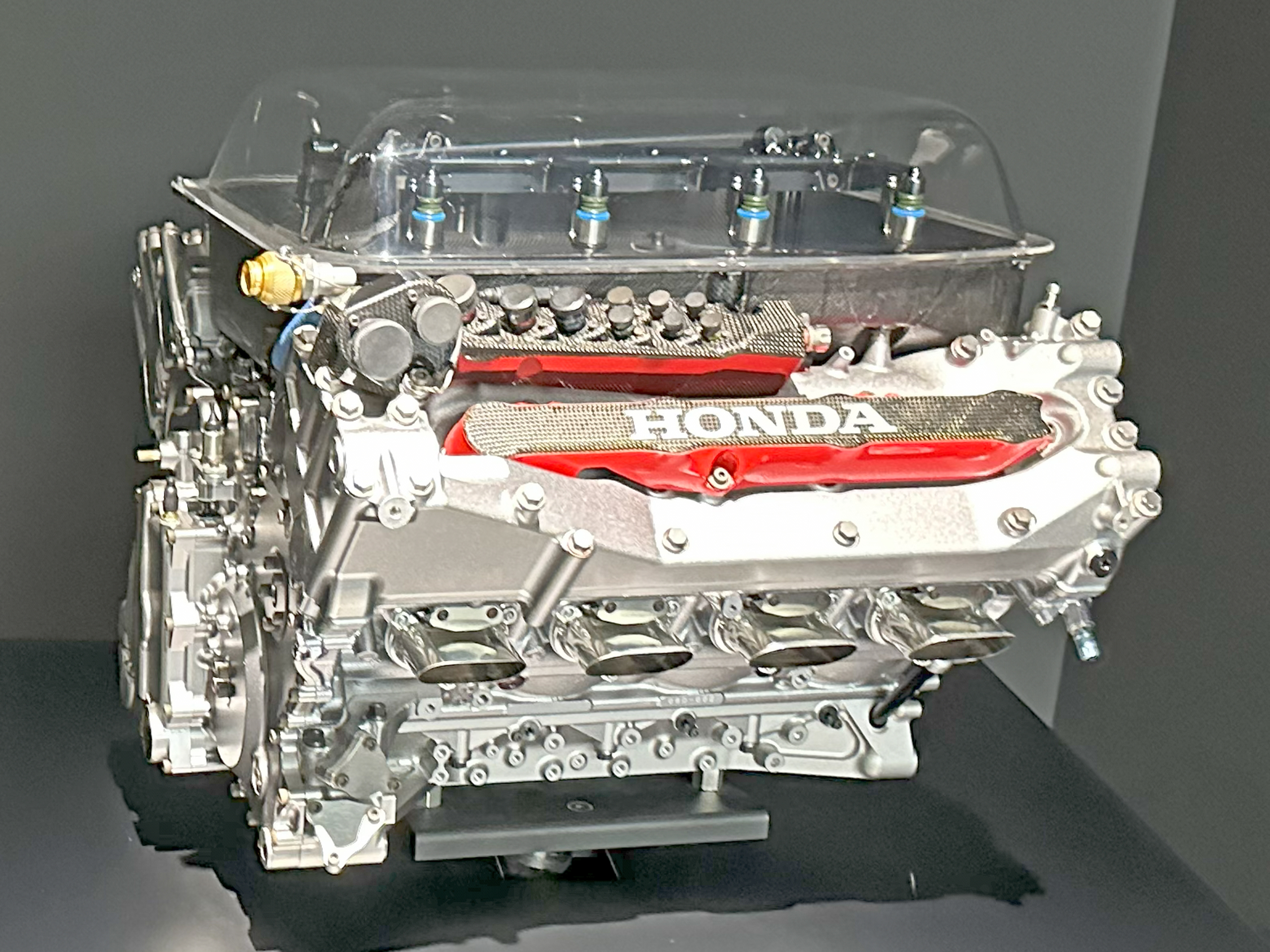

Overview
- Manufacturer: (Japan) Honda
- Production: 1968, 2006–2008

Layout
- Configuration: 120°-90° V-8
- Displacement: 3.0 L (2,987 cc); 2.4 L (2,395 cc)
- Cylinder bore: 88 mm (3.5 in); 97 mm (3.8 in)
- Piston stroke: 61.4 mm (2.4 in); 40.52 mm (1.6 in)

Combustion
- Fuel system: Timed fuel injection (1968); Electronic indirect fuel injection (2006-2008)
- Fuel type: BP/Shell (1968); ENEOS (2006-2008) gasoline
- Oil system: dry sump
- Cooling system: Air-cooled (1968); Water-cooled (2006-2008)

Output
- Power output: 430–775 hp (321–578 kW; 436–786 PS)
- Torque output: 220–301 lb⋅ft (298–408 N⋅m)

Dimensions
- Dry weight: 95 kg (209.4 lb)

Chronology
- Predecessor: Honda V10 engine Honda V12 engine (1968)
- Successor: Honda V6 hybrid Formula One power unit

Honda has made two variations of a four-stroke, naturally-aspirated, V8 racing engines to compete in Formula One. First, a 3-litre engine in 1968; which had its only competitive outing at the infamous, and ultimately tragic 1968 French Grand Prix, in which driver Jo Schlesser was killed. Second, the 2.4-litre RA8 series engine, which was introduced in 2006, to comply with the new Formula One regulations. Honda ultimately had to pull out of Formula One after 2008, due to the 2008 financial crisis. The customer engines were used by both Honda and Super Aguri teams.

== Complete Formula One results ==
=== As a constructor ===
(key)

Year	Entrant	Chassis	Engine	Tyres	Drivers	1	2	3	4	5	6	7	8	9	10	11	12	13	14	15	16	17	18	Points	WCC
1968	Honda R & D Company	RA302	RA302E; 3.0 V8	F																					
1968	Honda R & D Company	RA302	RA302E; 3.0 V8	F		RSA	ESP	MON	BEL	NED	FRA	GBR	GER	ITA	CAN	USA	MEX							14	6th
1968	Honda R & D Company	RA302	RA302E; 3.0 V8	F	(France) Jo Schlesser						Ret													14	6th
1969 – 2005: Honda did not compete as a constructor.
2006	Lucky Strike Honda Racing F1 Team	RA106	RA806E; 2.4 V8	MI		BHR	MAL	AUS	SMR	EUR	ESP	MON	GBR	CAN	USA	FRA	GER	HUN	TUR	ITA	CHN	JPN	BRA	86	4th
2006	Lucky Strike Honda Racing F1 Team	RA106	RA806E; 2.4 V8	MI	(Brazil) Rubens Barrichello	15	10	7	10	5	7	4	10	Ret	6	Ret	Ret	4	8	6	6	12	7	86	4th
2006	Lucky Strike Honda Racing F1 Team	RA106	RA806E; 2.4 V8	MI	(United Kingdom) Jenson Button	4	3	10^{P}^{†}	7	Ret	6	11	Ret	9	Ret	Ret	4	1	4	5	4	4	3	86	4th
2007	Honda Racing F1 Team	RA107	RA807E; 2.4 V8	B		AUS	MAL	BHR	ESP	MON	CAN	USA	FRA	GBR	EUR	HUN	TUR	ITA	BEL	JPN	CHN	BRA		6	8th
2007	Honda Racing F1 Team	RA107	RA807E; 2.4 V8	B	(United Kingdom) Jenson Button	15	12	Ret	12	11	Ret	12	8	10	Ret	Ret	13	8	Ret	11^{†}	5	Ret		6	8th
2007	Honda Racing F1 Team	RA107	RA807E; 2.4 V8	B	(Brazil) Rubens Barrichello	11	11	13	10	10	12	Ret	11	9	11	18	17	10	13	10	15	Ret		6	8th
2008	Honda Racing F1 Team	RA108	RA808E; 2.4 V8	B		AUS	MAL	BHR	ESP	TUR	MON	CAN	FRA	GBR	GER	HUN	EUR	BEL	ITA	SIN	JPN	CHN	BRA	14	9th
2008	Honda Racing F1 Team	RA108	RA808E; 2.4 V8	B	(United Kingdom) Jenson Button	Ret	10	Ret	6	11	11	11	Ret	Ret	17	12	13	15	15	9	14	16	13	14	9th
2008	Honda Racing F1 Team	RA108	RA808E; 2.4 V8	B	(Brazil) Rubens Barrichello	DSQ	13	11	Ret	14	6	7	14	3	Ret	16	16	Ret	17	Ret	13	11	15	14	9th

- All 14 points scored by Honda V12 engines.

=== As an engine supplier ===
(key)

Year	Entrant	Chassis	Engine	Tyres	Drivers	1	2	3	4	5	6	7	8	9	10	11	12	13	14	15	16	17	18	Points	WCC
2006	Super Aguri F1 Team	SA05; SA06	RA806E; 2.4 V8	B		BHR	MAL	AUS	SMR	EUR	ESP	MON	GBR	CAN	USA	FRA	GER	HUN	TUR	ITA	CHN	JPN	BRA	0	11th
2006	Super Aguri F1 Team	SA05; SA06	RA806E; 2.4 V8	B	(Japan) Takuma Sato	18	14	12	Ret	Ret	17	Ret	17	15^{†}	Ret	Ret	Ret	13	NC	16	DSQ	15	10	0	11th
2006	Super Aguri F1 Team	SA05; SA06	RA806E; 2.4 V8	B	(Japan) Yuji Ide	Ret	Ret	13	Ret															0	11th
2006	Super Aguri F1 Team	SA05; SA06	RA806E; 2.4 V8	B	(France) Franck Montagny					Ret	Ret	16	18	Ret	Ret	16								0	11th
2006	Super Aguri F1 Team	SA05; SA06	RA806E; 2.4 V8	B	(Japan) Sakon Yamamoto												Ret	Ret	Ret	Ret	16	17	16	0	11th
2007	Super Aguri F1 Team	SA07	RA807E; 2.4 V8	B		AUS	MAL	BHR	ESP	MON	CAN	USA	FRA	GBR	EUR	HUN	TUR	ITA	BEL	JPN	CHN	BRA		4	9th
2007	Super Aguri F1 Team	SA07	RA807E; 2.4 V8	B	(Japan) Takuma Sato	12	13	Ret	8	17	6	Ret	16	14	Ret	15	18	16	15	15^{†}	14	12		4	9th
2007	Super Aguri F1 Team	SA07	RA807E; 2.4 V8	B	(United Kingdom) Anthony Davidson	16	16	16^{†}	11	18	11	11	Ret	Ret	12	Ret	14	14	16	Ret	Ret	14		4	9th
2008	Super Aguri F1 Team	SA08	RA808E; 2.4 V8	B		AUS	MAL	BHR	ESP	TUR	MON	CAN	FRA	GBR	GER	HUN	EUR	BEL	ITA	SIN	JPN	CHN	BRA	0	11th
2008	Super Aguri F1 Team	SA08	RA808E; 2.4 V8	B	(Japan) Takuma Sato	Ret	16	17	13															0	11th
2008	Super Aguri F1 Team	SA08	RA808E; 2.4 V8	B	(United Kingdom) Anthony Davidson	Ret	15	16	Ret															0	11th

== Grand Prix engine results ==
- 1 race win.
- 1 pole position.
- 4 podium finishes
