= 2006 Formula One World Championship =

Formula One motor racing championship

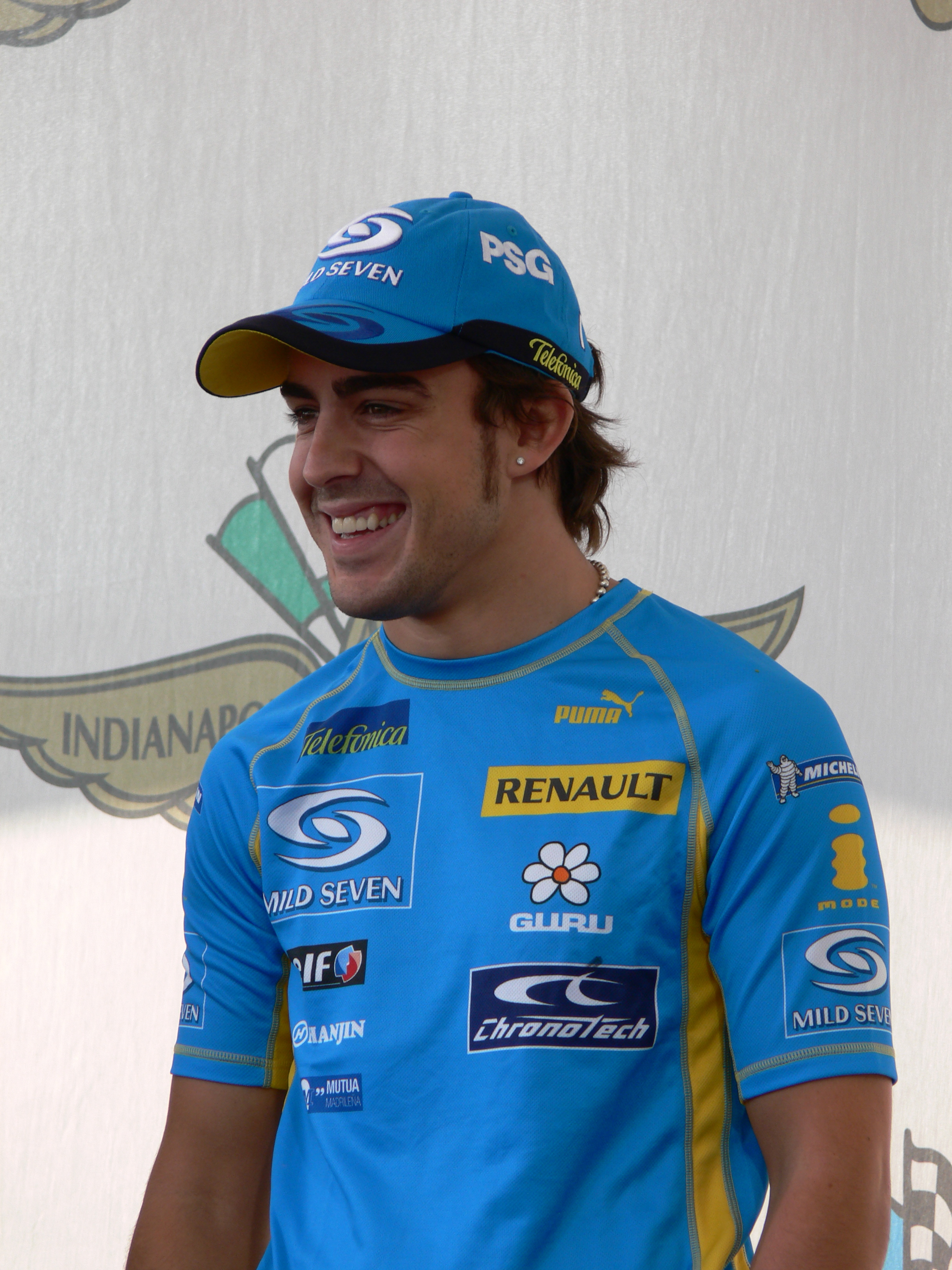
Fernando Alonso successfully defended his Formula One Drivers' Championship, scoring 134 points with Renault for his second consecutive title.

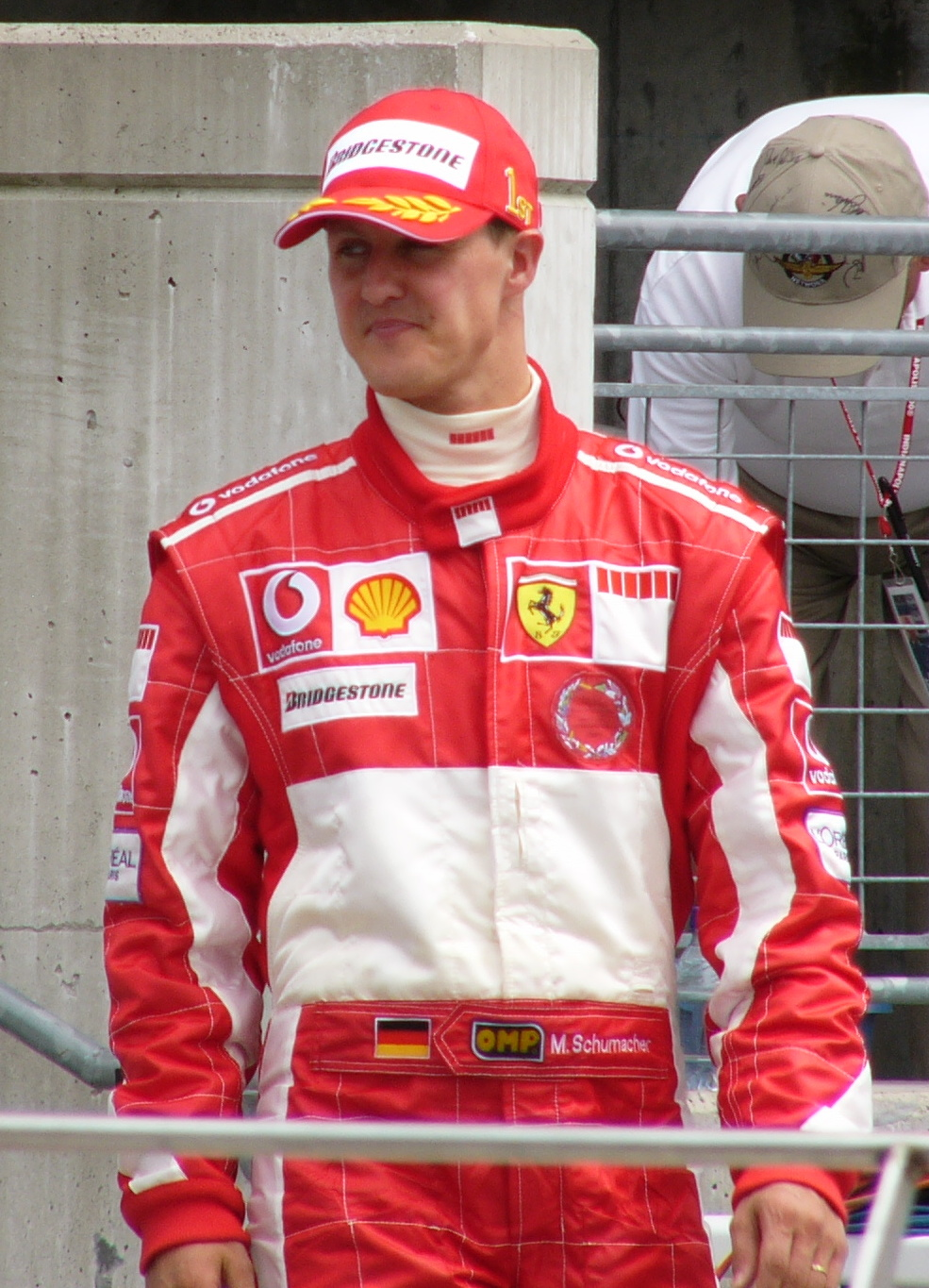
Seven-time champion Michael Schumacher finished the season second with Ferrari with 121 points in his last season with the team.

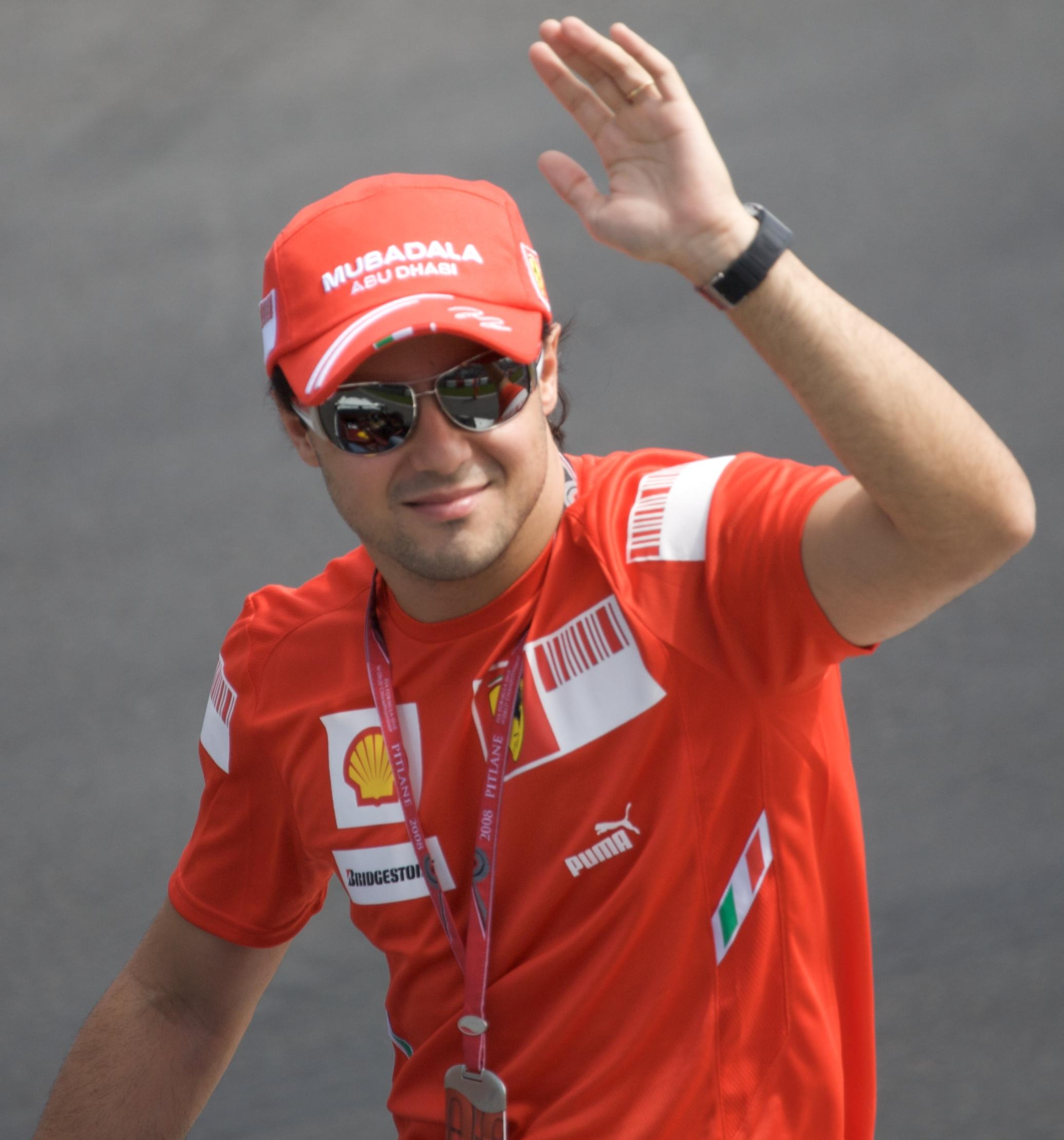
Schumacher's teammate Felipe Massa (pictured in 2008), in his first year with Ferrari, finished third in the standings.

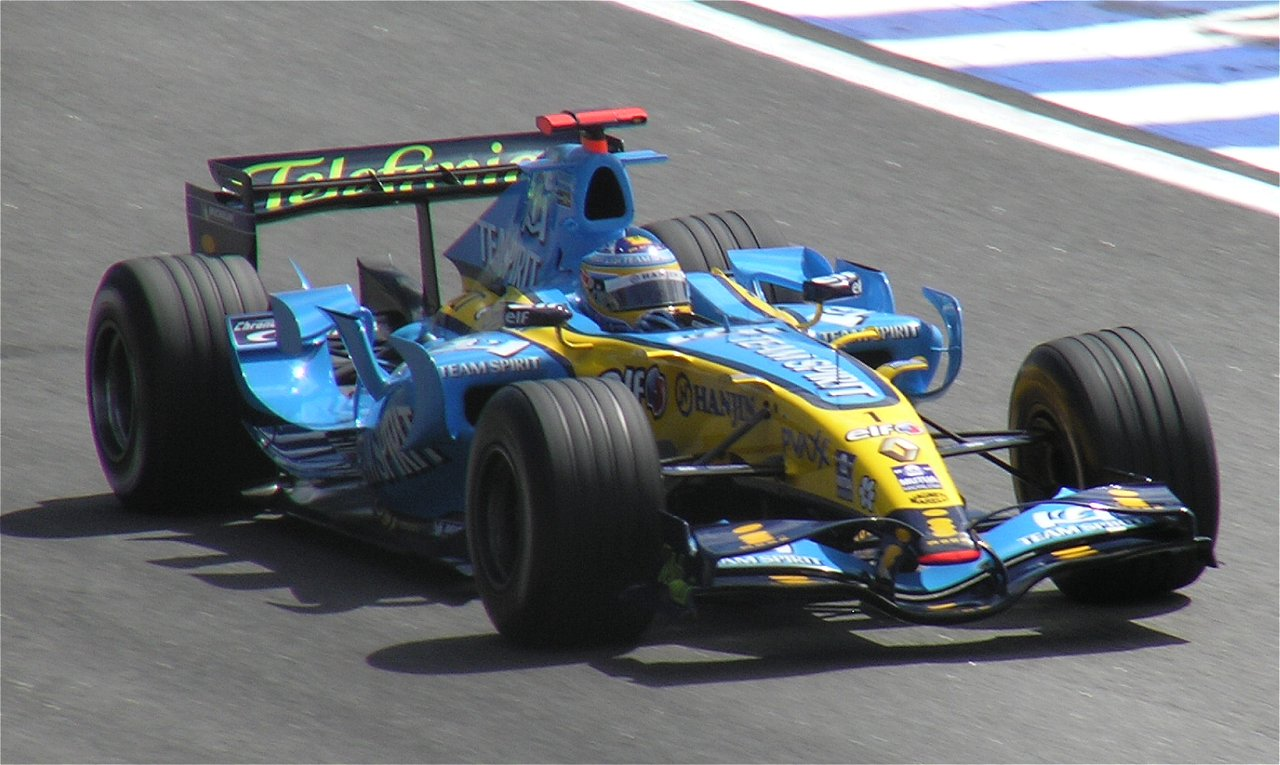
Renault won the World Constructors' Championship with the Renault R26.

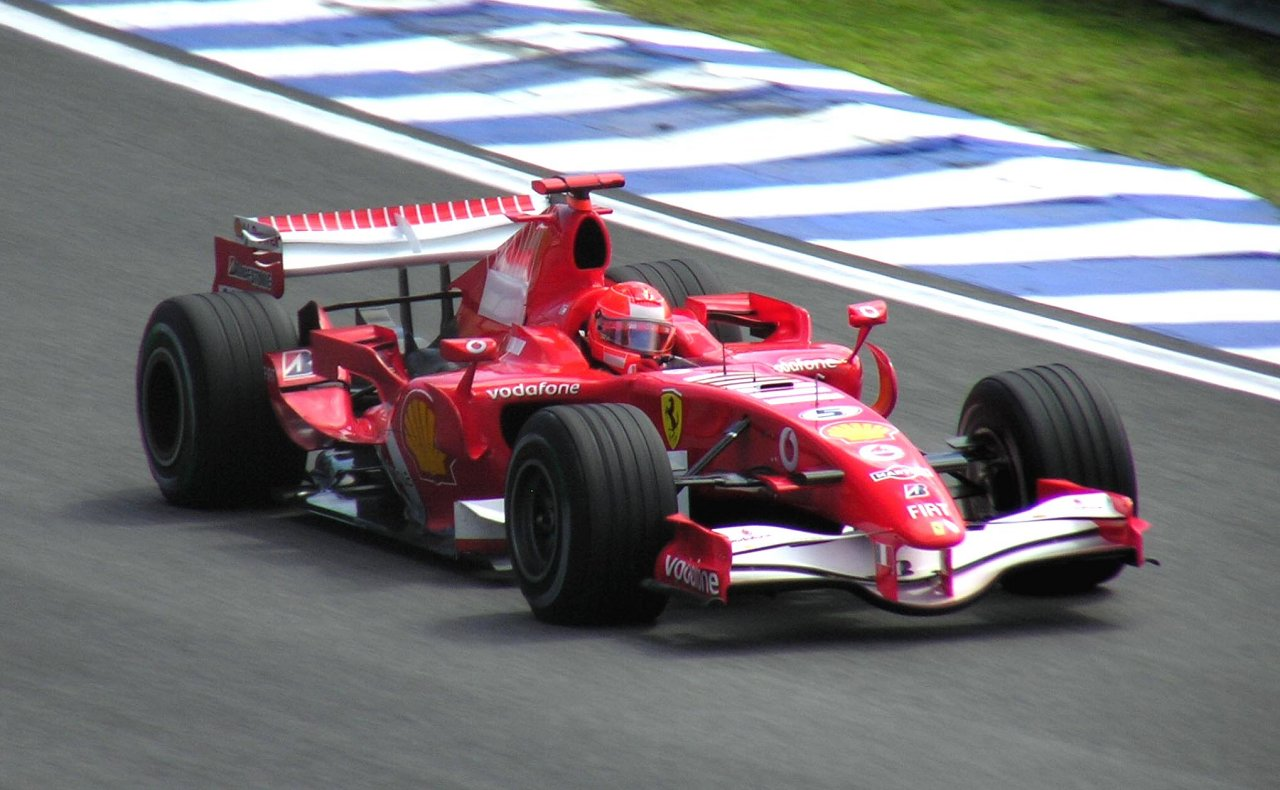
Ferrari finished runner-up in the World Constructors' Championship with the Ferrari 248 F1.

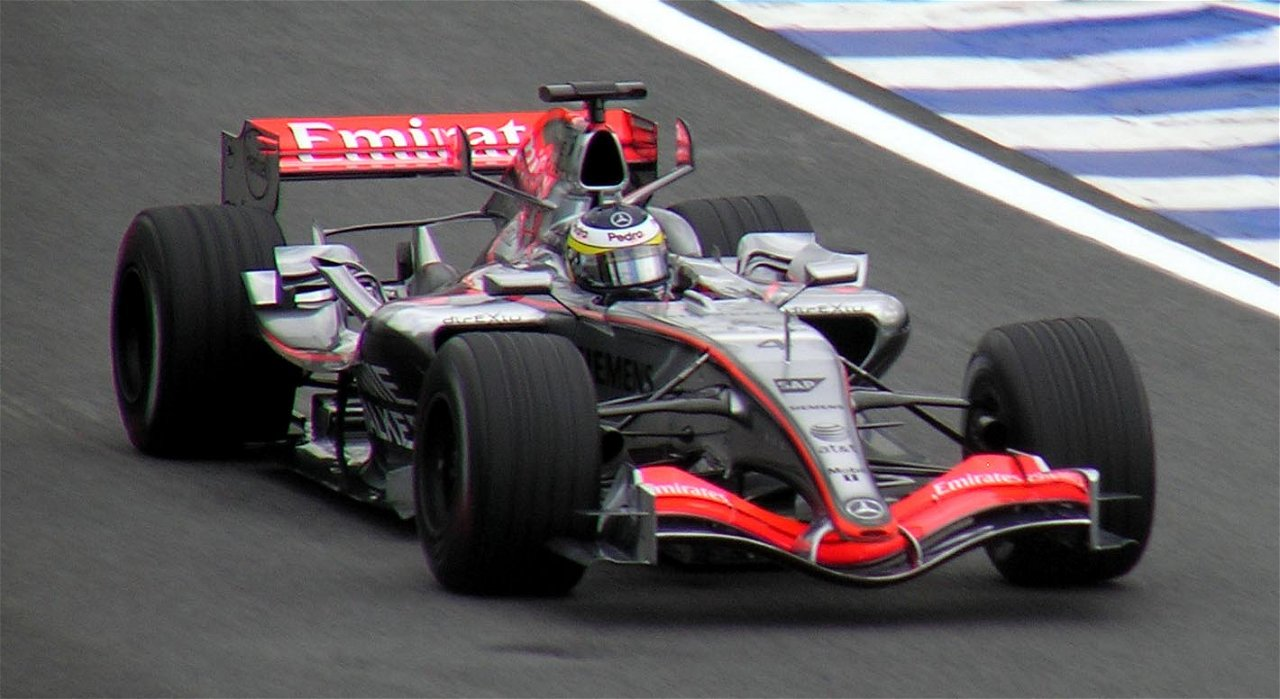
McLaren finished third in the World Constructors' Championship with the McLaren MP4-21.

The 2006 FIA Formula One World Championship was the 60th season of Formula One motor racing. It featured the 57th Formula One World Championship which began on 12 March and ended on 22 October after eighteen races. The Drivers' Championship was won by Fernando Alonso of Renault for the second year in a row, with Alonso becoming the youngest ever double world champion at the time. Then-retiring seven-time world champion Michael Schumacher of Scuderia Ferrari finished runner-up, 13 points behind. The Constructors' Championship was won by Renault, which defeated Ferrari by five points.

The season was highlighted by the rivalry between Alonso and Schumacher, who each won seven races. Renault and Ferrari drivers dominated the field, victorious in all but one race: the Hungarian Grand Prix was won by Honda's Jenson Button, and the four second-place finishes not achieved by Renault or Ferrari were accomplished by McLaren. This season also marked the beginning of the usage of 2.4L V8 engines in Formula One from the 3.0L V10 engines that were used in the previous seasons, which continued until the end of the 2013 season. 2006 was also the first season since 1988 and 1997 respectively to feature multiple engine displacements and configurations, as Scuderia Toro Rosso were given special dispensation to continue using V10s.

For the first time since the 1956 season, no British constructor won any race. Additionally, 2006 was the first season since 1957 that all races were won by constructors that built both the chassis and engine for their cars.

The season saw several changes occurring in the drivers' market starting already in December 2005 as Alonso sealed a move to McLaren for 2007. In September 2006, Schumacher announced his retirement from Formula One at the end of the season, with 2003 and 2005 championship runner-up Kimi Räikkönen being announced as his replacement at Ferrari. Among other notable departures included Juan Pablo Montoya, who left McLaren mid-season to pursue a career in NASCAR and 1997 World Champion Jacques Villeneuve who left after the German Grand Prix. The season saw the debut of the future world champion, Nico Rosberg.

As of 2026, this is the last Constructors' Championship for Renault, and the last Drivers' Championship for a Spanish Formula One driver. The 2006 championship also saw the last season of the Bridgestone-Michelin tyre war which had started in 2001 as Michelin withdrew from the sport at the end of this season leaving Bridgestone as the sole tyre supplier for 2007, a position the Japanese company would retain until leaving the sport themselves at the end of 2010 and replaced by Pirelli from 2011 onwards. As of 2026, this is the last Formula One season to have 2 tyre suppliers, and is also the last season overall to feature more than one tyre supplier.

== Teams and drivers ==
The following teams and drivers competed in the 2006 FIA Formula One World Championship.

Entrant	Constructor	Chassis	Engine	Tyre	No.	Race drivers	Rounds
(France) Mild Seven Renault F1 Team	Renault	R26	Renault RS26 2.4 V8	M	1	(Spain) Fernando Alonso	All
(France) Mild Seven Renault F1 Team	Renault	R26	Renault RS26 2.4 V8	M	2	(Italy) Giancarlo Fisichella	All
(United Kingdom) Team McLaren Mercedes	McLaren-Mercedes	MP4-21	Mercedes FO 108S 2.4 V8	M	3	(Finland) Kimi Räikkönen	All
(United Kingdom) Team McLaren Mercedes	McLaren-Mercedes	MP4-21	Mercedes FO 108S 2.4 V8	M	4	(Colombia) Juan Pablo Montoya	1–10
(United Kingdom) Team McLaren Mercedes	McLaren-Mercedes	MP4-21	Mercedes FO 108S 2.4 V8	M	4	(Spain) Pedro de la Rosa	11–18
(Italy) Scuderia Ferrari Marlboro	Ferrari	248 F1	Ferrari 056 2.4 V8	B	5	(Germany) Michael Schumacher	All
(Italy) Scuderia Ferrari Marlboro	Ferrari	248 F1	Ferrari 056 2.4 V8	B	6	(Brazil) Felipe Massa	All
(Japan) Panasonic Toyota Racing	Toyota	TF106; TF106B	Toyota RVX-06 2.4 V8	B	7	(Germany) Ralf Schumacher	All
(Japan) Panasonic Toyota Racing	Toyota	TF106; TF106B	Toyota RVX-06 2.4 V8	B	8	(Italy) Jarno Trulli	All
(United Kingdom) Williams F1 Team	Williams-Cosworth	FW28	Cosworth CA2006 2.4 V8	B	9	(Australia) Mark Webber	All
(United Kingdom) Williams F1 Team	Williams-Cosworth	FW28	Cosworth CA2006 2.4 V8	B	10	(Germany) Nico Rosberg	All
(Japan) Lucky Strike Honda Racing F1 Team	Honda	RA106	Honda RA806E 2.4 V8	M	11	(Brazil) Rubens Barrichello	All
(Japan) Lucky Strike Honda Racing F1 Team	Honda	RA106	Honda RA806E 2.4 V8	M	12	(United Kingdom) Jenson Button	All
(United Kingdom) Red Bull Racing (Note: Red Bull competed under a British licence.)	Red Bull-Ferrari	RB2	Ferrari 056 2.4 V8	M	14	(United Kingdom) David Coulthard	All
(United Kingdom) Red Bull Racing	Red Bull-Ferrari	RB2	Ferrari 056 2.4 V8	M	15	(Austria) Christian Klien	1–15
(United Kingdom) Red Bull Racing	Red Bull-Ferrari	RB2	Ferrari 056 2.4 V8	M	15	(Netherlands) Robert Doornbos	16–18
(Germany) BMW Sauber F1 Team	BMW Sauber	F1.06	BMW P86 2.4 V8	M	16	(Germany) Nick Heidfeld	All
(Germany) BMW Sauber F1 Team	BMW Sauber	F1.06	BMW P86 2.4 V8	M	17	(Canada) Jacques Villeneuve	1–12
(Germany) BMW Sauber F1 Team	BMW Sauber	F1.06	BMW P86 2.4 V8	M	17	(Poland) Robert Kubica	13–18
(Russia) MF1 Racing (Note: Midland entered last three Grands Prix as "Spyker MF1 Racing".)	MF1-Toyota	M16	Toyota RVX-06 2.4 V8	B	18	(Portugal) Tiago Monteiro	All
(Russia) MF1 Racing	MF1-Toyota	M16	Toyota RVX-06 2.4 V8	B	19	(Netherlands) Christijan Albers	All
(Italy) Scuderia Toro Rosso	Toro Rosso-Cosworth	STR1	Cosworth TJ2005 3.0 V10	M	20	(Italy) Vitantonio Liuzzi	All
(Italy) Scuderia Toro Rosso	Toro Rosso-Cosworth	STR1	Cosworth TJ2005 3.0 V10	M	21	(United States) Scott Speed	All
(Japan) Super Aguri F1 Team	Super Aguri-Honda	SA05; SA06	Honda RA806E 2.4 V8	B	22	(Japan) Takuma Sato	All
(Japan) Super Aguri F1 Team	Super Aguri-Honda	SA05; SA06	Honda RA806E 2.4 V8	B	23	(Japan) Yuji Ide	1–4
(Japan) Super Aguri F1 Team	Super Aguri-Honda	SA05; SA06	Honda RA806E 2.4 V8	B	23	(France) Franck Montagny	5–11
(Japan) Super Aguri F1 Team	Super Aguri-Honda	SA05; SA06	Honda RA806E 2.4 V8	B	23	(Japan) Sakon Yamamoto	12–18

=== Free practice drivers ===
Seven constructors entered free practice only drivers over the course of the season.

Drivers that took part in free practice sessions
Constructor	Practice drivers		
Constructor	No.	Driver name	Rounds
Williams-Cosworth	35	(Austria) Alexander Wurz	All
Honda	36	(United Kingdom) Anthony Davidson	All
Red Bull-Ferrari	37	(Netherlands) Robert Doornbos (Germany) Michael Ammermüller	1–15; 16–18
BMW Sauber	38	(Poland) Robert Kubica (Germany) Sebastian Vettel	1–12; 14–18
MF1-Toyota	39	(Germany) Markus Winkelhock (Switzerland) Giorgio Mondini (Germany) Adrian Sutil (France) Alexandre Prémat (Venezuela) Ernesto Viso	1, 3, 12–13; 2, 4, 6–10, 14–15; 5, 11, 17; 16; 18
Toro Rosso-Cosworth	40	(Switzerland) Neel Jani	All
Super Aguri-Honda	41	(Japan) Sakon Yamamoto (France) Franck Montagny	8–11; 14–18

=== Manufacturer and team changes ===
- Three prominent names in the sport disappeared for this season, with Minardi, BAR and Jordan changing names under new ownership, while Sauber changed ownership, and one new team, Super Aguri, entered at the last moment. Minardi were taken over by Red Bull, becoming Toro Rosso, which is Italian for Red Bull. The Sauber name remained, although largely as a sentiment, as BMW had purchased 80% of the team, with Peter Sauber keeping only a 20% share. A year after Alex Shnaider had purchased the team and following a disappointing final season under the Jordan name, Jordan was renamed to MF1 Racing after Shnaider's Midland Group company. Late in the season, the team was bought by Spyker. Honda, who already owned a 45% stake in the BAR team, completed their takeover of the team and changed its name to Honda Racing F1 Team at the start of the season. Super Aguri F1 also entered their first season after having problems entering. They received limited backing from Honda including technology and engines, due to them running Honda factory driver Takuma Sato despite Super Aguri being a Honda customer team. As a result of Honda's expansion of supplying engines to Super Aguri, this marked the first season since 2002 that Honda supplied multiple teams in the sport when Honda supplied both BAR and Jordan respectively.
- Williams introduced numerous changes for 2006, particularly changing to Cosworth V8 engines after they and BMW split. Red Bull Racing (RBR) had Ferrari engines, replacing the Cosworth power which gained them seventh in the standings in 2005. Williams and Toyota changed tyre suppliers to Bridgestone, due to Michelin's desire to supply fewer teams in the championship. Despite this, Toro Rosso, who under the Minardi name ran Bridgestone tyres, switched to Michelin in line with parent team RBR.
- After Ilmor fully sold its UK engine division to DaimlerChrysler, Ilmor-Mercedes officially renamed to Mercedes-Benz High Performance Engines and thus effectively Mercedes-Benz became a sole in-house sport engine builder, assembler and tuner from 2006 onwards.

=== Driver changes ===
- Ferrari replaced Michael Schumacher's longtime teammate Rubens Barrichello with fellow Brazilian Felipe Massa, who moved from Sauber. Massa had previously tested with Ferrari in 2003. Massa was replaced at the newly renamed BMW Sauber team by returnee Nick Heidfeld, who had driven for BMW's previous partners Williams for much of 2005 and Sauber in 2001-2003. Poland's Robert Kubica took up the third driver's role at BMW Sauber.
- Barrichello moved to Honda, where he replaced the outgoing Takuma Sato. The Honda-backed Super Aguri team started the season with Sato and Yuji Ide, an all-Japanese driver line up. Franck Montagny moved from his Renault testing role to become Super Aguri's third driver. His position at Renault was taken by the GP2 runner-up Heikki Kovalainen.
- Williams promoted test driver Nico Rosberg, who had won the inaugural GP2 drivers' title, to their second seat alongside Mark Webber. Alexander Wurz, one of McLaren's test drivers from 2005, joined Williams as a third driver, alongside India's Narain Karthikeyan, who had raced for Jordan the previous season. Gary Paffett was promoted to a permanent testing role at McLaren alongside Pedro de la Rosa.
- Karthikeyan's seat at Jordan, now renamed as MF1, was taken by the 2005 Minardi driver Christijan Albers. MF1 decided to employ a rotation system for their third driver position. Minardi's other driver, Robert Doornbos, took up a test driving role at Red Bull. Vitantonio Liuzzi, who had shared Red Bull's second seat with Christian Klien in 2005, moved to Red Bull's newly acquired sister team Toro Rosso—previously Minardi—where he partnered his fellow Red Bull-backed driver Scott Speed. The Swiss driver Neel Jani became Toro Rosso's third driver.

==== Mid-season changes ====
- After the San Marino Grand Prix Super Aguri's Yuji Ide had his superlicence revoked by the FIA and could no longer race in Formula One. He was replaced by the team's reserve driver Franck Montagny for the next race. Super Aguri hired Sakon Yamamoto, one of Jordan's test drivers from 2005, to be their third driver from the British Grand Prix onwards, in place of the promoted Montagny. Yamamoto and Montagny switched places from the German Grand Prix onwards.
- After the United States Grand Prix, Juan Pablo Montoya announced he was moving to NASCAR for the 2007 season and leaving McLaren. The next day, McLaren announced that Montoya would be replaced in their driver line up by test driver Pedro de la Rosa, ending Montoya's five and a half-year F1 career since 2001.
- Robert Kubica was promoted to a race seat by BMW Sauber at the Hungarian Grand Prix, replacing 1997 World Champion Jacques Villeneuve, possibly due to Villeneuve's injuries after a heavy crash in the German Grand Prix. On the day after the Hungarian GP (7 August 2006), BMW Sauber announced that Villeneuve had left the team with immediate effect, with Kubica replacing him permanently for the remainder of the season. German Formula 3 driver Sebastian Vettel became BMW Sauber's third driver from the Turkish Grand Prix onwards, replacing the promoted Kubica.
- On 10 September 2006, Ferrari's seven-time world champion Michael Schumacher announced his retirement at the end of the season (he returned to Mercedes in 2010). Following this, Ferrari brought in Kimi Räikkönen as their team driver for the 2007 season.
- On 11 September 2006, Red Bull Racing announced that the team officially sacked Christian Klien and thus Red Bull drafted its third/test driver, Robert Doornbos for the final three races of the season as a result of Klien's string of poor results. For the races in China and Japan, Michael Ammermüller replaced Doornbos as third driver.
- Spyker MF1 announced a duo of new third drivers for two of the final races of the year. GP2 Series drivers Alexandre Prémat and Ernesto Viso took part in practice in China and Brazil respectively; Adrian Sutil, who had previously tested in Germany and France, again tested for the team in Japan.
- During the test at the Silverstone Circuit in September, GP2 Series drivers Lewis Hamilton, Nelson Piquet Jr., and Adrián Vallés performed test duties for McLaren, Renault and MF1, respectively. Super Aguri's former race driver Franck Montagny also tested for Toyota.

== Calendar ==
The Australian Grand Prix was held later than usual, to avoid a clash with the 2006 Commonwealth Games. For the first time, Bahrain hosted the first Grand Prix. Brazil hosted the last race, while Japan and China swapped their original dates.

In 2006, the FIA announced the Belgian Grand Prix would not be part of the 2006 Formula One season, since the local authorities had started major repair work in Spa-Francorchamps. The Belgian Grand Prix returned in 2007.

Round	Grand Prix	Circuit	Date
1	Bahrain Grand Prix	Bahrain International Circuit, Sakhir	12 March
2	Malaysian Grand Prix	(Malaysia) Sepang International Circuit, Kuala Lumpur	19 March
3	Australian Grand Prix	(Australia) Albert Park Circuit, Melbourne	2 April
4	San Marino Grand Prix	(Italy) Autodromo Enzo e Dino Ferrari, Imola	23 April
5	European Grand Prix	(Germany) Nürburgring, Nürburg	7 May
6	Spanish Grand Prix	(Spain) Circuit de Catalunya, Montmeló	14 May
7	Monaco Grand Prix	Circuit de Monaco, Monte-Carlo	28 May
8	British Grand Prix	(United Kingdom) Silverstone Circuit, Silverstone	11 June
9	Canadian Grand Prix	(Canada) Circuit Gilles Villeneuve, Montreal	25 June
10	United States Grand Prix	(United States) Indianapolis Motor Speedway, Speedway	2 July
11	French Grand Prix	(France) Circuit de Nevers Magny-Cours, Magny-Cours	16 July
12	German Grand Prix	(Germany) Hockenheimring, Hockenheim	30 July
13	Hungarian Grand Prix	(Hungary) Hungaroring, Mogyoród	6 August
14	Turkish Grand Prix	(Turkey) Istanbul Park, Istanbul	27 August
15	Italian Grand Prix	(Italy) Autodromo Nazionale di Monza, Monza	10 September
16	Chinese Grand Prix	(China) Shanghai International Circuit, Shanghai	1 October
17	Japanese Grand Prix	(Japan) Suzuka Circuit, Suzuka	8 October
18	Brazilian Grand Prix	(Brazil) Autódromo José Carlos Pace, São Paulo	22 October

== Regulation changes ==
=== Technical regulations ===
- In an attempt to curb the increasing engine power levels of recent years, the maximum engine displacement was reduced from 3.0 to 2.4 litres and the number of cylinders from 10 to 8. At similar engine speeds, the change was expected to cut peak power by around 200 bhp, which would equate to around three to five seconds on lap times at most circuits. (Scuderia Toro Rosso continued to use 3.0-litre 10-cylinder engines with both rev and air-intake limiters to avoid the costs of re-engineering their cars in a short period). Initial testing indicated the new engines were six seconds slower than their V10 counterparts, but early in the season, it became obvious that despite the decrease in power, lap times were not far from 2005 figures; on some circuits, the fastest laps set this year were actually faster than the ones recorded the previous year, with the V10 engines.
- Some engine suppliers indicated early that their smaller V8s can rev higher than the 19,000 rpms normal for 2005-spec V10s. Northampton-based engine builder Cosworth had an enviable record of success with V8 engines. It made further history by becoming the first manufacturer to have broken the 20,000 rpm limit on track in December 2005.
- Tyre changes returned to Formula One in 2006. Each driver is limited to 14 sets of tyres per race weekend. This consists of seven sets of dry-weather tyres, four sets of wet-weather tyres and three sets of extreme-weather tyres. The thinking behind this is that the reduced engine size will offset any performance gain. The number of constructors who were supplied tyres by Michelin was down from seven to six while Bridgestone increased from three to five - Toyota and Williams both switched to Bridgestone, and newcomers Super Aguri also ran on Bridgestone, whilst Scuderia Toro Rosso switched to Michelin having run on Bridgestone in their former guise as Minardi. Michelin announced they would withdraw from the championship after the 2006 season.
- All Formula One cars and entrants began to utilise mandatory 7-speed + 1 reverse semi-automatic gearbox configuration from 2006 to 2013.
- To keep costs down, the fuel tank capacity of all Formula One cars were mandatorily standardized to 150 litres (40 US gallons).

=== Sporting regulations ===
- A new qualifying system consisting of three sessions of varying length was introduced. A 15-minute session was held first, in which the six slowest cars from that session were eliminated and thus set in grid positions 17–22. After a five-minute break, another 15-minute session was held with the remaining cars, and again the six slowest cars were eliminated and set in positions 11–16. These twelve eliminated drivers were placed in parc fermé, but allowed to modify fuel loads as they see fit.
- During a further five-minute break, the remaining 10 cars declared their fuel loads to the FIA. A final 20 minute session then decided the top 10 grid positions. Teams were allowed to run their fuel load low by making as many laps as possible, and thus improve their times as the weight falls. This was considered an improvement for TV audiences because teams needed to run as many laps as possible to lower their fuel loads. Following this session, the top ten cars were placed in parc ferme and required to refill their fuel load to the level of that at the beginning of the final 20 minutes. Starting with the 2006 French Grand Prix, qualifying for final session was cut short to just 15 minutes, making all of the sessions the same length, and the ability for drivers to complete a flying lap after the chequered flag drop now applied in the first two sessions as well.
- A loophole was detected by the FIA, in that teams could declare a large fuel load but on the out lap "leak", or use a large quantity of fuel to lighten a car and permit a faster lap. The FIA decided to only count laps that are within 110% of the driver's fastest time, and allow teams to top up with the amount of fuel used for those laps.
- Only one free practice session was held on Saturdays, for one hour, and it ended no less than two hours before qualifying begins, usually between 11.00 and 12.00, replacing the old system of two 45-minute sessions. Friday remained unchanged, with two one-hour sessions, starting three hours apart.
- The tuned mass damper system was used by several teams, notably Renault, during the latter part of 2005 and the 2006 seasons. The devices were located in the nosecone, and were particularly effective in corners and over kerbs to keep the tyres in closer contact to the track surface than they would otherwise be. After the French Grand Prix, the FIA announced that the system would be outlawed. This had a particularly significant effect on Renault, as the team had effectively built their cars around the devices, and had introduced them as long ago as the 2005 Brazilian Grand Prix. At the German Grand Prix the Renault team submitted one of their cars for scrutineering by the race stewards, who ruled that the devices were acceptable. The FIA launched an appeal against this decision, and on 23 August 2006 the FIA International Court of Appeal issued a statement upholding this appeal and rejecting the stewards' decision. The Court of Appeal stated that the system infringed part of the bodywork section (Article 3.15) of the Formula One Technical Regulations, which stated that any specific part of the car influencing its aerodynamic performance had to: comply with the rules relating to bodywork, be rigidly secured to the entirely sprung part of the car (rigidly secured means not having any degree of freedom), and remain immobile in relation to the sprung part of the car. The central argument was whether the mass dampers function as aerodynamic devices or as a part of the suspension system. The FIA reasoned that because the devices did not "remain immobile in relation to the sprung part of the car", they were illegal. But the FIA failed to explain how the damper, which was entirely enclosed with the car can be counted as bodywork when article 1.4 of the regulations defined bodywork as:

All entirely sprung parts of the car in contact with the external air stream, except cameras and the parts definitely associated with the mechanical functioning of the engine, transmission and running gear. Airboxes, radiators and engine exhausts are considered to be part of the bodywork.

Following the ruling by the Court of Appeal, the system was officially banned before the 2006 Turkish Grand Prix. In a later interview, Renault's Flavio Briatore named McLaren as the team who complained to the FIA.

== Background ==
The calendar was initially announced as the same as for 2005, with the Belgian Grand Prix scheduled for 17 September. However, on 8 February, the FIA announced that the Belgian National Sporting Authority (RACB) were withdrawing Spa-Francorchamps from the 2006 Formula One calendar due to a lack of time to complete improvements to the track. The race has traditionally received strong support from drivers and FIA President Max Mosley and the Grand Prix was back on the Grand Prix calendar for the 2007 season.

2006 was the last season with two tyre manufacturers: The two manufacturers at the time were Japanese manufacturer Bridgestone and French company Michelin. In December 2005, the FIA announced that from the 2008 season, there would be only one tyre supplier. Five days later, Michelin announced it would quit Formula One at the end of the 2006 season as it did not want to be in Formula One as the sole tyre supplier.

At the end of 2005, three well-known teams were bought out: Minardi, Sauber and Jordan. The former were bought by Red Bull to be run as a junior team to house their growing list of young talent looking for an F1 drive. Despite campaigns by Minardi fans the team were renamed Scuderia Toro Rosso (Toro Rosso), Italian for Team Red Bull. The Sauber team was purchased by BMW. BMW opted to keep the Sauber name in F1 renaming the team BMW Sauber. Jordan, who had been bought by the Midland Group in 2004, changed their name to MF1 Racing after a transition year in 2005.

2006 also saw the introduction of a new Japanese team, Super Aguri F1, founded by former F1 driver Aguri Suzuki, who entered at the last moment. Super Aguri notified the FIA on 1 November 2005 (ahead of the governing body's 15 November deadline) of their intention to enter, but the FIA's initial entry list stated they had not approved Aguri's entry. However, the team received the consent of the ten existing teams to compete and paid the US$48 million bond required as a deposit. The team was confirmed by the FIA on 26 January 2006.

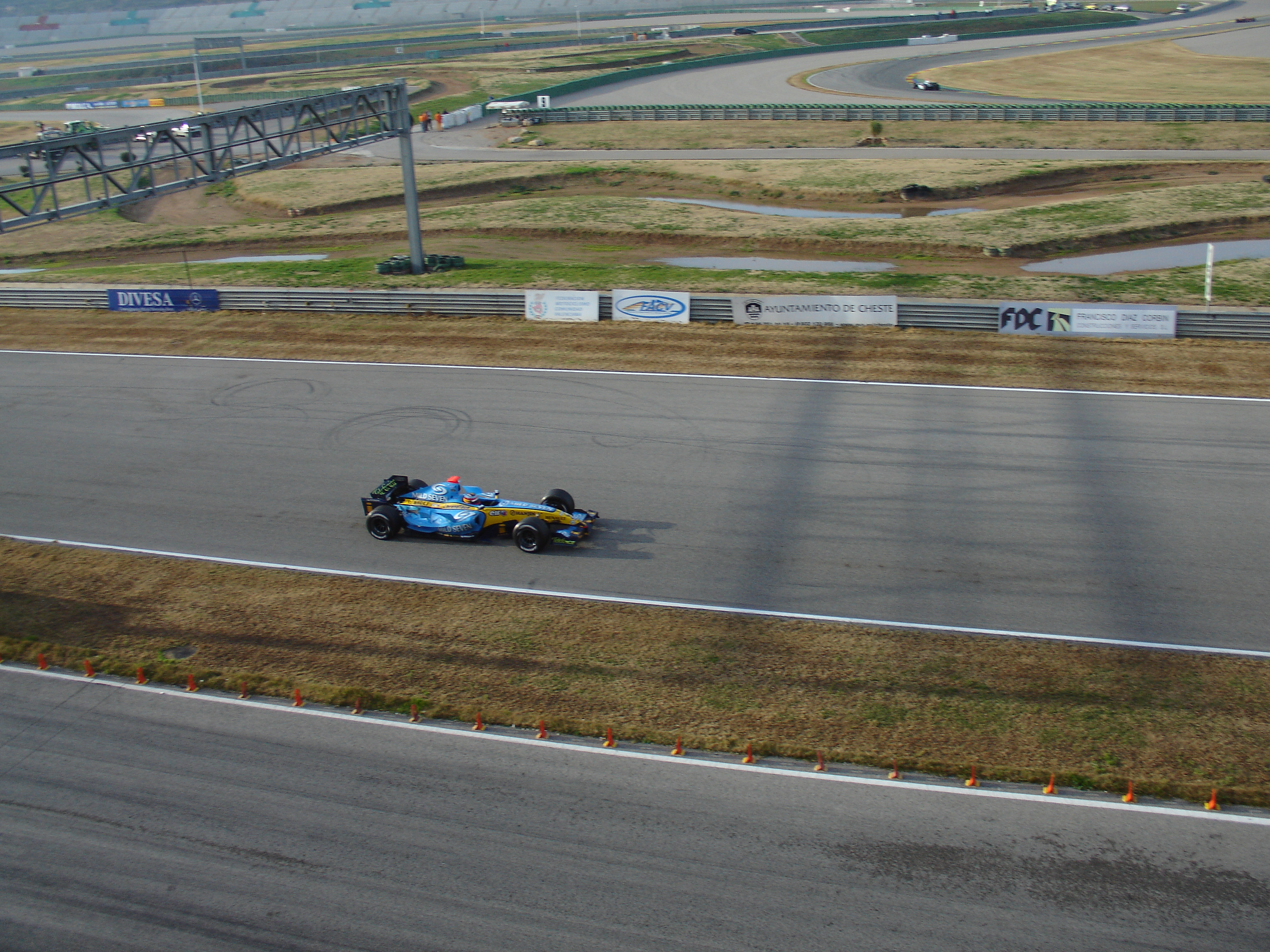
Fernando Alonso driving his Renault R26 car during a testing session held in February 2006 at Circuit de Valencia.

Between the 2005 and 2006 season the ownership of Formula One changed significantly. Until November 2005 the Formula One group was owned by an Ecclestone family trust and Speed Investments (a grouping of Bayerische Landesbank, JP Morgan Chase and Lehman Brothers). On 25 November, CVC Capital Partners announced it was to purchase both the Ecclestone shares (25% of SLEC) and Bayerische Landesbank's 48% share, held through Speed Investments. By 30 March, CVC had acquired all remaining shares and later that month the European Commission announced approval of this deal, conditional upon CVC relinquishing control of Dorna Sports, promoter of MotoGP. On 28 March CVC announced the completion of the Formula One transaction. Ecclestone reinvested proceeds of his stake into the new Formula One parent company Alpha Prema.

Another Ecclestone victory involved the Grand Prix Manufacturers' Association's proposal for an alternative world championship. On 27 March, the five car manufacturers involved lodged applications for the 2008 season, reducing the likelihood of a breakaway series. On 14 May, Grand Prix Manufacturers' Association (GPMA) members confirmed they had signed a Memorandum of Understanding, a move toward signing a new Concorde Agreement. Five days later, Bernie Ecclestone and CVC Capital Partners signed a Memorandum of Understanding with the GPMA which should see the five "rebels" continue racing in Formula One at least until the 2012 season.

== Season report ==
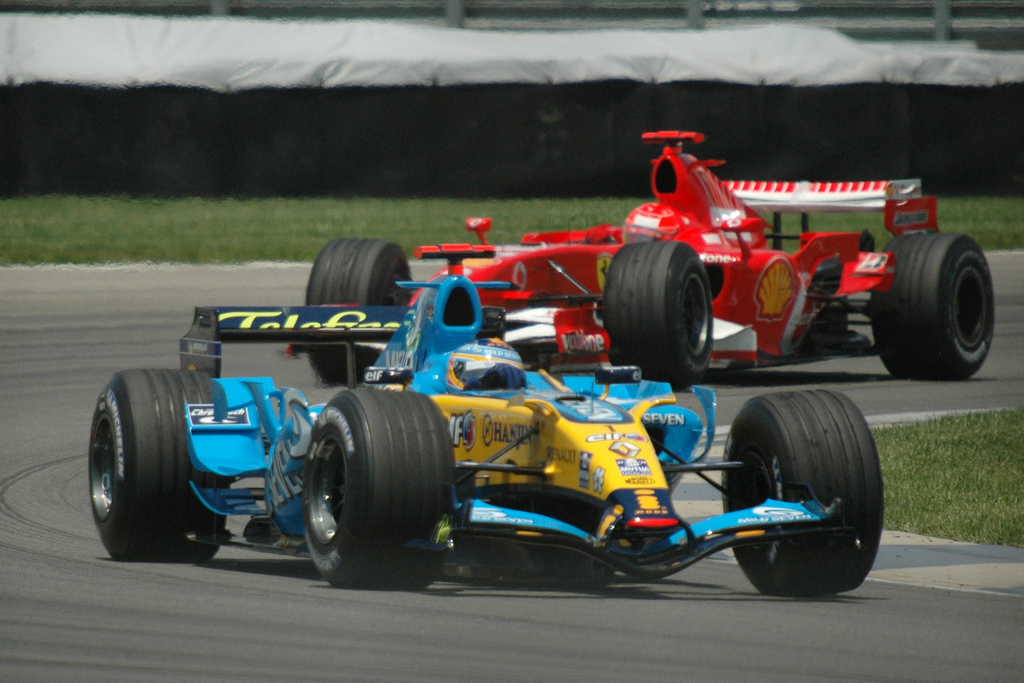
The 2006 season was a duel between Fernando Alonso (Renault) and Michael Schumacher (Ferrari).

=== Pre-season ===
The pre-season test was originally scheduled to be held at the Circuit de Catalunya in Barcelona, Spain from 24–26 February, but following the rescheduling of the Australian Grand Prix to avoid a clash with the 2006 Commonwealth Games in Port Phillip, it was instead held at the Bahrain International Circuit in Sakhir from 3–5 March, just before the first race of the season at the same venue.

=== Report ===
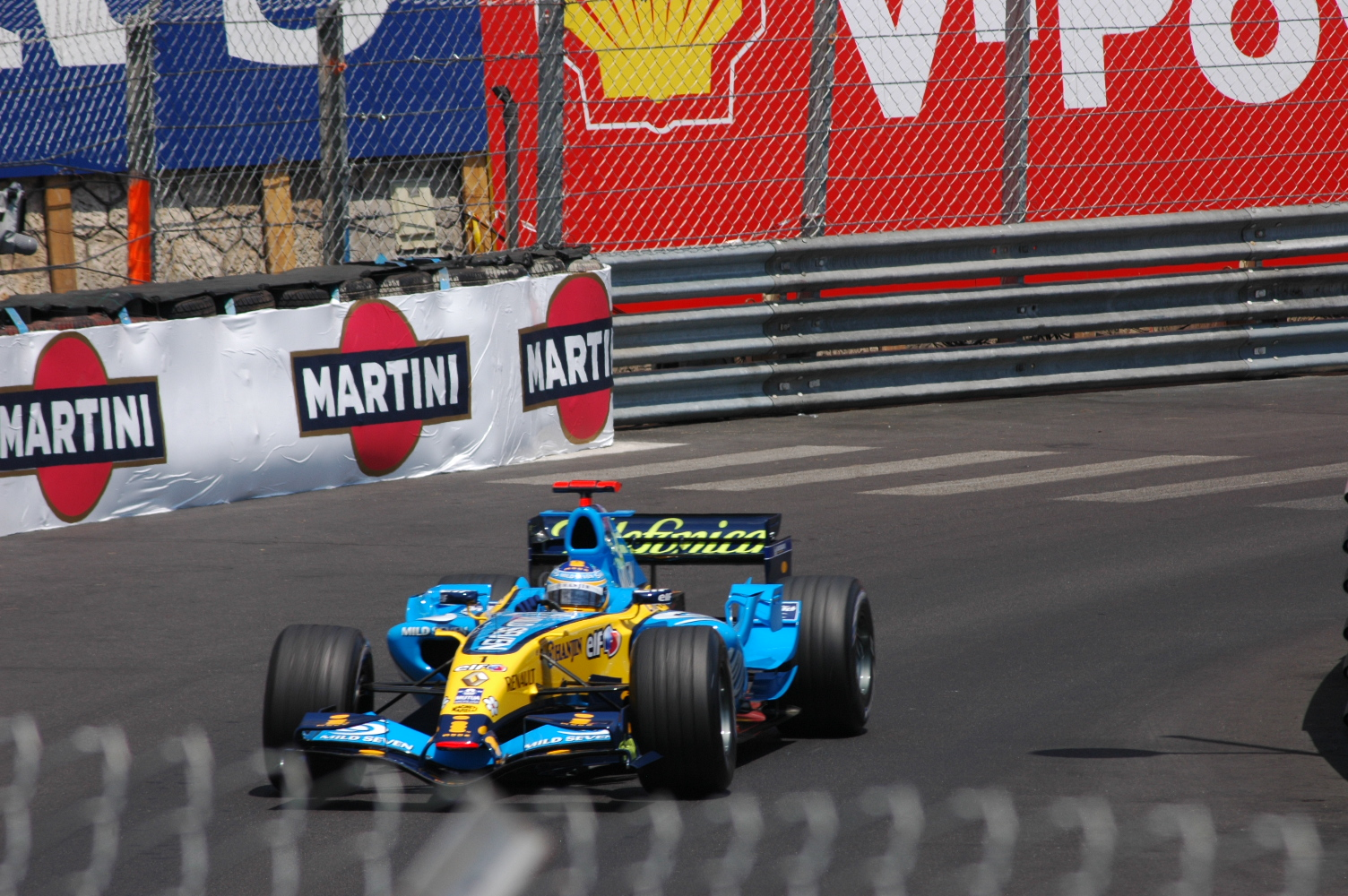
Alonso won a dominant victory at Monaco after Schumacher was demoted to the back of the grid for attempting to stop Alonso taking pole position.

After a mildly successful 2005 season and a slow start to the 2006 season, Michael Schumacher won consecutive races at Imola and the Nürburgring. During the final lap of his qualifying session for the Monaco Grand Prix, Schumacher came to a stop at the La Rascasse hairpin, resulting in yellow flags, meaning that other drivers could not go at maximum speed. After the session there were immediate complaints from the other teams claiming that this was a deliberate move by Schumacher to ensure he started in pole position – Alonso's flying lap that was affected by the yellow flags had been likely to beat Schumacher's fastest time – at the end of the second sector, Alonso was more than two-tenths of a second ahead of Schumacher's time, and his final time was just 0.064 seconds slower than Schumacher. Although Schumacher insisted that he had simply locked up his brakes at the corner, a stewards' inquiry stated, "We are left with no alternative but to conclude that the driver deliberately stopped his car on the circuit." The penalty was that Schumacher's qualifying times were all deleted, demoting him to 22nd position on the grid. He opted to start from the pitlane, and finished fifth, after an incident in the race that required the safety car to be deployed. The Safety Car failed to aid Schumacher however, but in fact hampered him; because he was the last car to be lapped by leader Alonso, and under 2006 FIA rules; he was not allowed to un-lap himself under Safety Car conditions. This meant he was almost a full lap down on third placed Coulthard, and fourth placed Barrichello on the resumption of the race. But by the end, he was threatening to pass them for position; finishing less than two seconds off a podium spot.

At the British Grand Prix, Alonso became the first Spanish driver and the youngest driver (24 years and 317 days) to win a race from pole and get fastest lap, leading every lap of the race except one. Schumacher won the United States Grand Prix, his fourth consecutive victory at Indianapolis and fifth career victory there, and the French Grand Prix. Indianapolis also marked the final F1 race for 7 time race winner Juan Pablo Montoya as he moved to the NASCAR Cup Series for 2007 after he decided that he'd, had enough with F1 resulting in his contract with McLaren being terminated early. He was replaced by Pedro De La Rosa for the rest of the season.

The FIA decided that the 'Mass Damper' system used by Renault up to this point of the season did not meet the technical regulations, and it was banned – a polemical decision, since the FIA itself was consulted about the system during its development, and authorised its use. The effect of the ban was clear at the next race where the Renaults struggled to even get points. Schumacher also won the German Grand Prix at Hockenheim, with Alonso finishing 5th. Hockenheim also marked the last race for 1997 world champion Jacques Villeneuve as he left BMW Sauber due to a heavy crash during the race and falling out with the team over a shootout with new talent Robert Kubica for the second BMW seat in 2007.

Jenson Button achieved his first Formula One career victory in the Hungarian Grand Prix. It was his 113th career start. Alonso had a mechanical failure whilst leading in the latter stages of the race whilst Michael Schumacher retired after a collision with Nick Heidfeld. However Schumacher was promoted to eighth place in the standings (having been classified ninth following a retirement three laps from the end) because Robert Kubica's debut ended in disqualification. The Polish driver had finished seventh in the BMW.

Felipe Massa won the next Grand Prix in Turkey, so for the second race in a row, Formula One had a maiden victor. Fernando Alonso extended his lead over Michael Schumacher by two points after he managed to finish a tenth of a second ahead of the German in second place.

At the Italian Grand Prix, Alonso was given a penalty for 'holding up' Massa during the final qualification session. Many in the Formula One 'paddock' were reported to disagree with the penalty and Max Mosley has since said that he would not have issued the same penalty as the race stewards. Schumacher reduced Alonso's lead to only two points after winning the race while Alonso suffered an engine failure in the late stages of the race. Despite a fourth-place finish for Alonso's teammate, Giancarlo Fisichella, and a flat-spotted tyre causing Felipe Massa to score no points, the race also saw Ferrari pull ahead of Renault for the first time in 2006. Polish driver Robert Kubica took his BMW Sauber to his first podium finish, in only his third race, but the race results were largely overshadowed by Schumacher announcing, during the post-race press conference, that he would retire at the end of the season. Afterwards he did say that he would hold a position in the Ferrari F1 team for 2007, though he did not disclose what.

Three weeks later, with his victory at Shanghai right ahead of Alonso, Schumacher drew level on points with him at the head of the championship. Schumacher led the World Championship for the first time in 2006 after the race, as he had won seven races compared to Alonso's six. Massa did not finish the race, and Renault gained again the lead in the Constructors' Championship thanks to Fisichella's third place. As Shanghai would prove to be the German's last victory of the season as well as the 91st and last victory of his career before retiring at the end of the season.

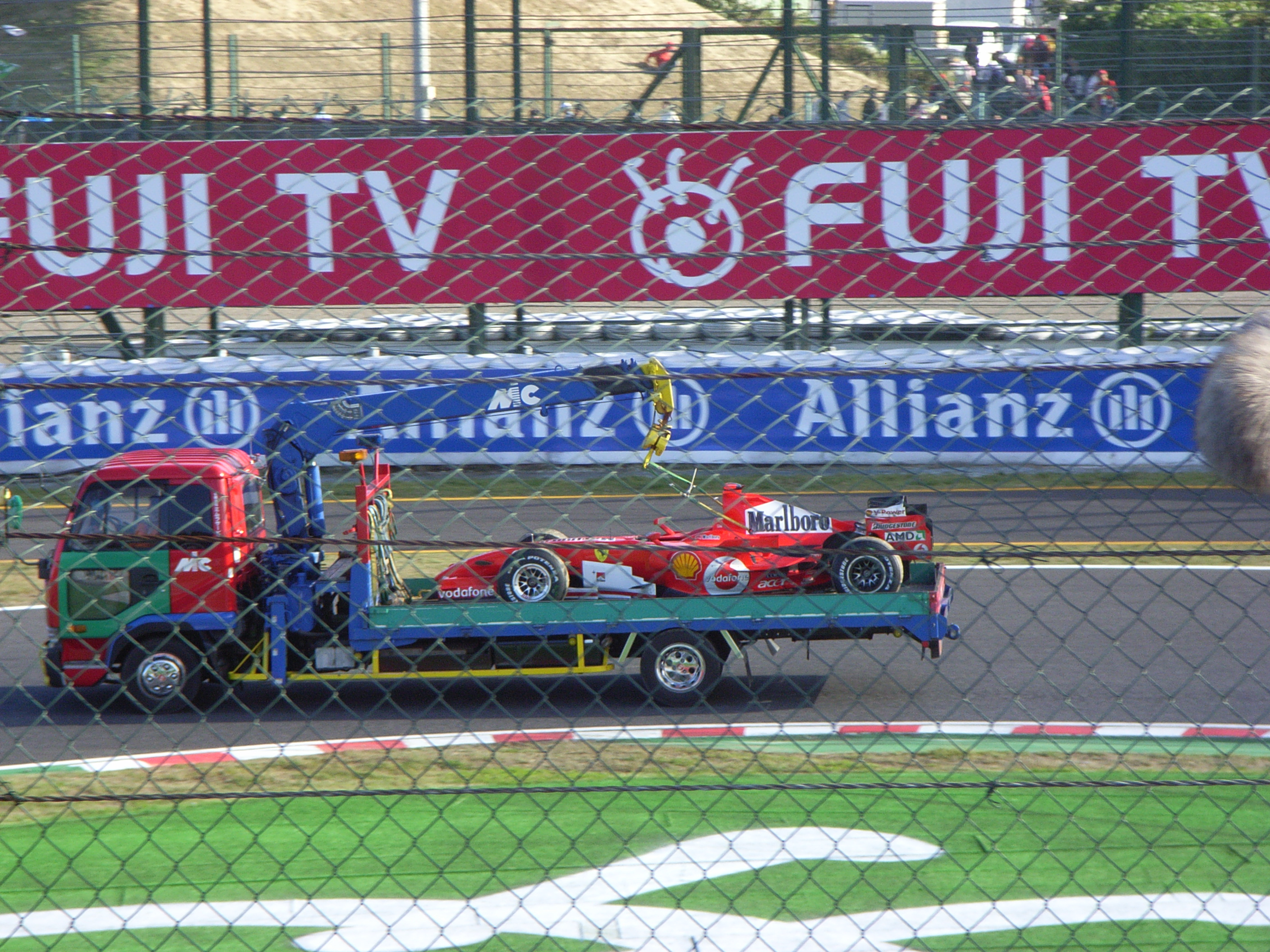
Schumacher retired in Japan, handing the championship lead and the momentum back to Alonso entering the final race of the season.

A week later at the Japanese Grand Prix, Felipe Massa took pole ahead of Michael Schumacher in second and Fernando Alonso in fifth. Schumacher quickly took the lead and set about gaining a five-second lead, which continued until after the second round of pit stops. However, Schumacher's engine failed with 17 laps to go, forcing him to retire and handing Alonso the win ahead of Massa.

At the final round, the Brazilian Grand Prix, Massa again took pole. Drama in qualifying saw Michael Schumacher have a mysterious failure, meaning that he started down in tenth, while Alonso began in fifth. In the race, Schumacher had yet more bad luck, suffering a puncture just a few laps in. He recovered to finish fourth, while teammate Massa became the first Brazilian to win his home Grand Prix since Ayrton Senna in 1993. Alonso finished second to secure his second successive championship, adding the record of the youngest man to secure back-to-back titles to his ever-increasing list of records. Fisichella finished sixth for Renault, meaning that the French outfit secured their second successive Constructors' title. McLaren failed to secure a single win in the season for the first time since 1996 and it was the first season since 1956 that a British constructor failed to win a race.

== Results and standings ==
=== Grands Prix ===
Round	Grand Prix	Pole position	Fastest lap	Winning driver	Winning constructor	Report
1	Bahrain Grand Prix	(Germany) Michael Schumacher	(Germany) Nico Rosberg	(Spain) Fernando Alonso	(France) Renault	Report
2	(Malaysia) Malaysian Grand Prix	(Italy) Giancarlo Fisichella	(Spain) Fernando Alonso	(Italy) Giancarlo Fisichella	(France) Renault	Report
3	(Australia) Australian Grand Prix	(United Kingdom) Jenson Button	(Finland) Kimi Räikkönen	(Spain) Fernando Alonso	(France) Renault	Report
4	(Italy) San Marino Grand Prix	(Germany) Michael Schumacher	(Spain) Fernando Alonso	(Germany) Michael Schumacher	(Italy) Ferrari	Report
5	(Germany) European Grand Prix	(Spain) Fernando Alonso	(Germany) Michael Schumacher	(Germany) Michael Schumacher	(Italy) Ferrari	Report
6	(Spain) Spanish Grand Prix	(Spain) Fernando Alonso	(Brazil) Felipe Massa	(Spain) Fernando Alonso	(France) Renault	Report
7	Monaco Grand Prix	(Spain) Fernando Alonso	(Germany) Michael Schumacher	(Spain) Fernando Alonso	(France) Renault	Report
8	(United Kingdom) British Grand Prix	(Spain) Fernando Alonso	(Spain) Fernando Alonso	(Spain) Fernando Alonso	(France) Renault	Report
9	(Canada) Canadian Grand Prix	(Spain) Fernando Alonso	(Finland) Kimi Räikkönen	(Spain) Fernando Alonso	(France) Renault	Report
10	United States Grand Prix	(Germany) Michael Schumacher	(Germany) Michael Schumacher	(Germany) Michael Schumacher	(Italy) Ferrari	Report
11	(France) French Grand Prix	(Germany) Michael Schumacher	(Germany) Michael Schumacher	(Germany) Michael Schumacher	(Italy) Ferrari	Report
12	(Germany) German Grand Prix	(Finland) Kimi Räikkönen	(Germany) Michael Schumacher	(Germany) Michael Schumacher	(Italy) Ferrari	Report
13	(Hungary) Hungarian Grand Prix	(Finland) Kimi Räikkönen	(Brazil) Felipe Massa	(United Kingdom) Jenson Button	(Japan) Honda	Report
14	(Turkey) Turkish Grand Prix	(Brazil) Felipe Massa	(Germany) Michael Schumacher	(Brazil) Felipe Massa	(Italy) Ferrari	Report
15	(Italy) Italian Grand Prix	(Finland) Kimi Räikkönen	(Finland) Kimi Räikkönen	(Germany) Michael Schumacher	(Italy) Ferrari	Report
16	(China) Chinese Grand Prix	(Spain) Fernando Alonso	(Spain) Fernando Alonso	(Germany) Michael Schumacher	(Italy) Ferrari	Report
17	(Japan) Japanese Grand Prix	(Brazil) Felipe Massa	(Spain) Fernando Alonso	(Spain) Fernando Alonso	(France) Renault	Report
18	(Brazil) Brazilian Grand Prix	(Brazil) Felipe Massa	(Germany) Michael Schumacher	(Brazil) Felipe Massa	(Italy) Ferrari	Report

=== Scoring system ===
Points were awarded to the top eight classified finishers using the following structure:

Position	1st	2nd	3rd	4th	5th	6th	7th	8th
Points	10	8	6	5	4	3	2	1

In the event of a tie, a count-back system was used as a tie-breaker, with a driver's best result used to decide the standings. (Note: In the event that two or more drivers achieve the same best result an equal number of times, their next-best result will be used. If two or more drivers achieve equal results an equal number of times, the FIA would have nominate the winner according to such criteria as it thought fit. Under this system one first place was better than any number of second places, one second place was better than any number of third places, etc.)

=== World Drivers' Championship standings ===
Pos.	Driver	BHR (Bahrain)	MAL (Malaysia)	AUS (Australia)	SMR (Italy)	EUR (Germany)	ESP (Spain)	MON (Monaco)	GBR (United Kingdom)	CAN (Canada)	USA (United States)	FRA (France)	GER (Germany)	HUN (Hungary)	TUR (Turkey)	ITA (Italy)	CHN (China)	JPN (Japan)	BRA (Brazil)	Points
1	(Spain) Fernando Alonso	1	2^{F}	1	2^{F}	2^{P}	1^{P}	1^{P}	1^{P}^{F}	1^{P}	5	2	5	Ret	2	Ret	2^{P}^{F}	1^{F}	2	134
2	(Germany) Michael Schumacher	2^{P}	6	Ret	1^{P}	1^{F}	2	5^{F}	2	2	1^{P}^{F}	1^{P}^{F}	1^{F}	8^{†}	3^{F}	1	1	Ret	4^{F}	121
3	(Brazil) Felipe Massa	9	5	Ret	4	3	4^{F}	9	5	5	2	3	2	7^{F}	1^{P}	9	Ret	2^{P}	1^{P}	80
4	(Italy) Giancarlo Fisichella	Ret	1^{P}	5	8	6	3	6	4	4	3	6	6	Ret	6	4	3	3	6	72
5	(Finland) Kimi Räikkönen	3	Ret	2^{F}	5	4	5	Ret	3	3^{F}	Ret	5	3^{P}	Ret^{P}	Ret	2^{P}^{F}	Ret	5	5	65
6	(United Kingdom) Jenson Button	4	3	10^{P}^{†}	7	Ret	6	11	Ret	9	Ret	Ret	4	1	4	5	4	4	3	56
7	(Brazil) Rubens Barrichello	15	10	7	10	5	7	4	10	Ret	6	Ret	Ret	4	8	6	6	12	7	30
8	(Colombia) Juan Pablo Montoya	5	4	Ret	3	Ret	Ret	2	6	Ret	Ret									26
9	(Germany) Nick Heidfeld	12	Ret	4	13	10	8	7	7	7	Ret	8	Ret	3	14	8	7	8	17^{†}	23
10	(Germany) Ralf Schumacher	14	8	3	9	Ret	Ret	8	Ret	Ret	Ret	4	9	6	7	15	Ret	7	Ret	20
11	(Spain) Pedro de la Rosa											7	Ret	2	5	Ret	5	11	8	19
12	(Italy) Jarno Trulli	16	9	Ret	Ret	9	10	17^{†}	11	6	4	Ret	7	12^{†}	9	7	Ret	6	Ret	15
13	(United Kingdom) David Coulthard	10	Ret	8	Ret	Ret	14	3	12	8	7	9	11	5	15^{†}	12	9	Ret	Ret	14
14	(Australia) Mark Webber	6	Ret	Ret	6	Ret	9	Ret	Ret	12	Ret	Ret	Ret	Ret	10	10	8	Ret	Ret	7
15	(Canada) Jacques Villeneuve	Ret	7	6	12	8	12	14	8	Ret	Ret	11	Ret							7
16	(Poland) Robert Kubica													DSQ	12	3	13	9	9	6
17	(Germany) Nico Rosberg	7^{F}	Ret	Ret	11	7	11	Ret	9	Ret	9	14	Ret	Ret	Ret	Ret	11	10	Ret	4
18	(Austria) Christian Klien	8	Ret	Ret	Ret	Ret	13	Ret	14	11	Ret	12	8	Ret	11	11				2
19	(Italy) Vitantonio Liuzzi	11	11	Ret	14	Ret	15^{†}	10	13	13	8	13	10	Ret	Ret	14	10	14	13	1
20	(United States) Scott Speed	13	Ret	9	15	11	Ret	13	Ret	10	Ret	10	12	11	13	13	14	18^{†}	11	0
21	(Portugal) Tiago Monteiro	17	13	Ret	16	12	16	15	16	14	Ret	Ret	DSQ	9	Ret	Ret	Ret	16	15	0
22	(Netherlands) Christijan Albers	Ret	12	11	Ret	13	Ret	12	15	Ret	Ret	15	DSQ	10	Ret	17	15	Ret	14	0
23	(Japan) Takuma Sato	18	14	12	Ret	Ret	17	Ret	17	15^{†}	Ret	Ret	Ret	13	NC	16	DSQ	15	10	0
24	(Netherlands) Robert Doornbos																12	13	12	0
25	(Japan) Yuji Ide	Ret	Ret	13	Ret															0
26	(Japan) Sakon Yamamoto												Ret	Ret	Ret	Ret	16	17	16	0
27	(France) Franck Montagny					Ret	Ret	16	18	Ret	Ret	16								0
Pos.	Driver	BHR (Bahrain)	MAL (Malaysia)	AUS (Australia)	SMR (Italy)	EUR (Germany)	ESP (Spain)	MON (Monaco)	GBR (United Kingdom)	CAN (Canada)	USA (United States)	FRA (France)	GER (Germany)	HUN (Hungary)	TUR (Turkey)	ITA (Italy)	CHN (China)	JPN (Japan)	BRA (Brazil)	Points

Key
Colour	Result
Gold	Winner
Silver	Second place
Bronze	Third place
Green	Other points position
Blue	Other classified position
Blue	Not classified, finished (NC)
Purple	Not classified, retired (Ret)
Red	Did not qualify (DNQ)
Black	Disqualified (DSQ)
White	Did not start (DNS)
White	Race cancelled (C)
Blank	Did not practice (DNP)
Blank	Excluded (EX)
Blank	Did not arrive (DNA)
Blank	Withdrawn (WD)
Blank	Did not enter (empty cell)
Annotation	Meaning
P	Pole position
F	Fastest lap

Notes:

- † – Drivers did not finish the Grand Prix, but were classified as they completed more than 90% of the race distance.

=== World Constructors' Championship standings ===
Pos.	Constructor	No.	BHR (Bahrain)	MAL (Malaysia)	AUS (Australia)	SMR (Italy)	EUR (Germany)	ESP (Spain)	MON (Monaco)	GBR (United Kingdom)	CAN (Canada)	USA (United States)	FRA (France)	GER (Germany)	HUN (Hungary)	TUR (Turkey)	ITA (Italy)	CHN (China)	JPN (Japan)	BRA (Brazil)	Points
1	(France) Renault	1	1	2^{F}	1	2^{F}	2^{P}	1^{P}	1^{P}	1^{P}^{F}	1^{P}	5	2	5	Ret	2	Ret	2^{P}^{F}	1^{F}	2	206
1	(France) Renault	2	Ret	1^{P}	5	8	6	3	6	4	4	3	6	6	Ret	6	4	3	3	6	206
2	(Italy) Ferrari	5	2^{P}	6	Ret	1^{P}	1^{F}	2	5^{F}	2	2	1^{P}^{F}	1^{P}^{F}	1^{F}	8^{†}	3^{F}	1	1	Ret	4^{F}	201
2	(Italy) Ferrari	6	9	5	Ret	4	3	4^{F}	9	5	5	2	3	2	7^{F}	1^{P}	9	Ret	2^{P}	1^{P}	201
3	(United Kingdom) McLaren-Mercedes	3	3	Ret	2^{F}	5	4	5	Ret	3	3^{F}	Ret	5	3^{P}	Ret^{P}	Ret	2^{P}^{F}	Ret	5	5	110
3	(United Kingdom) McLaren-Mercedes	4	5	4	Ret	3	Ret	Ret	2	6	Ret	Ret	7	Ret	2	5	Ret	5	11	8	110
4	(Japan) Honda	11	15	10	7	10	5	7	4	10	Ret	6	Ret	Ret	4	8	6	6	12	7	86
4	(Japan) Honda	12	4	3	10^{P}^{†}	7	Ret	6	11	Ret	9	Ret	Ret	4	1	4	5	4	4	3	86
5	(Germany) BMW Sauber	16	12	Ret	4	13	10	8	7	7	7	Ret	8	Ret	3	14	8	7	8	17^{†}	36
5	(Germany) BMW Sauber	17	Ret	7	6	12	8	12	14	8	Ret	Ret	11	Ret	DSQ	12	3	13	9	9	36
6	(Japan) Toyota	7	14	8	3	9	Ret	Ret	8	Ret	Ret	Ret	4	9	6	7	15	Ret	7	Ret	35
6	(Japan) Toyota	8	16	9	Ret	Ret	9	10	17^{†}	11	6	4	Ret	7	12^{†}	9	7	Ret	6	Ret	35
7	(United Kingdom) Red Bull-Ferrari	14	10	Ret	8	Ret	Ret	14	3	12	8	7	9	11	5	15^{†}	12	9	Ret	Ret	16
7	(United Kingdom) Red Bull-Ferrari	15	8	Ret	Ret	Ret	Ret	13	Ret	14	11	Ret	12	8	Ret	11	11	12	13	12	16
8	(United Kingdom) Williams-Cosworth	9	6	Ret	Ret	6	Ret	9	Ret	Ret	12	Ret	Ret	Ret	Ret	10	10	8	Ret	Ret	11
8	(United Kingdom) Williams-Cosworth	10	7^{F}	Ret	Ret	11	7	11	Ret	9	Ret	9	14	Ret	Ret	Ret	Ret	11	10	Ret	11
9	(Italy) Toro Rosso-Cosworth	20	11	11	Ret	14	Ret	15^{†}	10	13	13	8	13	10	Ret	Ret	14	10	14	13	1
9	(Italy) Toro Rosso-Cosworth	21	13	Ret	9	15	11	Ret	13	Ret	10	Ret	10	12	11	13	13	14	18^{†}	11	1
10	(Russia) MF1-Toyota	18	17	13	Ret	16	12	16	15	16	14	Ret	Ret	DSQ	9	Ret	Ret	Ret	16	15	0
10	(Russia) MF1-Toyota	19	Ret	12	11	Ret	13	Ret	12	15	Ret	Ret	15	DSQ	10	Ret	17	15	Ret	14	0
11	(Japan) Super Aguri-Honda	22	18	14	12	Ret	Ret	17	Ret	17	15^{†}	Ret	Ret	Ret	13	NC	16	DSQ	15	10	0
11	(Japan) Super Aguri-Honda	23	Ret	Ret	13	Ret	Ret	Ret	16	18	Ret	Ret	16	Ret	Ret	Ret	Ret	16	17	16	0
Pos.	Constructor	No.	BHR (Bahrain)	MAL (Malaysia)	AUS (Australia)	SMR (Italy)	EUR (Germany)	ESP (Spain)	MON (Monaco)	GBR (United Kingdom)	CAN (Canada)	USA (United States)	FRA (France)	GER (Germany)	HUN (Hungary)	TUR (Turkey)	ITA (Italy)	CHN (China)	JPN (Japan)	BRA (Brazil)	Points

Key
Colour	Result
Gold	Winner
Silver	Second place
Bronze	Third place
Green	Other points position
Blue	Other classified position
Blue	Not classified, finished (NC)
Purple	Not classified, retired (Ret)
Red	Did not qualify (DNQ)
Black	Disqualified (DSQ)
White	Did not start (DNS)
White	Race cancelled (C)
Blank	Did not practice (DNP)
Blank	Excluded (EX)
Blank	Did not arrive (DNA)
Blank	Withdrawn (WD)
Blank	Did not enter (empty cell)
Annotation	Meaning
P	Pole position
F	Fastest lap

Notes:

- † – Drivers did not finish the Grand Prix, but were classified as they completed more than 90% of the race distance.
- Official FIA results listed the constructors as Mild Seven Renault F1 Team, Scuderia Ferrari Marlboro, Team McLaren Mercedes, etc.
