= 2006 German Grand Prix =

Coordinates: 49°19′40″N 8°33′57″E

Race 12 of 18 in the 2006 Formula One World Championship
← Previous race	Next race →
- The Hockenheimring

Race details
- Date: 30 July 2006
- Official name: Formula 1 Grosser Mobil 1 Preis von Deutschland 2006
- Location: Hockenheimring, Hockenheim, Germany
- Course: Permanent racing facility
- Course length: 4.574 km (2.842 miles)
- Distance: 67 laps, 306.458 km (190.424 miles)
- Weather: Sunny, 32°C

Pole position
Driver	(Finland) Kimi Räikkönen	McLaren-Mercedes
- Time: 1:14.070

Fastest lap
Driver	(Germany) Michael Schumacher	Ferrari
- Time: 1:16.357 on lap 17

Podium
First	(Germany) Michael Schumacher	Ferrari
Second	(Brazil) Felipe Massa	Ferrari
Third	(Finland) Kimi Räikkönen	McLaren-Mercedes

The 2006 German Grand Prix (officially known as the Formula 1 Grosser Mobil 1 Preis von Deutschland 2006) was a Formula One motor race held at the Hockenheimring on 30 July 2006. The 67-lap race was the twelfth round of the 2006 Formula One season.

Kimi Räikkönen took pole position, but it proved artificial, as McLaren had inadvertently not put enough fuel as intended in his car before qualifying. In the race, his early pitstop left him unable to challenge for the win. Michael Schumacher scored his 89th career win ahead of teammate Felipe Massa.

The race also saw the last appearance by 1997 champion Jacques Villeneuve, who blamed the split on the "lack of assurances about his short-term future with BMW Sauber". Robert Kubica was promoted to drive in all the remaining Grands Prix.

== Background ==
The Grand Prix weekend got off to a controversial start when the mass damper system fitted by Renault was deemed legal by the FIA appointed stewards, despite the FIA banning the use of these devices. The FIA appealed against their own steward's decision and Renault withdrew the system after Friday practice to avoid further sanctions.

=== Driver changes ===
Super Aguri's third driver Sakon Yamamoto replaced Franck Montagny to make his Formula One debut. Montagny took over the role of third driver from the Turkish Grand Prix on.

== Practice ==
Three practice sessions were held before the Sunday race: two on Friday, both lasting 90 minutes, and one on Saturday for 60 minutes. The first session was led by Williams's Alexander Wurz, the second by BMW Sauber's third driver Robert Kubica and the third by Christian Klien at Red Bull Racing.

=== Friday drivers ===
The bottom 6 teams in the 2005 Constructors' Championship and Super Aguri were entitled to run a third car in free practice on Friday. These drivers drove on Friday but did not compete in qualifying or the race.

Constructor	Nat	Driver
Williams-Cosworth	(Austria)	Alexander Wurz
Honda	(United Kingdom)	Anthony Davidson
Red Bull-Ferrari	(Netherlands)	Robert Doornbos
BMW Sauber	(Poland)	Robert Kubica
MF1-Toyota	(Germany)	Markus Winkelhock
Toro Rosso-Cosworth	(Switzerland)	Neel Jani
Super Aguri-Honda		-

== Qualifying ==
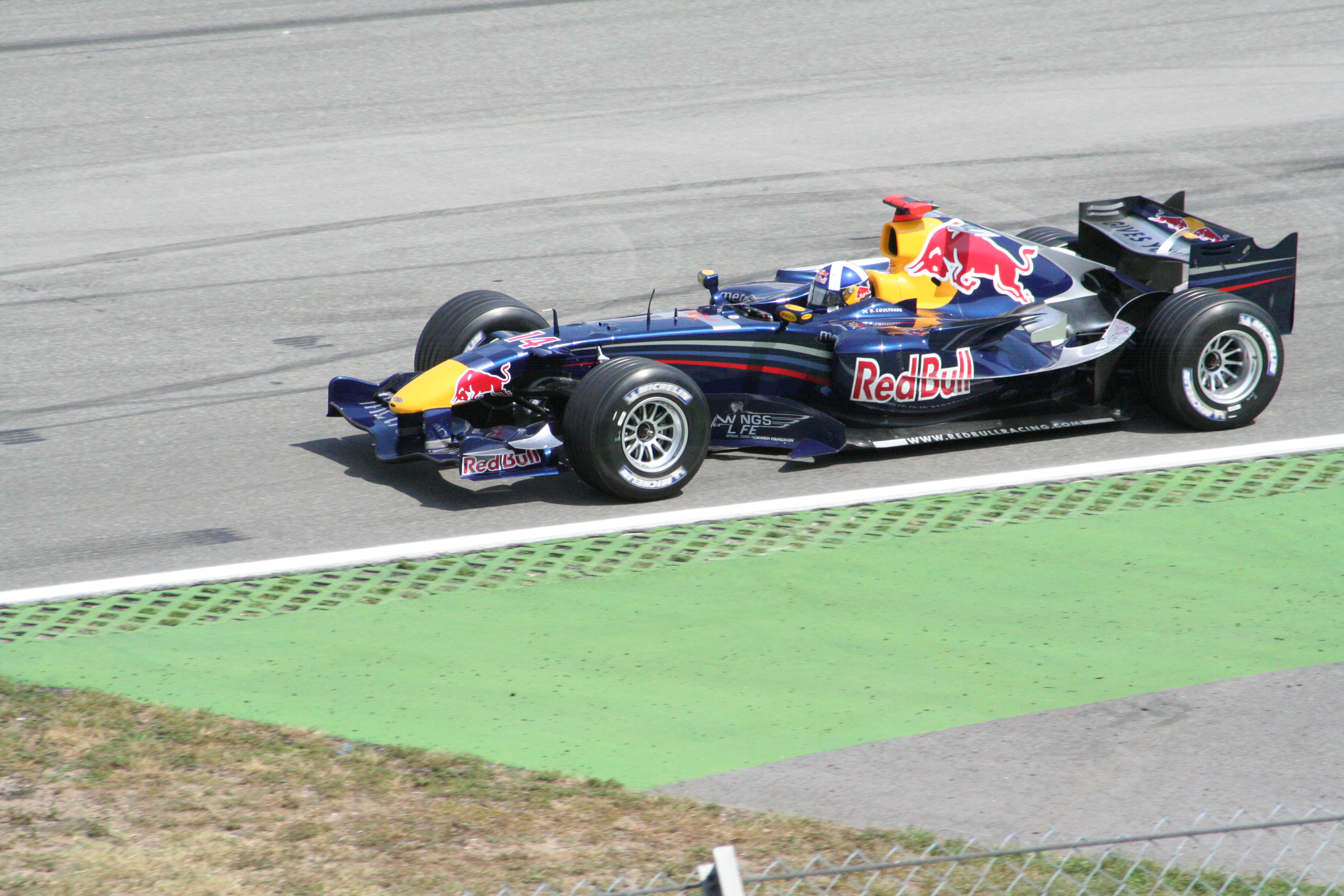
David Coulthard qualified in the top ten in Red Bull Racing's second season of Formula One.

Saturday afternoon's qualifying session was divided into three parts. The first part ran for 15 minutes, and cars that finished the session 17th position or lower were eliminated from qualifying. The second part of the qualifying session lasted 15 minutes and eliminated cars that finished in positions 11 to 16. The final part of the qualifying session ran for 20 minutes which determined the positions from first to tenth, and decided pole position. Cars which failed to make the final session could refuel before the race, so ran lighter in those sessions.

Kimi Räikkönen scored his ninth career pole position ahead of the Ferraris of Michael Schumacher and Felipe Massa.

Pos.	No.	Driver	Constructor	Q1	Q2	Q3	Grid
1	3	(Finland) Kimi Räikkönen	McLaren-Mercedes	1:15.214	1:14.410	1:14.070	1
2	5	(Germany) Michael Schumacher	Ferrari	1:14.904	1:13.778	1:14.205	2
3	6	(Brazil) Felipe Massa	Ferrari	1:14.412	1:14.094	1:14.569	3
4	12	(United Kingdom) Jenson Button	Honda	1:15.869	1:14.378	1:14.862	4
5	2	(Italy) Giancarlo Fisichella	Renault	1:15.916	1:14.540	1:14.894	5
6	11	(Brazil) Rubens Barrichello	Honda	1:15.757	1:14.652	1:14.934	6
7	1	(Spain) Fernando Alonso	Renault	1:15.518	1:14.746	1:15.282	7
8	7	(Germany) Ralf Schumacher	Toyota	1:15.789	1:14.743	1:15.923	8
9	4	(Spain) Pedro de la Rosa	McLaren-Mercedes	1:15.655	1:15.021	1:15.936	9
10	14	(United Kingdom) David Coulthard	Red Bull-Ferrari	1:15.836	1:14.826	1:16.326	10
11	9	(Australia) Mark Webber	Williams-Cosworth	1:15.719	1:15.094		11
12	15	(Austria) Christian Klien	Red Bull-Ferrari	1:15.816	1:15.141		12
13	8	(Italy) Jarno Trulli	Toyota	1:15.430	1:15.150		20^{2}
14	17	(Canada) Jacques Villeneuve	BMW Sauber	1:16.281	1:15.329		13
15	10	(Germany) Nico Rosberg	Williams-Cosworth	1:16.183	1:15.380		14
16	16	(Germany) Nick Heidfeld	BMW Sauber	1:16.234	1:15.397		15
17	20	(Italy) Vitantonio Liuzzi	Toro Rosso-Cosworth	1:16.399			16
18	19	(Netherlands) Christijan Albers	MF1-Toyota	1:17.093			21^{2}
19	22	(Japan) Takuma Sato	Super Aguri-Honda	1:17.185			17
20	18	(Portugal) Tiago Monteiro	MF1-Toyota	1:17.836			18
21	23	(Japan) Sakon Yamamoto	Super Aguri-Honda	1:20.444			22^{2}
22	21	(United States) Scott Speed	Toro Rosso-Cosworth	No time^{1}			19

Notes

- ^1 – Scott Speed did not get a time in Q1 after going out in the first corner.
- ^2 – Jarno Trulli, Christijan Albers and Sakon Yamamoto received a 10-place grid penalty for engine changes.

== Race ==
=== Race report ===
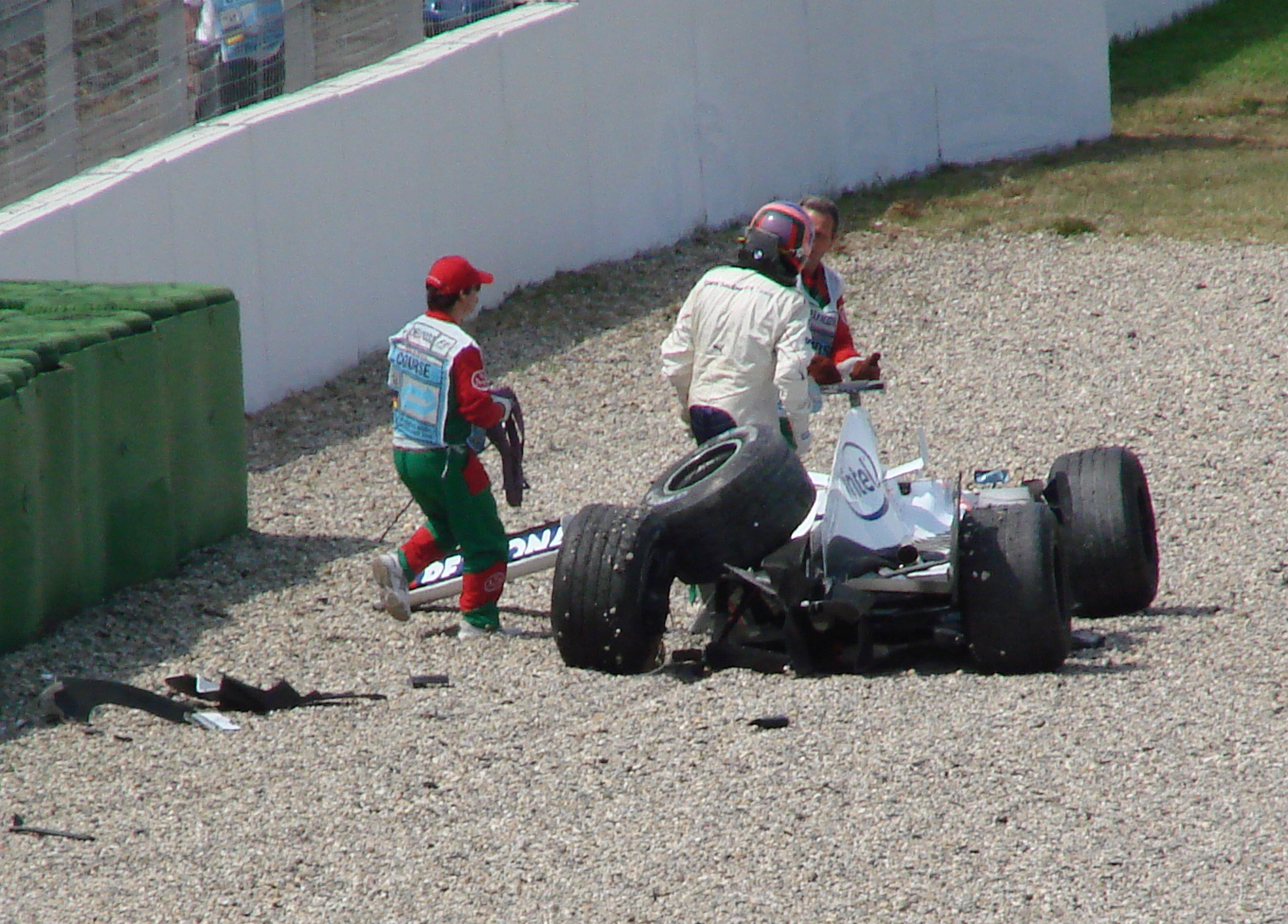
Jacques Villeneuve walks away from his crashed F1.06 in his final F1 race.

Many questioned the sudden pace of Kimi Räikkönen and the sudden lack of it at the Renault team. Soon after the start of the race, the first question was answered: McLaren had put a minimum amount of fuel in Räikkönen's car, forcing him to make a pit stop after just ten laps. And it became a long stop when his crew had problems changing the right rear tyre. All this meant that the Ferrari duo of Michael Schumacher and Felipe Massa sailed off into the distance, with Jenson Button in the Honda and the Renaults of Giancarlo Fisichella and Fernando Alonso chasing behind.

Schumacher made his first stop without losing the lead. Meanwhile, Alonso was down in sixth behind Mark Webber. The Australian had started down in eleventh but later even passed Fisichella for fourth. During the second round of pit stops, Fisichella went off track and was passed by his teammate.

Schumacher and Massa scored a comfortable 1-2. It was the German's 89th career win. Räikkönen used the unplanned third-stop strategy to its best to fight off Webber and overtake Button to take the third step on the podium. In the final stages, Webber's car developed an engine problem and he retired on lap 59.

Jacques Villeneuve had crashed his BMW on lap 30. It would turn out to be the last race of his career.

Midland drivers Christijan Albers and Tiago Monteiro were disqualified after the race for having illegally flexing rear wings.

=== Race classification ===
Pos.	No.	Driver	Constructor	Tyre	Laps	Time/Retired	Grid	Points
1	5	(Germany) Michael Schumacher	Ferrari	B	67	1:27:51.693	2	10
2	6	(Brazil) Felipe Massa	Ferrari	B	67	+0.720	3	8
3	3	(Finland) Kimi Räikkönen	McLaren-Mercedes	MI	67	+13.206	1	6
4	12	(United Kingdom) Jenson Button	Honda	MI	67	+18.898	4	5
5	1	(Spain) Fernando Alonso	Renault	MI	67	+23.707	7	4
6	2	(Italy) Giancarlo Fisichella	Renault	MI	67	+24.814	5	3
7	8	(Italy) Jarno Trulli	Toyota	B	67	+26.544	20	2
8	15	(Austria) Christian Klien	Red Bull-Ferrari	MI	67	+48.131	12	1
9	7	(Germany) Ralf Schumacher	Toyota	B	67	+1:00.351	8	
10	20	(Italy) Vitantonio Liuzzi	Toro Rosso-Cosworth	MI	66	+1 lap	16	
11	14	(United Kingdom) David Coulthard	Red Bull-Ferrari	MI	66	+1 lap	10	
12	21	(United States) Scott Speed	Toro Rosso-Cosworth	MI	66	+1 lap	19	
Ret	9	(Australia) Mark Webber	Williams-Cosworth	B	59	Water Leak	11	
Ret	22	(Japan) Takuma Sato	Super Aguri-Honda	B	38	Gearbox	17	
Ret	17	(Canada) Jacques Villeneuve	BMW Sauber	MI	30	Accident	13	
Ret	11	(Brazil) Rubens Barrichello	Honda	MI	18	Engine	6	
Ret	16	(Germany) Nick Heidfeld	BMW Sauber	MI	9	Brakes	15	
Ret	4	(Spain) Pedro de la Rosa	McLaren-Mercedes	MI	2	Fuel Pump	9	
Ret	23	(Japan) Sakon Yamamoto	Super Aguri-Honda	B	1	Driveshaft	PL^{3}	
Ret	10	(Germany) Nico Rosberg	Williams-Cosworth	B	0	Accident	14	
DSQ	19	(Netherlands) Christijan Albers	MF1-Toyota	B	66	Illegal rear wing (+1 lap)^{4}	21	
DSQ	18	(Portugal) Tiago Monteiro	MF1-Toyota	B	65	Illegal rear wing (+2 laps)^{4}	18	

Notes

- ^3 – Sakon Yamamoto started the race from the pit lane after changing the chassis of his Super Aguri after qualifying.
- ^4 – Christijan Albers and Tiago Monteiro originally finished 13th and 14th respectively were disqualified for having illegally flexing rear wings.

== Championship standings after the race ==
Drivers' Championship standings

	Pos.	Driver	Points
	1	(Spain) Fernando Alonso*	100
	2	(Germany) Michael Schumacher*	89
2	3	(Brazil) Felipe Massa*	50
1	4	(Italy) Giancarlo Fisichella*	49
1	5	(Finland) Kimi Räikkönen*	49

Constructors' Championship standings

Pos.	Constructor	Points
1	(France) Renault*	149
2	(Italy) Ferrari*	139
3	(United Kingdom) McLaren-Mercedes*	77
4	(Japan) Honda	37
5	(Japan) Toyota	23

- Note: Only the top five positions are included for both sets of standings.
- Bold text and an asterisk indicates competitors who still had a theoretical chance of becoming World Champion.

== See also ==
- 2006 Hockenheimring GP2 Series round

Previous race: 2006 French Grand Prix	FIA Formula One World Championship; 2006 season	Next race: 2006 Hungarian Grand Prix
Previous race: 2005 German Grand Prix	German Grand Prix	Next race: 2008 German Grand Prix
