= 2006 Chinese Grand Prix =

Coordinates: 31°20′20″N 121°13′11″E

Race 16 of 18 in the 2006 Formula One World Championship
← Previous race	Next race →
- The Shanghai International Circuit

Race details
- Date: 1 October 2006
- Official name: 2006 Formula 1 Sinopec Chinese Grand Prix
- Location: Shanghai International Circuit; Shanghai, People's Republic of China
- Course: Permanent Racing Facility
- Course length: 5.451 km (3.387 miles)
- Distance: 56 laps, 305.066 km (189.559 miles)
- Weather: Cloudy, wet track that progressively dried up. Rainy during the last few laps.

Pole position
Driver	(Spain) Fernando Alonso	Renault
- Time: 1:44.360

Fastest lap
Driver	(Spain) Fernando Alonso	Renault
- Time: 1:37.586 on lap 49

Podium
First	(Germany) Michael Schumacher	Ferrari
Second	(Spain) Fernando Alonso	Renault
Third	(Italy) Giancarlo Fisichella	Renault

The 2006 Chinese Grand Prix (officially the 2006 Formula 1 Sinopec Chinese Grand Prix) was the sixteenth race of the 2006 FIA Formula One World Championship. It was held on 1 October 2006 at Shanghai International Circuit, Shanghai. The race was won by Michael Schumacher, driving a Ferrari, and would turn out to be the 91st and last victory of his Formula One career. It was also his last podium finish until the 2012 European Grand Prix, during his comeback to the sport, and the last win for a German driver until Sebastian Vettel won the 2008 Italian Grand Prix.

== Report ==
=== Background ===
Renault were very confident about their chances in this Grand Prix, they claimed that Michael Schumacher's previous two races in Shanghai were "poor". Schumacher did admit that he had bad form in China, but said that he expected it "to be better this time around."

Following back-to-back wins in Turkey and on home soil, Ferrari certainly had the momentum coming into the Grand Prix, the Italian team were also ahead of Renault by 3 points in the constructors championship and Michael Schumacher was 2 points behind Fernando Alonso in the Drivers' Championship.

Following Lewis Hamilton's GP2 victory in Monza and an encouraging test session with McLaren, the Woking-based team were rumoured to give the young British driver his debut in favour of Pedro de la Rosa, who had been performing well after replacing Juan Pablo Montoya. However, McLaren announced that de la Rosa would be racing in China. McLaren's other driver, Kimi Räikkönen, was aiming to win the weekend's Grand Prix following signs of speed in his previous Grand Prix.

Williams announced that they were using a revised FW28, the Williams-Cosworth FW28A. The car featured a new aerodynamic package developed by test drivers Alexander Wurz and Narain Karthikeyan. The test team also carried out the first track test of the Toyota-powered interim Williams FW28B. The car itself completed 745 kilometres and the team only experienced minor problems.

Following some impressive Friday test performances at Turkey and Italy, BMW Sauber's 19-year-old test driver, Sebastian Vettel, had agreed to see out the rest of the year with the German team. The young German driver had a busy schedule, as he was also competing in the Formula 3 Euroseries.

With the sacking of Christian Klien, Red Bull announced that Robert Doornbos would replace him for the final 3 Grands Prix. Replacing Doornbos's role as the third driver was GP2 driver Michael Ammermüller.

Toro Rosso announced during the week leading up to the Grand Prix, that they had signed Alex Hitzinger as their new technical director to replace Gabriele Tredozi. Hitzinger began his role in November 2006.

Midland made a name change before the start of the weekend, and changed the name of the team to Spyker MF1 Racing, at the same time the name change to Spyker also meant a change of colors from Midland's red and white to a mix of orange and silver. Spyker MF1 announced their first driver for 2007 during the weekend, which was Dutch driver Christijan Albers.

Super Aguri's Takuma Sato had a dismal start to the weekend as he was demoted ten places on the grid as his team changed the Honda engine in his car. Sato had been due to continue using the Honda V8 he ran at the last round in Italy, but the discovery of a problem, which had not been disclosed by Super Aguri, had prompted the team to replace the engine ahead of the Friday first practice session.

=== Friday practice ===
Alexander Wurz was fastest in the first Friday practice session in the Williams-Cosworth, 0.004 seconds faster than BMW Sauber's third driver, Sebastien Vettel and Jenson Button completed the top three, over six-tenths slower than Wurz. Michael Schumacher, Neel Jani and Alexandre Prémat completed the top six; all within 0.07 seconds of each other. While Schumacher's championship rival, Fernando Alonso, did not set a time along with his teammate, Giancarlo Fisichella.

Wurz and Vettel were fastest again in the second session, Wurz was fastest with a 1:35.539, around 0.03 seconds faster than he was in the first session and 0.05 seconds faster than Vettel with Honda's Anthony Davidson completing the top three positions. The Austrian was very happy with his time, specially since this was his first time in Shanghai, "It was a good day today and driving was a lot of fun out there. I have never driven this circuit, and I attacked it right from the beginning" he said. Championship rivals, Michael Schumacher and Fernando Alonso, were within a tenth of a second of each other in fifth and sixth, respectively. Felipe Massa dropped ten places from the grid after his engine gave way during the session.

=== Friday drivers ===
The bottom 6 teams in the 2005 Constructors' Championship and Super Aguri were entitled to run a third car in free practice on Friday. These drivers drove on Friday but did not compete in qualifying or the race.

Constructor	Nat	Driver
Williams-Cosworth	(Austria)	Alexander Wurz
Honda	(United Kingdom)	Anthony Davidson
Red Bull-Ferrari	(Germany)	Michael Ammermüller
BMW Sauber	(Germany)	Sebastian Vettel
Spyker MF1-Toyota	(France)	Alexandre Premat
Toro Rosso-Cosworth	(Switzerland)	Neel Jani
Super Aguri-Honda	(France)	Franck Montagny

=== Race ===
It rained heavily before the start of the race, suiting the Michelin runners and disadvantaging the Bridgestone runners. Fernando Alonso led away at the start, followed by Giancarlo Fisichella. Kimi Räikkönen passed both Hondas at the start and immediately started to pressure Fisichella. Robert Kubica and Robert Doornbos collided, resulting in Kubica being knocked off the track and Doornbos losing his front wing. On lap 8, Michael Schumacher overtook Rubens Barichello for fifth. On lap 14, Schumacher passed Jenson Button for fourth. On the same lap Räikkönen finally managed to pass Fisichella, having been stuck behind him ever since the start. Räikkönen immediately began to pull away from Fisichella and erode the 15 second gap to Alonso. At this point in the race, Alonso was over 25 seconds ahead of Schumacher. However, the track was now drying and beginning to favour the Bridgestones more and more. By lap 19, Schumacher had caught up to Fisichella. He was also gaining on Alonso, who was beginning to struggle with his tyres and had several off-track moments. Schumacher gained another place when Räikkönen retired with a mechanical failure. Räikkönen later said that he felt he could have won the race, as he had been steadily gaining on Alonso before his retirement.

The new leading trio of Alonso, Fisichella and Schumacher made their first pit stops on laps 22, 23 and 21, respectively. Fisichella and Schumacher both kept all the same tyres, but Alonso, whose tyres were already fading, was unsure about whether they could last all the way to the second pit stops, so he changed the front tyres, but left the same rear tyres. However, this disadvantaged him even more, and within a few laps his 20-second lead had evaporated to nothing. For several laps, Alonso, Fisichella and Schumacher ran nose to tail. On lap 29, Fisichella tried to pass Alonso down the back straight, but braked too late and ran wide, allowing Alonso to regain the lead. The following lap, he pulled off the maneuver successfully and immediately began to pull away. Only a few corners later, at the start of lap 31, Schumacher passed Alonso and chased after Fisichella. He was able to stay with him but unable to seriously threaten to overtake.

Alonso dropped back all the time and on lap 35, having seen several drivers switch to dry tyres and be able to handle the drying conditions, pitted and made the switch. However a wheel nut problem at his stop caused it to last over 19 seconds. When he emerged from his stop he was down in 4th and over 50 seconds off the lead. Schumacher and Fisichella were among the last drivers to switch to dry tyres, pitting on laps 40 and 41 respectively. Fisichella emerged from his stop still ahead of Schumacher, but struggling with his cold tyres ran wide at the first corner, allowing Schumacher through into the lead.

Alonso had now rediscovered his pace and charged in the closing stages, setting fastest lap after fastest lap. Fisichella let him past without a fight, but although he continued to close rapidly on Schumacher, he ran out of time to catch him, finishing just 3 seconds behind. Fisichella had dropped back hugely in the closing laps but hung on to a comfortable third place.

Nick Heidfeld had started eighth on the grid but through his strategy of pitting late at both pitstops had rising to fourth in the closing stages, leapfrogging Rubens Barrichello, Jenson Button and Pedro de la Rosa. However, in the closing stages Heidfeld was firstly forced off the track while trying to lap Christijan Albers, then held up by Takuma Sato's Super Aguri, allowing Barrichello, Button and de la Rosa to close up to him. Button first managed to find his way past Barrichello on the last lap, then, at the penultimate corner, boxed Heidfeld in behind Sato, taking fourth. Barrichello then braked too late at the same corner, running into the back of Heidfeld, knocking the BMW Sauber's right rear wheel askew and damaging his own front wing. This allowed de la Rosa through to take fifth, Barrichello sixth, and the furious Heidfeld limped home seventh.

=== Post-race ===
The result put Michael Schumacher equal on points with Fernando Alonso, and put him in the championship lead on countback. However, Fisichella's third place allowed Renault to regain the lead of the Constructors' Championship by one point from Ferrari, as well as vaulting Fisichella ahead of Felipe Massa in the battle for third in the Drivers' Championship, also by one point. After the race, Schumacher expressed his surprise at the performance of his car in the wet, after its dismal showing in qualifying. Alonso expressed his regret over the decision to change only the front tyres at his first stop, but also his encouragement at the pace his car had shown throughout the weekend. Both championship contenders were confident heading into the final two races of the season.

After the race, Nick Heidfeld rushed to Sakon Yamamoto, accusing him of causing the accident in the last lap. Heidfeld was further angered by Yamamoto's lack of response, but eventually apologized when he learned that Takuma Sato had caused the crash.

== Classification ==
=== Qualifying ===
Pos.	No.	Driver	Constructor	Q1	Q2	Q3	Grid
1	1	(Spain) Fernando Alonso	Renault	1:44.128	1:43.951	1:44.360	1
2	2	(Italy) Giancarlo Fisichella	Renault	1:44.378	1:44.336	1:44.992	2
3	11	(Brazil) Rubens Barrichello	Honda	1:47.072	1:45.228	1:45.503	3
4	12	(United Kingdom) Jenson Button	Honda	1:45.809	1:44.662	1:45.503	4
5	3	(Finland) Kimi Räikkönen	McLaren-Mercedes	1:44.909	1:45.622	1:45.754	5
6	5	(Germany) Michael Schumacher	Ferrari	1:47.366	1:45.660	1:45.775	6
7	4	(Spain) Pedro de la Rosa	McLaren-Mercedes	1:44.808	1:45.095	1:45.877	7
8	16	(Germany) Nick Heidfeld	BMW Sauber	1:46.249	1:45.055	1:46.053	8
9	17	(Poland) Robert Kubica	BMW Sauber	1:46.049	1:45.576	1:46.632	9
10	15	(Netherlands) Robert Doornbos	Red Bull-Ferrari	1:46.387	1:45.747	1:48.021	10
11	21	(United States) Scott Speed	Toro Rosso-Cosworth	1:46.222	1:45.851		11
12	14	(United Kingdom) David Coulthard	Red Bull-Ferrari	1:45.931	1:45.968		12
13	6	(Brazil) Felipe Massa	Ferrari	1:47.231	1:45.970		20^{1}
14	20	(Italy) Vitantonio Liuzzi	Toro Rosso-Cosworth	1:45.564	1:46.172		13
15	9	(Australia) Mark Webber	Williams-Cosworth	1:48.560	1:46.413		14
16	10	(Germany) Nico Rosberg	Williams-Cosworth	1:47.535	1:47.419		15
17	7	(Germany) Ralf Schumacher	Toyota	1:48.894			16
18	8	(Italy) Jarno Trulli	Toyota	1:49.098			17
19	19	(Netherlands) Christijan Albers	Spyker MF1-Toyota	1:49.542			22^{2}
20	18	(Portugal) Tiago Monteiro	Spyker MF1-Toyota	1:49.903			18
21	22	(Japan) Takuma Sato	Super Aguri-Honda	1:50.326			21^{1}
22	23	(Japan) Sakon Yamamoto	Super Aguri-Honda	1:55.560			19

Notes

- ^1 – Felipe Massa and Takuma Sato each received a 10-place grid penalty for engine changes.
- ^2 – Christijan Albers was demoted to the back of the grid for failing to bring his car into the weighbridge when instructed to do so.

=== Race ===
Pos.	No.	Driver	Constructor	Tyre	Lap	Time/Retired	Grid	Points
1	5	(Germany) Michael Schumacher	Ferrari	B	56	1:37:32.747	6	10
2	1	(Spain) Fernando Alonso	Renault	MI	56	+3.121	1	8
3	2	(Italy) Giancarlo Fisichella	Renault	MI	56	+44.197	2	6
4	12	(United Kingdom) Jenson Button	Honda	MI	56	+1:12.056	4	5
5	4	(Spain) Pedro de la Rosa	McLaren-Mercedes	MI	56	+1:17.137	7	4
6	11	(Brazil) Rubens Barrichello	Honda	MI	56	+1:19.131	3	3
7	16	(Germany) Nick Heidfeld	BMW Sauber	MI	56	+1:31.979	8	2
8	9	(Australia) Mark Webber	Williams-Cosworth	B	56	+1:43.588	14	1
9	14	(United Kingdom) David Coulthard	Red Bull-Ferrari	MI	56	+1:43.796	12	
10	20	(Italy) Vitantonio Liuzzi	Toro Rosso-Cosworth	MI	55	+1 lap	13	
11	10	(Germany) Nico Rosberg	Williams-Cosworth	B	55	+1 lap	15	
12	15	(Netherlands) Robert Doornbos	Red Bull-Ferrari	MI	55	+1 lap	10	
13	17	(Poland) Robert Kubica	BMW Sauber	MI	55	+1 lap	9	
14	21	(United States) Scott Speed	Toro Rosso-Cosworth	MI	55	+1 lap	11	
15^{1}	19	(Netherlands) Christijan Albers	Spyker MF1-Toyota	B	53	+3 laps	22	
16	23	(Japan) Sakon Yamamoto	Super Aguri-Honda	B	52	+4 laps	19	
Ret	7	(Germany) Ralf Schumacher	Toyota	B	49	Oil pressure	16	
Ret	6	(Brazil) Felipe Massa	Ferrari	B	44	Collision	20	
Ret	8	(Italy) Jarno Trulli	Toyota	B	38	Engine	17	
Ret	18	(Portugal) Tiago Monteiro	Spyker MF1-Toyota	B	37	Spin	18	
Ret	3	(Finland) Kimi Räikkönen	McLaren-Mercedes	MI	18	Throttle	5	
DSQ	22	(Japan) Takuma Sato	Super Aguri-Honda	B	55	Ignored blue flags^{2}	21	

Notes

- ^1 – Christijan Albers received a 25-second time penalty for ignoring blue flags.
- ^2 – Takuma Sato originally finished 14th, but was disqualified for ignoring blue flags.

== Championship standings after the race ==
Drivers' Championship standings

	Pos.	Driver	Points
1	1	(Germany) Michael Schumacher*	116
1	2	(Spain) Fernando Alonso*	116
1	3	(Italy) Giancarlo Fisichella	63
1	4	(Brazil) Felipe Massa	62
	5	(Finland) Kimi Räikkönen	57

Constructors' Championship standings

	Pos.	Constructor	Points
1	1	(France) Renault*	179
1	2	(Italy) Ferrari*	178
	3	(United Kingdom) McLaren-Mercedes	101
	4	(Japan) Honda	73
	5	(Germany) BMW Sauber	35

- Note: Only the top five positions are included for both sets of standings.
- Bold text and an asterisk indicates competitors who still had a theoretical chance of becoming World Champion.

Previous race: 2006 Italian Grand Prix	FIA Formula One World Championship; 2006 season	Next race: 2006 Japanese Grand Prix
Previous race: 2005 Chinese Grand Prix	Chinese Grand Prix	Next race: 2007 Chinese Grand Prix
