= 2006 Italian Grand Prix =

Coordinates: 45°36′56″N 9°16′52″E

Race 15 of 18 in the 2006 Formula One World Championship
← Previous race	Next race →
- The Monza circuit after modified in 2000

Race details
- Date: 10 September 2006
- Official name: Formula 1 Gran Premio Vodafone d'Italia 2006
- Location: Autodromo Nazionale di Monza, Monza, Italy
- Course: Permanent racing facility
- Course length: 5.793 km (3.6 miles)
- Distance: 53 laps, 307.029 km (190.8 miles)
- Weather: Warm and sunny with temperatures reaching up to 27 °C (81 °F)

Pole position
Driver	(Finland) Kimi Räikkönen	McLaren-Mercedes
- Time: 1.21.484

Fastest lap
Driver	(Finland) Kimi Räikkönen	McLaren-Mercedes
- Time: 1:22.559 on lap 13

Podium
First	(Germany) Michael Schumacher	Ferrari
Second	(Finland) Kimi Räikkönen	McLaren-Mercedes
Third	(Poland) Robert Kubica	BMW Sauber

The 2006 Italian Grand Prix (officially the Formula 1 Gran Premio Vodafone d'Italia 2006) was a Formula One motor race held on 10 September 2006 at Autodromo Nazionale di Monza. It was the fifteenth race of the 2006 Formula One season, and was won by Michael Schumacher driving a Ferrari car.

Immediately following the race, Schumacher announced that he would retire from motor racing at the end of the 2006 season. Robert Kubica achieved his first career podium finish, in only his third Grand Prix. It was also only the second Grand Prix meeting appearance of Kubica's Friday driver successor, Sebastian Vettel. Vettel had impressed at the Turkish Grand Prix by setting the fastest time in one session, but he set the fastest time in both Friday practice sessions at this Grand Prix. The race was also the first race to see the introduction of a new High Speed Barrier developed by the FIA Institute and the FIA. The system, which was installed at the end of the run-off areas at the circuit's second chicane and Parabolica corners, was designed for use at corners with high speed approaches and limited run-off areas. Also this was the last race of the Red Bull driver Christian Klien, until his return to a race seat at the 2010 Singapore Grand Prix.

After the race, in the press conference, Schumacher announced his retirement from Formula One. On the same day, it was announced that Ferrari would replace Schumacher with Kimi Räikkönen. The race was his 90th victory. Four years later however in 2010, Schumacher returned to F1 with Mercedes.

== Friday drivers ==
The bottom 6 teams in the 2005 Constructors' Championship and Super Aguri were entitled to run a third car in free practice on Friday. These drivers drove on Friday but did not compete in qualifying or the race.

Constructor	Nat	Driver
Williams-Cosworth	(Austria)	Alexander Wurz
Honda	(United Kingdom)	Anthony Davidson
Red Bull-Ferrari	(Netherlands)	Robert Doornbos
BMW Sauber	(Germany)	Sebastian Vettel
MF1-Toyota	(Switzerland)	Giorgio Mondini
Toro Rosso-Cosworth	(Switzerland)	Neel Jani
Super Aguri-Honda	(France)	Franck Montagny

== Race report ==
At the start Kimi Räikkönen got away in the lead with Michael Schumacher and Nick Heidfeld tussling over 2nd. By lap 2 Fernando Alonso was up to 6th past Heidfeld as Schumacher and Räikkönen begin to pull clear of the rest. On lap 10 Nico Rosberg lost power in his Williams and was the first retirement, his 4th consecutive retirement. On lap 15 Räikkönen pitted from the lead and two laps later Schumacher came in and jumped him, Robert Kubica took the lead stopping much later, on lap 23, which allowed Schumacher into the lead for the first time in the race. On lap 44 there was drama when Alonso pulled over with a smoky Renault after an engine failure, this caused a problem for Massa who locked up behind him and went off before pitting to change tyres. Michael Schumacher cruised to victory ahead of Räikkönen, with Kubica claiming his first podium in 3rd place.

== Classification ==
=== Qualifying ===
Pos.	No.	Driver	Constructor	Q1	Q2	Q3	Grid
1	3	(Finland) Kimi Räikkönen	McLaren-Mercedes	1:21.994	1:21.349	1:21.484	1
2	5	(Germany) Michael Schumacher	Ferrari	1:21.711	1:21.353	1:21.486	2
3	16	(Germany) Nick Heidfeld	BMW Sauber	1:21.764	1:21.425	1:21.653	3
4	6	(Brazil) Felipe Massa	Ferrari	1:22.028	1:21.225	1:21.704	4
5	12	(United Kingdom) Jenson Button	Honda	1:22.512	1:21.572	1:22.011	5
6	17	(Poland) Robert Kubica	BMW Sauber	1:22.437	1:21.270	1:22.258	6
7	4	(Spain) Pedro de la Rosa	McLaren-Mercedes	1:22.422	1:21.878	1:22.280	7
8	11	(Brazil) Rubens Barrichello	Honda	1:22.640	1:21.688	1:22.787	8
9	2	(Italy) Giancarlo Fisichella	Renault	1:22.486	1:21.722	1:23.175	9
10	1	(Spain) Fernando Alonso	Renault	1:21.747	1:21.526	1:25.688	10^{2}
11	8	(Italy) Jarno Trulli	Toyota	1:22.093	1:21.924		11
12	10	(Germany) Nico Rosberg	Williams-Cosworth	1:22.581	1:22.203		12
13	7	(Germany) Ralf Schumacher	Toyota	1:22.622	1:22.280		13
14	14	(United Kingdom) David Coulthard	Red Bull-Ferrari	1:22.618	1:22.589		14
15	21	(United States) Scott Speed	Toro Rosso-Cosworth	1:22.943	1:23.165		15
16	15	(Austria) Christian Klien	Red Bull-Ferrari	1:22.898	No time^{1}		16
17	20	(Italy) Vitantonio Liuzzi	Toro Rosso-Cosworth	1:23.043			17
18	19	(Netherlands) Christijan Albers	MF1-Toyota	1:23.116			18
19	9	(Australia) Mark Webber	Williams-Cosworth	1:23.341			19
20	18	(Portugal) Tiago Monteiro	MF1-Toyota	1:23.920			20
21	22	(Japan) Takuma Sato	Super Aguri-Honda	1:24.289			21
22	23	(Japan) Sakon Yamamoto	Super Aguri-Honda	1:26.001			22

Notes

- ^1 – Christian Klien spun in the fifth corner and shut down his engine in Q1 and therefore did not set a time in Q2.
- ^2 – Fernando Alonso originally qualified with a time of 1:21.829 in Q3, but had his three fastest Q3 times deleted, effectively demoting him from fifth to tenth, after Monza stewards controversially penalized him, judging he had impeded Ferrari's Felipe Massa during qualifying.

=== Race ===
Pos.	No.	Driver	Constructor	Tyre	Laps	Time/Retired	Grid	Points
1	5	(Germany) Michael Schumacher	Ferrari	B	53	1:14:51.975	2	10
2	3	(Finland) Kimi Räikkönen	McLaren-Mercedes	MI	53	+8.046	1	8
3	17	(Poland) Robert Kubica	BMW Sauber	MI	53	+26.414	6	6
4	2	(Italy) Giancarlo Fisichella	Renault	MI	53	+32.045	9	5
5	12	(United Kingdom) Jenson Button	Honda	MI	53	+32.685	5	4
6	11	(Brazil) Rubens Barrichello	Honda	MI	53	+42.409	8	3
7	8	(Italy) Jarno Trulli	Toyota	B	53	+44.662	11	2
8	16	(Germany) Nick Heidfeld	BMW Sauber	MI	53	+45.309	3	1
9	6	(Brazil) Felipe Massa	Ferrari	B	53	+45.995	4	
10	9	(Australia) Mark Webber	Williams-Cosworth	B	53	+72.602	19	
11	15	(Austria) Christian Klien	Red Bull-Ferrari	MI	52	+1 lap	16	
12	14	(United Kingdom) David Coulthard	Red Bull-Ferrari	MI	52	+1 lap	14	
13	21	(United States) Scott Speed	Toro Rosso-Cosworth	MI	52	+1 lap	15	
14	20	(Italy) Vitantonio Liuzzi	Toro Rosso-Cosworth	MI	52	+1 lap	17	
15	7	(Germany) Ralf Schumacher	Toyota	B	52	+1 lap	13	
16	22	(Japan) Takuma Sato	Super Aguri-Honda	B	51	+2 laps	PL^{3}	
17	19	(Netherlands) Christijan Albers	MF1-Toyota	B	51	+2 laps	18	
Ret	18	(Portugal) Tiago Monteiro	MF1-Toyota	B	44	Brakes	20	
Ret	1	(Spain) Fernando Alonso	Renault	MI	43	Engine	10	
Ret	4	(Spain) Pedro de la Rosa	McLaren-Mercedes	MI	20	Engine	7	
Ret	23	(Japan) Sakon Yamamoto	Super Aguri-Honda	B	18	Hydraulics	22	
Ret	10	(Germany) Nico Rosberg	Williams-Cosworth	B	9	Driveshaft	12	

Notes

- ^3 – Takuma Sato started the race from the pitlane after having replaced his car with the spare one due to a hydraulic problem that occurred during the formation lap.

== Championship standings after the race ==
Drivers' Championship standings

Pos.	Driver	Points
1	(Spain) Fernando Alonso*	108
2	(Germany) Michael Schumacher*	106
3	(Brazil) Felipe Massa	62
4	(Italy) Giancarlo Fisichella	57
5	(Finland) Kimi Räikkönen	57

Constructors' Championship standings

	Pos.	Constructor	Points
1	1	(Italy) Ferrari*	168
1	2	(France) Renault*	165
	3	(United Kingdom) McLaren-Mercedes	97
	4	(Japan) Honda	65
1	5	(Germany) BMW Sauber	33

- Note: Only the top five positions are included for both sets of standings.
- Bold text and an asterisk indicates competitors who still had a theoretical chance of becoming World Champion.

== See also ==
- 2006 Monza GP2 Series round

Previous race: 2006 Turkish Grand Prix	FIA Formula One World Championship; 2006 season	Next race: 2006 Chinese Grand Prix
Previous race: 2005 Italian Grand Prix	Italian Grand Prix	Next race: 2007 Italian Grand Prix
