= 2006 Japanese Grand Prix =

Coordinates: 34°50′35″N 136°32′26″E

Race 17 of 18 in the 2006 Formula One World Championship
← Previous race	Next race →
- The Suzuka circuit

Race details
- Date: 8 October 2006
- Official name: 2006 Formula 1 Fuji Television Japanese Grand Prix
- Location: Suzuka Circuit, Suzuka, Mie, Japan
- Course: Permanent racing facility
- Course length: 5.807 km (3.608 miles)
- Distance: 53 laps, 307.573 km (191.117 miles)
- Weather: Fine
- Attendance: 361,000

Pole position
Driver	(Brazil) Felipe Massa	Ferrari
- Time: 1:29.599

Fastest lap
Driver	(Spain) Fernando Alonso	Renault
- Time: 1:32.676 on lap 14

Podium
First	(Spain) Fernando Alonso	Renault
Second	(Brazil) Felipe Massa	Ferrari
Third	(Italy) Giancarlo Fisichella	Renault

The 2006 Japanese Grand Prix (formally known as the 2006 Formula 1 Fuji Television Japanese Grand Prix) was a Formula One race held on 8 October 2006 at the Suzuka Circuit, in Suzuka, Japan. It was the seventeenth and penultimate round of the 2006 Formula One World Championship, and marked the 32nd running of the Japanese Grand Prix. It was won by Fernando Alonso, his last win for the Renault team before he moved to McLaren the following season.

It was the 20th Grand Prix to be held at Suzuka. It was the first Formula One race to be filmed and broadcast in high-definition television. However the Fuji Television broadcast was only available in Japan.

== Report ==
=== Practice and qualifying ===
==== Friday drivers ====
The bottom 6 teams in the 2005 Constructors' Championship and Super Aguri were entitled to run a third car in free practice on Friday. These drivers drove on Friday but did not compete in qualifying or the race.

Team	Nat	Driver
Williams-Cosworth	(Austria)	Alexander Wurz
Honda	(United Kingdom)	Anthony Davidson
Red Bull-Ferrari	(Germany)	Michael Ammermüller
BMW Sauber	(Germany)	Sebastian Vettel
Spyker MF1-Toyota	(Germany)	Adrian Sutil
Toro Rosso-Cosworth	(Switzerland)	Neel Jani
Super Aguri-Honda	(France)	Franck Montagny

=== Race ===
Felipe Massa started the race from pole, but Michael Schumacher passed him on lap 3 to take the lead. Meanwhile, Alonso was struggling to get past the Toyotas of Trulli and Ralf Schumacher. By lap 10 Alonso was 5.4 seconds off the leader. On lap 15 Alonso managed to pass Massa in the pitstops and chased Schumacher. He succeeded in closing the gap from 5.4 seconds on lap 10 to 4.2 seconds by lap 27 only for it to open up to 5.9 seconds by lap 34 after the two drivers encountered backmarkers. The race was crucial in the fight for the World Championship, as whoever finished ahead of the two would take the championship lead into the final race. On lap 37, after the two rivals had made their final pitstops, Schumacher's engine failed, his first engine failure since the 2000 French Grand Prix, giving the lead to Alonso, who went on to win the race. As a result, he needed only one point from the final race to secure the title.

As of 2025, Alonso's win remains the last victory for a car running on Michelin tyres, as the manufacturer pulled out of Formula One at the end of the season. Third place finisher Giancarlo Fisichella dedicated to his best friend, Tonino Visciani, who had died on 5 October 2006 after a heart attack.

== Classification ==
=== Qualifying ===
Pos.	No.	Driver	Constructor	Q1	Q2	Q3	Grid
1	6	(Brazil) Felipe Massa	Ferrari	1:30.112	1:29.830	1:29.599	1
2	5	(Germany) Michael Schumacher	Ferrari	1:31.279	1:28.954	1:29.711	2
3	7	(Germany) Ralf Schumacher	Toyota	1:30.595	1:30.299	1:29.989	3
4	8	(Italy) Jarno Trulli	Toyota	1:30.420	1:30.204	1:30.039	4
5	1	(Spain) Fernando Alonso	Renault	1:30.976	1:30.357	1:30.371	5
6	2	(Italy) Giancarlo Fisichella	Renault	1:31.696	1:30.306	1:30.599	6
7	12	(United Kingdom) Jenson Button	Honda	1:30.847	1:30.268	1:30.992	7
8	11	(Brazil) Rubens Barrichello	Honda	1:31.972	1:30.598	1:31.478	8
9	16	(Germany) Nick Heidfeld	BMW Sauber	1:31.811	1:30.470	1:31.513	9
10	10	(Germany) Nico Rosberg	Williams-Cosworth	1:30.585	1:30.321	1:31.856	10
11	3	(Finland) Kimi Räikkönen	McLaren-Mercedes	1:32.080	1:30.827		11
12	17	(Poland) Robert Kubica	BMW Sauber	1:31.204	1:31.094		12
13	4	(Spain) Pedro de la Rosa	McLaren-Mercedes	1:31.581	1:31.254		13
14	9	(Australia) Mark Webber	Williams-Cosworth	1:31.647	1:31.276		14
15	20	(Italy) Vitantonio Liuzzi	Toro Rosso-Cosworth	1:31.741	1:31.943		15
16	19	(Netherlands) Christijan Albers	Spyker MF1-Toyota	1:32.221	1:33.750		16
17	14	(United Kingdom) David Coulthard	Red Bull-Ferrari	1:32.252			17
18	15	(Netherlands) Robert Doornbos	Red Bull-Ferrari	1:32.402			18
19	21	(United States) Scott Speed	Toro Rosso-Cosworth	1:32.867			19
20	22	(Japan) Takuma Sato	Super Aguri-Honda	1:33.666			20
21	18	(Portugal) Tiago Monteiro	Spyker MF1-Toyota	1:33.709			21
22	23	(Japan) Sakon Yamamoto	Super Aguri-Honda	No time^{1}			22

Notes

- ^1 – Sakon Yamamoto did not get time in Q1 due to technical problems.

=== Race ===
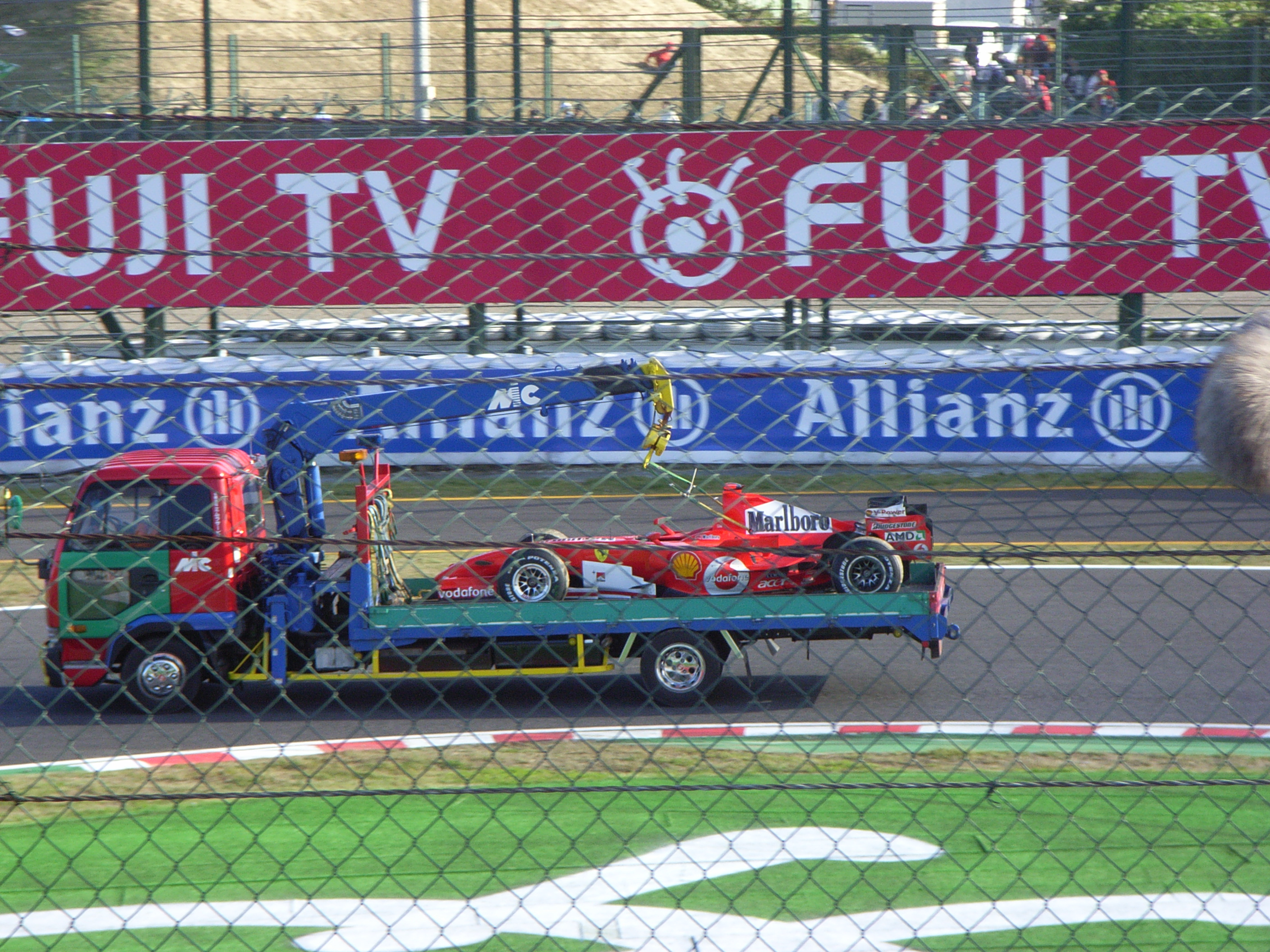
Michael Schumacher's Ferrari is returned to the pits after an engine failure cost him the race lead, and handed Fernando Alonso a ten-point advantage in the Drivers' Championship with one race remaining.

Pos.	No.	Driver	Constructor	Tyre	Lap	Time/Retired	Grid	Points
1	1	(Spain) Fernando Alonso	Renault	M	53	1:23:53.413	5	10
2	6	(Brazil) Felipe Massa	Ferrari	B	53	+16.151	1	8
3	2	(Italy) Giancarlo Fisichella	Renault	M	53	+23.953	6	6
4	12	(United Kingdom) Jenson Button	Honda	M	53	+34.101	7	5
5	3	(Finland) Kimi Räikkönen	McLaren-Mercedes	M	53	+43.596	11	4
6	8	(Italy) Jarno Trulli	Toyota	B	53	+46.717	4	3
7	7	(Germany) Ralf Schumacher	Toyota	B	53	+48.869	3	2
8	16	(Germany) Nick Heidfeld	BMW Sauber	M	53	+1:16.095	9	1
9	17	(Poland) Robert Kubica	BMW Sauber	M	53	+1:16.932	12	
10	10	(Germany) Nico Rosberg	Williams-Cosworth	B	52	+1 lap	10	
11	4	(Spain) Pedro de la Rosa	McLaren-Mercedes	M	52	+1 lap	13	
12	11	(Brazil) Rubens Barrichello	Honda	M	52	+1 lap	8	
13	15	(Netherlands) Robert Doornbos	Red Bull-Ferrari	M	52	+1 lap	18	
14	20	(Italy) Vitantonio Liuzzi	Toro Rosso-Cosworth	M	52	+1 lap	15	
15	22	(Japan) Takuma Sato	Super Aguri-Honda	B	52	+1 lap	20	
16	18	(Portugal) Tiago Monteiro	Spyker MF1-Toyota	B	51	+2 laps	21	
17	23	(Japan) Sakon Yamamoto	Super Aguri-Honda	B	50	+3 laps	22	
18	21	(United States) Scott Speed	Toro Rosso-Cosworth	M	48	Power steering	19	
Ret	9	(Australia) Mark Webber	Williams-Cosworth	B	39	Accident	14	
Ret	5	(Germany) Michael Schumacher	Ferrari	B	36	Engine	2	
Ret	14	(United Kingdom) David Coulthard	Red Bull-Ferrari	M	35	Gearbox	17	
Ret	19	(Netherlands) Christijan Albers	Spyker MF1-Toyota	B	20	Driveshaft	16	

== Championship standings after the race ==
Drivers' Championship standings

	Pos.	Driver	Points
1	1	(Spain) Fernando Alonso*	126
1	2	(Germany) Michael Schumacher*	116
1	3	(Brazil) Felipe Massa	70
1	4	(Italy) Giancarlo Fisichella	69
	5	(Finland) Kimi Räikkönen	61

Constructors' Championship standings

Pos.	Constructor	Points
1	(France) Renault*	195
2	(Italy) Ferrari*	186
3	(United Kingdom) McLaren-Mercedes	105
4	(Japan) Honda	78
5	(Germany) BMW Sauber	36

- Note: Only the top five positions are included for both sets of standings.
- Bold text and an asterisk indicates competitors who still had a theoretical chance of becoming World Champion.

Previous race: 2006 Chinese Grand Prix	FIA Formula One World Championship; 2006 season	Next race: 2006 Brazilian Grand Prix
Previous race: 2005 Japanese Grand Prix	Japanese Grand Prix	Next race: 2007 Japanese Grand Prix
