= Minardi PS04 =

Formula One racing car

- Category: Formula One
- Constructor: Minardi

Technical specifications
- Tyres: Bridgestone

Competition history
- Notable entrants: Minardi
Races	Wins	Poles	F/Laps
0	0	0	0

The Minardi PS04 was a Formula One racing car of the Italian racing team Minardi, which was developed in autumn 2003, but was not used in any Formula One race in this form. Instead, the team contested the 2004 season with the Minardi PS04B, which was a completely separate construction and had no relation to the PS04.

== History ==
The PS04 was not technically related to the Minardi PS01, PS02 and PS03 models developed and used between 2001 and 2003. Rather, it was largely identical to the Arrows A23 that the British Formula 1 team Arrows, which had since been dissolved, used in the 2002 Formula One World Championship for Heinz-Harald Frentzen and Enrique Bernoldi.

After the insolvency proceedings against Arrows had been opened, the team's equipment was publicly auctioned off in early summer 2003. Paul Stoddart, the owner of the Minardi team, acquired five Arrows A23 vehicles in addition to some pieces of equipment. Initially, Stoddart aimed to have the cars examined by Minardi's design department to gain insights that could improve future models.

In September 2003, however, several comparative tests were carried out between the Arrows and the current Minardi PS03. Minardi's mechanics completed an Arrows chassis for this purpose using Minardi's electronics, their own suspension parts and a few other components. This vehicle received the designation Minardi PS04.

A first test was carried out in Mugello by Minardi's regular driver Nicolas Kiesa. Although the test team had no experience with the Arrows chassis, the PS04 painted in Minardi colors was no slower than Minardi's own identically motorized PS03. In particular, Kiesa praised the significantly better downforce of the PS04. Two weeks later, Minardi's second driver, Jos Verstappen, conducted another test. The Dutchman, who deeply hated the PS03, was also positive about the Arrows construction.

At the end of 2003, Minardi was considering contesting the 2004 season with the PS04. Ultimately, however, Paul Stoddart decided against using this model. Most sources state that the reason for this is that the Arrows chassis did not harmonize well with the Bridgestone tires. In addition, some regulatory changes would have had to be made to the A23. Instead, in 2004 Minardi again used their own construction, which was given the name Minardi PS04B. Apart from a few aerodynamic detail solutions, the PS04B had nothing in common with the PS04. Rather, it was a further development of the Minardi PS03, the basic features of which go back to 2001.

Paul Stoddart sold the Arrows chassis to Aguri Suzuki in the winter of 2005/2006, who used it to develop the first models of his new Formula 1 team, Super Aguri. The cars competed temporarily in the 2006 Formula One World Championship as the Super Aguri SA05. The SA06, presented a little later, also still used the chassis of the Arrows A23.

== Sources ==
This article incorporates material derived from the "Minardi PS04" article on the Formula 1 Wiki at Fandom (formerly Wikia) and is licensed under the Creative Commons Attribution-Share Alike 3.0 License (2023-12-07).
