= Super Aguri SA07 =

Formula One racing car

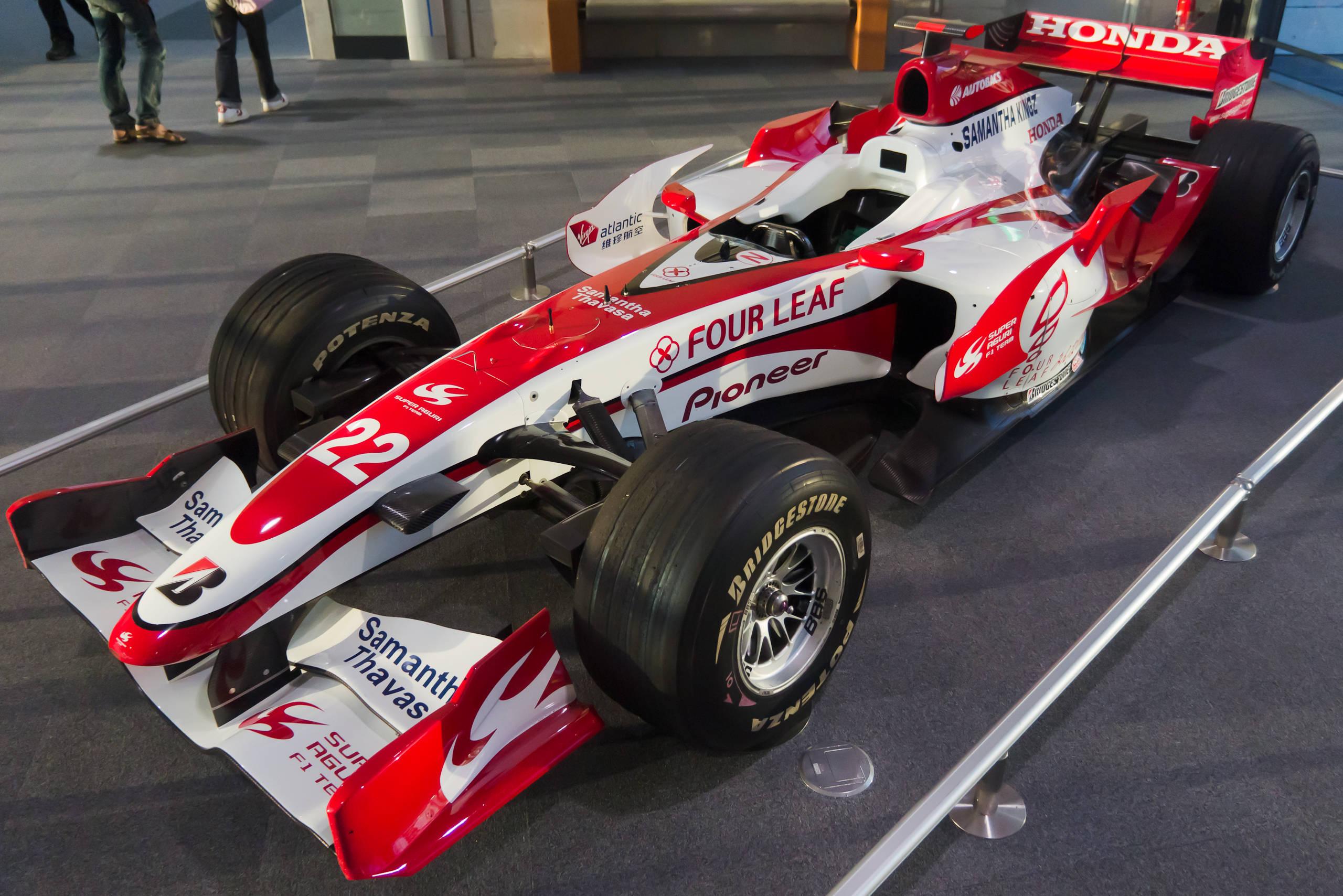
- The SA07 of Takuma Sato on display at the Honda Collection Hall
- Category: Formula One
- Constructor: Super Aguri
- Designers: Mark Preston (Technical director); Peter McCool (Chief Designer); Stephen Watt (Head of Electronics); Ben Wood (Head of Aerodynamics)
- Predecessor: SA06
- Successor: SA08

Technical specifications
- Chassis: Moulded carbon fibre and honeycomb composite incorporating front and side impact structures with integral roll protection structures
- Suspension (front): Wishbones, pushrod operated torsion bars and dampers. Mechanical anti-roll bar
- Suspension (rear): as front
- Length: 4,680 mm (184 in)
- Width: 1,800 mm (71 in)
- Height: 950 mm (37 in)
- Wheelbase: 3,135 mm (123 in)
- Engine: Honda RA807E 2.4 L (150 cu in) V8 (90°). Naturally-aspirated, 19,000 RPM limited, mid-mounted.
- Transmission: Super Aguri 7 forward speeds + 1 reverse semi-automatic
- Lubricants: ENEOS
- Brakes: 6 piston calipers with carbon pads and disks
- Tyres: Bridgestone
- Clutch: Sachs

Competition history
- Notable entrants: Super Aguri F1 Team
- Notable drivers: 22. (Japan) Takuma Sato; 23. (United Kingdom) Anthony Davidson
- Debut: 2007 Australian Grand Prix
- Last event: 2007 Brazilian Grand Prix
Races	Wins	Poles	F/Laps
17	0	0	0
- Constructors' Championships: 0
- Drivers' Championships: 0

The Super Aguri SA07 was Super Aguri F1's Formula One car for the 2007 Formula One season. It was designed by Peter McCool and was driven by Takuma Sato and Anthony Davidson.

== Customer car protests ==
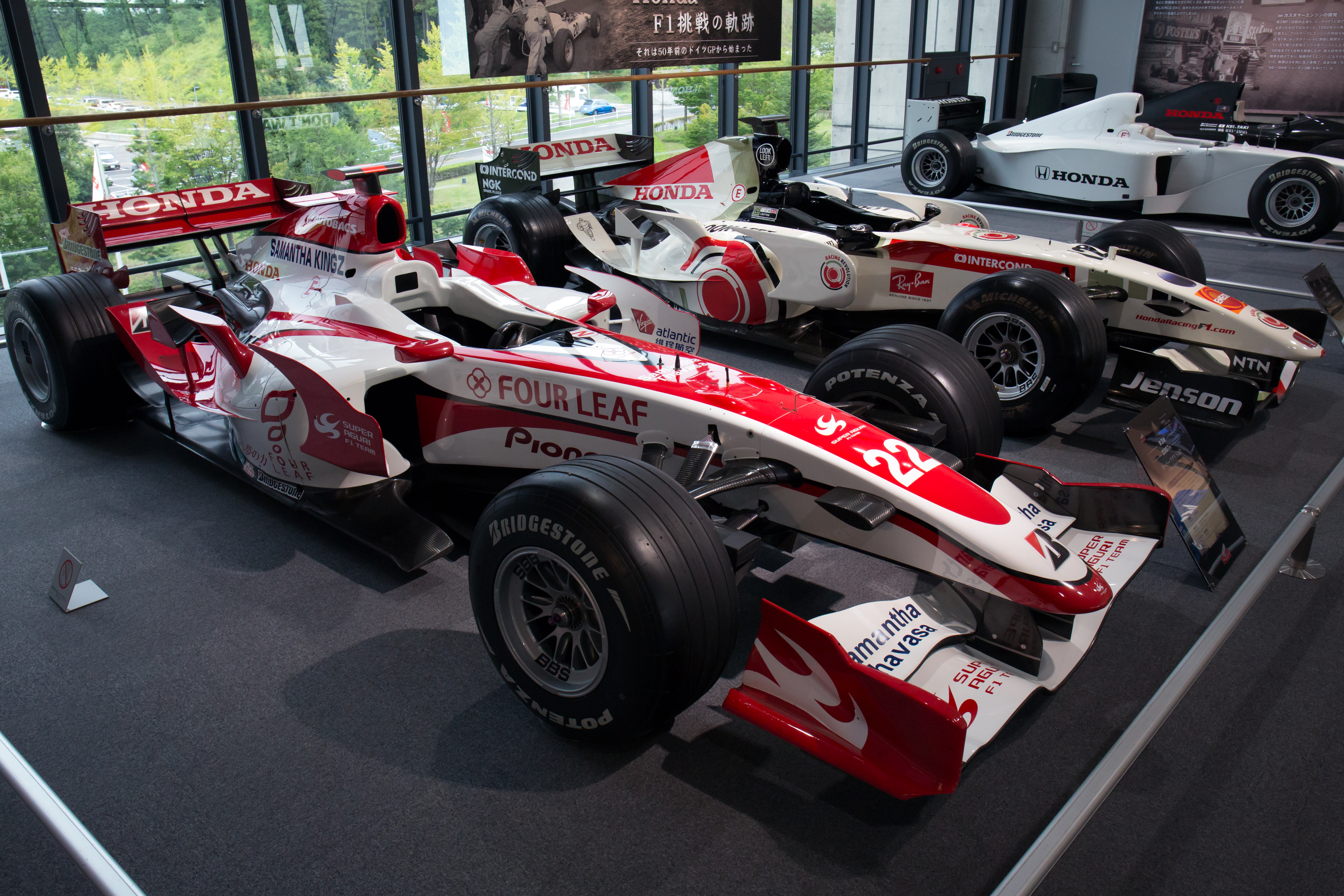
The SA07 and the Honda RA106.

The 2007 Super Aguri was based on a re-worked RA106 chassis used by Honda F1 in the 2006 Formula One season. It was the basis of a complaint filed by Spyker F1 against Super Aguri F1. It is believed that the protest is related to articles 2.1, 2.2 and 6.3 of the F1 sporting regulations. Article 6.3 of the F1 sporting regulations states: "The constructor of an engine or rolling chassis is the person (including any corporate or unincorporated body) which owns the intellectual property rights to such engine or chassis." Since Super Aguri owned the intellectual property rights, they claimed that the car was within the rules. Indeed, the Honda F1 RA106 was sold to PJUU Inc, and Super Aguri F1 acquired the rights through them and thereafter modified the package to meet the technical regulations for the 2007 season.

There was also another issue of the team's possible violation of the Concorde Agreement. Both Spyker and Williams claimed that Super Aguri (and both Red Bull teams) had broken Schedule 3 of the Agreement which states: "A constructor is a person (including any incorporated or unincorporated body) who owns the intellectual property rights to the rolling chassis it currently races, and does not incorporate in such chassis any part designed or manufactured by any other constructor of F1 racing cars except for standard items of safety equipment, providing that nothing in the Schedule 3 shall prevent the use of an engine or gearbox manufactured by a person other than the constructor of the chassis." Spyker and Williams believed that if the SA07 did indeed use components designed by Honda, they would be in violation of the Concorde Agreement. As of July 2007, the issue had yet to be clarified and the FIA is not permitted to take action against a team curtailing the Concorde Agreement until the issue has been resolved in a court of law. Super Aguri maintained their innocence in this issue, though the matter was still of great contention.

== Race history ==
The car performed extremely well compared to its predecessor the SA06. In qualifying for the Australian Grand Prix, both drivers comfortably made it through the first knockout stage - a first for the team - and Takuma Sato managed to get through to the final ten. In race pace, the car performed less favourably, but still catapulted Super Aguri off the back row of the grid. In Spain they scored their first ever point after Takuma Sato finished in eighth but only after Nick Heidfeld fell to the wayside due to a pit stop error and a high attrition rate. Two races later, in Canada, Sato scored another three points in an incident-filled Grand Prix, overtaking World Champion Fernando Alonso in the process, while Davidson ran strongly, on a one-stopper, in 3rd place, before he hit a groundhog, which forced him to stop and drop out of the points. The car had frequently been more competitive than parent team Honda's RA107, although the factory Honda team finished ahead in the Constructors' Championship with 6 points, compared to Super Aguri's 4.

== Super Aguri SA07B ==
During winter testing for the 2008 season, Super Aguri used a B version of the SA07, which had been brought into compliance with the 2008 technical regulations. The SA07B was driven by the team's two incumbent drivers, Sato and Davidson.

== Gallery ==
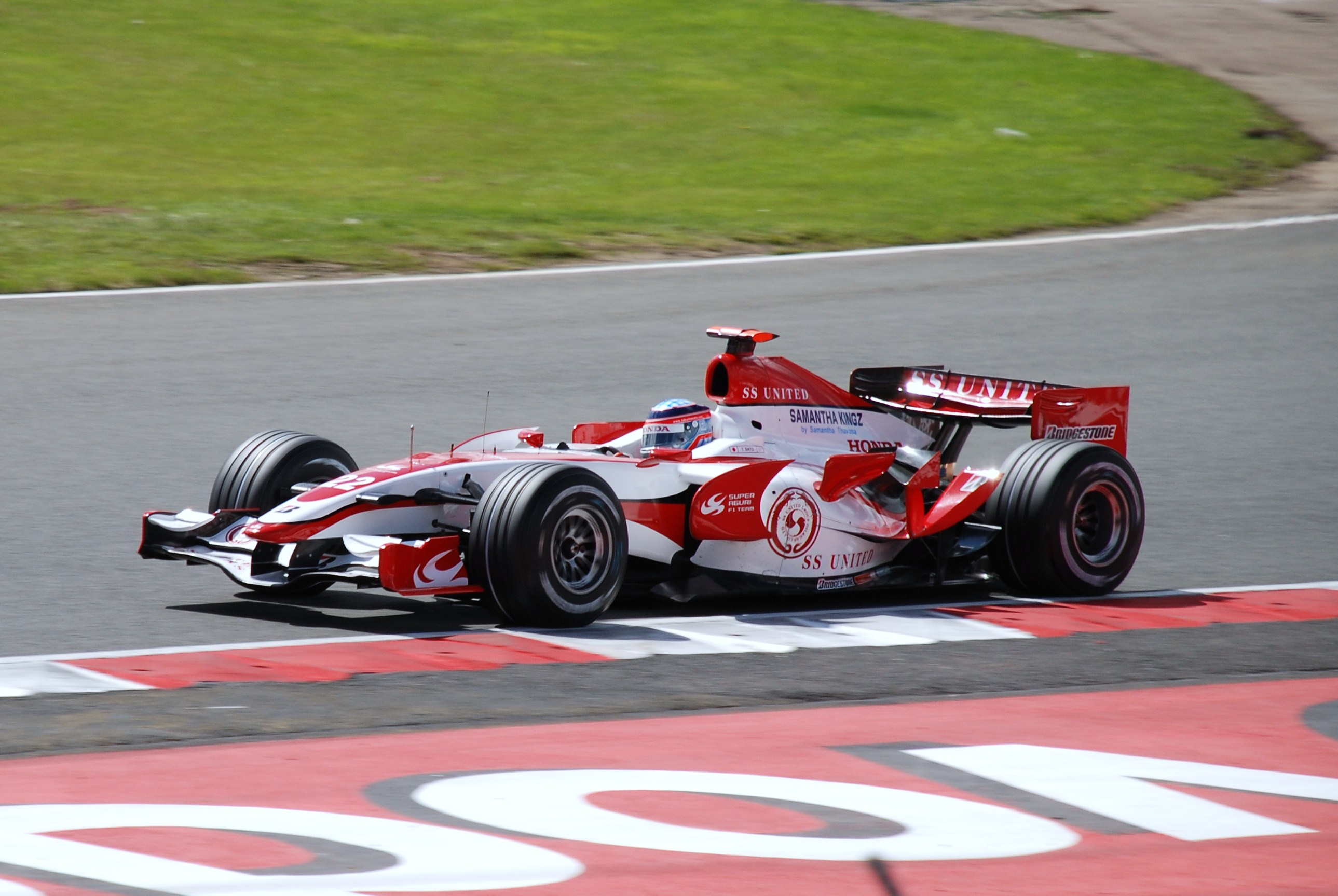
Takuma Sato driving the SA07 at the 2007 British Grand Prix.

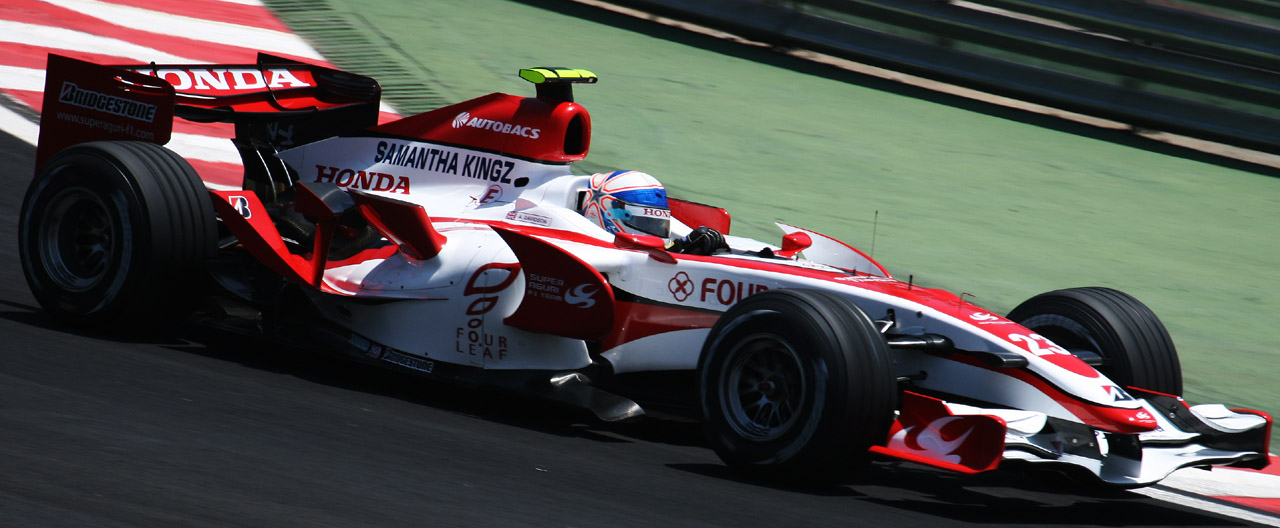
Anthony Davidson driving the SA07 at the 2007 Brazilian Grand Prix.

== Complete Formula One results ==
(key) (results in bold indicate pole position)

Year	Team	Engine	Tyres	Drivers	1	2	3	4	5	6	7	8	9	10	11	12	13	14	15	16	17	Points	WCC
2007	Super Aguri	Honda V8	**B**		AUS	MAL	BHR	ESP	MON	CAN	USA	FRA	GBR	EUR	HUN	TUR	ITA	BEL	JPN	CHN	BRA	**4**	**9th**
2007	Super Aguri	Honda V8	**B**	(Japan) Takuma Sato	12	13	Ret	8	17	6	Ret	16	14	Ret	15	18	16	15	15^{†}	14	12	**4**	**9th**
2007	Super Aguri	Honda V8	**B**	(United Kingdom) Anthony Davidson	16	16	16^{†}	11	18	11	11	Ret	Ret	12	Ret	14	14	16	Ret	Ret	14	**4**	**9th**
