= Super Aguri SA05 =

Formula One racing car

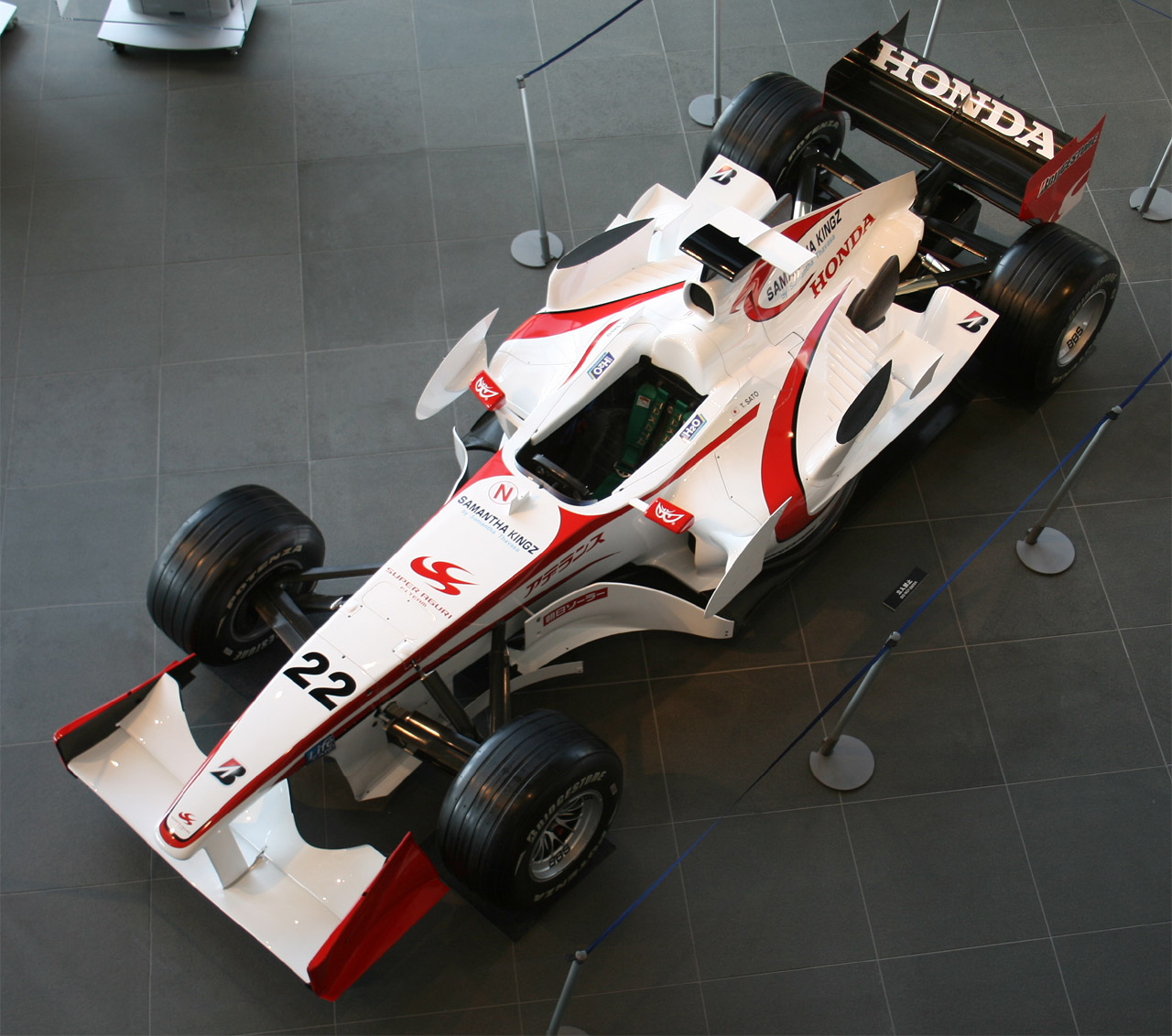
- The SA05 of Takuma Sato
- Category: Formula One
- Constructor: Super Aguri
- Designers: Mike Coughlan (Technical Director); Mark Preston (Engineering director); Sergio Rinland (Chief Designer)
- Predecessor: Arrows A23, Minardi PS04, Minardi PS04B
- Successor: SA06

Technical specifications
- Chassis: Carbon-fibre monocoque with honeycomb structure
- Suspension (front): Wishbones, pushrod-operated torsion bars and dampers. Mechanical anti-roll bar
- Suspension (rear): Wishbones, pushrod-operated torsion bars and dampers. Mechanical anti-roll bar
- Length: 4,666 mm (184 in)
- Width: 1,800 mm (71 in)
- Height: 950 mm (37 in)
- Axle track: Front: 1,472 mm (58 in); Rear: 1,422 mm (56 in)
- Wheelbase: 3,100 mm (122 in)
- Engine: Honda RA806-E 2.4 L (146 cu in) V8 naturally aspirated, 19000 rpm limited mid-mounted
- Transmission: SAF1 carbon composite material main case 7-speed semi-automatic paddle shift
- Power: 650–750 hp (485–559 kW) @ 19,500 rpm
- Weight: 600 kg (1,323 lb) including driver
- Fuel: Elf
- Lubricants: ENEOS
- Tyres: Bridgestone

Competition history
- Notable entrants: Super Aguri F1 Team
- Notable drivers: 22. (Japan) Takuma Sato; 23. (Japan) Yuji Ide; 23. (France) Franck Montagny
- Debut: 2006 Bahrain Grand Prix
- Last event: 2006 French Grand Prix
Races	Wins	Poles	F/Laps
11	0	0	0
- Constructors' Championships: 0
- Drivers' Championships: 0

The Super Aguri SA05 was the car with which the Super Aguri team competed in the first half of the 2006 Formula One season. It originally was developed from the Arrows A23 designed in 2002 by Mike Coughlan and Sergio Rinland. The project was overseen by former Arrows engineer Mark Preston, who brought several other ex Arrows employees back with him.

This was the first non-Brackley Honda-powered Formula One car since the Jordan EJ12 in 2002.

== Background ==
=== Development ===
The decision to use the A23 as the base chassis for the team's debut car was in part because the team was disallowed from using BAR's 2005 F1 car (BAR being Honda's predecessor team).

From the A23, the car used a new monocoque, new aerodynamic package and rear end engine parts. The original A23 used a V10 Cosworth engine, and thanks to the new engine regulations for 2006, the engine installation had to be redesigned to accept the smaller Honda V8.

=== Drivers ===
The SA05 was driven by Takuma Sato, whose firing by the works Honda team had played a significant role in creating the team, and also was driven by inexperienced Japanese rookie Yuji Ide and long-term Renault test driver Franck Montagny.

=== Issues ===
The team was created at short notice, partly due to Honda's unwillingness to leave the popular Sato without an F1 drive. The team, led by former F1 driver Aguri Suzuki, was funded by Honda and used Honda engines. The chassis, however, was based on the Arrows A23 from 2002, which the team purchased from Paul Stoddart, who had in turn bought these cars after the Arrows team collapsed and used them for developing a new Minardi known as the "PS04". The gearbox was also from Arrows, as was the suspension design, which was unchanged from 2002.

== Season overview ==
The year was one of exploration and learning for the team. The car was predictably the slowest during pre-season testing, but a new aerodynamic package was introduced before the first race in Bahrain which brought the team closer to the others. Although the car was on average the slowest, it was not by a big margin, and Sato impressed by racing with faster cars. Ide, however, was out of his depth, and his Super Licence was taken away in part after a spectacular collision with Christijan Albers' Midland at the 2006 San Marino Grand Prix. He was subsequently replaced by Montagny, who was much closer to Sato's pace.

The team's increase in personnel and support from Honda allowed them to prepare the SA06, which was used from the German GP onwards. At that stage of the season, the team were 11th in the Constructors' Championship, with no points.

== Gallery ==
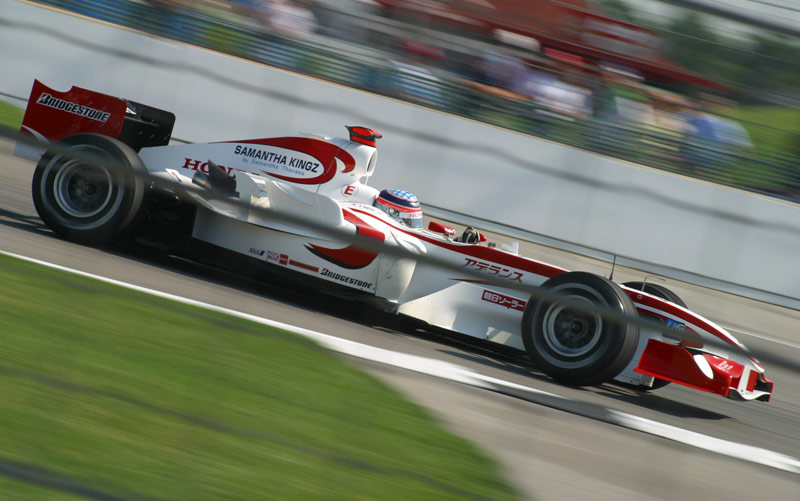
Takuma Sato at the 2006 United States Grand Prix.

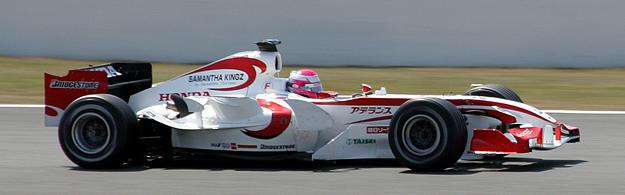
Franck Montagny at the 2006 French Grand Prix.

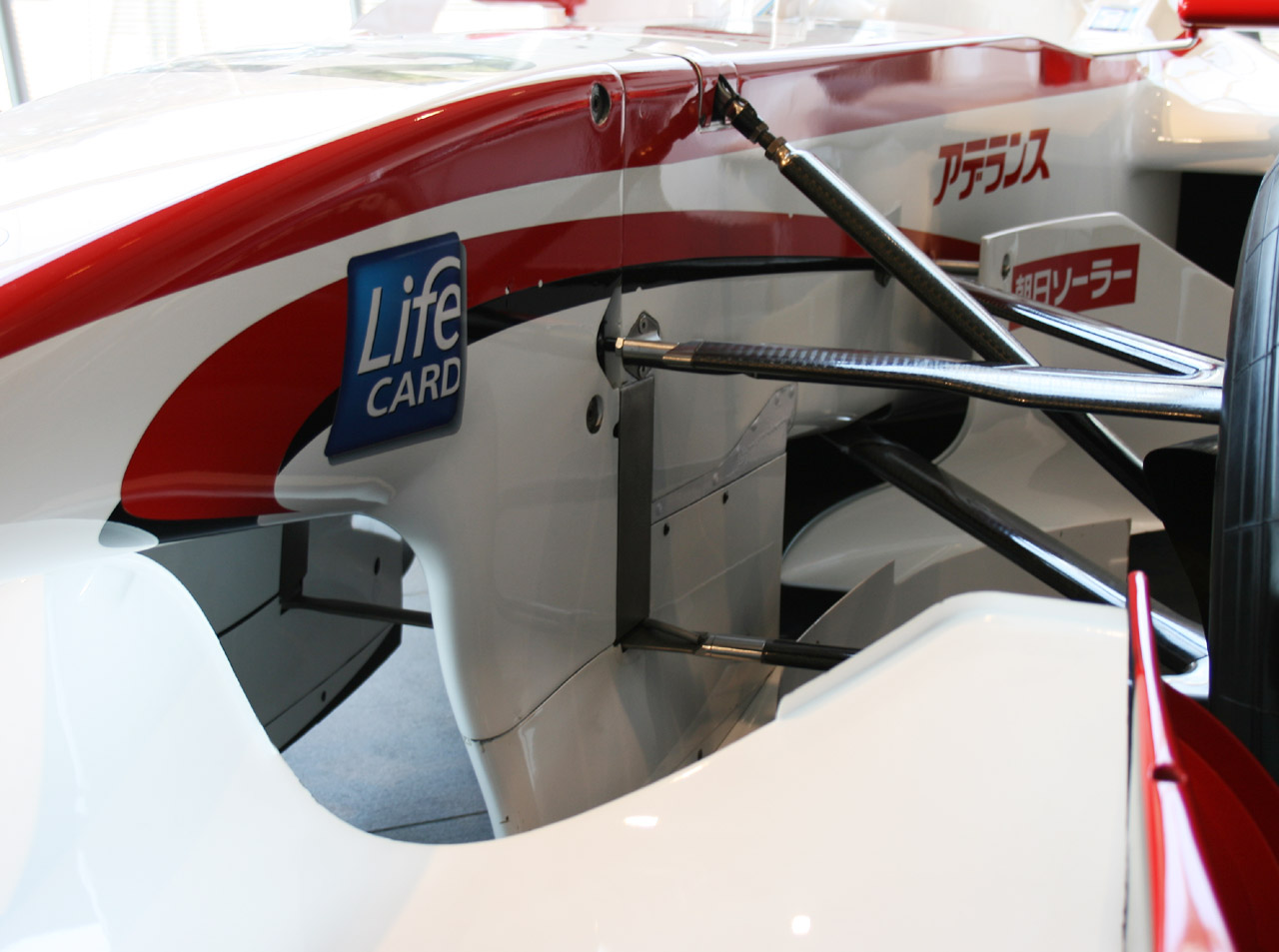
The front suspension mount of the SA05; it was used without changing the feature of the Arrows A23. This part was modified in its development, SA06.

== Complete Formula One results ==
(key) (results in bold indicate pole position)

Year	Team	Engine	Tyres	Drivers	1	2	3	4	5	6	7	8	9	10	11	12	13	14	15	16	17	18	Points	WCC
2006	Super Aguri	Honda V8	**B**		BHR	MAL	AUS	SMR	EUR	ESP	MON	GBR	CAN	USA	FRA	GER	HUN	TUR	ITA	CHN	JPN	BRA	0	NC
2006	Super Aguri	Honda V8	**B**	(Japan) Takuma Sato	18	14	12	Ret	Ret	17	Ret	17	15^{†}	Ret	Ret								0	NC
2006	Super Aguri	Honda V8	**B**	(Japan) Yuji Ide	Ret	Ret	13	Ret															0	NC
2006	Super Aguri	Honda V8	**B**	(France) Franck Montagny					Ret	Ret	16	18	Ret	Ret	16								0	NC
