= Super Aguri SA08 =

Formula One racing car

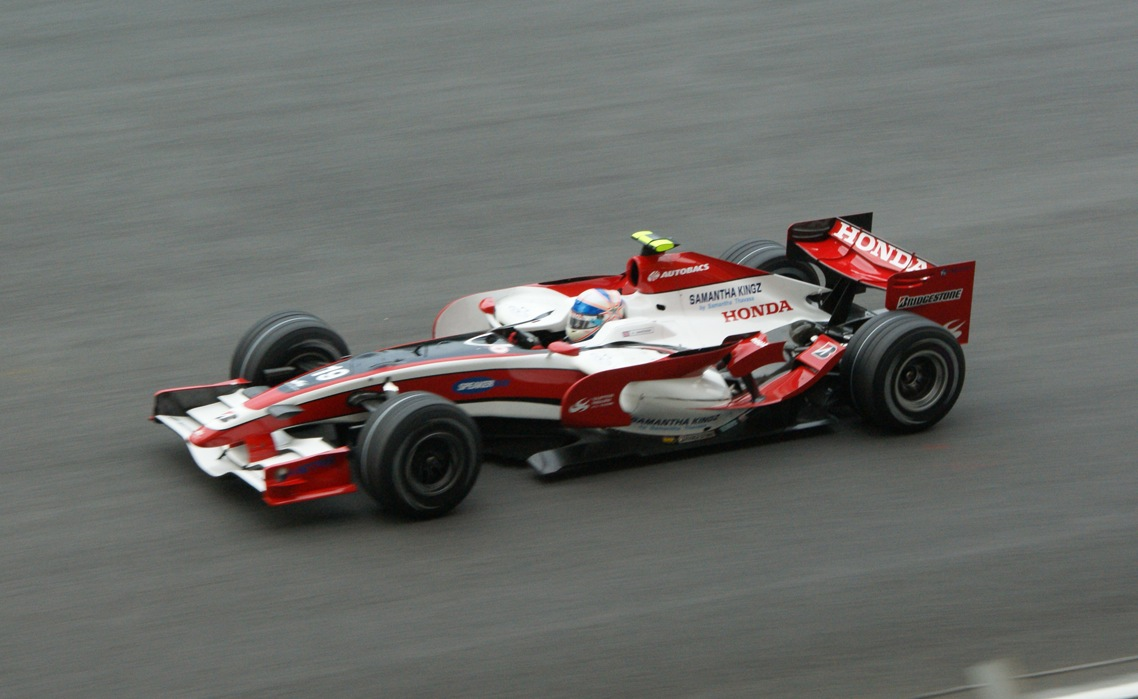
- Anthony Davidson driving the SA08 at the 2008 Malaysian Grand Prix
- Category: Formula One
- Constructor: Super Aguri F1
- Designers: Mark Preston (Technical director); Peter McCool (Chief Designer); Ben Wood (Head of Aerodynamics)
- Predecessor: SA07

Technical specifications
- Chassis: Moulded carbon fibre and honeycomb composite monocoque
- Suspension (front): Double wishbone with pushrod-activated torsion springs and rockers, Showa dampers
- Suspension (rear): As front
- Engine: Honda RA808E 2.4L 90° V8, naturally aspirated, mid-mounted
- Transmission: 7-speed sequential semi-automatic
- Fuel: BP
- Lubricants: Castrol
- Tyres: Bridgestone

Competition history
- Notable entrants: Super Aguri F1 Team
- Notable drivers: 18. (Japan) Takuma Sato; 19. (United Kingdom) Anthony Davidson
- Debut: 2008 Australian Grand Prix
- Last event: 2008 Spanish Grand Prix
Races	Wins	Podiums	Poles	F/Laps
4	0	0	0	0
- Constructors' Championships: 0
- Drivers' Championships: 0

The Super Aguri SA08 is a Formula One racing car with which Super Aguri F1 competed in the 2008 Formula One season.

== Overview ==
The SA08, similarly to the SA07, was a reworked design of the prior season's Honda F1 car - the RA107.

Pre season testing did not start well for the team. At the scheduled January test in Jerez, James Rossiter was limited to just 10 laps in three days of testing due to parts issues. The team fared better at the February test, with drivers Takuma Sato and Anthony Davidson completing consistent running of around 100 laps each per day.

However, as the team progressed toward the season financial difficulties became apparent. While the SA08 passed its mandatory FIA crash test, the launch was cancelled and the team did not attend the final pre-season test at Catalunya.

Ahead of the first Grand Prix, it was understood the Magma Group were to acquire Super Aguri, and at this stage Takuma Sato and Anthony Davidson were confirmed as the race drivers for the SA08. Later, James Rossiter would be appointed test driver.

At the first race in Australia, the team arrived with the SA08 and unveiled the car officially during Friday practice. It was finished in a red, white and black livery however was bereft of sponsors. Sato outqualified Renault driver Nelson Piquet Jr. In the race, both cars would retire. Davidson from a collision involving Jenson Button, Mark Webber and Sebastian Vettel whilst Sato suffered transmission failure on lap 32.

In Malaysia, Sato once again qualified 20th this time ahead of Adrian Sutil. Both SA08's were able to finish with Davidson in 15th and Sato in 16th. By Bahrain, the SA08 was off the pace, with Davidson qualifying 21st behind Sutil by nearly four tenths of a second. Sato crashed causing wing and suspension damage to his car, leaving him with a best time that was over four and a half seconds slower than the best time of qualifying.

The 2008 Spanish Grand Prix would be the SA08, and the Super Aguri team as a whole's final Grand Prix. Qualifying on the back row once again, Davidson was forced to retire on lap 21 and while Takuma Sato was the final classified car in 13th place.

Ahead of the next race in Turkey, the team's trucks were barred from accessing the circuit. The Magma Group takeover collapsed, and a later deal from the Weigl Group did not pass Honda's scrutiny. Therefore the SA08 would not race in Formula One again.

== Sponsorship and livery ==
The car featured a white base colour with large red areas extending from the nose to the sidepods and over the engine cover, accented with black borders. At the Spanish Grand Prix, the team used a white livery from which the red colour had been removed from the sides.

== Complete Formula One results ==
(key)

Year	Team	Engine	Tyres	Drivers	1	2	3	4	5	6	7	8	9	10	11	12	13	14	15	16	17	18	Points	WCC
2008	Super Aguri F1 Team	Honda V8	B		AUS	MAL	BHR	ESP	TUR	MON	CAN	FRA	GBR	GER	HUN	EUR	BEL	ITA	SIN	JPN	CHN	BRA	0	11th
2008	Super Aguri F1 Team	Honda V8	B	Sato	Ret	16	17	13	WD														0	11th
2008	Super Aguri F1 Team	Honda V8	B	Davidson	Ret	15	16	Ret	WD														0	11th
