= Super Aguri SA06 =

Formula One racing car

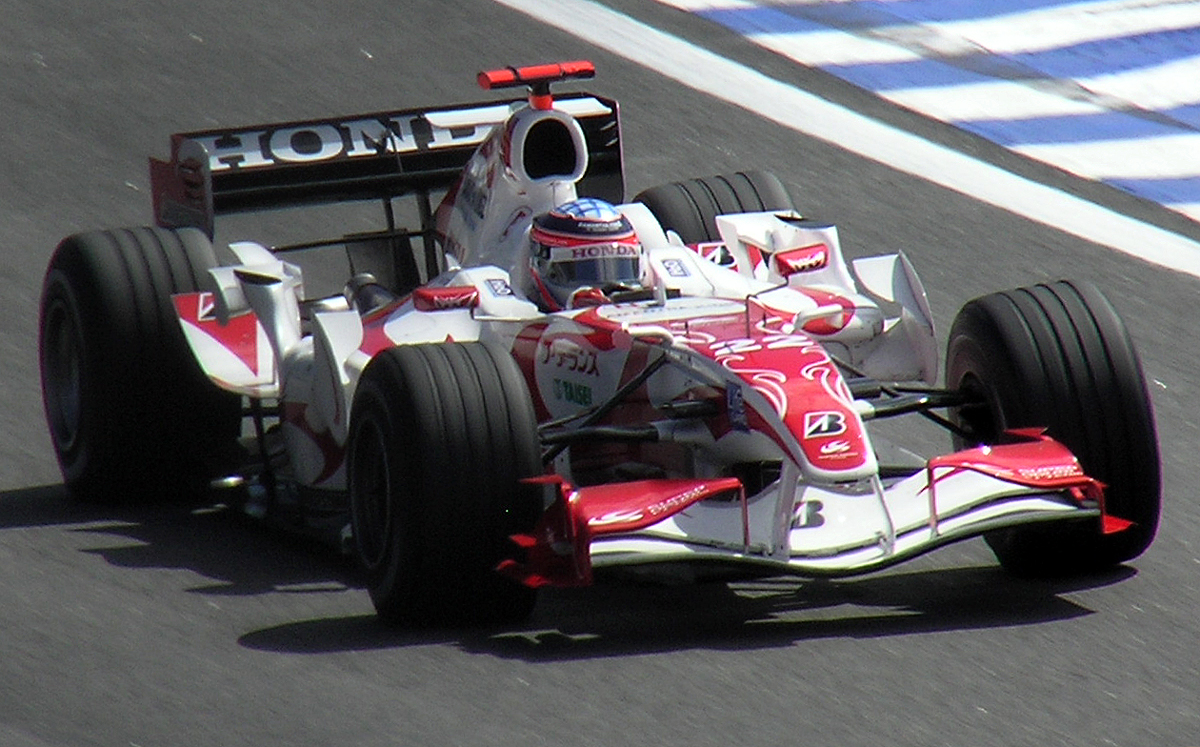
- Takuma Sato driving the SA06 at the 2006 Brazilian Grand Prix
- Category: Formula One
- Constructor: Super Aguri
- Designers: Mark Preston (Technical director); Peter McCool (Chief Designer); Stephen Watt (Head of Electronics); Ben Wood (Head of Aerodynamics)
- Predecessor: SA05
- Successor: SA07

Technical specifications
- Chassis: Moulded carbon fibre and honeycomb composite construction incorporating front and side composite impact structures. Integral roll protection structures. Fully enclosed fuel cell
- Suspension (front): Wishbones, pushrod operated torsion bars and dampers. Mechanical anti-roll bar
- Suspension (rear): Wishbones, pushrod operated coil springs and dampers. Mechanical anti-roll bar
- Length: 4,666 mm (184 in)
- Width: 1,800 mm (71 in)
- Height: 950 mm (37 in)
- Wheelbase: 3,100 mm (122 in)
- Engine: Honda RA806E 2.4 L (146 cu in) V8 (90°). Naturally-aspirated, mid-mounted.
- Transmission: Super Aguri 7 forward speeds + 1 reverse semi-automatic
- Weight: 600 kg (1,323 lb) (including driver and camera)
- Brakes: AP Racing calipers, Hitco material
- Tyres: Bridgestone; BBS wheels (front and rear)
- Clutch: Sachs

Competition history
- Notable entrants: Super Aguri F1 Team
- Notable drivers: 22. (Japan) Takuma Sato; 23. (Japan) Sakon Yamamoto
- Debut: 2006 German Grand Prix
- Last event: 2006 Brazilian Grand Prix
Races	Wins	Poles	F/Laps
7	0	0	0
- Constructors' Championships: 0
- Drivers' Championships: 0

The Super Aguri SA06 was the car with which the Super Aguri team competed in the latter part of the 2006 Formula One season. It was driven by Takuma Sato, who drove for the team throughout the year, and rookie compatriot Sakon Yamamoto, whose début at the German GP coincided with that of the new car.

== History ==
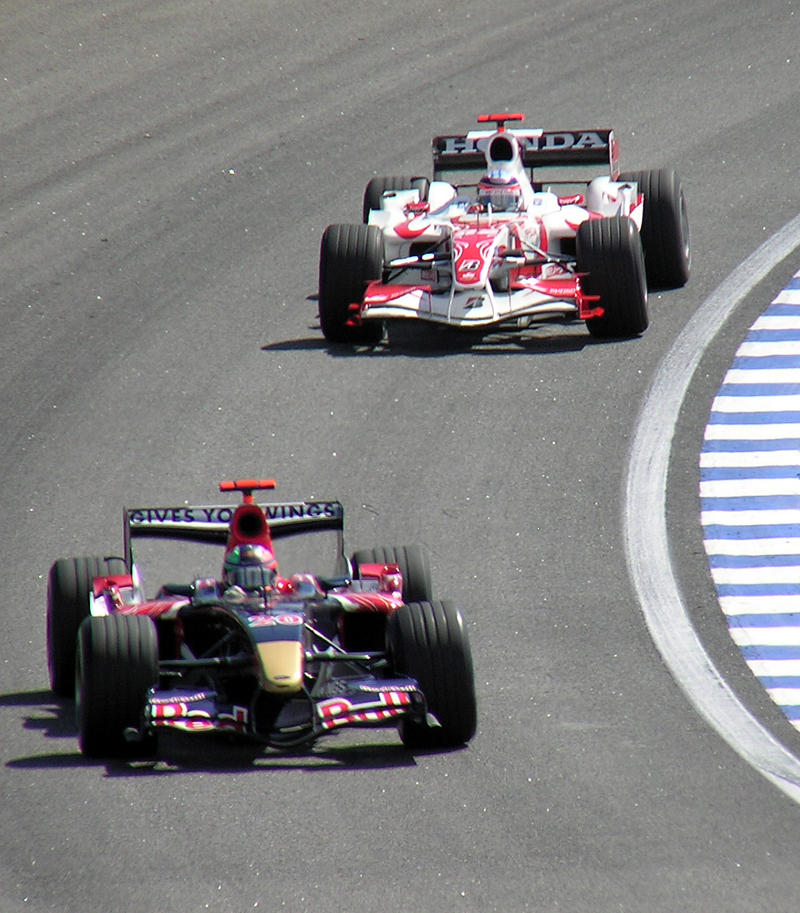
Sato chasing Vitantonio Liuzzi at the 2006 Brazilian Grand Prix, the last race of the season. At the race, he recorded best result of the season for the car and team with 10th position.

The car was a refined version of the SA05, which in turn was a development of the Arrows A23 chassis from 2002. It featured revised aerodynamics, suspension and a new quick-shift gearbox, along with a lightened chassis and provided a worthwhile improvement in performance. A new livery with more red was also used. This culminated with a fine display at the Brazilian GP, where Sato finished 10th out of 16 finishers, and he and Yamamoto set ninth- and seventh-fastest laps of the race respectively.

Despite this effort, the team were unclassified in the Constructors' Championship, with no points. The car was followed by the SA07. However, the SA06 would still be used: on January 15, 2007, retired F1 drivers Aguri Suzuki (the team owner), Martin Brundle and Christian Danner all drove the car at Silverstone.

Following Super Aguri's financial collapse and withdrawal from F1 in 2008, an SA06 chassis was sold to a Japanese buyer for £85,600 in an auction held by the team's liquidators.

== Super Aguri SA06B ==
The Super Aguri SA06B debuted at the Japanese Grand Prix with updated aerodynamic parts and a narrowed rear end.

== Complete Formula One results ==
(key) (results in bold indicate pole position)

Year	Team	Engine	Tyres	Drivers	1	2	3	4	5	6	7	8	9	10	11	12	13	14	15	16	17	18	Points	WCC
2006	Super Aguri	Honda V8	**B**		BHR	MAL	AUS	SMR	EUR	ESP	MON	GBR	CAN	USA	FRA	GER	HUN	TUR	ITA	CHN	JPN	BRA	0	NC
2006	Super Aguri	Honda V8	**B**	(Japan) Takuma Sato												Ret	13	NC	16	DSQ	15	10	0	NC
2006	Super Aguri	Honda V8	**B**	(Japan) Sakon Yamamoto												Ret	Ret	Ret	Ret	16	17	16	0	NC
