= Super Aguri F1 =

Formula One team

Super Aguri
- Full name: Super Aguri F1 Team
- Base: Leafield Technical Centre, Oxfordshire, United Kingdom
- Founder(s): Aguri Suzuki
- Noted staff: Mark Preston; Daniele Audetto
- Noted drivers: (Japan) Takuma Sato (United Kingdom) Anthony Davidson (France) Franck Montagny (Japan) Sakon Yamamoto (Japan) Yuji Ide

Formula One World Championship career
- First entry: 2006 Bahrain Grand Prix
- Races entered: 39
- Engines: Honda
- Constructors' Championships: 0
- Drivers' Championships: 0
- Race victories: 0
- Points: 4
- Pole positions: 0
- Fastest laps: 0
- Final entry: 2008 Spanish Grand Prix

Super Aguri F1 was a Formula One team that competed from 2006 to 2008. The team, founded by former F1 driver Aguri Suzuki, was based in Tokyo, Japan, but operated from the former Arrows factory at the Leafield Technical Centre, Oxfordshire, England. The cars were referred to as Super Aguri Hondas, with the team functioning to some degree as an unofficial Honda 'B'-team. After participating in the championship for two years and four months, the team withdrew from F1 after four races in the 2008 season due to financial difficulties. Throughout the team's time in the sport, it scored four points, all of which were scored by Takuma Sato during the 2007 season.

== Team creation ==
Honda had completed the buyout of British American Racing at the end of 2005, keeping Jenson Button as lead driver, but displacing Takuma Sato in favor of Rubens Barrichello after Sato scored only a single point that year, which was his second full season with the team. In Japan, public pressure and Sato's continued popularity persuaded Honda to help Sato continue to compete in Formula One. This was influential in the creation of Super Aguri's F1 project and the engine supply from Super Aguri's official partner Honda.

Talks to start the team began in February 2005, but it was not until September that plans started to take shape. The team registered its intention to enter the Formula One World Championship to the FIA, Formula One's governing body, on 1 November (ahead of the governing body's 15 November deadline). However, the FIA's official press release of the entry list for 2006 confirmed that it had not approved Super Aguri's entry: this was reported to be due to the team's failure to produce the required $48 million entry bond on time. The team re-applied for entry in 2006, and continued to prepare cars for the upcoming season. Having missed the initial registration, the team needed to convince the existing ten teams to unanimously agree to its entry. It appeared that the Midland team was blocking on the grounds of potentially reduced TV revenue, but it was eventually granted the necessary unanimous agreement and the team's entry was confirmed by the FIA on 26 January 2006.

== Racing history ==
=== 2006 ===
In 2006, the cars were powered by customer Honda engines (RA806E 2.4 V8) by a pay lease from its own works team, and used Bridgestone tyres. The chassis, SA05, was an updated version of the 2002 Arrows A23, bought from ex-Minardi principal Paul Stoddart who purchased them when the Arrows team went into receivership. As such, the team's car, infrastructure and operating base had its origins with TWR Arrows. Underlining the links to the former team, the technical side was overseen by former Arrows engineer Mark Preston, who brought many of the old Arrows mechanics back with him. The team had announced plans to produce a new in-house chassis later on in the 2006 season, possibly for the European races, but this never came into fruition. Instead, the team updated their older chassis to become the SA06 – a change which was visible from the German Grand Prix at Hockenheim, onwards.

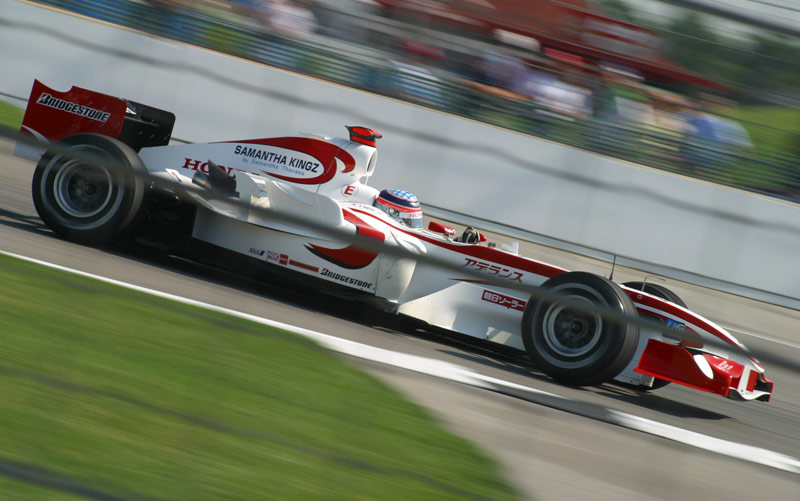
Takuma Sato driving for Super Aguri at the 2006 United States Grand Prix

Takuma Sato and Yuji Ide were the initial race drivers for the team in the 2006 season, with Franck Montagny as the third driver. Ide's selection was seen as unusual due to his age (the oldest F1 rookie at 31 years), lack of European racing experience, and not speaking English.

The team made it onto the grid for the start of the season. In its debut race at Bahrain, Sato successfully completed the Grand Prix while Ide retired on lap 35 with a mechanical failure and after nearly running over his pit crew. Suzuki deemed this race to be a good test for the team as the car had only done a maximum of 10 laps during pre-season testing. The team's second race (in Malaysia) was little better, with again only Sato finishing the race.

Super Aguri's third race, the Australian Grand Prix, saw significant improvement. Ide said "This is the first time that both Taku and I have finished a race, so I am happy about that."

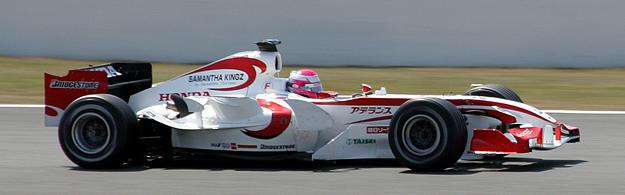
Franck Montagny at the 2006 French Grand Prix

At the San Marino Grand Prix, Ide was involved in a collision with Midland driver Christijan Albers, sending Albers into a series of rolls. Ide was reprimanded by the race stewards. For the European Grand Prix, Ide and Montagny swapped roles within the team with Ide being demoted to test driver, at the request of the FIA. On 10 May 2006, the FIA Permit Office revoked Ide's Super Licence, preventing his return to an F1 seat until at least the 2007 season.

Montagny raced until and including the French Grand Prix, and on 8 June 2006 Sakon Yamamoto became Super Aguri's third driver. Montagny and Yamamoto swapped roles for the German Grand Prix, with Yamamoto taking over Super Aguri's second car.

The team secured a tenth place finish at the Brazilian Grand Prix from Sato, whilst Yamamoto set the seventh-fastest fastest lap, less than a second behind most of the points-finishers.

=== 2007 ===
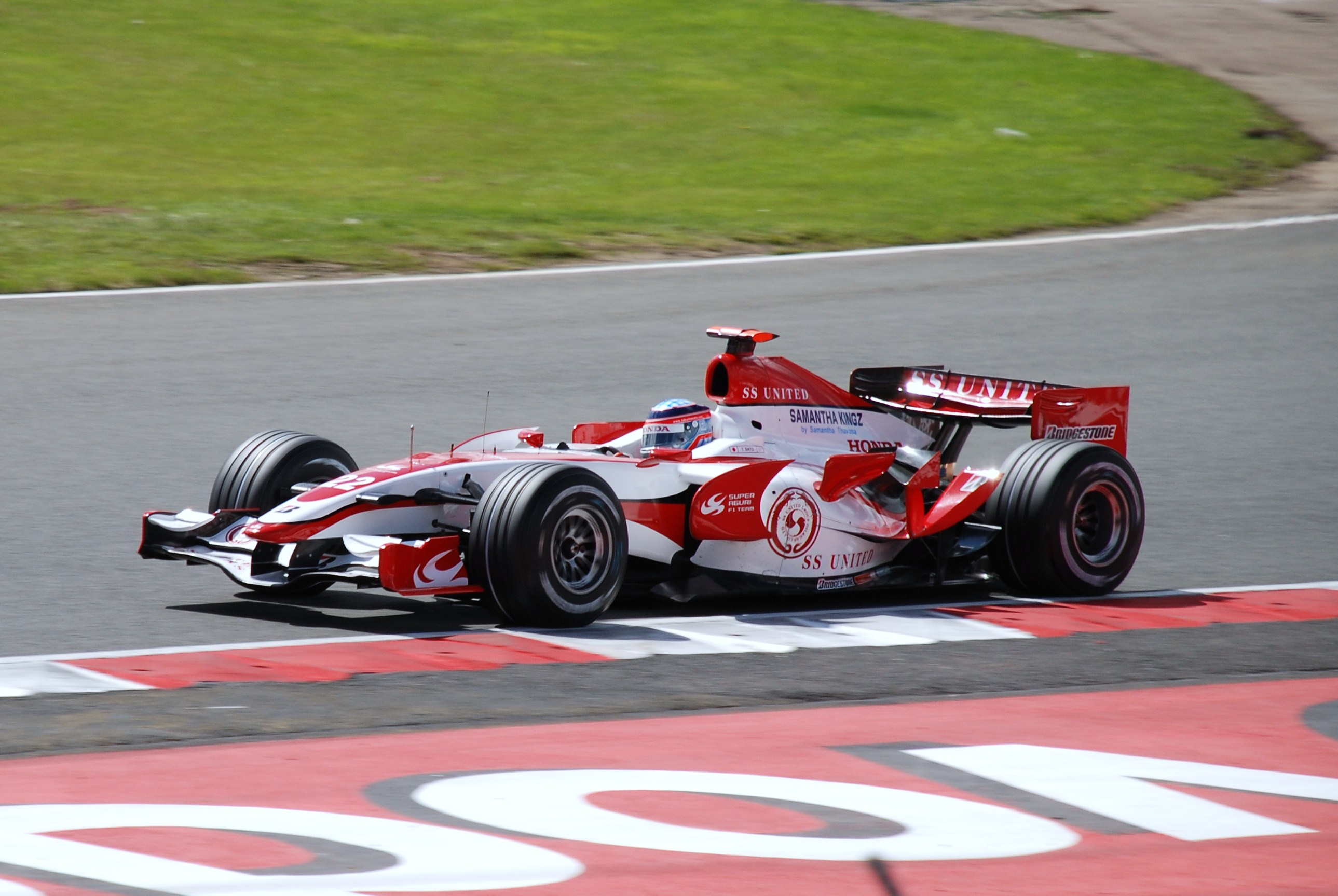
Sato at the 2007 British Grand Prix

Reports suggesting that the team would be using the works Honda chassis of 2006 came under intense resistance by rival teams Williams and Spyker, who contested that the practice was against Formula One regulations. The teams cited the fact that the Concorde Agreement mandated a car may not use any parts designed or constructed by another manufacturer of Formula One cars. Super Aguri (as well as Scuderia Toro Rosso and Red Bull) seemed to be in violation about this. The FIA however did not have the authority to act on the Concorde Agreement without the matter already being resolved in court. However, Super Aguri (as well as the Red Bull teams) stated that they were in compliance with the sport's regulations, though the matter was still of great contention.

Super Aguri announced on 15 November 2006 that Takuma Sato and Anthony Davidson (previously Honda third and test driver) would be driving for the team in 2007. Super Aguri also confirmed, on 15 December, that Giedo van der Garde would be their third driver in the 2007 season. However, the Dutchman left for Spyker F1 before the season began. Sakon Yamamoto, who was a second driver in late 2006, went back to being a test driver in 2007.

The team suffered a major setback when their car for 2007 failed the FIA crash test, with the rear of the car being destroyed more than is allowed. On 2 March, Super Aguri pushed back the launch of its new car by two days, with the SA07 unveiled less than 48 hours before the first practice session for the Australian Grand Prix. Team's drivers Davidson and Sato shocked many people with getting 10th and 11th place in qualifying for Australian GP. Until this, the best result in qualification set by this team was 17th place (by Takuma Sato). Sato dropped to 12th by the race's end, while Anthony Davidson's race was ruined on the first lap when Spyker's Adrian Sutil collided with him after a failed passing move. Davidson's car was thrown into the air, severely jarring his back upon landing. He drove through the pain to finish 16th and was taken to hospital following the race.

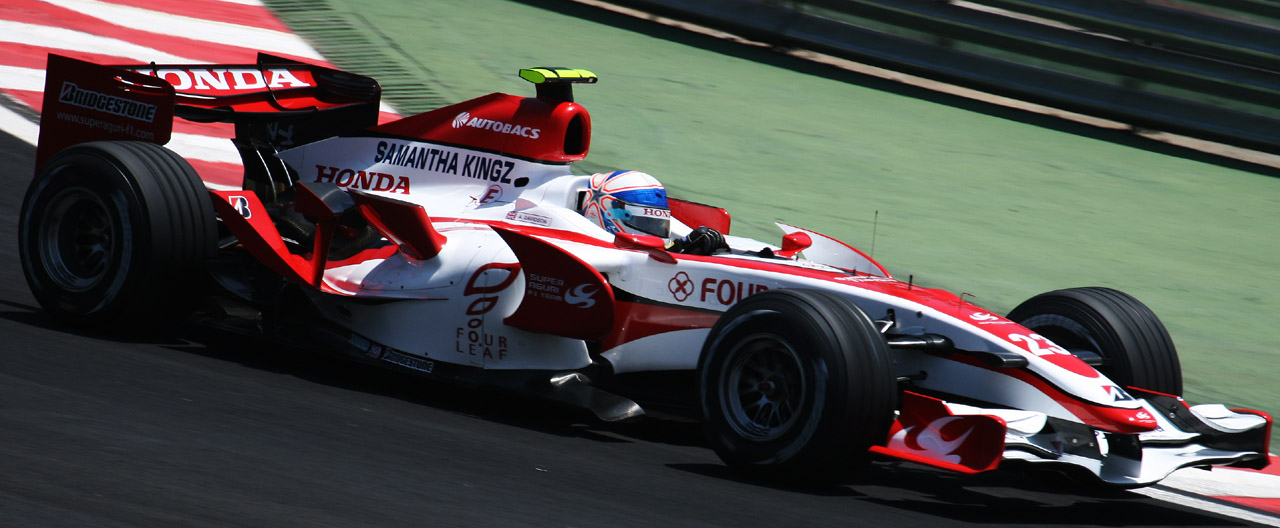
Anthony Davidson driving for Super Aguri at the 2007 Brazilian Grand Prix, the last race of the season. The sponsor was changed from SS United to Fourleaf due to sponsor's nonpayment.

Shortly before the 2007 Australian Grand Prix, the team announced SS United Group Oil & Gas Company as its title sponsor. Also in 2007 Super Aguri signed an official supplier agreement with Speakerbus to supply race intercom. However, SS United Group defaulted on sponsorship payments, forcing the team to cut as many as 30 staff.

At the Spanish Grand Prix the team scored its first point ever, when Takuma Sato finished in 8th place. The Japanese driver benefited from the high attrition rate which saw cars usually in the points from Ferrari, BMW Sauber, Toyota and Williams drop out.

At the Canadian Grand Prix the team scored its highest finish to that date, with Takuma Sato finishing 6th and garnering 3 points, passing defending world champion Fernando Alonso on track en route. ITV commentators mention that had it not been for a botched pit stop, Sato may have finished as high as fourth. Teammate Davidson also looked set to finish in the points until he hit a gopher which ran across the track, forcing him to pit and leaving him out of the points.

After the European Grand Prix, Sakon Yamamoto was signed up by the Spyker F1 team for the remainder of the season, filling in the seat left vacant by Christijan Albers.

=== 2008 ===
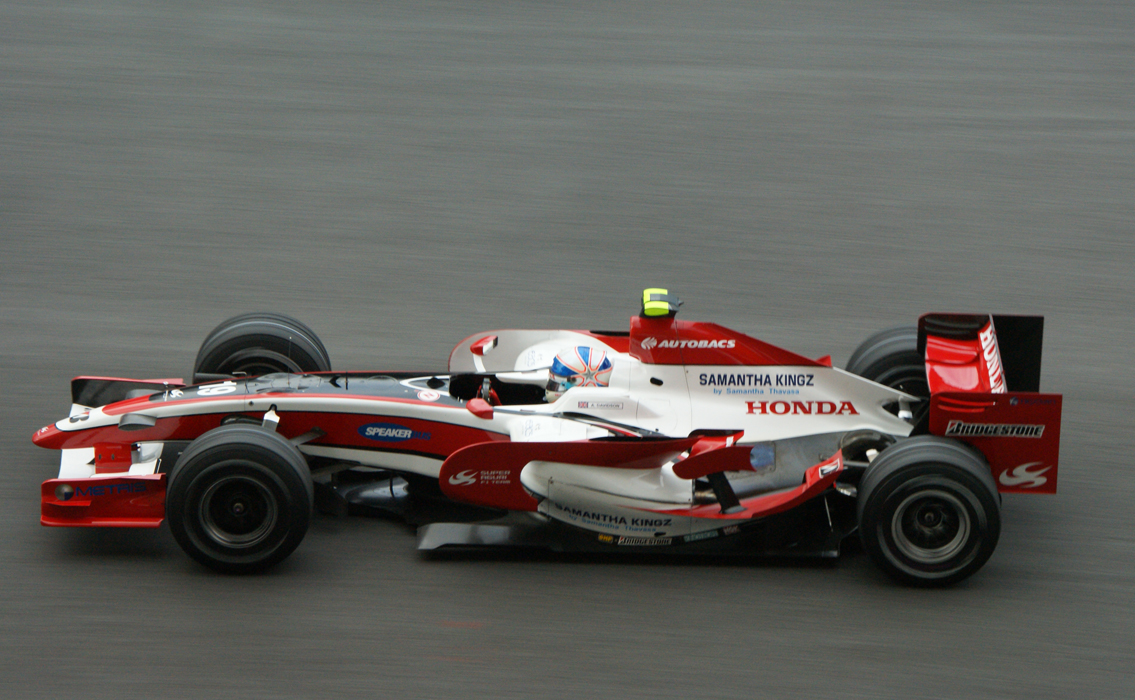
Davidson driving for Super Aguri at the 2008 Malaysian Grand Prix

Super Aguri kept their 2007 drivers Takuma Sato and Anthony Davidson, following the acquisition of an unspecified portion of the team by the Magma Group. Luca Filippi was once linked to a drive in 2008. However, he then signed to the GP2 team ART Grand Prix partnering Romain Grosjean. On 8 January 2008 the team announced that the SA08 would be launched in Barcelona, Spain. On 12 February Super Aguri postponed the SA08 launch and did not announce for how long due to their uncertainty of the future of the team. The team then said that although it had cancelled its attendance at the final pre-season tests because some parts had not arrived, it expected to compete at the first race of the 2008 season in Australia. However, Magma pulled out of their proposed takeover, leaving Super Aguri's future in doubt again.

The Super Aguri F1 Team travelled to Barcelona and competed in the 2008 Spanish Grand Prix, allegedly aided by financial support from Bernie Ecclestone. On arrival at the Istanbul Park for the 2008 Turkish Grand Prix, Super Aguri's trucks and motorhomes were denied entry to the circuit, because Honda Racing CEO Nick Fry reportedly told the race organizers that Super Aguri would not be taking part. On 6 May 2008, team founder and principal Aguri Suzuki announced that they were to withdraw from the 2008 FIA Formula One World Championship with immediate effect due to financial problems, citing the breach of contract by the promised partner SS United Group Oil & Gas Company resulting in the loss of financial backing as putting the team into financial difficulties. It was confirmed on 7 May that Super Aguri had gone into administration, after a team of corporate recovery partners was appointed to seek a buyer for the operation.

In spite of the fact that it is mentioned the Magma Group pulled out, it was down to Nick Fry not accepting the 3-year debt payment plan Magma Group proposed. Fry wanted the whole payment at once or he would not allow the team to compete.

The team's assets were bought by German businessman Franz Hilmer (Formtech GmbH), who applied unsuccessfully to enter the 2010 FIA Formula One World Championship using the Brabham name. The intellectual property of the team is still owned by Formtech Composites, which is situated at the factory in Leafield, United Kingdom.

== Complete Formula One results ==
(key)

Year	Chassis	Engine	Tyres	Drivers	1	2	3	4	5	6	7	8	9	10	11	12	13	14	15	16	17	18	Points	WCC
2006	SA05; SA06	Honda RA806E 2.4 V8	B		BHR	MAL	AUS	SMR	EUR	ESP	MON	GBR	CAN	USA	FRA	GER	HUN	TUR	ITA	CHN	JPN	BRA	0	11th
2006	SA05; SA06	Honda RA806E 2.4 V8	B	(Japan) Takuma Sato	18	14	12	Ret	Ret	17	Ret	17	15^{†}	Ret	Ret	Ret	13	NC	16	DSQ	15	10	0	11th
2006	SA05; SA06	Honda RA806E 2.4 V8	B	(Japan) Yuji Ide	Ret	Ret	13	Ret															0	11th
2006	SA05; SA06	Honda RA806E 2.4 V8	B	(France) Franck Montagny					Ret	Ret	16	18	Ret	Ret	16								0	11th
2006	SA05; SA06	Honda RA806E 2.4 V8	B	(Japan) Sakon Yamamoto												Ret	Ret	Ret	Ret	16	17	16	0	11th
2007	SA07	Honda RA807E 2.4 V8	B		AUS	MAL	BHR	ESP	MON	CAN	USA	FRA	GBR	EUR	HUN	TUR	ITA	BEL	JPN	CHN	BRA		4	9th
2007	SA07	Honda RA807E 2.4 V8	B	(Japan) Takuma Sato	12	13	Ret	8	17	6	Ret	16	14	Ret	15	18	16	15	15^{†}	14	12		4	9th
2007	SA07	Honda RA807E 2.4 V8	B	(United Kingdom) Anthony Davidson	16	16	16^{†}	11	18	11	11	Ret	Ret	12	Ret	14	14	16	Ret	Ret	14		4	9th
2008	SA08	Honda RA808E 2.4 V8	B		AUS	MAL	BHR	ESP	TUR	MON	CAN	FRA	GBR	GER	HUN	EUR	BEL	ITA	SIN	JPN	CHN	BRA	0	11th
2008	SA08	Honda RA808E 2.4 V8	B	(Japan) Takuma Sato	Ret	16	17	13															0	11th
2008	SA08	Honda RA808E 2.4 V8	B	(United Kingdom) Anthony Davidson	Ret	15	16	Ret															0	11th

== See also ==
- Autobacs Racing Team Aguri
- Team Aguri
