= Daniele Audetto =

Italian racing driver

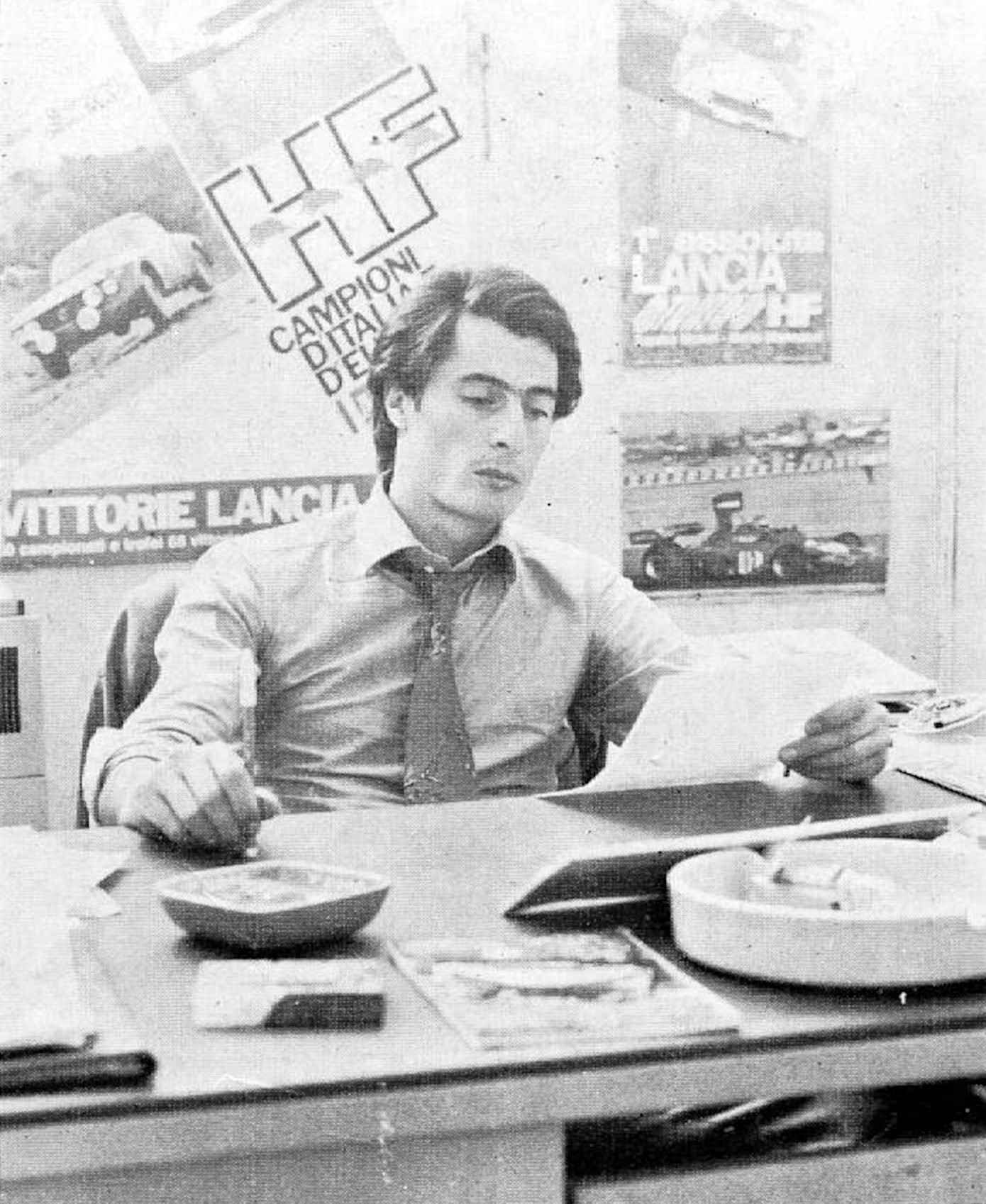
- Audetto as Lancia racing manager in 1974
- Born: 4 May 1943 (age 83)

Daniele Audetto (born 4 May 1943) is an Italian racing manager, former rallycar driver and sponsorship management executive. Previously, he was a managing director at the Super Aguri F1 team. He was formerly a racing manager with FIAT and Arrows.

== Personal life ==
Audetto was born in Turin, Piedmont. He began his working life as a sport journalist.

== Motorsport career ==
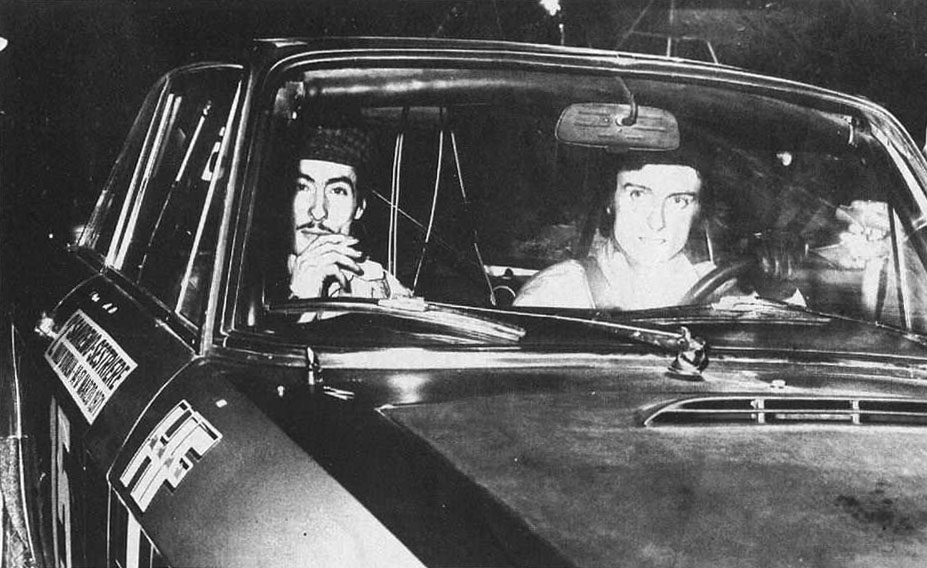
Audetto (left) as co-driver of Luca di Montezemolo at the 1971 Rallye Sanremo-Sestriere

Audetto started his motorsport career in rallying as a co-driver of Luca di Montezemolo and Sandro Munari in the factory Lancia team. During his three years with the team he earned management degree at Bocconi University. He severely injured his legs during an accident at the San Martino di Castrozza Rally in 1972 and turned his attention to management within FIAT. In 1976 he replaced Montezemolo as Ferrari team manager. At the end of that season he was promoted as supervisor of all FIAT motorsport activities.

He left FIAT four years later and began working as an independent sponsor-hunter and liaison, working with a variety of F1 teams and powerboat organisations, notably with the Ceramiche Ragno sponsorship of Arrows F1. After three years he was recruited by Lamborghini Engineering and within a year had been promoted to managing-director, overseeing the company's F1 engine program between 1989 and 1993. After Lamborghini Engineering shut down Audetto worked in the Superbike World Championship.

At the beginning of 1996 Audetto joined Tom Walkinshaw's Ligier operation in F1 but within a few weeks Walkinshaw split with the French team, which was controlled by Flavio Briatore at the time, and bought a majority shareholding in the Arrows F1 team; Audetto, along with many others, followed him and joined Arrows. He stayed with Arrows until it closed down at the end of 2002. The following year he joined Renault F1 to coordinate the engine department and later became the business development director. He left the team at the end of 2003 for Menard, where he was the Vice President and Commercial Director.

Two years later he moved to Super Aguri, where he was appointed as managing director. He remained in that position until the team ceased racing in 2008.

He then took up the position of managing director at HRT F1.
