= 2007 Chinese Grand Prix =

2007 Formula 1 motor car race in China

Coordinates: 31°20′20″N 121°13′11″E

Race 16 of 17 in the 2007 Formula One World Championship
← Previous race	Next race →
- The Shanghai International Circuit

Race details
- Date: 7 October 2007
- Official name: 2007 Formula 1 Sinopec Chinese Grand Prix
- Location: Shanghai International Circuit; Shanghai, China
- Course: Permanent Racing Facility
- Course length: 5.451 km (3.387 miles)
- Distance: 56 laps, 305.066 km (189.559 miles)
- Weather: Intermittent light rain

Pole position
Driver	(United Kingdom) Lewis Hamilton	McLaren-Mercedes
- Time: 1:35.908

Fastest lap
Driver	(Brazil) Felipe Massa	Ferrari
- Time: 1:37.454 on lap 56

Podium
First	(Finland) Kimi Räikkönen	Ferrari
Second	(Spain) Fernando Alonso	McLaren-Mercedes
Third	(Brazil) Felipe Massa	Ferrari

The 2007 Chinese Grand Prix (officially the 2007 Formula 1 Sinopec Chinese Grand Prix) was the sixteenth race of the 2007 FIA Formula One World Championship. It was held on 7 October 2007 at Shanghai International Circuit, Shanghai, China. The race was won by Ferrari's Kimi Räikkönen with Fernando Alonso finishing second and Felipe Massa finishing third. Championship leader Lewis Hamilton suffered the first race retirement of his Formula One career after going off at a wet pit entrance on worn tyres left him stuck in the gravel.

Räikkönen's win marked the 200th Grand Prix victory for Scuderia Ferrari. The race was the last where cigarette advertising was openly displayed on a Formula 1 car, that being the Marlboro sponsorship of Ferrari.

== Report ==
=== Background ===
Going into the race, Lewis Hamilton of McLaren led the Drivers' Championship by 12 points from his team-mate Fernando Alonso, after Alonso crashed in Fuji Speedway. Ferrari's Kimi Räikkönen was the other driver who mathematically had a chance of winning the championship, trailing Hamilton by 17 points. To clinch the championship, Hamilton needed to finish within one point of his team-mate Alonso and within 6 points of Räikkönen. Whatever the result, Hamilton would still be leading the championship after the race.

The weather conditions at the track were affected by Typhoon Krosa which hit the east coast of China.

=== Qualifying ===
Sebastian Vettel was facing a drop of ten places on the grid for his collision with Mark Webber in the previous race (the Japanese Grand Prix), but this punishment was reduced to a reprimand. However, the Toro Rosso driver was then dropped five places on the grid for impeding Heikki Kovalainen during qualifying.

The Spykers of Adrian Sutil and Sakon Yamamoto were both eliminated in the first qualifying session, along with Takuma Sato in the Super Aguri, Alexander Wurz in his final race for Williams, Giancarlo Fisichella in the Renault and Rubens Barrichello in the Honda. However, Vettel's penalty caused him to be relegated behind Barrichello. In the second session, Nico Rosberg in the second Williams, Anthony Davidson in the Super Aguri, Heikki Kovalainen in the Renault, Jarno Trulli in the Toyota and the two Toro Rossos of Vettel and Vitantonio Liuzzi were eliminated.

The final session saw Jenson Button come 10th in a rare top ten qualification. The two BMW Saubers were 8th and 9th, with Nick Heidfeld ahead of Robert Kubica. The Red Bulls of David Coulthard and Mark Webber did very well, qualifying 5th and 7th respectively. They were separated by Ralf Schumacher's Toyota. As usual in the 2007 season, the Ferraris and McLarens occupied the top 4 spots in qualifying, with the Italian team's Felipe Massa pipping McLaren's Fernando Alonso, to third place. This was the first time since the 2005 Japanese Grand Prix that both Red Bulls were in the top seven.

Although Kimi Räikkönen of Ferrari had been the fastest driver in all three practice sessions and in the first two sessions of qualifying, Lewis Hamilton managed to beat this time in his McLaren during the third qualifying session and therefore earned the pole position, the 6th of his career.

=== Race ===
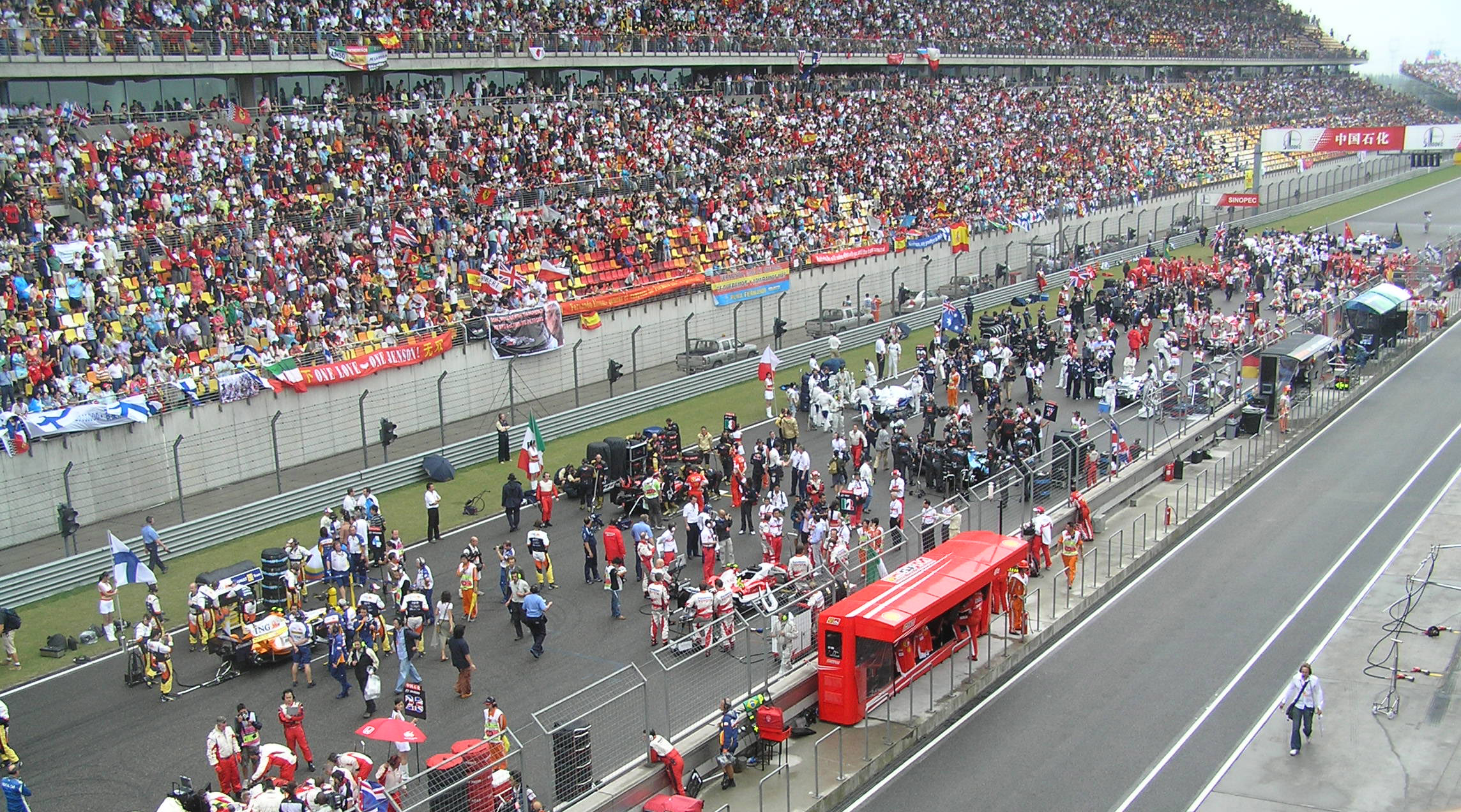
The starting grid before the beginning of the race.

From the morning of the race onwards, conditions at the circuit were wet; this forced all drivers to use intermediate tyres. After the start of the race, the top four remained the same as on the grid with Lewis Hamilton leading in the McLaren from Kimi Räikkönen in the Ferrari, his teammate Felipe Massa and the other McLaren of Fernando Alonso. Vitantonio Liuzzi was the biggest winner from the start in his Toro Rosso, passing Jenson Button's Honda, Robert Kubica in the BMW Sauber and the Red Bull of Mark Webber on lap 1. He also passed Kubica's teammate Nick Heidfeld before too long to run sixth. Ralf Schumacher had his Toyota knocked from behind at the first corner, and slipped to the back of the field.

Anthony Davidson, who had qualified strongly, was the first retirement on lap 11, after his Super Aguri suffered a brake failure. He had already dropped down to twentieth position. Adrian Sutil was the next to drop out in the Spyker, also from twentieth, after he spun in the wet conditions on lap 25. Schumacher, recovering from his earlier incident, had made it up to twelfth on lap 22, before he spun twice and eventually retired on lap 26.

As the track dried Hamilton began to suffer from tyre wear. With his pit stop imminent, McLaren elected to keep Hamilton out and stick to the original strategy. This turned out to be a detrimental choice, because by lap 31, Räikkönen had passed Hamilton when the latter ran wide, allowing Räikkönen to take the lead. Hamilton had to come into the pits. This should not have been a problem, however, as he would still have had enough points to secure the World Championship, had he remained in that position. However, as he entered the pit lane with his tyres worn down to the canvas, he failed to negotiate the sharp left-hander into the pits, beaching his car in the gravel. Despite marshal's efforts to get him back into the race, he suffered the first retirement of his career.

An effective strategy from the BMW Sauber team benefited Robert Kubica, who was propelled into the lead after the Hamilton incident. It was short-lived, however, because after one lap, a hydraulics failure deprived him and the BMW Sauber team of a potential first victory each. This left Räikkönen leading from Alonso, who had overtaken Massa in the pitstops, and Jenson Button.

Räikkönen eventually came home to win comfortably from Alonso, who after having pulled out a considerable lead from Massa was later pulled back until the Brazilian finished less than three seconds behind him. This result ensured the World Drivers' Championship would be decided in the one remaining round - the Brazilian Grand Prix. Sebastian Vettel of Toro Rosso managed to overtake Button in the closing stages to claim fourth place after he had started seventeenth. His one stop strategy gave him the best result of his career thus far. Button came home fifth, the best result of the season for both him and the Honda team. Liuzzi brought the other Toro Rosso home in sixth place, the team's best result of its career. Nick Heidfeld was seventh in the BMW Sauber, and David Coulthard held on for the final points position in the Red Bull despite late pressure from Heikki Kovalainen's Renault

Alexander Wurz finished twelfth in the Williams, and announced his immediate retirement from Formula One the day after the race. Williams announced that he would be replaced by Kazuki Nakajima for the last race of the season.

== Classification ==
=== Qualifying ===
Pos.	No.	Driver	Constructor	Q1	Q2	Q3	Grid
1	2	(United Kingdom) Lewis Hamilton	McLaren-Mercedes	1:35.798	1:35.898	1:35.908	1
2	6	(Finland) Kimi Räikkönen	Ferrari	1:35.692	1:35.381	1:36.044	2
3	5	(Brazil) Felipe Massa	Ferrari	1:35.792	1:35.796	1:36.221	3
4	1	(Spain) Fernando Alonso	McLaren-Mercedes	1:35.809	1:35.845	1:36.576	4
5	14	(United Kingdom) David Coulthard	Red Bull-Renault	1:36.930	1:36.252	1:37.619	5
6	11	(Germany) Ralf Schumacher	Toyota	1:37.135	1:36.709	1:38.013	6
7	15	(Australia) Mark Webber	Red Bull-Renault	1:37.199	1:36.602	1:38.153	7
8	9	(Germany) Nick Heidfeld	BMW Sauber	1:36.737	1:36.217	1:38.455	8
9	10	(Poland) Robert Kubica	BMW Sauber	1:36.309	1:36.116	1:38.472	9
10	7	(United Kingdom) Jenson Button	Honda	1:37.092	1:36.771	1:39.285	10
11	18	(Italy) Vitantonio Liuzzi	Toro Rosso-Ferrari	1:37.047	1:36.862		11
12	19	(Germany) Sebastian Vettel	Toro Rosso-Ferrari	1:37.006	1:36.891		17^{1}
13	12	(Italy) Jarno Trulli	Toyota	1:37.209	1:36.959		12
14	4	(Finland) Heikki Kovalainen	Renault	1:37.225	1:36.991		13
15	23	(United Kingdom) Anthony Davidson	Super Aguri-Honda	1:37.203	1:37.247		14
16	16	(Germany) Nico Rosberg	Williams-Toyota	1:37.144	1:37.483		15
17	8	(Brazil) Rubens Barrichello	Honda	1:37.251			16
18	3	(Italy) Giancarlo Fisichella	Renault	1:37.290			18
19	17	(Austria) Alexander Wurz	Williams-Toyota	1:37.456			19
20	22	(Japan) Takuma Sato	Super Aguri-Honda	1:38.218			20
21	20	(Germany) Adrian Sutil	Spyker-Ferrari	1:38.668			21
22	21	(Japan) Sakon Yamamoto	Spyker-Ferrari	1:39.336			22

Notes

- ^1 – Sebastian Vettel took a five-place grid penalty for impeding Heikki Kovalainen during qualifying.

=== Race ===
Pos.	No.	Driver	Constructor	Laps	Time/Retired	Grid	Points
1	6	(Finland) Kimi Räikkönen	Ferrari	56	1:37:58.395	2	10
2	1	(Spain) Fernando Alonso	McLaren-Mercedes	56	+9.806	4	8
3	5	(Brazil) Felipe Massa	Ferrari	56	+12.891	3	6
4	19	(Germany) Sebastian Vettel	Toro Rosso-Ferrari	56	+53.509	17	5
5	7	(United Kingdom) Jenson Button	Honda	56	+1:08.666	10	4
6	18	(Italy) Vitantonio Liuzzi	Toro Rosso-Ferrari	56	+1:13.673	11	3
7	9	(Germany) Nick Heidfeld	BMW Sauber	56	+1:14.224	8	2
8	14	(United Kingdom) David Coulthard	Red Bull-Renault	56	+1:20.750	5	1
9	4	(Finland) Heikki Kovalainen	Renault	56	+1:21.186	13	
10	15	(Australia) Mark Webber	Red Bull-Renault	56	+1:24.685	7	
11	3	(Italy) Giancarlo Fisichella	Renault	56	+1:26.683	18	
12	17	(Austria) Alexander Wurz	Williams-Toyota	55	+1 Lap	19	
13	12	(Italy) Jarno Trulli	Toyota	55	+1 Lap	12	
14	22	(Japan) Takuma Sato	Super Aguri-Honda	55	+1 Lap	20	
15	8	(Brazil) Rubens Barrichello	Honda	55	+1 Lap	16	
16	16	(Germany) Nico Rosberg	Williams-Toyota	54	+2 Laps	15	
17	21	(Japan) Sakon Yamamoto	Spyker-Ferrari	53	+3 Laps	22	
Ret	10	(Poland) Robert Kubica	BMW Sauber	33	Hydraulics	9	
Ret	2	(United Kingdom) Lewis Hamilton	McLaren-Mercedes	30	Stuck in Gravel	1	
Ret	11	(Germany) Ralf Schumacher	Toyota	25	Spun off	6	
Ret	20	(Germany) Adrian Sutil	Spyker-Ferrari	24	Accident	21	
Ret	23	(United Kingdom) Anthony Davidson	Super Aguri-Honda	11	Brakes	14	

== Championship standings after the race ==
Drivers' Championship standings

+/–	Pos.	Driver	Points
	1	(United Kingdom) Lewis Hamilton*	107
	2	(Spain) Fernando Alonso*	103
	3	(Finland) Kimi Räikkönen*	100
	4	(Brazil) Felipe Massa	86
	5	(Germany) Nick Heidfeld	58

Constructors' Championship standings

+/–	Pos.	Constructor	Points
	1	(Italy) Ferrari*	186
	2	(Germany) BMW Sauber	94
	3	(France) Renault	51
	4	(United Kingdom) Williams-Toyota	28
	5	(Austria) Red Bull-Renault	24

- Note: Only the top five positions are included for both sets of standings.
- Bold text and an asterisk indicates competitors who still had a theoretical chance of becoming World Champion.

Previous race: 2007 Japanese Grand Prix	FIA Formula One World Championship; 2007 season	Next race: 2007 Brazilian Grand Prix
Previous race: 2006 Chinese Grand Prix	Chinese Grand Prix	Next race: 2008 Chinese Grand Prix
