= 2006 European Grand Prix =

Coordinates: 50°20′08″N 6°56′51″E

Race 5 of 18 in the 2006 Formula One World Championship
← Previous race	Next race →
- Nürburgring

Race details
- Date: 7 May 2006
- Official name: 2006 Formula 1 Grand Prix of Europe
- Location: Nürburgring, Nürburg, Germany
- Course: Permanent racing facility
- Course length: 5.148 km (3.2 miles)
- Distance: 60 laps, 308.88 km (192 miles)
- Weather: Sunny, 20°C

Pole position
Driver	(Spain) Fernando Alonso	Renault
- Time: 1:29.816

Fastest lap
Driver	(Germany) Michael Schumacher	Ferrari
- Time: 1:32.099 on lap 39

Podium
First	(Germany) Michael Schumacher	Ferrari
Second	(Spain) Fernando Alonso	Renault
Third	(Brazil) Felipe Massa	Ferrari

The 2006 European Grand Prix (formally the 2006 Formula 1 Grand Prix of Europe) was a Formula One motor race held at the Nürburgring in Nürburg, Germany on 7 May 2006. The 60-lap race was the fifth round of the 2006 Formula One season. It was won by Ferrari driver Michael Schumacher who took his second victory of the season. Polesitter Fernando Alonso finished in second position for the Renault team, whilst the second Ferrari of Felipe Massa achieved his first podium finish of the season with third place.

Franck Montagny made his Formula One début, becoming the first French F1 driver since Olivier Panis at the 2004 Japanese Grand Prix. Schumacher was the last to win his home race until Fernando Alonso in 2012.

== Background ==
The event was held at the Nürburgring for the 36th time in the circuit's history. It was the 11th edition of the European Grand Prix at this venue and the fifth round of the 2006 championship.

=== Championship standings before the race ===
Fernando Alonso had been leading the championship since the get-go and had already gathered 36 points. Michael Schumacher's thrilling victory in Imola had lifted him into second place with 21 points. Kimi Räikkönen was in third with 18 points.

=== Driver changes ===
Franck Montagny was originally scheduled to act as the third driver for Super Aguri, but was promoted to a race seat after team driver Yuji Ide had his FIA Super License revoked for erratic driving in prior races that season. Ide was set to act as the team's third driver for this race, according to the team, until the revocation came down. The license revocation meant Ide could no longer participate in Formula One.

== Practice ==
Three free practice sessions were held. The first and second session were headed by Williams's third driver Alexander Wurz, before the third and most representative session saw the Ferraris of Michael Schumacher and Felipe Massa top the timings.

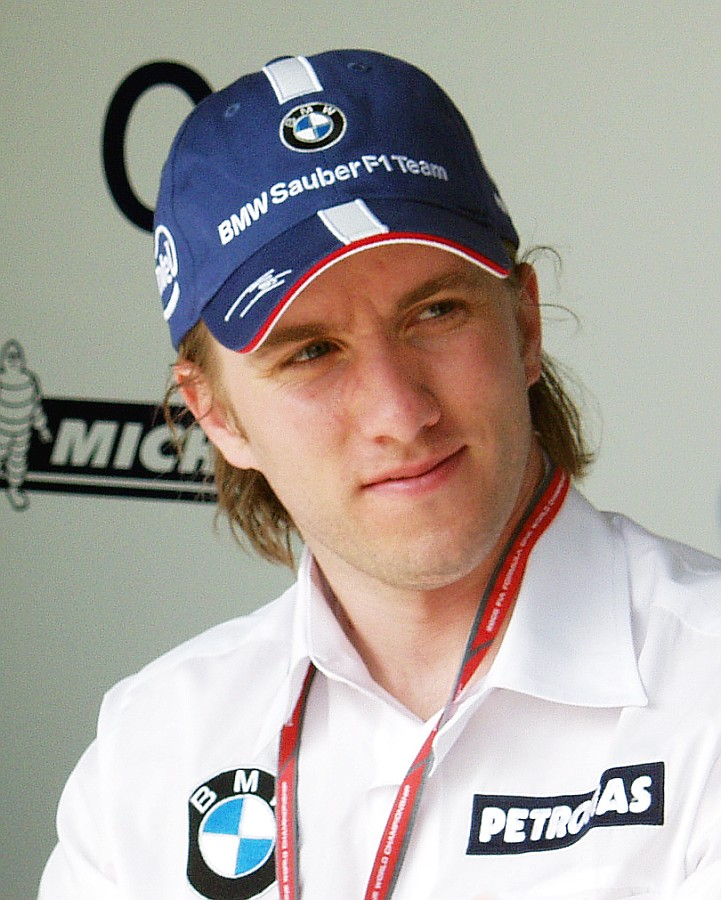
Nick Heidfeld on the Friday before the race.

=== Friday drivers ===
The bottom 6 teams in the 2005 Constructors' Championship and Super Aguri were entitled to run a third car in free practice on Friday. These drivers drove on Friday but did not compete in qualifying or the race:

Constructor	Nat	Driver
Williams-Cosworth	(Austria)	Alexander Wurz
Honda	(United Kingdom)	Anthony Davidson
Red Bull-Ferrari	(Netherlands)	Robert Doornbos
BMW Sauber	(Poland)	Robert Kubica
MF1-Toyota	(Germany)	Adrian Sutil
Toro Rosso-Cosworth	(Switzerland)	Neel Jani
Super Aguri-Honda		none

== Qualifying ==
The qualifying session was affected by a red flag situation appearing during Q1 with 3½ minutes left on the timing monitors. Unfortunately, this was due to a software glitch in the timing system, and the session was quickly restarted. Jacques Villeneuve initially finished outside the top 16, but his time, set on a lap which he finished during the red flag, was reinstated. This placed him 7th in the session. Christian Klien had abandoned his lap, thinking it would not count, and he felt to have lost out through it.

Pos.	No.	Driver	Constructor	Q1	Q2	Q3	Grid
1	1	(Spain) Fernando Alonso	Renault	1:31.138	1:30.336	1:29.816	1
2	5	(Germany) Michael Schumacher	Ferrari	1:31.235	1:30.013	1:30.028	2
3	6	(Brazil) Felipe Massa	Ferrari	1:31.921	1:30.732	1:30.407	3
4	11	(Brazil) Rubens Barrichello	Honda	1:31.671	1:30.469	1:30.754	4
5	3	(Finland) Kimi Räikkönen	McLaren-Mercedes	1:31.263	1:30.203	1:30.933	5
6	12	(United Kingdom) Jenson Button	Honda	1:31.420	1:30.755	1:30.940	6
7	8	(Italy) Jarno Trulli	Toyota	1:31.809	1:30.733	1:31.419	7
8	4	(Colombia) Juan Pablo Montoya	McLaren-Mercedes	1:31.774	1:30.671	1:31.880	8
9	9	(Australia) Mark Webber	Williams-Cosworth	1:31.712	1:30.892	1:33.405	19^{1}
10	17	(Canada) Jacques Villeneuve	BMW Sauber	1:31.545	1:30.865	1:36.998	9^{2}
11	7	(Germany) Ralf Schumacher	Toyota	1:31.470	1:30.944		10
12	10	(Germany) Nico Rosberg	Williams-Cosworth	1:32.053	1:31.194		22^{1}
13	2	(Italy) Giancarlo Fisichella	Renault	1:31.574	1:31.197		11
14	14	(United Kingdom) David Coulthard	Red Bull-Ferrari	1:31.742	1:31.227		12
15	16	(Germany) Nick Heidfeld	BMW Sauber	1:31.457	1:31.422		13
16	20	(Italy) Vitantonio Liuzzi	Toro Rosso-Cosworth	1:32.651	1:31.728		14
17	15	(Austria) Christian Klien	Red Bull-Ferrari	1:32.901			15
18	19	(Netherlands) Christijan Albers	MF1-Toyota	1:32.936			16
19	21	(United States) Scott Speed	Toro Rosso-Cosworth	1:32.992			17
20	18	(Portugal) Tiago Monteiro	MF1-Toyota	1:33.658			18
21	22	(Japan) Takuma Sato	Super Aguri-Honda	1:35.239			20
22	23	(France) Franck Montagny	Super Aguri-Honda	1:46.505			21

Notes

- ^1 – Mark Webber and Nico Rosberg both had their engines changed, and were both dropped ten places on the grid on Sunday. They started the race in 19th and 22nd places respectively.
- ^2 – Jacques Villeneuve originally qualified 8th with a time of 1:31.542, but his fastest three laps from the third qualifying session were deleted due to blocking the Renault of Giancarlo Fisichella.

== Race ==
The race was held on 7 May 2006 and was run for 60 laps.

=== Race report ===
Fernando Alonso kept his lead at the start. Felipe Massa challenged his teammate for second, but Michael Schumacher held on through the first corner. Ralf Schumacher hit Vitantonio Liuzzi, who then collided with David Coulthard. Liuzzi was left stranded on track, which brought out the safety car. Coulthard recovered to do a pit stop but retired a lap later. The safety car was deployed for three laps.

At the restart, Kimi Räikkönen passed Jenson Button for fourth but little else changed in the order. The front runners pitted on laps 17 and 18 and kept their relative positions. Alonso and Schumacher traded fastest laps until the Renault driver pitted on lap 38. The German was now in free air and pushed his Ferrari for three more laps. He rejoined the race a whopping five seconds ahead of his Spanish rival and managed to extend his advantage even further.

In the final stages, Massa and Räikkönen challenged Alonso for second place, but did not take any risks and the order was unchanged. Massa scored his first podium finish in Formula One.

=== Race classification ===
Pos	No	Driver	Constructor	Tyre	Laps	Time/Retired	Grid	Points
1	5	(Germany) Michael Schumacher	Ferrari	B	60	1:35:58.765	2	10
2	1	(Spain) Fernando Alonso	Renault	MI	60	+3.751	1	8
3	6	(Brazil) Felipe Massa	Ferrari	B	60	+4.447	3	6
4	3	(Finland) Kimi Räikkönen	McLaren-Mercedes	MI	60	+4.879	5	5
5	11	(Brazil) Rubens Barrichello	Honda	MI	60	+1:12.586	4	4
6	2	(Italy) Giancarlo Fisichella	Renault	MI	60	+1:14.116	11	3
7	10	(Germany) Nico Rosberg	Williams-Cosworth	B	60	+1:14.565	22	2
8	17	(Canada) Jacques Villeneuve	BMW Sauber	MI	60	+1:29.364	9	1
9	8	(Italy) Jarno Trulli	Toyota	B	59	+1 Lap	7	
10	16	(Germany) Nick Heidfeld	BMW Sauber	MI	59	+1 Lap	13	
11	21	(United States) Scott Speed	Toro Rosso-Cosworth	MI	59	+1 Lap	17	
12	18	(Portugal) Tiago Monteiro	MF1-Toyota	B	59	+1 Lap	18	
13	19	(Netherlands) Christijan Albers	MF1-Toyota	B	59	+1 Lap	16	
Ret	7	(Germany) Ralf Schumacher	Toyota	B	52	Engine	10	
Ret	4	(Colombia) Juan Pablo Montoya	McLaren-Mercedes	MI	52	Engine	8	
Ret	22	(Japan) Takuma Sato	Super Aguri-Honda	B	45	Hydraulics	20	
Ret	23	(France) Franck Montagny	Super Aguri-Honda	B	29	Hydraulics	21	
Ret	12	(United Kingdom) Jenson Button	Honda	MI	28	Engine	6	
Ret	15	(Austria) Christian Klien	Red Bull-Ferrari	MI	28	Transmission	15	
Ret	9	(Australia) Mark Webber	Williams-Cosworth	B	12	Hydraulics	19	
Ret	14	(United Kingdom) David Coulthard	Red Bull-Ferrari	MI	2	Collision damage	12	
Ret	20	(Italy) Vitantonio Liuzzi	Toro Rosso-Cosworth	MI	0	Collision damage	14	

== Championship standings after the race ==
Drivers' Championship standings

	Pos.	Driver	Points
	1	(Spain) Fernando Alonso	44
	2	(Germany) Michael Schumacher	31
	3	(Finland) Kimi Räikkönen	23
	4	(Italy) Giancarlo Fisichella	18
2	5	(Brazil) Felipe Massa	15

Constructors' Championship standings

	Pos.	Constructor	Points
	1	(France) Renault	62
1	2	(Italy) Ferrari	46
1	3	(United Kingdom) McLaren-Mercedes	38
	4	(Japan) Honda	19
	5	(Germany) BMW Sauber	11

- Note: Only the top five positions are included for both sets of standings.

== See also ==
- 2006 European GP2 Series round

Previous race: 2006 San Marino Grand Prix	FIA Formula One World Championship; 2006 season	Next race: 2006 Spanish Grand Prix
Previous race: 2005 European Grand Prix	European Grand Prix	Next race: 2007 European Grand Prix
