= 2008 Chinese Grand Prix =

Coordinates: 31°20′20″N 121°13′11″E

Race 17 of 18 in the 2008 Formula One World Championship
← Previous race	Next race →

Race details
- Date: 19 October 2008
- Official name: 2008 Formula 1 Sinopec Chinese Grand Prix
- Location: Shanghai International Circuit; Shanghai, People's Republic of China
- Course: Permanent Racing Facility
- Course length: 5.451 km (3.387 miles)
- Distance: 56 laps, 305.066 km (189.559 miles)
- Weather: Dry

Pole position
Driver	(United Kingdom) Lewis Hamilton	McLaren-Mercedes
- Time: 1:36.303

Fastest lap
Driver	(United Kingdom) Lewis Hamilton	McLaren-Mercedes
- Time: 1:36.325 on lap 13

Podium
First	(United Kingdom) Lewis Hamilton	McLaren-Mercedes
Second	(Brazil) Felipe Massa	Ferrari
Third	(Finland) Kimi Räikkönen	Ferrari

The 2008 Chinese Grand Prix (officially the 2008 Formula 1 Sinopec Chinese Grand Prix) was a Formula One motor race held on 19 October 2008 at the Shanghai International Circuit. It was the 17th and penultimate race of the 2008 Formula One World Championship. Lewis Hamilton for the McLaren team won the 56-lap race from pole position. Ferrari driver Felipe Massa finished second, and Kimi Räikkönen was third in the other Ferrari.

Hamilton, the eventual Drivers' Champion, led the Championship going into the race, and started from pole position alongside Räikkönen. Second in the Drivers' Championship, Massa began from third, next to Fernando Alonso of Renault. The first three drivers retained their positions into the first corner, but Alonso was passed by Hamilton's McLaren teammate Heikki Kovalainen. Alonso, however, was able to regain the place midway through the first lap. Over the course of the race, Hamilton extended a considerable lead over the two Ferraris. Massa passed Räikkönen with seven laps remaining, to improve his chances of surpassing Hamilton's points tally at the final race in Brazil.

The result extended Ferrari's lead over McLaren in the Constructors' Championship from seven to 11 points. Third-placed in the Drivers' Championship, Robert Kubica's sixth place at the Grand Prix eliminated his hopes of winning the Championship, and reduced his lead over fourth-placed Räikkönen to six points. Nelson Piquet Jr. scored his last world championship points at this race.

== Background ==
The Grand Prix was contested by 20 drivers, in ten teams of two. The teams, also known as "constructors", were Ferrari, McLaren-Mercedes, Renault, Honda, Force India, BMW Sauber, Toyota, Red Bull Racing, Williams and Toro Rosso. As is normal for a Formula One race, Bridgestone brought two different tyre compounds to the race; the softer of the two marked by a single white stripe down one of the grooves.

Prior to the race, McLaren driver Lewis Hamilton led the Drivers' Championship with 84 points, and Ferrari driver Felipe Massa was second with 79 points. Behind them in the Drivers' Championship, Robert Kubica was third with 72 points in a BMW Sauber, and Massa's Ferrari teammate Kimi Räikkönen was fourth with 63 points. Kubica's teammate Nick Heidfeld was fifth with 56 points. In the Constructors' Championship, Ferrari were leading with 142 points, seven points ahead of their rivals McLaren–Mercedes, whom they had overtaken at the previous race. BMW Sauber were third with 128 points. In the battle for fourth place, Renault had 66 points, now 16 points ahead of Toyota.

At the previous race in Japan, the gap between Hamilton and Massa had closed by two points. Hamilton had started from pole position ahead of Räikkönen, but had a poor start. At the first corner he braked late, and forced Räikkönen wide. He was later given a penalty, which dropped him down the field from where he was unable to recover to a points scoring position. Massa also received a penalty for a collision with Hamilton on the second lap, but was able to finish in seventh position. The British press described Hamilton's move as "impetuosity and untamed aggression", saying that the McLaren driver would have to adopt a more conservative race strategy in China. For his part, Hamilton said that he would be taking no risks:

We will approach it the same as always. We won't be taking risks, but we will be attacking as much as we can to win the race. If I'm in a position where we are looking to gain good points, and it's an unnecessary risk to make a manoeuvre, then I won't be doing that. It's always important to be fast, but it's not necessarily the fastest car that wins. Being fast is great for positioning, and maybe getting out in front, and then afterwards trying to stay calm.

With ten points on offer for the winner of the Grand Prix, it was possible that Hamilton would clinch the Championship in Shanghai. Massa remained confident, saying that the race was just like any other: "You have a pressure but it is a different pressure, but you have always the pressure on your side."

Renault driver and two-time Championship winner Fernando Alonso created controversy when he said "if I can help, I will help Massa." Alonso's departure from McLaren after driving for the British team in 2007 had been acrimonious, and Alonso's dislike for the rookie Hamilton was well documented. Talking about Hamilton's penalty in Japan, Alonso said "I don't know what he did, but it's good he's punished anyway." Hamilton refused to be drawn into the controversy: "I don't particularly have an opinion on it," he said, adding that he was interested only in his own race.

== Practice ==
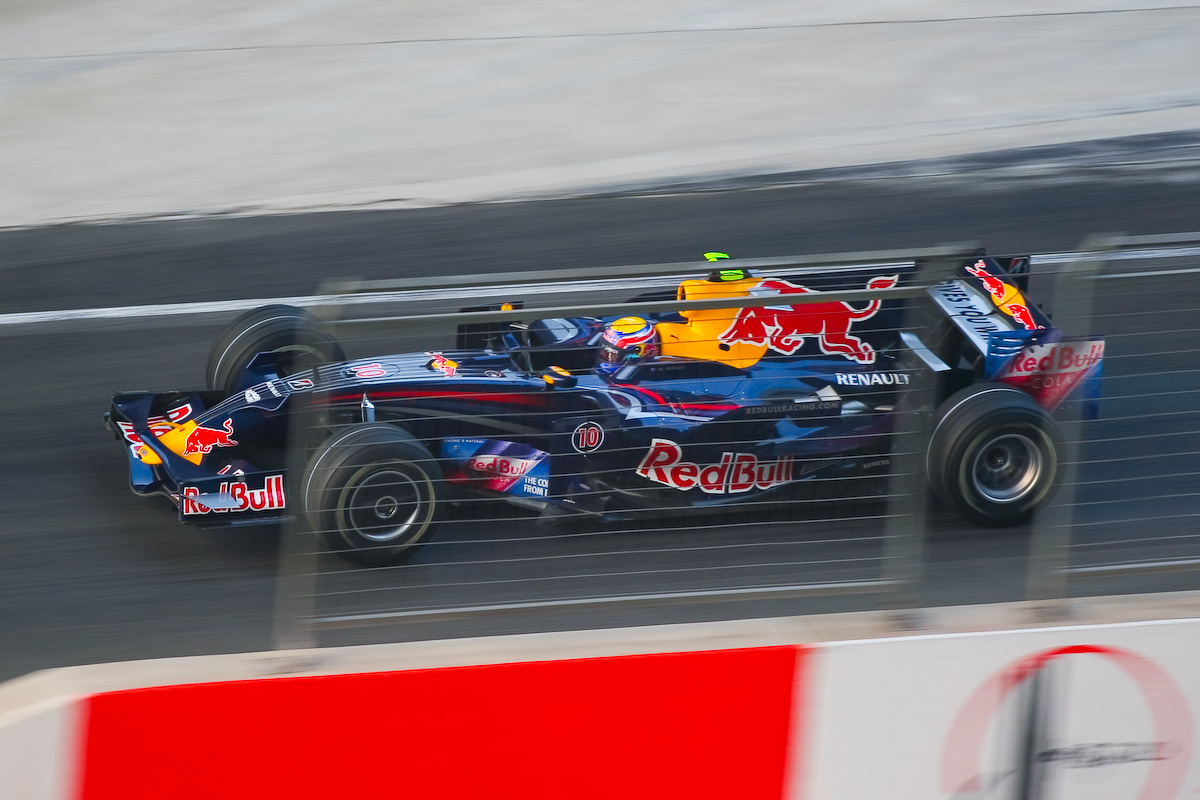
Mark Webber was penalised for changing engines after practice

Three practice sessions were held before the Sunday race—two on Friday, and a third on Saturday. The Friday morning and afternoon sessions each lasted 90 minutes. The third session was held on Saturday morning and lasted an hour. All three sessions were held on a dry track. Hamilton was fastest in the first session with a time of 1:35.630, 0.39 of a second ahead of Massa, who was next quickest. Räikkönen, Heikki Kovalainen of McLaren, Kubica, Alonso and Heidfeld rounded out the top seven. Sébastien Bourdais of Toro Rosso was eighth, having been quickest early in the session. Renault driver Nelson Piquet drove into the gravel beside the pit-lane entry, though managed to rejoin. Hamilton was again quickest in the second session; his early time of 1:35.750 was the fastest of the afternoon. The Renaults were next quickest, ahead of Jarno Trulli of Toyota, Red Bull driver Mark Webber, Massa, Bourdais and Räikkönen. Bourdais spun off at turn two late in the session and beached his car in the gravel. Heidfeld was fastest in the final session with a time of 1:36.061, ahead of Hamilton, Kubica and Kovalainen. Massa, Räikkönen and Alonso lacked pace, and failed to make the top ten. Webber stopped late in the session when his engine failed on the back straight, requiring an engine change before qualifying. This would give him a ten-place penalty on the grid.

== Qualifying ==
The qualifying session on Saturday afternoon was split into three parts. The first part ran for 20 minutes, and cars that finished the session 16th or lower were eliminated from qualifying. The second part of qualifying lasted 15 minutes and eliminated cars that finished in positions 11 to 15. The final part of qualifying determined the positions from first to tenth, and decided pole position. Cars which failed to make the final session could refuel before the race, so ran lighter in those sessions. Cars which competed in the final session of qualifying were not allowed to refuel before the race, and as such carried more fuel than in the previous sessions.

Finally, things seemed to go right for me in qualifying. It's too late for the title, but we definitely learnt a lesson which will be useful for next year. All weekend we've struggled to find the right settings on the car, but then all the work we put in finally came good in [the third session], when the car was pretty good. Certainly, even putting aside what the choices have been in terms of fuel loads, today it would have been difficult to beat the McLaren, but I am happy with the overall result for the team.

— Kimi Räikkönen, following the third qualifying session.

Hamilton clinched his seventh pole position of the season with a time of 1:36.303. He was joined on the front row of the grid by Räikkönen, who qualified 0.342 seconds behind Hamilton's time. Massa took third place, needing a good result to retain the possibility of a Championship victory. Alonso qualified in fourth ahead of Kovalainen, who took fifth after struggling for tyre grip during the final session. Webber was sixth fastest in the final session, but was demoted to 16th on the grid as a result of his penalty. Heidfeld originally qualified sixth, but was penalised three positions for impeding Red Bull driver David Coulthard in the first session. As a result, Toro Rosso driver Sebastian Vettel inherited sixth position, ahead of Trulli and Bourdais. Piquet took tenth position. Kubica's eleventh placing was his worst qualifying result to that point in the season, struggling with his car's set-up throughout his two sessions. Rubens Barrichello of Honda took 13th behind Timo Glock of Toyota, to reach the top 15 for the first time in ten races. Williams driver Nico Rosberg took 14th on the grid. Coulthard failed to move beyond the first session; the Red Bull driver qualified in 15th and blamed Heidfeld for his poor performance. Kazuki Nakajima of Williams, Jenson Button of Honda and the Force Indias of Adrian Sutil and Giancarlo Fisichella would line up on the back two rows of the grid.

=== Qualifying classification ===
Pos	No	Driver	Constructor	Part 1	Part 2	Part 3	Grid
1	22	(United Kingdom) Lewis Hamilton	McLaren-Mercedes	1:35.566	1:34.947	1:36.303	1
2	1	(Finland) Kimi Räikkönen	Ferrari	1:35.983	1:35.355	1:36.645	2
3	2	(Brazil) Felipe Massa	Ferrari	1:35.971	1:35.135	1:36.889	3
4	5	(Spain) Fernando Alonso	Renault	1:35.769	1:35.461	1:36.927	4
5	23	(Finland) Heikki Kovalainen	McLaren-Mercedes	1:35.623	1:35.216	1:36.930	5
6	10	(Australia) Mark Webber	Red Bull-Renault	1:36.238	1:35.686	1:37.083	16^{1}
7	3	(Germany) Nick Heidfeld	BMW Sauber	1:36.224	1:35.403	1:37.201	9^{2}
8	15	(Germany) Sebastian Vettel	Toro Rosso-Ferrari	1:35.752	1:35.386	1:37.685	6
9	11	(Italy) Jarno Trulli	Toyota	1:36.104	1:35.715	1:37.934	7
10	14	(France) Sébastien Bourdais	Toro Rosso-Ferrari	1:36.239	1:35.478	1:38.885	8
11	6	(Brazil) Nelson Piquet Jr.	Renault	1:36.029	1:35.722		10
12	4	(Poland) Robert Kubica	BMW Sauber	1:36.503	1:35.814		11
13	12	(Germany) Timo Glock	Toyota	1:36.210	1:35.937		12
14	17	(Brazil) Rubens Barrichello	Honda	1:36.640	1:36.079		13
15	7	(Germany) Nico Rosberg	Williams-Toyota	1:36.434	1:36.210		14
16	9	(United Kingdom) David Coulthard	Red Bull-Renault	1:36.731			15
17	8	(Japan) Kazuki Nakajima	Williams-Toyota	1:36.863			17
18	16	(United Kingdom) Jenson Button	Honda	1:37.053			18
19	20	(Germany) Adrian Sutil	Force India-Ferrari	1:37.730			19
20	21	(Italy) Giancarlo Fisichella	Force India-Ferrari	1:37.739			20

Notes

- ^1 – Mark Webber dropped ten places on the grid after an unscheduled engine change.
- ^2 – Nick Heidfeld penalised three grid positions for impeding David Coulthard during first qualifying session.

== Race ==
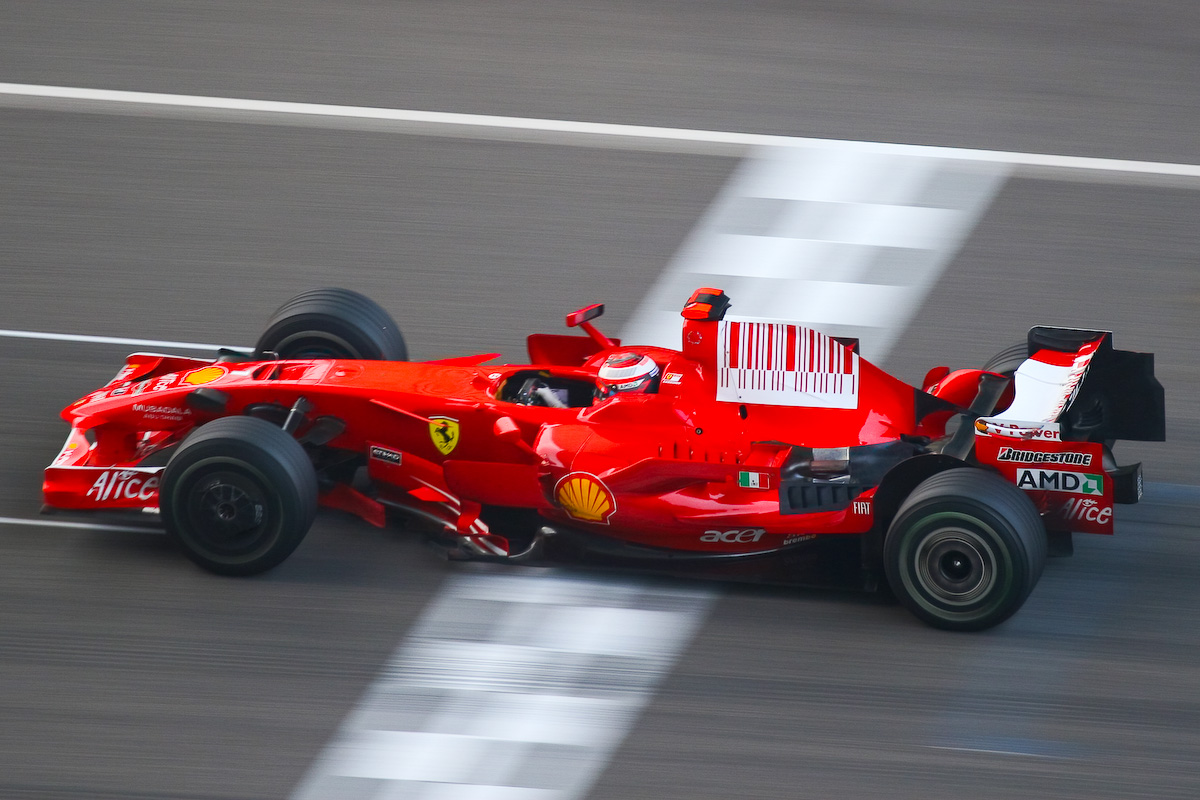
Kimi Räikkönen started from second on the grid

The conditions on the grid were dry before the race. The air temperature was 27 °C (81 °F) and the track temperature was 30 °C (86 °F); weather forecasts suggested a small possibility of rain. Hamilton and Alonso began the race on harder compound tyre; both Ferraris opted for the softer compound. Hamilton accelerated faster than the Ferraris off the line, and retained his lead into the first corner. Kovalainen overtook Alonso to take fourth in the opening corners. However, Alonso pushed Kovalainen hard through the middle sector of the lap, and passed him at the turn 14 hairpin after drafting the McLaren along the back straight. At the end of the first lap, Hamilton led from Räikkönen, Massa, Alonso and Kovalainen. Heidfeld was able to move from ninth on the grid to take sixth, after Bourdais drove into the back of Trulli at the first corner. Bourdais dropped back to 18th; Trulli pitted at the next opportunity as a result of the damage and retired after the second lap.

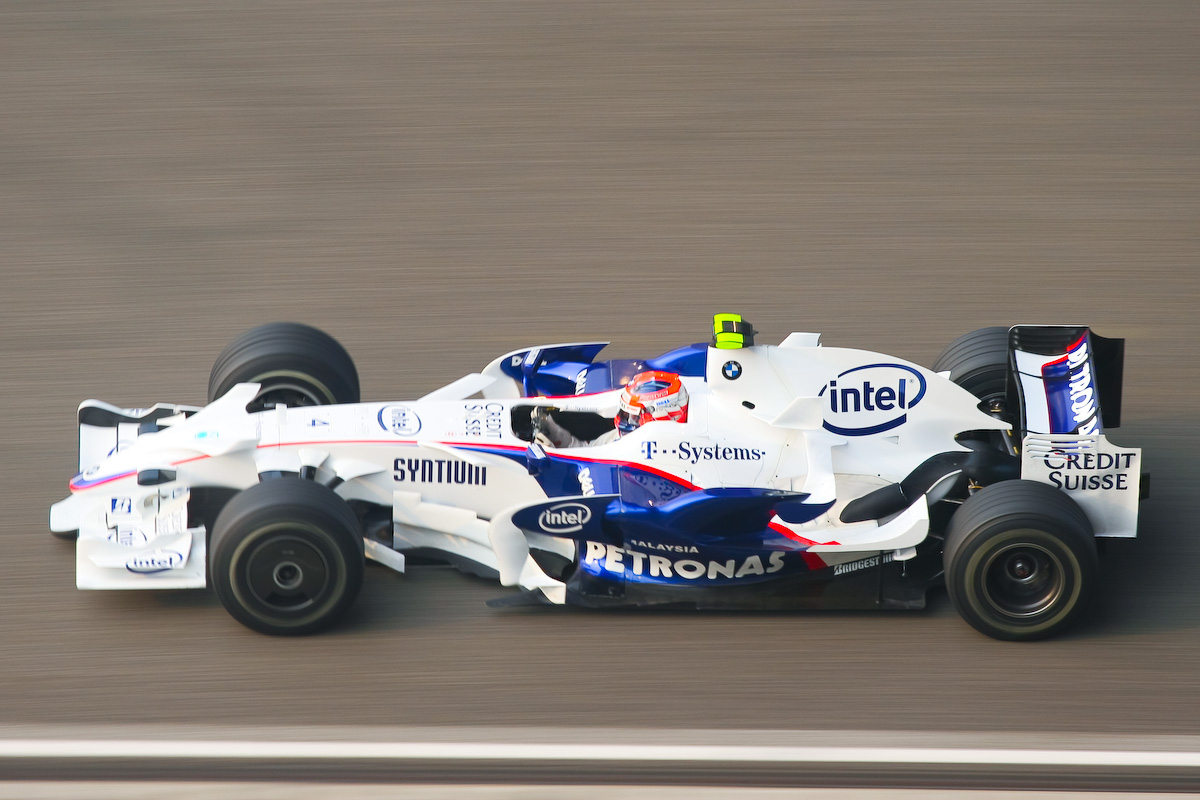
Robert Kubica on his way to his sixth placing

Webber was able to climb from 16th on the grid to take 12th behind Glock, and passed the Toyota on the second lap. Kubica, further up the field, improved on his grid position, moving from 11th to take eighth behind Vettel. However, Hamilton was the quickest on track, as he set new fastest laps on laps three, six and eight, to extend his lead over Räikkönen to more than four seconds. This trend continued until lap 10 when Räikkönen fought back and closed the gap. However, Hamilton extended his lead when he set the fastest lap of the race, a 1:36.325 on lap 13. In the other McLaren, Kovalainen was struggling, running two seconds a lap slower than Hamilton, and dropping back from Alonso to Heidfeld.

The Red Bull of Mark Webber was the first to pit, on lap 12. Webber had passed Barrichello and Piquet in separate manoeuvres to take ninth, but his pit stop dropped him back down to 18th position. Massa and Alonso came in to pit on lap 14, from third and fourth. Kovalainen took the lead of the Grand Prix when Hamilton and Räikkönen paused their battle to take harder tyres and fuel on lap 15. By the time Kovalainen and Heidfeld had pitted on laps 17 and 18, Hamilton had established a commanding lead: 6.9 seconds over Räikkönen and 14.1 seconds over Massa. Räikkönen began to pull back Hamilton's lead over the next ten laps, before losing 1.4 seconds on lap 30.

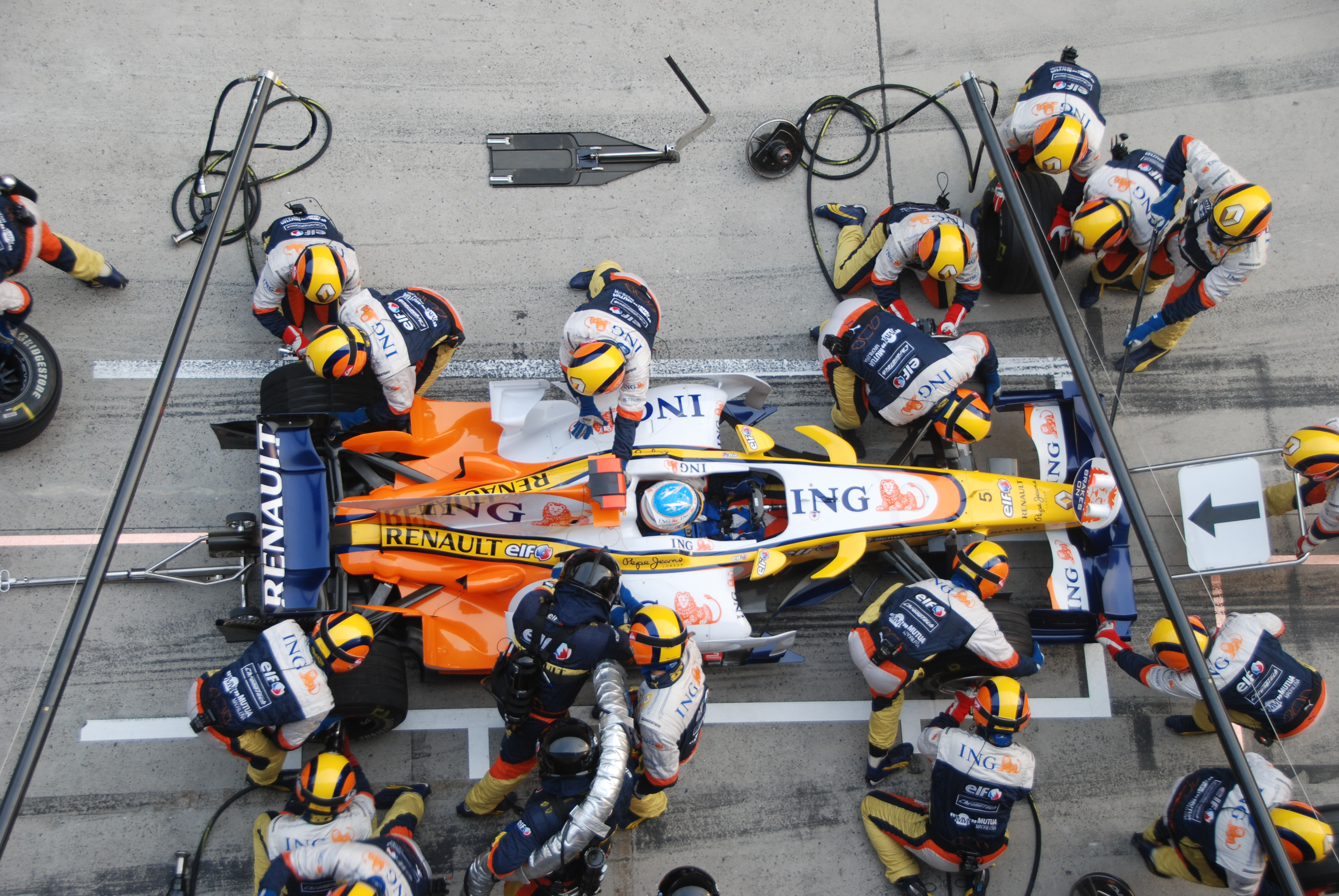
Fernando Alonso during his first pit stop

At the back of the race, Bourdais began a slow climb back up the field. The Toro Rosso driver passed Sutil (who later spun out and retired with a gearbox problem), Nakajima and Coulthard, to sit in 15th by lap 30. Rosberg fought Glock for 12th, until he passed the Toyota at the turn 14 hairpin on lap 12. Rosberg's pit stop relegated him to 18th, dropping six places. Kubica pitted late, on lap 25, dropping from third to ninth, one position outside of the points.

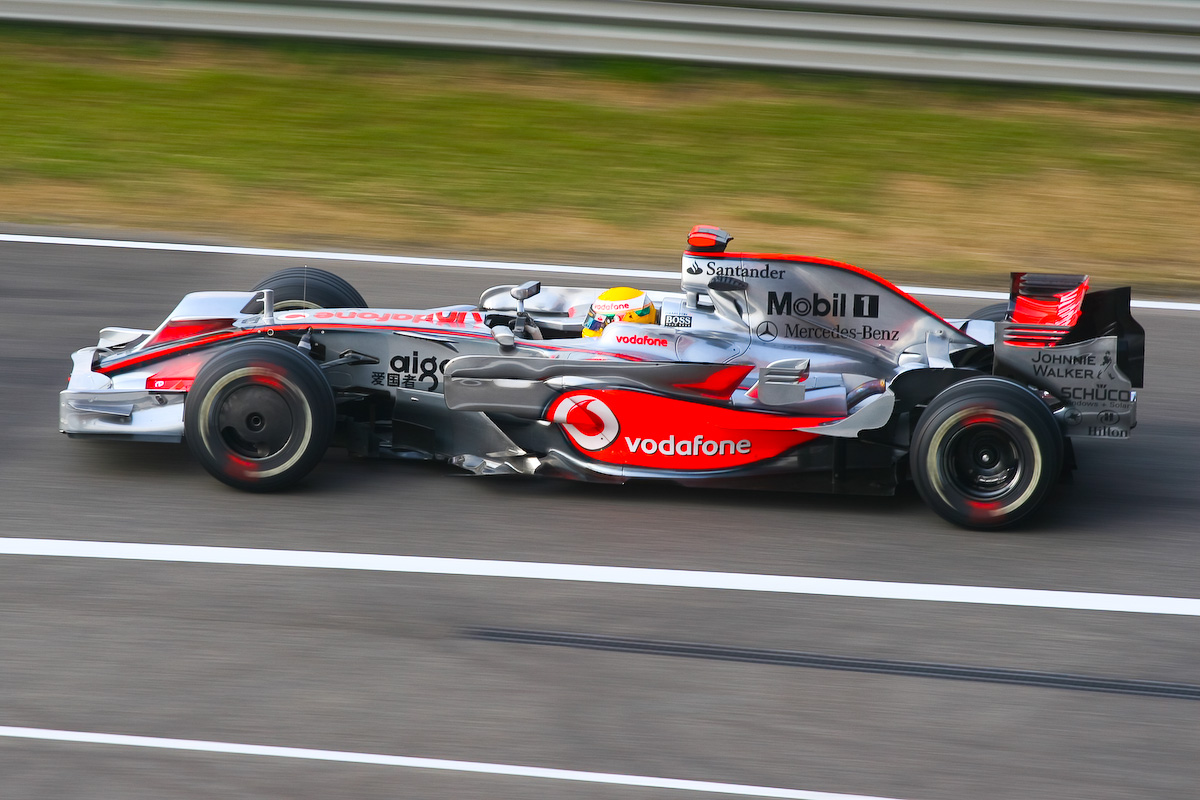
Lewis Hamilton took the win from pole position

Kovalainen suffered a puncture on lap 35. The McLaren limped around the track back to the pit lane on the disintegrating tyre, rejoining in 17th on a replacement. Alonso, Massa, Hamilton and Räikkönen all pitted for the final time over laps 36 to 38. Coming out of the second round of pit stops, Hamilton led Räikkönen by 13 seconds, Räikkönen more than 2.5 seconds ahead of Massa. The gap between the Ferraris began to close, and Massa eased past Räikkönen on the back straight on lap 49, to take second place on the track. Meanwhile, Kovalainen parked his car in the McLaren garage and retired from the race, his team not taking any chances with a problem which had developed with the engine's hydraulics.

Hamilton took his fifth win of the season when he crossed the line at the end of the 56th lap, almost 15 seconds ahead of the second-placed Massa. Räikkönen took third ahead of Alonso. Heidfeld managed to jump from ninth on the grid to finish in fifth place, just ahead of his teammate Kubica, who climbed from eleventh on the grid. A one-stop pit strategy worked well for Glock as he finished seventh; Piquet took eighth. Vettel, Coulthard, Barrichello and Nakajima took the next four places; Bourdais recovered from his early contact with Trulli to take 13th. Webber's initial success with a two-stop strategy faded as he finished 14th. Rosberg took 15th, ahead of Button and Fisichella. Trulli, Sutil and Kovalainen were the three retirements from the 56 lap race.

=== Post-race ===
Well, it was quite straightforward actually. I managed to get everything right on the formation lap. I was perfectly in my position and it was a great start, it was really probably one of the best we've had. I felt it was one of the best we've had this year which was needed. I got into turn one quite clear, I took it easy the first few corners then I started to bridge the gap. Fortunately we were just very, very consistent and I think every lap was faster and very, very few errors throughout the whole run, therefore I was able to create a gap and from there it was pretty smooth sailing.

— Lewis Hamilton, speaking after the race.

The top three finishers appeared on the podium and in the subsequent press conference, where Hamilton praised his team: "they have done a phenomenal job and the car is really a dream to drive." Looking ahead to the next race in Brazil, where Hamilton would enter with a seven-point advantage, the Championship leader seemed confident: "It will be tough and [Ferrari] will be pushing us hard but hopefully as a team we can pull through." Massa admitted that McLaren had the stronger car on the day:

For us we were completely driving on the limit trying to reduce the gap but it was not possible. I was trying to push as Kimi was trying to push to get closer to Lewis but it was not possible. So today unfortunately Lewis had the better car for the whole weekend.

Asked about his pass on Räikkönen in the closing laps, Massa said that "it was the best time for me in the race, I was quite strong and then I caught him and I passed him." Since the 2002 Austrian Grand Prix, where Barrichello ceded the lead to Michael Schumacher, team orders have been banned in Formula One. Räikkönen appeared unbothered when asked about Massa's pass: "I mean we know what we want as a team and that's what we did it. It is normal in these situations." No investigation was undertaken by the stewards at the race. GrandPrix.com played down the incident, saying "Anyone who understands racing understood what was going on and only the silly people objected."

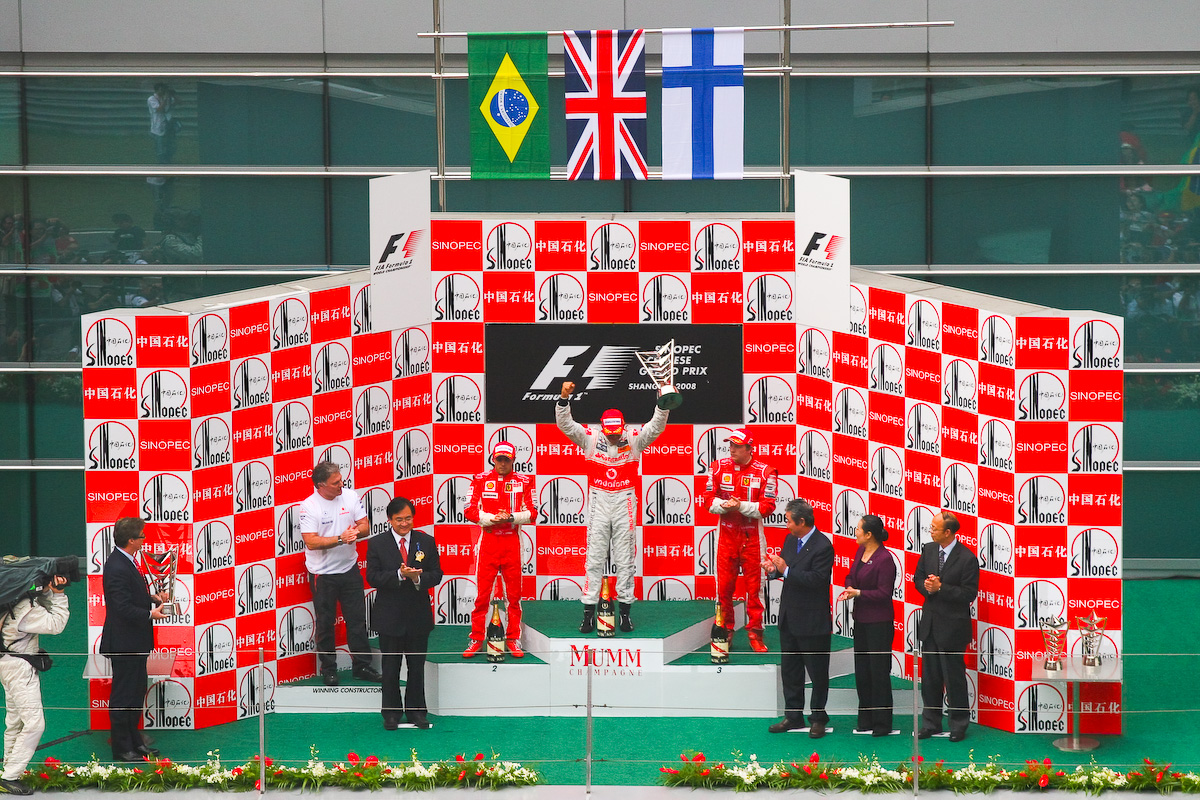
The podium

Kovalainen's car had apparently been fitted with mismatched tyres at the front of the car during the first stint, meaning that the tyres spun in the opposite direction to which they were designed, causing his understeer. At his first pit stop his team, not realising the cause of the problem, had adjusted his front wing to compensate for the understeer and replaced the tyres correctly. This caused further handling problems, and eventually led to his retirement.

Kovalainen's failure to score, combined with the two Ferraris making the top three, meant that Ferrari extended their lead over McLaren in the Constructors' Championship from seven to 11 points. Massa said Ferrari had succeeded in the race: "I think for the Drivers' Championship it was not fantastic but for the Constructors' it was very good." Kubica's sixth place at the Grand Prix ruled out any chance of claiming the Drivers' Championship. The BMW driver said his focus would now be on getting as good a result as possible in Brazil, saying "There is now one race left, and I shall try hard to defend my third place."

=== Race classification ===
Pos	No	Driver	Constructor	Laps	Time/Retired	Grid	Points
1	22	(United Kingdom) Lewis Hamilton	McLaren-Mercedes	56	1:31:57.403	1	10
2	2	(Brazil) Felipe Massa	Ferrari	56	+14.925	3	8
3	1	(Finland) Kimi Räikkönen	Ferrari	56	+16.445	2	6
4	5	(Spain) Fernando Alonso	Renault	56	+18.370	4	5
5	3	(Germany) Nick Heidfeld	BMW Sauber	56	+28.923	9	4
6	4	(Poland) Robert Kubica	BMW Sauber	56	+33.219	11	3
7	12	(Germany) Timo Glock	Toyota	56	+41.722	12	2
8	6	(Brazil) Nelson Piquet Jr.	Renault	56	+56.645	10	1
9	15	(Germany) Sebastian Vettel	Toro Rosso-Ferrari	56	+1:04.339	6	
10	9	(United Kingdom) David Coulthard	Red Bull-Renault	56	+1:14.842	15	
11	17	(Brazil) Rubens Barrichello	Honda	56	+1:25.061	13	
12	8	(Japan) Kazuki Nakajima	Williams-Toyota	56	+1:30.847	17	
13	14	(France) Sébastien Bourdais	Toro Rosso-Ferrari	56	+1:31.457	8	
14	10	(Australia) Mark Webber	Red Bull-Renault	56	+1:32.422	16	
15	7	(Germany) Nico Rosberg	Williams-Toyota	55	+1 Lap	14	
16	16	(United Kingdom) Jenson Button	Honda	55	+1 Lap	18	
17	21	(Italy) Giancarlo Fisichella	Force India-Ferrari	55	+1 Lap	20	
Ret	23	(Finland) Heikki Kovalainen	McLaren-Mercedes	49	Pneumatics	5	
Ret	20	(Germany) Adrian Sutil	Force India-Ferrari	13	Gearbox	19	
Ret	11	(Italy) Jarno Trulli	Toyota	2	Collision damage	7	

== Championship standings after the race ==
Drivers' Championship standings

Pos.	Driver	Points
1	(United Kingdom) Lewis Hamilton*	94
2	(Brazil) Felipe Massa*	87
3	(Poland) Robert Kubica	75
4	(Finland) Kimi Räikkönen	69
5	(Germany) Nick Heidfeld	60

Constructors' Championship standings

Pos.	Constructor	Points
1	(Italy) Ferrari*	156
2	(United Kingdom) McLaren-Mercedes*	145
3	(Germany) BMW Sauber	135
4	(France) Renault	72
5	(Japan) Toyota	52

- Note: Only the top five positions are included for both sets of standings.
- Bold text and an asterisk indicates competitors who still had a theoretical chance of becoming World Champion.

== See also ==
- 2008 Chinese GP2 Asia Series round

Previous race: 2008 Japanese Grand Prix	FIA Formula One World Championship; 2008 season	Next race: 2008 Brazilian Grand Prix
Previous race: 2007 Chinese Grand Prix	Chinese Grand Prix	Next race: 2009 Chinese Grand Prix
