= Giorgio Mondini =

Swiss racing driver

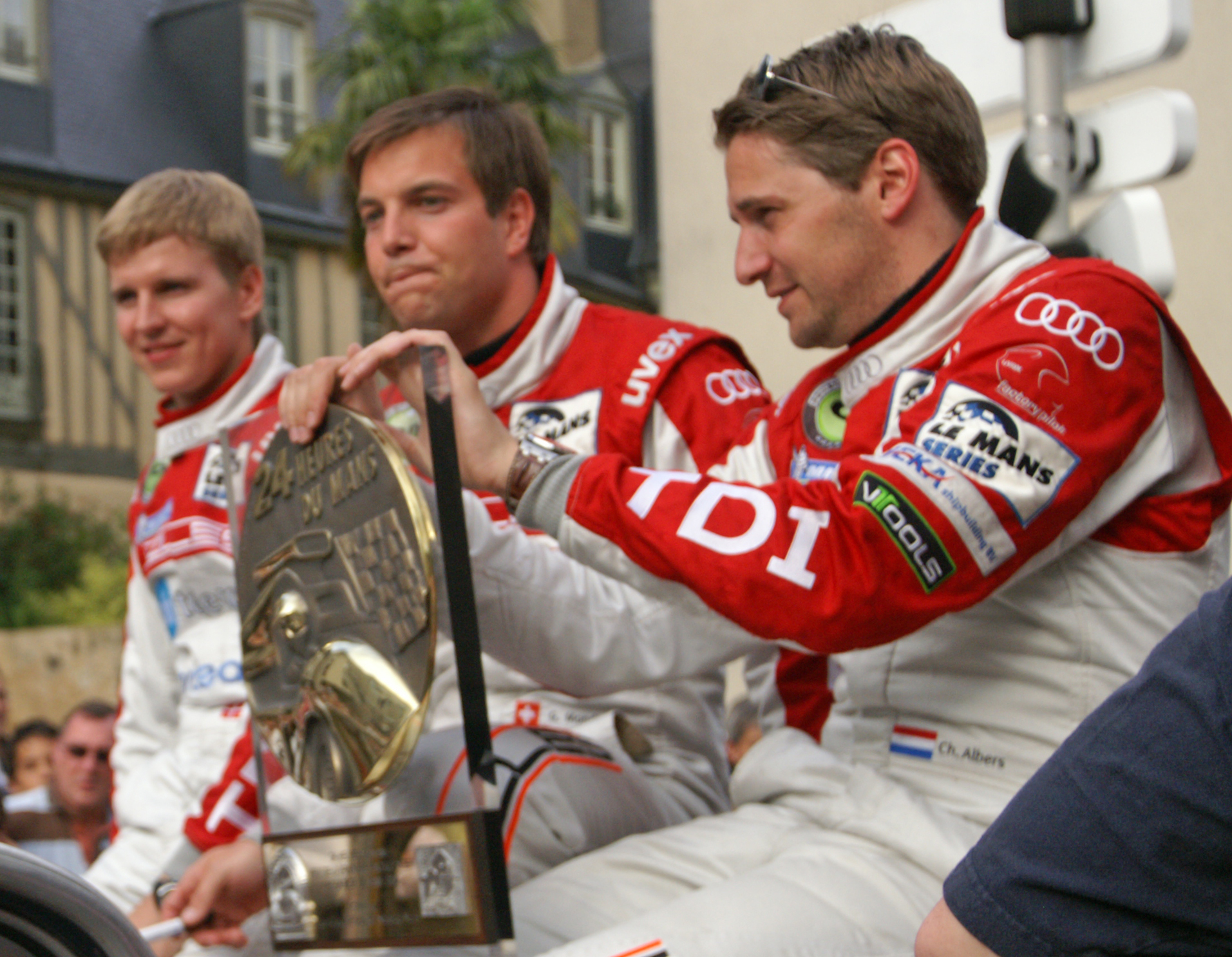
- Mondini (centre) at the 2009 24 Hours of Le Mans drivers' parade
- Nationality: Switzerland
- Born: July 19, 1980 (age 46) Genoa, Italy
- Categorisation: FIA Gold (until 2015); FIA Silver (2016–2025); FIA Bronze (2026–)

Previous series
- 2009 2005, 2007 2005-2006 2005–06 2005 2003-04 2001-02: Le Mans Series; Formula Renault 3.5; Formula One Testing; A1 Grand Prix; GP2 Series; Formula Renault V6 Eurocup; Formula Renault 2000 Eurocup

Championship titles
- 2004: Formula Renault V6 Eurocup Championship

24 Hours of Le Mans career
- Years: 2009
- Teams: Kolles
- Best finish: 9th
- Class wins: 0

Giorgio Mondini (born July 19, 1980) is an Italo-Swiss former racing driver who last competed in the 2018 European Le Mans Series. In 2004, he was champion of the Formula Renault V6 Eurocup series. He previously served as a Formula One test driver for Midland.

== Career ==
=== Formula Renault ===
Mondini began his competitive racing career at the age of 20, with no karting experience, when he came 26th in the Formula Renault 2000 Eurocup series with Jenzer Motorsport. In 2002, he made his way up to 17th place with the same team.

Mondini's first partnership with EuroInternational came when he graduated to the 2003 Formula Renault V6 Eurocup season, where he achieved 7th place. In 2004, he became champion with three wins, three pole positions and a total of eight podiums. The following year, he competed in start of the Formula Renault 3.5 Series before graduating to GP2. He returned for the season finale once the GP2 season finished, replacing Will Power at Carlin Motorsport, but retired from both races. He finished 24th in the standings.

=== GP2 Series ===
In 2005, Mondini moved to GP2 with DPR, replacing Ryan Sharp. However, he failed to score any points, and was not classified in the standings. He also competed for the Swiss A1GP team for the 2005-06 A1 Grand Prix season, teaming up with Neel Jani – the pair finished second.

=== Formula One ===
In December 2005, Mondini enjoyed his first taste of Formula One when he got behind the wheel of a Renault R25 as a reward for winning the Formula Renault V6 series.

In 2006, Mondini joined Midland F1 Racing as one of their third drivers, testing at nine of the 18 races.

On February 20, 2011, Mondini tested a F1 car for Hispania Racing in Barcelona.

=== Prototypes ===
Mondini switched to prototypes in 2009, competing in the Le Mans Series. The same year, he made his Le Mans debut, driving an Audi R10 TDI LMP1 for Kolles, joined in the car by Christian Bakkerud and Christijan Albers. The trio qualified thirteenth, starting on row seven alongside their sister car. They finished in ninth overall.

After a four-year break from racing, Mondini competed in the Italian Prototype Challenge in 2015. He began the season in the CN4 class with Audisio & Benvenuto, before switching to CN2 for race four, once again partnering with EuroInternational. He won nine of the remaining eleven races and took seven pole positions on his way to becoming champion.

In 2016, Mondini joined EuroInternational in the European Le Mans Series, competing in the LMP3 category. He came second in class in the 4 Hours of Imola alongside Marco Jacoboni and Andrea Roda, but the team retired from every other race they entered and finished 12th in the standings.

Mondini continued with the same team in 2017, and took his first class win at the 4 Hours of Red Bull Ring with Davide Uboldi after finishing second on the road, as the winning car was given a late drive-through penalty. With better fortune in the remaining races than the previous year, scoring points in three additional races, the team finished seventh in the standings.

Mondini returned to the series for 2018, now partnering Kay van Berlo. The season began with a third place in class in the 2018 4 Hours of Le Castellet, followed by a class win in the 4 Hours of Monza. The team once again finished seventh overall.

== Racing record ==
=== Career summary ===
Season	Series	Team	Races	Wins	Poles	F.Laps	Podiums	Points	Position
2001	Formula Renault 2000 Eurocup	Jenzer Motorsport	10	0	0	0	0	4	26th
2001	Formula Renault 2.0 Germany	Jenzer Motorsport	1	0	0	0	0	0	NC
2002	Formula Renault 2000 Eurocup	Jenzer Motorsport	9	0	0	0	0	12	17th
2002	Formula Renault 2.0 Italia	Jenzer Motorsport	1	0	0	0	0	0	NC
2002	Formula Renault 2.0 Switzerland	Jenzer Motorsport	2	1	0	0	2	55	10th
2003	Formula Renault V6 Eurocup	EuroInternational	18	0	0	0	0	109	7th
2003	Formula Renault 2.0 Fran-Am Winter World Championship	EuroInternational	4	0	0	1	2	204	5th
2004	Formula Renault V6 Eurocup	EuroInternational	19	3	3	1	8	293	**1st**
2005	GP2 Series	David Price Racing	10	0	0	0	0	0	NC
2005	Formula Renault 3.5 Series	EuroInternational	12	0	0	0	0	5	24th
2005	Formula One	Mild Seven Renault F1 Team	Test Driver						
2005-06	A1 Grand Prix	A1 Team Switzerland	4	0	0	0	0	121	**2nd***
2006	Formula One	Midland F1 Racing	Test Driver						
2007	Formula Renault 3.5 Series	EuroInternational	2	0	0	0	0	0	NC
2007	FIA GT Championship - GT1	Aston Martin Racing BMS	1	0	0	0	0	0	NC
2007	Spanish GT Championship - GTA	Playteam SRL	2	1	0	0	1	10	15th
2009	Le Mans Series - LMP1	Kodewa	3	0	0	0	0	2	19th
2009	24 Hours of Le Mans - LMP1	Kodewa	1	0	0	0	0	0	9th
2011	Formula One	HRT Formula 1 Team	Test Driver						
2011	2011 Group C Racing - C1	?	2	0	0	0	0	2	27th
2015	Italian Prototype Championship - CN4	Audisio & Benvenuto	3	1	2	3	1	20	4th
2015	Italian Prototype Championship - CN2	EuroInternational	11	8	6	8	11	162	**1st**
2015	V de V Challenge Endurance Proto - Scratch	CD Sport	1	0	0	0	0	0	NC
2016	European Le Mans Series - LMP3	EuroInternational	5	0	0	1	1	18	14th
2017	European Le Mans Series - LMP3	EuroInternational	6	1	0	0	1	49	7th
2018	European Le Mans Series - LMP3	EuroInternational	6	1	0	0	2	46.75	7th

* Includes points scored by other A1 Team Switzerland drivers

=== Complete Formula Renault 2.0 Eurocup results ===
(key) (Races in bold indicate pole position) (Races in italics indicate fastest lap)

Year	Entrant	1	2	3	4	5	6	7	8	9	10	DC	Points
2001	Jenzer Motorsport	MNZ; Ret	BRN; 22	MAG; 21	SIL; 13	ZOL; Ret	HUN; 14	A1R; Ret	NÜR; Ret	JAR; 9	EST; 13	26th	4
2002	Jenzer Motorsport	MAG; 25	SIL; 26	JAR; Ret	AND; 6	OSC; 19	SPA; 20	IMO; 11	DON; 13	EST; 10		17th	12

=== Complete Formula Renault V6 Eurocup results ===
(key) (Races in bold indicate pole position) (Races in italics indicate fastest lap)

Year	Entrant	1	2	3	4	5	6	7	8	9	10	11	12	13	14	15	16	17	18	19	DC	Points
2003	EuroInternational	CAT; 1; 10	CAT; 2; 5	MAG; 1; 8	MAG; 2 Ret	MON; Ret	DON; 1; 7	DON; 2; 7	SPA1; 5	SPA2; 1; 9	SPA2; 2; 7	AND; 1 Ret	AND; 2; 7	OSC; 1; 11	OSC; 2; 7	EST; 1; 10	EST; 2; 8	MNZ; 1; 4	MNZ; 2; 5		7th	109
2004	EuroInternational	MNZ; 1; 2	MNZ; 2 Ret	VAL; 1; 13	VAL; 2; 4	**MAG**; **1**; 1	**MAG**; **2**; 1	MON; 4	BRN; 1 Ret	BRN; 2; 3	DON; 1; 6	DON; 2; 9	SPA; 1; 2	SPA; 2; 4	**IMO**; **1**; 1	IMO; 2; 4	OSC; 1; 2	OSC; 2 Ret	DUB; 1; 3	DUB; 2; 5	1st	293

=== Complete Formula Renault 3.5 Series results ===
(key) (Races in bold indicate pole position) (Races in italics indicate fastest lap)

Year	Entrant	1	2	3	4	5	6	7	8	9	10	11	12	13	14	15	16	17	DC	Points
2005	EuroInternational	ZOL; 1; 16	ZOL; 2 Ret	MON; 1; 15	VAL; 1 Ret	VAL; 2; 6	LMS; 1 DNS	LMS; 2 DNS	BIL; 1	BIL; 2	OSC; 1	OSC; 2	DON; 1	DON; 2	EST; 1	EST; 2	MNZ; 1 Ret	MNZ; 2 Ret	24th	5
2007	EuroInternational	MNZ; 1	MNZ; 2	NÜR; 1	NÜR; 2	MON; 1	HUN; 1	HUN; 2	SPA; 1	SPA; 2	DON; 1	DON; 2	MAG; 1	MAG; 2	EST; 1	EST; 2	CAT; 1; 26	CAT; 2 Ret	40th	0

=== Complete GP2 Series results ===
(key) (Races in bold indicate pole position) (Races in italics indicate fastest lap)

Year	Entrant	1	2	3	4	5	6	7	8	9	10	11	12	13	14	15	16	17	18	19	20	21	22	23	DC	Points
2005	DPR	IMO; FEA	IMO; SPR	CAT; FEA	CAT; SPR	MON; FEA	NÜR; FEA	NÜR; SPR	MAG; FEA	MAG; SPR	SIL; FEA	SIL; SPR	HOC; FEA	HOC; SPR	HUN; FEA; Ret	HUN; SPR; Ret	IST; FEA; 13	IST; SPR; Ret	MNZ; FEA; Ret	MNZ; SPR; Ret	SPA; FEA; Ret	SPA; SPR; 21^{†}	BHR; FEA; 18	BHR; SPR; 22	26th	0

=== Complete A1 Grand Prix results ===
(key) (Races in bold indicate pole position) (Races in italics indicate fastest lap)

Year	Entrant	1	2	3	4	5	6	7	8	9	10	11	12	13	14	15	16	17	18	19	20	21	22	DC	Points	Ref
2005–06	Switzerland	GBR; SPR	GBR; FEA	GER; SPR	GER; FEA	POR; SPR	POR; FEA	AUS; SPR	AUS; FEA	MYS; SPR	MYS; FEA	UAE; SPR	UAE; FEA	RSA; SPR	RSA; FEA	IDN; SPR	IDN; FEA	MEX; SPR	MEX; FEA	USA; SPR; 16	USA; FEA; 13	CHN; SPR; Ret	CHN; FEA; Ret	**2nd**	**121**	

=== Complete Formula One participations ===
(key)

Year	Entrant	Chassis	Engine	1	2	3	4	5	6	7	8	9	10	11	12	13	14	15	16	17	18	WDC	Points
2006	Midland F1 Racing	Midland M16	Toyota V8	BHR	MAL; TD	AUS	SMR; TD	EUR	ESP; TD	MON; TD	GBR; TD	CAN; TD	USA; TD	FRA	GER	HUN	TUR; TD	ITA; TD	CHN	JPN	BRA	–	–

=== 24 Hours of Le Mans results ===
Year	Team	Co-Drivers	Car	Class	Laps	Pos.	Class Pos.
2009	(Germany) Kolles	(Denmark) Christian Bakkerud (Netherlands) Christijan Albers	Audi R10 TDI	LMP1	360	9th	9th
