= 2006 United States Grand Prix =

Coordinates: 39°47′42″N 86°14′05″W

Race 10 of 18 in the 2006 Formula One World Championship
← Previous race	Next race →
- The Indianapolis circuit

Race details
- Date: July 2, 2006
- Official name: 2006 Formula 1 United States Grand Prix
- Location: Indianapolis Motor Speedway; Speedway, Indiana
- Course: Permanent racing facility
- Course length: 4.195 km (2.606 miles)
- Distance: 73 laps, 306.016 km (190.238 miles)
- Weather: Sunny, hot

Pole position
Driver	(Germany) Michael Schumacher	Ferrari
- Time: 1:10.832

Fastest lap
Driver	(Germany) Michael Schumacher	Ferrari
- Time: 1:12.719 on lap 56

Podium
First	(Germany) Michael Schumacher	Ferrari
Second	(Brazil) Felipe Massa	Ferrari
Third	(Italy) Giancarlo Fisichella	Renault

The 2006 United States Grand Prix (formally the 2006 Formula 1 United States Grand Prix) was a Formula One motor race held at the Indianapolis Motor Speedway in Speedway, Indiana on July 2, 2006. It was the tenth race of the 2006 Formula One season and the 40th United States Grand Prix. The 73-lap race was won by Ferrari driver Michael Schumacher after starting from pole position. Teammate Felipe Massa finished second with Renault driver Giancarlo Fisichella third.

As a consequence of the race, Michael Schumacher scored his third win of the season, ending championship rival Fernando Alonso's run of four consecutive wins and reducing the 2005 World Drivers' Champion's lead in the points standings to 19 over the German. Schumacher's Ferrari teammate Felipe Massa made it a Ferrari one-two by finishing in second place as the Maranello-based team also reduced Renault's constructors points advantage to 26.

The race also marked the anniversary of the tyre controversy a year earlier, when 14 cars withdrew before the race began because of safety concerns about the supply of Michelin tyres provided to them – which had resulted in crashes during practice. This was also the last race for McLaren driver Juan Pablo Montoya, after he announced that he would be leaving to race in NASCAR in 2007. As of 2025, this is the last time a Colombian driver participated in a Formula One race.

This was the last race until the 2015 Malaysian Grand Prix that neither McLaren was classified.

== Background ==
The Grand Prix was contested by eleven teams with two drivers each. The teams (also known as Constructors) were Renault, McLaren, Ferrari, Toyota, Williams, Honda, Red Bull, BMW Sauber, MF1, Toro Rosso and Super Aguri.

Going into the race, Renault driver Fernando Alonso led the Drivers' Championship with 84 points, ahead of Michael Schumacher on 59 points and Kimi Räikkönen on 39 points. Giancarlo Fisichella was fourth with 37 points while Felipe Massa was fifth on 28 points. In the Constructors' Championship, Renault were leading with 121 points, Ferrari and McLaren were second and third with 87 and 65 points respectively, while Honda on 29 and BMW Sauber on 19 points contended for fourth place. Renault and Fernando Alonso had so far won the majority of the races, including victory in the preceding Canadian Grand Prix. Championship contenders Schumacher and Fisichella had each gained victories, and Räikkönen, Juan Pablo Montoya had each gained second-place finishes. Massa, Jenson Button, Ralf Schumacher and David Coulthard had achieved third place podium finishes.

== Practice ==
The bottom 6 teams in the 2005 Constructors' Championship and Super Aguri were entitled to run a third car in free practice on Friday. These drivers drove on Friday but did not compete in qualifying or the race.

Constructor	Driver
Williams-Cosworth	(Austria) Alexander Wurz
Honda	(United Kingdom) Anthony Davidson
Red Bull-Ferrari	(Netherlands) Robert Doornbos
BMW Sauber	(Poland) Robert Kubica
MF1-Toyota	(Switzerland) Giorgio Mondini
Toro Rosso-Cosworth	(Switzerland) Neel Jani
Super Aguri-Honda	(Japan) Sakon Yamamoto

Three practice sessions were held before the Sunday race – two on Friday, and one on Saturday. The Friday morning and afternoon sessions each lasted 90 minutes; the third session, on Saturday morning, lasted for an hour.

== Qualifying ==
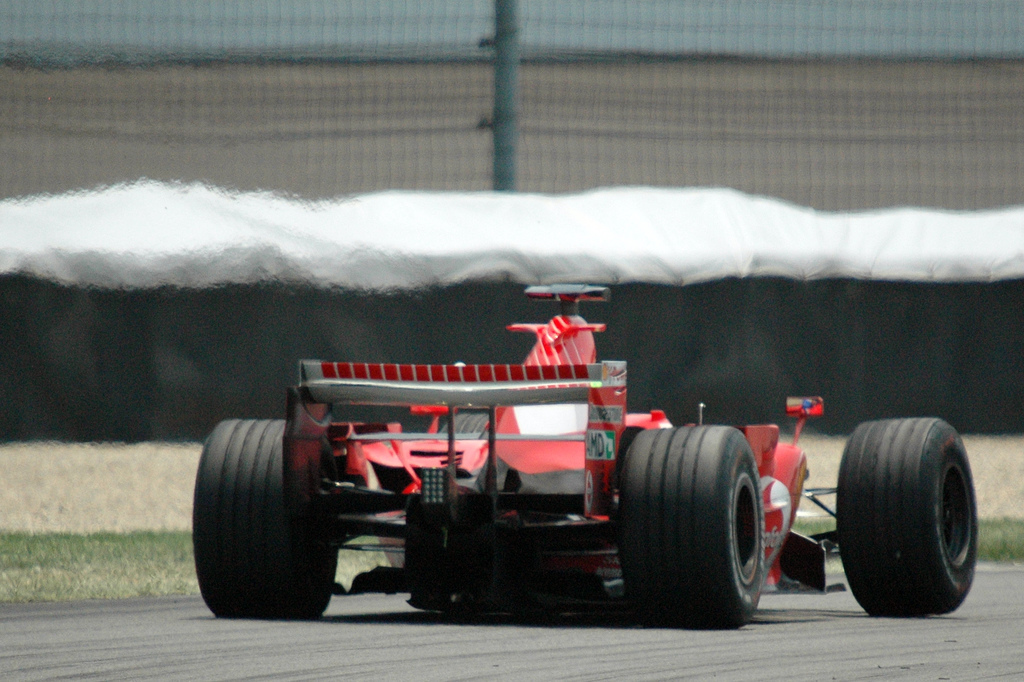
Scuderia Ferrari locked out the front row on the grid.

Saturday afternoon's qualifying session was divided into three parts. The first part ran for 15 minutes, and cars that finished the session 17th position or lower were eliminated from qualifying. The second part of the qualifying session lasted 15 minutes and eliminated cars that finished in positions 11 to 16. The final part of the qualifying session ran for 20 minutes which determined the positions from first to tenth, and decided pole position. Cars which failed to make the final session could refuel before the race, so ran lighter in those sessions.

Michael Schumacher and Felipe Massa earned Ferrari a front row lockout, ahead of Giancarlo Fisichella and Rubens Barrichello. Jarno Trulli's car was still being repaired when cars were sent to parc fermé; because of that, Trulli had to start from the pit lane. Nico Rosberg was penalised for ignoring a signal during the qualification session, requiring him to get his car weighed at the FIA garage. The FIA cancelled all his qualifying times, and he started from 21st position. Toro Rosso's Vitantonio Liuzzi had the engine of his car changed, and had to start from 20th position on the grid.

=== Qualifying classification ===
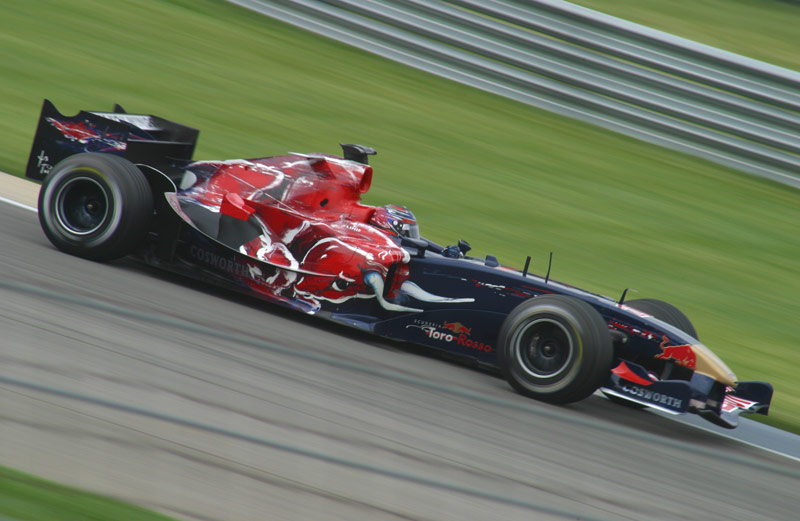
Scott Speed qualified in 13th at his home race.

Pos.	No.	Driver	Constructor	Q1	Q2	Q3	Grid
1	5	(Germany) Michael Schumacher	Ferrari	1:11.588	1:10.636	1:10.832	1
2	6	(Brazil) Felipe Massa	Ferrari	1:11.088	1:11.146	1:11.435	2
3	2	(Italy) Giancarlo Fisichella	Renault	1:12.287	1:11.200	1:11.920	3
4	11	(Brazil) Rubens Barrichello	Honda	1:12.156	1:11.263	1:12.109	4
5	1	(Spain) Fernando Alonso	Renault	1:12.416	1:11.877	1:12.449	5
6	17	(Canada) Jacques Villeneuve	BMW Sauber	1:12.114	1:11.724	1:12.479	6
7	12	(United Kingdom) Jenson Button	Honda	1:12.238	1:11.865	1:12.523	7
8	7	(Germany) Ralf Schumacher	Toyota	1:11.879	1:11.673	1:12.795	8
9	3	(Finland) Kimi Räikkönen	McLaren-Mercedes	1:12.777	1:12.135	1:13.174	9
10	16	(Germany) Nick Heidfeld	BMW Sauber	1:11.891	1:11.718	1:15.280	10
11	4	(Colombia) Juan Pablo Montoya	McLaren-Mercedes	1:12.477	1:12.150		11
12	9	(Australia) Mark Webber	Williams-Cosworth	1:12.935	1:12.292		12
13	21	(United States) Scott Speed	Toro Rosso-Cosworth	1:13.167	1:12.792		13
14	19	(Netherlands) Christijan Albers	MF1-Toyota	1:12.711	1:12.854		14
15	18	(Portugal) Tiago Monteiro	MF1-Toyota	1:12.627	1:12.864		15
16	15	(Austria) Christian Klien	Red Bull-Ferrari	1:12.773	1:12.925		16
17	14	(United Kingdom) David Coulthard	Red Bull-Ferrari	1:13.180			17
18	22	(Japan) Takuma Sato	Super Aguri-Honda	1:13.496			18
19	10	(Germany) Nico Rosberg	Williams-Cosworth	1:13.506			21^{1}
20	8	(Italy) Jarno Trulli	Toyota	1:13.787			PL^{2}
21	20	(Italy) Vitantonio Liuzzi	Toro Rosso-Cosworth	1:14.041			20^{3}
22	23	(France) Franck Montagny	Super Aguri-Honda	1:16.036			19

Notes

- ^1 – Nico Rosberg was retroactively excluded from the results of qualifying for ignoring an instruction from the officials.
- ^2 – Jarno Trulli was to start the race from the pitlane after changing his suspension outside of parc fermé conditions.
- ^3 – Vitantonio Liuzzi received a 10-place grid penalty for an engine change.

== Race ==
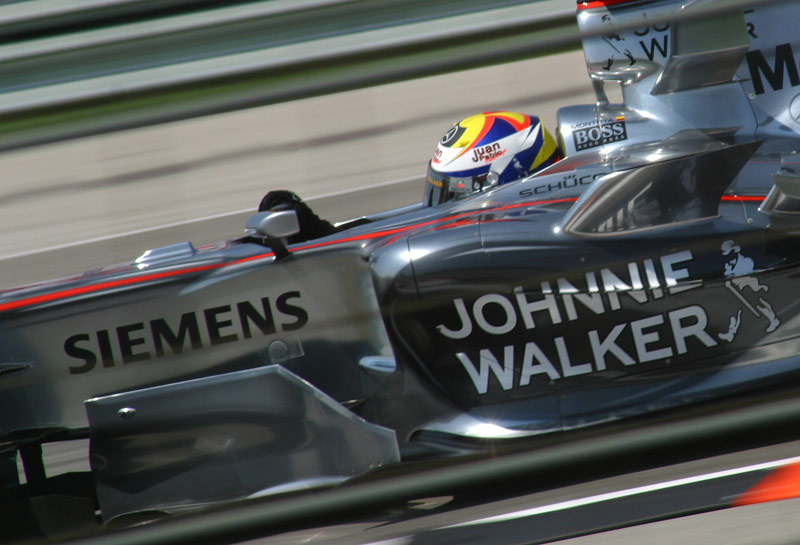
Juan Pablo Montoya was involved in an incident at the first corner of the race.

The race started with two big accidents at the first corner, which eliminated 7 cars. At Turn 1, Mark Webber collided with Christian Klien, who then spun around and was taken out by Franck Montagny. In Turn 2, Juan Pablo Montoya nudged his teammate Kimi Räikkönen into a spin. Montoya then clouted Jenson Button whose front right tyre got caught by BMW Sauber's Nick Heidfeld who was launched into a triple barrel roll; Montoya also clipped Scuderia Toro Rosso's Scott Speed in the incident. None of the drivers were injured. After that, the order stayed the same at the front, the only action being a battle at the back between David Coulthard, Nico Rosberg, and Vitantonio Liuzzi. Rosberg lost out and was the only finishing driver not to score in the race, with Liuzzi gaining Toro Rosso's first ever point. Montoya departed McLaren days after the race, announcing his move to NASCAR for the 2007 season for Chip Ganassi Racing. Michael Schumacher led home teammate Felipe Massa for a Ferrari one-two finish - the Maranello team's first of the season. This was Schumacher's fifth overall victory in the United States Grand Prix and his fourth consecutive win at this particular event. Giancarlo Fisichella came home a distant third in his Renault with his teammate and championship leader Fernando Alonso 5th behind the Toyota of Jarno Trulli.

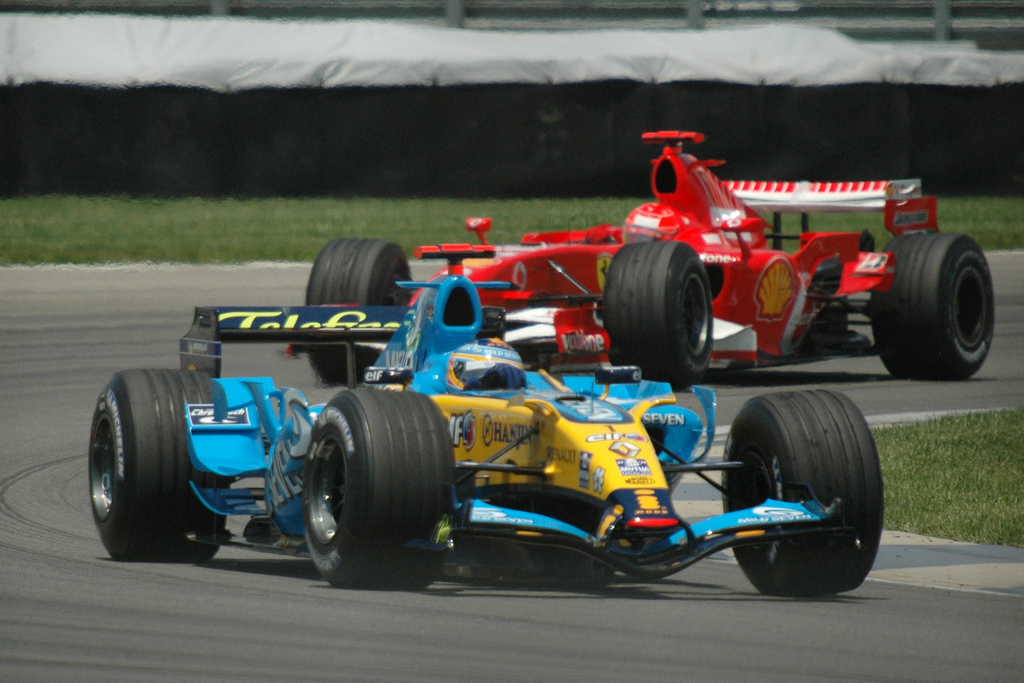
Fernando Alonso in front of race winner Michael Schumacher during the race

=== Race classification ===
Pos.	No.	Driver	Constructor	Tyre	Laps	Time/Retired	Grid	Points
1	5	(Germany) Michael Schumacher	Ferrari	B	73	1:34:35.199	1	10
2	6	(Brazil) Felipe Massa	Ferrari	B	73	+7.984	2	8
3	2	(Italy) Giancarlo Fisichella	Renault	MI	73	+16.595	3	6
4	8	(Italy) Jarno Trulli	Toyota	B	73	+23.604	PL^{4}	5
5	1	(Spain) Fernando Alonso	Renault	MI	73	+28.410	5	4
6	11	(Brazil) Rubens Barrichello	Honda	MI	73	+36.513	4	3
7	14	(United Kingdom) David Coulthard	Red Bull-Ferrari	MI	72	+1 lap	17	2
8	20	(Italy) Vitantonio Liuzzi	Toro Rosso-Cosworth	MI	72	+1 lap	20	1
9	10	(Germany) Nico Rosberg	Williams-Cosworth	B	72	+1 lap	21	
Ret	7	(Germany) Ralf Schumacher	Toyota	B	62	Wheel bearing	8	
Ret	19	(Netherlands) Christijan Albers	MF1-Toyota	B	37	Transmission	14	
Ret	17	(Canada) Jacques Villeneuve	BMW Sauber	MI	23	Engine	6	
Ret	18	(Portugal) Tiago Monteiro	MF1-Toyota	B	9	Collision damage	15	
Ret	22	(Japan) Takuma Sato	Super Aguri-Honda	B	6	Collision	18	
Ret	12	(United Kingdom) Jenson Button	Honda	MI	3	Collision damage	7	
Ret	3	(Finland) Kimi Räikkönen	McLaren-Mercedes	MI	0	Collision	9	
Ret	16	(Germany) Nick Heidfeld	BMW Sauber	MI	0	Collision	10	
Ret	4	(Colombia) Juan Pablo Montoya	McLaren-Mercedes	MI	0	Collision	11	
Ret	9	(Australia) Mark Webber	Williams-Cosworth	B	0	Collision	12	
Ret	21	(United States) Scott Speed	Toro Rosso-Cosworth	MI	0	Collision	13	
Ret	15	(Austria) Christian Klien	Red Bull-Ferrari	MI	0	Collision	16	
Ret	23	(France) Franck Montagny	Super Aguri-Honda	B	0	Collision	19	

Notes

- ^4 – Jarno Trulli started the race from the pitlane.

== Championship standings after the race ==
Drivers' Championship standings

	Pos.	Driver	Points
	1	(Spain) Fernando Alonso	88
	2	(Germany) Michael Schumacher	69
1	3	(Italy) Giancarlo Fisichella	43
1	4	(Finland) Kimi Räikkönen	39
	5	(Brazil) Felipe Massa	36

Constructors' Championship standings

Pos.	Constructor	Points
1	(France) Renault	131
2	(Italy) Ferrari	105
3	(United Kingdom) McLaren-Mercedes	65
4	(Japan) Honda	32
5	(Germany) BMW Sauber	19

- Note: Only the top five positions are included for both sets of standings.

Previous race: 2006 Canadian Grand Prix	FIA Formula One World Championship; 2006 season	Next race: 2006 French Grand Prix
Previous race: 2005 United States Grand Prix	United States Grand Prix	Next race: 2007 United States Grand Prix
