= 2006 British Grand Prix =

Coordinates: 52°04′43″N 1°01′01″W

Race 8 of 18 in the 2006 Formula One World Championship
← Previous race	Next race →
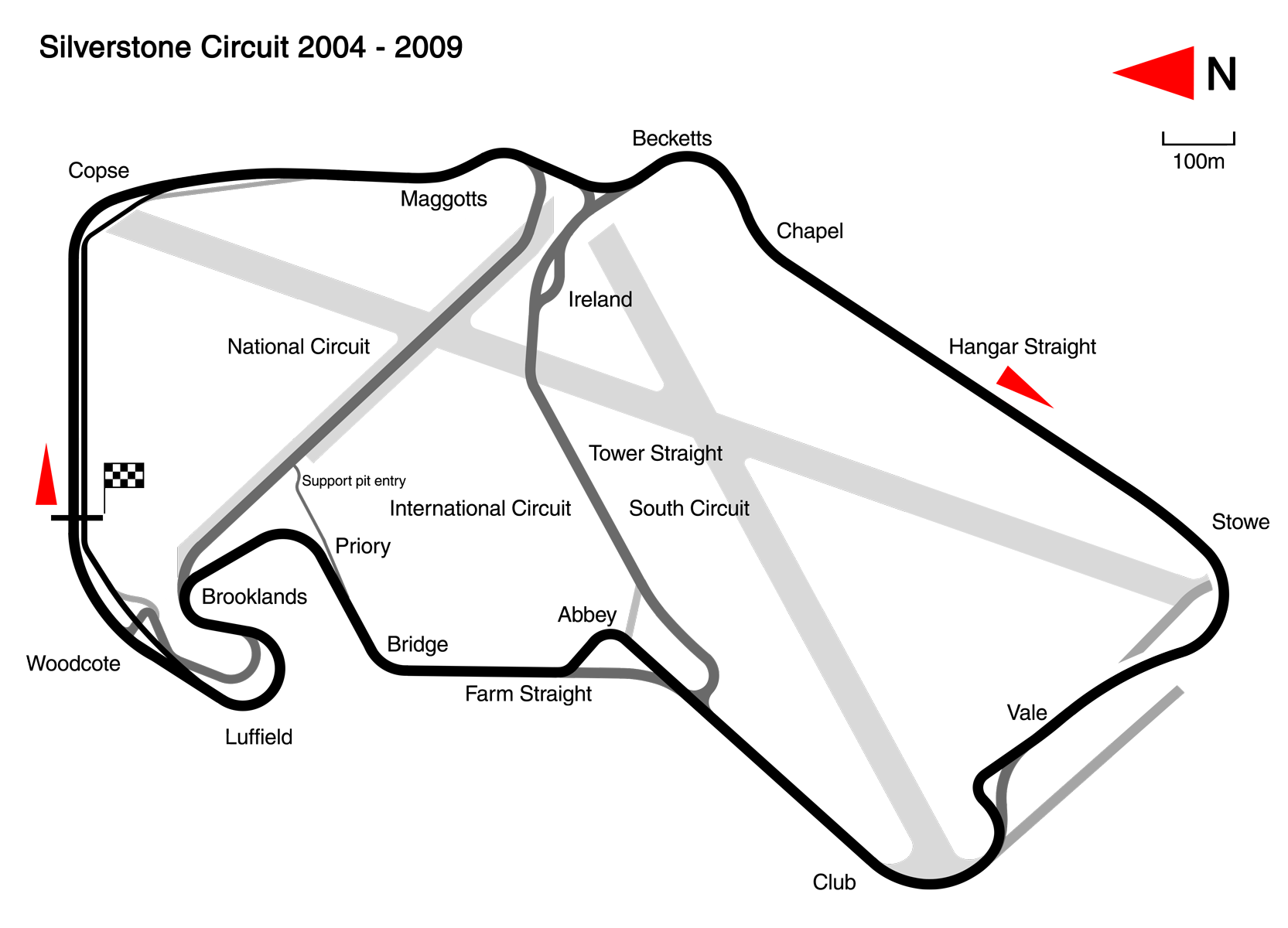
- Silverstone Circuit in 2006

Race details
- Date: 11 June 2006
- Official name: 2006 Formula 1 Foster's British Grand Prix
- Location: Silverstone Circuit, Silverstone, Northamptonshire and Buckinghamshire, England
- Course: Permanent Road Facility
- Course length: 5.141 km (3.194 miles)
- Distance: 60 laps, 308.355 km (191.603 miles)
- Weather: Sunny, 27°C

Pole position
Driver	(Spain) Fernando Alonso	Renault
- Time: 1:20.253

Fastest lap
Driver	(Spain) Fernando Alonso	Renault
- Time: 1:21.599 on lap 21

Podium
First	(Spain) Fernando Alonso	Renault
Second	(Germany) Michael Schumacher	Ferrari
Third	(Finland) Kimi Räikkönen	McLaren-Mercedes

The 2006 British Grand Prix (officially the 2006 Formula 1 Foster's British Grand Prix) was a Formula One motor race held on 11 June 2006 at the Silverstone Circuit. The 60-lap race was the eighth round of the 2006 Formula One season.

== Background ==
The event was held at the Silverstone Circuit in Northamptonshire for the 41st time in the circuit's history. The Grand Prix was the eighth round of the 2006 Formula One World Championship and the 52nd running of the British Grand Prix as a round of the Formula One World Championship.

Ticket sales were rather slow, because the race was scheduled far earlier than normal and local Jenson Button had had a rather poor 2005 season. Also, the weekend clashed with England's first World Cup match.

This race featured the first ever pit stop to involve a woman. During a Midland F1 pit stop for Tiago Monteiro, ITV-F1's then pit lane reporter Louise Goodman was the left rear tyre changer.

=== Championship standings before the race ===
Renault's Fernando Alonso was leading the Drivers' Championship with 64 points, ahead of Ferrari's Michael Schumacher with 43 and both Renault teammate Giancarlo Fisichella and McLaren driver with 27. In the Constructors' Championship, Renault topped the standings with 91 points, ahead of Ferrari (63) and McLaren (50).

== Practice ==
Three practice sessions were held before the Sunday race: two on Friday, both lasting 90 minutes, and one on Saturday for 60 minutes. The first session was led by Williams's third driver Alexander Wurz, the second by BMW Sauber's third driver Robert Kubica and the third, arguably the most representative session, by Michael Schumacher in the Ferrari.

=== Friday drivers ===
The bottom 6 teams in the 2005 Constructors' Championship and Super Aguri were entitled to run a third car in free practice on Friday. These drivers drove on Friday but did not compete in qualifying or the race.

Constructor	Nat	Driver
Williams-Cosworth	(Austria)	Alexander Wurz
Honda	(United Kingdom)	Anthony Davidson
Red Bull-Ferrari	(Netherlands)	Robert Doornbos
BMW Sauber	(Poland)	Robert Kubica
MF1-Toyota	(Switzerland)	Giorgio Mondini
Toro Rosso-Cosworth	(Switzerland)	Neel Jani
Super Aguri-Honda	(Japan)	Sakon Yamamoto

== Qualifying ==
Saturday afternoon's qualifying session was divided into three parts. The first part ran for 15 minutes, and cars that finished the session 17th position or lower were eliminated from qualifying. The second part of the qualifying session lasted 15 minutes and eliminated cars that finished in positions 11 to 16. The final part of the qualifying session ran for 20 minutes which determined the positions from first to tenth, and decided pole position. Cars which failed to make the final session could refuel before the race, so ran lighter in those sessions.

Fernando Alonso became the first Spanish driver and the youngest driver ever (24 years and 317 days) to get a hat trick (pole position, winning and fastest lap in the same race). He fell one lap short of clinching a Grand Chelem (complementing the hat trick by leading every lap). He would finally achieve this at the 2010 Singapore Grand Prix.

Pos.	No.	Driver	Constructor	Q1	Q2	Q3	Grid
1	1	(Spain) Fernando Alonso	Renault	1:21.018	1:20.271	1:20.253	1
2	3	(Finland) Kimi Räikkönen	McLaren-Mercedes	1:21.648	1:20.497	1:20.397	2
3	5	(Germany) Michael Schumacher	Ferrari	1:22.096	1:20.659	1:20.574	3
4	6	(Brazil) Felipe Massa	Ferrari	1:21.647	1:20.846	1:20.764	4
5	2	(Italy) Giancarlo Fisichella	Renault	1:22.411	1:20.594	1:20.919	5
6	11	(Brazil) Rubens Barrichello	Honda	1:22.965	1:20.929	1:20.943	6
7	7	(Germany) Ralf Schumacher	Toyota	1:22.886	1:21.043	1:21.073	7
8	4	(Colombia) Juan Pablo Montoya	McLaren-Mercedes	1:22.169	1:20.816	1:21.107	8
9	16	(Germany) Nick Heidfeld	BMW Sauber	1:21.670	1:20.629	1:21.329	9
10	17	(Canada) Jacques Villeneuve	BMW Sauber	1:21.637	1:20.672	1:21.599	10
11	14	(United Kingdom) David Coulthard	Red Bull-Ferrari	1:22.424	1:21.442		11
12	10	(Germany) Nico Rosberg	Williams-Cosworth	1:23.083	1:21.567		12
13	20	(Italy) Vitantonio Liuzzi	Toro Rosso-Cosworth	1:22.685	1:21.699		13
14	15	(Austria) Christian Klien	Red Bull-Ferrari	1:22.773	1:21.990		14
15	21	(United States) Scott Speed	Toro Rosso-Cosworth	1:22.541	1:22.076		15
16	18	(Portugal) Tiago Monteiro	MF1-Toyota	1:22.860	1:22.207		16
17	9	(Australia) Mark Webber	Williams-Cosworth	1:23.129			17
18	19	(Netherlands) Christijan Albers	MF1-Toyota	1:23.210			18
19	12	(United Kingdom) Jenson Button	Honda	1:23.247			19
20	22	(Japan) Takuma Sato	Super Aguri-Honda	1:26.158			21^{1}
21	23	(France) Franck Montagny	Super Aguri-Honda	1:26.316			20
22	8	(Italy) Jarno Trulli	Toyota	No time^{2}			22

Notes

- ^1 – Takuma Sato was handed a 10 place grid penalty following a chassis and engine change after the Saturday morning practice session.
- ^2 – Jarno Trulli did not get any time in the first part of Q1 as a due to an engine failure.

== Race ==
The race was held on 11 June 2006 and was run for 60 laps.

=== Race report ===
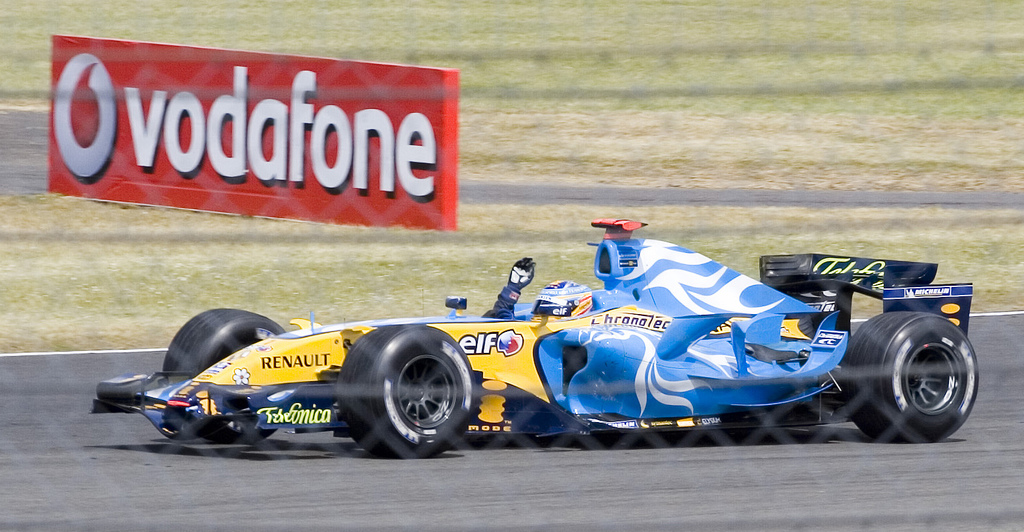
Fernando Alonso took pole position, fastest lap, and race victory, leading every lap of the race except one.

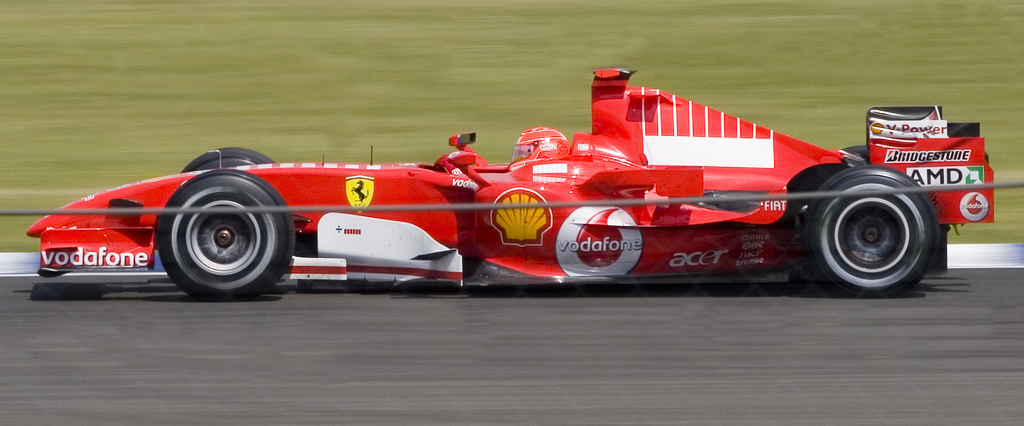
Michael Schumacher finished second, just under 14 seconds behind Fernando Alonso

The start brought no changes in the order at the front, but further back, Scott Speed pushed Ralf Schumacher's Toyota right in the path of Mark Webber. Schumacher and Webber retired on the spot, while Speed crawled to the pits and drove straight into the garage at the end of the lap. The safety car was deployed for three laps.

At the restart, Michael Schumacher challenged Kimi Räikkönen for second, but the Finn held on. Alonso gradually built a gap of three seconds to Raikkonen, and on lap 18, Schumacher was the first to pit. The championship leader looked to have the win secured, especially when his lead had grown to 13 seconds after the first round of stops.

Schumacher managed to leapfrog Räikkönen at the second round of stops, but never managed to get closer to his rival in the Renault. Räikkönen slowly fell into the clutches of Giancarlo Fisichella but held on to his podium finish.

Juan Pablo Montoya and Jacques Villeneuve finished sixth and eighth, respectively, and scored the final World Championship points of their careers.

=== Race classification ===
Pos.	No.	Driver	Constructor	Tyre	Laps	Time/Retired	Grid	Points
1	1	(Spain) Fernando Alonso	Renault	MI	60	1:25:51.927	1	10
2	5	(Germany) Michael Schumacher	Ferrari	B	60	+13.951	3	8
3	3	(Finland) Kimi Räikkönen	McLaren-Mercedes	MI	60	+18.672	2	6
4	2	(Italy) Giancarlo Fisichella	Renault	MI	60	+19.976	5	5
5	6	(Brazil) Felipe Massa	Ferrari	B	60	+31.559	4	4
6	4	(Colombia) Juan Pablo Montoya	McLaren-Mercedes	MI	60	+1:04.769	8	3
7	16	(Germany) Nick Heidfeld	BMW Sauber	MI	60	+1:14.594	9	2
8	17	(Canada) Jacques Villeneuve	BMW Sauber	MI	60	+1:18.299	10	1
9	10	(Germany) Nico Rosberg	Williams-Cosworth	B	60	+1:19.008	12	
10	11	(Brazil) Rubens Barrichello	Honda	MI	59	+1 lap	6	
11	8	(Italy) Jarno Trulli	Toyota	B	59	+1 lap	22	
12	14	(United Kingdom) David Coulthard	Red Bull-Ferrari	MI	59	+1 lap	11	
13	20	(Italy) Vitantonio Liuzzi	Toro Rosso-Cosworth	MI	59	+1 lap	13	
14	15	(Austria) Christian Klien	Red Bull-Ferrari	MI	59	+1 lap	14	
15	19	(Netherlands) Christijan Albers	MF1-Toyota	B	59	+1 lap	18	
16	18	(Portugal) Tiago Monteiro	MF1-Toyota	B	58	+2 laps	16	
17	22	(Japan) Takuma Sato	Super Aguri-Honda	B	57	+3 laps	21	
18	23	(France) Franck Montagny	Super Aguri-Honda	B	57	+3 laps	20	
Ret	12	(United Kingdom) Jenson Button	Honda	MI	8	Oil leak	19	
Ret	21	(United States) Scott Speed	Toro Rosso-Cosworth	MI	1	Collision damage	15	
Ret	7	(Germany) Ralf Schumacher	Toyota	B	0	Collision	7	
Ret	9	(Australia) Mark Webber	Williams-Cosworth	B	0	Collision	17	

== Championship standings after the race ==
Drivers' Championship standings

	Pos.	Driver	Points
	1	(Spain) Fernando Alonso	74
	2	(Germany) Michael Schumacher	51
1	3	(Finland) Kimi Räikkönen	33
1	4	(Italy) Giancarlo Fisichella	32
	5	(Colombia) Juan Pablo Montoya	26

Constructors' Championship standings

Pos.	Constructor	Points
1	(France) Renault	106
2	(Italy) Ferrari	75
3	(United Kingdom) McLaren-Mercedes	59
4	(Japan) Honda	29
5	(Germany) BMW Sauber	17

- Note: Only the top five positions are included for both sets of standings.

== See also ==
- 2006 Silverstone GP2 Series round

Previous race: 2006 Monaco Grand Prix	FIA Formula One World Championship; 2006 season	Next race: 2006 Canadian Grand Prix
Previous race: 2005 British Grand Prix	British Grand Prix	Next race: 2007 British Grand Prix
