= Midland F1 Racing =

Former Russian Formula One constructor

MF1
- Full name: Spyker MF1 Racing (1–22 October 2006); Midland F1 Racing (12 March-10 September 2006)
- Base: Silverstone, Northamptonshire, United Kingdom
- Founder(s): Alex Shnaider
- Noted staff: Colin Kolles; James Key
- Noted drivers: (Portugal) Tiago Monteiro (Netherlands) Christijan Albers
- Previous name: Jordan Grand Prix
- Next name: Spyker F1 Team

Formula One World Championship career
- First entry: 2006 Bahrain Grand Prix
- Races entered: 18
- Engines: Toyota
- Constructors' Championships: 0
- Drivers' Championships: 0
- Race victories: 0
- Pole positions: 0
- Fastest laps: 0
- Final entry: 2006 Brazilian Grand Prix

Midland F1 Racing (also known as MF1 Racing, or simply as MF1, or Midland) was a Formula One constructor and racing team which competed in the 2006 Formula One World Championship with drivers Christijan Albers and Tiago Monteiro. The team was created by the renaming of Jordan Grand Prix after its purchase by Canadian businessman, and owner of the Midland Group, Alex Shnaider. The team was licensed as the first Russian Formula One team, although it continued to be based in the United Kingdom, at Jordan's Silverstone factory. Towards the end of the 2006 season, the team was sold to Spyker Cars N.V.; the team raced in its last three Grands Prix under the official name Spyker MF1 Racing. In 2007, the team competed as Spyker F1, and in 2008 was sold to Indian businessman Vijay Mallya and was renamed to Force India.

== 2005 purchase of Jordan ==
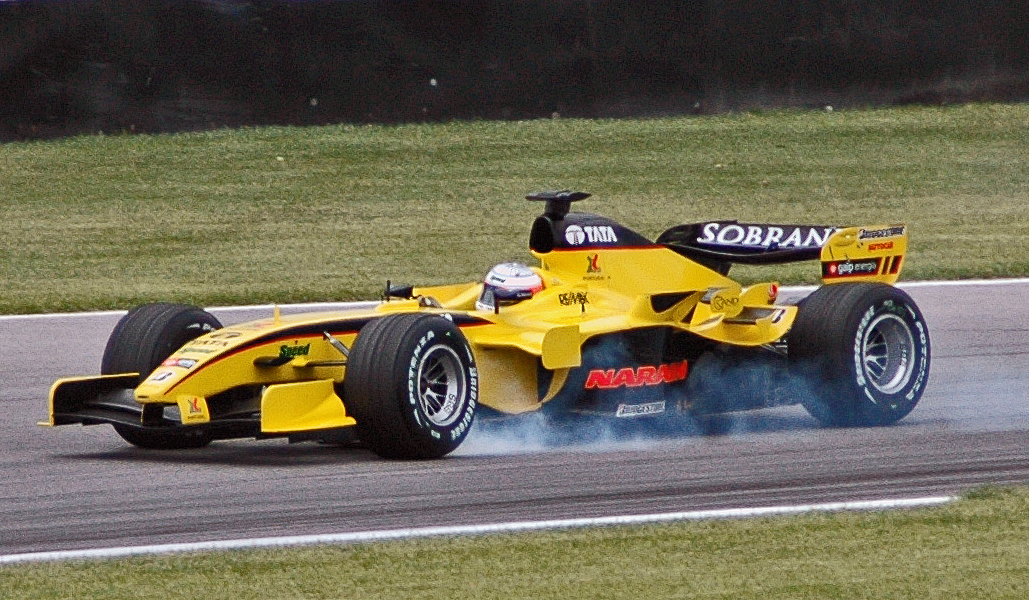
Narain Karthikeyan driving for Midland owned Jordan at the 2005 United States Grand Prix.

The Midland Group's interest in Formula One involvement began in 2004 when they confirmed plans to create a team to race in the 2006 season. Although they were initially linked with creating a new unit or purchasing Jaguar, the group instead signed a deal to buy the Jordan team from Eddie Jordan prior to the 2005 season, for a sum of $60 million. As a result, the team would be a legal continuation of Jordan and not a new entity subject to Formula One's $48 million entry bond. It also allowed Midland to claim the television revenue generated by Jordan's subsequent ninth place in the constructors' championship.

The team retained Jordan's name for the 2005 season but struggled at the back of the grid with rookie drivers Narain Karthikeyan and Tiago Monteiro. The highlights of the season were Monteiro's third-place finish at the US Grand Prix (in which only six cars competed due to problems with Michelin tyres), Monteiro managed an excellent eighth place at Spa in wet conditions to give the Jordan name its last point and his lengthy streak of consecutive finishes, which underlined the car's reliability.

Some media reports at this time began to speculate that Midland were unhappy with their purchase and looking to offload Jordan even before the team entered under its own name in 2006. Team principal Trevor Carlin quit the team after seven races, and chief engineer and designer Mark Smith before the end of the season. There were consistent reports that the team was linked with a buy-out by former Formula One driver Eddie Irvine.

== 2006 Formula One season ==
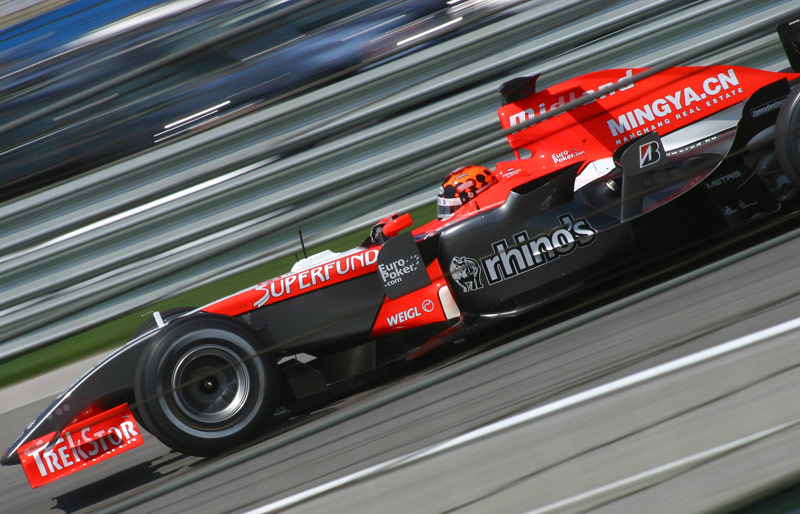
Christijan Albers at the 2006 United States Grand Prix.

The name of the team was changed to MF1 Racing for the 2006 Formula One season. In the UK a joke emerged regarding this short form being written in the same way as economy furniture manufacturer MFI. Over the winter Russian driver Roman Rusinov tested a new car, the Midland M16 with a new livery (red, white and black to reflect Midland Group's corporate colours) and Toyota leased customer engines. MotoGP motorcyclist Max Biaggi also had a test in the car at Silverstone in January. Italian racing car constructor Dallara had originally been contracted to develop the M16, however the agreement was discontinued during the design process after a disappointing contribution from the Italian manufacturer. The senior management subsequently placed its faith in the incumbent design team, promoting former head of vehicle science James Key to the role of technical director towards the end of the 2005 season.

Shnaider had been insistent that Midland intended to field Formula One's first Russian driver - although Russian drivers had tested in the past, mainly for the Minardi team, none had ever raced in a Grand Prix - but instead signed Dutchman Christijan Albers from Minardi, and retained Portuguese driver Tiago Monteiro. The team had previously failed in a bid to sign Takuma Sato.

During the team's very short time in F1, they used three drivers on the Fridays of Grands Prix:

- Markus Winkelhock at Sakhir, Melbourne, Hockenheim and Hungaroring
- Giorgio Mondini at Sepang, Imola, Barcelona, Monte Carlo, Silverstone, Montreal, Indianapolis, Istanbul and Monza
- Adrian Sutil at Nürburgring and Magny-Cours

During the last three races, as Spyker MF1 Racing, the team used the following test drivers:

- Alexandre Prémat at Shanghai
- Adrian Sutil at Suzuka
- E. J. Viso at Interlagos

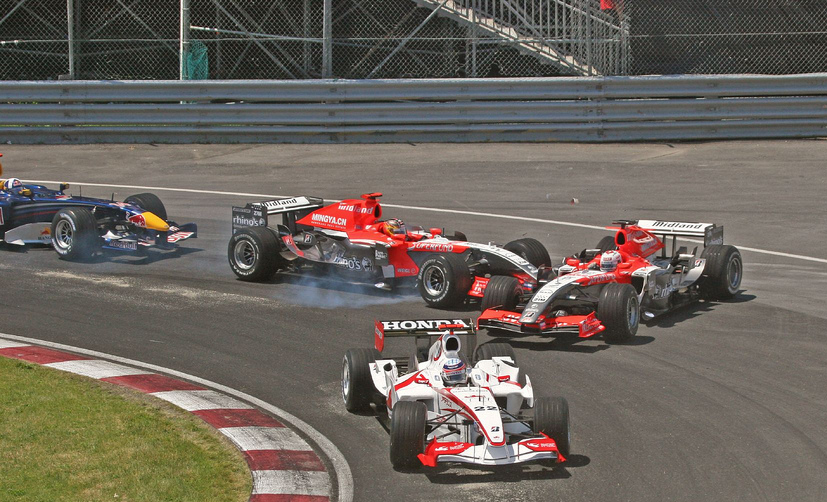
Midland's two drivers collide on the first lap of the 2006 Canadian Grand Prix.

As the 2006 season went on, the team went from running ahead of Super Aguri but behind everyone else, to consistently sparring with other midfield teams such as Red Bull Racing and Scuderia Toro Rosso although it only ever finished ahead of crippled cars, Super Aguri and the occasional Toro Rosso. Much of that progress was down to tyre development from Bridgestone coupled with significant improvements in aerodynamics and handling (overseen by Simon Phillips and Richard Frith respectively). The improved performance saw the team begin to make it into the second qualifying session on an occasional basis - eight times out of a possible 36 overall - with a best qualifying position of 14th.

Unfortunately this increased mid-season performance did not translate into hard results as the team were involved in a number of first-lap accidents, notably at Monaco, Indianapolis and Montreal, and the team was disqualified from the German Grand Prix for running a flexible wing in contravention of the sport's technical regulations.

The team went from being around four seconds off the pace per lap in 2005 to around 2 seconds per lap at the time of its sale to Spyker cars in September 2006.

== Sale of the team ==
The Spyker MF1 Racing logo.

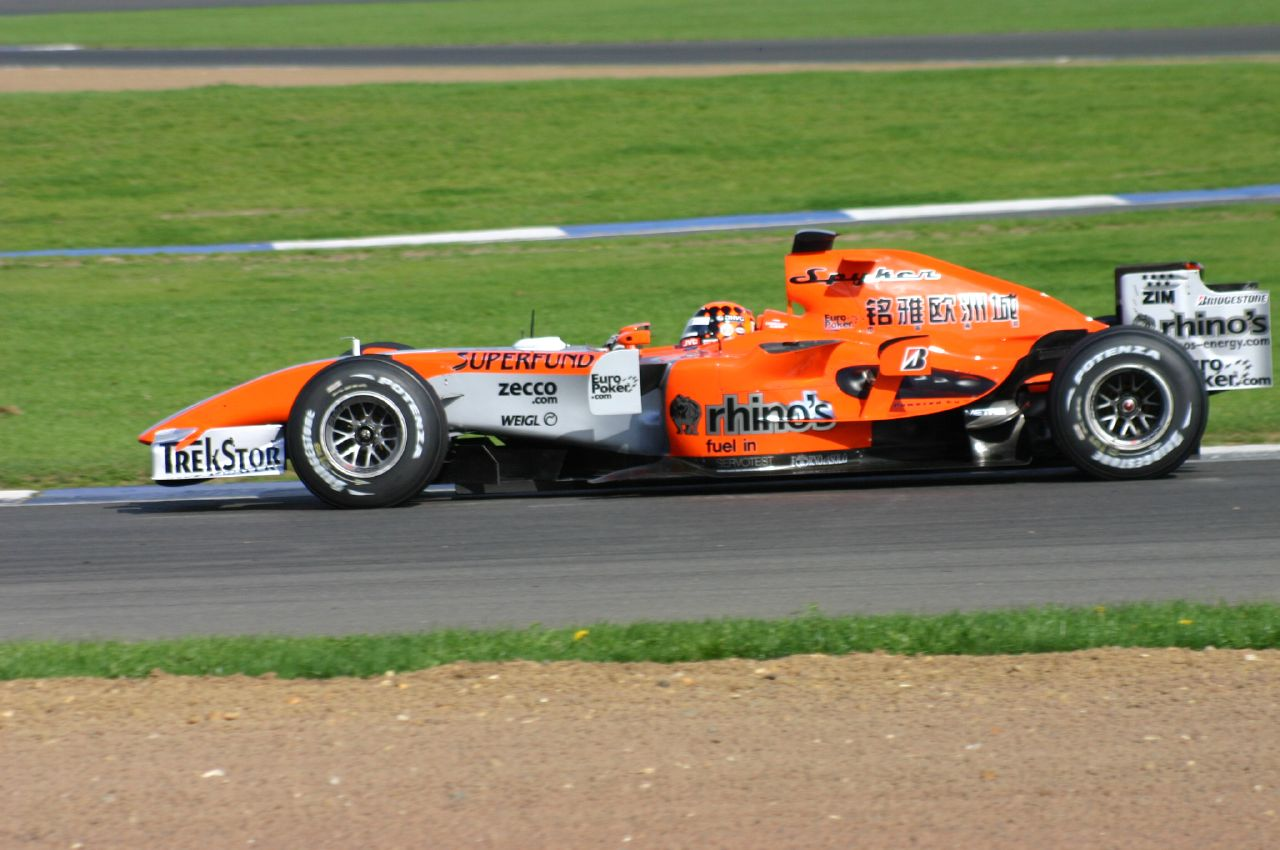
Christijan Albers driving a 2006 M16 in the late season Spyker livery.

Rumours had been floating about in the paddock throughout the mid-season about the possible sale of the team, less than two years after Shnaider originally bought it from Eddie Jordan. Reports suggested a price tag of $128 million, and that Shnaider was seriously considering the possibility of the sale. Formula One teams had become more valuable, because no more teams could enter after 2008, with the maximum of 12 places already filled.

On 9 September 2006, it was revealed that the team was sold to Spyker Cars. Spyker paid $106.6 million for the team. On 10 September ITV Sport said that Shnaider was no longer involved in the team since the announcement of the sale. Colin Kolles remained as team principal, while Michiel Mol became the new Director of F1 racing and member of the Spyker board and Mike Gascoyne joined as Chief Designer at the end of the season. The cars appeared in a revised livery for the final three races of 2006. Name changes are not allowed mid-season, but Spyker were legitimately able to name themselves as the team's title sponsor, so the team raced in its last three Grands Prix under the official name "Spyker MF1 Racing". In 2007, the team competed as Spyker F1. From 2008 onwards, the team competed as Force India.

== Complete Formula One results ==
(key) (results in bold indicate pole position)

Year	Chassis	Engine	Tyres	Drivers	1	2	3	4	5	6	7	8	9	10	11	12	13	14	15	16	17	18	Points	WCC
2006	M16	Toyota RVX-06 2.4 V8	**B**		BHR	MAL	AUS	SMR	EUR	ESP	MON	GBR	CAN	USA	FRA	GER	HUN	TUR	ITA	CHN	JPN	BRA	0	10th
2006	M16	Toyota RVX-06 2.4 V8	**B**	(Portugal) Tiago Monteiro	17	13	Ret	16	12	16	15	16	14	Ret	Ret	DSQ	9	Ret	Ret	Ret	16	15	0	10th
2006	M16	Toyota RVX-06 2.4 V8	**B**	(Netherlands) Christijan Albers	Ret	12	11	Ret	13	Ret	12	15	Ret	Ret	15	DSQ	10	Ret	17	15	Ret	14	0	10th
Sources:

- The team was disqualified from the German Grand Prix for running a flexible wing in contravention of the sport's technical regulations.
