= 2006 Canadian Grand Prix =

Coordinates: 39°47′42″N 86°14′05″W

Race 9 of 18 in the 2006 Formula One World Championship
← Previous race	Next race →

Race details
- Date: 25 June 2006
- Official name: Formula 1 Grand Prix du Canada 2006
- Location: Circuit Gilles Villeneuve, Montreal, Quebec, Canada
- Course: Street circuit
- Course length: 4.361 km (2.710 miles)
- Distance: 70 laps, 305.270 km (189.686 miles)
- Weather: Sunny and warm with temperatures reaching up to 28 °C (82 °F); wind speeds up to 4.1 kilometres per hour (2.5 mph)

Pole position
Driver	(Spain) Fernando Alonso	Renault
- Time: 1:14.942

Fastest lap
Driver	(Finland) Kimi Räikkönen	McLaren-Mercedes
- Time: 1:15.841 on lap 22

Podium
First	(Spain) Fernando Alonso	Renault
Second	(Germany) Michael Schumacher	Ferrari
Third	(Finland) Kimi Räikkönen	McLaren-Mercedes

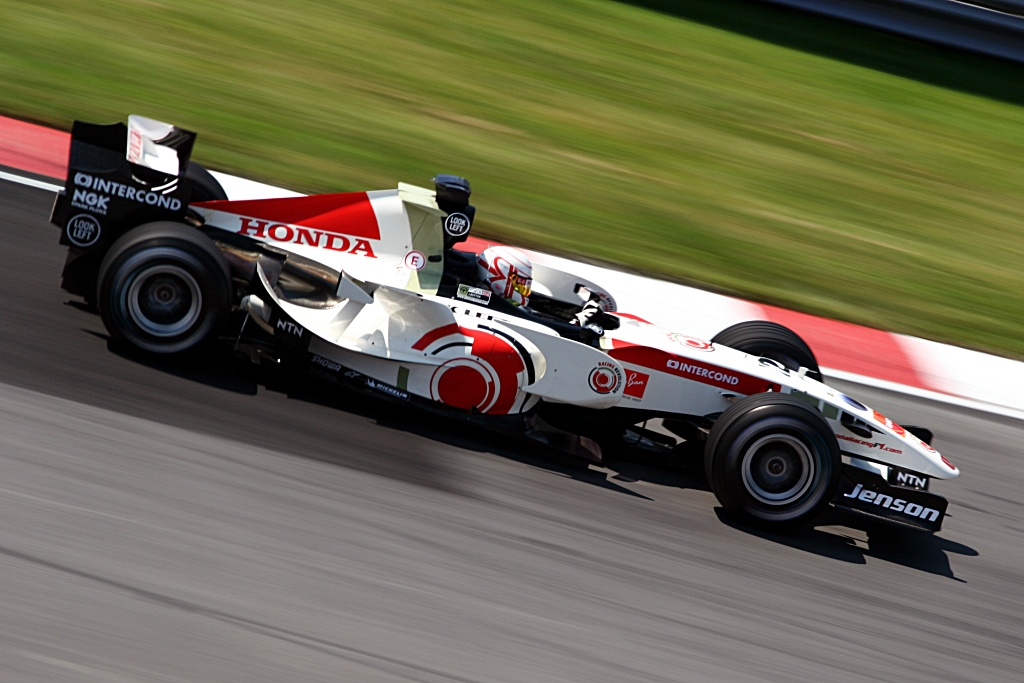
Jenson Button out-qualified his Honda teammate Rubens Barrichello and took the eighth place on the grid.

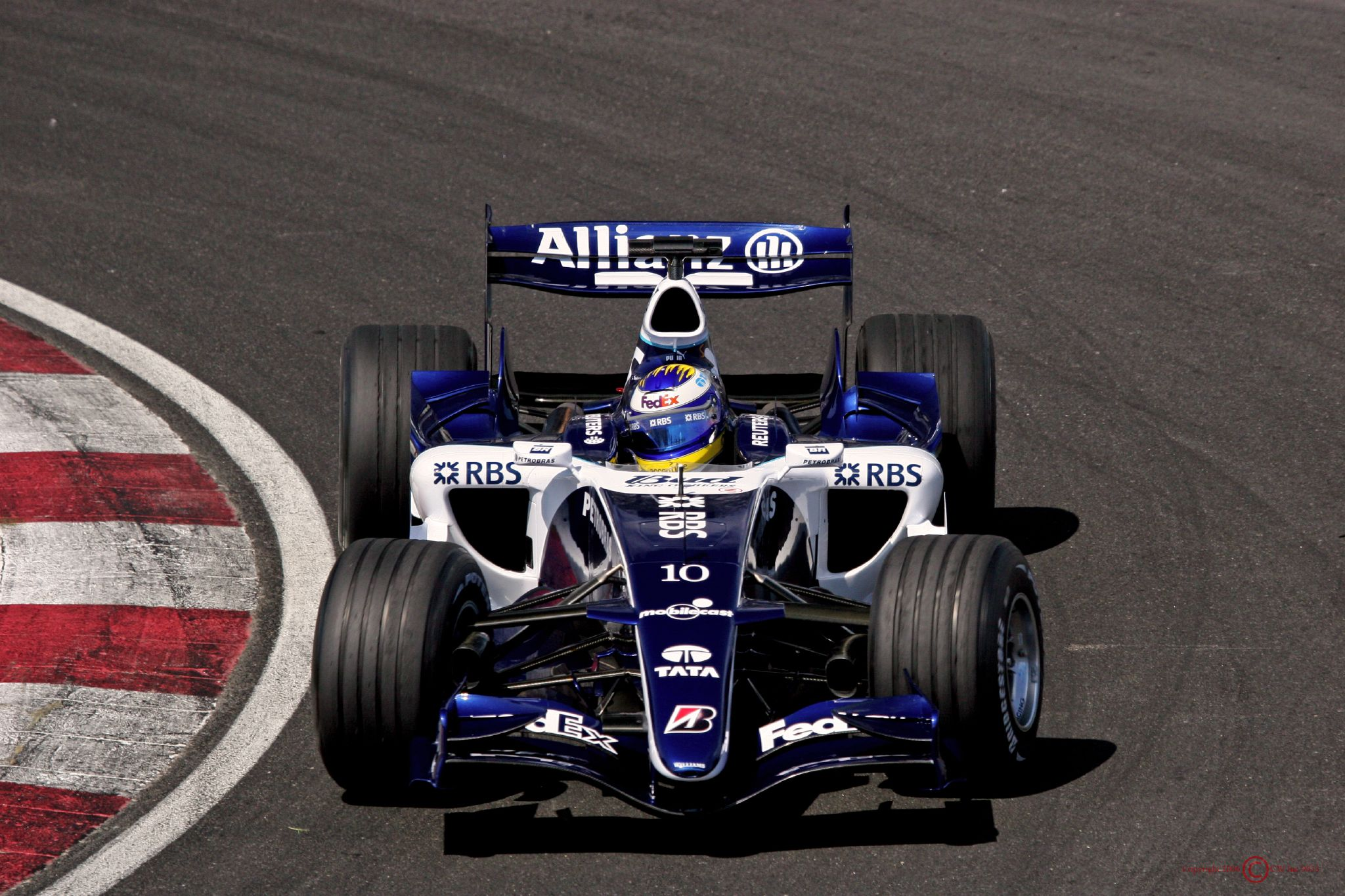
Nico Rosberg qualified in sixth place but retired on the first lap of the race.

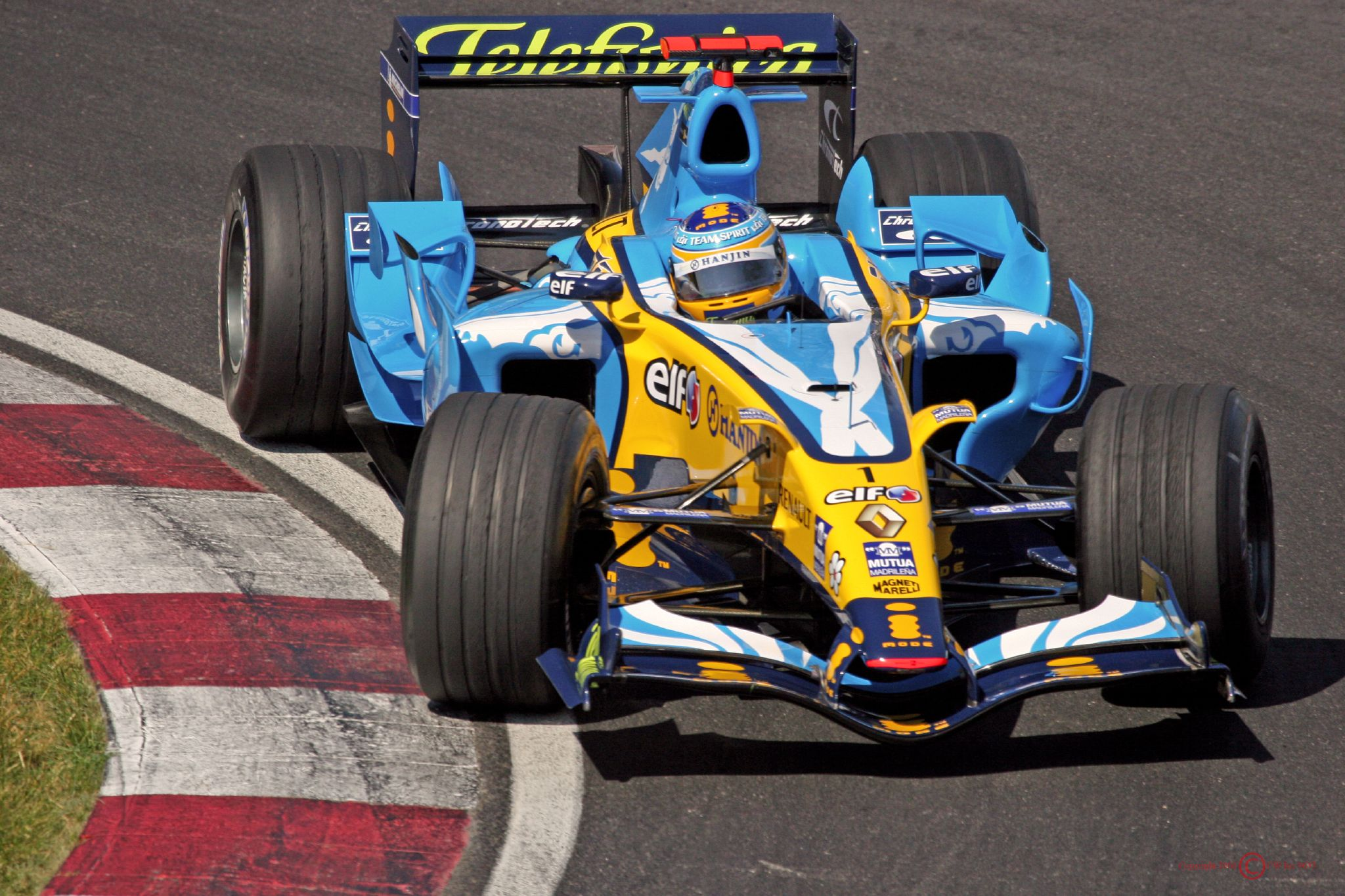
Fernando Alonso during his pole position lap.

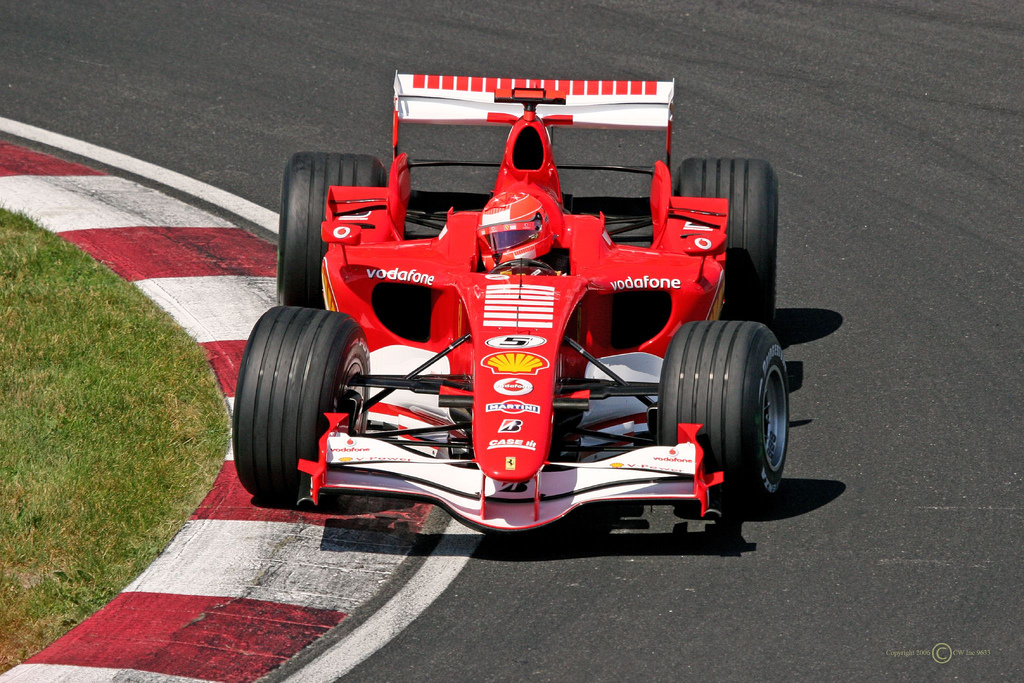
Michael Schumacher qualified his Ferrari 248 F1 in fifth position.

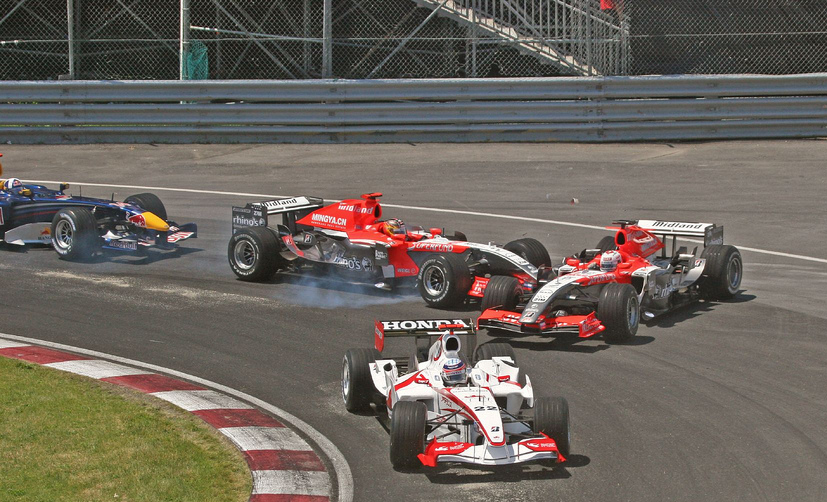
The two Midland drivers, Christijan Albers and Tiago Monteiro, collided on the first lap of the race.

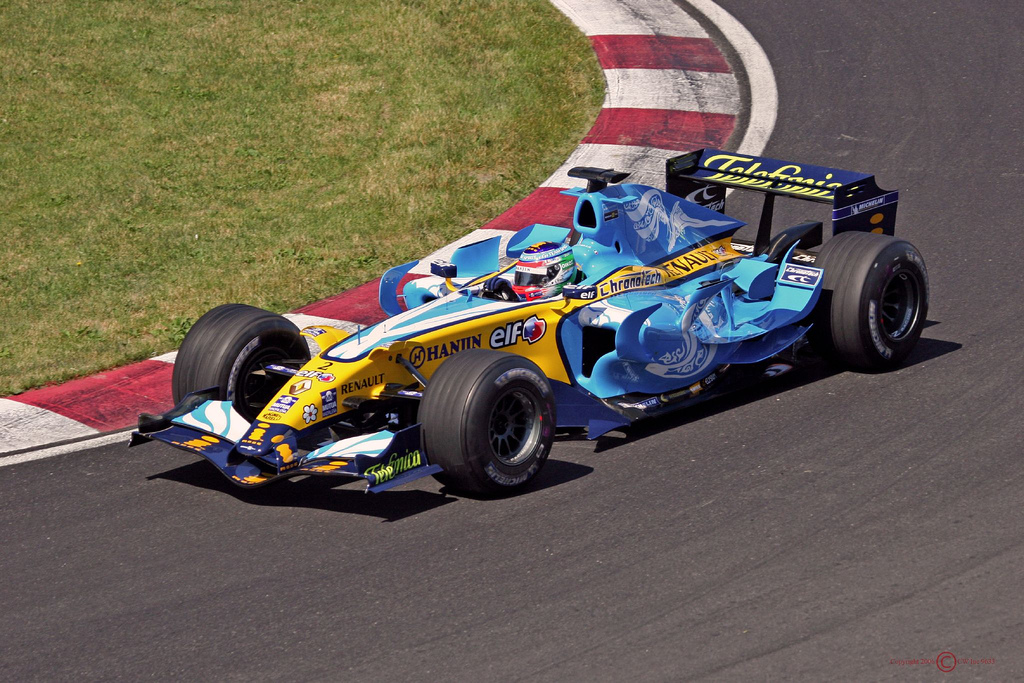
Giancarlo Fisichella finished in fourth after qualifying second because of a drive-through penalty during the race.

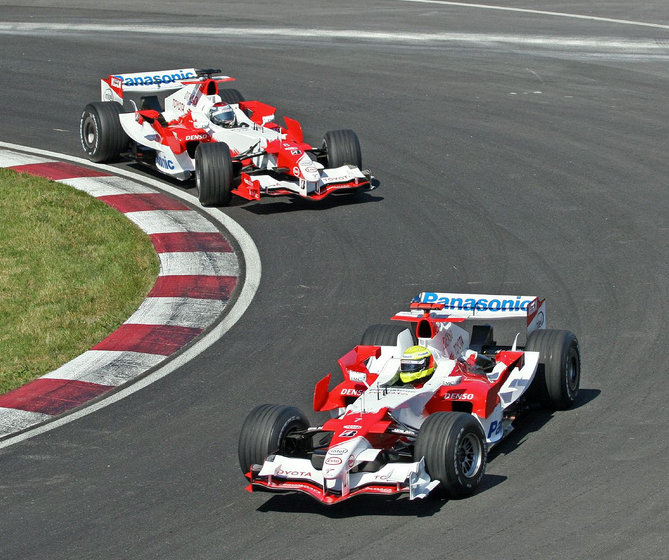
The Toyota drivers, Jarno Trulli and Ralf Schumacher, during the race. Ralf eventually retired on lap 58.

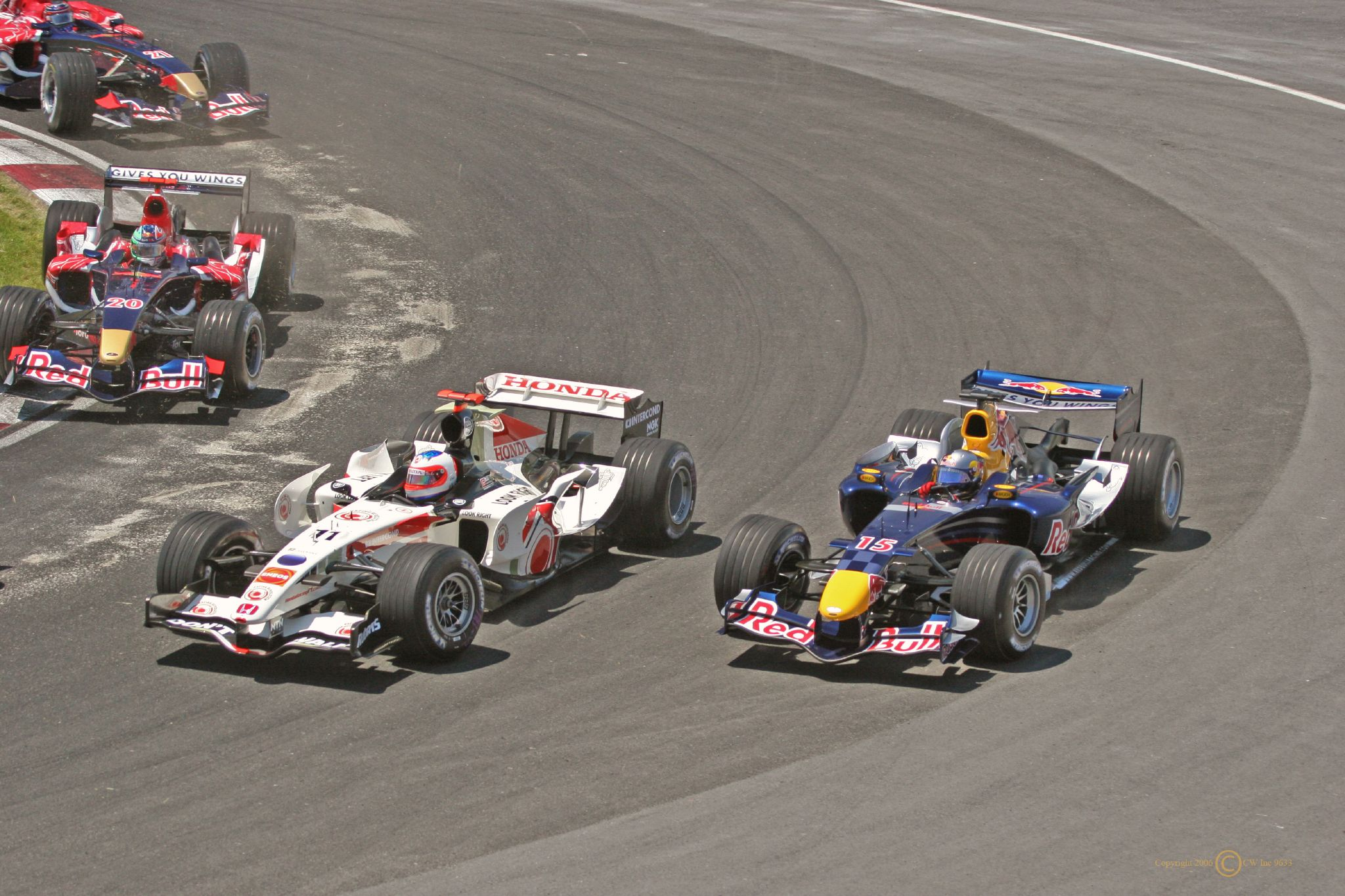
Barrichello and Klien battling during the race.

The 2006 Canadian Grand Prix (officially the Formula 1 Grand Prix du Canada 2006) was a Formula One motor race held on 25 June 2006 at the Circuit Gilles Villeneuve in Montreal, Quebec, Canada. It was the ninth race of the 2006 Formula One season.

== Friday drivers ==
The bottom 6 teams in the 2005 Constructors' Championship and Super Aguri were entitled to run a third car in free practice on Friday. These drivers drove on Friday but did not compete in qualifying or the race.

Constructor	Nat	Driver
Williams-Cosworth	(Austria)	Alexander Wurz
Honda	(United Kingdom)	Anthony Davidson
Red Bull-Ferrari	(Netherlands)	Robert Doornbos
BMW Sauber	(Poland)	Robert Kubica
MF1-Toyota	(Switzerland)	Giorgio Mondini
Toro Rosso-Cosworth	(Switzerland)	Neel Jani
Super Aguri-Honda	(Japan)	Sakon Yamamoto

== Background ==
=== Race ===
The start of the race was expected to see some formation flying from the two Renaults, only for Fisichella to slightly creep forward before the lights went out. That hence allowed Räikkönen to immediately charge past him as the Italian hit the brakes as the lights went out, and would result in a drive-through penalty later in the race.

The first lap was marked by Midland cars colliding in a tight hairpin, Albers dropped out of the race and Monteiro had to go to the pits to repair the damage. In the second lap, Montoya, who was much faster than Rosberg, attacked the German at every corner trying to pass. However, this struggle ended in a crash at the start of lap 2, which led to Rosberg retiring and Montoya still trying to stay in the race for some time after the pit stop, but eventually retired on lap 14. Schumacher was stuck behind Trulli for a large proportion of the race before finally managing to overtake him, although Alonso had gained a considerable lead over him by this point.

Starting from the first lap, in the first segment of the distance, Räikkönen actively attacked Alonso in front, and nevertheless outlasted him on the track, going to a pit stop a lap later. Thanks to this, Raikkonen could win the race, but during a pit stop there were problems with the rear right wheel, and the Finn returned to the track, losing 5 seconds to Alonso. Indeed, the second round of stops would prove even more disastrous for Räikkönen, as he not only spun on his in-lap, but had an anti-stall when trying to leave his pitbox.

With just a handful of laps left the safety car was out for a second time, as home-town hero Jacques Villeneuve crashed into the wall due to brake failure. This was Villeneuve's last F1 start at the circuit named after his father. Finally, after the appearance of the safety car on lap 60, Michael Schumacher in third was able to close on Räikkonen and overtake him on lap 69 due to the latter's error.

Alonso took his sixth win of the season and extended his championship lead over Michael Schumacher, who finished second. Räikkönen finished in third place and completed the McLaren team on the podium. Alonso now had six wins and three second places from the first nine races.

Michelin scored their 100th win as a tyre supplier.

== Classification ==
=== Qualifying ===
Pos.	No.	Driver	Constructor	Q1	Q2	Q3	Grid
1	1	(Spain) Fernando Alonso	Renault	1:15.350	1:14.726	1:14.942	1
2	2	(Italy) Giancarlo Fisichella	Renault	1:15.917	1:15.295	1:15.178	2
3	3	(Finland) Kimi Räikkönen	McLaren-Mercedes	1:15.376	1:15.273	1:15.386	3
4	8	(Italy) Jarno Trulli	Toyota	1:16.455	1:15.506	1:15.968	4
5	5	(Germany) Michael Schumacher	Ferrari	1:15.716	1:15.139	1:15.986	5
6	10	(Germany) Nico Rosberg	Williams-Cosworth	1:16.404	1:15.269	1:16.012	6
7	4	(Colombia) Juan Pablo Montoya	McLaren-Mercedes	1:16.251	1:15.253	1:16.228	7
8	12	(United Kingdom) Jenson Button	Honda	1:16.594	1:15.814	1:16.608	8
9	11	(Brazil) Rubens Barrichello	Honda	1:16.735	1:15.601	1:16.912	9
10	6	(Brazil) Felipe Massa	Ferrari	1:16.259	1:15.555	1:17.209	10
11	17	(Canada) Jacques Villeneuve	BMW Sauber	1:16.493	1:15.832		11
12	15	(Austria) Christian Klien	Red Bull-Ferrari	1:16.585	1:15.833		12
13	16	(Germany) Nick Heidfeld	BMW Sauber	1:15.906	1:15.885		13
14	7	(Germany) Ralf Schumacher	Toyota	1:16.702	1:15.888		14
15	20	(Italy) Vitantonio Liuzzi	Toro Rosso-Cosworth	1:16.581	1:16.116		15
16	14	(United Kingdom) David Coulthard	Red Bull-Ferrari	1:16.514	1:16.301		22^{1}
17	9	(Australia) Mark Webber	Williams-Cosworth	1:16.985			16
18	21	(United States) Scott Speed	Toro Rosso-Cosworth	1:17.016			17
19	18	(Portugal) Tiago Monteiro	MF1-Toyota	1:17.121			18
20	19	(Netherlands) Christijan Albers	MF1-Toyota	1:17.140			19
21	22	(Japan) Takuma Sato	Super Aguri-Honda	1:19.088			20
22	23	(France) Franck Montagny	Super Aguri-Honda	1:19.152			21

Notes

- ^1 – David Coulthard received a 10 place grid penalty because of an engine change after qualifying.

=== Race ===
Pos.	No.	Driver	Constructor	Tyre	Laps	Time/Retired	Grid	Points
1	1	(Spain) Fernando Alonso	Renault	MI	70	1:34:37.308	1	10
2	5	(Germany) Michael Schumacher	Ferrari	B	70	+2.111	5	8
3	3	(Finland) Kimi Räikkönen	McLaren-Mercedes	MI	70	+8.813	3	6
4	2	(Italy) Giancarlo Fisichella	Renault	MI	70	+15.679	2	5
5	6	(Brazil) Felipe Massa	Ferrari	B	70	+25.172	10	4
6	8	(Italy) Jarno Trulli	Toyota	B	69	+1 lap	4	3
7	16	(Germany) Nick Heidfeld	BMW Sauber	MI	69	+1 lap	13	2
8	14	(United Kingdom) David Coulthard	Red Bull-Ferrari	MI	69	+1 lap	22	1
9	12	(United Kingdom) Jenson Button	Honda	MI	69	+1 lap	8	
10	21	(United States) Scott Speed	Toro Rosso-Cosworth	MI	69	+1 lap	17	
11	15	(Austria) Christian Klien	Red Bull-Ferrari	MI	69	+1 lap	12	
12	9	(Australia) Mark Webber	Williams-Cosworth	B	69	+1 lap	16	
13	20	(Italy) Vitantonio Liuzzi	Toro Rosso-Cosworth	MI	68	+2 laps	15	
14	18	(Portugal) Tiago Monteiro	MF1-Toyota	B	66	+4 laps	18	
15	22	(Japan) Takuma Sato	Super Aguri-Honda	B	64	Accident	20	
Ret	17	(Canada) Jacques Villeneuve	BMW Sauber	MI	58	Accident	11	
Ret	7	(Germany) Ralf Schumacher	Toyota	B	58	Withdrew	14	
Ret	4	(Colombia) Juan Pablo Montoya	McLaren-Mercedes	MI	13	Accident	7	
Ret	11	(Brazil) Rubens Barrichello	Honda	MI	11	Engine	9	
Ret	23	(France) Franck Montagny	Super Aguri-Honda	B	2	Engine	21	
Ret	10	(Germany) Nico Rosberg	Williams-Cosworth	B	1	Collision	6	
Ret	19	(Netherlands) Christijan Albers	MF1-Toyota	B	0	Collision	19	

== Championship standings after the race ==
Drivers' Championship standings

	Pos.	Driver	Points
	1	(Spain) Fernando Alonso	84
	2	(Germany) Michael Schumacher	59
	3	(Finland) Kimi Räikkönen	39
	4	(Italy) Giancarlo Fisichella	37
1	5	(Brazil) Felipe Massa	28

Constructors' Championship standings

Pos.	Constructor	Points
1	(France) Renault	121
2	(Italy) Ferrari	87
3	(United Kingdom) McLaren-Mercedes	65
4	(Japan) Honda	29
5	(Germany) BMW Sauber	19

- Note: Only the top five positions are included for both sets of standings.

Previous race: 2006 British Grand Prix	FIA Formula One World Championship; 2006 season	Next race: 2006 United States Grand Prix
Previous race: 2005 Canadian Grand Prix	Canadian Grand Prix	Next race: 2007 Canadian Grand Prix
