= 2006 Spanish Grand Prix =

Coordinates: 41°34′12″N 2°15′40″E

Race 6 of 18 in the 2006 Formula One World Championship
← Previous race	Next race →
- Circuit de Catalunya

Race details
- Date: May 14, 2006
- Official name: Formula 1 Gran Premio Telefónica de España 2006
- Location: Circuit de Catalunya, Montmeló, Catalonia, Spain
- Course: Permanent racing facility
- Course length: 4.627 km (2.875 miles)
- Distance: 66 laps, 305.256 km (189.75 miles)
- Weather: Sunny, 28°C
- Attendance: 131,200

Pole position
Driver	(Spain) Fernando Alonso	Renault
- Time: 1:14.648

Fastest lap
Driver	(Brazil) Felipe Massa	Ferrari
- Time: 1:16.648 on lap 42

Podium
First	(Spain) Fernando Alonso	Renault
Second	(Germany) Michael Schumacher	Ferrari
Third	(Italy) Giancarlo Fisichella	Renault

The 2006 Spanish Grand Prix (officially the Formula 1 Gran Premio Telefónica de España 2006) was a Formula One motor race held on 14 May 2006 at the Circuit de Catalunya in Montmeló, Spain. It was the sixth round of the 2006 Formula One season and the forty-eighth Spanish Grand Prix. The 66-lap race was won by Fernando Alonso for the Renault team, from a pole position start. Michael Schumacher finished second in a Ferrari with Alonso's teammate Giancarlo Fisichella third.

As a consequence of the race, Alonso stretched his lead to fifteen points in the Drivers' Championship over Schumacher. Alonso's team, Renault, also increased their lead, but did so in the Constructors' Championship standings. This put them nineteen points ahead of Ferrari.

== Background ==
=== Championship standings before the race ===
Before the race, Renault driver Fernando Alonso led the Drivers' Championship with 44 points; Ferrari driver Michael Schumacher was second on 31 points. Behind Alonso and Schumacher in the Drivers' Championship, Kimi Räikkönen was third on 23 points in a McLaren, with Giancarlo Fisichella and Felipe Massa on 18 and 15 points respectively. In the Constructors' Championship, Renault were leading on 62 points and Ferrari were second on 46 points, with McLaren third on 42 points.

=== Entrants ===
The Grand Prix was contested by eleven teams with two drivers each. The teams (also known as Constructors) were Renault, McLaren, Ferrari, Toyota, Williams, Honda, Red Bull, BMW, MF1, Toro Rosso and Super Aguri.

== Practice ==
Three practice sessions were held before the Sunday race: two on Friday, both lasting 90 minutes, and one on Saturday for 60 minutes. The first session was led by Ferrari's Felipe Massa, the second by Honda's third driver Anthony Davidson and the third by Massa's teammate Michael Schumacher.

=== Friday drivers ===
The bottom 6 teams in the 2005 Constructors' Championship and Super Aguri were entitled to run a third car in free practice on Friday. These drivers drove on Friday but did not compete in qualifying or the race.

Constructor	Nat	Driver
Williams-Cosworth	(Austria)	Alexander Wurz
Honda	(United Kingdom)	Anthony Davidson
Red Bull-Ferrari	(Netherlands)	Robert Doornbos
BMW Sauber	(Poland)	Robert Kubica
MF1-Toyota	(Switzerland)	Giorgio Mondini
Toro Rosso-Cosworth	(Switzerland)	Neel Jani
Super Aguri-Honda		-

== Qualifying ==
Saturday afternoon's qualifying session was divided into three parts. The first part ran for 15 minutes, and cars that finished the session 17th position or lower were eliminated from qualifying. The second part of the qualifying session lasted 15 minutes and eliminated cars that finished in positions 11 to 16. The final part of the qualifying session ran for 20 minutes which determined the positions from first to tenth, and decided pole position. Cars which failed to make the final session could refuel before the race, so ran lighter in those sessions.

Championship leader Fernando Alonso clinched his second pole position of the season with a time of 1:14.648 and was joined on the front row by Renault teammate Giancarlo Fisichella. Michael Schumacher and Felipe Massa put their Ferraris on the second row of the grid.

Pos.	No.	Driver	Constructor	Q1	Q2	Q3	Grid
1	1	(Spain) Fernando Alonso	Renault	1:15.816	1:15.124	1:14.648	1
2	2	(Italy) Giancarlo Fisichella	Renault	1:16.046	1:14.766	1:14.709	2
3	5	(Germany) Michael Schumacher	Ferrari	1:16.049	1:14.637	1:14.970	3
4	6	(Brazil) Felipe Massa	Ferrari	1:16.359	1:15.245	1:15.442	4
5	11	(Brazil) Rubens Barrichello	Honda	1:16.266	1:15.258	1:15.885	5
6	7	(Germany) Ralf Schumacher	Toyota	1:16.234	1:15.164	1:15.885	6
7	8	(Italy) Jarno Trulli	Toyota	1:16.174	1:15.068	1:15.976	7
8	12	(United Kingdom) Jenson Button	Honda	1:16.054	1:15.150	1:16.008	8
9	3	(Finland) Kimi Räikkönen	McLaren-Mercedes	1:16.613	1:15.422	1:16.015	9
10	16	(Germany) Nick Heidfeld	BMW Sauber	1:16.322	1:15.468	1:17.144	10
11	9	(Australia) Mark Webber	Williams-Cosworth	1:16.685	1:15.502		11
12	4	(Colombia) Juan Pablo Montoya	McLaren-Mercedes	1:16.195	1:15.801		12
13	10	(Germany) Nico Rosberg	Williams-Cosworth	1:17.213	1:15.804		13
14	17	(Canada) Jacques Villeneuve	BMW Sauber	1:16.066	1:15.847		22^{1}
15	15	(Austria) Christian Klien	Red Bull-Ferrari	1:16.627	1:15.928		14
16	20	(Italy) Vitantonio Liuzzi	Toro Rosso-Cosworth	1:17.105	1:16.661		15
17	21	(United States) Scott Speed	Toro Rosso-Cosworth	1:17.361			16
18	18	(Portugal) Tiago Monteiro	MF1-Toyota	1:17.702			17
19	19	(Netherlands) Christijan Albers	MF1-Toyota	1:18.024			18
20	22	(Japan) Takuma Sato	Super Aguri-Honda	1:18.920			19
21	23	(France) Franck Montagny	Super Aguri-Honda	1:20.763			20
22	14	(United Kingdom) David Coulthard	Red Bull-Ferrari	No time^{2}			21

Notes

- ^1 – Jacques Villeneuve received a ten-place grid penalty due to an engine change. The engine was damaged during transport to Barcelona.
- ^2 – David Coulthard did not get any time in the first part of Q1 as a mechanical failure caused him to spin into the tyre barriers at the third corner.

== Race ==
The race was held on 14 May 2006 and was run for 66 laps.

=== Race report ===
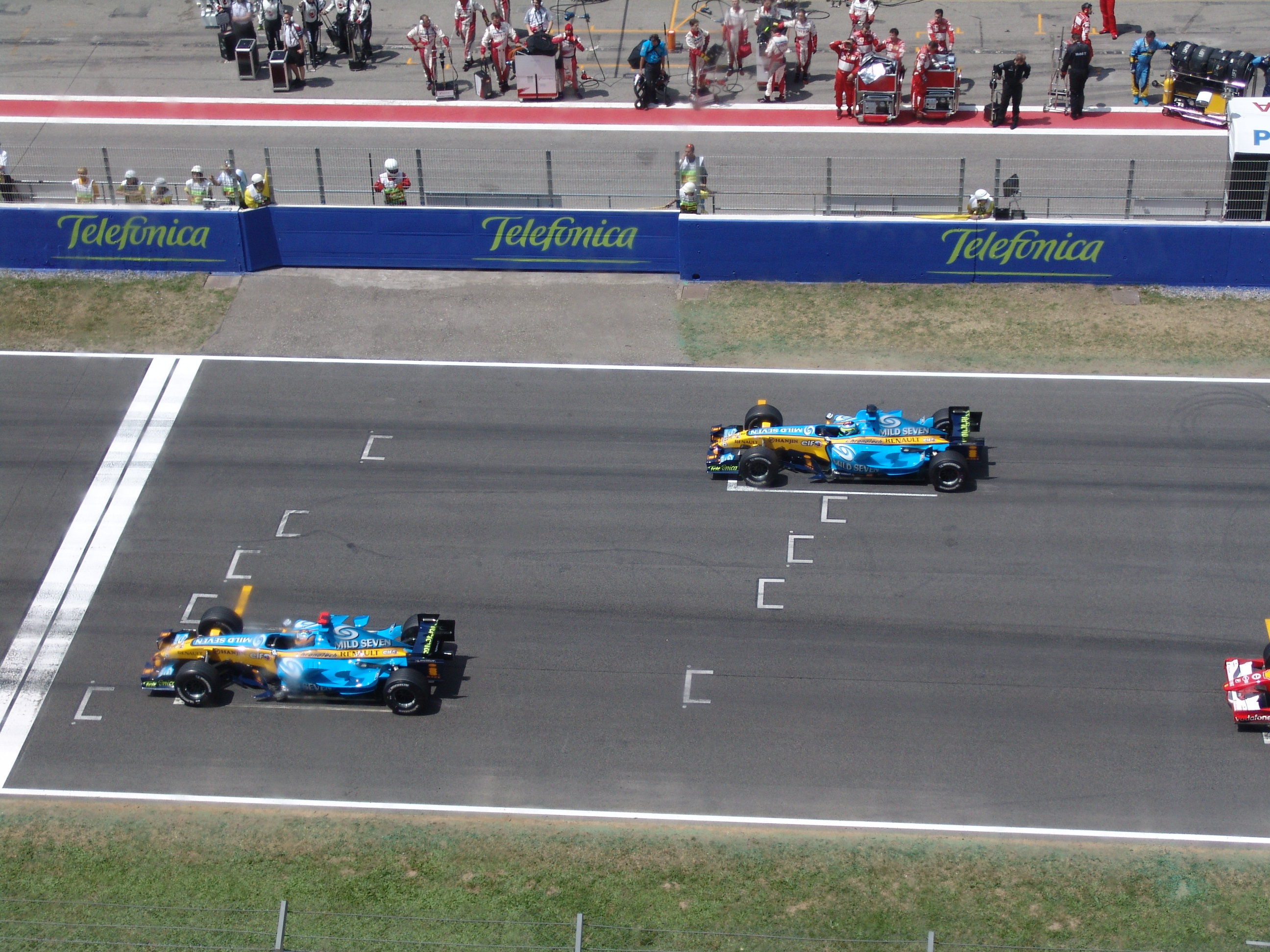
The Renault cars of Alonso and Fisichella occupied the front row of the grid.

At the start, the first four remained in formation, although Felipe Massa was pressured by Kimi Räikkönen, who had jumped up from ninth to fifth. Fernando Alonso managed to break away while teammate Giancarlo Fisichella held up the chasers. The first round of pit stops was initiated by Alonso on lap 17. Fisichella followed him on lap 18 and Massa on lap 19.

Suddenly, Juan Pablo Montoya spun at high speed and beached his McLaren on a kerb. If the safety car was deployed, it would give Schumacher a big advantage, but Montoya's car was lifted away by a crane. Alonso lost time while passing one of the Midlands and Schumacher lost time when he made a rare mistake on his own. The German pitted on lap 23 and rejoined 10 seconds behind the race leader, but crucially just ahead of Fisichella.

The second round of pit stops did not lead to any changes in the leading pack and Alonso took his third win of the season, extending his championship lead to 15 points.

=== Race classification ===
Pos.	No.	Driver	Constructor	Tyre	Laps	Time/Retired	Grid	Points
1	1	(Spain) Fernando Alonso	Renault	MI	66	1:26:21.759	1	10
2	5	(Germany) Michael Schumacher	Ferrari	B	66	+18.502	3	8
3	2	(Italy) Giancarlo Fisichella	Renault	MI	66	+23.951	2	6
4	6	(Brazil) Felipe Massa	Ferrari	B	66	+29.853	4	5
5	3	(Finland) Kimi Räikkönen	McLaren-Mercedes	MI	66	+56.875	9	4
6	12	(United Kingdom) Jenson Button	Honda	MI	66	+58.347	8	3
7	11	(Brazil) Rubens Barrichello	Honda	MI	65	+1 Lap	5	2
8	16	(Germany) Nick Heidfeld	BMW Sauber	MI	65	+1 Lap	10	1
9	9	(Australia) Mark Webber	Williams-Cosworth	B	65	+1 Lap	11	
10	8	(Italy) Jarno Trulli	Toyota	B	65	+1 Lap	7	
11	10	(Germany) Nico Rosberg	Williams-Cosworth	B	65	+1 Lap	13	
12	17	(Canada) Jacques Villeneuve	BMW Sauber	MI	65	+1 Lap	22	
13	15	(Austria) Christian Klien	Red Bull-Ferrari	MI	65	+1 Lap	14	
14	14	(United Kingdom) David Coulthard	Red Bull-Ferrari	MI	65	+1 Lap	21	
15	20	(Italy) Vitantonio Liuzzi	Toro Rosso-Cosworth	MI	63	Hydraulics	15	
16	18	(Portugal) Tiago Monteiro	MF1-Toyota	B	63	+3 Laps	17	
17	22	(Japan) Takuma Sato	Super Aguri-Honda	B	62	+4 Laps	19	
Ret	19	(Netherlands) Christijan Albers	MF1-Toyota	B	48	Broken wing	18	
Ret	21	(United States) Scott Speed	Toro Rosso-Cosworth	MI	47	Engine	16	
Ret	7	(Germany) Ralf Schumacher	Toyota	B	31	Electronics	6	
Ret	4	(Colombia) Juan Pablo Montoya	McLaren-Mercedes	MI	17	Spin	12	
Ret	23	(France) Franck Montagny	Super Aguri-Honda	B	10	Driveshaft	20	

== Championship standings after the race ==
Drivers' Championship standings

Pos.	Driver	Points
1	(Spain) Fernando Alonso	54
2	(Germany) Michael Schumacher	39
3	(Finland) Kimi Räikkönen	27
4	(Italy) Giancarlo Fisichella	24
5	(Brazil) Felipe Massa	20

Constructors' Championship standings

Pos.	Constructor	Points
1	(France) Renault	78
2	(Italy) Ferrari	59
3	(United Kingdom) McLaren-Mercedes	42
4	(Japan) Honda	24
5	(Germany) BMW Sauber	12

- Note: Only the top five positions are included for both sets of standings.

== See also ==
- 2006 Catalunya GP2 Series round

Previous race: 2006 European Grand Prix	FIA Formula One World Championship; 2006 season	Next race: 2006 Monaco Grand Prix
Previous race: 2005 Spanish Grand Prix	Spanish Grand Prix	Next race: 2007 Spanish Grand Prix
