= 2006 Monaco Grand Prix =

Coordinates: 43°44′4.74″N 7°25′16.8″E

Race 7 of 18 in the 2006 Formula One World Championship
| ← Previous race | Next race → |
- The Monaco circuit, last modified in 2003

Race details
- Date: 28 May 2006
- Official name: Formula 1 Grand Prix de Monaco 2006
- Location: Circuit de Monaco, Monte Carlo
- Course: Street circuit
- Course length: 3.340 km (2.075 miles)
- Distance: 78 laps, 260.520 km (161.880 miles)
- Weather: Fine

Pole position
| Driver | (Spain) Fernando Alonso | Renault |
- Time: 1:13.962

Fastest lap
| Driver | (Germany) Michael Schumacher | Ferrari |
- Time: 1:15.143 on lap 74

Podium
| First | (Spain) Fernando Alonso | Renault |
| Second | (Colombia) Juan Pablo Montoya | McLaren-Mercedes |
| Third | (United Kingdom) David Coulthard | Red Bull-Ferrari |

The 2006 Monaco Grand Prix (formally known as the Formula 1 Grand Prix de Monaco 2006) was a Formula One motor race held on 28 May 2006 at the Circuit de Monaco. The 78-lap race was the seventh round of the 2006 Formula One season. Prior to the race, Renault's Fernando Alonso had finished on the podium in all of the previous six Grands Prix, winning three of those races. His main championship rival, Michael Schumacher was looking to win the race as it would equal Ayrton Senna's record at Monaco for most wins (six).

The race was remembered by many people for Michael Schumacher's actions during the closing stages of the qualifying session for the race, where he stopped his car in La Rascasse corner, thus preventing his rival Fernando Alonso from attempting to improve his time. Schumacher maintained that this was an innocent mistake; his actions were deemed deliberate by the race stewards and he was demoted to the back of the grid as punishment for his actions, promoting Alonso from second to pole position. It was also remembered for Schumacher coming back from his penalty during the race to finish fifth on a circuit that is notorious for overtaking being almost impossible.

Fernando Alonso went on to win the race, his first in Monaco. Juan Pablo Montoya came second, scoring his last podium and David Coulthard took full advantage of Jarno Trulli's late hydraulic failure to finish in third, scoring Red Bull Racing's first ever podium finish and also first ever podium for Ferrari as an engine supplier for a customer team since 2003 United States Grand Prix when Sauber was a Ferrari customer team but badged as Petronas. It was also his first podium finish since the 2003 Japanese Grand Prix.

== Report ==
=== Background ===
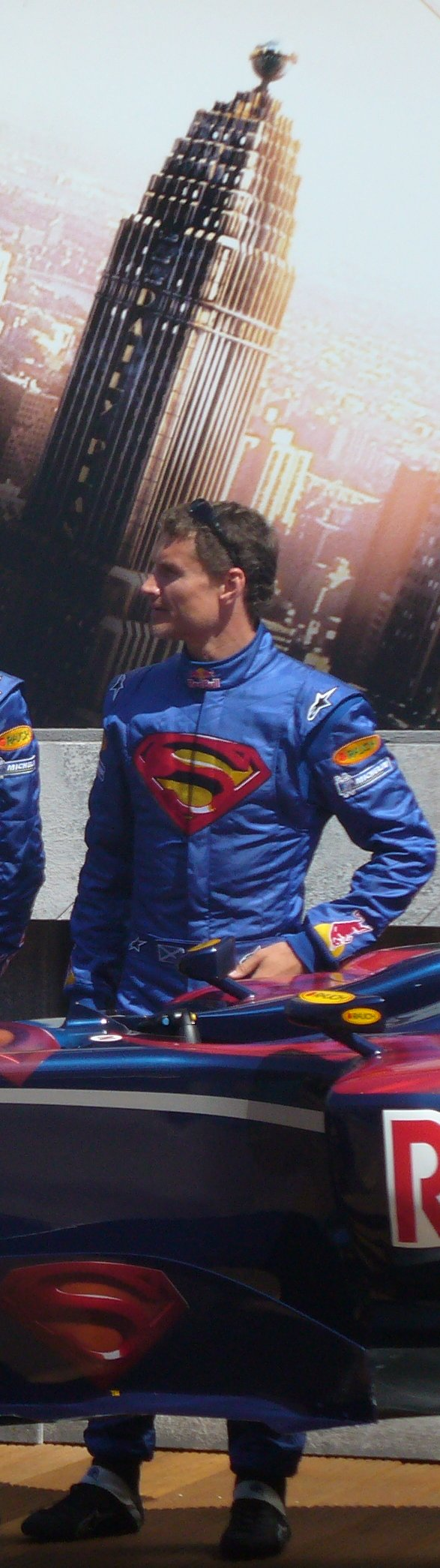
Red Bull Racing carried the Superman logo to promote the launch of Superman Returns, and David Coulthard went to the podium wearing the hero's cape.

During the break between the Spanish Grand Prix and the Monaco Grand Prix, a test session was held at the Circuit Paul Ricard. Fernando Alonso topped the times on the first day of testing, under a tenth of a second faster than the Ferrari of Felipe Massa who was second fastest. Toyota also had a promising day testing their new car, the Toyota TF106B, with Jarno Trulli coming in third place, who was also less than a tenth of a second behind Alonso. Heikki Kovalainen in the second Renault was fourth ahead of both the McLarens of Räikkönen and Montoya. Alonso was top on day two as well, with Kovalainen second in the other Renault. Jacques Villeneuve was third in his BMW Sauber, a second slower than the Renaults. Klien, Trulli and Massa completed the top six respectively. Villeneuve got the better of the two Renaults on day three, the Canadian was over four tenths faster than his nearest rival, Heikki Kovalainen. Toyota were fastest on day four, Olivier Panis was fastest ahead of Ricardo Zonta and the two McLarens of Pedro de la Rosa and Gary Paffett.

As well as testing in Paul Ricard, some teams, namely Honda and Williams, were testing at an Italian circuit near Vallelunga, which had recently had a new chicane added to it to help simulate Monaco's characteristics. Honda's Anthony Davidson was top of the time sheet on day one, with Alexander Wurz's Williams around 4 tenths behind him. Honda continued to their advantage over Williams on day two of testing, with Jenson Button topping the times; Davidson was second and Mark Webber was third. Honda were fastest again on day three, this time Rubens Barrichello was fastest with Jenson Button in second and Mark Webber third. Williams were left on their own in Vallelunga on day four, Mark Webber and Narain Karthikeyan driving for Williams. The Australian was fastest with Karthikeyan around 4 tenths slower than him.

=== Friday drivers ===
The bottom 6 teams in the 2005 Constructors' Championship and Super Aguri were entitled to run a third car in free practice on Friday. These drivers drove on Friday but did not compete in qualifying or the race.

| Constructor | Nat | Driver |
|---|---|---|
| Williams-Cosworth | (Austria) | Alexander Wurz |
| Honda | (United Kingdom) | Anthony Davidson |
| Red Bull-Ferrari | (Netherlands) | Robert Doornbos |
| BMW Sauber | (Poland) | Robert Kubica |
| MF1-Toyota | (Switzerland) | Giorgio Mondini |
| Toro Rosso-Cosworth | (Switzerland) | Neel Jani |
| Super Aguri-Honda | | - |

=== Practice ===
Fernando Alonso showed he had intention of winning his first Monaco Grand Prix as he was fastest in the opening practice session, recording a best lap of 1:16.712, a tenth of a second faster than Honda test driver Anthony Davidson, who recorded a personal best of 1:16.872. Underlining Renault's challenge was third-fastest Giancarlo Fisichella, who was right behind Mondini, with a best time of 1:16.88.

Alexander Wurz was fastest in the second practice session, one tenth faster than Mondini and two tenths faster than third fastest, Juan Pablo Montoya. Wurz was very pleased with his performance in practice, "I went through my tyre choice and I have to say the way the circuit is progressing, it is coming to us just as it did at the Nürburgring, which is good. This makes me quite confident and positive that we will have a good weekend" he said. Anthony Davidson had dislodged a marker stick in the "Swimming Pool" to cause the red flag at the start of the session. After the restart, Davidson got his entry to the "Ste Devote" corner wrong and understeered into the tyre wall, removing the Honda's front wing and left front wheel.

Alonso was quickest in the Saturday morning session. Michael Schumacher, who had challenged Alonso all through the session, was second, 2 tenths slower than Alonso. Fisichella was third, Coulthard fourth, Nico Rosberg fifth, and Montoya sixth.

=== Qualifying ===
Conditions were warm and sunny for the qualifying session for the race the following day, perhaps the biggest challenge for the drivers was getting a "clear track", meaning the drivers wanted a qualifying run without any cars in their way as this can seriously compromise a driver's time with the lack of width around the track so there was a possibility of a "big-name" going out before the top ten shootout. Vitantonio Liuzzi was the first driver to set a time in the session. By the time everyone, except Michael Schumacher, had set a time, Felipe Massa lost control of his Ferrari at Casino Square; so the Brazilian would start from the back of the grid and the session was red flagged. The session restarted at 1:10pm local time and Schumacher did set a time and was safely through to the second phase. Scott Speed had a good chance of qualifying for the second session, but an error at the chicane meant he was eliminated from qualifying. Rubens Barrichello made a last-ditch effort to get out of the elimination zone and did as he moved up to eighth. At the end of the first session Michael Schumacher was fastest, while Christijan Albers, Tiago Monteiro, Takuma Sato, Franck Montagny, Scott Speed and Felipe Massa were eliminated.

Nick Heidfeld was the first to set a time in the second session before being beaten by the Renault of Fernando Alonso and McLaren's Kimi Räikkönen who would later battle for the fastest time for the remainder of the session. So the 2005 pole position man, Kimi Räikkönen, was fastest with Fernando Alonso closely behind. David Coulthard was the surprise addition to the final session in his Red Bull. Ralf Schumacher, Christian Klien, Vitantonio Liuzzi, Jenson Button, Jacques Villeneuve and Nick Heidfeld were eliminated.

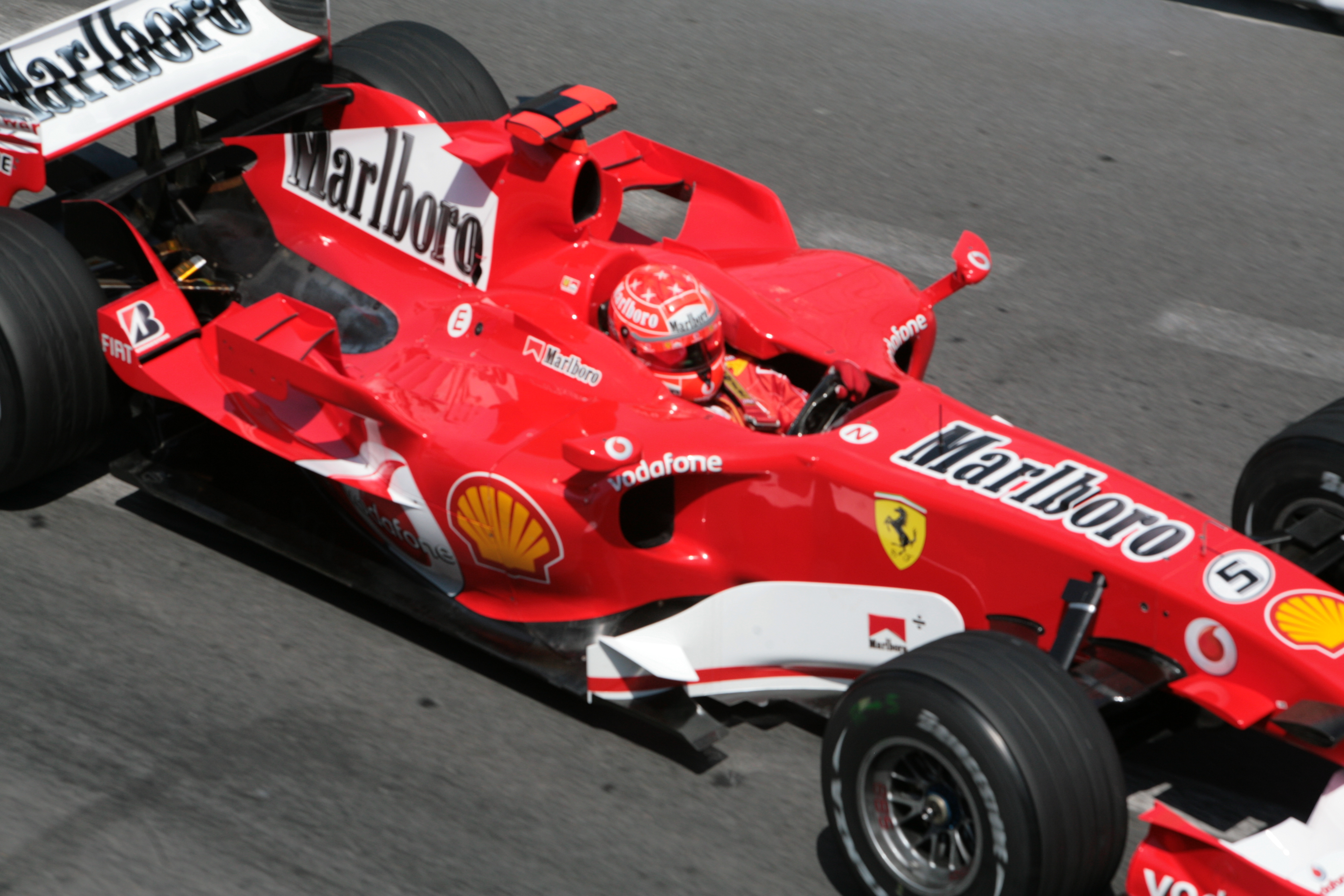
Michael Schumacher set the fastest time, but was relegated to the back of the grid for impeding rival cars.

==== Michael Schumachers' Rascasse "parking" incident and other penalties ====
The final qualifying session was overshadowed by Michael Schumacher's actions in the dying moments of the session as his rival, Fernando Alonso, was on a flying lap and was, at sector two, over two tenths of a second faster than the German. However, Schumacher slid into and stopped his car against the barriers in the Rascasse corner, which compromised Alonso's lap. When asked about the incident, Schumacher responded by saying that he "locked up the front and went wide." The consensus in the paddock was that it was a deliberate act and the issue was raised with the race stewards. The stewards agreed and punished Schumacher by sending him to the back of the grid, alongside his teammate, making this the first time ever in the history of the sport that two Ferrari team cars would start a race on the back row. Ferrari's Managerial Director, Jean Todt, said that he was "disgusted" by the decision. Steward Joaquin Verdegay commented, "He performed some absolutely unnecessary and pathetic counter-steering, and that lasted five metres, until there was no more chances of going through the turn normally. He lost control of the car while travelling at 16 km/h (9.9 mph). That's something completely unjustifiable." Former driver Keke Rosberg said of the incident, "It was the cheapest, dirtiest thing I have ever seen in F1. He should leave F1 and go home."

Schumacher was not the only driver to be punished in qualifying; Giancarlo Fisichella was also punished by the stewards for blocking David Coulthard from improving his time and the Italian lost his three fastest lap times and dropped five places on the grid.

=== Race ===
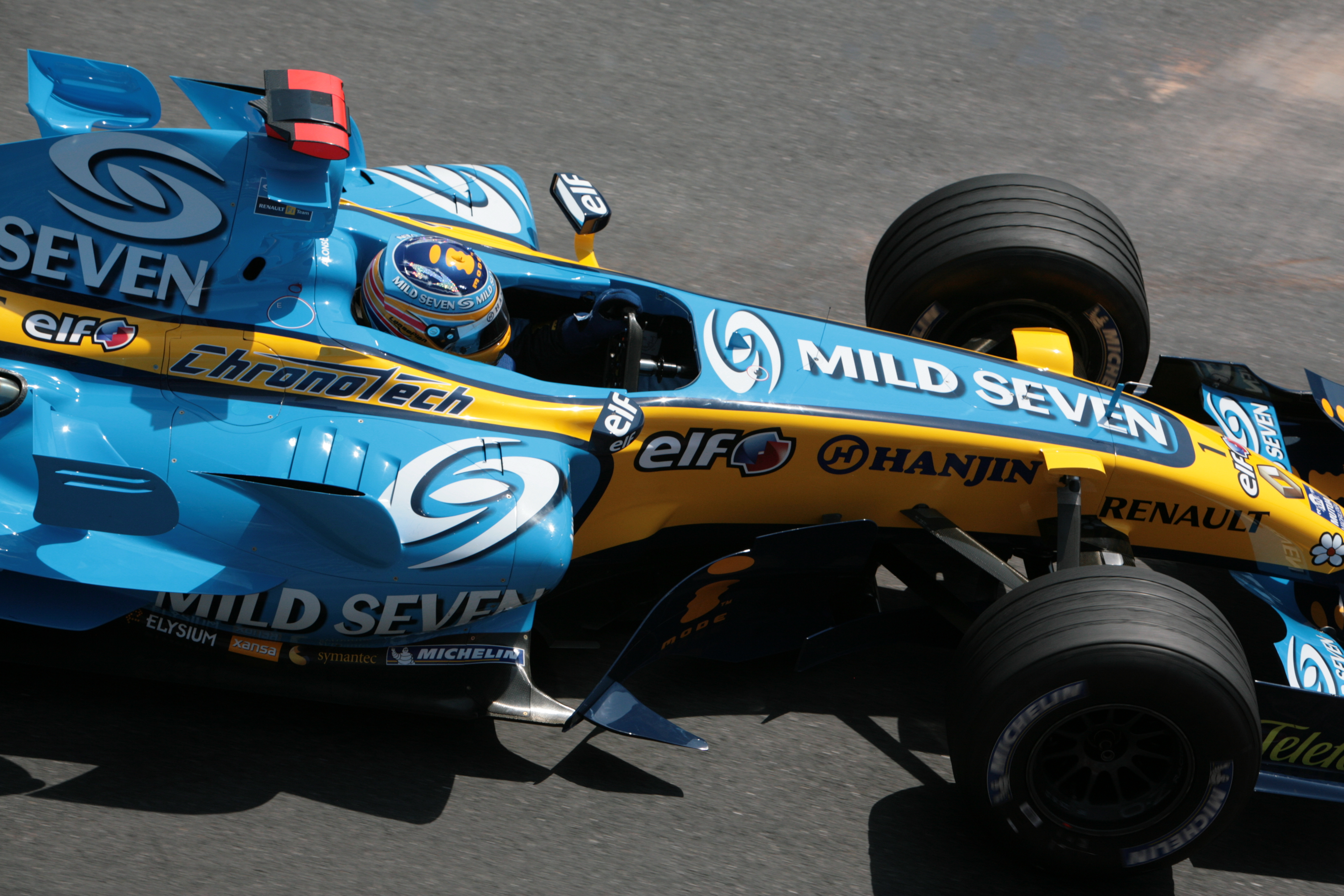
The race was won comfortably by Fernando Alonso after closest challengers Kimi Räikkönen and Mark Webber suffered reliability problems.

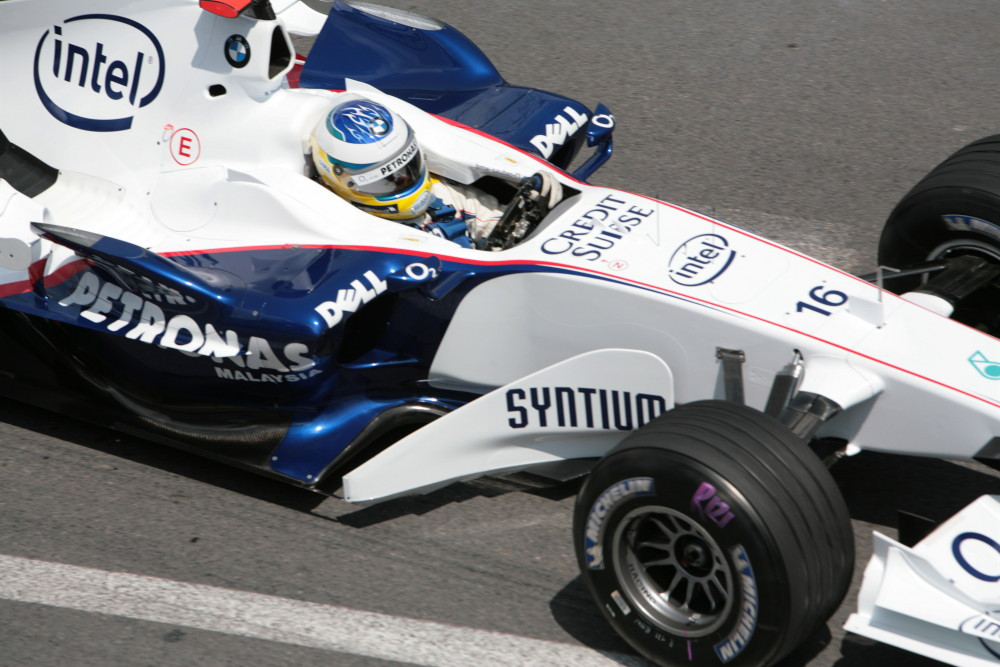
Nick Heidfeld scored two World Championship points by finishing in seventh position.

With Schumacher starting from the back of the grid and Mark Webber between him and his closest rival, Kimi Räikkönen, Fernando Alonso was in a good position. Like the qualifying session the day before, the sun was out and was most certainly staying out for the entire race. Coming into first corner, Alonso led the Williams of Webber and the two McLarens of Räikkönen and Montoya, nearly all 22 cars escaped the first corner unscathed, only Tiago Monteiro had picked up a problem, losing his front wing after a minor collision with his teammate, Christijan Albers. By the end of lap one, Michael Schumacher had already passed Takuma Sato after starting the race from the pit lane and Alonso led the race by 8 tenths of a second from Mark Webber. The Australian ran wide at St Devote and was overtaken by Räikkönen at Casino Square during lap two and was now catching Alonso by setting the fastest lap and by lap four Räikkönen had Alonso in his sight.

In the mid-field, Schumacher was up in 16th place and was right behind the Honda of Jenson Button, but he would not get past Button until the 21st lap when he overtook the Briton in the Chicane. By lap 14, the leaders had already caught up with the backmarkers of the two Super Aguris and Monteiro's Midland. Albers was given a stop-and-go penalty on lap 18 for causing an avoidable collision with his teammate and took his penalty a lap later. By lap 21, the first round of pit stops had begun, Tiago Monteiro, who had already been into the pits, was the first driver to make a scheduled stop. Räikkönen was the first of the top three drivers to pit, which was on lap 22. Alonso pitted from the lead two laps later, leaving Mark Webber in the race lead. After a fast in-lap, Webber pitted from the lead and had the potential to come out ahead of Räikkönen. But he failed to come out in front of the Finnish driver and retained his position. By lap 34, Schumacher was up in 13th position, behind David Coulthard, but two laps later Schumacher came in for his first stop of the race and, with a stop of 9.1 seconds, was fueled until the end of the race.

By lap 46, Rubens Barrichello, who had been off pace for the entire race, pitted in for his first and only stop of the race. Webber was having a good race for Williams that afternoon, but it was to be cut short due to an exhaust failure; as the Australian completed his 48th lap, smoke started to appear at the back of his car and it blew up in flames at the exit of the pit lane. The safety car was deployed so marshals could get Webber's Williams off track so the rest of the field could resume racing without running into the immobile Williams. The entire field took advantage of the safety car period, and pitted a lap later for new tires and fuel. After two laps under the safety car, Räikkönen had bad luck as well when a heat shield, which had caught fire before in the first practice session, caught fire again, burning through the car's wiring and, judging by the on-board footage, cutting off the electricity to the engine; Räikkönen parked his McLaren at the exit of the Portier turn. Following this, the Finn opted to return to his private yacht as the race carried on.

With the safety car coming back into the pits, Alonso restarted in first place with Juan Pablo Montoya right behind him and Rubens Barrichello third; Coulthard and Schumacher were in the points as well. By lap 57, Alonso had a commanding lead of over 15 seconds to Montoya. Christian Klien retired a lap later, promoting his teammate David Coulthard to fifth and Michael Schumacher to sixth. Jacques Villeneuve got a drive-through penalty on lap 59 because he overtook under safety car conditions. Schumacher was closing fast on sixth-place Coulthard at about five seconds a lap, lapping in the 1:15's, (Note: 1 minute 15 seconds and decimal fractions.) but the Scot was over 35 seconds ahead of him. Barrichello, who was having a good Grand Prix up to lap 63, when he was given a drive through penalty for speeding in the pit lane; thus promoting Jarno Trulli up to third place and Coulthard to fourth. Barrichello came back in fifth place.

With a podium almost certain for Trulli, his Toyota team were pleased with the new car's performance but, on lap 72, the Italian had a hydraulic failure that shut the car down on the way up to the Casino, promoting Coulthard to third, who was now on course to take Red Bull's first podium, and moving Trulli's teammate, Ralf Schumacher, who had a very quiet Grand Prix, up into the points. By lap 75 and with only a few laps to go, Michael Schumacher had closed right up on his old Ferrari teammate, Rubens Barrichello, but despite a number of attempts, Schumacher failed to get past the Honda and finished fifth. Giancarlo Fisichella was sixth in the sister Renault; Nick Heidfeld was seventh, and Ralf Schumacher took the final point up for grabs in eighth.

On the podium, Coulthard wore a Superman cape, given that Red Bull was in that race promoting the superhero's newest film, Superman Returns. No champagne was sprayed due to death of Édouard Michelin on Friday.

=== Post-race ===
Schumacher's actions in the qualifying session would serve as ammunition for Schumacher's critics to go along with his actions in the 1994 Australian Grand Prix and the 1997 European Grand Prix, although Schumacher never accepted the allegations that he "parked" his Ferrari on purpose to block Fernando Alonso from taking pole position off him. However, this race is also regarded as one of Schumacher's best performances owing to the immense difficulty to overtake in Monaco, which did not stop him from overtaking at least 11 cars on the narrow track.

The Grand Prix was also the last time that Juan Pablo Montoya stepped onto a Formula One podium, and, as of 2025, the last for a Colombian driver, as well as Red Bull Racing's first podium finish. This would also be the last Monaco Grand Prix for Montoya and Jacques Villeneuve. Michael Schumacher did not return to Monaco until the 2010 Formula One season.

== Classification ==
=== Qualifying ===
| Pos. | No. | Driver | Constructor | Q1 | Q2 | Q3 | Grid |
|---|---|---|---|---|---|---|---|
| 1 | 1 | (Spain) Fernando Alonso | Renault | 1:14.232 | 1:13.622 | 1:13.962 | 1 |
| 2 | 9 | (Australia) Mark Webber | Williams-Cosworth | 1:14.305 | 1:13.728 | 1:14.082 | 2 |
| 3 | 3 | (Finland) Kimi Räikkönen | McLaren-Mercedes | 1:13.887 | 1:13.532 | 1:14.140 | 3 |
| 4 | 4 | (Colombia) Juan Pablo Montoya | McLaren-Mercedes | 1:14.483 | 1:14.295 | 1:14.664 | 4 |
| 5 | 11 | (Brazil) Rubens Barrichello | Honda | 1:14.766 | 1:14.312 | 1:15.804 | 5 |
| 6 | 8 | (Italy) Jarno Trulli | Toyota | 1:14.883 | 1:14.211 | 1:15.857 | 6 |
| 7 | 14 | (United Kingdom) David Coulthard | Red Bull-Ferrari | 1:15.090 | 1:13.687 | 1:16.426 | 7 |
| 8 | 10 | (Germany) Nico Rosberg | Williams-Cosworth | 1:14.888 | 1:13.909 | 1:16.636 | 8 |
| 9 | 2 | (Italy) Giancarlo Fisichella | Renault | 1:14.614 | 1:13.647 | 1:17.260 | 9^{1} |
| 10 | 7 | (Germany) Ralf Schumacher | Toyota | 1:14.412 | 1:14.398 | | 10 |
| 11 | 15 | (Austria) Christian Klien | Red Bull-Ferrari | 1:14.489 | 1:14.747 | | 11 |
| 12 | 20 | (Italy) Vitantonio Liuzzi | Toro Rosso-Cosworth | 1:15.314 | 1:14.969 | | 12 |
| 13 | 12 | (United Kingdom) Jenson Button | Honda | 1:15.085 | 1:14.982 | | 13 |
| 14 | 17 | (Canada) Jacques Villeneuve | BMW Sauber | 1:15.316 | 1:15.052 | | 14 |
| 15 | 16 | (Germany) Nick Heidfeld | BMW Sauber | 1:15.324 | 1:15.137 | | 15 |
| 16 | 19 | (Netherlands) Christijan Albers | MF1-Toyota | 1:15.598 | | | 16 |
| 17 | 18 | (Portugal) Tiago Monteiro | MF1-Toyota | 1:15.993 | | | 17 |
| 18 | 21 | (United States) Scott Speed | Toro Rosso-Cosworth | 1:16.236 | | | 18 |
| 19 | 22 | (Japan) Takuma Sato | Super Aguri-Honda | 1:17.276 | | | 19 |
| 20 | 23 | (France) Franck Montagny | Super Aguri-Honda | 1:17.502 | | | 20 |
| 21 | 6 | (Brazil) Felipe Massa | Ferrari | No time^{2} | | | 21 |
| EX | 5 | (Germany) Michael Schumacher | Ferrari | 1:15.118 | 1:13.709 | 1:13.898 | 22^{3} |

Notes

- ^1 – Giancarlo Fisichella set the 5th fastest time of 1:14.396. However, as he was found to have impeded David Coulthard on a flying lap, Fisichella had his three fastest lap times deleted, dropping him behind Montoya, Barrichello, Trulli, Coulthard and Rosberg. He thus started from 9th position.
- ^2 – Felipe Massa failed to set a qualifying time as his car was unfit to race after he damaged it during the first knock-out phase.
- ^3 – Michael Schumacher set the fastest time of 1:13.898. However, during the final lap of qualifying, Schumacher came to a stop at the La Rascasse hairpin, resulting in a yellow flag, meaning that other drivers could not go at maximum speed. After the session there was immediate complaint from the other teams that this has been a deliberate move by Ferrari to ensure Schumacher started in pole position, since Alonso had been on pace to beat his time. Although Schumacher insisted he had simply made an error, a stewards' inquiry resulted in all his qualifying times being deleted. Later on, Schumacher opted to start from the pitlane.

=== Race ===
| Pos. | No. | Driver | Constructor | Tyre | Laps | Time/Retired | Grid | Points |
|---|---|---|---|---|---|---|---|---|
| 1 | 1 | (Spain) Fernando Alonso | Renault | MI | 78 | 1:43:43.116 | 1 | 10 |
| 2 | 4 | (Colombia) Juan Pablo Montoya | McLaren-Mercedes | MI | 78 | +14.567 | 4 | 8 |
| 3 | 14 | (United Kingdom) David Coulthard | Red Bull-Ferrari | MI | 78 | +52.298 | 7 | 6 |
| 4 | 11 | (Brazil) Rubens Barrichello | Honda | MI | 78 | +53.337 | 5 | 5 |
| 5 | 5 | (Germany) Michael Schumacher | Ferrari | B | 78 | +53.830 | PL^{4} | 4 |
| 6 | 2 | (Italy) Giancarlo Fisichella | Renault | MI | 78 | +1:02.072 | 9 | 3 |
| 7 | 16 | (Germany) Nick Heidfeld | BMW Sauber | MI | 77 | +1 lap | 15 | 2 |
| 8 | 7 | (Germany) Ralf Schumacher | Toyota | B | 77 | +1 lap | 10 | 1 |
| 9 | 6 | (Brazil) Felipe Massa | Ferrari | B | 77 | +1 lap | 21 | |
| 10 | 20 | (Italy) Vitantonio Liuzzi | Toro Rosso-Cosworth | MI | 77 | +1 lap | 12 | |
| 11 | 12 | (United Kingdom) Jenson Button | Honda | MI | 77 | +1 lap | 13 | |
| 12 | 19 | (Netherlands) Christijan Albers | MF1-Toyota | B | 77 | +1 lap | 16 | |
| 13 | 21 | (United States) Scott Speed | Toro Rosso-Cosworth | MI | 77 | +1 lap | 18 | |
| 14 | 17 | (Canada) Jacques Villeneuve | BMW Sauber | MI | 77 | +1 lap | 14 | |
| 15 | 18 | (Portugal) Tiago Monteiro | MF1-Toyota | B | 76 | +2 laps | 17 | |
| 16 | 23 | (France) Franck Montagny | Super Aguri-Honda | B | 75 | +3 laps | 20 | |
| 17 | 8 | (Italy) Jarno Trulli | Toyota | B | 72 | Hydraulics | 6 | |
| Ret | 15 | (Austria) Christian Klien | Red Bull-Ferrari | MI | 56 | Transmission | 11 | |
| Ret | 10 | (Germany) Nico Rosberg | Williams-Cosworth | B | 51 | Throttle | 8 | |
| Ret | 3 | (Finland) Kimi Räikkönen | McLaren-Mercedes | MI | 50 | Fire | 3 | |
| Ret | 9 | (Australia) Mark Webber | Williams-Cosworth | MI | 48 | Exhaust | 2 | |
| Ret | 22 | (Japan) Takuma Sato | Super Aguri-Honda | B | 46 | Electrical | 19 | |

Notes

- ^4 – Michael Schumacher started the race from the pitlane.

== Championship standings after the race ==
Drivers' Championship standings

| | Pos. | Driver | Points |
|---|---|---|---|
| | 1 | (Spain) Fernando Alonso | 64 |
| | 2 | (Germany) Michael Schumacher | 43 |
| 1 | 3 | (Italy) Giancarlo Fisichella | 27 |
| 1 | 4 | (Finland) Kimi Räikkönen | 27 |
| 2 | 5 | (Colombia) Juan Pablo Montoya | 23 |

Constructors' Championship standings

| Pos. | Constructor | Points |
|---|---|---|
| 1 | (France) Renault | 91 |
| 2 | (Italy) Ferrari | 63 |
| 3 | (United Kingdom) McLaren-Mercedes | 50 |
| 4 | (Japan) Honda | 29 |
| 5 | (Germany) BMW Sauber | 14 |

- Note: Only the top five positions are included for both sets of standings.

== See also ==
- 2006 Monaco GP2 Series round

== Footnotes ==
| Previous race: 2006 Spanish Grand Prix | FIA Formula One World Championship; 2006 season | Next race: 2006 British Grand Prix |
| Previous race: 2005 Monaco Grand Prix | Monaco Grand Prix | Next race: 2007 Monaco Grand Prix |
