= 2009 Chinese Grand Prix =

Grand Prix race

Coordinates: 31°20′20″N 121°13′11″E

Race 3 of 17 in the 2009 Formula One World Championship
| ← Previous race | Next race → |

Race details
- Date: 19 April 2009
- Official name: 2009 Formula 1 Chinese Grand Prix
- Location: Shanghai International Circuit; Shanghai, People's Republic of China
- Course: Permanent racing facility
- Course length: 5.451 km (3.387 miles)
- Distance: 56 laps, 305.066 km (189.559 miles)
- Weather: Rain
- Attendance: 120,000 (Weekend)

Pole position
| Driver | (Germany) Sebastian Vettel | Red Bull-Renault |
- Time: 1:36.184

Fastest lap
| Driver | (Brazil) Rubens Barrichello | Brawn-Mercedes |
- Time: 1:52.592 on lap 42

Podium
| First | (Germany) Sebastian Vettel | Red Bull-Renault |
| Second | (Australia) Mark Webber | Red Bull-Renault |
| Third | (United Kingdom) Jenson Button | Brawn-Mercedes |

The 2009 Chinese Grand Prix (formally the 2009 Formula 1 Chinese Grand Prix) was a Formula One motor race held on 19 April 2009 at the Shanghai International Circuit, Shanghai, People's Republic of China. It was the third race of the 2009 Formula One season, a change from previous years, when it took place towards the end of the season.

Sebastian Vettel of Red Bull Racing won the race after starting from pole position. Both the race win and pole position were the first for the Red Bull team. Mark Webber, also of Red Bull, finished second followed by the two Brawn GP's of Jenson Button and Rubens Barrichello. McLaren's Heikki Kovalainen and Lewis Hamilton finished fifth and sixth, ahead of Toyota's Timo Glock and Scuderia Toro Rosso's Sébastien Buemi in seventh and eighth.

== Background ==
Heading into the event, Jenson Button of Brawn GP led the Drivers' Championship by 5 points from team-mate Rubens Barrichello and by a further 1.5 points from Jarno Trulli of Toyota. Brawn GP led Toyota by 8.5 points in the Constructors' Championship, with Renault and BMW Sauber a further 12.5 points behind.

Prior to the race, the Fédération Internationale de l'Automobile (FIA) International Court of Appeal confirmed the legality of the diffuser designs on the Brawn GP, Williams and Toyota team cars. Following this ruling, Renault and McLaren decided to run an updated diffuser design on their cars during the race. It was a hurried move by both teams, with Renault fitting it to Alonso's car for the first time on the Saturday before the race.

Ferrari announced that its team manager Luca Baldisserri was taken off the track operations to be replaced by race engineer Chris Dyer. The reshuffle was undertaken after Ferrari failed to score a point in the first two races of the season. Ferrari also announced that both its drivers, Kimi Räikkönen and Felipe Massa, would not use the Kinetic Energy Recovery System (KERS) in the race, citing reliability and safety issues. BMW Sauber, on the other hand, declared that Robert Kubica would use KERS for the first time during the Friday practice session. Kubica had not used the system in the first two races as there were concerns that the additional weight would put him at a disadvantage. However, Kubica opted not to run the device any further after Friday practice, as did the Renault team, reducing the number of KERS-equipped cars to three.

Italian teams and drivers indicated their support for the victims of 2009 L'Aquila earthquake through charity initiative "Abruzzo nel cuore" (Abruzzo in my heart) led by Italian drivers Jarno Trulli and Giancarlo Fisichella. Ferrari displayed the writing "Abruzzo nel cuore" on their cars while Trulli wore the logo on his overalls. The Toro Rosso cars had the message "Vicini All'Abruzzo" (All neighbouring Abruzzo) on their cars.

== Event report ==
=== Practice and qualifying ===
"The car instantly felt a bit better. I can feel more stability and downforce from the front. We've definitely made a step forward for this race. The car feels much stronger through the corners and I think we've got a very positive baseline for the rest of the weekend. My first run on the options felt quite consistent".

— Lewis Hamilton, on the performance his car during Friday's practice sessions

Three practice sessions were held prior to the race; two sessions on Friday April 17, 2009, each lasting 90 minutes, and one 60 minute session on Saturday April 18, 2009. World Champion Lewis Hamilton's McLaren was fastest at the end of the first practice session on Friday morning ahead of the Brawn GP cars of Jenson Button and Rubens Barrichello. Hamilton's McLaren team-mate Heikki Kovalainen was fourth fastest. Hamilton, whose McLaren MP4-24 car was fitted with a new interim diffuser and front wing, clocked his fastest lap of 1:37.334, around a tenth of a second clear of Button, around sixty minutes into the session. Red Bull's Mark Webber was fifth in the session, with Toyota's Trulli and Timo Glock sixth and eighth. Fernando Alonso, Nico Rosberg and Sébastien Bourdais completed the top ten lap times of the first session. Button was the fastest in Friday afternoon's second practice session, followed by Rosberg and Barrichello. Red Bull drivers Webber and Sebastian Vettel who headed the time-sheets during the initial phases of the session were eventually classified fourth and fifth fastest respectively. Toyota cars once again managed a competitive result as Trulli and Glock finished sixth and eighth with Williams' Kazuki Nakajima splitting them. The two McLarens could not recreate their results from the morning session with Kovalainen finishing ninth fastest and Hamilton 13th.

Williams' Rosberg was quickest in the practice session on Saturday morning. Rosberg, who slid off the track onto the gravel at the start of the session, timed 1:36.133 to top the timesheets, followed by Trulli and Hamilton. Button finished fourth with Renault's Nelson Piquet Jr. clocking the fifth fastest lap time for the session. Piquet's team-mate Fernando Alonso on the other hand, whose Renault R29 car was fitted with new diffuser and without the KERS, could only manage a time good enough for 19th fastest. BMW Sauber's Robert Kubica who also removed his KERS for this session, improved significantly from his results in the earlier two sessions. Timo Glock's Toyota TF109 car faced gearbox problems early in the session and had to change the gearbox for the upcoming qualifying session. Glock received a five-place grid penalty for this gearbox change.

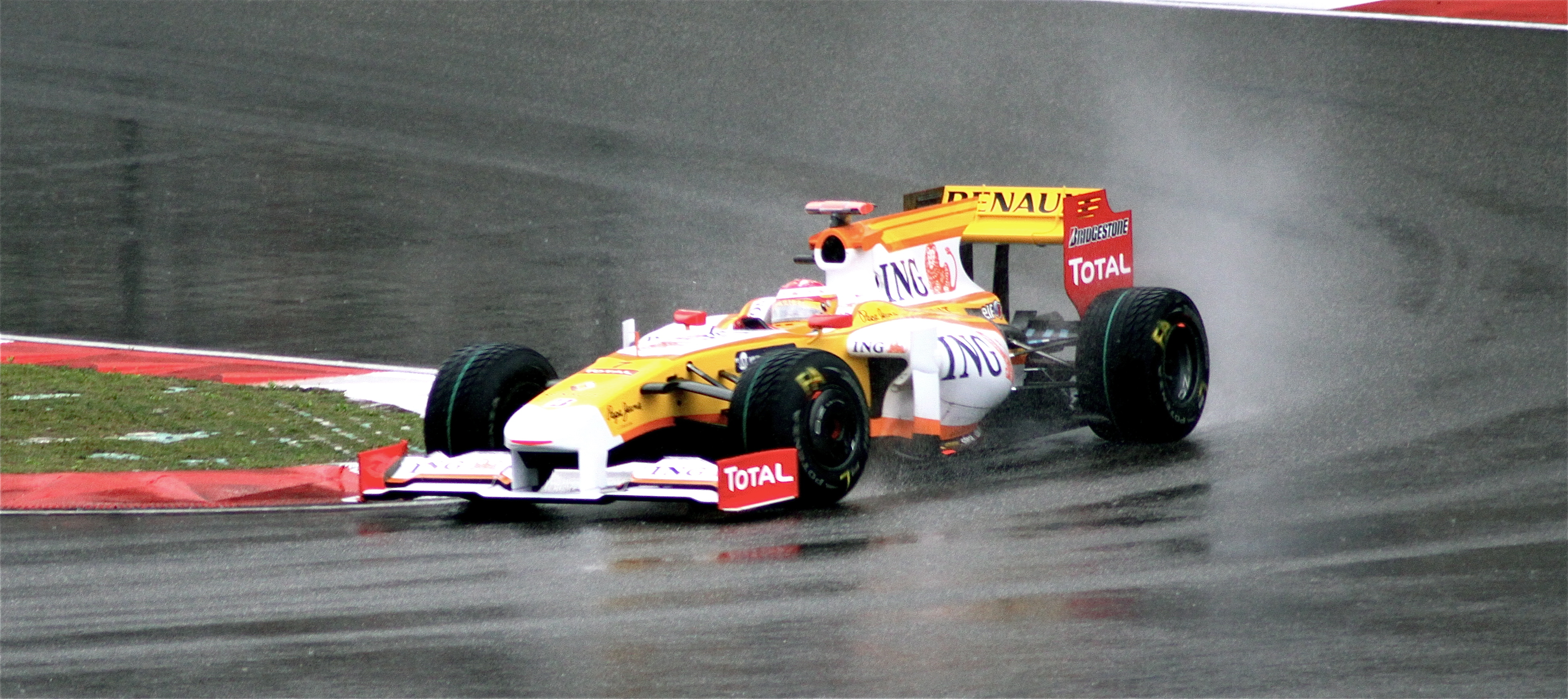
Fernando Alonso qualified his Renault second showing the Renault had improved.

"...if you only have one lap and if you have [sic] any mistake, you go wide or whatever, there is no second chance and it means it is the end. It was not so easy but I am very, very happy. Unbelievable we made it to pole position in the end."

— Sebastian Vettel, in post-qualifying press conference.

The qualifying session on Saturday afternoon was split into three parts. Sebastian Vettel achieved his second career pole position – and the first for his Red Bull Racing team – at the end of the session. Vettel, who ran only one flying lap each in the final two parts of qualifying, due to problems with the driveshafts of his car, edged out Fernando Alonso by two-tenths of a second in the final part of qualifying. Red Bull's other driver Mark Webber finished third, immediately ahead of Brawn GP cars of Barrichello and Button. Kimi Räikkönen, after a disappointing performance during practice, secured eighth position behind Trulli in sixth and Rosberg in seventh place. Hamilton and Toro Rosso's Sébastien Buemi completed the top ten on the grid. Nick Heidfeld, Heikki Kovalainen, Felipe Massa, Timo Glock and Kazuki Nakajima made up 11th to 15th on the grid. Drivers eliminated in the first qualifying session and classified 16th to 20th were Sébastien Bourdais, Nelson Piquet Jr., Robert Kubica, Adrian Sutil and Giancarlo Fisichella. Due to his five-place penalty, Glock was placed 19th and Nakajima, Bourdais, Piquet, Kubica and Sutil were each promoted by one position in the revised starting grid.

=== Race ===
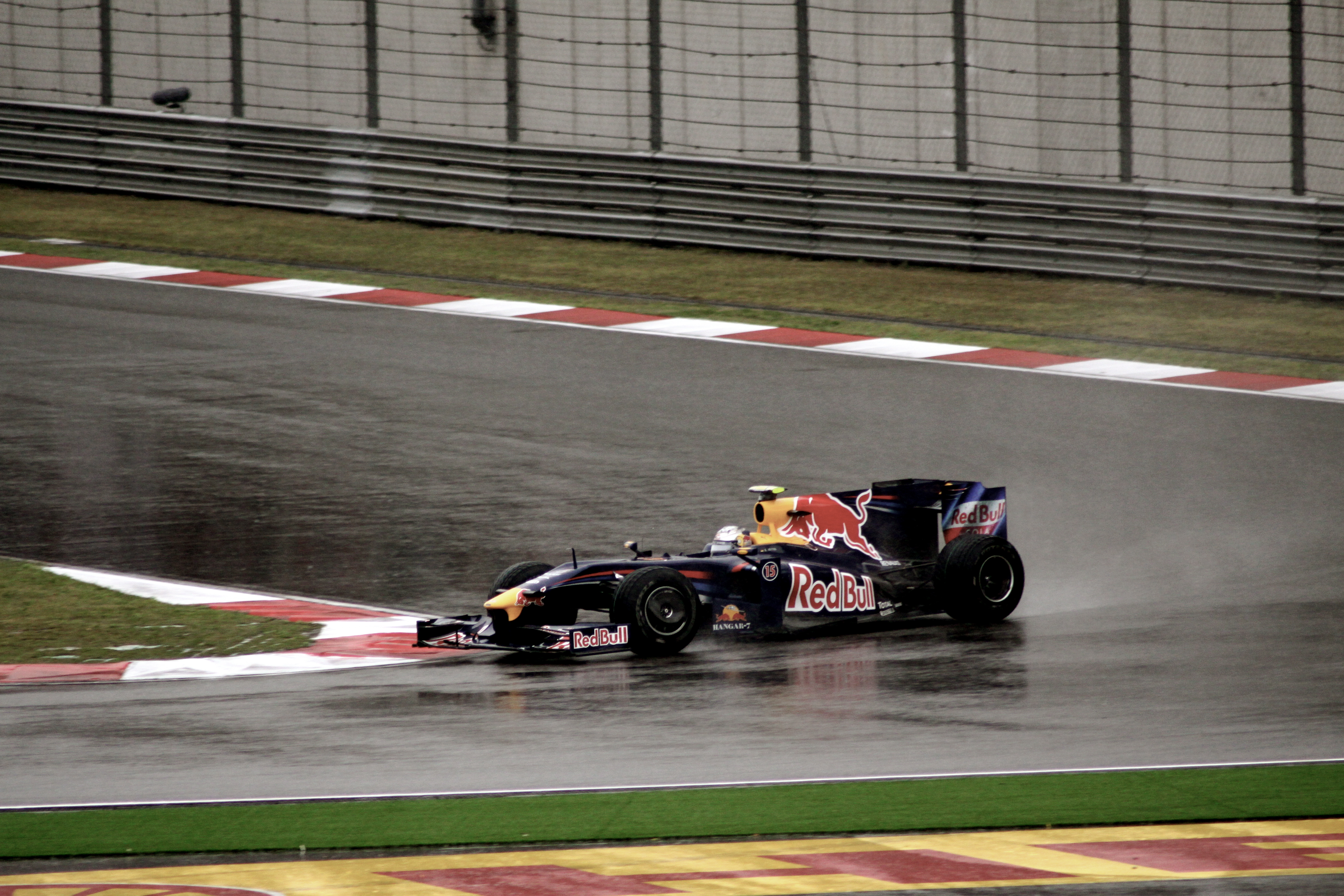
Sebastian Vettel took Red Bull Racing's first victory in Formula One.

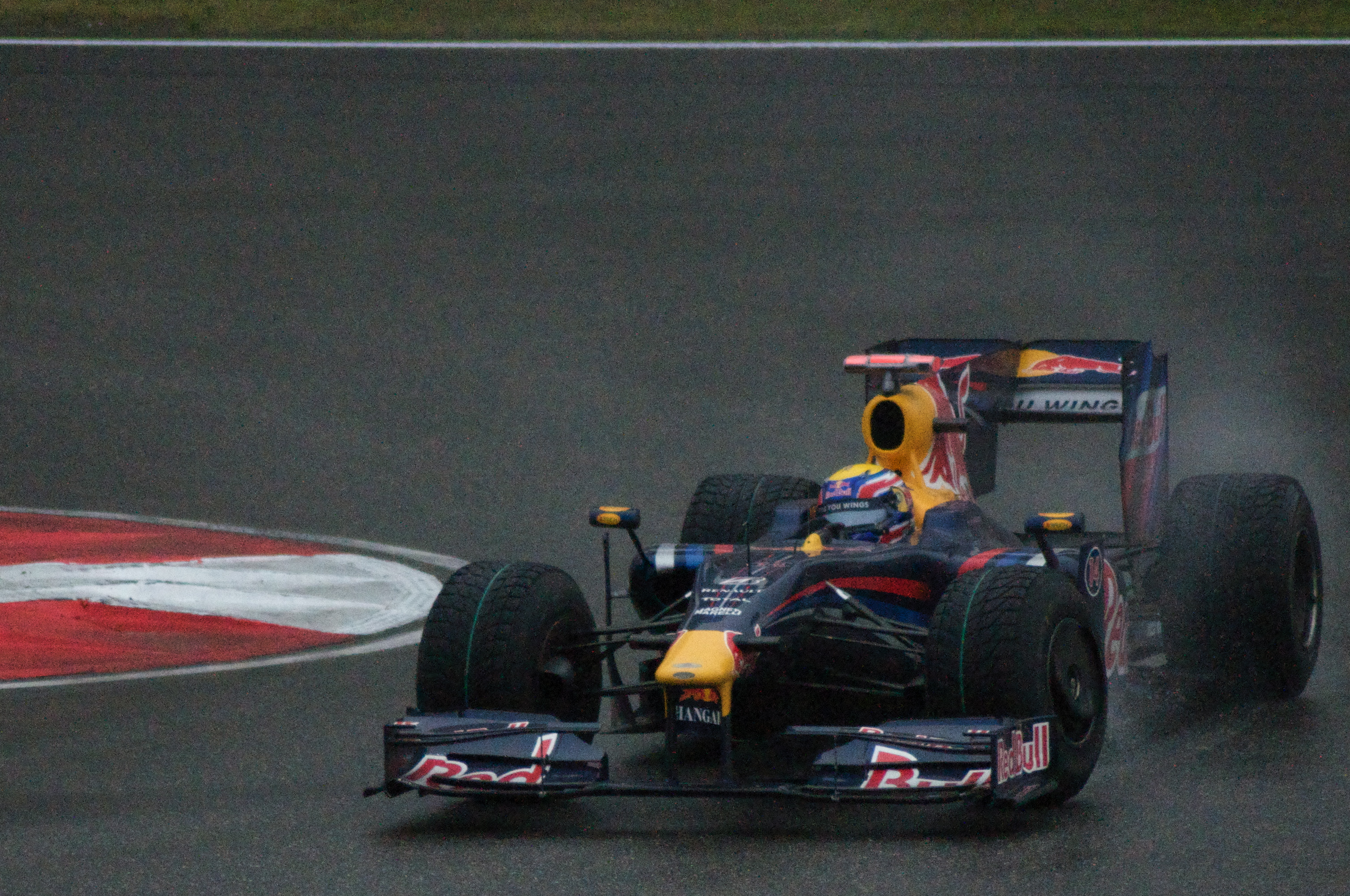
Mark Webber completed Red Bull's perfect race by finishing second.

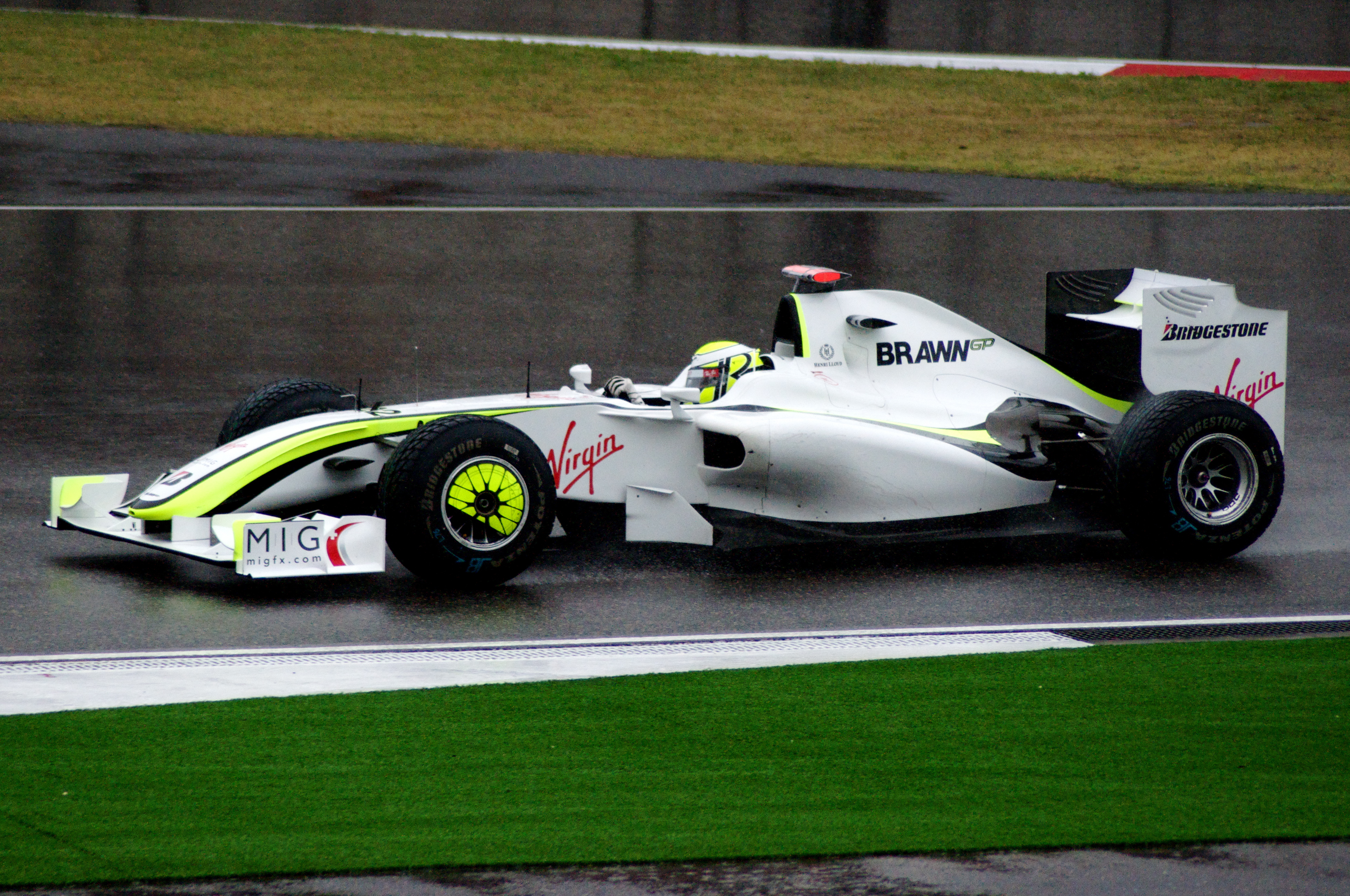
Jenson Button maintained his championship lead by finishing in third place.

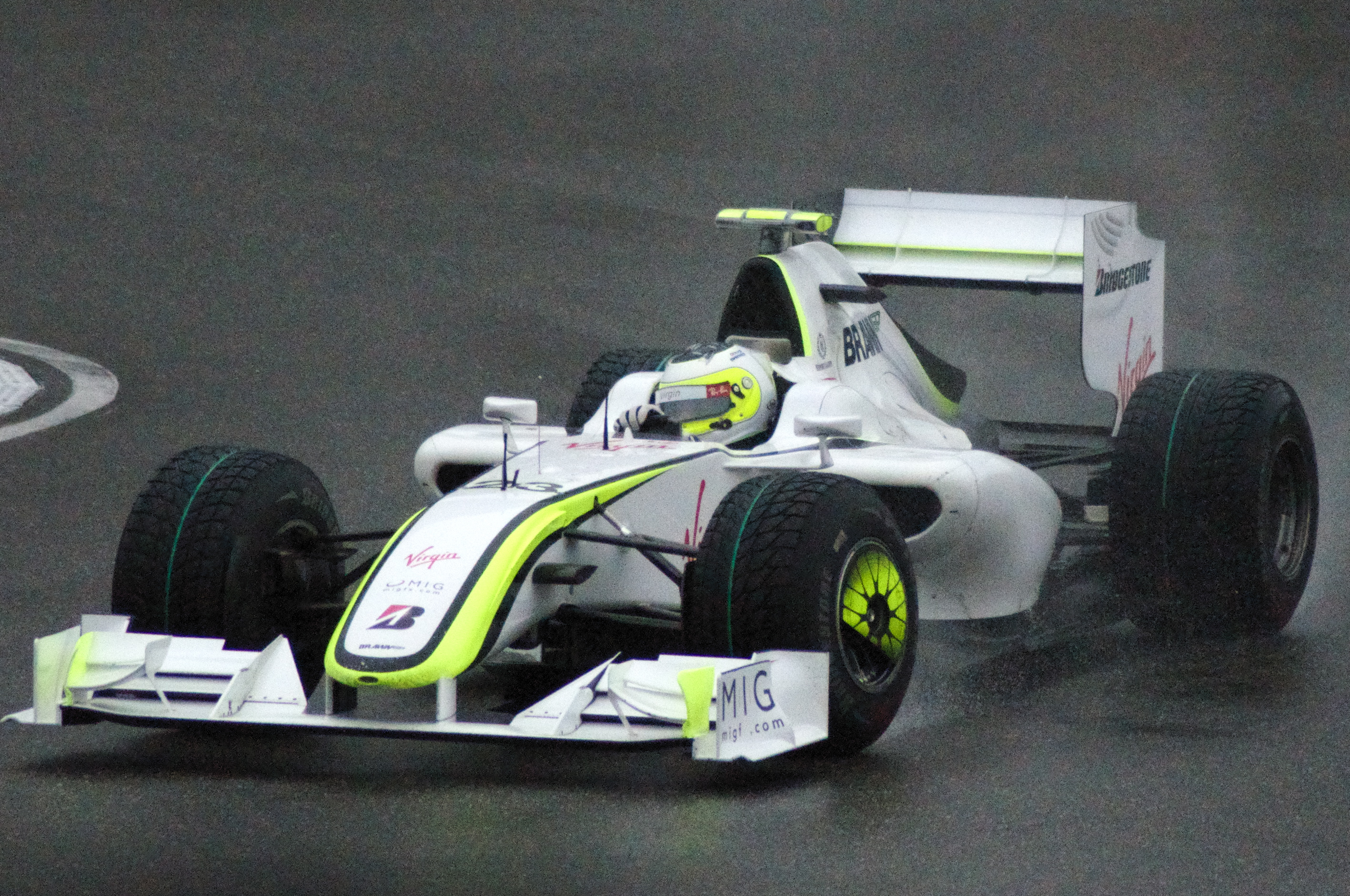
Rubens Barrichello clocked in the fastest lap time even though only coming fourth.

Robert Kubica and Timo Glock started from the pit lane. Due to heavy rain, the first eight laps of the race were run under the safety car. Sutil, Rosberg and Alonso made their first pit stops during the safety car period so they were at the back of the pack when the green flag was shown. Lewis Hamilton made early progress and overtook Jarno Trulli and Kimi Räikkönen, before he spun on lap 12 and dropped back to 10th. Meanwhile, Jenson Button overtook Rubens Barrichello for third after the Brazilian ran wide.

Trulli and Räikkönen were quite slow in the early laps and they dropped back. Hamilton made progress once again and was 7th on lap 11 before another mistake which dropped him one place down. Webber made his first scheduled stop on lap 14 and Vettel on the following lap. At this point, Button led from Barrichello, Vettel, Buemi, Massa and Webber.

On lap 17, Robert Kubica crashed into Jarno Trulli on the run to the last corner. Kubica damaged his front wing and Trulli his rear wing, which caused him to crawl one lap slowly into the pits to retire. The safety car was deployed due to debris left on the track. While avoiding the slowing Trulli, Vettel suffered a minor collision with Buemi, who damaged his front wing in the process. Buemi made his pit stop at that point, along with both Brawn GP drivers and Sutil, who had his second stop at this point and was set to finish the race from this point.

Felipe Massa suffered an electrical problem during the safety car period and he stopped on the back straight. At the restart, Sébastien Bourdais spun before the green flag and dropped a number of places. The race continued with Vettel leading from Button while Webber, Räikkönen, Hamilton, Barrichello, Kovalainen and Buemi rounded out the top eight.

Piquet crashed on lap 28 and damaged his front wing but was able to continue. Button missed his braking point at the hairpin on the following lap, allowing Webber through. Webber ran wide two laps later and Button was ahead again, until Webber passed him from the outside in turn 7.

Hamilton made his only scheduled stop on lap 33, and his team-mate Kovalainen followed a lap later. Vettel stopped on lap 37 and Webber on lap 39, while two Brawn cars ran until laps 42 (Button) and 43 (Barrichello). Buemi was the last driver to make a scheduled stop, on lap 45 and after that race order was: Vettel, Webber, Button, Barrichello, Hamilton, Kovalainen, Sutil and Heidfeld. Nico Rosberg had tried intermediate tyres on his second stop but he spun soon after and pitted again for full wets.

Hamilton continued with a lot of mistakes so Kovalainen and Sutil were able to pass him. Then on lap 51, Sutil crashed heavily before turn 5, ending his race. Heidfeld had to avoid Sutil's tyre which had bounced back to the track and Glock and Buemi went past him.

Vettel stayed in the lead until the end, taking his second Grand Prix victory and his first for Red Bull Racing. It was the first ever win for Red Bull as a constructor. His team-mate Webber achieved his best career result with second place while Button got his third successive podium with third place. Barrichello finished fourth, Kovalainen fifth, Hamilton sixth, Glock seventh and Buemi eighth. A total of 17 drivers were classified, including Sutil who had retired.

During the podium ceremony, there was confusion when "God Save the Queen", the British national anthem was played for winning constructor Red Bull instead of "Land der Berge, Land am Strome", the Austrian national anthem. Red Bull Racing has been based in the UK since its foundation in 2005, but has been registered with the Austrian national racing authority since 2007, reflecting its Austrian ownership. When Vettel recorded Red Bull's second win at the 2009 British Grand Prix, the Austrian anthem was played. It was also the first Grand Prix victory for the Milton Keynes-based Formula One team since the 1999 European Grand Prix when it was named Stewart Grand Prix.

== Classification ==
=== Qualifying ===
Cars that used KERS are marked with "‡"

| Pos | No | Driver | Constructor | Part 1 | Part 2 | Part 3 | Grid |
|---|---|---|---|---|---|---|---|
| 1 | 15 | (Germany) Sebastian Vettel | Red Bull-Renault | 1:36.565 | 1:35.130 | 1:36.184 | 1 |
| 2 | 7 | (Spain) Fernando Alonso | Renault | 1:36.443 | 1:35.803 | 1:36.381 | 2 |
| 3 | 14 | (Australia) Mark Webber | Red Bull-Renault | 1:35.751 | 1:35.173 | 1:36.466 | 3 |
| 4 | 23 | (Brazil) Rubens Barrichello | Brawn-Mercedes | 1:35.701 | 1:35.503 | 1:36.493 | 4 |
| 5 | 22 | (United Kingdom) Jenson Button | Brawn-Mercedes | 1:35.533 | 1:35.556 | 1:36.532 | 5 |
| 6 | 9 | (Italy) Jarno Trulli | Toyota | 1:36.308 | 1:35.645 | 1:36.835 | 6 |
| 7 | 16 | (Germany) Nico Rosberg | Williams-Toyota | 1:35.941 | 1:35.809 | 1:37.397 | 7 |
| 8 | 4 | (Finland) Kimi Räikkönen | Ferrari | 1:36.137 | 1:35.856 | 1:38.089 | 8 |
| 9 | 1‡ | (United Kingdom) Lewis Hamilton | McLaren-Mercedes | 1:35.776 | 1:35.740 | 1:38.595 | 9 |
| 10 | 12 | (Switzerland) Sébastien Buemi | Toro Rosso-Ferrari | 1:36.284 | 1:35.965 | 1:39.321 | 10 |
| 11 | 6‡ | (Germany) Nick Heidfeld | BMW Sauber | 1:36.525 | 1:35.975 | | 11 |
| 12 | 2‡ | (Finland) Heikki Kovalainen | McLaren-Mercedes | 1:36.646 | 1:36.032 | | 12 |
| 13 | 3 | (Brazil) Felipe Massa | Ferrari | 1:36.178 | 1:36.033 | | 13 |
| 14 | 10 | (Germany) Timo Glock | Toyota | 1:36.364 | 1:36.066 | | 19 |
| 15 | 17 | (Japan) Kazuki Nakajima | Williams-Toyota | 1:36.673 | 1:36.193 | | 14 |
| 16 | 11 | (France) Sébastien Bourdais | Toro Rosso-Ferrari | 1:36.906 | | | 15 |
| 17 | 8 | (Brazil) Nelson Piquet Jr. | Renault | 1:36.908 | | | 16 |
| 18 | 5 | (Poland) Robert Kubica | BMW Sauber | 1:36.966 | | | 17 |
| 19 | 20 | (Germany) Adrian Sutil | Force India-Mercedes | 1:37.669 | | | 18 |
| 20 | 21 | (Italy) Giancarlo Fisichella | Force India-Mercedes | 1:37.672 | | | 20 |

- ^1Timo Glock was issued a 5 place grid-penalty for changing a gearbox during Saturday practice.

=== Race ===
| Pos | No | Driver | Constructor | Laps | Time/Retired | Grid | Points |
|---|---|---|---|---|---|---|---|
| 1 | 15 | (Germany) Sebastian Vettel | Red Bull-Renault | 56 | 1:57:43.485 | 1 | 10 |
| 2 | 14 | (Australia) Mark Webber | Red Bull-Renault | 56 | +10.970 | 3 | 8 |
| 3 | 22 | (United Kingdom) Jenson Button | Brawn-Mercedes | 56 | +44.975 | 5 | 6 |
| 4 | 23 | (Brazil) Rubens Barrichello | Brawn-Mercedes | 56 | +1:03.704 | 4 | 5 |
| 5 | 2‡ | (Finland) Heikki Kovalainen | McLaren-Mercedes | 56 | +1:05.102 | 12 | 4 |
| 6 | 1‡ | (United Kingdom) Lewis Hamilton | McLaren-Mercedes | 56 | +1:11.866 | 9 | 3 |
| 7 | 10 | (Germany) Timo Glock | Toyota | 56 | +1:14.476 | 19 | 2 |
| 8 | 12 | (Switzerland) Sébastien Buemi | Toro Rosso-Ferrari | 56 | +1:16.439 | 10 | 1 |
| 9 | 7 | (Spain) Fernando Alonso | Renault | 56 | +1:24.309 | 2 | |
| 10 | 4 | (Finland) Kimi Räikkönen | Ferrari | 56 | +1:31.750 | 8 | |
| 11 | 11 | (France) Sébastien Bourdais | Toro Rosso-Ferrari | 56 | +1:34.156 | 15 | |
| 12 | 6‡ | (Germany) Nick Heidfeld | BMW Sauber | 56 | +1:35.834 | 11 | |
| 13 | 5 | (Poland) Robert Kubica | BMW Sauber | 56 | +1:46.853 | PL | |
| 14 | 21 | (Italy) Giancarlo Fisichella | Force India-Mercedes | 55 | +1 Lap | 20 | |
| 15 | 16 | (Germany) Nico Rosberg | Williams-Toyota | 55 | +1 Lap | 7 | |
| 16 | 8 | (Brazil) Nelson Piquet Jr. | Renault | 54 | +2 Laps | 16 | |
| 17 | 20 | (Germany) Adrian Sutil | Force India-Mercedes | 50 | Accident | 18 | |
| Ret | 17 | (Japan) Kazuki Nakajima | Williams-Toyota | 43 | Transmission | 14 | |
| Ret | 3 | (Brazil) Felipe Massa | Ferrari | 20 | Electrical | 13 | |
| Ret | 9 | (Italy) Jarno Trulli | Toyota | 18 | Collision damage | 6 | |

== Championship standings after the race ==
Drivers' Championship standings

| | Pos. | Driver | Points |
|---|---|---|---|
| | 1 | (United Kingdom) Jenson Button | 21 |
| | 2 | (Brazil) Rubens Barrichello | 15 |
| 13 | 3 | (Germany) Sebastian Vettel | 10 |
| | 4 | (Germany) Timo Glock | 10 |
| 4 | 5 | (Australia) Mark Webber | 9.5 |

Constructors' Championship standings

| | Pos. | Constructor | Points |
|---|---|---|---|
| | 1 | (United Kingdom) Brawn-Mercedes | 36 |
| 5 | 2 | (Austria) Red Bull-Renault | 19.5 |
| 1 | 3 | (Japan) Toyota | 18.5 |
| 4 | 4 | (United Kingdom) McLaren-Mercedes | 8 |
| 2 | 5 | (Germany) BMW Sauber | 4 |

- Note: Only the top five positions are included for both sets of standings.

| Previous race: 2009 Malaysian Grand Prix | FIA Formula One World Championship; 2009 season | Next race: 2009 Bahrain Grand Prix |
| Previous race: 2008 Chinese Grand Prix | Chinese Grand Prix | Next race: 2010 Chinese Grand Prix |
