= Luca Baldisserri =

Italian automotive engineer (born 1962)

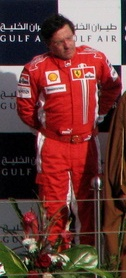
- Baldisserri on the 2007 Bahrain Grand Prix podium
- Born: Luca Baldisserri; 11 December 1962 (age 63); Bologna, Italy
- Occupations: Scuderia Ferrari (1989–2015); Williams (20172019)

Luca Baldisserri (born 11 December 1962) is an Italian engineer who is best known for being the chief track engineer for Scuderia Ferrari between 2007 and 2015.

== Career ==
=== Scuderia Ferrari ===
Baldisserri joined Scuderia Ferrari in 1989, and in 1995 became Gerhard Berger's race engineer. He worked with Eddie Irvine and later Michael Schumacher. He was Schumacher's race engineer when he won his third World Drivers' Championship in 2000. They continued this partnership to the 2001 and 2002 championships, although Chris Dyer engineered the last three races of the season when the championship was already won.

Between 2003 and 2006, Baldisserri sat alongside Ross Brawn on the Ferrari pitwall leading the teams race strategy. At the end of 2006, Brawn took a sabbatical from Ferrari and Baldisserri took over as Chief Track Engineer. When Brawn joined Honda, Baldisserri's role was made permanent. At the 2009 Chinese Grand Prix, Baldisserri was relieved of duty and moved into a factory role before becoming the Ferrari Driver Academy Manager, a role he held until 2015.

=== Lance Stroll ===
In December 2015, Baldisserri left Scuderia Ferrari and worked exclusively with Canadian driver Lance Stroll. Stroll at the time had moved to the Williams F1 Team young driver development programme from Ferrari's. Baldisserri worked with Stroll on his 2016 Formula Three championship victory. In late 2017, he was Stroll's race engineer at Williams and for the 2018 season he held the role alongside James Urwin.

=== After Formula One ===
Following his stint with Stroll at Williams, Baldisseri joined Global Racing Service in 2020.
