= 2007 Spanish Grand Prix =

Coordinates: 41°34′9.9″N 2°15′26.9″E

Race 4 of 17 in the 2007 Formula One World Championship
← Previous race	Next race →
- Circuit de Catalunya in Barcelona

Race details
- Date: 13 May 2007
- Official name: Formula 1 Gran Premio de España Telefónica 2007
- Location: Circuit de Catalunya, Montmeló, Catalonia, Spain
- Course: Permanent racing facility
- Course length: 4.655 km (2.892 miles)
- Distance: 65 laps, 302.449 km (187.934 miles)
- Scheduled distance: 66 laps, 307.164 km (190.938 miles)
- Weather: Sunny and warm
- Attendance: 140,700

Pole position
Driver	(Brazil) Felipe Massa	Ferrari
- Time: 1:21.421

Fastest lap
Driver	(Brazil) Felipe Massa	Ferrari
- Time: 1:22.680 on lap 14

Podium
First	(Brazil) Felipe Massa	Ferrari
Second	(United Kingdom) Lewis Hamilton	McLaren-Mercedes
Third	(Spain) Fernando Alonso	McLaren-Mercedes

The 2007 Spanish Grand Prix (formally the Formula 1 Gran Premio de España Telefónica 2007) was a Formula One motor race, the fourth race of the 2007 FIA Formula One World Championship, won by Felipe Massa. It was held on 13 May 2007 at the Circuit de Catalunya in Spain.

== Report ==
=== Background ===
Prior to the Spanish Grand Prix, the Circuit de Catalunya went through some circuit revisions to encourage overtaking and make the racing more exciting and also to improve safety standards. The revisions included a chicane placed at the final two corners. "Although I have always really enjoyed the final two corners and their speed, the new chicane at the end of the track will hopefully lead to more overtaking during the race, which is great for the spectators," Fernando Alonso commented. Because of the revisions, the fastest lap of the race, recorded by Massa, was fractionally over six seconds longer than the fastest lap of the race in 2006, also recorded by Massa.

Just over a week before the weekend of the grand prix, there was an organised test session at the track for four days, with primary focus on aerodynamic set-ups. However, due to heavy rain on the Tuesday, many teams abandoned their initial test schedule and instead looked to focus on wet-weather set-ups. Both Ferrari and Red Bull took advantage of these conditions and scored first and second fastest times respectively on both Tuesday and Wednesday. The wet weather eventually led to a fourth day of testing, in which Red Bull driver David Coulthard broke Ferrari's run and set the fastest time by 0.2 seconds.

The aerodynamic focus was evident in the unveiling of two new and radical front aero designs by both the Honda and McLaren teams. Both teams would be understandably reluctant to release figures to support their reasoning for using such radical winglets, although McLaren's consistent speed throughout the testing is noted by only having out-paced championship rivals Ferrari once. Honda, however, ended up half a second down on the nearest car on the final day of testing where they unveiled their "elephant ear" winglets. McLaren punctuated their need for aero testing over rain testing by withdrawing on the rained-out Tuesday.

=== Practice ===
Lewis Hamilton headed the first practice session in his McLaren, just 0.4seconds ahead of team-mate Fernando Alonso, who was in front of his home crowd. Kimi Räikkönen was third in his Ferrari, but his team-mate Felipe Massa was demoted to fifth in the closing moments, as Robert Kubica took fourth in his BMW. Anthony Davidson finished sixth in his Super Aguri, with the Toyotas of Jarno Trulli and Ralf Schumacher in 7th and 8th. Nico Rosberg and Jenson Button rounded out the top ten.

Alonso turned the tables on Hamilton in the second practice session, with Alonso three tenths ahead of the rest of the field, but Hamilton was back in fifth. McLaren team boss Ron Dennis said that they had made the "best possible start to the weekend". The Renaults of Giancarlo Fisichella and Heikki Kovalainen produced a late surge to finish 2nd and 3rd, ahead of both Ferraris, who were down in 4th and 6th. However, Renault's engineering director Pat Symonds played down the times, saying they were "done with a lower fuel load" and "are therefore unrepresentatively high in the timesheets". Behind the top three teams, Nico Rosberg was again in the top ten in his Williams, with engineering director Patrick Head saying they've been "playing catch up today", after a high-speed crash by Rosberg during the Barcelona test. Although out of the top six, Nick Heidfeld said his eighth place "doesn't reflect how competitive we are", with Webber and Scott Speed rounding out the top ten.

It was the second McLaren one-two of the weekend as Hamilton took first ahead of Alonso in Saturday practice. Behind them, both BMWs were in front of both Ferraris. They were split by David Coulthard in the Red Bull. Anthony Davidson put in another good practice performance with eighth in his Super Aguri, with Nico Rosberg and Heikki Kovalainen rounding out the top ten.

=== Qualifying ===
Fernando Alonso looked likely to take pole at his home Grand Prix. Alonso crossed the line at the end of Q3 to take pole, unaware that Felipe Massa still had one lap in hand. The Brazilian pipped pole from the home hero by three-one hundredths of a second.

=== Race ===
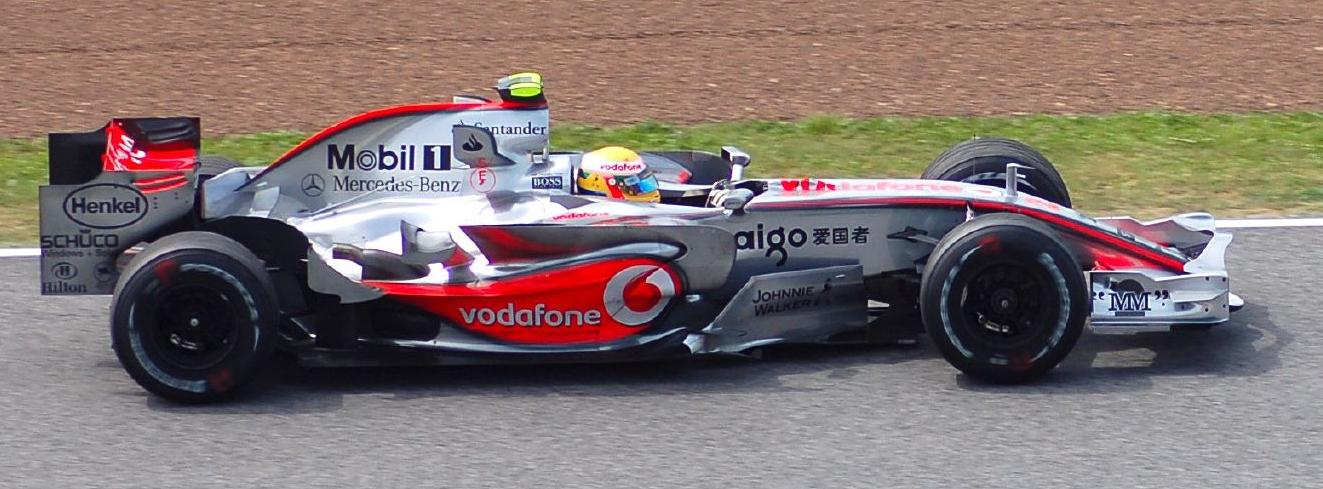
Lewis Hamilton's second place put him into the lead of the championship without any race wins at the time.

The first start was aborted when Toyota driver Jarno Trulli stalled on the grid, forcing another formation lap and decreasing the race length to 65 laps. The race got underway shortly thereafter with both Felipe Massa and World Champion Fernando Alonso going into the corner ahead of their team-mates Kimi Räikkönen and Lewis Hamilton respectively. This order was short-lived as Alonso and Massa touched briefly going into the first corner, sending Alonso over the gravel with him returning to the track behind Räikkönen's Ferrari in fourth.

The first lap saw the first of eight retirements, that being Austrian Alexander Wurz as he was caught unaware by Toyota driver Ralf Schumacher braking suddenly to avoid Giancarlo Fisichella, as the Italian returned to the track after a minor off. Six laps later, as Massa was building a lead over Hamilton, Australian Red Bull driver Mark Webber retired when the hydraulic problems that plagued him during qualifying returned. A lap later, Trulli, who had started from the pit lane after stalling on the grid, also pulled into the pits and retired due to a failing fuel line.

On lap nine the electrics on Kimi Räikkönen's Ferrari failed, leaving him to coast to the pits from halfway around the track. Scott Speed's tyre failed spectacularly on the main straight shortly afterwards, leaving debris that remained there for the rest of the race.

As the first round of pit-stops took place, a fire briefly lit into full blaze on the back the remaining Ferrari of race leader Felipe Massa. The car was undamaged and after all the cars had stopped he was still some ten seconds ahead of Briton Lewis Hamilton. The remaining Toro Rosso of Vitantonio Liuzzi suffered similar hydraulic problems to those befell him in qualifying.

Italian Renault driver, Giancarlo Fisichella, battled with the Honda of Rubens Barrichello, passing the Brazilian after the second stops. While most drivers negotiated their second stops smoothly, BMW Sauber driver Nick Heidfeld lost a probable fourth position, which would have been his fourth in as many races, when his right front wheel was not properly secured during the pit stop. He coasted around the circuit for another stop and returned to the track more than a lap down.

More drama followed the Hondas as drivers Barrichello and Jenson Button touched as the latter exited the pits. Button was forced to return to the pits for a new front wing whilst Barrichello raced on, futilely attempting to catch Fisichella's Renault.

Through all the retirements and bungled pit-stops, Red Bull driver David Coulthard raced to what became a strong fifth position despite losing third gear in the team's new quick shift gearbox. Despite Williams driver Rosberg's best attempts, he was unable to pass the Scot. This was Red Bull's strongest result so far this season and highlighted the improving performance of the Adrian Newey designed RB3 chassis.

Renault's day went sour after problems with the refuelling rig meant that both Fisichella and Kovalainen had to pit again forcing Heikki down to 7th of what would have been a probable 5th and pushed Giancarlo out of the points altogether. He still remained ahead of the Hondas of Button and Barrichello and the Super Aguri for Anthony Davidson.

Ralf Schumacher retired with 20 laps remaining in the race. On American SPEED Channel coverage, commentator Bob Varsha joked that Schumacher was pitting from "somewhere around Andorra" alluding to the German's very slow pace all day.

Massa went on to win the race by almost seven seconds over the McLaren pair of Hamilton and Alonso, respectively second and third. This result meant that Hamilton, after a Formula One career of only four races, led the championship despite never previously taking a race victory. He is the youngest driver to do so, taking the record from McLaren team founder, Bruce McLaren.

Pole Robert Kubica made up for his team-mate's gearbox induced retirement by continuing the team's run of fourth-place finishes, while Aguri Suzuki's Japanese Super Aguri team notched up their first ever points with an eighth place by Takuma Sato. Sato scored his first point since the 2005 Hungarian Grand Prix. "I just cannot describe how happy we are and a point means much more than anything else for us and this is an absolutely fantastic result" Sato went on to say.

== Classification ==
=== Qualifying ===
Pos.	No.	Driver	Constructor	Q1	Q2	Q3	Grid
1	5	(Brazil) Felipe Massa	Ferrari	1:21.375	1:20.597	1:21.421	1
2	1	(Spain) Fernando Alonso	McLaren-Mercedes	1:21.609	1:20.797	1:21.451	2
3	6	(Finland) Kimi Räikkönen	Ferrari	1:21.802	1:20.741	1:21.723	3
4	2	(United Kingdom) Lewis Hamilton	McLaren-Mercedes	1:21.120	1:20.713	1:21.785	4
5	10	(Poland) Robert Kubica	BMW Sauber	1:21.941	1:21.381	1:22.253	5
6	12	(Italy) Jarno Trulli	Toyota	1:22.501	1:21.554	1:22.324	6
7	9	(Germany) Nick Heidfeld	BMW Sauber	1:21.625	1:21.113	1:22.389	7
8	4	(Finland) Heikki Kovalainen	Renault	1:21.790	1:21.623	1:22.568	8
9	14	(United Kingdom) David Coulthard	Red Bull-Renault	1:22.491	1:21.488	1:22.749	9
10	3	(Italy) Giancarlo Fisichella	Renault	1:22.064	1:21.677	1:22.881	10
11	16	(Germany) Nico Rosberg	Williams-Toyota	1:21.943	1:21.968		11
12	8	(Brazil) Rubens Barrichello	Honda	1:22.502	1:22.097		12
13	22	(Japan) Takuma Sato	Super Aguri-Honda	1:22.090	1:22.115		13
14	7	(United Kingdom) Jenson Button	Honda	1:22.503	1:22.120		14
15	23	(United Kingdom) Anthony Davidson	Super Aguri-Honda	1:22.295	No time^{2}		15
16	18	(Italy) Vitantonio Liuzzi	Toro Rosso-Ferrari	1:22.508	No time^{3}		16
17	11	(Germany) Ralf Schumacher	Toyota	1:22.666			17
18	17	(Austria) Alexander Wurz	Williams-Toyota	1:22.769			18
19	15	(Australia) Mark Webber	Red Bull-Renault	1:23.398			19
20	20	(Germany) Adrian Sutil	Spyker-Ferrari	1:23.811			20
21	21	(Netherlands) Christijan Albers	Spyker-Ferrari	1:23.990			21
22	19	(United States) Scott Speed	Toro Rosso-Ferrari	No time^{1}			22

Notes

- ^1 – Scott Speed failed to set a time in Q1 due to a gearbox problem.
- ^2 – Anthony Davidson failed to set a time in Q2 because he went off-track turn 9.
- ^3 – Vitantonio Liuzzi failed to set a time in Q2 due to a gearbox problem.

=== Race ===
Pos.	No.	Driver	Constructor	Laps	Time/Retired	Grid	Points
1	5	(Brazil) Felipe Massa	Ferrari	65	1:31:36.230	1	10
2	2	(United Kingdom) Lewis Hamilton	McLaren-Mercedes	65	+6.790	4	8
3	1	(Spain) Fernando Alonso	McLaren-Mercedes	65	+17.456	2	6
4	10	(Poland) Robert Kubica	BMW Sauber	65	+31.615	5	5
5	14	(United Kingdom) David Coulthard	Red Bull-Renault	65	+58.331	9	4
6	16	(Germany) Nico Rosberg	Williams-Toyota	65	+59.538	11	3
7	4	(Finland) Heikki Kovalainen	Renault	65	+1:02.128	8	2
8	22	(Japan) Takuma Sato	Super Aguri-Honda	64	+1 Lap	13	1
9	3	(Italy) Giancarlo Fisichella	Renault	64	+1 Lap	10	
10	8	(Brazil) Rubens Barrichello	Honda	64	+1 Lap	12	
11	23	(United Kingdom) Anthony Davidson	Super Aguri-Honda	64	+1 Lap	15	
12	7	(United Kingdom) Jenson Button	Honda	64	+1 Lap	14	
13	20	(Germany) Adrian Sutil	Spyker-Ferrari	63	+2 Laps	20	
14	21	(Netherlands) Christijan Albers	Spyker-Ferrari	63	+2 Laps	21	
Ret	9	(Germany) Nick Heidfeld	BMW Sauber	46	Gearbox	7	
Ret	11	(Germany) Ralf Schumacher	Toyota	44	Mechanical	17	
Ret	18	(Italy) Vitantonio Liuzzi	Toro Rosso-Ferrari	19	Hydraulics	16	
Ret	19	(United States) Scott Speed	Toro Rosso-Ferrari	9	Tyre	22	
Ret	6	(Finland) Kimi Räikkönen	Ferrari	9	Electrical	3	
Ret	12	(Italy) Jarno Trulli	Toyota	8	Fuel Pressure	PL^{4}	
Ret	15	(Australia) Mark Webber	Red Bull-Renault	7	Hydraulics	19	
Ret	17	(Austria) Alexander Wurz	Williams-Toyota	1	Collision	18	

Notes

- ^4 – Jarno Trulli started the race from the pitlane.

== Championship standings after the race ==
Drivers' Championship standings

+/–	Pos.	Driver	Points
2	1	(United Kingdom) Lewis Hamilton	30
1	2	(Spain) Fernando Alonso	28
1	3	(Brazil) Felipe Massa	27
2	4	(Finland) Kimi Räikkönen	22
	5	(Germany) Nick Heidfeld	15

Constructors' Championship standings

+/–	Pos.	Constructor	Points
	1	(United Kingdom) McLaren-Mercedes	58
	2	(Italy) Ferrari	49
	3	(Germany) BMW Sauber	23
	4	(France) Renault	11
1	5	(United Kingdom) Williams-Toyota	5

- Note: Only the top five positions are included for both sets of standings.

== See also ==
- 2007 Catalunya GP2 Series round

Previous race: 2007 Bahrain Grand Prix	FIA Formula One World Championship; 2007 season	Next race: 2007 Monaco Grand Prix
Previous race: 2006 Spanish Grand Prix	Spanish Grand Prix	Next race: 2008 Spanish Grand Prix
