= Jarno Trulli =

Italian racing driver (born 1974)

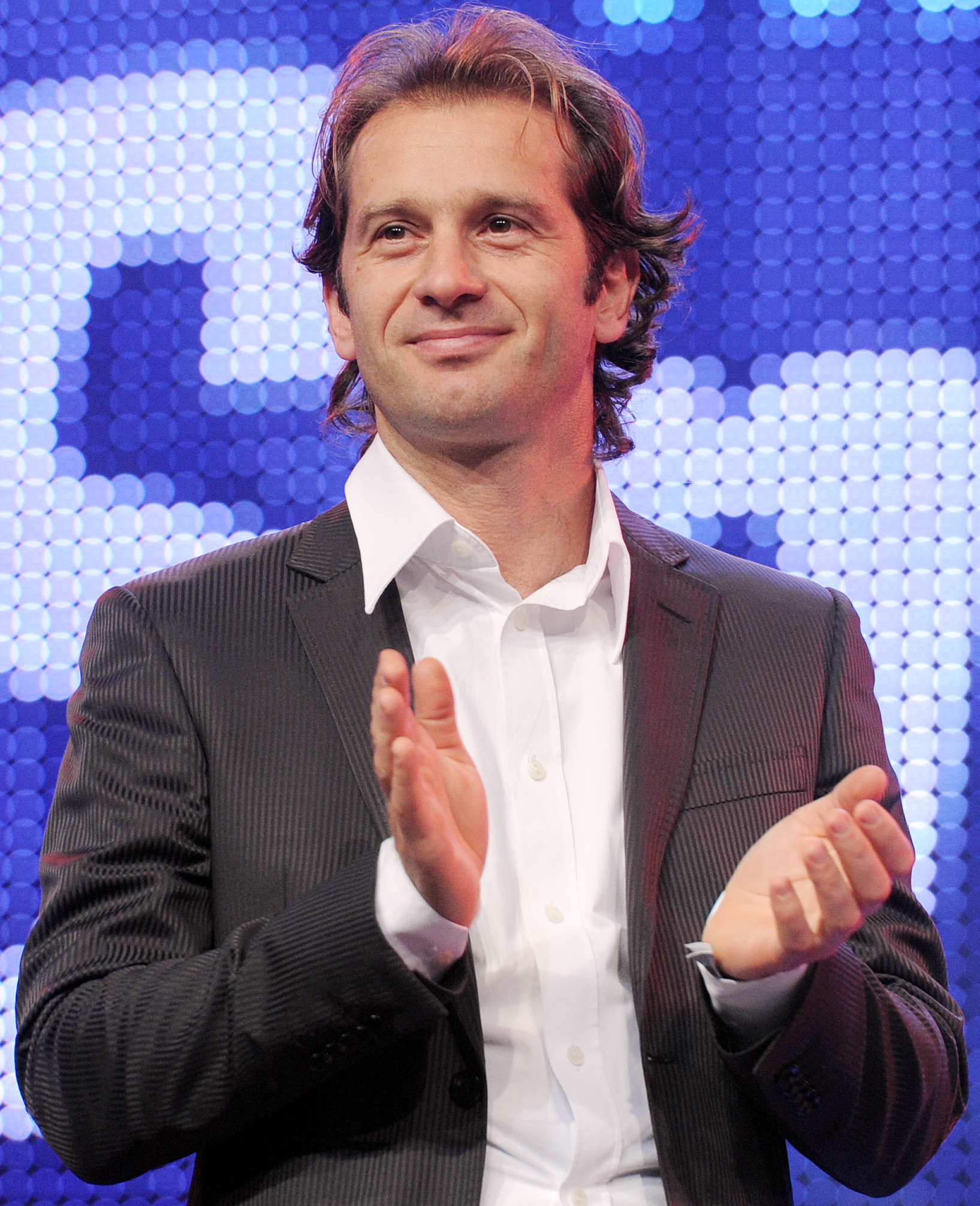
- Trulli in 2014
- Born: 13 July 1974 (age 52); Pescara, Abruzzo, Italy
- Spouse: Barbara (m. 2004)
- Children: 3, including Enzo

Formula One World Championship career
- Nationality: (Italy) Italian
- Active years: 1997–2011
- Team(s): Minardi, Prost, Jordan, Renault, Toyota, Team Lotus
- Entries: 256 (252 starts)
- Championships: 0
- Wins: 1
- Podiums: 11
- Career points: 246.5
- Pole positions: 4
- Fastest laps: 1
- First entry: 1997 Australian Grand Prix
- First win: 2004 Monaco Grand Prix
- Last entry: 2011 Brazilian Grand Prix

Formula E career
- Years active: 2014–2016
- Teams: Trulli
- Car number: 10
- Starts: 11
- Championships: 0
- Wins: 0
- Podiums: 0
- Poles: 1
- Fastest laps: 0
- Best finish: 20th in 2014–15

Awards
- 2000: Lorenzo Bandini Trophy

Jarno Trulli (Italian pronunciation: [ˈjarno ˈtrulli]; born 13 July 1974) is an Italian former racing driver and motorsport executive, who competed in Formula One from 1997 to 2011. Trulli won the 2004 Monaco Grand Prix with Renault.

He regularly competed in Formula One from 1997 to 2011, driving for Minardi, Prost, Jordan, Renault, Toyota and Lotus. His best result in the World Drivers' Championship was sixth place in 2004, also the year in which he scored his sole victory at the Monaco Grand Prix. Throughout his Formula One career, Trulli was renowned for his skill in qualifying, regularly achieving far better grid positions than rivals with superior cars to his own. He was also known for his defensive driving style which allowed him to successfully hold off quicker drivers, sometimes for an entire race. The combination of being able to achieve high grid positions in relatively slow cars, combined with his ability to hold off faster drivers, would often result in a line of vehicles forming behind him during a race, commonly referred to as the 'Trulli Train' by fans and media.

Trulli was set to remain in Formula One for 2012, but retired before the season began. He competed in the inaugural season of Formula E, founding and competing for Trulli GP. Trulli is the father of racing driver Enzo Trulli.

== Early life and career ==
Trulli's parents were motorsport fans and named their son after Jarno Saarinen, the Finnish Grand Prix motorcycle racing champion who was killed at Monza in 1973. He started racing in karts at an early age; after winning the Karting World Championship in 1991, the Italian karting championship and several other karting championships in different categories up to 1995, Trulli won the German Formula Three Championship in 1996.

== Formula One career ==
=== Minardi and Prost (1997–1999) ===
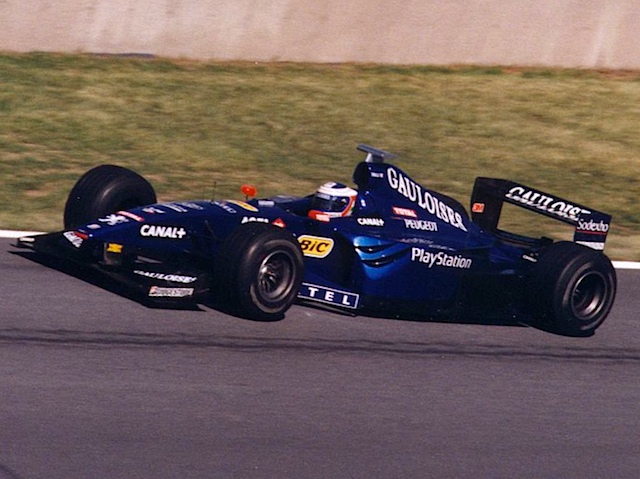
Trulli driving for Prost at the 1999 Canadian Grand Prix

In 1997, Trulli made his debut in Formula One with Minardi. After seven races, he replaced the injured Olivier Panis at Prost and impressed immediately, finishing fourth in Germany and even leading in Austria, looking set to finish second until his engine blew. He stayed at the Prost team for the next two seasons and eventually scored his first podium in wet conditions at the 1999 European Grand Prix. However, this was a rare highlight in a race few of the main front-runners finished, and the poor performance of the Prost team convinced him that a switch to Jordan would bring improved results.

=== Jordan (2000–2001) ===
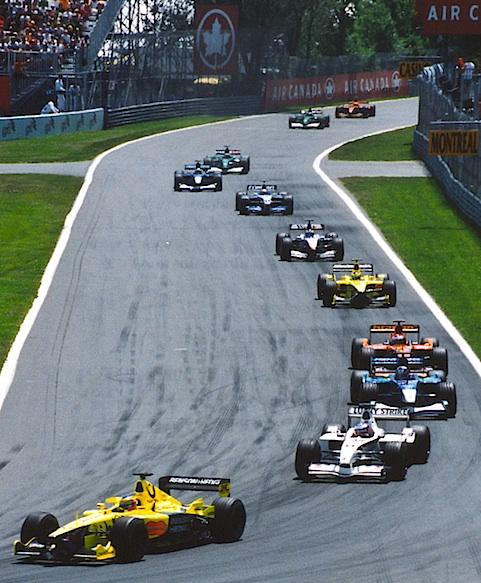
Trulli leads the midfield on the first lap of the 2001 Canadian Grand Prix.

In 2000, Trulli moved to the Irish squad, but the team was no longer the force it had been in the late 1990s. In his two years with Jordan, Trulli failed to score a podium, but did impress with a series of brilliant qualifying displays. During this period, suggestions were made that Trulli was more of a qualifying specialist than an out-and-out fast race driver, a charge he frequently denied. Under a long-term contract with his personal manager (and Renault manager) Flavio Briatore, Trulli secured a contract with the Anglo-French squad for 2002.

=== Renault (2002–2004) ===
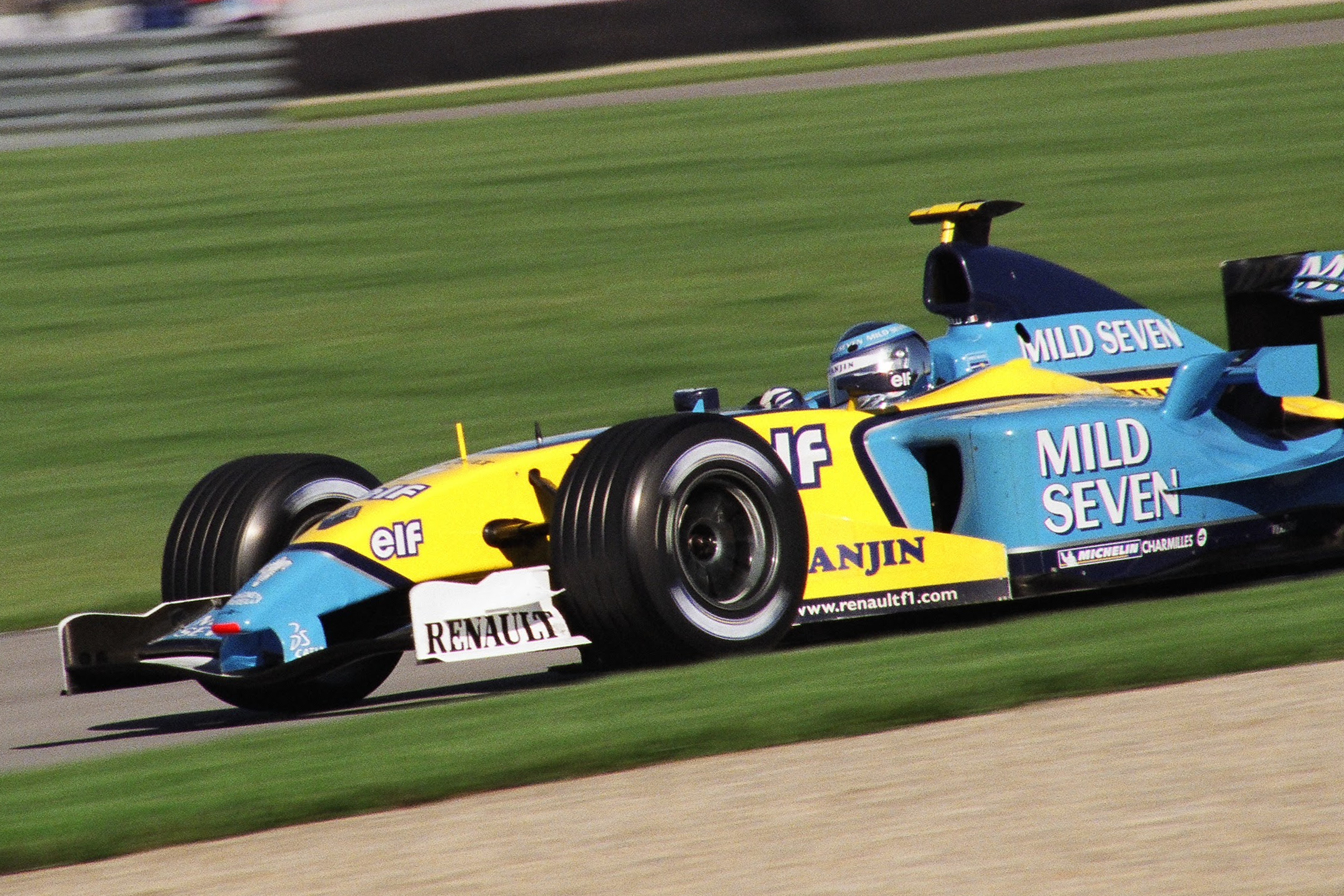
Jarno Trulli driving for Renault at the 2003 United States Grand Prix at Indianapolis.

Alongside Jenson Button, he often outqualified his British teammate, but was generally shaded in races. Regardless of Button's improved pace that season, it was Trulli who stayed at Renault for 2003 to partner promoted test-driver Fernando Alonso. The 2003 Renault was a strong car and in Alonso's hands won in Hungary. Trulli struggled to attain similar results, but did achieve a podium in Germany, his first since leaving Prost.

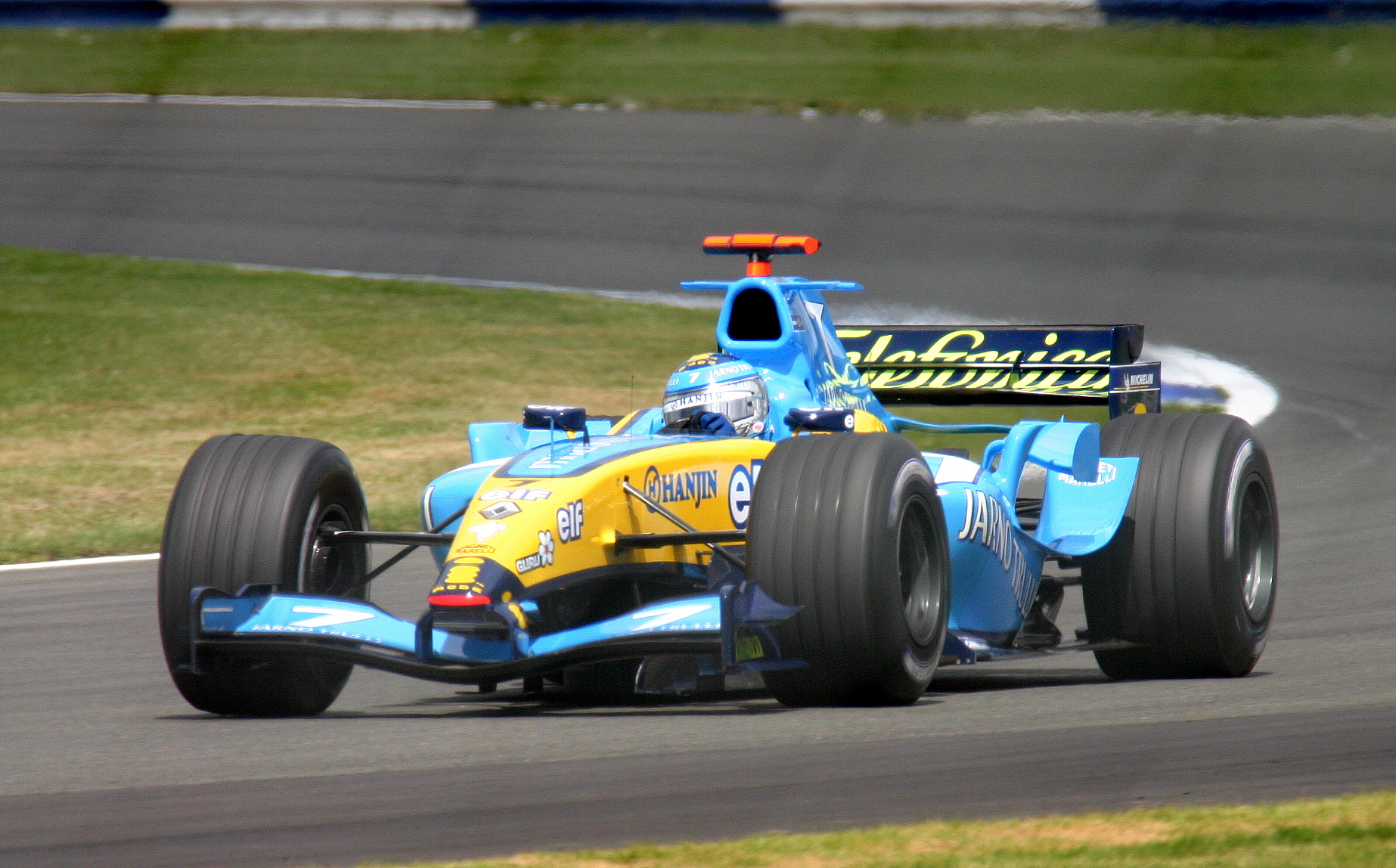
Trulli driving the Renault R24 during a practice session in 2004.

Mindful of how much Alonso had outperformed him in 2003, Trulli improved markedly the next year. For the first half of the season he was the better of the two Renault drivers, racking up regular points and podiums. At Monaco, he finally took his only victory after a brilliant display from pole position. Having performed so well, the Italian was eager to stick with the team for 2005, but his relationship with team-boss Briatore soured. A last corner error which allowed Ferrari's Rubens Barrichello onto the podium in France enraged the team, and from that point his days with the French manufacturer were numbered. He did not score any points after the French Grand Prix and was consistently off the pace during races. He later accused the team of favouring Alonso, but the reasons why his 2004 season deteriorated have never been properly identified. He was sacked three races before the end of the season and replaced by 1997 World Champion Jacques Villeneuve, despite leading his teammate in the championship at that point. Trulli had already agreed to drive for Toyota in 2005, and his early exit from Renault allowed him to take up his new seat for the last two races of the 2004 season, replacing Ricardo Zonta.

=== Toyota (2004–2009) ===
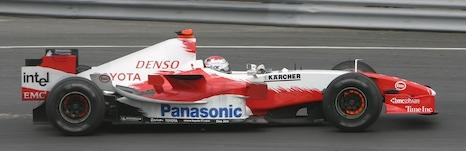
Trulli driving the Toyota TF105 in 2005

==== 2004–2005 ====
In 2005, early season podiums demonstrated Trulli's speed, and at Indianapolis, he took Toyota's first Formula One pole. However, he, his teammate and the majority of the grid, did not enter the race due to using Michelin tyres, which were not safe to race. For the vast majority of the year, he outpaced his highly paid teammate Ralf Schumacher, but a late season dip in form saw him slip to seventh in the championship, two points behind the German.

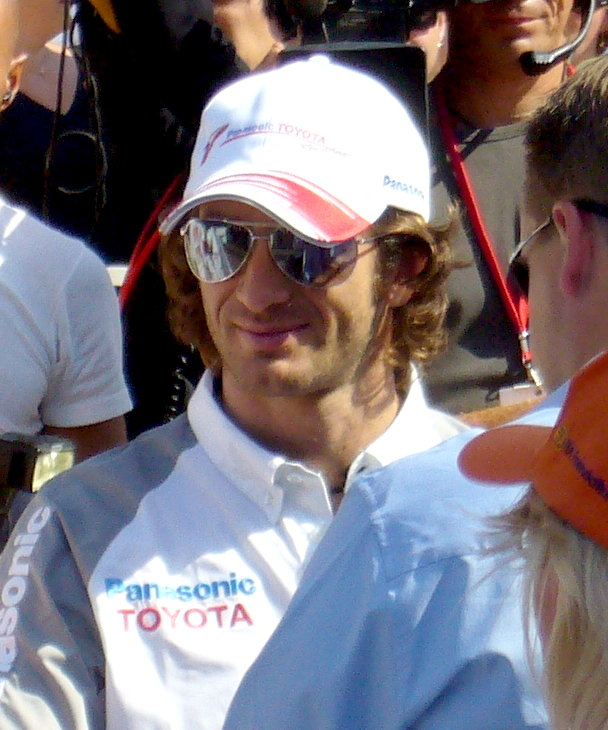
Jarno Trulli in Helsinki in 2006

==== 2006 ====
In 2006, Trulli suffered a very poor start to the season. On the first lap of the Australian Grand Prix, he was taken out by David Coulthard. He seemed to be outpaced by teammate Ralf Schumacher more often than not, but finally scored his first points of the season when he raced to sixth from fourth on the grid at the Canadian Grand Prix. Following this was a fourth place in the United States Grand Prix. From then on, he would only score three more times, with a couple of seventh-place finishes in the German Grand Prix and the Italian Grand Prix and also a sixth place in the Japanese Grand Prix, where his car became troublesome to drive mid-race, and Ralf Schumacher was delayed in the process. Trulli was racing very well in the season finale at Interlagos, but his car suffered suspension failure in the first ten laps, a fate which befell his teammate at the same time. He finished 12th overall.

==== 2007 ====
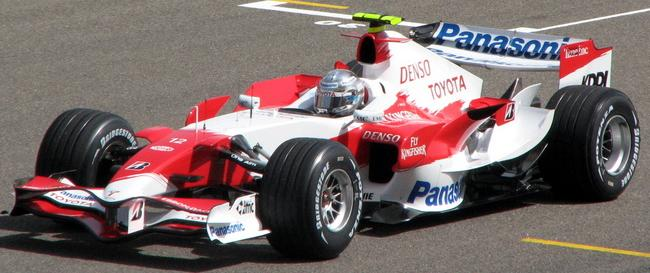
Trulli driving for Toyota at the 2007 Bahrain Grand Prix

Trulli scored his first points of 2007 in Malaysia, finishing in seventh place after qualifying eighth. A couple more points followed in Bahrain, but he stalled on the grid at the start of the Spanish Grand Prix and dropped out during the early laps due to mechanical failure. Monaco brought no better fortune for Trulli, as he finished down in 15th place, just ahead of teammate Schumacher, after qualifying his season-worst 14th. Points were collected by Trulli at the Indianapolis for sixth place. After a series of non-scoring runs, Trulli said that the result was 'incredible'. He also qualified well for the French Grand Prix but crashed with the Renault of Heikki Kovalainen on the opening lap, and duly retired because of the damage. Trulli accepted the blame for the incident. The second half of the season was disappointing with Trulli's only point coming in the final race of the season at Brazil.

Trulli finished the championship in 13th position, collecting only eight points. Post season, there had been reports that Trulli's contract was not safe, and that he may have been replaced in the Toyota team for 2008 by Heikki Kovalainen. These proved unfounded as Kovalainen signed for McLaren.

==== 2008 ====
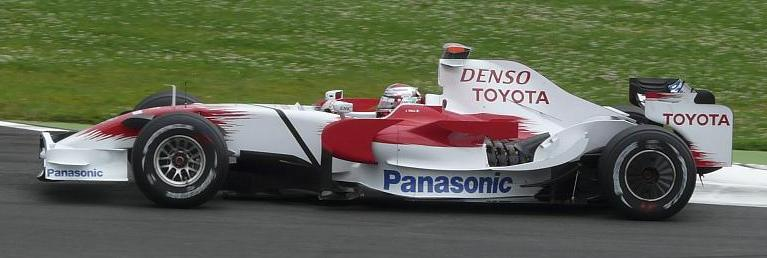
Trulli driving for Toyota at the 2008 French Grand Prix, where he scored the team's first podium finish for more than two years

In 2008, Trulli was hoping Toyota would make a big step forward. Timo Glock was confirmed as his teammate for the season. Trulli started the season quite well, with several points scoring finishes, the height of which was a fourth-place finish in Malaysia. Trulli's qualifying performances were also very good throughout the first few rounds of the Championship. His form then slumped a little, with disappointing performances in Turkey and Monaco, as he finished in non-points scoring positions.

However, Trulli bounced back from this with a sixth-place finish in Montreal. He then topped that in France by finishing on the podium in third place, holding off the challenge of Heikki Kovalainen and Robert Kubica in the closing laps.

Trulli qualified on the front row alongside pole-sitter Felipe Massa for the season-ending Brazilian Grand Prix, which was to decide the 2008 world championship between Massa and Lewis Hamilton. During the race, Trulli had several close shaves in the changeable weather conditions, and eventually finished eighth. His teammate Glock played a pivotal part in the title outcome as he was passed by Hamilton on the last corner of the race, which gave the Englishman the championship by one point from Massa, who won easily. Trulli finished eighth in the Drivers' Championship standings, collecting 31 points, four more than his teammate.

==== 2009 ====
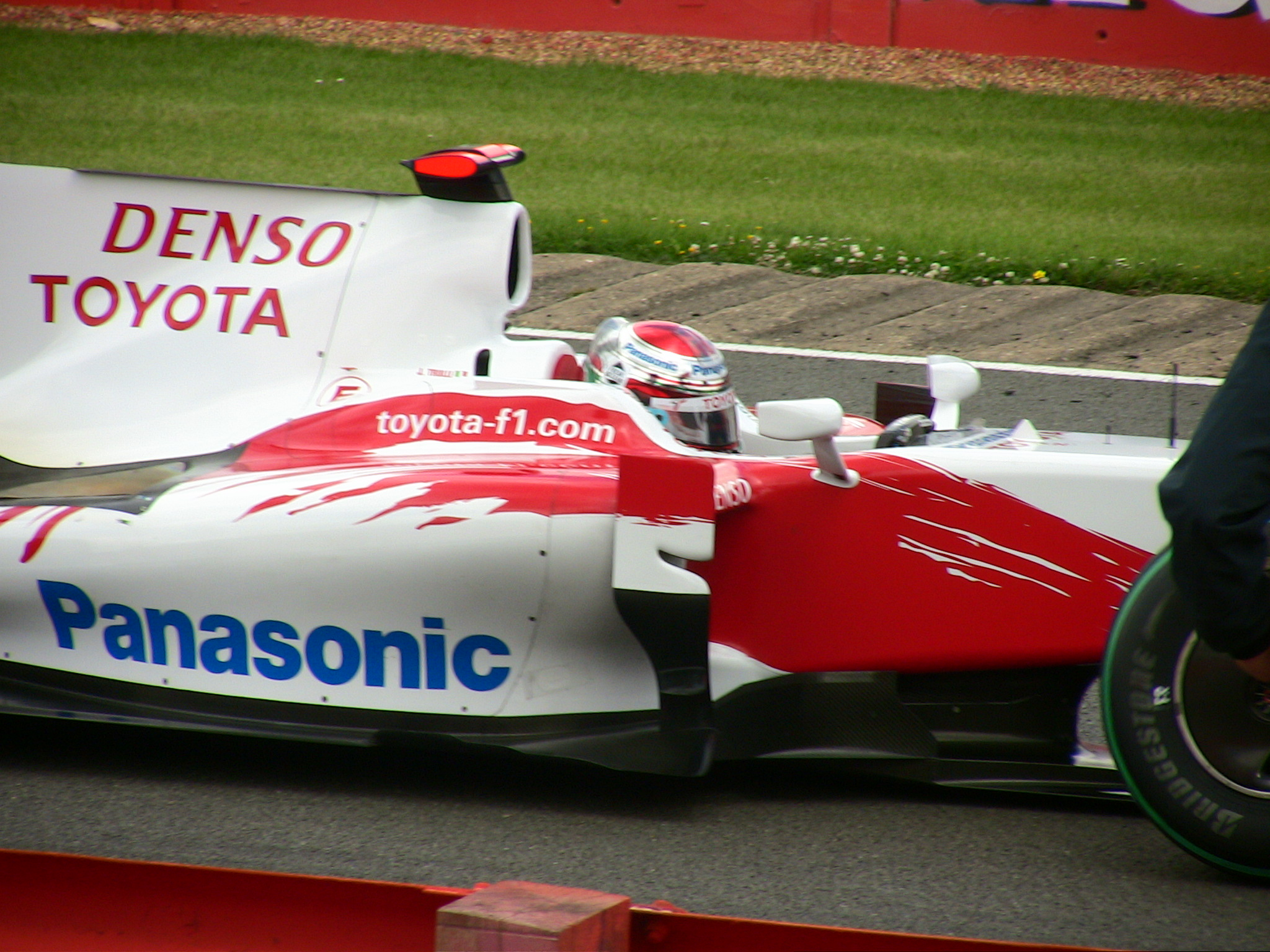
Trulli on the grid at the 2009 British Grand Prix

Trulli was confident going into 2009. In the first race of the 2009 season, the Toyotas of Trulli and Glock started the race from the pitlane as their qualifying times were disallowed due to Toyota's flexible rear wing breaching regulations. Although Trulli started from the pit lane, he finished in an impressive third place before being penalised 25 seconds, dropping him to 12th position for passing Lewis Hamilton under the safety car. A few days after this decision, Hamilton was disqualified from the race results for 'misleading' the race stewards by insisting that Jarno Trulli had passed him under the Safety Car although Hamilton in fact let him pass on purpose due to an order given by the team from the pitlane. Jarno Trulli therefore regained his third-place finish. At the Bahrain Grand Prix, Trulli qualified on pole position but due to an unconventional tyre strategy, he finished third. However he did record the fastest lap, the only time he has achieved this in his career. He holds the record of having started the most Grands Prix before recording a fastest lap.

Trulli crashed out of the Spanish Grand Prix after being forced off the track at the second corner and being collected by Adrian Sutil, and then had a poor performance in Monaco as the Toyotas qualified on the back row of the grid. Improvements saw him score points in three of the next four races, before the following four rounds saw him struggle again as he failed to finish in the top-ten. At the Singapore Grand Prix he placed 12th while teammate Glock was second. Trulli then fought back at the Japanese Grand Prix – which would prove to be Toyota's last home race – by qualifying and finishing second.

Trulli then qualified fourth in torrential conditions in Brazil, but like in Spain collided with Adrian Sutil on the opening lap of the race, an incident which enraged Trulli as he blamed Sutil for the crash. His obvious display of anger towards Sutil (who also retired) afterwards earned him a $10,000 fine. Trulli finished seventh at the season finale in Abu Dhabi scoring his final points in Toyota F1's last race.

=== Lotus (2010–2011) ===
==== 2010 ====
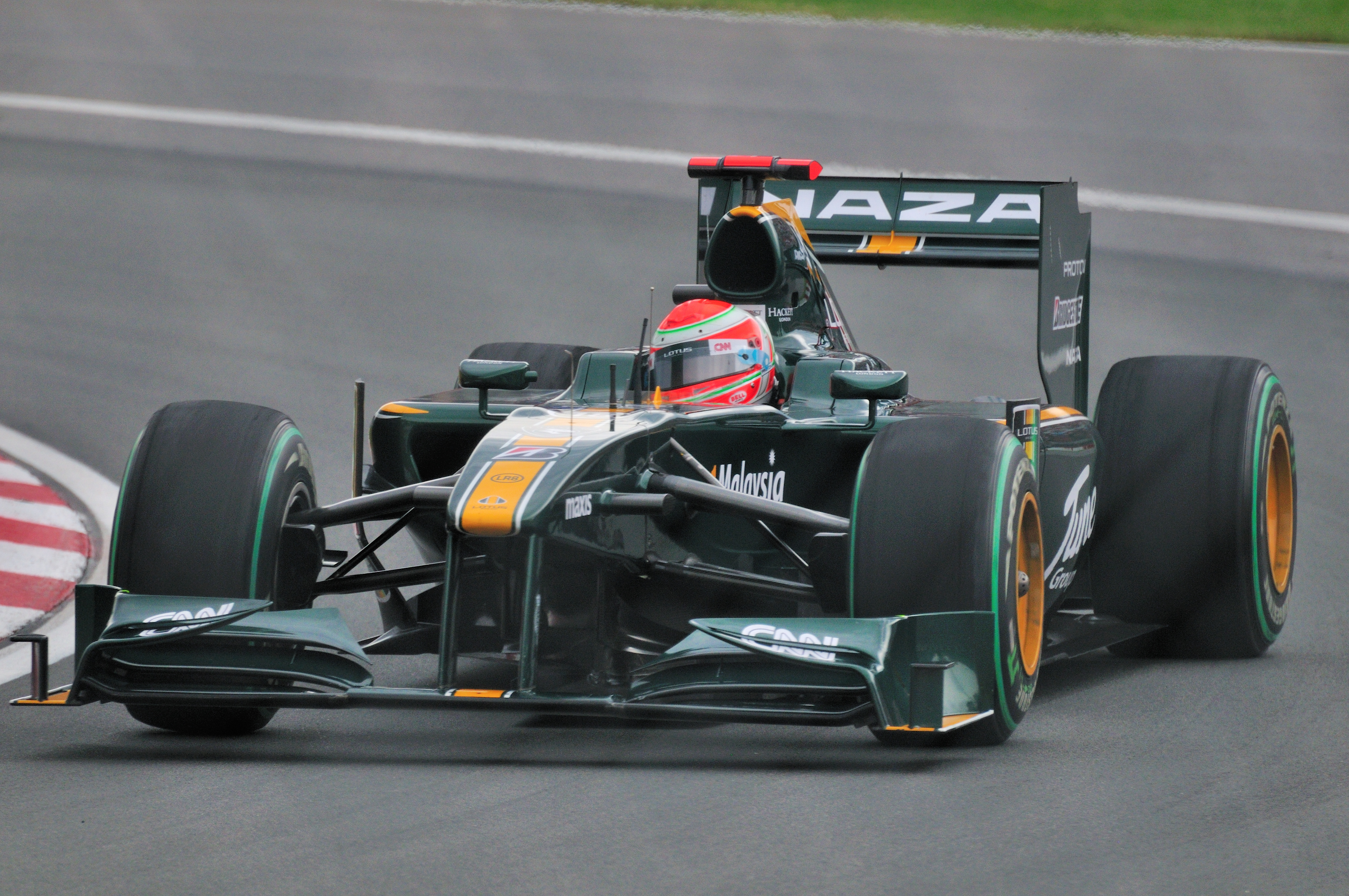
Trulli driving for Lotus Racing at the 2010 Canadian Grand Prix

On 14 December 2009, Trulli was confirmed as one of the newly formed Lotus team's drivers, joining former McLaren driver Heikki Kovalainen. He only finished one of the opening four races, a weaker reliability record than Kovalainen, leading him to note that "everything happens on my car and my car only – so to this day, my expectations have not been met".

At the launch of the Lotus T127, Trulli admitted in an interview with Autosport that US F1 and Sauber had been in contact with him. In late 2009, Trulli was asked to test a NASCAR stock car in North America for Toyota. The car was set up by Michael Waltrip Racing.

==== 2011 ====
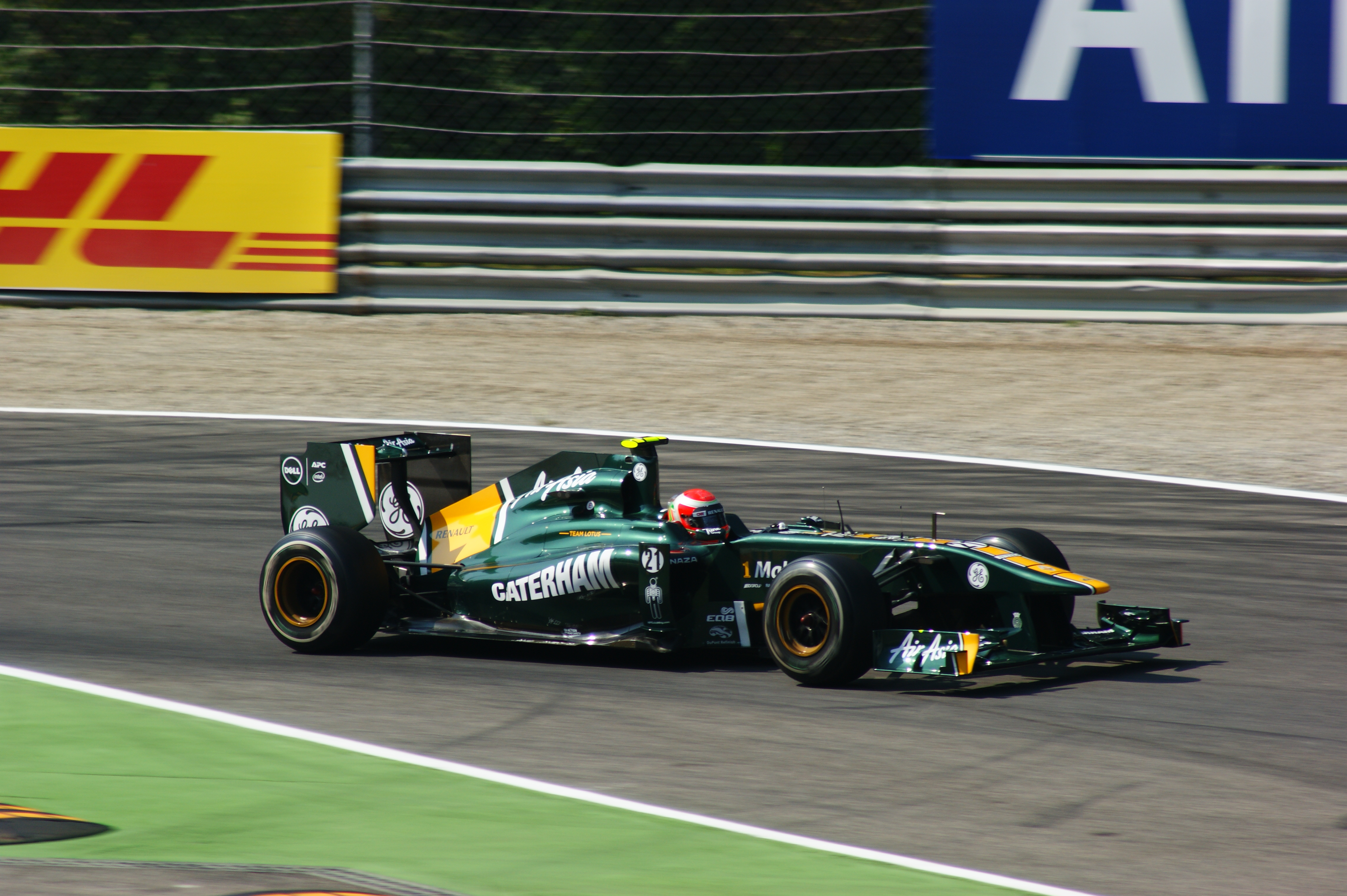
Trulli in the 2011 Italian Grand Prix

Trulli continued to drive for Lotus in 2011, with Lotus Racing being renamed Team Lotus. He again partnered Heikki Kovalainen.

Trulli's season started with thirteenth in Australia, before a retirement with a clutch problem in Malaysia. Trulli finished each of the next six races, equalling his best season finish of thirteenth in Monaco. In Britain, he retired with an oil leak. For the German Grand Prix, Trulli was replaced by reserve driver Karun Chandhok. When he returned in Hungary, he retired due to a water leak; his teammate Kovalainen retired some laps later with an identical problem. He finished 14th at both the Belgian Grand Prix and the Italian Grand Prix, where it was announced that Trulli would be retained for the 2012 season. After retiring in Singapore with a gearbox failure, Trulli finished 19th in Japan, 17th in Korea and 19th again, in India.

=== Caterham (2012) ===
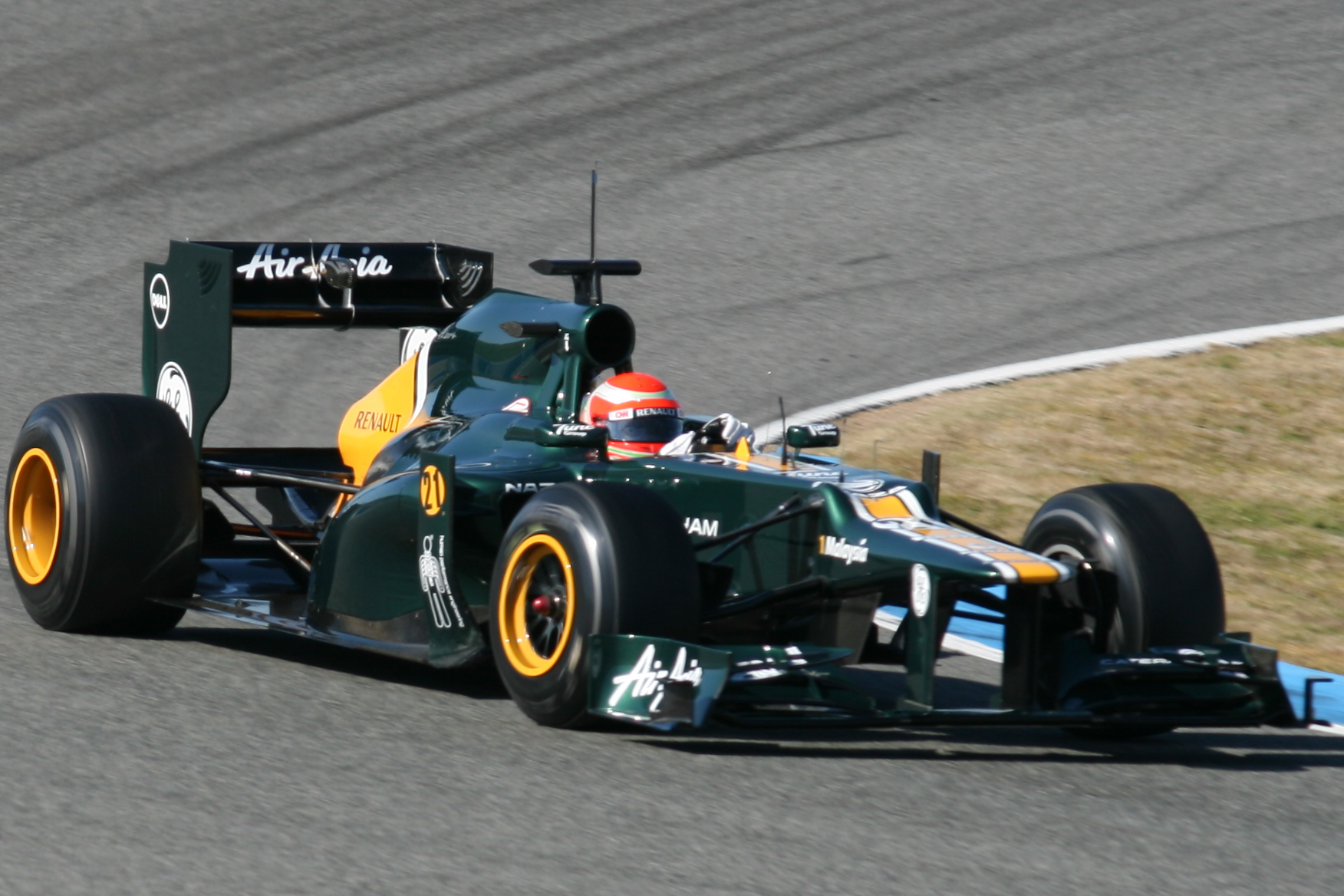
Trulli in pre-season testing for Caterham at Jerez – he was replaced by Vitaly Petrov after this test

Team Lotus was renamed to Caterham F1 ahead of the 2012 season. Trulli drove in one pre-season test, but on 17 February 2012 it was announced that Trulli was replaced by Vitaly Petrov. Following, Trulli stated that he was "really proud" to have helped Caterham become a Formula One team.

This left Formula One without an Italian driver for the first time since 1969, until Antonio Giovinazzi competed in the 2017 Australian Grand Prix.

== Other ventures ==
=== Trulli GP (2014–2015) ===
In the 2014–15 season, Trulli drove in the inaugural FIA Formula E Championship for his own team Trulli GP in partnership with Drayson Racing Technologies and Super Nova Racing, as announced on 18 June 2014. After failing to pass scrutineering of their new drivetrain for the first two races of the 2015–16 season, the team withdrew from the championship.

== Helmet ==
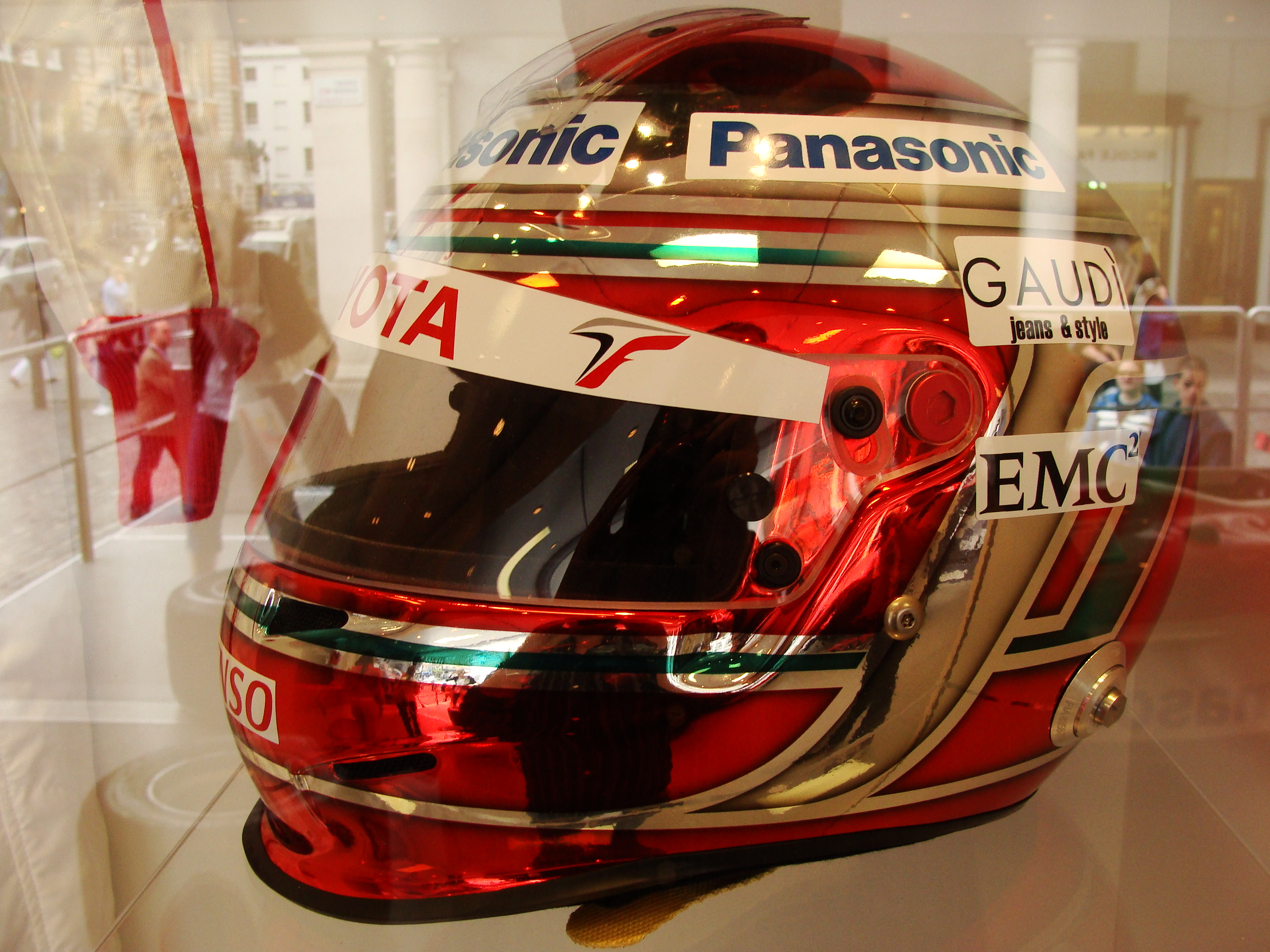
Trulli's helmet from the 2009 season

Trulli's original helmet design was white with a blue shape around the visor with a blue circle in the top and a green J with a red T in the sides. A ring around the blue circle was incorporated when he raced at Jordan and Renault, being coloured after the team's main sponsor. In 2004, his helmet changed from white to chromed silver and the shape, the J and the T became chromed with black outline. Later, in his first Toyota years the top became red and was added a white ring around the red circle. Finally in 2008, the helmet turned red with the J and the T of the original colours (and white outline) plus a white line on the chin area. From his Lotus years, the helmet design remained intact, with the change of the shades of colour from chromed to normal shades (the chromed silver becomes white).

== Personal life ==
Trulli is married to Barbara and they have two sons, Enzo Trulli (b. 2005), named after Trulli's father, and Marco (b. 2006), and a daughter Veronica (b. 2014). He is the co-owner of a vineyard in the Abruzzo region in Italy and produces his own wine. He also has his own range of Karts named 'Trulli Kart'; Trulli himself was a World Champion at Karting level. His son Enzo is also pursuing career in motorsports he competed in the WSK karting series, before starting single seater racing in F4 UAE in 2021, and for 2022 at present in FIA Formula 3 Championship.

== Racing record ==
=== Career summary ===
Season	Series	Team	Races	Wins	Poles	F/Laps	Podiums	Points	Position
1993	Italian Formula 3 Championship	MC Motorsport	6	0	0	0	0	0	NC
1994	British Formula 3 Championship	RC Motorsport	1	0	0	0	0	0	NC
1995	German Formula 3 Championship	KMS	12	2	1	1	3	95	4th
1995	Macau Grand Prix	KMS	1	0	0	0	1	N/A	**2nd**
1996	German Formula 3 Championship	Opel Team KMS Benetton Formula	15	6	7	1	10	206	**1st**
1996	Macau Grand Prix	Opel Team KMS Benetton Formula	1	0	0	0	1	N/A	**3rd**
1996	Grand Prix de Monaco F3	Opel Team KMS Benetton Formula	1	0	1	0	0	N/A	18th
1996	Masters of Formula 3	Opel Team KMS Benetton Formula	1	0	0	0	0	N/A	18th
1997	Formula One	Minardi Team	7	0	0	0	0	0	15th
1997	Formula One	Prost Gauloises Blondes	7	0	0	0	0	3	15th
1998	Formula One	Gauloises Prost Peugeot	16	0	0	0	0	1	15th
1999	Formula One	Gauloises Prost Peugeot	16	0	0	0	1	7	11th
2000	Formula One	Benson & Hedges Jordan	17	0	0	0	0	6	10th
2001	Formula One	Benson & Hedges Jordan Honda	17	0	0	0	0	12	9th
2002	Formula One	Mild Seven Renault F1 Team	17	0	0	0	0	9	8th
2003	Formula One	Mild Seven Renault F1 Team	16	0	0	0	1	33	8th
2004	Formula One	Mild Seven Renault F1 Team	15	1	2	0	2	46	6th
2004	Formula One	Panasonic Toyota Racing	2	0	0	0	0	0	6th
2005	Formula One	Panasonic Toyota Racing	19	0	1	0	3	43	7th
2006	Formula One	Panasonic Toyota Racing	18	0	0	0	0	15	12th
2007	Formula One	Panasonic Toyota Racing	17	0	0	0	0	8	13th
2008	Formula One	Panasonic Toyota Racing	18	0	0	0	1	31	9th
2009	Formula One	Panasonic Toyota Racing	17	0	1	1	3	32.5	8th
2010	Formula One	Lotus Racing	19	0	0	0	0	0	21st
2011	Formula One	Team Lotus	18	0	0	0	0	0	21st
2012	Formula One	Caterham F1 Team	Pre Season Test driver						
2014–15	Formula E	Trulli GP	11	0	1	0	0	15	20th
2015–16	Formula E	Trulli GP	1	0	0	0	0	0	NC

=== Complete German Formula Three results ===
(key) (Races in bold indicate pole position) (Races in italics indicate fastest lap)

Year	Entrant	Engine	Class	1	2	3	4	5	6	7	8	9	10	11	12	13	14	15	16	DC	Pts	Ref
1995	KMS	Opel	A	HOC; 1	HOC; 2	AVU; 1	AVU; 2	NOR; 1; 8	NOR; 2 DSQ	DIE; 1 DSQ	DIE; 2; 6	NÜR; 1; 4	NÜR; 2; 2	ALE; 1; 8	ALE; 2; 4	MAG; 1; 5	MAG; 2; 17	HOC; 1; 1	**HOC**; **2**; 1	4th	95	
1996	Opel Team KMS	Opel	A	**HOC**; **1**; 1	**HOC**; **2**; 1	**NÜR**; 4	NÜR; 1; 6	NÜR; 2; 5	NOR; 1; 3	NOR; 2; 1	**DIE**; **1**; 3	DIE; 2; 1	NÜR; 1; 2	NÜR; 2; 2	**MAG**; **1**; 11	MAG; 2; 5	**HOC**; **1**; 1	**HOC**; **2**; 1		1st	206	

=== Complete Formula One results ===
(key) (Races in bold indicate pole position; races in italics indicate fastest lap)

Year	Entrant	Chassis	Engine	1	2	3	4	5	6	7	8	9	10	11	12	13	14	15	16	17	18	19	WDC	Points
1997	Minardi Team	Minardi Team M197	Hart 830 AV7 3.0 V8	AUS; 9	BRA; 12	ARG; 9	SMR; DNS	MON; Ret	ESP; 15	CAN; Ret													15th	3
1997	Prost Gauloises Blondes	Prost JS45	Mugen-Honda MF-301 HB 3.0 V10								FRA; 10	GBR; 8	GER; 4	HUN; 7	BEL; 15	ITA; 10	AUT; Ret	LUX	JPN	EUR			15th	3
1998	Gauloises Prost Peugeot	Prost AP01	Peugeot A16 3.0 V10	AUS; Ret	BRA; Ret	ARG; 11	SMR; Ret	ESP; 9	MON; Ret	CAN; Ret	FRA; Ret	GBR; Ret	AUT; 10	GER; 12	HUN; Ret	BEL; 6	ITA; 13	LUX; Ret	JPN; 12^{†}				16th	1
1999	Gauloises Prost Peugeot	Prost AP02	Peugeot A18 3.0 V10	AUS; Ret	BRA; Ret	SMR; Ret	MON; 7	ESP; 6	CAN; Ret	FRA; 7	GBR; 9	AUT; 7	GER; Ret	HUN; 8	BEL; 12	ITA; Ret	EUR; 2	MAL; DNS	JPN; Ret				11th	7
2000	Benson & Hedges Jordan	Jordan EJ10	Mugen-Honda MF-301 HE 3.0 V10	AUS; Ret	BRA; 4	SMR; 15^{†}	GBR; 6	ESP; 12	EUR; Ret	MON; Ret	CAN; 6	FRA; 6	AUT; Ret										10th	6
2000	Benson & Hedges Jordan	Jordan EJ10B	Mugen-Honda MF-301 HE 3.0 V10											GER; 9	HUN; 7	BEL; Ret	ITA; Ret	USA; Ret	JPN; 13	MAL; 12			10th	6
2001	Benson & Hedges Jordan Honda	Jordan EJ11	Honda RA001E 3.0 V10	AUS; Ret	MAL; 8	BRA; 5	SMR; 5	ESP; 4	AUT; DSQ	MON; Ret	CAN; 11^{†}	EUR; Ret	FRA; 5	GBR; Ret	GER; Ret	HUN; Ret	BEL; Ret	ITA; Ret	USA; 4	JPN; 8			9th	12
2002	Mild Seven Renault F1 Team	Renault R202	Renault RS22 3.0 V10	AUS; Ret	MAL; Ret	BRA; Ret	SMR; 9	ESP; 10^{†}	AUT; Ret	MON; 4	CAN; 6	EUR; 8	GBR; Ret	FRA; Ret	GER; Ret	HUN; 8	BEL; Ret	ITA; 4	USA; 5	JPN; Ret			8th	9
2003	Mild Seven Renault F1 Team	Renault R23	Renault RS23 3.0 V10	AUS; 5	MAL; 5	BRA; 8	SMR; 13	ESP; Ret	AUT; 8	MON; 6	CAN; Ret	EUR; Ret	FRA; Ret										8th	33
2003	Mild Seven Renault F1 Team	Renault R23B	Renault RS23 3.0 V10											GBR; 6	GER; 3	HUN; 7	ITA; Ret	USA; 4	JPN; 5				8th	33
2004	Mild Seven Renault F1 Team	Renault R24	Renault RS24 3.0 V10	AUS; 7	MAL; 5	BHR; 4	SMR; 5	ESP; 3	**MON**; 1	EUR; 4	CAN; Ret	USA; 4	FRA; 4	GBR; Ret	GER; 11	HUN; Ret	**BEL**; 9	ITA; 10	CHN				6th	46
2004	Panasonic Toyota Racing	Toyota TF104B	Toyota RVX-04 3.0 V10																	JPN; 11	BRA; 12		6th	46
2005	Panasonic Toyota Racing	Toyota TF105	Toyota RVX-05 3.0 V10	AUS; 9	MAL; 2	BHR; 2	SMR; 5	ESP; 3	MON; 10	EUR; 8	CAN; Ret	**USA**; DNS	FRA; 5	GBR; 9	GER; 14^{†}	HUN; 4	TUR; 6	ITA; 5	BEL; Ret	BRA; 13^{†}			7th	43
2005	Panasonic Toyota Racing	Toyota TF105B	Toyota RVX-05 3.0 V10																		JPN; Ret	CHN; 15	7th	43
2006	Panasonic Toyota Racing	Toyota TF106	Toyota RVX-06 2.4 V8	BHR; 16	MAL; 9	AUS; Ret	SMR; Ret	EUR; 9	ESP; 10														12th	15
2006	Panasonic Toyota Racing	Toyota TF106B	Toyota RVX-06 2.4 V8							MON; 17^{†}	GBR; 11	CAN; 6	USA; 4	FRA; Ret	GER; 7	HUN; 12^{†}	TUR; 9	ITA; 7	CHN; Ret	JPN; 6	BRA; Ret		12th	15
2007	Panasonic Toyota Racing	Toyota TF107	Toyota RVX-07 2.4 V8	AUS; 9	MAL; 7	BHR; 7	ESP; Ret	MON; 15	CAN; Ret	USA; 6	FRA; Ret	GBR; Ret	EUR; 13	HUN; 10	TUR; 16	ITA; 11	BEL; 11	JPN; 13	CHN; 13	BRA; 8			13th	8
2008	Panasonic Toyota Racing	Toyota TF108	Toyota RVX-08 2.4 V8	AUS; Ret	MAL; 4	BHR; 6	ESP; 8	TUR; 10	MON; 13	CAN; 6	FRA; 3	GBR; 7	GER; 9	HUN; 7	EUR; 5	BEL; 16	ITA; 13	SIN; Ret	JPN; 5	CHN; Ret	BRA; 8		9th	31
2009	Panasonic Toyota Racing	Toyota TF109	Toyota RVX-09 2.4 V8	AUS; 3	MAL; 4^{‡}	CHN; Ret	**BHR**; 3	ESP; Ret	MON; 13	TUR; 4	GBR; 7	GER; 17	HUN; 8	EUR; 13	BEL; Ret	ITA; 14	SIN; 12	JPN; 2	BRA; Ret	ABU; 7			8th	32.5
2010	Lotus Racing	Lotus T127	Cosworth CA2010 2.4 V8	BHR; 17^{†}	AUS; DNS	MAL; 17	CHN; Ret	ESP; 17	MON; 15^{†}	TUR; Ret	CAN; Ret	EUR; 21	GBR; 16	GER; Ret	HUN; 15	BEL; 19	ITA; Ret	SIN; Ret	JPN; 13	KOR; Ret	BRA; 19	ABU; 21^{†}	21st	0
2011	Team Lotus	Lotus T128	Renault RS27 2.4 V8	AUS; 13	MAL; Ret	CHN; 19	TUR; 18	ESP; 18	MON; 13	CAN; 16	EUR; 20	GBR; Ret	GER	HUN; Ret	BEL; 14	ITA; 14	SIN; Ret	JPN; 19	KOR; 17	IND; 19	ABU; 18	BRA; 18	21st	0

^{‡} Half points awarded as less than 75% of race distance was completed.
^{†} Trulli did not finish the Grand Prix, but was classified as he had completed over 90% of the race distance.

=== Complete Formula E results ===
(key) (Races in bold indicate pole position; races in italics indicate fastest lap)

Year	Team	Chassis	Powertrain	1	2	3	4	5	6	7	8	9	10	11	Pos	Points
2014–15	Trulli Formula E Team	Spark SRT01-e	SRT01-e	BEI; Ret	PUT; 16	PDE; 4	BUE; Ret	MIA; 15	LBH; Ret	MCO; 11	**BER**; 19†	MSC; 18†	LDN; 15	LDN; Ret	20th	15
2015–16	Trulli Formula E Team	Spark SRT01-e	Motomatica JT-01	BEI	PUT; DNP	PDE	BUE	MEX	LBH	PAR	BER	LDN	LDN		NC	0

^{†} Driver did not finish the race, but was classified as he completed more than 90% of the race distance.

=== Pre-Formula One career ===
- 1996: Champion in German Formula 3 (KMS Dallara-Opel)
- 1995: 4th in German Formula 3 (KMS Dallara-Opel), 1st in Italian Karting class 100 FA, 1st in World karting class 125FC, Senna Memorial World Cup winner
- 1994: Senna Memorial World Cup winner, 1st in North American class 100SA, 1st in European class 100SA
- 1993: 2nd in World karting Champion class 100 SA, 1st in Grand prix of Japan Class 100 FSA
- 1992: 2nd in World karting class 125 FC
- 1991: Champion in Karting World Championship 100 FK
- 1990: 1st in Grand Prix of Hong Kong Class 100 FA
- 1988–1990: Three times Champion in Italian National 100 Class
- 1983–1995: Karting

== See also ==
- Formula One drivers from Italy

Sporting positions
Preceded by Norberto Fontana	German Formula Three; Champion; 1996	Succeeded by Nick Heidfeld
Awards and achievements
Preceded by Alexander Wurz	Lorenzo Bandini Trophy; 2000	Succeeded by Jenson Button
