= 2007 Bahrain Grand Prix =

Coordinates: 26°01′57″N 50°30′38″E

Race 3 of 17 in the 2007 Formula One World Championship
← Previous race	Next race →
- The Bahrain Circuit in Sakhir

Race details
- Date: 15 April 2007
- Official name: 2007 Formula 1 Gulf Air Bahrain Grand Prix
- Location: Bahrain International Circuit; Sakhir, Bahrain
- Course: Permanent racing facility
- Course length: 5.412 km (3.363 miles)
- Distance: 57 laps, 308.238 km (191.530 miles)
- Weather: Sunny, dry, windy
- Attendance: 90,000 (Weekend)

Pole position
Driver	(Brazil) Felipe Massa	Ferrari
- Time: 1:32.652

Fastest lap
Driver	(Brazil) Felipe Massa	Ferrari
- Time: 1:34.067 on lap 42

Podium
First	(Brazil) Felipe Massa	Ferrari
Second	(United Kingdom) Lewis Hamilton	McLaren-Mercedes
Third	(Finland) Kimi Räikkönen	Ferrari

The 2007 Bahrain Grand Prix (formally the 2007 Formula 1 Gulf Air Bahrain Grand Prix) was a Formula One motor race was the third race of the 2007 FIA Formula One World Championship. It was held on 15 April at the Bahrain International Circuit in Sakhir, Bahrain.

In practice 1 and 2, Kimi Räikkönen topped the charts. Lewis Hamilton also placed well. Vitantonio Liuzzi got a surprise 8th-place result in 1st practice. Felipe Massa won the Grand Prix from Lewis Hamilton, who made history to become the first driver ever to finish on the podium in all his first three races.

== Report ==
=== Practice ===
The Friday morning practice session saw both Ferraris top the time sheets with Kimi Räikkönen the fastest with a time of 1:33.162 with his teammate, Felipe Massa, just over half a second slower than the Finn in second. The Italian team's nearest competition was the two McLarens of Lewis Hamilton and Fernando Alonso who were third and fourth respectively, Hamilton just under a second slower than Räikkönen's time.

Räikkönen was fastest again in the afternoon session, clocking a time of 1:33.527, just under four tenths slower than his fastest time during the morning session. Unlike the morning session, however, Ferrari did not have both their cars occupying the top two as Massa's fastest time was fourth fastest, with Hamilton and BMW Sauber's Robert Kubica separating the two Ferraris.

It was six thousandths of a second that prevented Räikkönen from being fastest in all three practice sessions, but his run was ended by Lewis Hamilton with the lead BMW Sauber of Nick Heidfeld in third; Kubica fourth; Anthony Davidson's Super Aguri in fifth and Massa completing the top six, four tenths down on Hamilton's time.

=== Qualifying ===
Qualifying was played out in temperatures of over 34 °C and despite a small shower of rain just after the morning practice session was over, the track itself was dry. Williams' Alexander Wurz was the first out onto the circuit with former Williams drivers David Coulthard and Jenson Button following him. Like the first practice session on Friday, the two Ferraris set the early pace, both recording laps under 1:33.000, the only two cars to do so during Part One of Qualifying. The first six to be eliminated from qualifying were Takuma Sato, who was seventeen thousandths of a second slower than sixteenth place Jenson Button; both Toro Rossos of Liuzzi and Speed; both Spykers of Albers and Sutil and David Coulthard joined Albers at the back of grid after his Red Bull suffered a gearbox problem.

The two Toyotas of Ralf Schumacher and Jarno Trulli left the pits first for Part Two of qualifying. Like in the first session, Ferrari were setting the pace, this time however it was Massa who was leading the way, with both their drivers setting times under 1:32:000, only to be split to Hamilton's McLaren. Button, who only just made the cut for the second round of qualifying, was slowest in the session, over two seconds slower than Massa's time. Joining the Brit was fellow Honda driver Rubens Barrichello; Ralf Schumacher; Davidson; Heikki Kovalainen and Wurz.

Hamilton and the two BMW Saubers were first out in the final Part of qualifying, with Massa setting the early pace. The final part of the session saw Massa improve his time, lapping with a time of 1:32.652. Hamilton came second, just under three tenths slower than Massa, putting him on the front row in his third Formula One race. Kimi Räikkönen and Fernando Alonso made up row two, both BMW Saubers of Heidfeld and Kubica were fifth and sixth respectively; Giancarlo Fisichella and Mark Webber made up row four and Jarno Trulli and Nico Rosberg completed the top ten ninth and tenth respectively.

=== Race ===
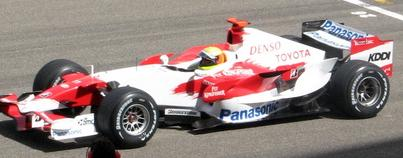
Ralf Schumacher en route to 12th place

At the start, the two leaders maintained their positions with Alonso passing Räikkönen into the second corner to take third. Further back, Adrian Sutil, Jenson Button and Scott Speed were involved in a collision in turn four, with Button and Speed out on the spot, while Sutil managed to get back to the pits. The Safety Car was brought out to clear up the wreckage.

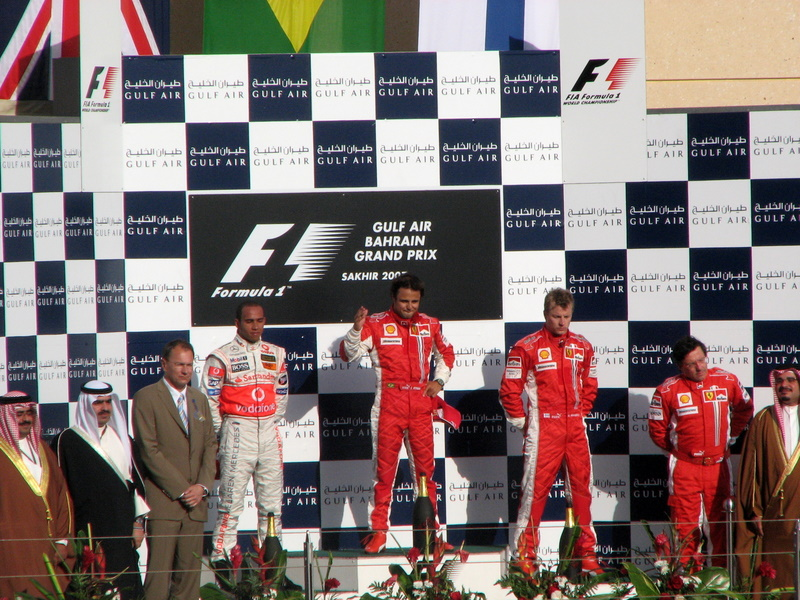
The podium ceremony (from left to right: Lewis Hamilton, Felipe Massa, Kimi Räikkönen and Luca Baldisserri.)

Vitantonio Liuzzi had a drive-through penalty on lap nine for overtaking under a safety car. On the same lap, Rosberg had an off-track excursion, losing a place to Coulthard in the process. The front two stayed in the same positions after the first round of stops, but Räikkönen got back past Alonso to take third.

Alonso began to lose ground, and was passed by Heidfeld. He stayed behind the BMW for the remainder of the race. The Renaults also began to struggle, with Coulthard managing to overtake Fisichella. However, both Red Bulls retired in quick succession, promoting Trulli and Fisichella to the points.

Massa won the Grand Prix, 2.3 seconds in front of rookie Hamilton.

After the race, Alonso, Räikkönen and Hamilton were equal on points. The last time the top three were level on points was in 1950 after the Indianapolis 500. By finishing second, Hamilton became the first driver in Formula One history to finish on the podium in each of his first three World Championship Grands Prix; the previous record was two consecutive podium finishes, achieved by Peter Arundell in the 1964 season.

== Classification ==
=== Qualifying ===
Pos.	No.	Driver	Constructor	Q1	Q2	Q3	Grid
1	5	(Brazil) Felipe Massa	Ferrari	1:32.443	1:31.359	1:32.652	1
2	2	(United Kingdom) Lewis Hamilton	McLaren-Mercedes	1:32.580	1:31.752	1:32.935	2
3	6	(Finland) Kimi Räikkönen	Ferrari	1:33.161	1:31.812	1:33.131	3
4	1	(Spain) Fernando Alonso	McLaren-Mercedes	1:33.049	1:32.214	1:33.192	4
5	9	(Germany) Nick Heidfeld	BMW Sauber	1:33.164	1:32.154	1:33.404	5
6	10	(Poland) Robert Kubica	BMW Sauber	1:33.348	1:32.292	1:33.710	6
7	3	(Italy) Giancarlo Fisichella	Renault	1:33.556	1:32.889	1:34.056	7
8	15	(Australia) Mark Webber	Red Bull-Renault	1:33.496	1:32.808	1:34.106	8
9	12	(Italy) Jarno Trulli	Toyota	1:33.218	1:32.429	1:34.154	9
10	16	(Germany) Nico Rosberg	Williams-Toyota	1:33.349	1:32.815	1:34.399	10
11	17	(Austria) Alexander Wurz	Williams-Toyota	1:33.759	1:32.915		11
12	4	(Finland) Heikki Kovalainen	Renault	1:33.467	1:32.935		12
13	23	(United Kingdom) Anthony Davidson	Super Aguri-Honda	1:33.299	1:33.082		13
14	11	(Germany) Ralf Schumacher	Toyota	1:33.923	1:33.294		14
15	8	(Brazil) Rubens Barrichello	Honda	1:33.776	1:33.624		15
16	7	(United Kingdom) Jenson Button	Honda	1:33.967	1:33.731		16
17	22	(Japan) Takuma Sato	Super Aguri-Honda	1:33.984			17
18	18	(Italy) Vitantonio Liuzzi	Toro Rosso-Ferrari	1:34.024			18
19	19	(United States) Scott Speed	Toro Rosso-Ferrari	1:34.333			19
20	20	(Germany) Adrian Sutil	Spyker-Ferrari	1:35.280			20
21	14	(United Kingdom) David Coulthard	Red Bull-Renault	1:35.341			21
22	21	(Netherlands) Christijan Albers	Spyker-Ferrari	1:35.533			22

=== Race ===
Pos.	No.	Driver	Constructor	Laps	Time/Retired	Grid	Points
1	5	(Brazil) Felipe Massa	Ferrari	57	1:33:27.515	1	10
2	2	(United Kingdom) Lewis Hamilton	McLaren-Mercedes	57	+2.360	2	8
3	6	(Finland) Kimi Räikkönen	Ferrari	57	+10.839	3	6
4	9	(Germany) Nick Heidfeld	BMW Sauber	57	+13.831	5	5
5	1	(Spain) Fernando Alonso	McLaren-Mercedes	57	+14.426	4	4
6	10	(Poland) Robert Kubica	BMW Sauber	57	+45.529	6	3
7	12	(Italy) Jarno Trulli	Toyota	57	+1:21.371	9	2
8	3	(Italy) Giancarlo Fisichella	Renault	57	+1:21.701	7	1
9	4	(Finland) Heikki Kovalainen	Renault	57	+1:29.411	12	
10	16	(Germany) Nico Rosberg	Williams-Toyota	57	+1:29.916	10	
11	17	(Austria) Alexander Wurz	Williams-Toyota	56	+1 Lap	11	
12	11	(Germany) Ralf Schumacher	Toyota	56	+1 Lap	14	
13	8	(Brazil) Rubens Barrichello	Honda	56	+1 Lap	15	
14	21	(Netherlands) Christijan Albers	Spyker-Ferrari	55	+2 Laps	22	
15	20	(Germany) Adrian Sutil	Spyker-Ferrari	53	+4 Laps	20	
16	23	(United Kingdom) Anthony Davidson	Super Aguri-Honda	51	Engine	13	
Ret	15	(Australia) Mark Webber	Red Bull-Renault	41	Gearbox	8	
Ret	14	(United Kingdom) David Coulthard	Red Bull-Renault	36	Driveshaft	21	
Ret	22	(Japan) Takuma Sato	Super Aguri-Honda	34	Engine	17	
Ret	18	(Italy) Vitantonio Liuzzi	Toro Rosso-Ferrari	26	Hydraulics	18	
Ret	7	(United Kingdom) Jenson Button	Honda	0	Collision	16	
Ret	19	(United States) Scott Speed	Toro Rosso-Ferrari	0	Collision	19	

== Championship standings after the race ==
Drivers' Championship standings

+/–	Pos.	Driver	Points
	1	(Spain) Fernando Alonso	22
	2	(Finland) Kimi Räikkönen	22
	3	(United Kingdom) Lewis Hamilton	22
2	4	(Brazil) Felipe Massa	17
1	5	(Germany) Nick Heidfeld	15

Constructors' Championship standings

+/–	Pos.	Constructor	Points
	1	(United Kingdom) McLaren-Mercedes	44
	2	(Italy) Ferrari	39
	3	(Germany) BMW Sauber	18
	4	(France) Renault	9
	5	(Japan) Toyota	5

- Note: Only the top five positions are included for both sets of standings.

== See also ==
- 2007 Bahrain GP2 Series round

Previous race: 2007 Malaysian Grand Prix	FIA Formula One World Championship; 2007 season	Next race: 2007 Spanish Grand Prix
Previous race: 2006 Bahrain Grand Prix	Bahrain Grand Prix	Next race: 2008 Bahrain Grand Prix
