= James Urwin =

British Formula One engineer

- Education: Loughborough University
- Occupation: Engineer
- Employer: Williams Racing
- Known for: Formula One engineer
- Title: Race engineer

James Urwin is a British Formula One and motorsports engineer. He is currently the Race Engineer for Alex Albon at the Williams Racing Formula One team. He has previously been the race engineer to Lance Stroll and George Russell.

== Career ==
Urwin studied Automotive Engineering at Loughborough University before beginning his motorsport career as a mechanic in British Touring Car and British Formula Renault championships. In 2004 he joined Taurus Sports, working in both British GT and the European Le Mans Series, contributing to championship-winning campaigns. He later moved to Super Nova Racing, progressing from mechanic to Data and Performance Engineer in GP2 and A1GP, and ultimately serving as Race Engineer in the Auto GP series.

In 2011 Urwin joined Caterham Racing as a GP2 Race Engineer before moving to Williams Racing in 2014 as a Performance Engineer. He was promoted to Formula One Race Engineer in 2017, working with Lance Stroll during his first two seasons in the sport, guiding the Canadian to a podium finish at the 2017 Azerbaijan Grand Prix. From 2019 to 2021 Urwin was partnered with rookie George Russell. He oversaw weekend execution and set-up direction, guiding the Briton through his first three Formula One seasons. In 2019 Russell out-qualified teammate Robert Kubica at every round, followed by regular Q2 appearances in 2020 and his maiden podium at the 2021 Belgian Grand Prix.

Since 2022 he has served as Senior Race Engineer to Alex Albon, leading race execution and performance optimisation as Williams has rebuilt its competitiveness in the midfield.
