= Chris Dyer (engineer) =

Australian motor racing engineer (born 1968)

- Born: Christopher Dyer; 12 February 1968 (age 58)

Christopher Dyer (born 12 February 1968) is an Australian vehicle engineer. He is the former head of vehicle performance group at Renault Sport Formula 1 Team and the former race engineer of Michael Schumacher and Kimi Räikkönen at Scuderia Ferrari.

== Early career ==
Born in Bendigo, Victoria, Dyer worked with the top V8 Supercar outfit, the Tom Walkinshaw owned Holden Racing Team in the mid-1990s alongside drivers like Peter Brock and Craig Lowndes. In 1997, he switched to Walkinshaw's Formula One team Arrows, working as Damon Hill's chief data engineer. In 1998, he stepped up to race engineering, working with drivers like Jos Verstappen.

== Ferrari ==
For the 2001 season, Dyer moved to Ferrari, working as Schumacher's vehicle engineer, alongside Luca Baldisserri. By the end of 2002, Dyer engineered Schumacher at the tests; after the championship had been won, he also race engineered Schumacher at the last three races at Monza, Indianapolis, and Suzuka. Dyer then race engineered Schumacher to his 2003 and 2004 world titles, appearing with the German on the podium after his triumph at the 2003 Canadian Grand Prix. Dyer was quoted saying: "One of Michael's strengths is that, apart from driving quickly, he has an understanding of the car and how all the systems work."

Dyer took over as Räikkönen's race engineer when the Finn moved to Ferrari in 2007. Despite suggestions that the pair did not always get the most from the package, Räikkönen took the title in 2007 at the final race by a single point over Lewis Hamilton and Fernando Alonso. After the disappointing results in the 2008 season, Ferrari announced that Dyer would be replaced by Andrea Stella for the 2009 season, with Dyer promoted to chief track engineer.

On 4 January 2011, Ferrari announced that Dyer was replaced as head of race track engineering by former McLaren engineer Pat Fry. This decision was taken after Dyer made the call to bring Alonso in the pit lane to cover off the Australian Mark Webber's pit stop in the final race of the season, the 2010 Abu Dhabi Grand Prix. The decision was blamed for costing Alonso the title in favour of Sebastian Vettel who went on to become champion. In October 2012, it was announced that Dyer was to join BMW's Deutsche Tourenwagen Masters (DTM) programme as chief engineer.

== Renault ==
On 4 February 2016, it was announced by Renault Sport that Dyer would be returning to Formula One as their head of vehicle performance group.

== McLaren ==
Dyer joined NEOM McLaren Formula E Team as their technical director in end-2022. Following the shutting down of the team Dyer was reassigned to become the technical director of McLaren's endurance racing exploits.

== Career ==
- 1997: Arrows data engineer
- 1998–2000: Arrows race engineer
- 2001–2002: Scuderia Ferrari vehicle engineer
- 2003–2006: Scuderia Ferrari race engineer, Michael Schumacher
- 2007–2008: Scuderia Ferrari race engineer, Kimi Räikkönen
- 2009–2011: Scuderia Ferrari chief track engineer
- 2011–2012: Scuderia Ferrari team member
- 2012–2015: BMW DTM chief engineer
- 2016–2020: Renault Sport F1 Team, head of vehicle performance group
- 2022–2025: NEOM McLaren Formula E Team, Technical Director
- 2025–present: McLaren Endurance Racing, Technical Director
