= Kimi Räikkönen =

Finnish racing driver (born 1979)

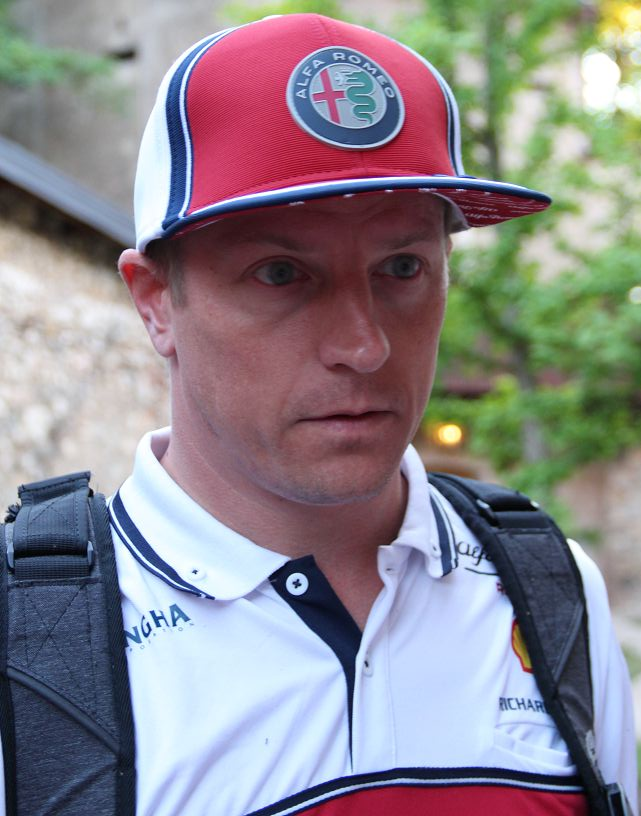
- Räikkönen at the 2019 Austrian Grand Prix
- Born: Kimi-Matias Räikkönen; 17 October 1979 (age 47); Espoo, Uusimaa, Finland
- Spouses: Jenni Dahlman (m. 2004; div. 2014) Minna-Mari Virtanen (m. 2016)
- Children: 3

Formula One World Championship career
- Nationality: (Finland) Finnish
- Active years: 2001–2009, 2012–2021
- Team(s): Sauber, McLaren, Ferrari, Lotus, Alfa Romeo
- Car number: 7
- Entries: 353 (349 starts)
- Championships: 1 (2007)
- Wins: 21
- Podiums: 103
- Career points: 1873
- Pole positions: 18
- Fastest laps: 46
- First entry: 2001 Australian Grand Prix
- First win: 2003 Malaysian Grand Prix
- Last win: 2018 United States Grand Prix
- Last entry: 2021 Abu Dhabi Grand Prix

World Rally Championship record
- Years active: 2009–2011
- Co-driver: (Finland) Kaj Lindström
- Teams: Citroën Junior; ICE 1
- Rallies: 21
- Championships: 0
- Rally wins: 0
- Podiums: 0
- Stage wins: 1
- Total points: 59
- First rally: 2009 Rally Finland
- Last rally: 2011 Wales Rally GB

Kimi-Matias Räikkönen (Finnish pronunciation: [ˈkimi ˈmɑtiɑs ˈræi̯kːønen]; born 17 October 1979) is a Finnish racing and rally driver who competed in Formula One between 2001 and 2021, (Note: The exact years Räikkönen competed in Formula One: 2001–2009, 2012–2021.) and the World Rally Championship from 2009 to 2011. Nicknamed "the Iceman", (Note: Räikkönen is nicknamed the Iceman for his calm demeanour and Finnish nationality; he is also known for his reserved personality and reluctance to participate in public relations events.) Räikkönen won the Formula One World Drivers' Championship in 2007 with Ferrari, and won 21 Grands Prix across 19 seasons.

Born in Espoo, Räikkönen began competitive kart racing aged 10, winning several national titles before graduating to junior formulae in 1999. He dominated the 2000 British Formula Renault Championship with Manor, prompting Sauber to sign him in Formula One for 2001. Following several points finishes across his rookie season, he joined McLaren in 2002, achieving his maiden podium on debut. He achieved his maiden victory at the Malaysian Grand Prix in 2003, as he finished runner-up to Michael Schumacher. Reliability issues with the MP4-19 saw him drop to seventh the following year, taking a sole victory in Belgium. He won seven Grands Prix as he finished runner-up to Fernando Alonso in 2005. After a winless 2006 campaign, Räikkönen moved to Ferrari; he took six victories as he beat Alonso and Lewis Hamilton to the 2007 World Drivers' Championship by a single point. He finished third in 2008, with victories in Malaysia and Spain. Replaced by Alonso for 2010, Räikkönen left Formula One at the end of his 2009 campaign, where he won the Belgian Grand Prix.

Having debuted in rallying at the 2009 Rally Finland, Räikkönen signed with the Citroën Junior Team in the World Rally Championship for 2010; he took a stage win at the Rallye Deutschland. He continued in Citroën machinery as a privateer in 2011 under the ICE 1 Racing banner, finishing tenth overall in both seasons. Räikkönen returned to Formula One with Lotus in 2012 and 2013, scoring their only victories at the 2012 Abu Dhabi and 2013 Australian Grands Prix. He re-joined Ferrari for 2014 to partner Alonso, who departed for Sebastian Vettel in 2015, when Räikkönen took several podiums as he finished fourth in the standings. Further podiums followed in 2016 and 2017. In 2018—his last season with Ferrari—Räikkönen achieved his final career win at the United States Grand Prix, a record 114 races after his previous, and clinched third in the championship. He moved to Alfa Romeo in 2019, remaining with the team through 2020 and 2021 before retiring from Formula One.

Räikkönen achieved the third-most fastest laps (46), seventh-most podium finishes (103), and third-most race starts (349)—all records for a Finnish driver, alongside his 21 victories—in Formula One history, where he still holds several records. Since his retirement, he has made one-off appearances in the NASCAR Cup Series in 2022 and 2023, and has served as team principal of Kawasaki in the Motocross World Championship since 2022.

== Early life and career ==
Kimi-Matias Räikkönen was born on 17 October 1979 in Espoo, Finland. He had success in karting from the age of ten. His first race outside Finland was in Monaco when he was 15 years old. During the race, the steering wheel broke, but he continued, informing his mechanic by frantically waving the steering wheel in the air on the home straight. Räikkönen's next Monaco race was also memorable; he was thrown on the wrong side of the safety fence in a collision but lifted his kart back onto the track and continued to race, finishing third. In 1998 he was first in the Nordic Championship at Varna in Norway. In 1999, Räikkönen placed second in a round of the European Formula Super A championship for the Dutch PDB Racing Team. He also competed in the Formula Ford Euro Cup. By the age of twenty, he had won the British Formula Renault winter series of 1999, winning the first four races of the year. In 2000, he won seven out of ten events in the Formula Renault UK Championship. Combined, over these two series of Formula Renault, he won 13 out of 23 events – a 57% win rate.

== Formula One career ==
=== Sauber (2001) ===
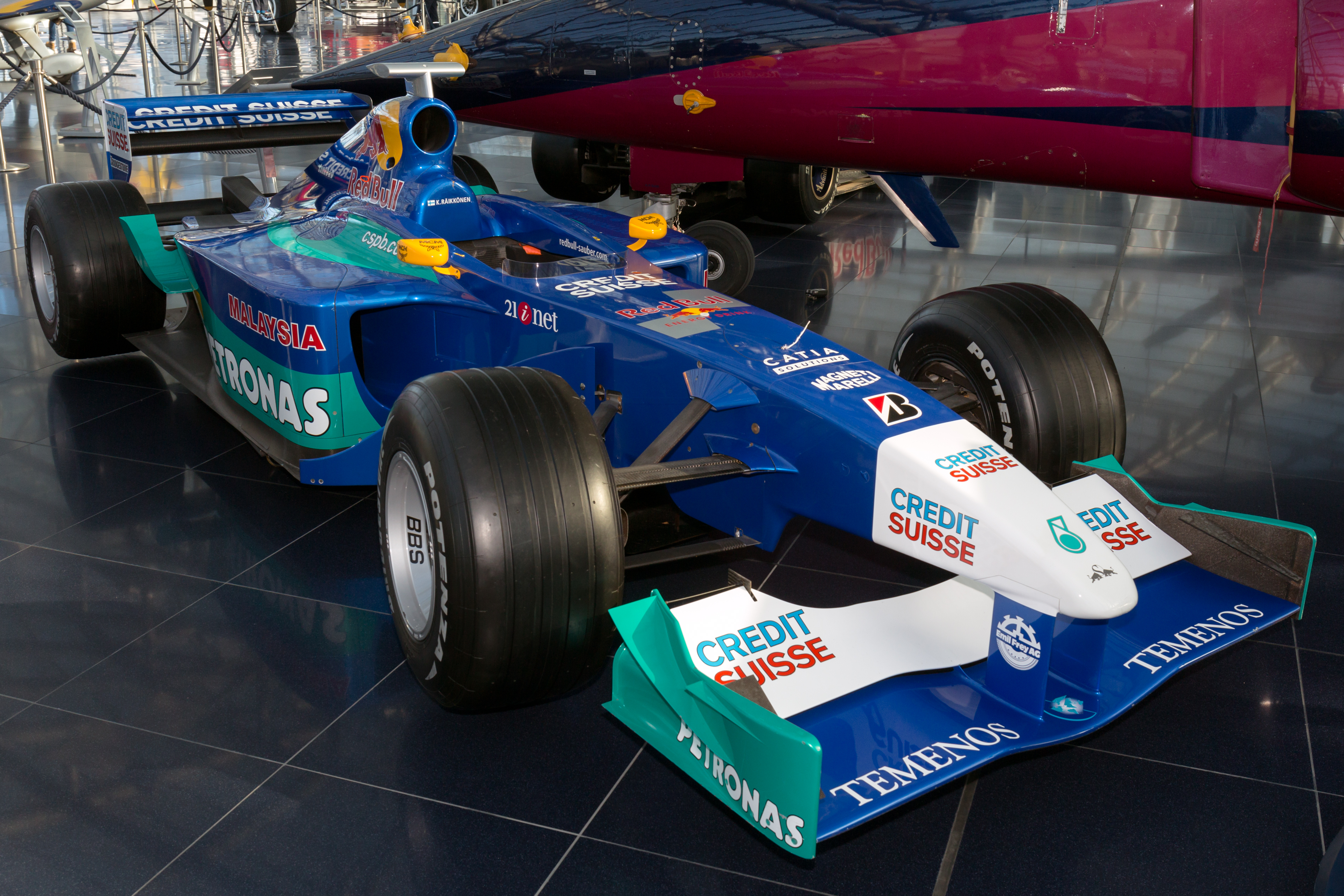
Sauber C20 of Räikkönen at Hangar-7

On the basis of these results, Peter Sauber gave the Finn a test with the Sauber Formula One team in September 2000 at the Mugello Circuit. On just the second day of the test, Räikkönen lapped half a second quicker than regular driver Pedro Diniz. Sauber had kept the news of his test quiet to distract potential competitors, internally referring to Räikkönen as "Eskimo". After further tests in Jerez and Barcelona, Sauber signed Räikkönen for the 2001 season. Although some critics (including FIA president Max Mosley) voiced concerns over granting an F1 Super Licence to such an inexperienced driver, he was nevertheless granted his licence from the Fédération Internationale de l'Automobile (FIA) after a performance delivery promise by his team boss, Peter Sauber. He scored a championship point in his debut at the 2001 Australian Grand Prix.

Räikkönen had a solid debut year, achieving four points-scoring finishes and eight finishes in the top eight. Completing the year with nine points, he helped Sauber to what was then its best result of fourth place in the Constructors' Championship.

=== McLaren (2002–2006) ===
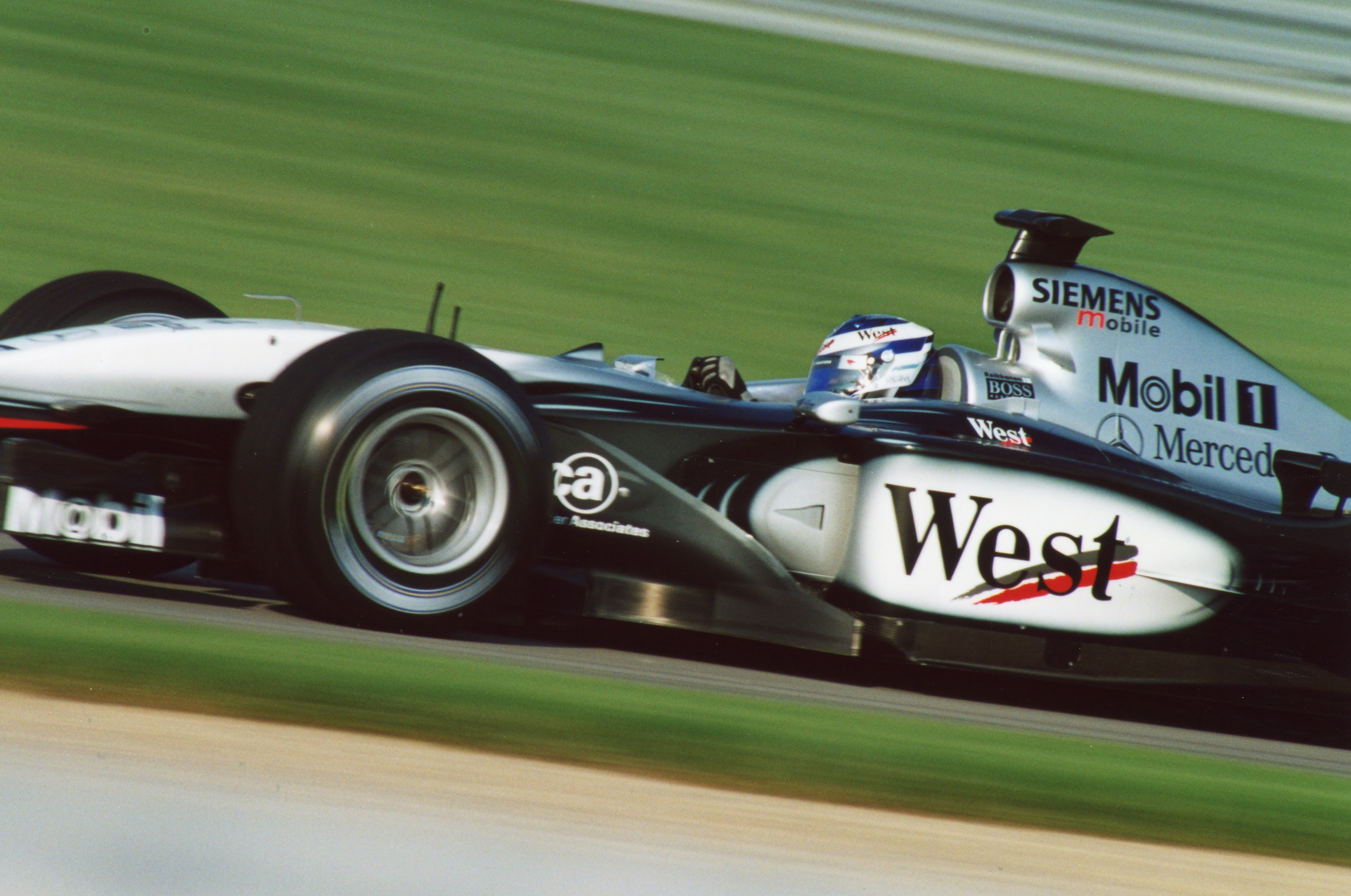
Räikkönen at the United States Grand Prix in 2002

Räikkönen, long linked to Sauber's engine supplier Ferrari, sufficiently impressed McLaren to earn a race seat in Ron Dennis's team for 2002, taking the seat left vacant by double-world champion and mentor Mika Häkkinen. The decision to choose Räikkönen over his Sauber teammate Nick Heidfeld was heavily influenced by Häkkinen, who repeatedly told Ron Dennis "If you wanna win, get the Finn."

==== 2002 ====
Räikkönen scored a third-place podium finish in his first race with McLaren at the 2002 Australian Grand Prix. He came close to winning his first Grand Prix in France but went off track with a handful of laps to go because of oil on the circuit. He finished second. He finished the season in sixth place, with 24 points and four podiums, and McLaren achieved a solid third place in the Constructors' Championship.

==== 2003: Maiden win ====
At the season-opening Australian Grand Prix, Räikkönen qualified 15th. In the race he took the lead before being caught speeding in the pitlane, finishing third. In Malaysia, Räikkönen won his first race. During the next round in Brazil, Räikkönen was declared the winner after the race was stopped on lap 55. According to the rules the winner is decided by the race order as of two laps before the race stopped, i.e. lap 53. However a week later, evidence emerged that Giancarlo Fisichella was on lap 56 when the race stopped, therefore the winner was decided by the order at lap 54. This granted the win to Fisichella.

Räikkönen finished second at Imola. At the Spanish Grand Prix, Räikkönen made a mistake in qualifying and had to start from the back of the grid. At the start of the race, he collided with Antônio Pizzonia, causing Räikkönen to retire. He successfully defended second position from Rubens Barrichello in Austria. He lost in Monaco by less than a second. Starting from the pitlane in Canada after he went off track during qualifying, Räikkönen finished sixth.

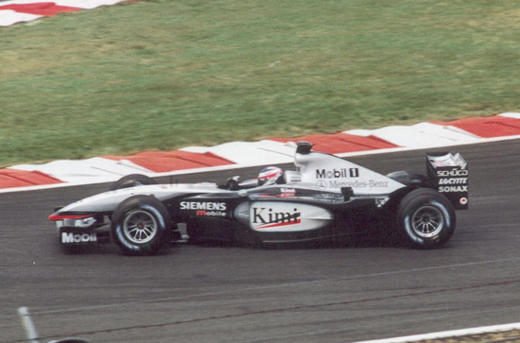
Räikkönen at the 2003 French Grand Prix

At the European Grand Prix, Räikkönen took pole, and controlled the race from the start until his engine failed on lap 25. Title rival Michael Schumacher finished fifth taking 4 points advantage from Räikkönen. Räikkönen finished fourth in France behind Schumacher, but finished one point ahead of him with a third-place finish at the British Grand Prix. Räikkönen failed to finish the German Grand Prix after being involved in an accident at the first corner with Ralf Schumacher and Rubens Barrichello. Räikkönen finished second at the next race, the Hungarian Grand Prix. At the Italian Grand Prix, Räikkönen finished fourth.

Räikkönen took pole at the United States Grand Prix, but Michael Schumacher won the race with Räikkönen finishing second. After qualifying eighth in Japan, Räikkönen finished second while Michael Schumacher just slipped into the points to win his sixth World Championship. Montoya's retirement during the race also meant that Räikkönen finished second in the championship, just two points behind Schumacher. The team also narrowly lost second place in the Constructors' Championship, finishing third, two points behind runners-up Williams, and 12 points behind Ferrari.

==== 2004 ====
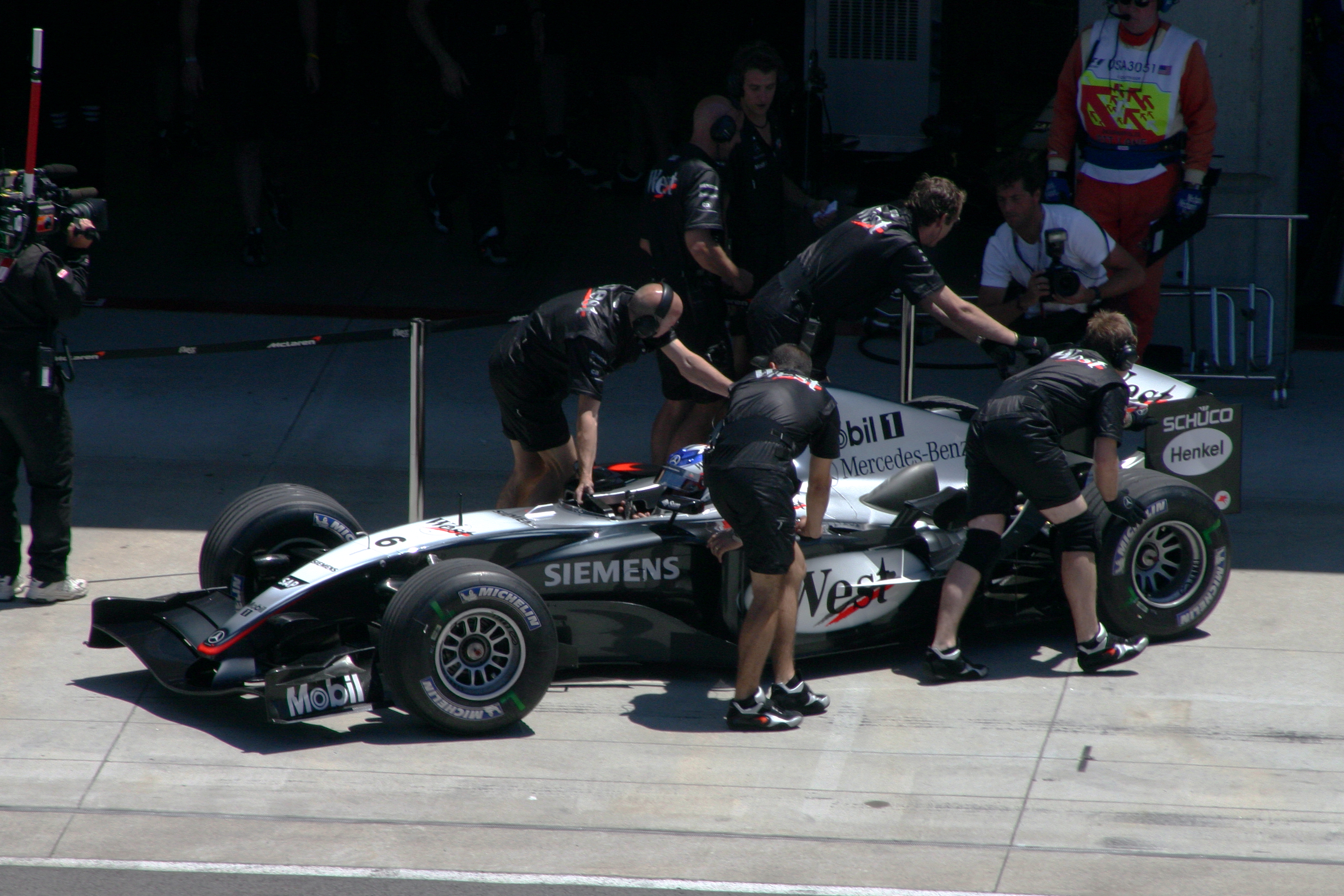
The McLaren mechanics push Räikkönen's MP4-19 into the garage during qualifying at the 2004 United States Grand Prix.

The 2004 season began with Räikkönen only claiming a single point in the first seven races. His McLaren, especially the Mercedes engine, suffered repeated breakdowns, allowing him to complete just two of the first seven events. After seven rounds Räikkönen had only one point to Michael Schumacher's 60. In Canada, Räikkönen made five pit-stops but was classified fifth since the Williams-BMWs and the two Toyotas were disqualified. At the United States Grand Prix, Räikkönen finished sixth.

At the French Grand Prix, McLaren rolled out the new MP4-19B. Räikkönen finished seventh behind his team-mate, David Coulthard. At Silverstone, Räikkönen took pole and went on to finish second behind Michael Schumacher. The McLarens qualified on the second row of the grid in Germany. Räikkönen lost his rear wing on lap 13 of the race while following race leader Michael Schumacher. He retired again from the Hungarian Grand Prix after starting from 10th place on the grid, again on lap 13. At the Belgian Grand Prix, Räikkönen qualified 10th, but took the lead on lap 11 and held onto it to take McLaren's only win of the season. He also took the fastest lap. The next weekend at Monza, Räikkönen again retired on lap 13, this time owing to electrical problems. At the next race in China, he finished third, only 1.4 seconds behind race winner Rubens Barrichello.

At the Japanese Grand Prix, Räikkönen was shunted by Felipe Massa on the first lap of the race, which caused him handling problems. He finished sixth, 2.5 seconds behind Fernando Alonso. At the last race of the season, the Brazilian Grand Prix, he battled Montoya for the lead and finished one second behind him in second. Räikkönen ended the year seventh, with 45 points, only one behind sixth placed Jarno Trulli, and four podiums.

Despite the disappointment of the 2004 season, Räikkönen was still seen as one of the rising stars of the sport. Many pundits predicted 2005 to be filled with great on-track battles from a resurgent team. He was also referred to by Ross Brawn and Jean Todt as a driver whom Ferrari might consider in the future. In early November 2004, Räikkönen announced his intention to create a racing team with his manager Steve Robertson, to be entitled Räikkönen Robertson Racing (otherwise known as "Double R"), which would compete in Formula Three in 2005.

==== 2005: Runner up to Alonso ====
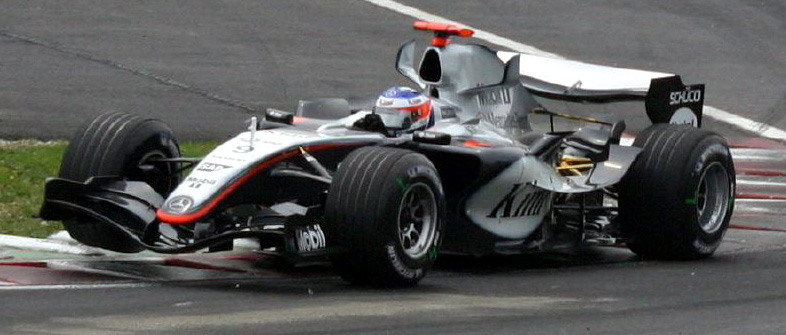
Räikkönen at the 2005 Canadian Grand Prix

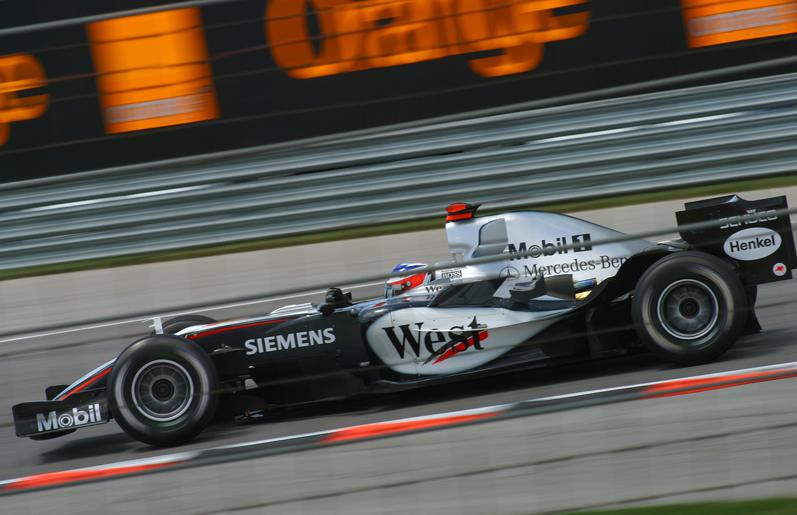
Räikkönen at the 2005 United States Grand Prix

Räikkönen's start to the 2005 season was less than perfect. The car was reported to be too soft on its Michelin tyres, with the result that it was not generating enough heat to post competitive qualifying times. The best qualifying position that a McLaren driver could manage in the first three races was sixth. Räikkönen compounded this by stalling on the grid of the first race of the season, the Australian Grand Prix, and ending the race with just a point. He looked set for a podium in Malaysia until a faulty tyre valve failed and dropped him out of the points. Bahrain saw him achieve his first podium of the season with a third place behind Renault's Alonso and the Toyota of Jarno Trulli.

Räikkönen then achieved three consecutive poles in San Marino, Spain, and a win after a safety car strategy call by Neil Martin at Monaco. An almost certain win was denied at Imola after a driveshaft failure, but he won the other two races, putting him within 22 points of leader Alonso. He registered strong, comfortable wins at Barcelona, beating Alonso, and at Monte Carlo, never dropping his lead in both races. At the European Grand Prix, Räikkönen flat-spotted his right front tyre, causing his suspension to fail while he led on the final lap, handing a further ten points to his rival Alonso. This incident, in part, resulted in a rules clarification allowing teams to change a flat-spotted tyre without punishment.

Alonso's first major mistake of the 2005 season handed the Canadian Grand Prix to Räikkönen. The following weekend saw all the Michelin teams, including McLaren, withdraw from the United States Grand Prix for safety reasons. At the French Grand Prix, Räikkönen suffered a ten-place grid-penalty following the replacement of his new specification Mercedes Benz engine which failed in Friday practice. Räikkönen, putting in what Ron Dennis called his best ever qualifying lap, qualified third (demoted to 13th) with a significant fuel load. He finished second behind Alonso. A week later at the British Grand Prix, Räikkönen suffered another Mercedes engine failure due to an oil leak; his second-place qualifying place became 12th. He claimed third place in the race.

In Germany, Räikkönen was comfortably in the lead having dominated all weekend, but suffered a hydraulics failure, handing victory and a further 10 points to Alonso. It was his third retirement while leading a race during the season. At the opening of the Hungarian Grand Prix, though saying he was very comfortable at McLaren, Räikkönen raised the possibility that he might leave McLaren when his contract expired in 2006, if reliability issues were not solved. He went on to take the chequered flag with a convincing victory over Michael Schumacher, albeit after McLaren teammate Montoya retired.

Räikkönen won the Hungarian Grand Prix from the most handicapped qualifying position, having had to do his qualifying run first on the notoriously dusty and dirty track because of his early retirement a week earlier at Hockenheim. No other driver had previously managed this feat. Räikkönen then became the first ever winner of the Turkish Grand Prix. Two weeks later at the Italian Grand Prix, Räikkönen's pole position was taken from him as he received another 10-position grid penalty for an engine change. He eventually finished fourth.

Räikkönen went on to win for the second year in a row in Belgium at Spa-Francorchamps. The following race, the Brazilian Grand Prix, saw Alonso clinch the Drivers' Championship after finishing third behind Montoya and Räikkönen. In the penultimate race of the year, at the Suzuka Circuit in Japan, Räikkönen took his seventh victory of the season after starting 17th on the grid. The win was secured when he overtook Renault driver Fisichella (who had started third on the grid, and had led most of the race) on the final lap – which Formula One journalist Peter Windsor thought the most impressive move of the race.

Räikkönen received the F1 Racing "Driver of the Year" accolade, and the Autosport "International Racing Driver of the Year" award.

==== 2006: Final season at McLaren ====
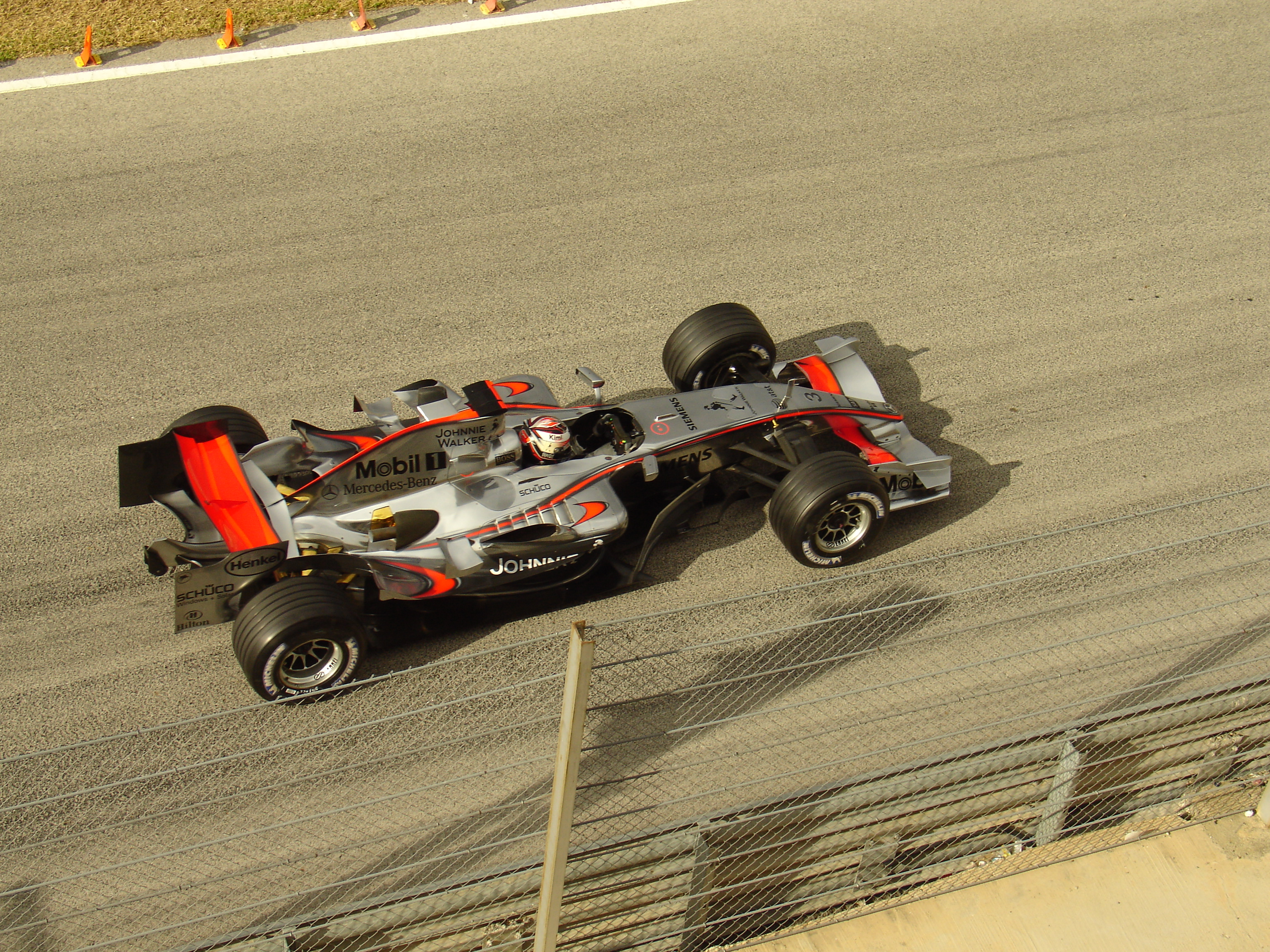
Räikkönen testing for McLaren at Valencia in early 2006

In Bahrain, starting from 22nd place on the grid, he drove through the field, ending third behind Alonso and Michael Schumacher. In Malaysia, Räikkönen was hit from behind by Red Bull Racing's Christian Klien on the first lap and retired.

Having started the year clearly behind Renault, McLaren improved in Australia, where Räikkönen finished second after flat spotting a tyre and losing a wing end-plate. Chasing down Alonso during the final stages of the race, he set the fastest lap of the race on the final lap, finishing only 1.8 seconds behind the Spaniard. At the San Marino Grand Prix, a bad choice of strategy and a mistake from Räikkönen in qualifying saw the McLarens get caught in traffic in the early part of the race allowing Michael Schumacher and Alonso to get away at the front. Räikkönen eventually finished fifth, with teammate Montoya ahead in third place. McLaren team boss Ron Dennis blamed what he deemed to be Räikkönen's poor performance for the team's failure to finish in the top two in the race.

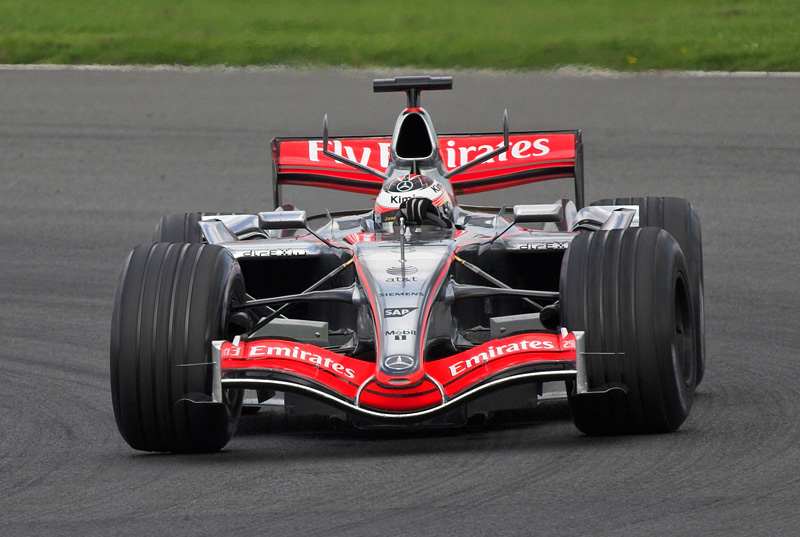
Räikkönen testing for McLaren at Silverstone in April 2006

At the Spanish Grand Prix, Räikkönen qualified ninth. However, he managed to get up to fifth place on the first lap of the race. He retained this position for most of the race, finishing in fifth place. A few days after the Spanish Grand Prix, he admitted that he had no chance of winning the 2006 Championship. In Monaco, Räikkönen qualified third. During the race he got up to second and kept pace with Alonso, however he retired during a safety car period after a failed heat shield led to a wiring loom inside the car catching fire. After his retirement from this race, he was seen on live TV walking along the Monaco sidewalks still wearing his helmet, before going straight to the harbour instead of the pits and climbing aboard a yacht.

The British Grand Prix at Silverstone saw Räikkönen qualify second behind Alonso and in front of Michael Schumacher. The running order was Alonso, Räikkönen, Schumacher until the second set of pitstops where Räikkönen was demoted to third by Schumacher, a position he held until the end of the race. In Canada, Räikkönen achieved another podium. In the United States Grand Prix, his teammate punted him out in an expensive seven car accident. The French Grand Prix saw Räikkönen qualify his car in sixth. His teammate was now former test driver Pedro de la Rosa in place of Montoya. Räikkönen ended the race in fifth. In Germany, Räikkönen qualified on pole. After a battle with Jenson Button, he finished the race for the first time in his career, ending in third place. Another pole came in Hungary, but he collided with Vitantonio Liuzzi after 25 laps, causing his fourth retirement of the season.

A first turn incident with Scott Speed at the Turkish Grand Prix led to an exploded tyre and suspension damage. After a tyre change, Räikkönen's race ended halfway into the next lap when he crashed into the barrier at turn 4 because of a loss of rear grip. Räikkönen qualified on pole for the Italian Grand Prix by two thousandths of a second from Michael Schumacher. He led the early part of the race until the first pitstops where he was passed by Schumacher. He stayed in second place for the rest of the race. After the race, Schumacher announced that he would retire at the end of the season. Later, Ferrari announced that he would be replaced in the 2007 season by Räikkönen.

The Chinese Grand Prix saw another retirement for Räikkönen due to throttle problems. His last two Grands Prix, in Japan and Brazil, did lead to two finishes, but he missed the podium on both occasions. Räikkönen ended his time at McLaren-Mercedes with a fifth place in the World Drivers' Championship, with McLaren placing third in the World Constructors' Championship at the end of a winless year.

Räikkönen's British Formula 3 Championship team Räikkönen Robertson Racing claimed their first major success, with British driver Mike Conway winning the 2006 British F3 International Series title and the prestigious Macau Grand Prix.

=== Ferrari (2007–2009) ===
After the 2006 Italian Grand Prix, Ferrari announced that Räikkönen had signed a three-year contract with Scuderia Ferrari for the 2007–2009 seasons. Räikkönen said after the move that he was very happy with this change of events but wished McLaren the best of luck in the future. He became the teammate to Brazilian Felipe Massa, who had been driving for Ferrari since 2006.

==== 2007: World Drivers' Champion ====
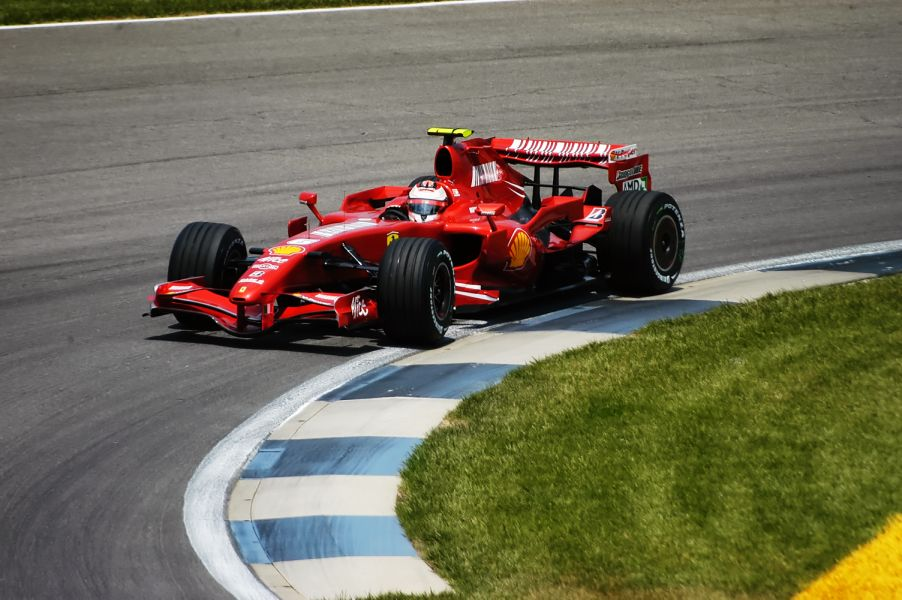
Räikkönen driving for Ferrari at the 2007 United States Grand Prix, where he finished fourth

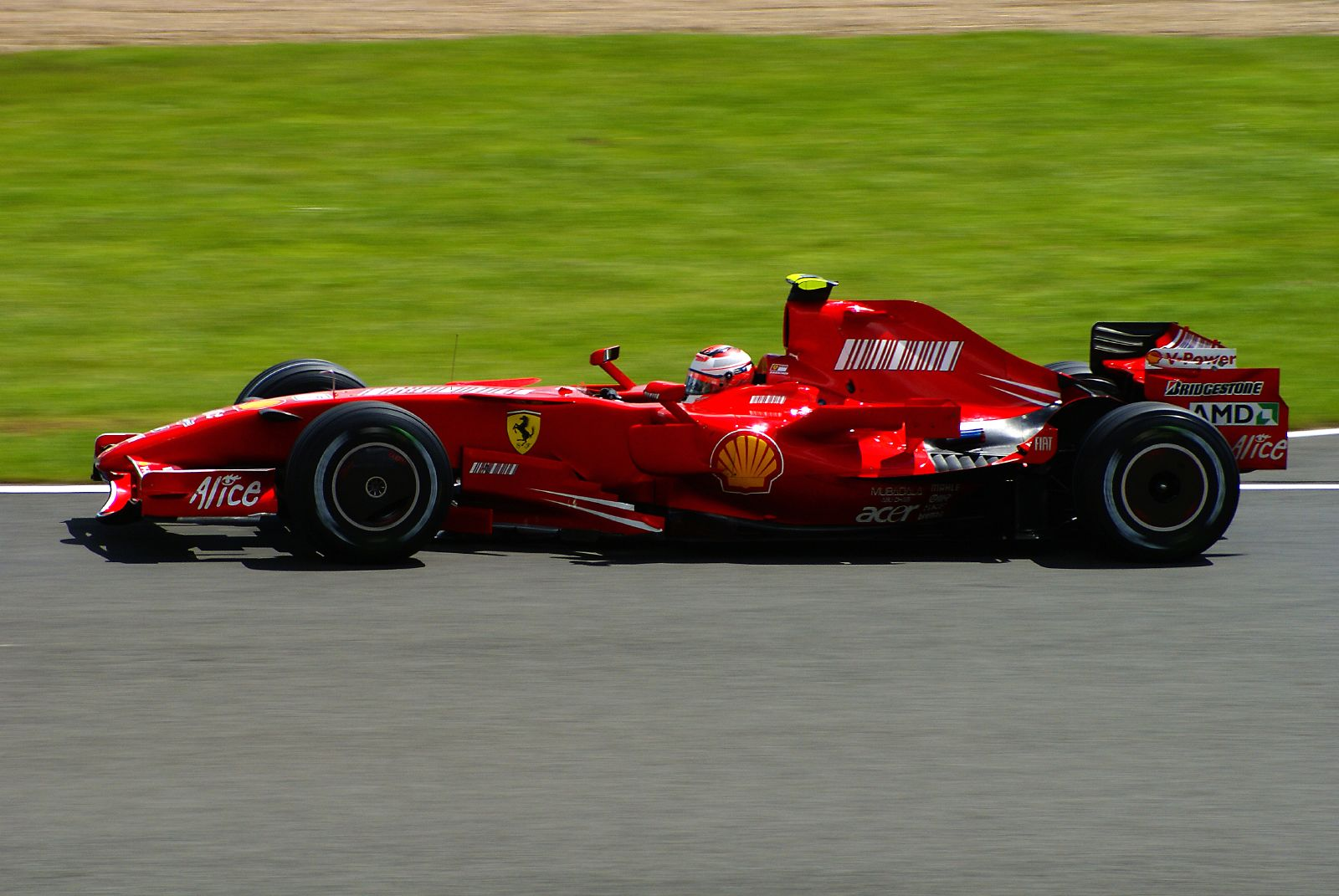
Räikkönen won his third race of 2007 at Silverstone.

Räikkönen started the season in Australia by taking pole position, setting the fastest lap, and becoming the first driver since Nigel Mansell in 1989 to win his first Grand Prix with Ferrari.

At the Malaysian Grand Prix, Räikkönen was passed by Lewis Hamilton at the start and remained behind him for the rest of the race, finishing third. In Bahrain, Räikkönen started from third but was passed by McLaren driver Fernando Alonso. He eventually regained third position from Alonso and finished the race third. At the Spanish Grand Prix, Räikkönen retired after only 10 laps with an electrical problem. This took him down to fourth position in the Championship, behind team-mate Felipe Massa. At the Monaco Grand Prix, Räikkönen struck a barrier in qualifying and broke his right front suspension. He started 16th and finished eighth.

In Canada, Räikkönen qualified fourth and finished fifth, Räikkönen's team-mate Massa was disqualified. At the United States Grand Prix, Räikkönen qualified fourth, finished fourth and recorded fastest lap of the race. With ten races in the season left, Räikkönen was 26 points behind leader Lewis Hamilton in the Drivers' Championship.

In France, Räikkönen qualified third, but overtook Hamilton at the first corner of the race. He subsequently ran second, behind teammate Massa, for much of the Grand Prix, but overtook the Brazilian during the pit stops and took his second victory of the season. This was the 11th victory of his Formula One career and Ferrari's first 1–2 win of the 2007 season. At the British Grand Prix, Räikkönen qualified in second place, just missing the pole by running wide in the last corner. In the race, he again took the lead through pit stops, first overtaking Lewis Hamilton midway through the race and then putting in fast laps as Alonso pitted for the second time in the closing stages to pass him. Räikkönen led to the end of the race.

At the European Grand Prix, Räikkönen captured his second pole position of the season but retired from the race, run in heavy rain, with a problem with the hydraulics of the car. In Hungary, Räikkönen qualified his car in fourth place, but started from third after Alonso was penalised. In the race he overtook Nick Heidfeld at the start and pressured Hamilton until the end, but had to settle for second, being 0.7s behind Hamilton. He set the fastest lap time on the last lap of the race, commenting after the race: "I was so bored behind Hamilton, I wanted to see how quick I could have been". In Turkey, Räikkönen missed pole position after making a mistake in the final sector of his fast lap, which left him third on the grid. On race day, he overtook Hamilton in the first corner and took second place, which he kept to the end of the race.

At Monza's third practice session, Räikkönen crashed into the tyre wall before entering the Ascari chicane. He qualified in fifth place, and raced in the Ferrari reserve car while suffering from a neck problem. The Ferrari team employed an unusual one-stop strategy, which left him third after Hamilton passed him late in the race on fresh tyres. At Spa-Francorchamps, Räikkönen's favourite circuit, he secured pole position again and took his fourth victory of the season. Massa finished second, Alonso third and Hamilton fourth. This was also Räikkönen's third consecutive Spa win, which placed him among six other drivers with three or more Spa wins.

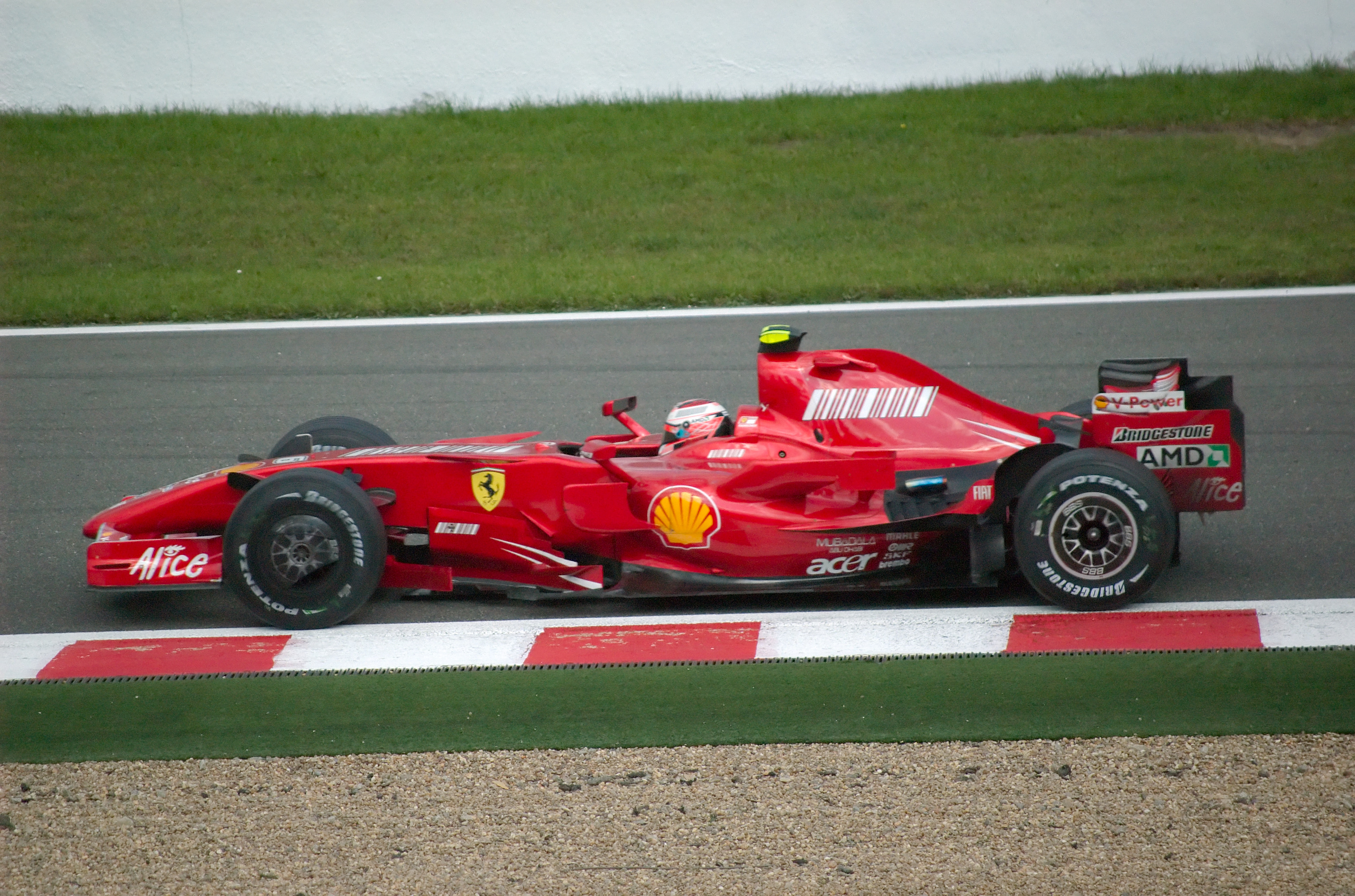
Räikkönen at Spa, where he won his fourth race of the year

At the Fuji Speedway in Japan, the only new track on the 2007 calendar, Räikkönen qualified in third position, while Hamilton took pole and Alonso second. In an extremely wet race, which saw the first 19 laps run behind the safety car, both Räikkönen and teammate Massa were badly affected by having to change to extreme wet tyres during the early stages, because the FIA's tyre-rule notification arrived late at Ferrari. Towards the end of the race, Räikkönen moved through the field to third place, but could not pass his fellow countryman Heikki Kovalainen for second.

At the Chinese Grand Prix in Shanghai, Räikkönen dominated the whole weekend with fastest laps in the free-practice sessions. In qualifying, Hamilton took pole position with a lighter fuel load, while Räikkönen qualified second and Massa third. There was light rainfall at the beginning of the race which prompted the cars to start on intermediate tyres. After the first round of pit stops Hamilton lost grip as his tyres suffered graining, and Räikkönen overtook him. Hamilton retired after sliding into a gravel trap in the pit lane. Räikkönen took his fifth win of the season, that revived his title hopes before the last race of the season. This was also the 200th race win and 600th podium in a World Championship event for Ferrari as a manufacturer (as a team, their 200th win was achieved at the next race in Brazil, and their 600th podium was achieved in 2008 Bahrain Grand Prix). Räikkönen moved to seven and three points behind Hamilton and Alonso in the Drivers' Championship, respectively, going into the last race in Brazil, the first three-way title battle in the final race of the season since 1986.

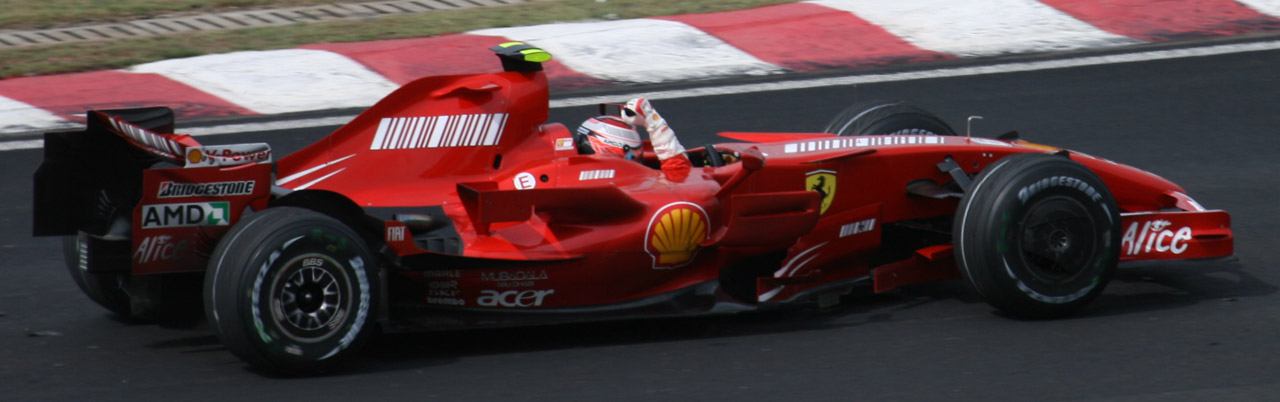
Räikkönen celebrating victory and the world title at the 2007 Brazilian Grand Prix

Räikkönen took the 2007 Formula One Drivers' title with victory in the Brazilian Grand Prix at Interlagos, in an incident-packed race. Massa had taken pole, followed by Hamilton, Räikkönen, and Alonso. At the start of the race Räikkönen passed Hamilton on the outside and lined up behind Massa. Alonso shortly afterwards passed Hamilton, who fell progressively down the order. Räikkönen eventually overtook Massa, who was already eliminated from contention for the Drivers' Championship in the Japanese Grand Prix. Massa's strategy for the second round of pit stops ensured Räikkönen kept the lead. Räikkönen went on to take the chequered flag, which handed him the crown by a single point from Hamilton and Alonso. Championship leader Hamilton eventually finished the race in seventh place, while defending champion Alonso managed third.

While Räikkönen had only one point more than Alonso and Hamilton at the end of the season, he had the most victories (six compared to four by each McLaren driver).

Räikkönen's Drivers' Championship was briefly put into doubt when race stewards began an investigation after identifying possible fuel irregularities in the cars of Nico Rosberg, Robert Kubica and Nick Heidfeld following post-race inspection. Their disqualification and a race reclassification would have seen Hamilton lifted from seventh to fourth in the race result. However the race stewards decided that no sanctions would be given, meaning the results would stand. McLaren appealed the decision, however the FIA Court of Appeal rejected their appeal on 16 November 2007 thus confirming Räikkönen as the champion. As of the end of the 2025 Formula One season, Räikkönen's 2007 title triumph remains the most recent World Drivers' Championship win for a Scuderia Ferrari driver.

In January 2008, Räikkönen was beaten by Tero Pitkämäki in the race for the annually chosen Finnish Sports Personality of the Year award; finishing in second place in the competition.

==== 2008 ====
After a disappointing first race in Australia, where Räikkönen eventually finished eighth after qualifying only 15th due to a mechanical problem, he won his first race of the 2008 season at the Malaysian Grand Prix, finishing ahead of Robert Kubica and Heikki Kovalainen. His victory in Kuala Lumpur came on the fifth anniversary of his maiden victory at the same track. In Bahrain, Räikkönen qualified in fourth on the grid. He moved up to second place by the third lap and finished in that position, behind his team-mate Felipe Massa. He also secured the lead in the championship.

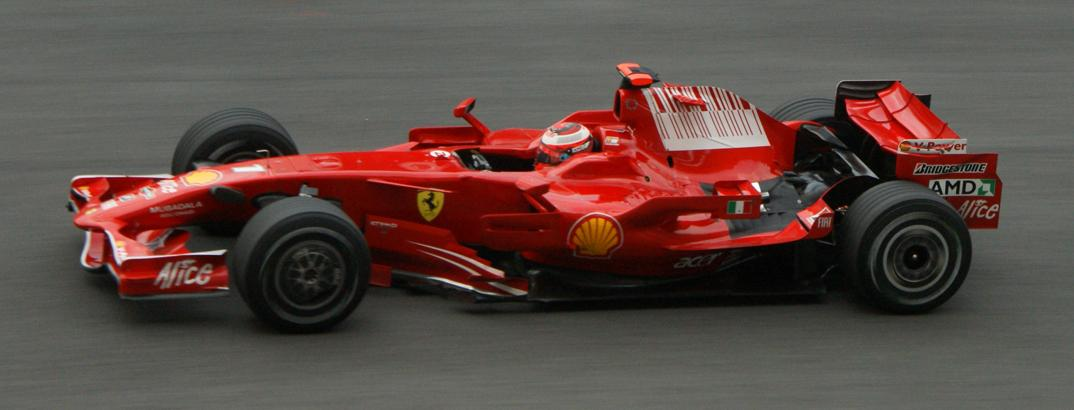
Räikkönen took his first win of 2008 at the Malaysian Grand Prix.

In Spain, Räikkönen took the 15th pole of his career and his first of the 2008 season. He managed to take his second race win of the season and the fastest lap of the race. Räikkönen overtook Mika Häkkinen in the list of total number of fastest laps and also in terms of podium finishes, making him the highest-ranked Finnish driver in these statistics.

At the Turkish Grand Prix, Räikkönen qualified in fourth place. Despite damaging his front wing in the early stages after a collision with fellow Finn Heikki Kovalainen, Räikkönen was still able to set the fastest lap and finish in third place.

In Monaco, Räikkönen qualified in second behind teammate Felipe Massa. Räikkönen stayed second behind Massa until he was given a drive-through penalty for an infringement by the team on his car and dropped down to sixth. He was set for fifth until an incident with Adrian Sutil, when Räikkönen lost control on the damp track after exiting the tunnel, and hit Sutil's car in the rear. Räikkönen's car was not badly damaged and he was able to finish in ninth after replacing his front wing, also setting the fastest lap in the process. After the race, Mike Gascoyne, the Chief Technology Officer of Force India announced they were filing official protests with the stewards over the incident, demanding a ban for Räikkönen. However, the stewards decided not to penalise him.

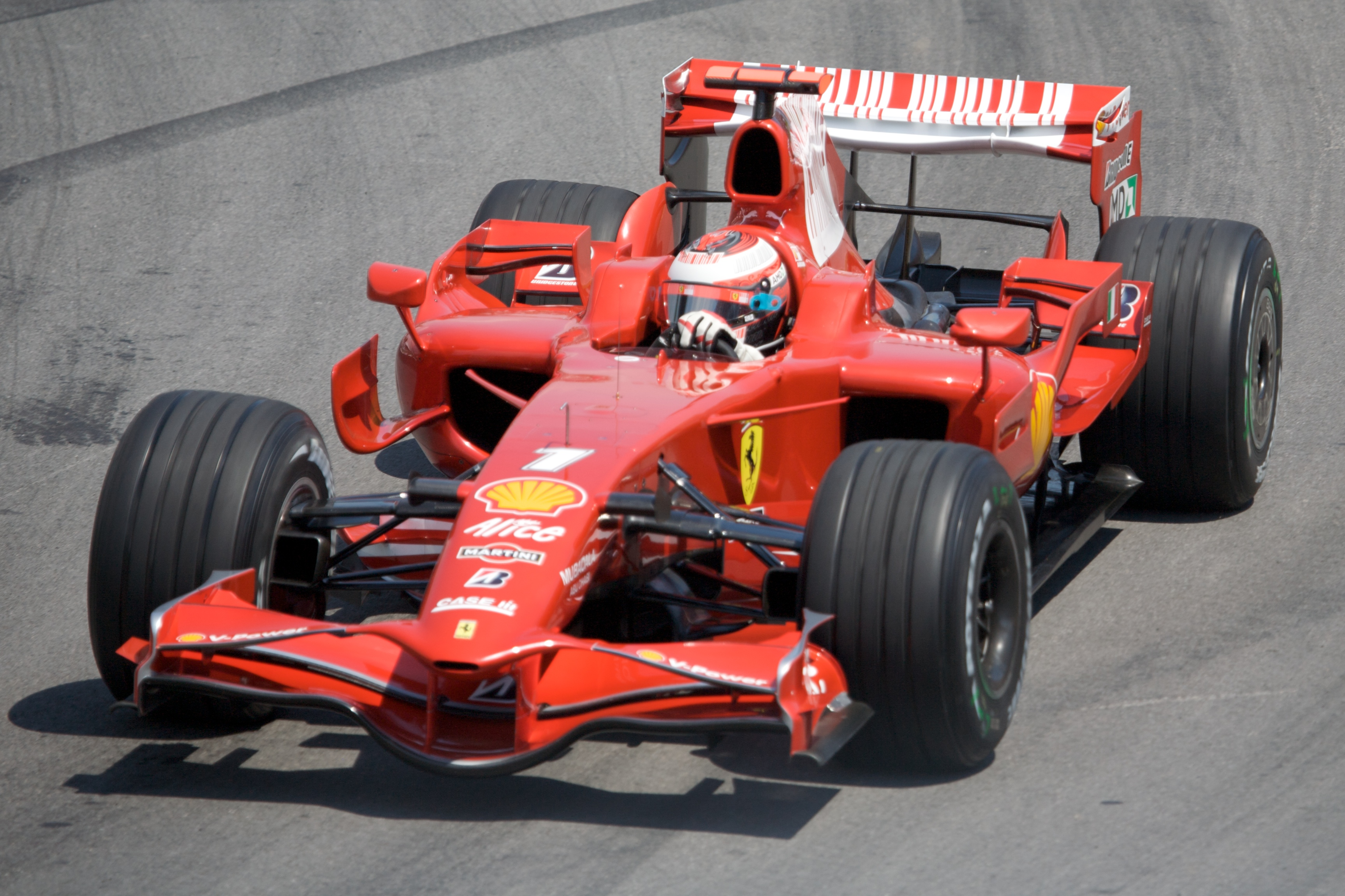
Räikkönen driving for Ferrari at the 2008 Canadian Grand Prix

In Canada, Räikkönen qualified third. In the race, he set the fastest lap during the first stint while catching up with Robert Kubica who was in second place. The safety car was deployed when Adrian Sutil's car broke down in a dangerous position. Both he and Kubica jumped ahead of race leader Hamilton when they pitted during the safety car period. As there was a red light at the end of the pitlane, Räikkönen and Kubica stopped alongside each other and waited for the signal to allow them back onto the circuit. Hamilton failed to notice the red light and hit the rear of Räikkönen's Ferrari, eliminating both cars.

Räikkönen went on to take his 16th pole position in France, which was the 200th pole for Scuderia Ferrari. Räikkönen dominated the race as he set the fastest lap and had a six-second lead until a bank exhaust failure some halfway through the race reduced his engine's power. He gave up the lead to his teammate Massa, but was far enough ahead of Toyota's Jarno Trulli, to secure second place and eight points.

Räikkönen qualified third at the British Grand Prix. Before the race, Räikkönen pushed noted photographer Paul-Henri Cahier to the ground as he lined up a close-up shot. Räikkönen's manager Steve Robertson claimed the driver was provoked by Cahier touching him with his lens and standing on his belongings, but Cahier disputed this version of events. The race was in wet conditions and Räikkönen stayed third at the first corner behind Hamilton and Kovalainen. He kept pace and got up to second when Kovalainen spun. He then chased after Hamilton, and set the fastest lap as he drew up directly behind the McLaren. During the first pitstop, Ferrari did not change the intermediates on his car in the hope that the track would become dry. However, the track was hit by another shower, and Räikkönen rapidly lost pace, and dropped down to sixth before finally pitting for new tyres. He finished fourth, a lap down.

At the German Grand Prix, Räikkönen qualified sixth and dropped down a place at the first corner. He was running fifth when the safety car came out after a crash involving Timo Glock. His teammate Felipe Massa was ahead of him on the track, and as a result, Räikkönen was forced to wait behind Massa when the pitlane opened. This dropped him down to 12th, but he eventually finished in sixth.

At the Hungarian Grand Prix, Räikkönen again qualified sixth. He lost a position to Alonso at the beginning of the race but managed to finish third owing to Hamilton's tyre puncture, passing Alonso during the pitstops and Massa's retirement after an engine failure.

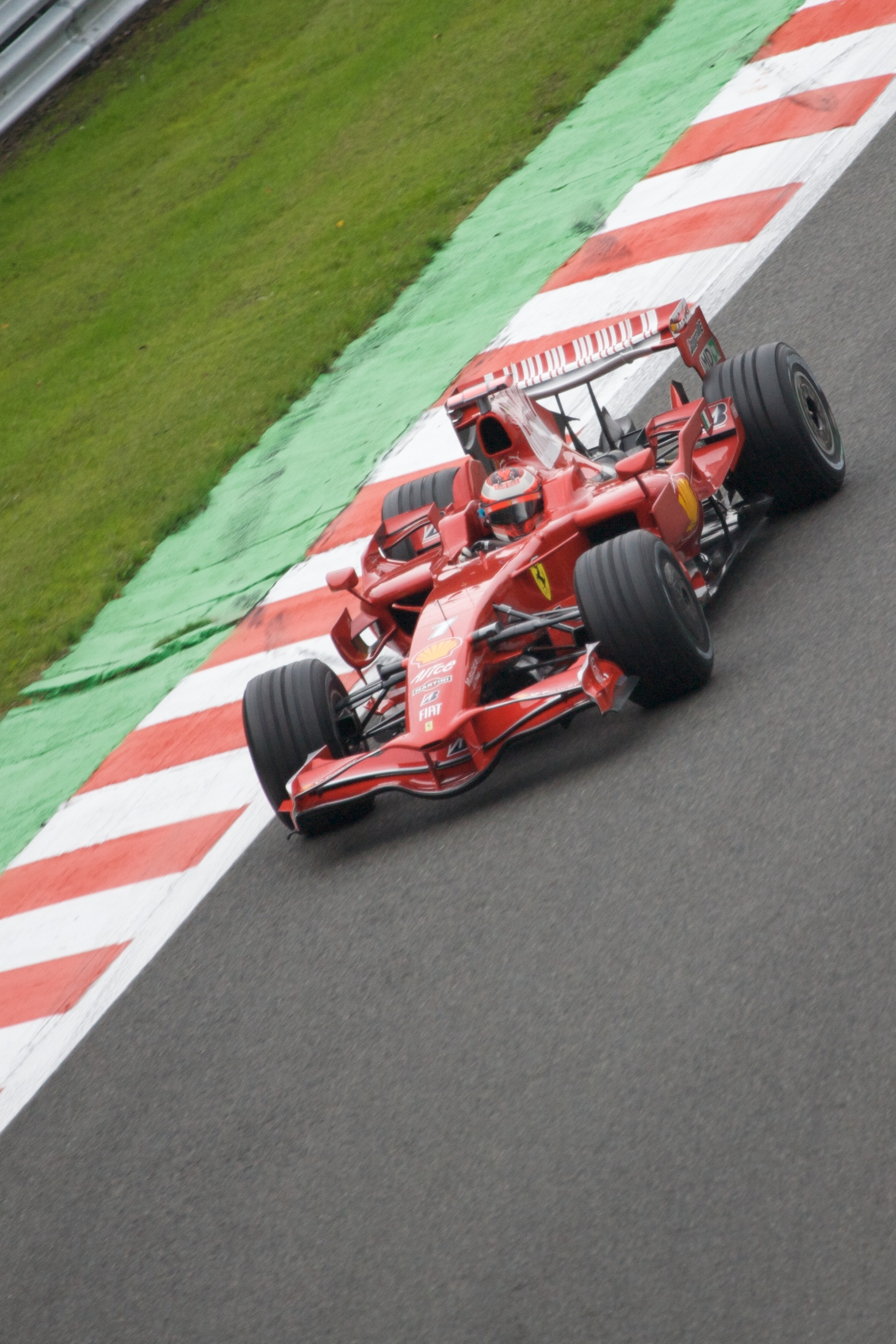
Räikkönen at the 2008 Belgian Grand Prix, where he crashed on the penultimate lap after a duel with Lewis Hamilton

During the European Grand Prix, Räikkönen qualified fourth and lost a place at the start to Kovalainen. He stayed fifth until the second round of pitstops when he exited before the fuel hose was properly disengaged from his car and left one of the mechanics with a fractured toe. Two laps later, he suffered a similar engine failure to Massa in the previous race; a connecting rod in his engine broke and he was forced to retire.

At the Belgian Grand Prix, Räikkönen again qualified fourth. He passed Kovalainen and Massa at the start to be second, and took the lead from Hamilton on the second lap. He pulled away, setting the fastest lap of the race and built a five-second gap. He looked set to win but owing to a late-race rain shower, Hamilton closed right up to him and tried to pass him at the final chicane with two laps to go. Hamilton cut the chicane and rejoined ahead of Räikkönen. He let Räikkönen take the place back. Hamilton then repassed him for the lead. The two battled on for the rest of the lap, with Räikkönen retaking the lead when the two stumbled upon spinning backmarker Nico Rosberg, forcing Hamilton onto the grass. Räikkönen spun at the next corner and fell behind Hamilton again. While trying to catch up, he lost control of the car, smashed into a wall and retired.

At the Italian Grand Prix, which was held in extremely wet conditions, Räikkönen qualified 14th. He stayed in 14th position for the first two stints. He climbed to ninth position in the third and last stint in which he also set the fastest lap of the race.

In Singapore, the first night event in Formula One history, Räikkönen qualified third behind Massa and Hamilton. He remained in this position for most of the early laps. On lap 14, Nelson Piquet Jr.'s Renault hit the wall at turn 17 and the safety car was deployed. Both Ferrari drivers pitted during the safety car period, with Räikkönen queued behind Massa in a busy pitlane. Ferrari released Massa before the fuel hose was disconnected from the car, which compromised Räikkönen who rejoined in 16th. Räikkönen managed to climb to fifth place, but on lap 57, while attacking Timo Glock, he hit the wall after pushing too hard at turn 10 and retired. He set the fastest lap of the race as his 10th of the season. This equalled Michael Schumacher's 2004 record of ten fastest laps in a Formula One season.

At the Japanese Grand Prix at the Fuji Speedway circuit, Räikkönen qualified second on the grid, behind Hamilton, and took the lead at the start. Closing up to turn one, Hamilton attempted to pass on the inside, braked late and went wide, forcing Räikkönen to also go wide. Räikkönen lost out heavily and went down to seventh position. He gained places after a collision between Hamilton and Massa, Kovalainen's hydraulic failure and an overtaking manoeuvre on Jarno Trulli. He eventually finished third, behind Renault's Alonso and BMW Sauber's Robert Kubica. This result meant that it was impossible for Räikkönen to retain his Drivers' Championship title for the second year.

In China, Räikkönen qualified second behind Hamilton. At the start he stayed second with his teammate and now Ferrari's world championship contender, Massa, behind him in third place. However, with Räikkönen out of the running for the world championship he let Massa through into second place on lap 49, to help the latter gain two additional points in his pursuit of Hamilton in the world championship race.

At the Brazilian Grand Prix, Räikkönen qualified third and finished third, behind Massa and Alonso. As Kubica failed to score, he finished third in the championship.

Räikkönen also won the DHL Fastest Lap Award for the second year in a row. He set 10 fastest laps throughout the season.

==== 2009 ====
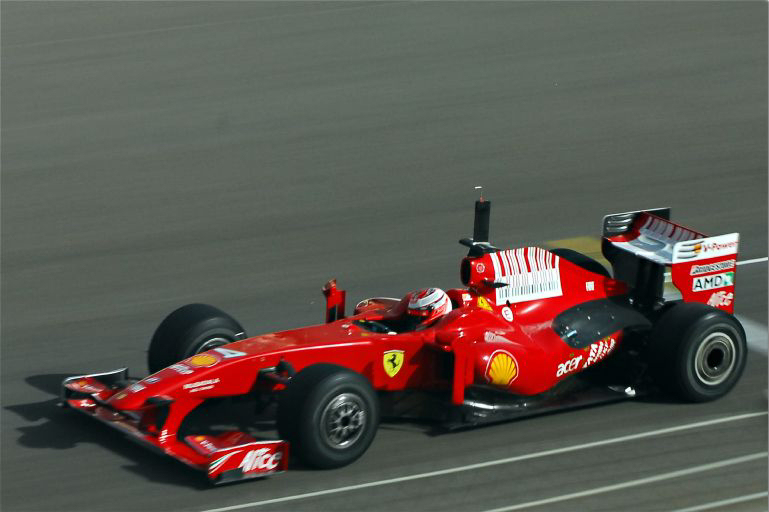
Räikkönen tests the F60, Ferrari's 2009 challenger.

At the start of the 2009 season in the Australian Grand Prix, Räikkönen qualified in ninth place. The pace of the Ferraris and McLarens in particular was significantly slower than the likes of the Brawn, Red Bull and other outfits who were struggling to keep up with them in 2008. In the race, both Ferraris were running well before Räikkönen hit a barrier. He was forced to make an unscheduled pit stop on lap 43 and subsequently retired with differential failure.

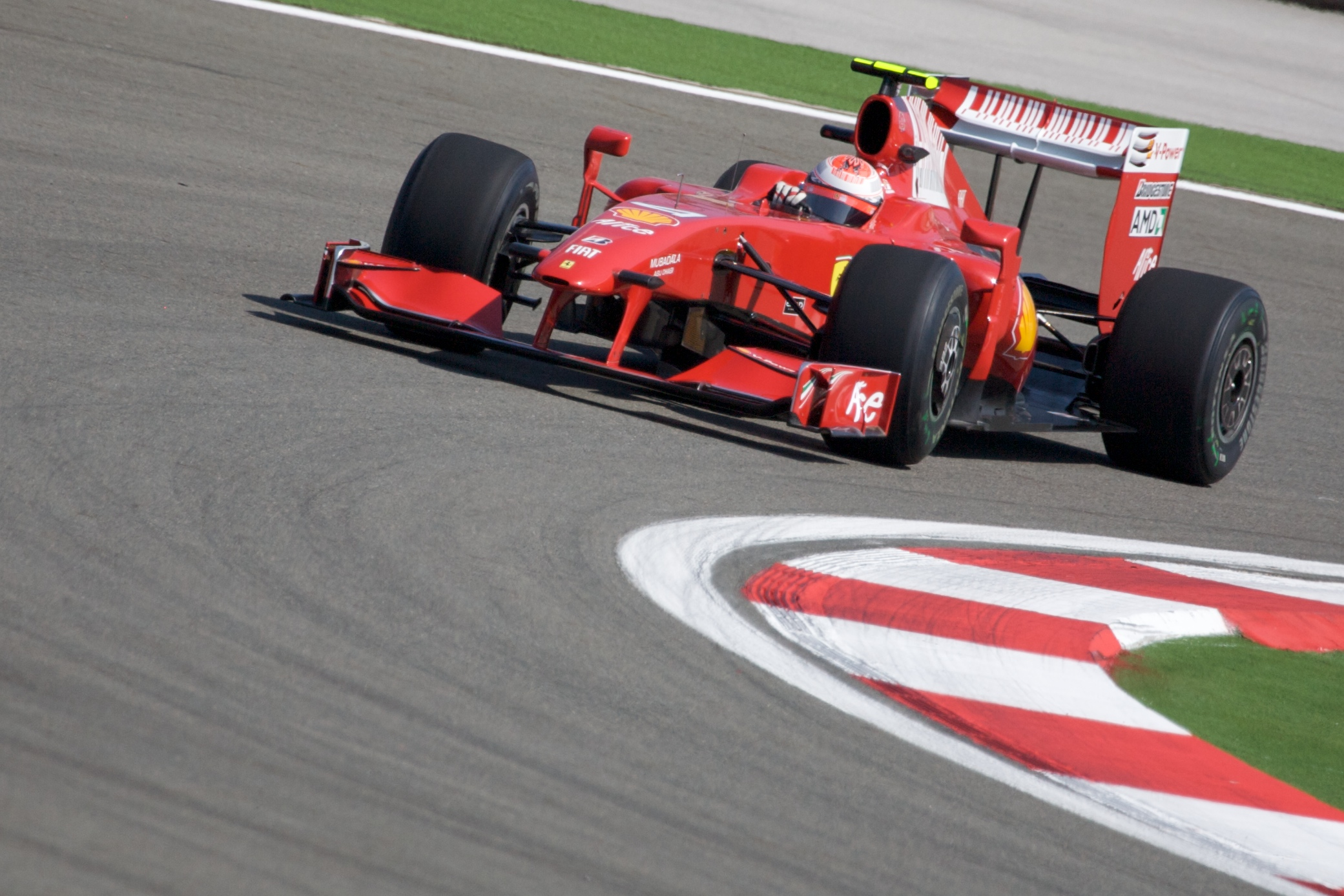
Räikkönen at the 2009 Turkish Grand Prix

In Malaysia, Räikkönen topped the time sheet in the second practice session. Räikkönen was ninth in qualifying. Sebastian Vettel and Rubens Barrichello's ten and five-place penalties respectively meant that he was promoted to seventh. During the race, rain was predicted and the team took a gamble to change Räikkönen to full wet tyres while the track was still dry. The gamble did not pay off, and Räikkönen fell down the field. By the time the race was stopped on the 33rd lap due to torrential rain, Räikkönen was classified 14th.

Räikkönen's season did not get any better in Round 3 in China where he qualified in eighth place. In the wet race, he and Lewis Hamilton had duels early on, with Hamilton having to overtake Räikkönen three times to get the job done. Räikkönen complained about power loss from the engine from near the start and of a lack of grip after his one and only pit-stop. This meant that he could only finish 10th. In Bahrain, Räikkönen secured sixth place and Ferrari's first points of the year, but was disappointed by the team's performance. He retired from the Spanish Grand Prix due to a hydraulics failure after qualifying from the back of the grid.

At the Monaco Grand Prix, Räikkönen secured second place in qualifying, Ferrari and Räikkönen's best qualifying of the year so far. He admitted that he was still disappointed because he missed out on pole narrowly to the Brawn of Jenson Button. Räikkönen lost out to Rubens Barrichello at the start of the race, dropping back to third. He maintained this position until the chequered flag.

At the Turkish Grand Prix, Räikkönen qualified sixth, but damaged his front wing on the first lap. He could only finish ninth, out of the points. At the British Grand Prix, Räikkönen qualified ninth but a good start saw him move up to fifth. However, he dropped to eighth during the pit stops because of traffic and remained until the finish.

At the German Grand Prix, Räikkönen qualified ninth after a damp session. In the race however he collided with the Force India of Adrian Sutil like in the previous year in Monte Carlo, as the German was emerging from a pitstop. While Sutil managed to recover back to the pits to replace a nosecone, Räikkönen was forced to retire a few laps later with radiator damage as a result of the incident.

At the Hungarian Grand Prix, Räikkönen took his and Ferrari's best finish of the season in second, after making a great start from seventh. After the first corner Räikkönen was in fourth place, but when Fernando Alonso retired after his early first stop, Räikkönen moved up to third. Räikkönen overtook Webber for second place at the first round of pit stops when Räikkönen and Webber pitted on the same lap. Räikkönen had a clean pit-stop, whereas Webber had a problem and was released into the path of the Ferrari. Räikkönen and Webber avoided collision, and Webber had to slot in behind Räikkönen. On his second pit stop, Räikkönen had a problem with an exhaust pipe. However, having built quite a gap between him and Webber, he held on to take second place.

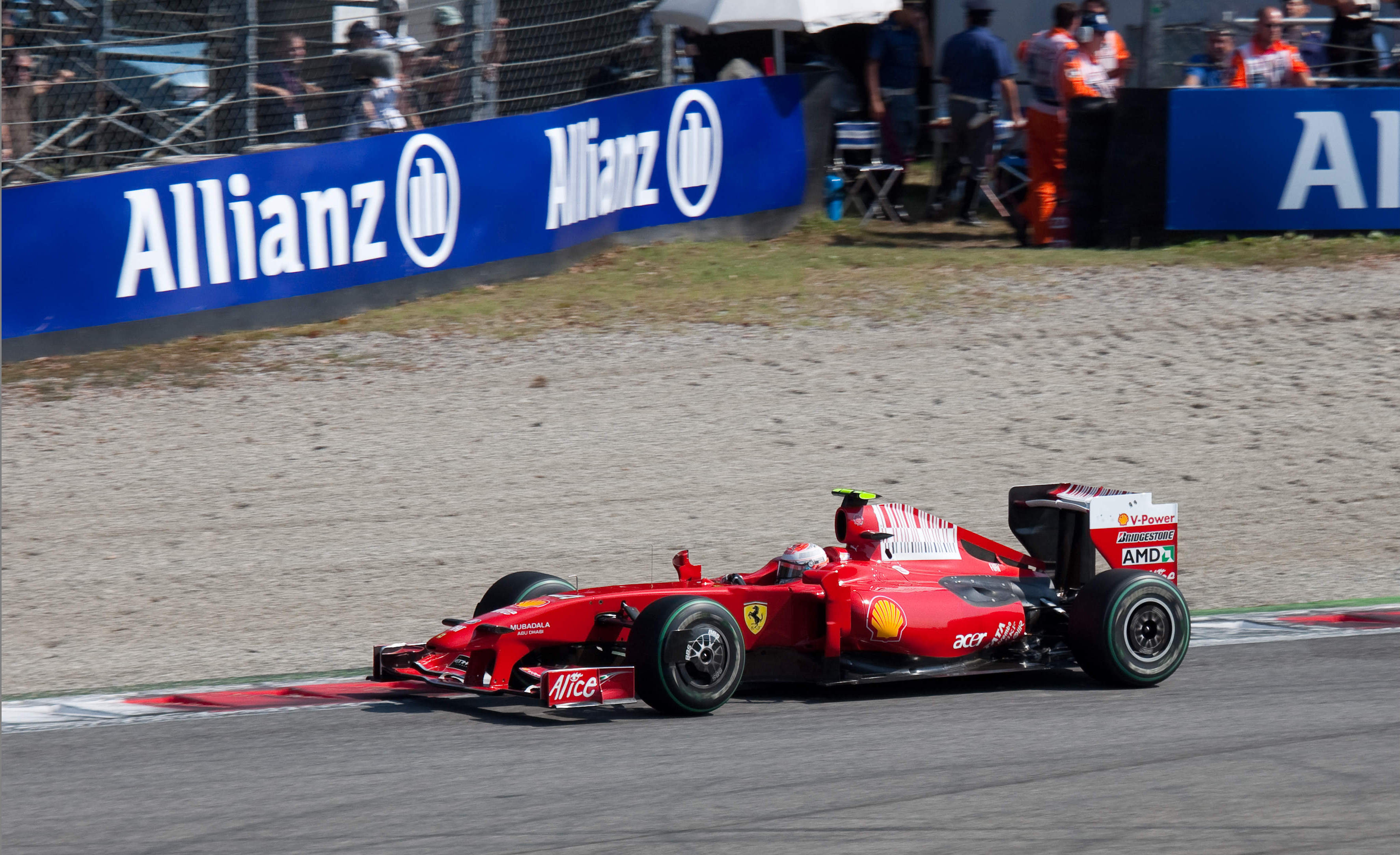
Räikkönen at the 2009 Italian Grand Prix

At the European Grand Prix, Räikkönen qualified sixth. He jumped to fourth at the start of the race. He then moved up to third after the second pit stops jumping Heikki Kovalainen for the last podium place, and stayed in that position until the end of the race, claiming his second straight podium.

At the Belgian Grand Prix, Räikkönen qualified sixth, jumping to second at the start of the race. After the safety car was removed, he passed Giancarlo Fisichella to take the race lead and led all the way to the chequered flag for his first race win in 25 races, and the first and only one for Ferrari in 2009. It was Räikkönen's fourth victory in the last five Belgian Grands Prix, bolstering his reputation as "The King of Spa".

Räikkönen continued his good form at the Italian Grand Prix, qualifying and finishing third, after Hamilton's last-lap crash. It was his fourth consecutive podium finish.

Singapore saw the end of a great run for Räikkönen where he only finished 10th after qualifying 12th.

In Japan, Räikkönen came very close to another podium, finishing fourth. He had qualified fifth and was not able to gain a place at the start of the race, as he was on hard tyres. He put on softs for his second stint and was able to close in on Nick Heidfeld at about three-quarters of a second every lap. He overtook the German after the BMW Sauber came out of the pits. However, an accident involving Toro Rosso's Jaime Alguersuari brought out the safety car on lap 44, which kept the field stationary for a further five laps. Despite Hamilton suffering a KERS failure, Räikkönen's car did not have the grip necessary and was not able to overtake the third-placed McLaren at the restart. He went wide in an attempt to overtake Hamilton but recovered without losing a further place to Nico Rosberg.

In Brazil, Räikkönen qualified fifth and finished sixth. His race was already ruined when Mark Webber swerved into his path, damaging the Ferrari's front wing. At the pit stop while having the wing changed, fuel dripping from the fuel rig stuck on Kovalainen's car caused the Ferrari to briefly burst in flames as the two cars were exiting their pit stops. For the rest of the race even with his eyes burning from fuel, Räikkönen used his strategy to move up the order and eventually finished in sixth place.

In Abu Dhabi, the last race of the season, Räikkönen qualified 11th. He lost a place at the start of the race to Kamui Kobayashi. Räikkönen finished 12th, out of the points.

=== First departure (2010–2011) ===
Near the end of the 2009 season, Ferrari announced that Räikkönen would be leaving the team, despite having a contract to race for them in 2010. He would be replaced by Fernando Alonso. He was expected to return to McLaren alongside Lewis Hamilton but negotiations with the team failed. Räikkönen was then linked to Mercedes GP but the team eventually signed Michael Schumacher and Nico Rosberg. Toyota F1, before it pulled out of Formula One, offered Räikkönen a driving contract to replace Timo Glock in 2010. The BBC reported that he refused the contract owing to wanting to drive a race-winning car, not to mention Toyota not offering a large enough salary.

On 17 November 2009, his manager Steve Robertson confirmed that Räikkönen would not drive in Formula One in the 2010 season. But during 2010 itself, rumours emerged once again about another possible Räikkönen comeback this time with the Renault team in 2011. This followed a resurgence in Renault's form, and the fact that the Russian Vitaly Petrov had yet to be re-signed like team-mate Robert Kubica. Team principal Éric Boullier claimed he had been contacted by Räikkönen in connection with a possible return, but said that although he was flattered by Räikkönen's alleged display of interest:

"I would have to speak personally with him first, look him in the eyes to see if I see enough motivation there for him to return to F1. It doesn't make sense to hire somebody, even a former world champion, if you cannot be sure that his motivation is still 100%. Why should you invest in somebody who leaves you guessing?"

However, Räikkönen angrily shot down the suggestion that he would race, claiming that Renault had simply used his name for "their own marketing purposes".

=== Lotus (2012–2013) ===
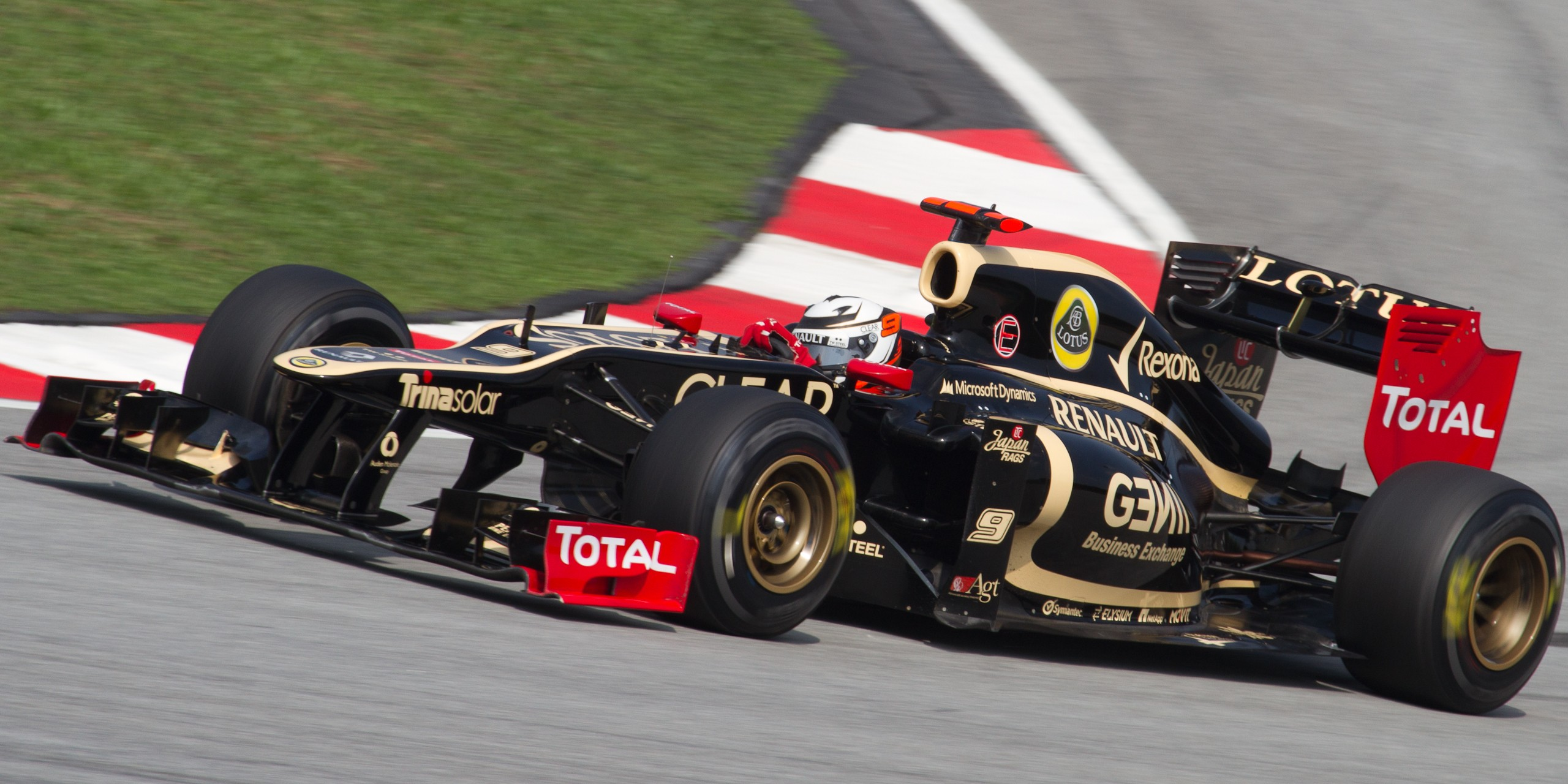
Räikkönen driving for Lotus at the 2012 Malaysian Grand Prix

In the week before the 2011 Singapore Grand Prix, several news sources reported that Räikkönen was eyeing a return to Formula One for 2012 with Williams, after he was spotted at the team's headquarters in Grove, Oxfordshire. On 29 November 2011, it was announced that Räikkönen would be returning to Formula 1 in 2012, signing a two-year contract with Lotus.

==== 2012 ====
Räikkönen began the season by qualifying 17th for the Australian Grand Prix after making a mistake on his last flying lap. However, he recovered his weekend during the race the next day, as he made a good start to move up to twelfth, before making it into the top ten. He took three places on the last lap of the race, to finish in seventh place.

In the dry qualifying session for the Malaysian Grand Prix, Räikkönen qualified in fifth place. He started the race from 10th place because of an unscheduled gearbox change. In the race he had the opportunity to try Pirelli's wet-weather tyres for the first time. He finished the race in fifth despite being inexperienced with Pirelli's wet-weather tyres compared to most of the other drivers.

At the Chinese Grand Prix, Räikkönen was 14th after running second before being overtaken by 10 cars in the space of one lap, due to a mistake in tyre strategy, expecting the Pirelli tyres to last longer in the last stint. At the Bahrain Grand Prix he finished second starting from 11th position on the grid. It was his first podium and his best finish of this comeback. Three weeks later, Räikkönen finished third at the Spanish Grand Prix, after having qualified in fifth place, which had been promoted to fourth as a result of a penalty given to Lewis Hamilton.

In the Monaco Grand Prix, Räikkönen qualified in eighth but finished one place lower in ninth place. For the Canadian Grand Prix Räikkönen again had a bad qualifying session finishing 12th. He was able to finish eighth in the race taking, as he stated, "important championship points". In the European Grand Prix at the Valencia Street Circuit he finished second behind Fernando Alonso. In the British Grand Prix he finished fifth, after having qualified in sixth place.

During qualifying for the German Grand Prix, Räikkönen had good pace in Q1 with the harder set of tyres and was looking good for a potential shot at a higher grid place. At the start of Q2 the rain was already heavy meaning that Räikkönen lost the advantage he had in dry conditions. In the wet Q3 session he qualified in 10th place. Good pace in dry conditions from the qualifying session was proven in the race as Räikkönen succeeded to finish fourth, and eventually gaining the last podium spot after Sebastian Vettel was penalised for an illegal overtaking manoeuvre.

For the Hungarian Grand Prix, Räikkönen qualified fifth. He lost fifth place at the start to Alonso due to a KERS issue on his E20 car. He succeeded in gaining a position over Alonso during the first round of pit-stops, and later did the same to Button and Vettel during the second round. He finished the race in second place, just one second behind the race winner Hamilton.

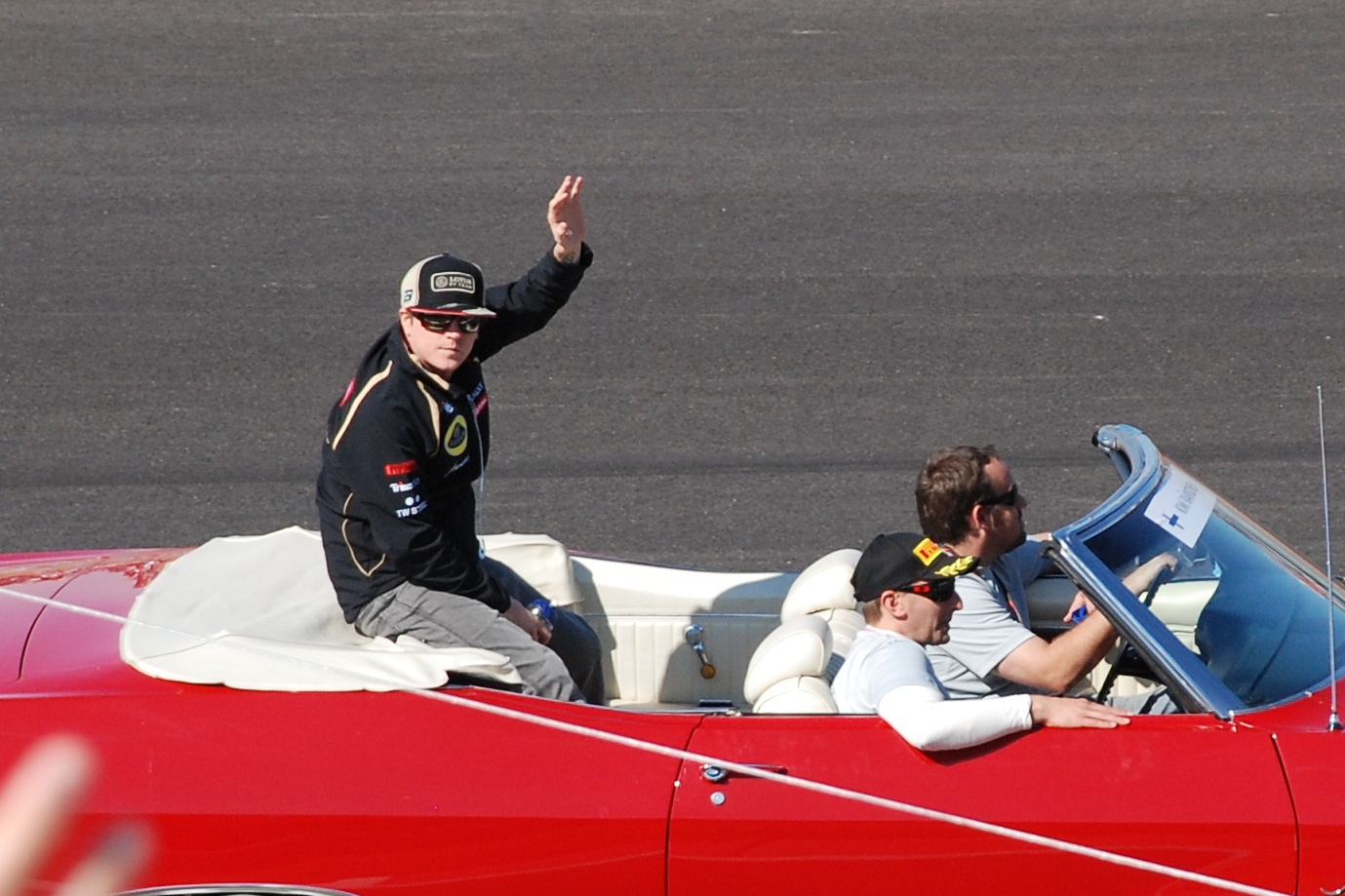
Räikkönen at the 2012 United States Grand Prix

After a five-week long summer break, the much speculated introduction of a 'Drag Reduction Device' by the Lotus F1 team was delayed due to bad weather conditions on Friday for the Belgian Grand Prix. That did not stop Räikkönen from qualifying fourth. He went on to finish third behind Jenson Button and Sebastian Vettel. A week later at Italian Grand Prix at Monza, Räikkönen qualified seventh and finished the race in fifth.

At the Singapore Grand Prix, Räikkönen qualified 12th as his Lotus E20 could not match the pace of the top three teams and eventually finished sixth. At the Japanese Grand Prix, Räikkönen qualified eighth after spinning at his final attempt in Q3 and finished sixth after being passed by McLaren's Lewis Hamilton after the second round of pit stops.

The Korean Grand Prix saw the introduction of a coanda style exhaust system and several other minor updates to the Lotus E20 which, Lotus team boss Éric Boullier regarded as a new era in his team's development race. Räikkönen eventually qualified fifth and finished the race in fifth after an impressive battle with Hamilton which ended in Räikkönen's favour. Even though he was 48 points behind the championship leader Vettel after 16 rounds of the 2012 season, Räikkönen said he took inspiration from the 2007 season which he won at the last round in Brazilian Grand Prix after Lewis Hamilton suffered gearbox problems.

At the Indian Grand Prix, Räikkönen qualified in seventh place. He could not manage to improve his starting position because of a lack of top speed on the straights. After this race, the contract with Lotus was extended for 2013 due to the fact that the terms of options in the contract have been met.

On 4 November 2012, Räikkönen won his first race for the Lotus F1 team at the Abu Dhabi Grand Prix after a good start from fourth saw him take Pastor Maldonado and Mark Webber at the first corner. He was unable to match the pace of Hamilton, but a mechanical issue retired the McLaren and allowed Räikkönen to win the race, despite pressure from the Ferrari of Alonso in the closing stages. Although he was now mathematically eliminated from the championship as a result of Vettel finishing third, the Lotus name celebrated its first win since the 1987 Detroit Grand Prix which was won by Ayrton Senna. At the concluding race of 2012, Räikkönen needed to finish fifth to guarantee third place in the championship, ahead of Hamilton. He qualified only ninth. On lap 52, Räikkönen, who had been in-and-out of the points frequently, made a mistake and went off the track and tried to use an escape road to re-enter the track rather than drive over the grass. The road was blocked and he was forced to turn back. He lost numerous places and found himself behind a Caterham and a Marussia. He skidded again to be lapped, but re-claimed the lost places and with a retirement from Hamilton, finished the race in 10th and claimed his third place in the standings, with a single point contribution to the tally. He ended the season 71 points behind Alonso and 74 points behind champion Vettel.

==== 2013 ====
On 29 October 2012, Lotus confirmed that Räikkönen would be racing with the team in 2013, after several weeks of speculation that Räikkönen had several other options for 2013, including other forms of motorsport.

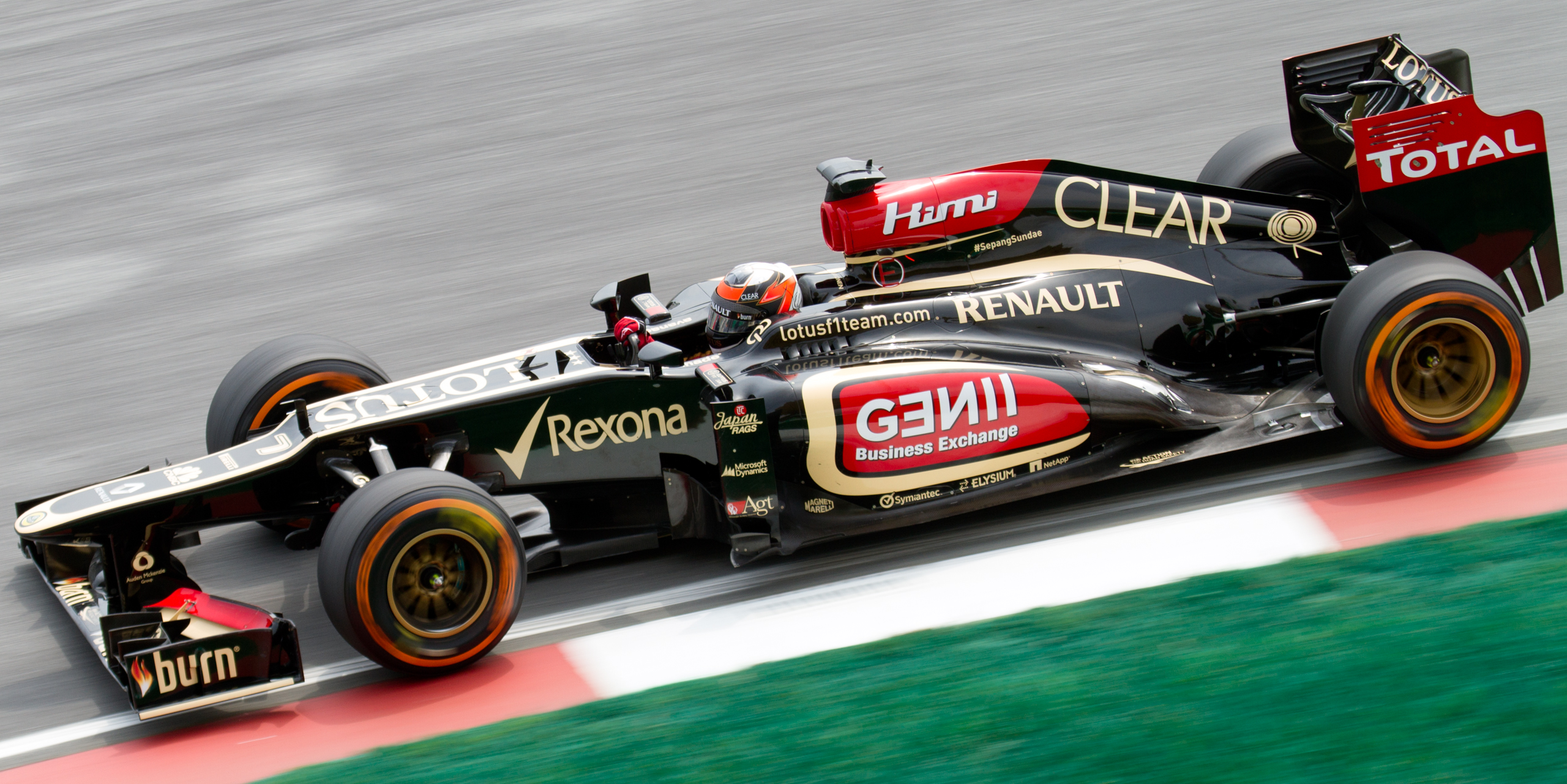
Räikkönen at the 2013 Malaysian Grand Prix

On 17 March 2013, Räikkönen won the first race of the season, the Australian Grand Prix despite starting from seventh, thanks to a two-stop strategy while most of the others did three stops. He also set the fastest lap of the race on lap 56. He described the victory as one of his easiest wins. Räikkönen qualified seventh in Malaysia, but was demoted three places for impeding Nico Rosberg during qualifying. He finished the race seventh, behind team-mate Grosjean, after damaging his car at the start.

At the Chinese Grand Prix, Räikkönen qualified and finished second, despite having to regain the two places he lost at the start and having damaged the front of his car while battling Sergio Pérez for position. In the Bahrain Grand Prix he qualified ninth, but was promoted to eighth after Lewis Hamilton received a five-place grid penalty for an unscheduled gearbox change. He finished the race second ahead of his team-mate Romain Grosjean, with Sebastian Vettel winning the race. The podium of the race was exactly same as in 2012. At the Spanish Grand Prix, Räikkönen started fourth and finished second thanks to a three-stop strategy. At the next race in Monaco, Räikkönen started fifth but an aggressive overtake by Pérez gave him a puncture and dropped him out of the points until a last-ditch attempt on the final lap where he overtook Esteban Gutiérrez, Valtteri Bottas and Nico Hülkenberg to gain 10th place. In the process, it continued his streak of 23 consecutive points finishes, one shy of the record of 24 set by Michael Schumacher across three seasons between 2001 and 2003.

With his Lotus struggling during the Canadian Grand Prix, Räikkönen finished ninth. On 30 June 2013 at the British Grand Prix, Räikkönen finished in the points for the 25th consecutive race, breaking Schumacher's record. He finished fifth but believed second place could have been possible had he pitted during the safety car period. The result kept him in third place in the championship. At the German Grand Prix, Räikkönen qualified fourth and finished second, only a second behind Vettel with the help of the safety car. Räikkönen struggled in qualifying for the Hungarian Grand Prix, unable to capitalise on strong times earlier in the weekend. He qualified sixth but finished second – for the fifth time at the circuit – holding off a last minute charge from Vettel with fresher tyres. The result promoted him to second in the Drivers' Championship, one point ahead of Fernando Alonso and 38 points behind championship leader, Vettel.

At the Belgian Grand Prix, Räikkönen finished fastest in Q2 but struggled during the wetter final session, qualifying eighth behind his teammate. Although Räikkönen did gain some places in the race, he was eventually forced to retire with a brake related issue on lap 27, ending the Finn's record-breaking run – also numbering 27 – of consecutive points finishes. The DNF also ended his chances of beating the most consecutive race finishes – a record held by Nick Heidfeld at 41 finishes – Räikkönen recorded 38.

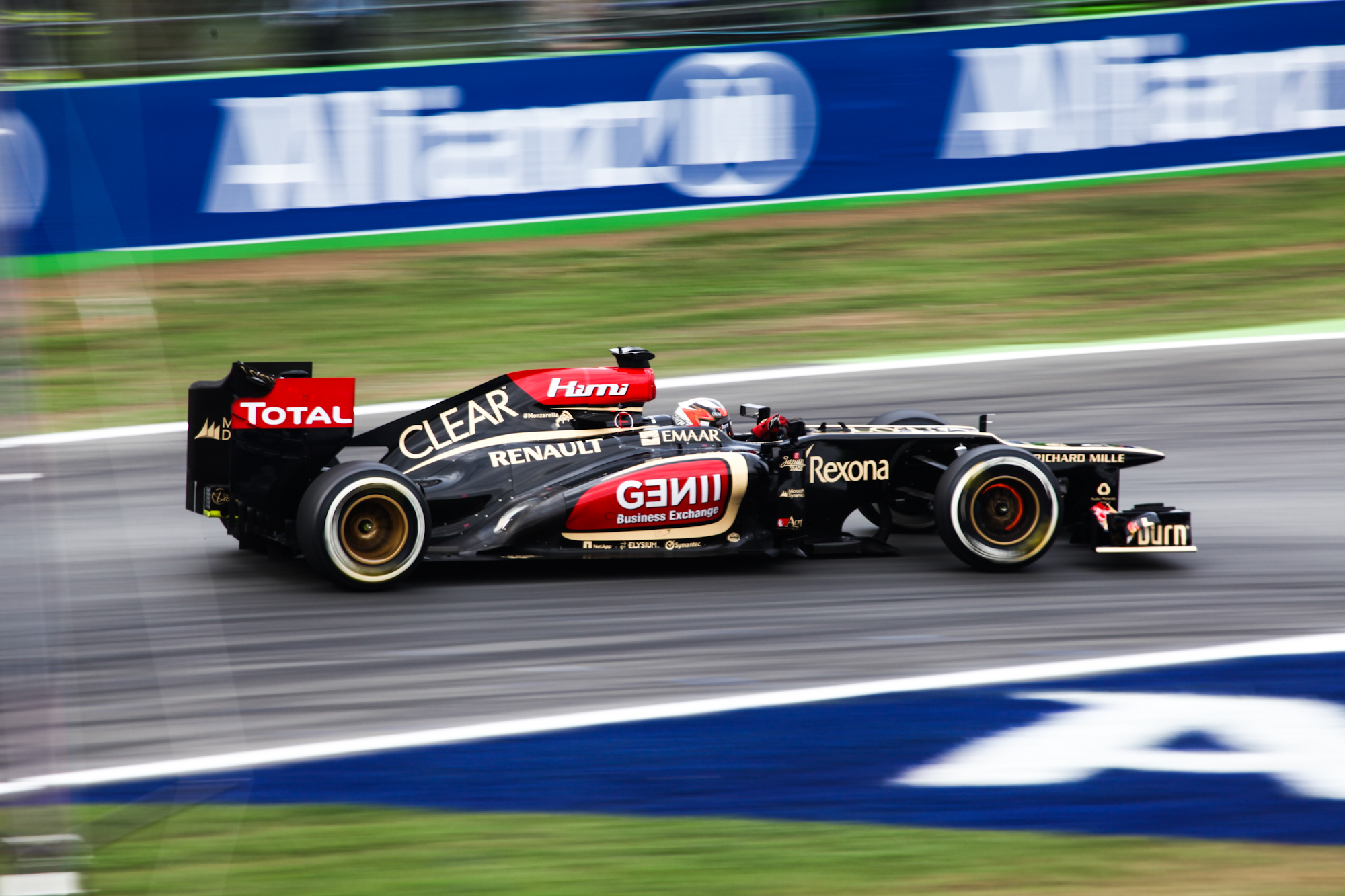
Räikkönen at the 2013 Italian Grand Prix

Räikkönen failed to score again at the Italian Grand Prix after losing his front wing at the start. He managed to make his way up the order, but was unable to pass Jenson Button for a point scoring position. On the week following the race, it was announced that Räikkönen would not continue with Lotus for the 2014 season, and instead join Fernando Alonso at Ferrari. Before the following Singapore Grand Prix, it was revealed that Räikkönen had not been paid salary by Lotus for the whole season, meaning there were several million euros of outstanding fees. Räikkönen publicly cited this as the reason for leaving Lotus for Ferrari.

In the Singapore Grand Prix, Räikkönen had recurring back problems during the practice sessions, which at first put his participation in the race in question. He qualified only 13th, but was still able to return to the podium, clawing to the third place partly thanks to a safety car intervention in the middle of the race. At the Japanese Grand Prix, he qualified ninth and finished fifth.

Two weeks later, at the Indian Grand Prix, Räikkönen qualified sixth. In the race, he opted for a one-stop tyre strategy, placing him in the second place at the closing stages of the Grand Prix. However, during the final few laps, his pace was more than a second slower than those chasing him, including Nico Rosberg and Räikkönen's Lotus teammate Romain Grosjean. With eight laps remaining, Rosberg was able to take over Räikkönen for second. Grosjean then caught up with Räikkönen on the fourth last lap, but was not immediately able to pass him. At this point, the Lotus trackside operations director Alan Permane had a heated radio exchange with Räikkönen, commanding him to move out of the way. The radio conversation was widely noted in the press, raising questions about the health of his relationship with the team. Räikkönen eventually finished seventh after stopping for new tyres with only two laps to go.

In the following Abu Dhabi Grand Prix, questions about Räikkönen's relationship with his team were further fuelled by his absence from the usual Thursday media events. Räikkönen had reportedly only left his home at the last moment to make it to the Grand Prix after considering not racing at all in the event. On Friday, Räikkönen then publicly threatened that he would not continue to race with Lotus in the remaining two Grands Prix of the season after Abu Dhabi unless the salary dispute was resolved. In the Saturday's qualifying, Räikkönen made it to fifth, but was demoted to the 22nd and last grid spot due to his E21 car failing a post-qualifying floor deflection test. In the race, he immediately made contact with Giedo van der Garde's Caterham in the first corner of the first lap and broke his Lotus's right front suspension, forcing Räikkönen to retire on the first lap for the first time since the 2006 United States Grand Prix. Immediately after being recovered, he left the circuit and returned to his hotel while the race continued, further fuelling tensions between him and the team. Despite this, following the race, it was announced that Lotus and Räikkönen had reached a provisional agreement on the salary dispute that would see Räikkönen race for the team during the remainder of the season as the investment group Quantum Motorsports said that they had concluded long-running negotiations with Lotus for acquisition of a share in the team, providing the team with financial security.

However, a week before the following United States Grand Prix, it was announced that Räikkönen would nevertheless miss the rest of the season, having elected to have back surgery for the problems that had troubled him in the Singapore Grand Prix. For the remaining two Grands Prix, Räikkönen would be replaced at Lotus by fellow Finn Heikki Kovalainen.

=== Return to Ferrari (2014–2018) ===
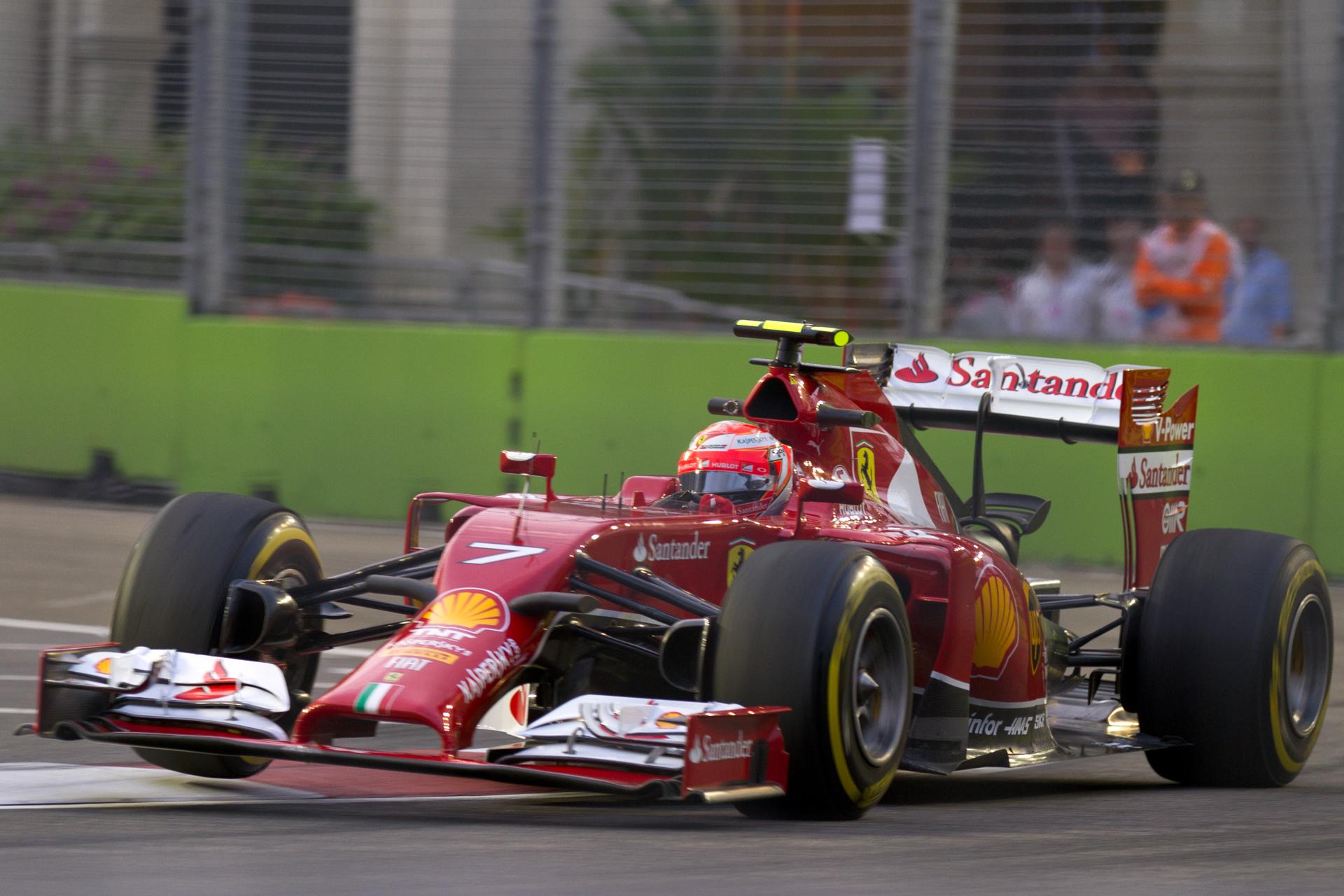
Räikkönen at the 2014 Singapore Grand Prix

On 11 September 2013, it was confirmed that Räikkönen had agreed a two-year deal to return to Ferrari (where he won the championship in 2007), starting from 2014. He revealed that it was for monetary reasons that he left Lotus.

==== 2014 ====
Räikkönen was on for a podium finish at the Monaco Grand Prix. However, Max Chilton punctured Räikkönen's left-rear tyre while unlapping himself, forcing Räikkönen to make a second pitstop. Räikkönen then set the fastest lap of the race on lap 75, but finished 12th.

After a mostly disappointing first half of the season, Räikkönen had a return to form at the first race back after the summer break in Belgium, where a good strategy and a series of fastest laps earned him fourth place, his best result of the season. It was also the first time Räikkönen had finished higher in a race than Alonso in 2014. Räikkönen ended the 2014 season a career-low 12th in the Drivers' Championship, and for the first time since his rookie year, did not finish on the podium. Throughout the season, Räikkönen struggled with the car's lack of turn-in on corner entry and the feeling of the new brake-by-wire systems, saying that "We try somehow to balance it out and try to have a front end on the car, but it is very, very difficult. I hate it when there is no front end on the car."

Räikkönen remained with Ferrari for the 2015 season, partnering former world champion Sebastian Vettel after Alonso announced his departure from the Scuderia.

==== 2015 ====
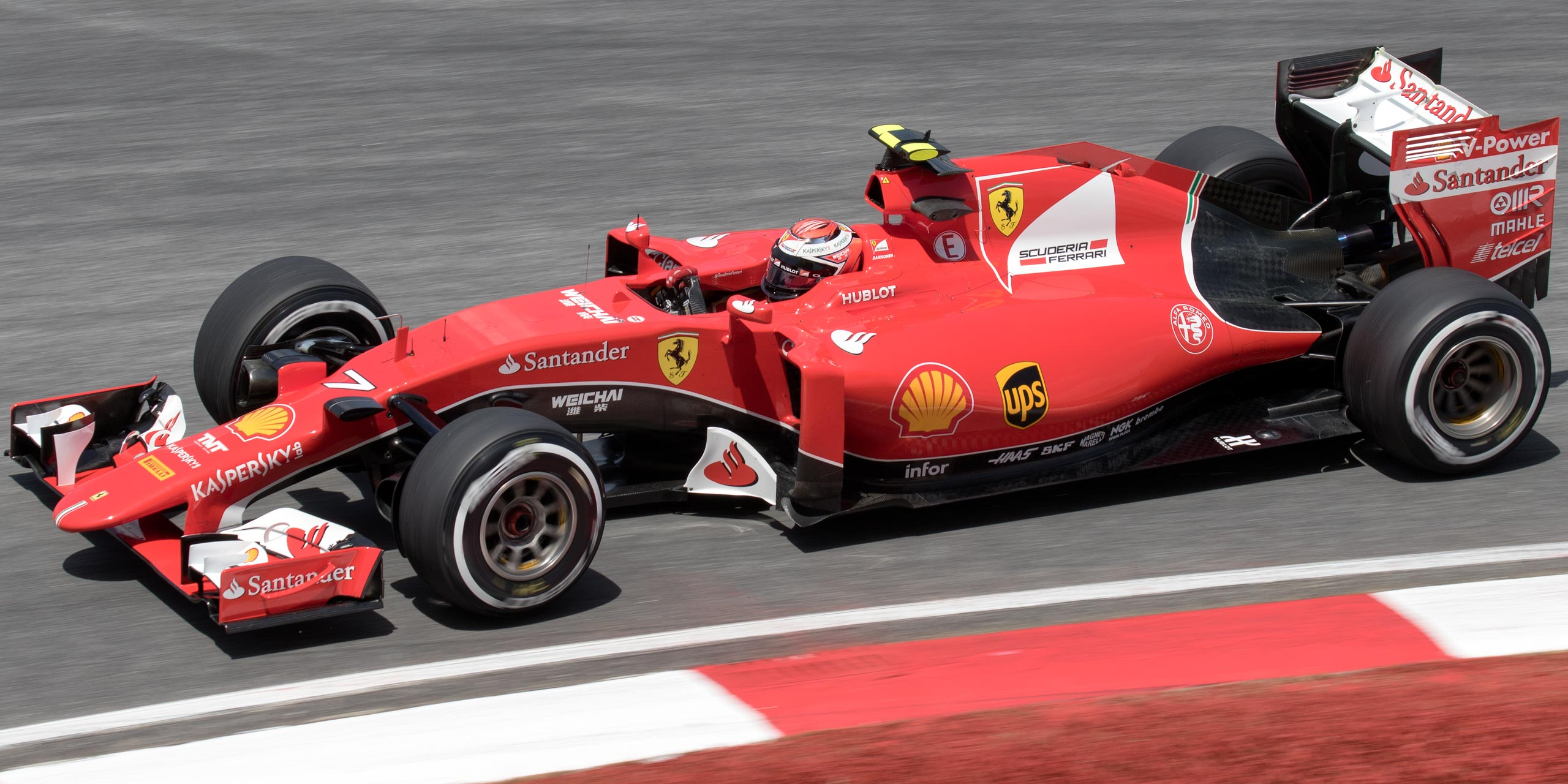
Räikkönen at the 2015 Malaysian Grand Prix

Räikkönen had to retire from the first race of the season in Australia due to a loose wheel following a pitstop. Following that mishap, he recovered to finish fourth both in Malaysia and China. Another pit issue befell Räikkönen during practice for the Bahrain Grand Prix as he was reprimanded for exiting the pitlane in a 'potentially dangerous manner' by the stewards, having swerved around a standing car in an undesignated area. However, he escaped a possible grid penalty. During the same weekend, his manager Steve Robertson suggested that Räikkönen was heading towards a contract extension with Ferrari. That would contradict previous suggestions from Räikkönen himself that he would 'probably' retire at the end of his Ferrari contract, and that 2015 would be his last season. Courtesy of a considerate tyre strategy by the Ferrari team, at the Bahrain Grand Prix, Räikkönen finished second after gaining that position late in the race and starting from fourth on the grid. In the process, Räikkönen recorded his first podium since the 2013 Korean Grand Prix for Lotus, and the first in his second spell with Ferrari – his most recent Ferrari podium was a third-place finish at the 2009 Italian Grand Prix. Räikkönen said that he was hopeful in winning races in the near future after the team's strong recovery relative to 2014. He also commented that, both the engine and downforce had been significantly improved and that the car handled much more to his liking. In a post-race interview, Ferrari team boss, Maurizio Arrivabene, described this result as a sign that Räikkönen "is back" and that he "showed what a race animal he is", also implying that if he had a few more race laps available, Räikkönen would have challenged Hamilton for the race win.

At the next race of the season in Barcelona, Räikkönen was unhappy with the setup of the car and was able to qualify only in seventh place. However, he had a good opening lap in the race and made up two places to finish the race in fifth position. Räikkönen termed Monaco GP qualifying session to be a "disaster"; he was only able to qualify in sixth position, with his teammate Vettel qualifying in third, followed by Daniel Ricciardo and Daniil Kvyat in the Red Bulls. In the race, Räikkönen was able to move up to fifth place, before being controversially overtaken by Ricciardo, and thus held his qualifying position to finish the race in sixth. Räikkönen put up a strong qualifying performance at Montreal to take third on the grid behind the two Mercedes drivers. During the race, while on the out-lap from a pitstop, Räikkönen suffered a repeat of the incident at the previous year's race and spun at the hairpin, which was attributed to an engine torque mapping issue. This caused him to lose his third place to Valtteri Bottas. In the Austrian Grand Prix he was involved in a big crash with Fernando Alonso which left Alonso's McLaren on top of Räikkönen's Ferrari. However both left unscathed. After a disappointing showing caused by changing weather in Great Britain, Räikkönen bounced back strongly running second behind Vettel looking set for a 1–2 in Hungary, when a technical failure regarding the energy recovery system meant he lost straightline speed. An untimely safety car meant losing further positions after the restart and after a pitstop to re-fire the engine meant he dropped out of the points he retired when the problem did not fix itself as he had lost the chance to get back past any cars.

On 19 August, Ferrari announced that Räikkönen had extended his contract with the team for the 2016 season, taking his total tally with the team to six seasons spread out over a total of ten years. Räikkönen said that 'his dream went on' and confirmed that he wanted Ferrari to be the team where he ended his career. At the race following the announcement (Spa), miscommunication from the team coupled with gearbox change penalties saw Räikkönen start from 17th on the grid. However, he managed to overtake the middle pack and finished the race in seventh, after Vettel had a tire blowout on the 42nd lap causing him to lose a third-place finish.

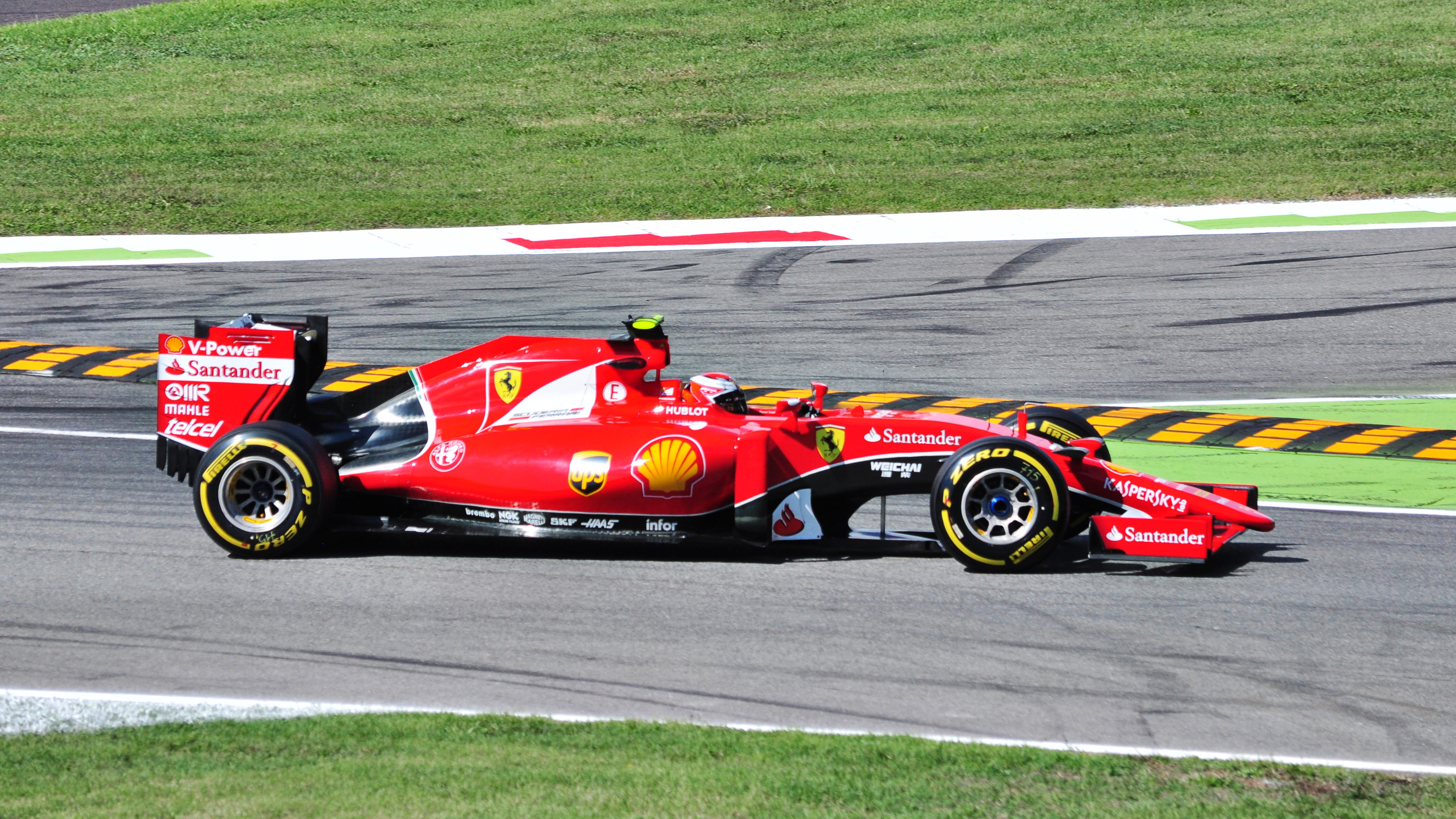
Räikkönen at the 2015 Italian Grand Prix

Räikkönen qualified on the front row for Ferrari's home race at Monza, but a complete lack of movement for a few seconds at the start saw him drop down the order. Showing good pace however, he managed to pick his way from the back of the field to fifth. Räikkönen blamed a 'clutch positioning' problem, while team boss Arrivabene suggested Räikkönen had caused the anti-stall to kick in himself due to 'messing with his fingers' although he clarified it saying he did not fully know at the time. Nevertheless, he remained at one podium of the season, as teammate Vettel finished second to take his tally to eight in twelve races.

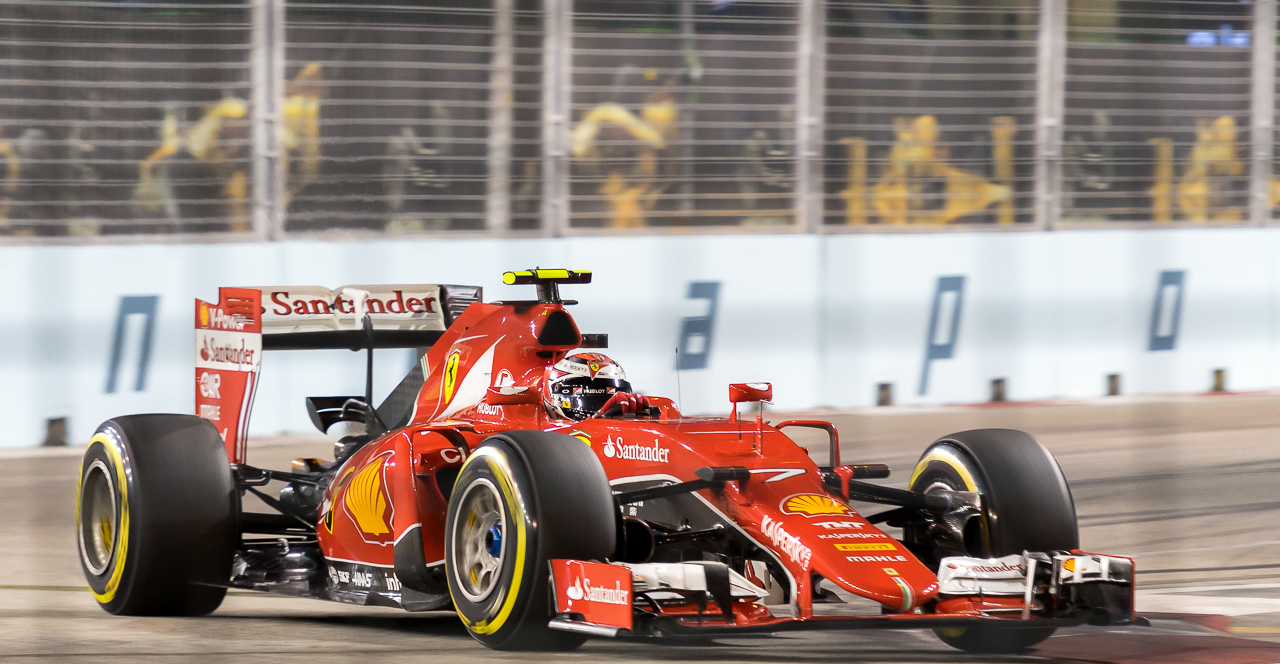
Räikkönen at the 2015 Singapore Grand Prix

At the Singapore Grand Prix, Räikkönen showed consistent performances in the practice sessions and qualified in third, behind Vettel and Daniel Ricciardo. Räikkönen maintained the position through the race despite being uncomfortable with the car, to take his second podium finish of the season. Räikkönen ended the season by finishing third in the season-ending Abu Dhabi Grand Prix to take his third podium of the year and securing fourth place in the Drivers' Championship.

==== 2016 ====
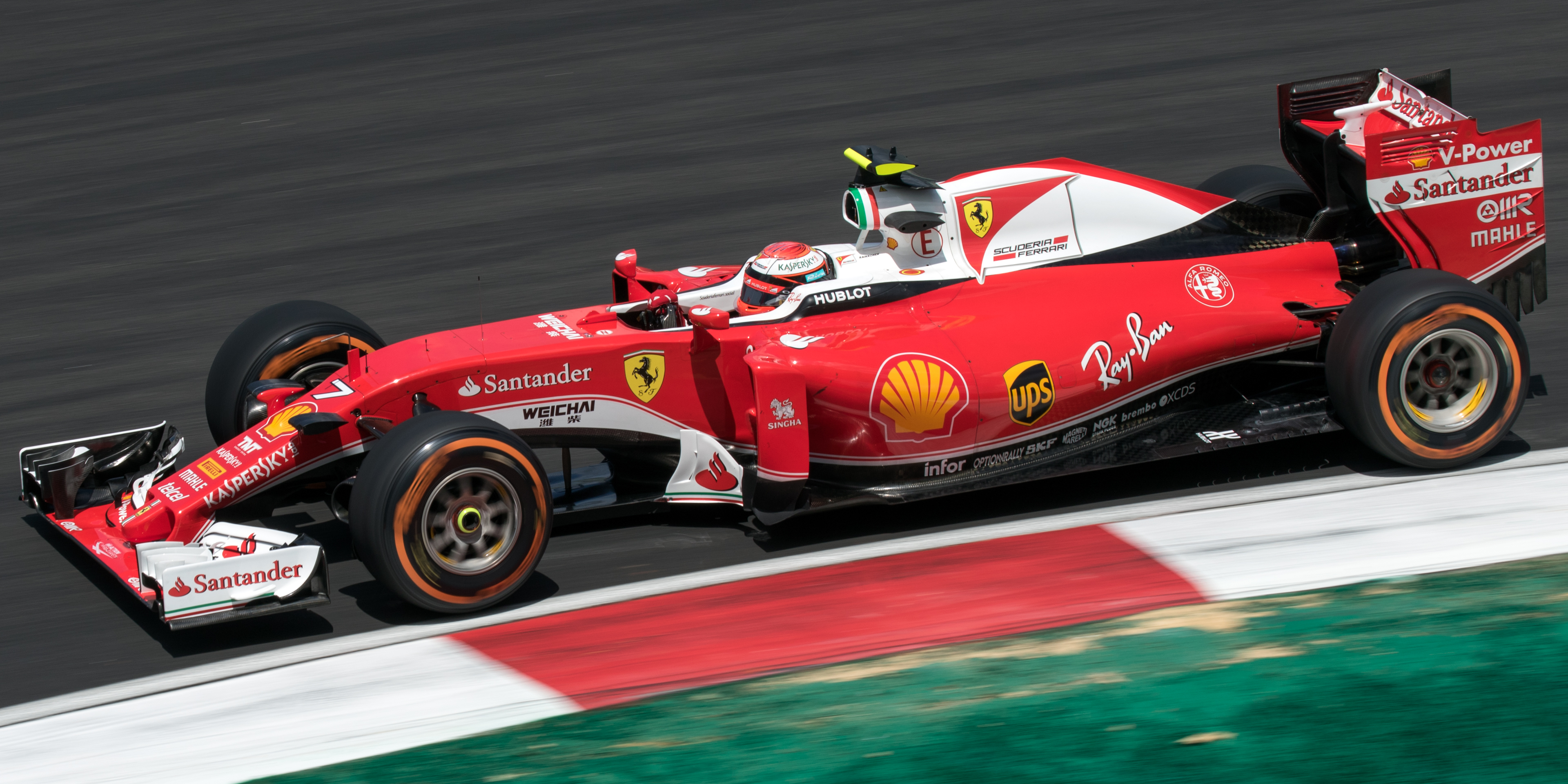
Räikkönen at the 2016 Malaysian Grand Prix

For the second year in a row, Räikkönen had to retire from the first race of the season in Australia, after a fire broke out in his airbox. Räikkönen finished in the second place at the Bahrain Grand Prix while his teammate Sebastian Vettel did not start the race after his car broke down on the formation lap. Räikkönen outpaced Vettel in qualifying at the Chinese Grand Prix to take third on the grid, however a first lap collision with Vettel saw him damaging his front wing and he dropped down the order, he then showed good pace to move up the field and eventually finished fifth. He managed to finish the Russian Grand Prix in third place after a huge start collision, which left his teammate Vettel out of the race. This was also the 700th podium in Ferrari's Formula One history. Räikkönen finished behind Max Verstappen in second place to take his third podium of the season in the Spanish Grand Prix finishing ahead of Vettel who was third.

Räikkönen showed greatly improved qualifying performances during the 2016 season, out-qualifying teammate Vettel 11–10.

==== 2017 ====
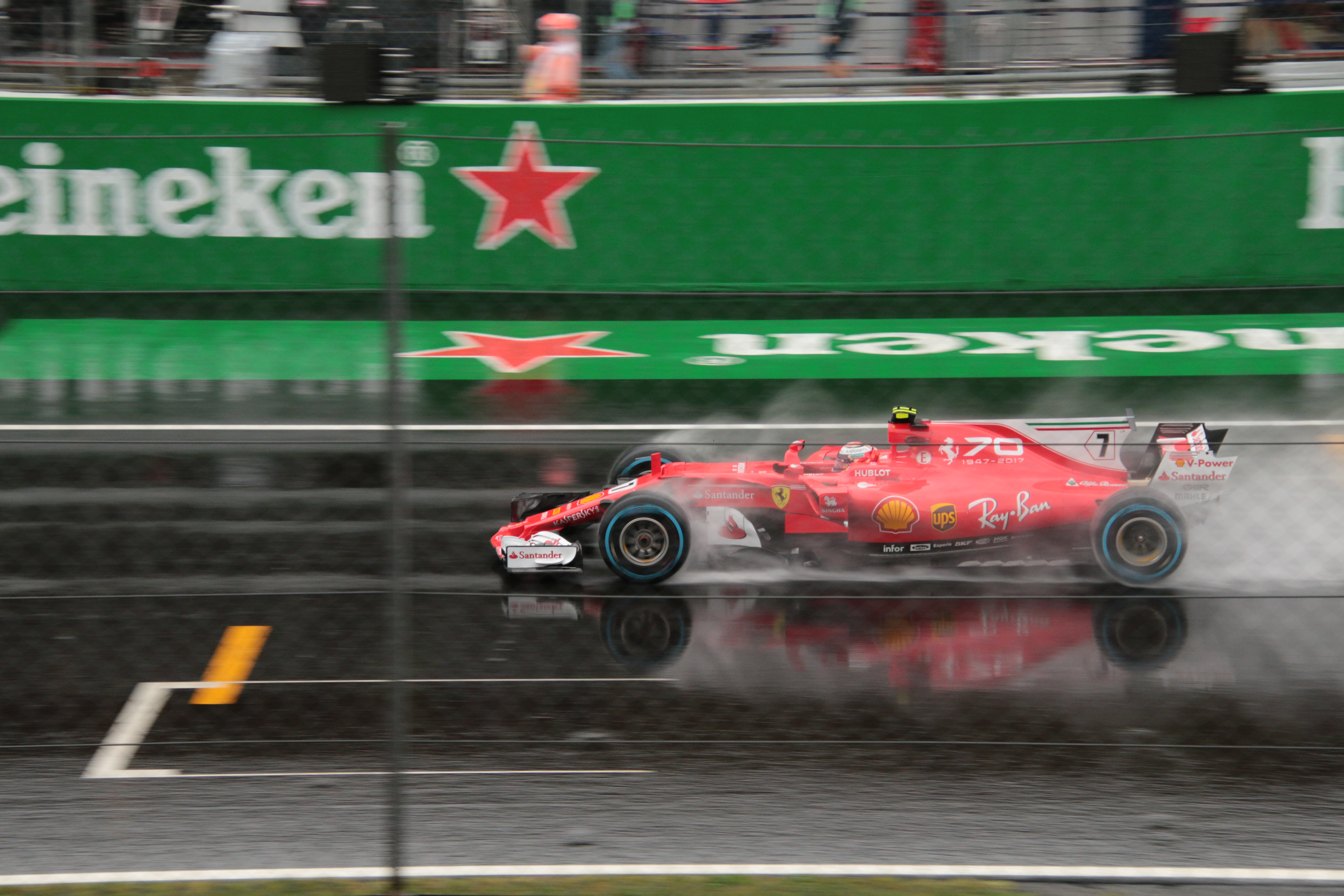
Räikkönen during qualifying at the 2017 Italian Grand Prix. His Ferrari SF70H is using the special 70th Scuderia Ferrari anniversary livery.

Räikkönen started the 2017 season with fourth in Australia, fifth in China and then again fourth in Bahrain. Räikkönen scored his first podium of the season at the following Russian Grand Prix, finishing third. He retired from the Spanish Grand Prix after being involved in an incident on the first lap.

Räikkönen scored his first pole position in 129 races at the Monaco Grand Prix, qualifying 0.04 seconds faster than teammate Sebastian Vettel to become the sport's oldest polesitter since 1997. He finished the race second after Vettel had a superior strategy, giving Ferrari their first 1–2 finish since 2010. Räikkönen finished seventh in Canada after struggling with brake problems. He qualified third at the Azerbaijan Grand Prix, but retired from the race with an oil leak. He then finished fifth in Austria.

Räikkönen qualified second at the British Grand Prix, but suffered a tyre failure late in the race while in second place, however he still managed to finish third, ahead of teammate Vettel. At the Hungarian Grand Prix, Räikkönen qualified second. In the race, after Vettel – who was in first position – made his pitstop first, Räikkönen was driving faster than him on older tyres, but Ferrari pitted Räikkönen early to defend Vettel from cars behind him, denying Räikkönen a chance of overcutting Vettel, eventually finishing second. He then finished fourth in Belgium and fifth in Italy. Räikkönen qualified fourth at the Singapore Grand Prix, but after getting a great start, was hit by Max Verstappen, who avoided Vettel's aggressive move across the circuit, which ultimately ended up in a crash that put all three drivers out of the race.

In Malaysia, Räikkönen qualified second but did not start the race because of a technical problem. After a fifth place at the Japanese Grand Prix, Räikkönen finished third at the United States Grand Prix. He repeated this performance in the Mexican Grand Prix and Brazilian Grand Prix, scoring three consecutive podiums. A fourth-place finish in Abu Dhabi secured fourth position in the drivers' championship for Räikkönen.

==== 2018 ====
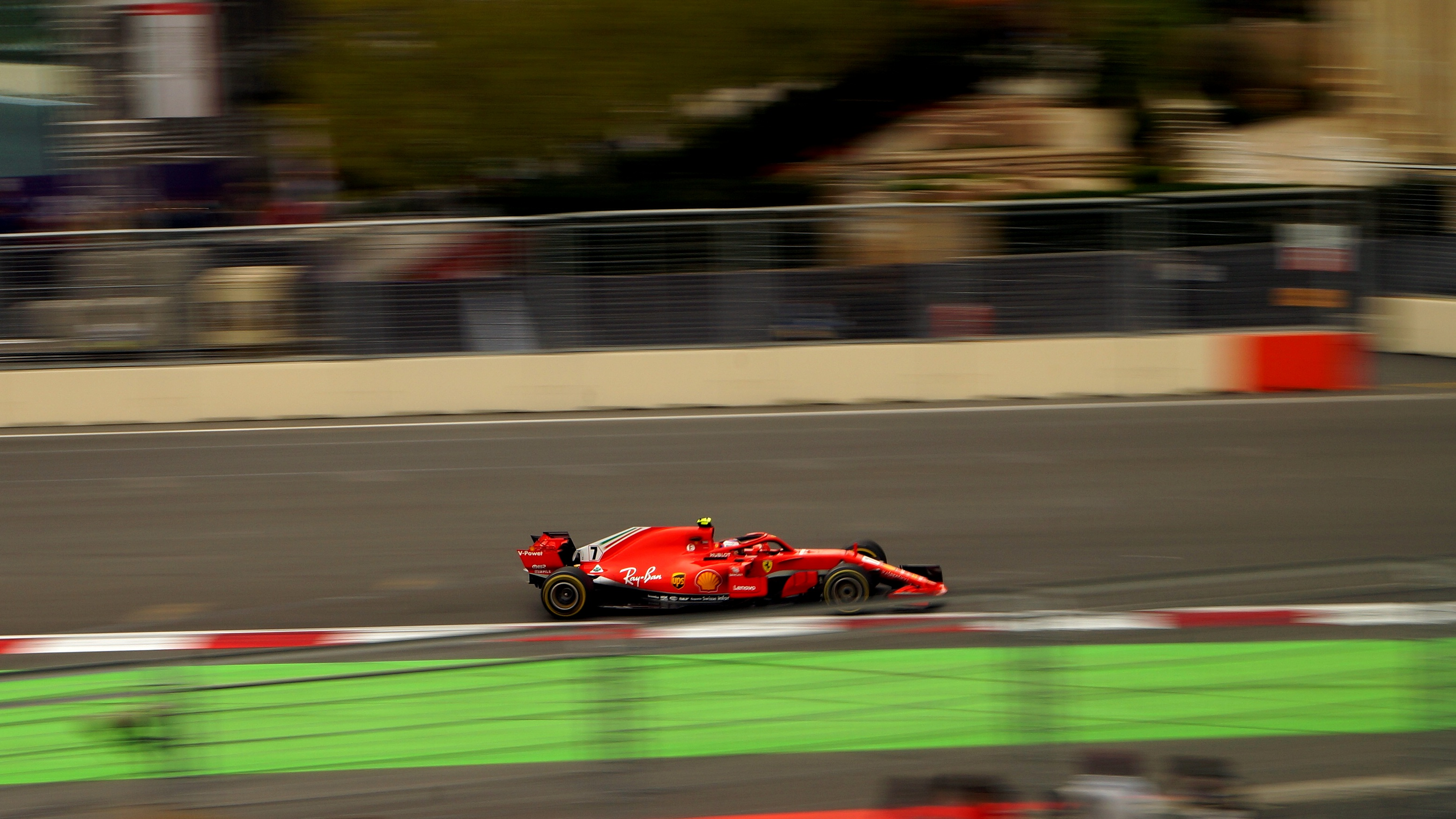
Kimi Räikkönen at the 2018 Azerbaijan Grand Prix

Räikkönen renewed his contract with Ferrari for the 2018 season on 22 August 2017. He qualified second for the first race in Australia and finished third, after being jumped by Vettel during the virtual safety car period. At the Bahrain Grand Prix, he qualified second after encountering traffic on his last run. He then ran in third for most of the race, but retired on lap 35 due to a pit stop error by Ferrari. He went on to finish third at the Chinese Grand Prix after recovering from a strategy aimed at helping his teammate.

At the Azerbaijan Grand Prix, Räikkönen recovered from a first lap incident with Esteban Ocon to eventually finish second. Räikkönen's engine failed during practice at the Spanish Grand Prix, forcing him to change engines. This meant that he missed Ferrari's upgraded engine introduced two races later in Canada and had to race with the old specification engine until the 13th round in Belgium to avoid a penalty. His engine failed again in the race in Spain, forcing him to retire from the race, but the engine did not have to be replaced. This was followed by a fourth-place finish in Monaco and sixth in Canada.

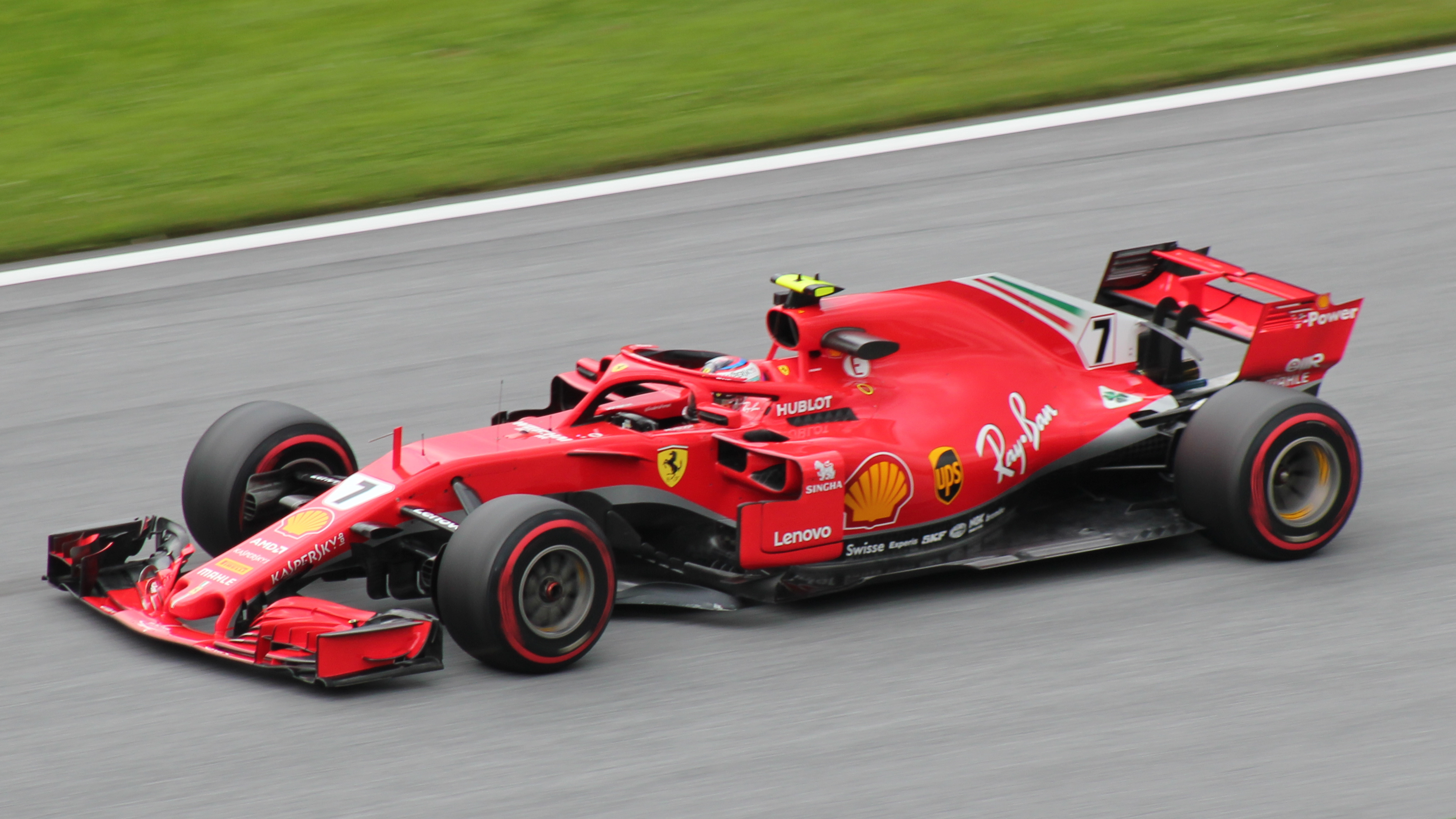
Räikkönen at the 2018 Austrian Grand Prix

A third-place finish in the French Grand Prix started a run of consecutive podiums for Räikkönen. He would finish second at the following Austrian Grand Prix, then at the British Grand Prix he recovered from a controversial 10-second penalty to finish third, after which he finished third again at the German and Hungarian Grands Prix to score five consecutive podiums. At the Belgian Grand Prix, Räikkönen had strong pace during qualifying, but a fuel miscalculation by Ferrari meant that he could not complete a lap in the drying conditions later in session which left him sixth on the grid. He retired from the race as his car was damaged in a first lap crash initiated by Nico Hülkenberg.

Räikkönen took pole position at the Italian Grand Prix, breaking Juan Pablo Montoya's 14-year-old record to set the fastest lap ever recorded in Formula One history with an average speed of 263.588 kilometres per hour (163.786 mph) and a laptime of 1:19.119. His race was compromised by Mercedes ordering Bottas to block him after his pit stop, but he nevertheless finished second to score his 100th podium finish, becoming only the fifth driver ever to do so. This was followed by a fifth-place finish in Singapore, fourth in Russia and fifth in Japan, where his car sustained damage from a hit by Verstappen.

Räikkönen won the United States Grand Prix, becoming, at 39, F1's oldest race winner since Nigel Mansell in 1994, and the 13th oldest F1 race winner ever. This victory made Räikkönen the most successful Finnish driver of all time in terms of race wins. He broke the record for the longest gap between Grand Prix wins (113 races) and the record for the biggest gap between first and last career wins (5,691 days). Coincidentally, this victory came on the 11th anniversary of his 2007 F1 world championship. He followed this victory with third-placed podiums at the Mexican and Brazilian Grands Prix. He retired in Abu Dhabi with an electrical issue, but nonetheless, he finished third in the Drivers' Championship in his final season with Ferrari.

=== Alfa Romeo (2019–2021) ===
==== 2019 ====
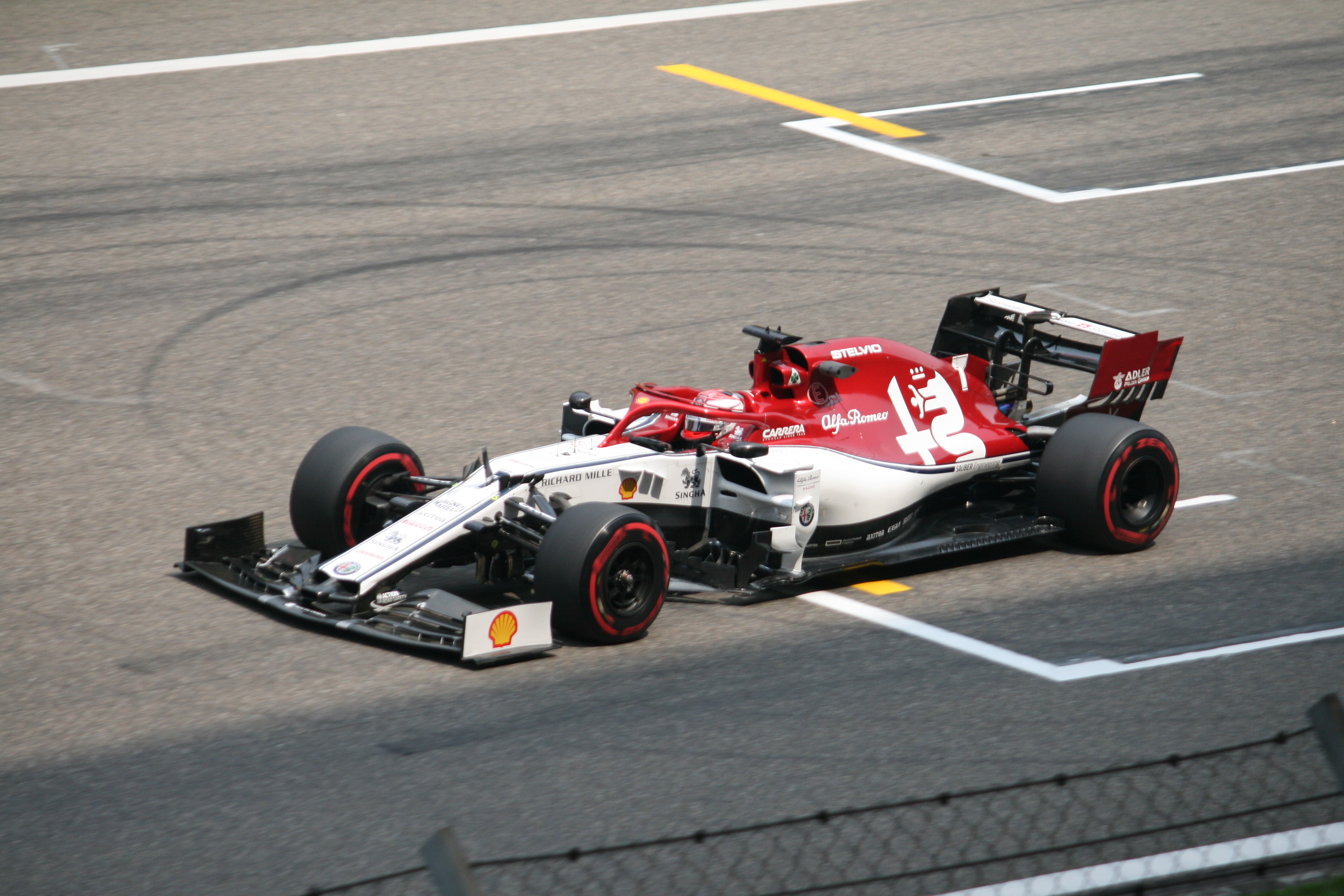
Räikkönen at the 2019 Chinese Grand Prix

On 11 September 2018, it was announced that Räikkönen would leave Ferrari at the end of the season to rejoin Sauber on a two-year contract, the team he made his Formula One debut with in 2001. Räikkönen made his Sauber return in the postseason Abu Dhabi Pirelli tyre test driving their 2018 car. The Sauber team was renamed Alfa Romeo Racing prior to the start of the 2019 season.

Räikkönen had an impressive first half of the season, scoring 31 points before the summer break, placing him eighth in the Drivers' Championship after 12 races. In comparison, his teammate Antonio Giovinazzi had scored only a single point during the same period. However, after the summer break, the Alfa Romeo Racing C38 struggled for pace and Räikkönen endured a seven-race pointless streak. He had an opportunity to score points in Belgium, starting from sixth on the grid, but he was hit by Max Verstappen at the first corner. The pointless streak ended at the Brazilian Grand Prix, where a strong race and a penalty for Lewis Hamilton yielded a fourth-place finish, the first top-four finish for the Hinwil-based team since 2013. Räikkönen finished 12th in the Drivers' Championship with 43 points, which, again, was the best result for a driver of the Hinwil-based team since 2013.

==== 2020 ====
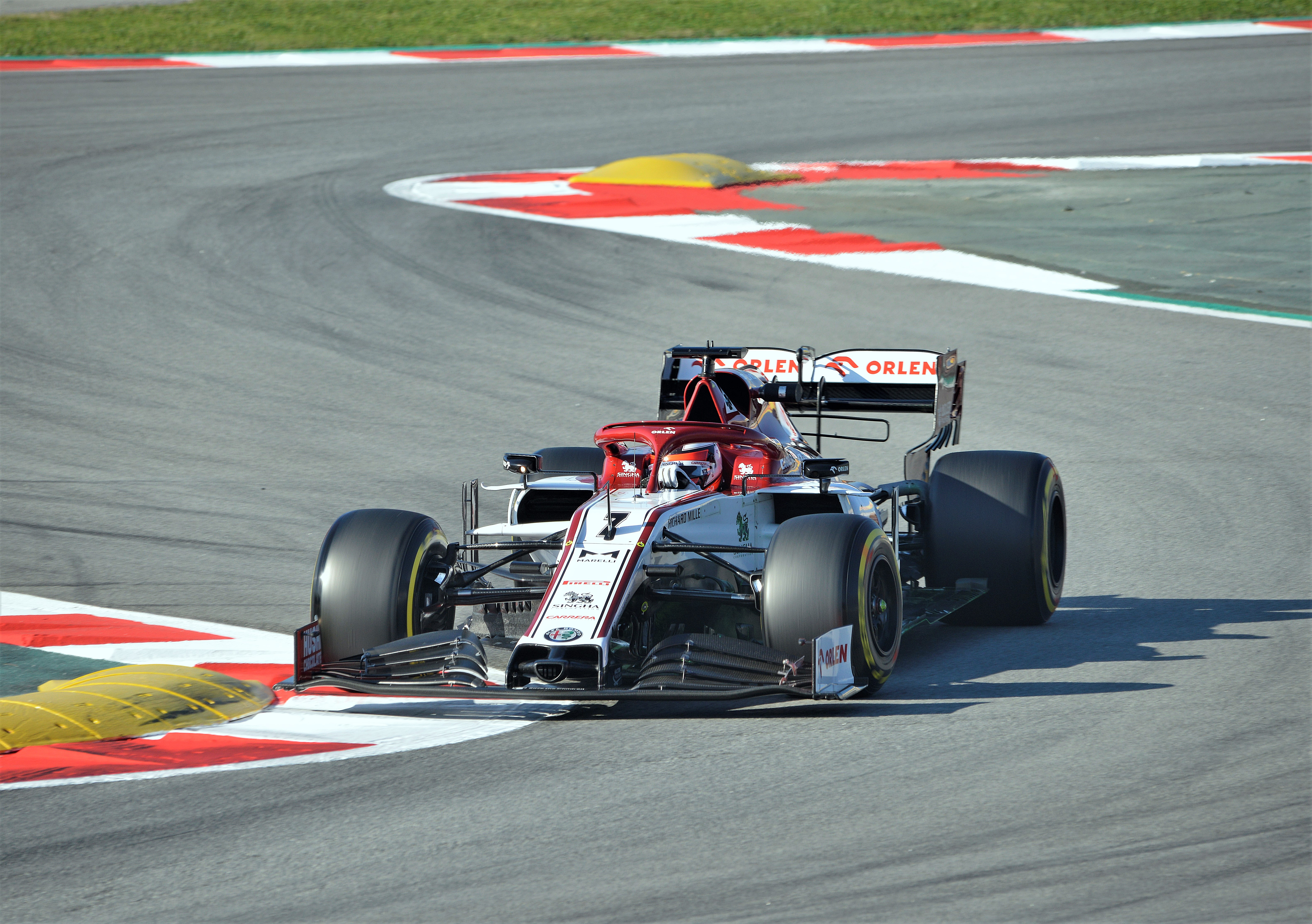
Räikkönen at the pre-season testing in Barcelona

Räikkönen remained at the Alfa Romeo Racing team for the 2020 season. The team's Ferrari-powered car proved to be one of the slowest cars of the season, and the team was left fighting at the back of the grid against Haas and Williams. During the season Räikkönen scored points twice, finishing ninth at the Tuscan Grand Prix and again ninth at the Emilia Romagna Grand Prix, while he scored the team's best qualifying result with eighth in Turkey. During the Italian Grand Prix at Monza, Räikkönen ran as high as second after a red flag and penalties to Lewis Hamilton and Giovinazzi, however ultimately finished 11th and outside the points. These results placed him 16th in the drivers' standings with four points, ahead of teammate Antonio Giovinazzi and the Haas and Williams drivers. Räikkönen was the highest finishing driver among this group in nine of the season's 17 races, while he finished ahead of his teammate in nine of the 13 races which both finished and qualified ahead of him eight times. He was also the highest finishing Ferrari-powered driver on four occasions.

Räikkönen's 323rd Formula One race start at the Eifel Grand Prix saw him break Rubens Barrichello's record for most Formula One race starts in history. He won the FIA Action of the Year award for his opening lap at the Portuguese Grand Prix, where he overtook 10 cars.

==== 2021: Final F1 season ====
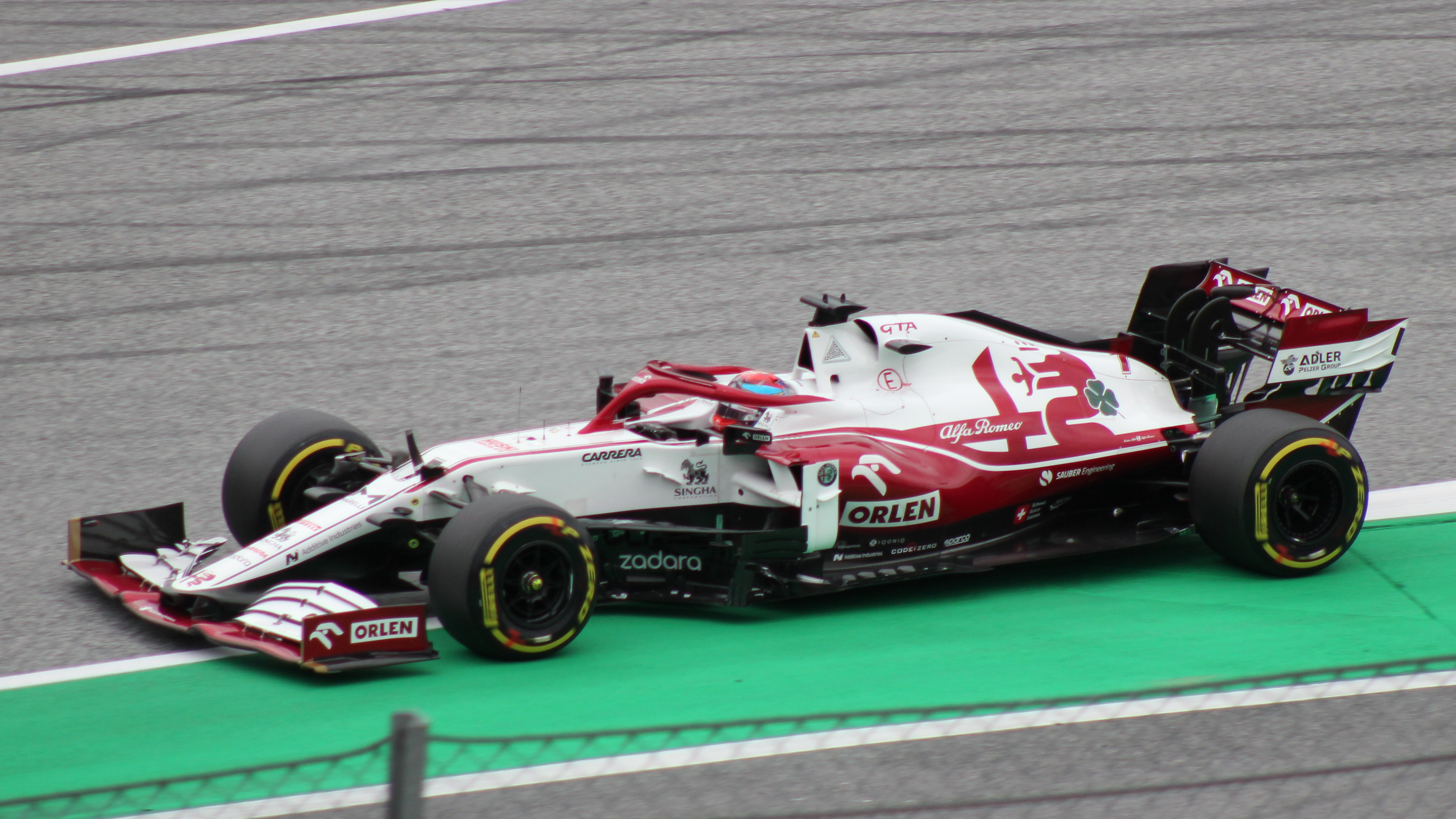
Räikkönen at the 2021 Austrian Grand Prix

Räikkönen continued with Alfa Romeo in 2021 alongside Giovinazzi. Before the season started Räikkönen had decided to retire at the end of the season. He tested positive for COVID-19 on the weekend of the Dutch Grand Prix and was replaced by reserve driver Robert Kubica at the Dutch and Italian Grand Prix. Räikkönen scored his first points of the season in Azerbaijan, with more points in Hungary, Russia and Mexico. In November he visited the Alfa Romeo factory in Switzerland for the last time as a team member and was given a farewell, and was subsequently given a farewell by the Scuderia Ferrari team prior to the race in Abu Dhabi. For his final race in Abu Dhabi the team inscribed "Dear Kimi, we will leave you alone now" on his C41. Räikkönen was forced to retire on lap 25 because of a technical issue with a wheel nut. "It doesn't matter how it comes to the end, it's the end now and yes, I'm looking forward to it," he said after the race. Räikkönen finished the season in 16th place with 10 points.

== Other racing ==
=== Rallying ===
Räikkönen made his initial rally debut at the Arctic Lapland Rally, which ran from 23 to 24 January 2009, driving a Tommi Mäkinen Racing-prepared Abarth Grande Punto S2000. He finished in 13th place. Räikkönen made his WRC debut in the 2009 Rally Finland, which took place between 30 July and 2 August, starting just four days after his second-place finish in the Hungarian Grand Prix. He was running third in group N and 15th overall before crashing out in Väärinmaja, last stage of Saturday.

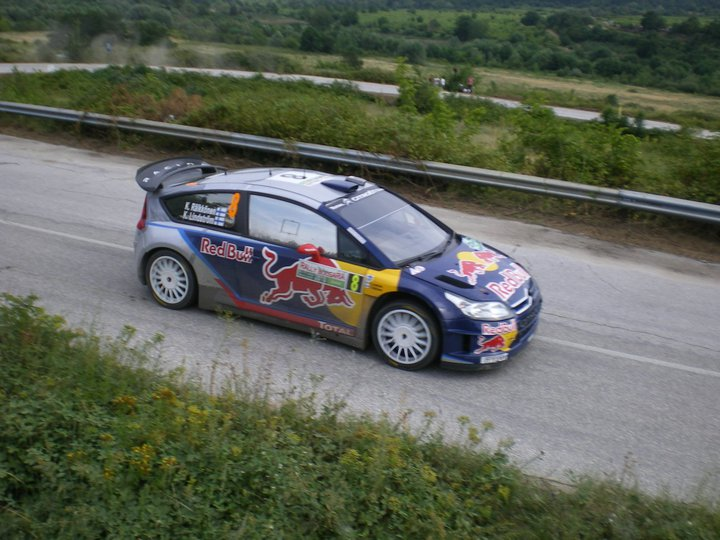
Räikkönen driving a Citroën C4 WRC at the 2010 Rally Bulgaria

On 4 December 2009, it was announced that Räikkönen would altogether shift from Formula 1 to the World Rally Championship for the 2010 season as a full-time driver for the Citroën Junior Team, and that he would be driving a Red Bull-sponsored Citroën C4 WRC with his co-driver, Kaj Lindström. As members of the team, the pair were scheduled to participate in 12 of 13 rallies in the 2010 WRC calendar, the exception being Rally New Zealand.

On 3 April 2010, Räikkönen scored his first WRC points when he finished eighth in the Jordan Rally. Consequently, he became the second driver after Carlos Reutemann to score championship points in both Formula One and the World Rally Championship. In the next WRC event, the Rally of Turkey, Räikkönen improved his best result with a fifth-place finish, 6m 44.3s off the winner, Sébastien Loeb. This result saw him beat established and more experienced drivers in the field.

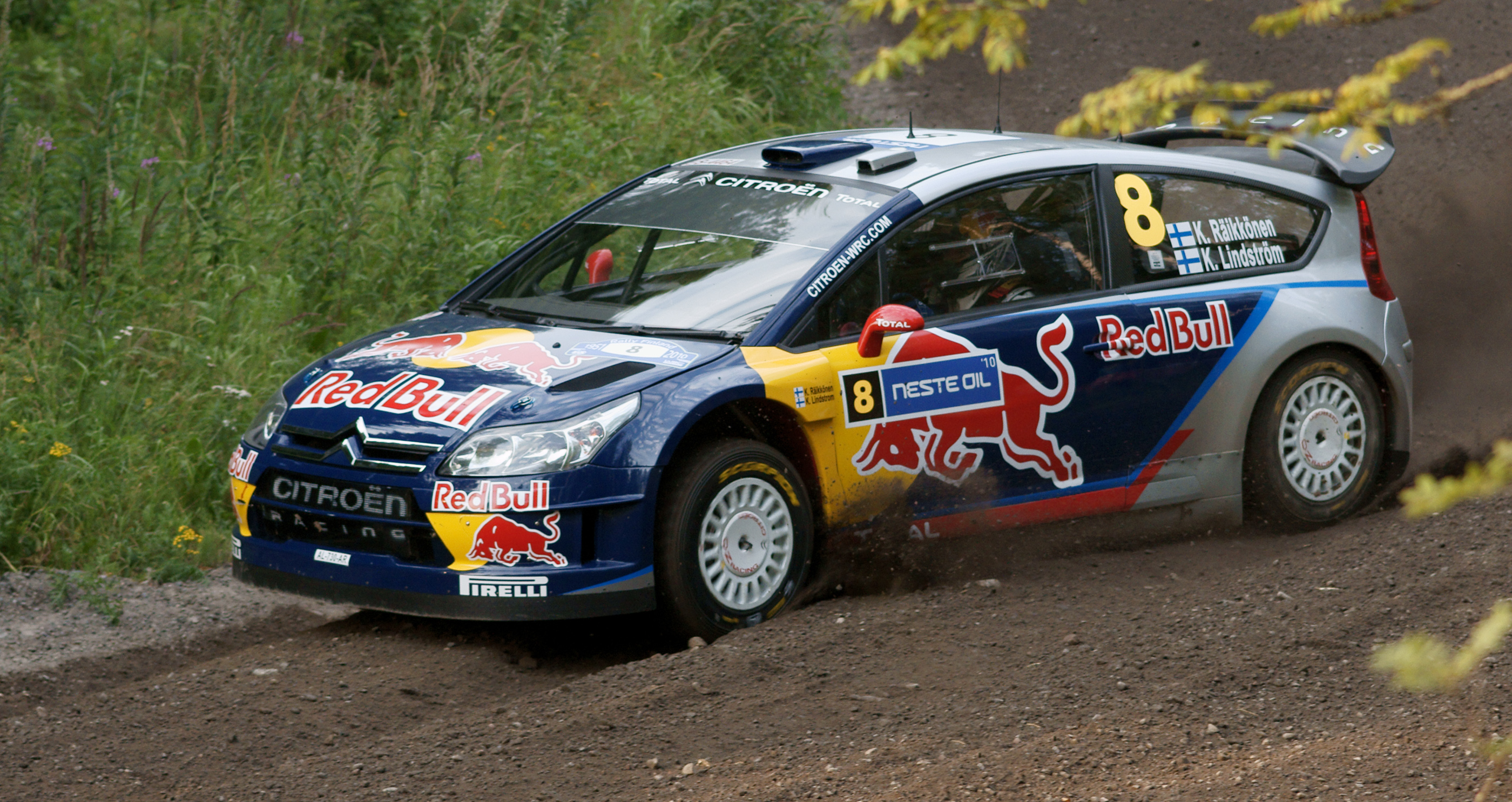
Räikkönen at the 2010 Rally Finland

In the 2010 Rally Finland, the retired four-time World Rally Champion Juha Kankkunen entered the race and said that if Räikkönen cannot beat him then he might as well go back to Formula One. The two were in a close battle for seventh until Räikkönen had a crash on the 12th stage of the rally. He finished seventh in the Rallye Deutschland, his second ever asphalt rally, while scoring his first ever career stage win on the last stage of the rally.

On 18 September 2010, Räikkönen achieved his first rally win when he participated in the Rallye Vosgien 2010 in France. He won all six stages in the asphalt rally. Räikkönen could not start in the Rally Catalunya because he crashed during the shakedown, leaving the roll cage damaged, and the team did not have enough time to repair it. Subsequently, Räikkönen decided to not take part in the rally at all, even when he could by super rally rules. The reason was stated to be saving the car. He would finish eighth in the Wales Rally GB, the final rally of the season. He scored 25 points during the season to finish 10th overall in the championship, the best result for a rookie that year.

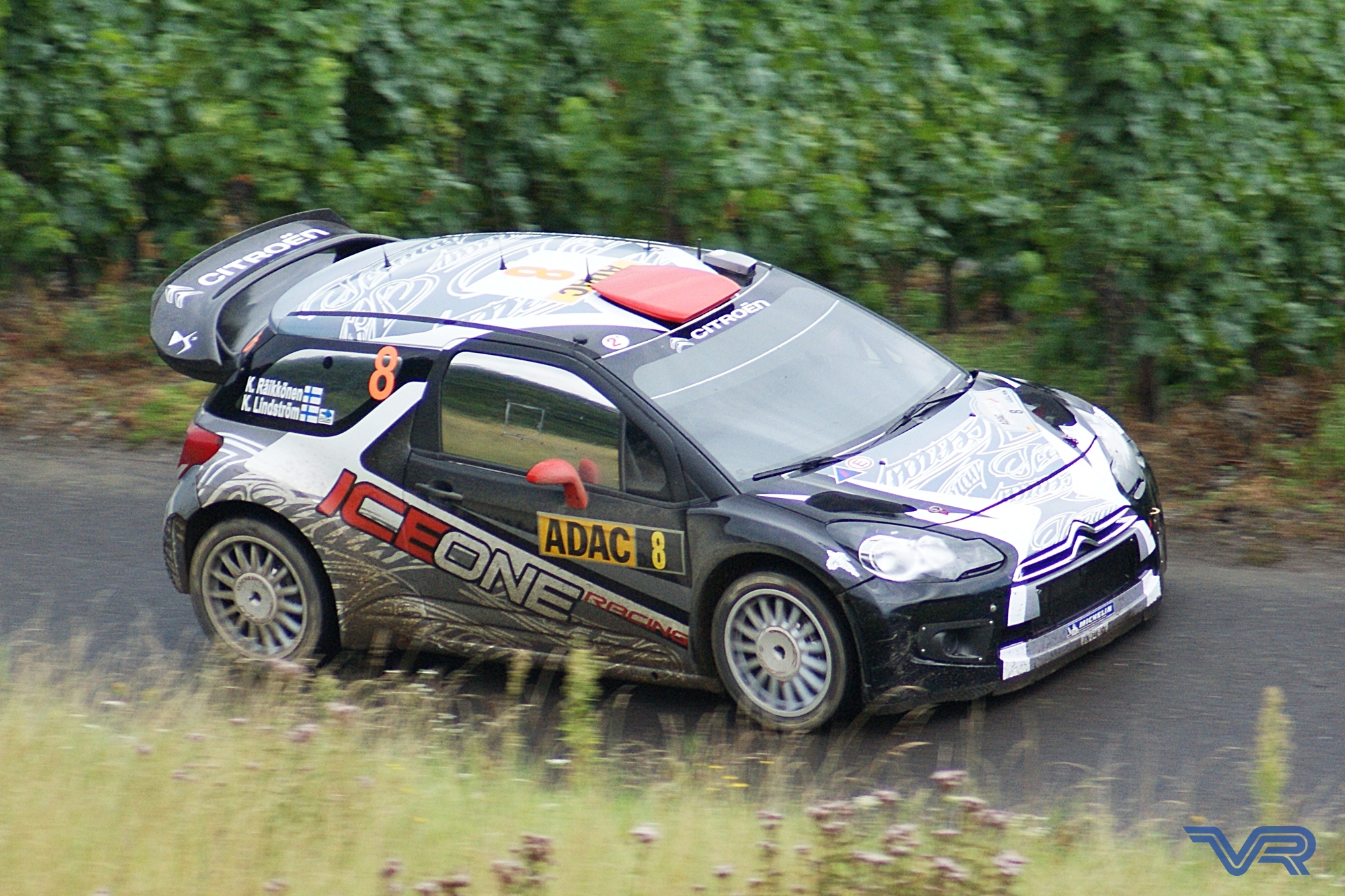
Räikkönen at the 2011 Rallye Deutschland

Räikkönen entered the 2011 World Rally Championship season under his own team, ICE 1 Racing. He drove a Citroën DS3 WRC. He finished eighth in the opening round, Rally Sweden. Skipping the Mexico event, he next competed in Rally Portugal and finished seventh. He finished sixth in the following Jordan Rally, but would skip the next two rounds.

Räikkönen returned in the Acropolis Rally, finishing seventh. He would score points in his home rally, Rally Finland, after finishing ninth. He equaled his best result of the season with sixth in Rallye Deutschland, his seventh consecutive points finish and sixth consecutive points finish of the season. After the good form, the season ended in three retirements in the last three rallies. Räikkönen scored 34 points during the season, nine more than in 2010. Despite the increased number of points, he would again finish 10th in the championship.

=== NASCAR ===
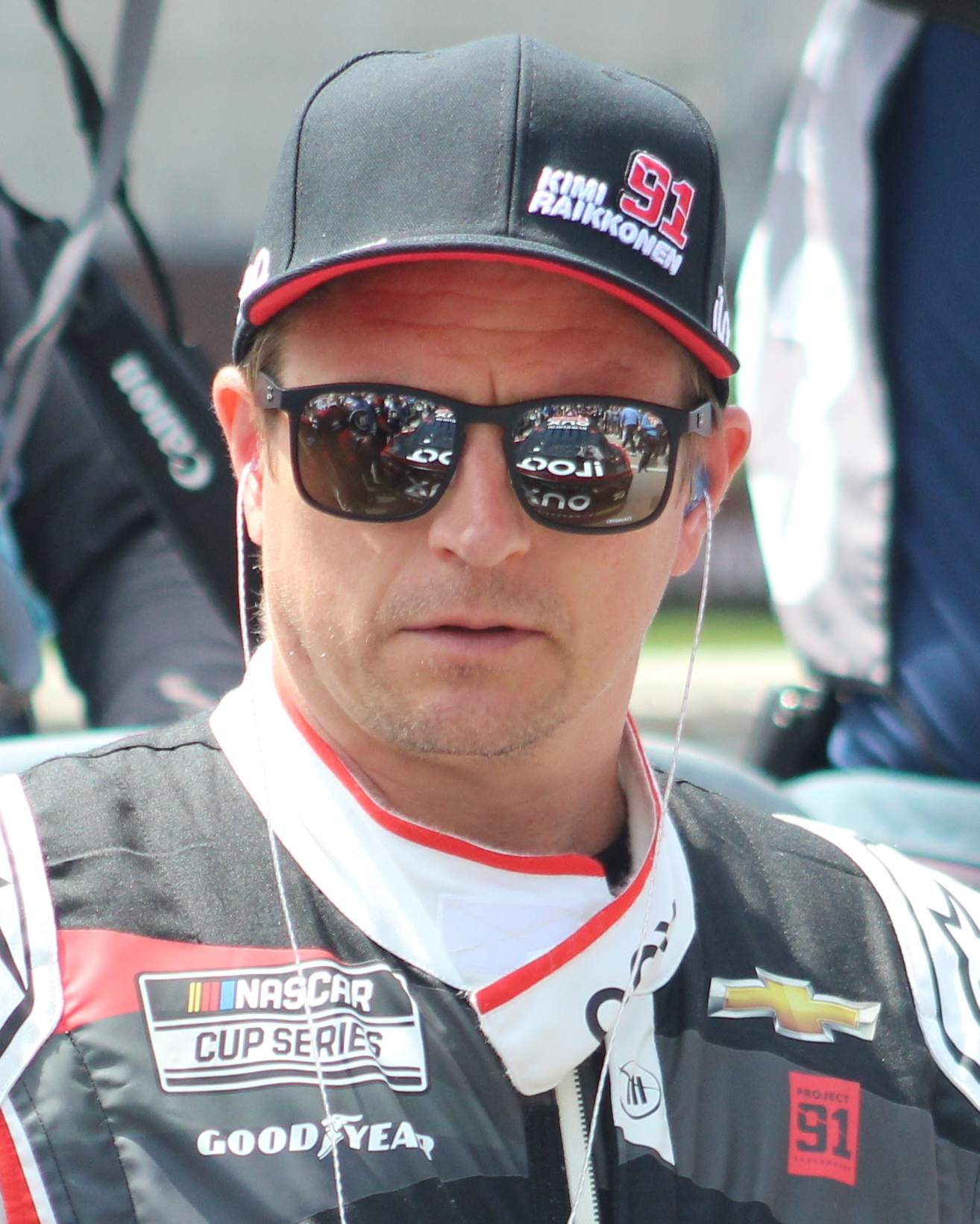
Räikkönen in 2023

It was reported on 29 March 2011 that Räikkönen would try his hand at NASCAR starting in the Truck Series in the summer of 2011 with an eye on also running in the Nationwide and Sprint Cup Series. On 2 April Räikkönen signed a deal with Toyota team Kyle Busch Motorsports to run a limited schedule in the Truck Series.

On 20 May, Räikkönen debuted at the North Carolina Education Lottery 200 at Charlotte Motor Speedway with a strong finish of 15th, though he started the day with tough practice sessions and qualified only at 31 out of 37 trucks. His race craft was well received by team crew chief Rick Ren and his teammate Kyle Busch. Räikkönen went on to race in the Nationwide Series at the same track on 28 May driving for Joe Nemechek and NEMCO Motorsports. He finished 27th after having debris stuck on the grille of his car and getting a penalty for speeding in the pitlane. Later in the month, Räikkönen tested Robby Gordon's car at Infineon Raceway, with plans of Gordon fielding a two-car team for him and Räikkönen at the Toyota/Save Mart 350. However, Räikkönen crashed the car in the test, and the deal with Robby Gordon Motorsports fell through.

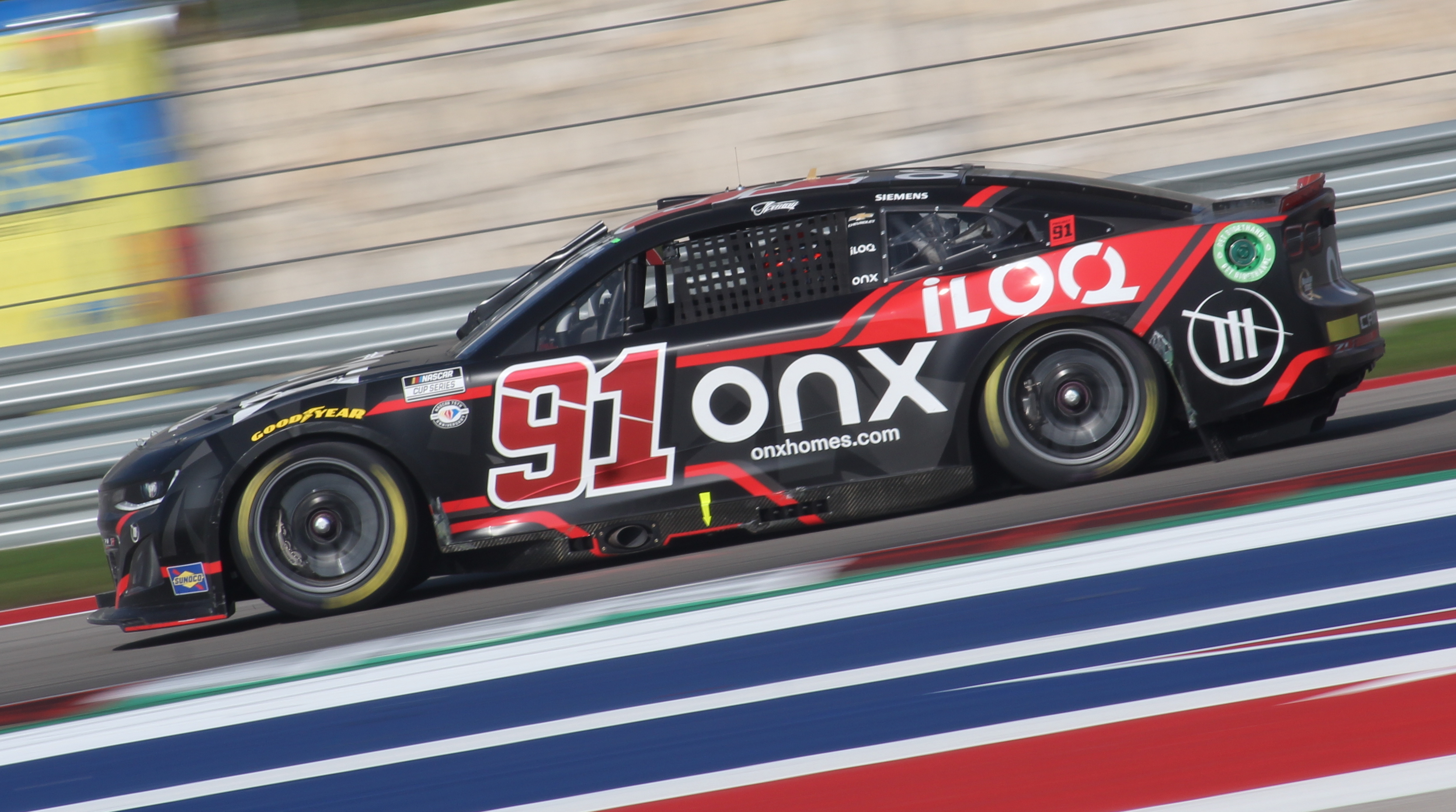
Räikkönen at the Circuit of the Americas in 2023

In May 2022, Trackhouse Racing announced that Räikkönen would make his Cup Series debut in the No. 91 Chevrolet at the 2022 Go Bowling at The Glen at Watkins Glen International. Having previously only driven the car in an acclimatisation test at Virginia International Raceway and one 20-minute practice session, Räikkönen qualified 27th out of 39 cars, notably ahead of fellow debutant Mike Rockenfeller and former Formula One driver Daniil Kvyat. In the race, he ran in the top ten at one point, but was classified 37th after being crashed out of 25th place following contact from Loris Hezemans trying to find a way past a spinning Austin Dillon.

In March 2023, Räikkönen returned to the No. 91 at the Circuit of the Americas, where he qualified 22nd and ran in the mid-pack for most of the race, before a pit stop just before a caution period resulted in him rising to fourth place with nine laps remaining. A chaotic end to the race with multiple restarts and incidents saw him ultimately finish 29th.

== Personal life ==
Räikkönen met Finnish model and former Miss Scandinavia, Jenni Dahlman, in 2002. The couple married on 31 July 2004, living between Switzerland and Finland. They separated in February 2013, and divorced in 2014. Räikkönen then became engaged to model Minna-Mari "Minttu" Virtanen. On 28 January 2015, Virtanen gave birth to the couple's first child, a son. On 7 August 2016, Räikkönen married Virtanen in a ceremony in Siena, Italy. On 16 May 2017, Räikkönen became a father for the second time with the birth of his daughter. Räikkönen's third child, another daughter, was born in June 2023. In 2023, the family moved from Switzerland to Como, Italy. Former Ferrari employee Gino Rosato is known as a good friend of Räikkönen and the godfather of his son Robin.

Räikkönen's hobbies include snowboarding and ice hockey. He has also competed in several different kinds of motorsport events. In March 2007, while his Formula One rivals were in Australia preparing for the season opener, Räikkönen competed in a snowmobile race in Finland under the pseudonym "James Hunt", referring to the 1976 world champion whose "playboy" lifestyle has been compared with Räikkönen's own. Räikkönen won the Enduro Sprint race by over 20 seconds with his Lynx. Later in the year, he and two friends entered a powerboat race in the Finnish harbour city of Hanko while wearing gorilla suits. Again, he raced under the name "James Hunt". They then won a prize for the best-dressed crew.

In August 2008, it was announced that Räikkönen would appear on a set of Finnish postage stamps. The stamps, which were released to commemorate the Finnish postal service's 370th anniversary, feature images of him racing and on the podium, with the words "F1 World Champion '07 Kimi Räikkönen". Forbes magazine listed Räikkönen 36th in their 2008 "Celebrity 100" as the 26th highest paid celebrity and fifth highest paid sportsman. The same list in 2009 recorded him as the second highest-paid athlete.

In 2011, Räikkönen founded his own Motocross World Championship team, Ice 1 Racing. The team consists of MX1 rider Toni Eriksson and MX2 rider Ludde Söderberg and is managed by seven-time enduro world champion Kari Tiainen. The Ice 1 Racing team also supports six junior riders competing in the Finnish national championship.

In 2018, Ferrari filed legal action on behalf of Räikkönen with Canadian authorities. The complaint claimed Räikkönen was being extorted by a woman demanding compensation and threatening to publicly accuse him of sexual misconduct at a function after the 2016 Canadian Grand Prix.

Räikkönen stated in 2007 that he believes in God. He has claimed his favorite movie to be Scarface. Räikkönen is also recognized for having a distinctive voice. Räikkönen has said that the reason behind it is a bicycle accident that he suffered when he was 5 years old. Räikkönen fell, hit his neck on the bicycle handlebar, and injured his vocal cords, which never fully healed. Sebastian Vettel and Antonio Giovinazzi, his teammates from Ferrari and Alfa Romeo, are two of his close friends.

== Public persona and reaction ==
Räikkönen is known for his dislike of giving media interviews, and frequently answers questions in a blunt and monosyllabic manner. In the build-up to the 2006 Brazilian Grand Prix, when then-ITV pundit Martin Brundle asked Räikkönen why he missed a ceremony in which footballer Pelé presented Michael Schumacher with a lifetime achievement award, Räikkönen replied "I was having a shit".

During his early years at McLaren, Ron Dennis gave him the nickname, "Iceman", with several layers of meaning; apart from its association with the cold climate of Finland, he is widely considered to have a cool temperament under pressure and also an 'icy' persona with most other drivers, team members and the media. He has said that he is "not here to try to please people. I'm here to do my best" and, in a post-race interview after winning the 2012 Abu Dhabi Grand Prix, "Last time you guys was giving me shit because I didn't really smile enough".

Apart from his on-track driving, off-track instances demonstrating this calm demeanour include being asleep 30 minutes before his first Formula One race and eating an ice cream during the temporarily suspended 2009 Malaysian Grand Prix.

I don't think you can have an argument or a problem with Kimi. If you do, the problem is not him, the problem is you.

— Sebastian Vettel, speaking about Räikkönen in 2021.

Known to be frustrated by anything that prevents him from simply racing, he is relatively outspoken in his criticism of politics and off-circuit drama in sport. In a rare feature interview in the middle of the 2013 season, Räikkönen said "sometimes in Formula 1 there is politics, and the shit there is stupid". In the same article, Lotus team principal Éric Boullier described Räikkönen as someone "doing pretty much whatever he wants".

During the 2006 Monaco Grand Prix, his McLaren MP4-21 broke down as the heat shield had exploded and he was forced to retire; he went from his car straight to his nearby yacht, fully dressed in his racing suit and immediately relaxed in his jacuzzi.

I don't want to put some kind of limits on how you remember. I mean, I don't care much because I luckily been able to do most of the things how I wish to do it. And whatever they remember, good way or bad way, it's a memory and it's fine for me.

— When asked how he wanted to be remembered by F1 fans from around the world, during his last "Beyond The Grid" appearance.

Räikkönen's terse radio communications have sometimes attracted comment. On the 20th lap of the 2012 Abu Dhabi Grand Prix, Räikkönen had just taken the lead from Lewis Hamilton and his race engineer Simon Rennie advised that Fernando Alonso was five seconds behind and that he would be kept informed of Alonso's pace; Räikkönen replied, "Just leave me alone, I know what to do!". Later in the same race, he admonished his team again, when being told to manage the tyre temperature: "Yes, yes, yes, yes, I'm doing that all the time. You don't have to remind me every ten seconds!". The first quote attracted significant press coverage, and Räikkönen made no attempt to apologise in the post-race interview. It was earlier reported that he printed 500 T-shirts with the quote for the entire Lotus team, but this was later denied by Räikkönen in an interview with Formula One Group media personnel. The quote was featured on his official website.

== Helmet ==
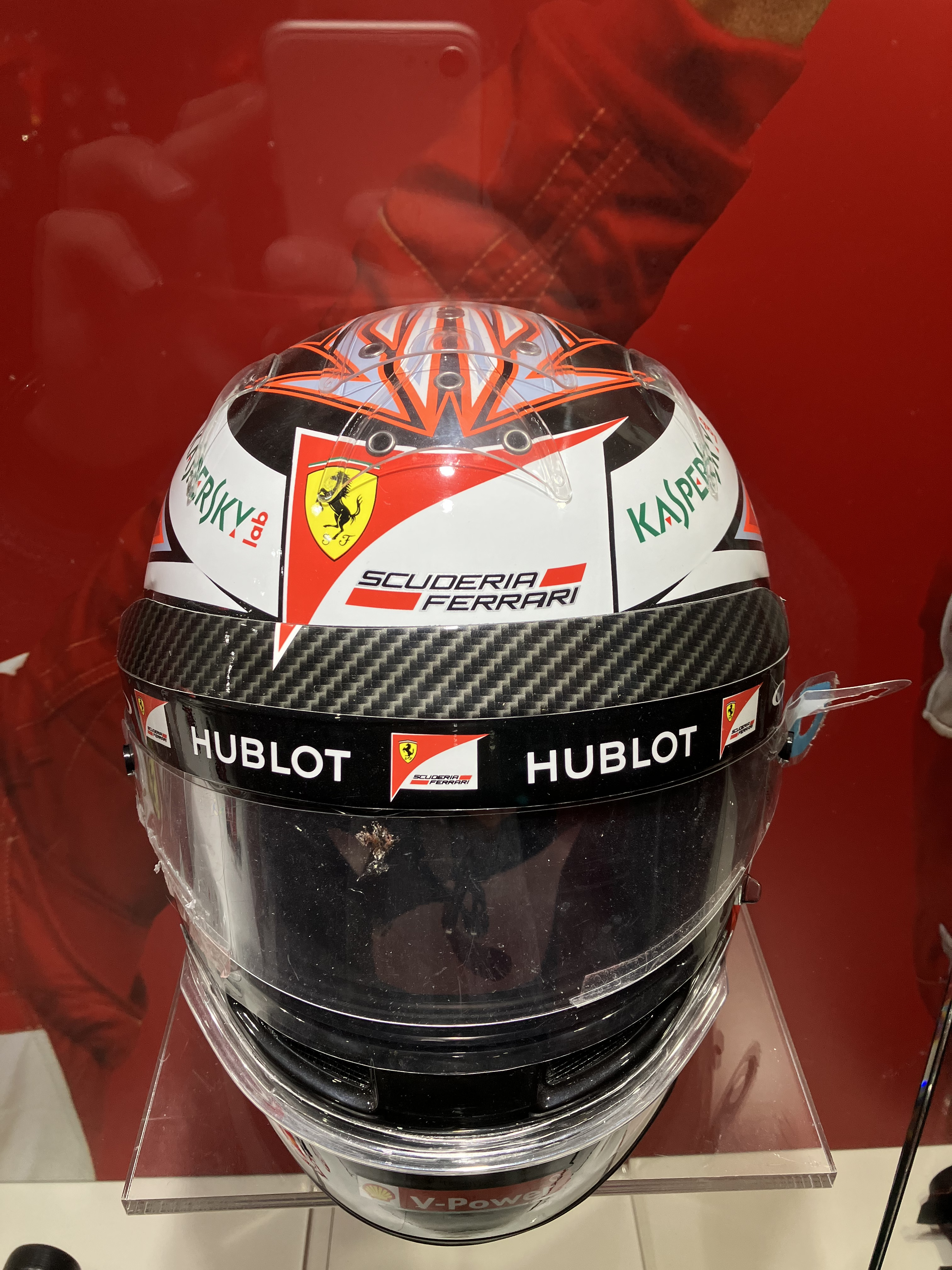
Helmet used when Räikkönen raced for Ferrari seen at Museo Ferrari

The insignia that appears on the top of Räikkönen's helmet

Räikkönen's helmet, designed by UffeDesigns, manufactured by Arai (2001–2006, 2012), Bell (2013, 2015–2021), and Schuberth (2007–2009, 2014), slightly changed during the years. His helmet has also always featured a V design running on the circle top (representing a flying bird) and the inscription "Iceman". The trident insignia was painted in white during his time racing for Sauber and McLaren until 2005, and red from 2006 with McLaren and during his time with Ferrari.

Initially his helmet was predominantly blue with white and silver details, but its colours and detailing changed over time. When racing for Ferrari Räikkönen's helmet changed radically: it was white with the middle part black and red with tribal designs. He retained this design in some rallies, although the helmet style was significantly different for this discipline. In WRC and NASCAR he used a blue Stilo helmet with Red Bull's logo, silver and white accents (to resemble Red Bull's can design and Räikkönen's Sauber helmet lines). Upon his return to Formula One, he sported a black helmet with white and red diagonals. For the Monaco Grand Prix, he wore a replica of the 1976 James Hunt helmet. Upon his return to Ferrari in 2014, the base colour became a vibrant red, with white diagonal lines crossing from each side. In 2015, his helmet reverted to a white base. As of 2014, Räikkönen continued to race with a Bell model rather than Ferrari's official supplier Schuberth.

== Other ventures ==
In 2022, after his retirement from Formula One, Räikkönen was named the team principal of the Kawasaki Racing Team for the 2022 season of the Motocross World Championship.

== Karting record ==
=== Karting career summary ===
Season	Series	Position
1995	Nordic Championship — ICA	3rd
1997	Nordic Championship — ICA	4th
1997	Finnish Championship — ICA	1st
1997	CIK-FIA World Championship — FSA	30th
1998	Andrea Margutti Trophy — FA	4th
1998	Nordic Championship — ICA	1st
1998	Finnish Championship — ICA	1st
1998	Finnish Championship — FA	1st
1998	CIK-FIA World Championship — FSA	24th
1999	Finnish Championship — FA	2nd
1999	CIK-FIA World Championship — FSA	10th

== Racing record ==
=== Racing career summary ===
Season	Series	Team	Races	Wins	Poles	F/Laps	Podiums	Points	Position
1999	European Formula Ford	?	2	?	?	?	?	?	5th
1999	Formula Ford Festival	Continental Racing Van Diemen	1	0	0	0	0	—N/a	NC
1999	Formula Renault UK Winter Championship	Manor Motorsport	4	4	4	?	4	40	**1st**
1999	Formula Renault UK	Haywood Racing	4	0	0	?	?	?	?
2000	Formula Renault UK	Manor Motorsport	10	7	6	7	10	316	**1st**
2000	Formula Renault 2000 Eurocup	Manor Motorsport	2	2	1	0	2	62	7th
2001	Formula One	Red Bull Sauber Petronas	17	0	0	0	0	9	10th
2002	Formula One	West McLaren Mercedes	17	0	0	1	4	24	6th
2003	Formula One	West McLaren Mercedes	16	1	2	3	10	91	**2nd**
2004	Formula One	West McLaren Mercedes	18	1	1	2	4	45	7th
2005	Formula One	West McLaren Mercedes; Team McLaren Mercedes	19	7	5	10	12	112	**2nd**
2006	Formula One	Team McLaren Mercedes	18	0	3	3	6	65	5th
2007	Formula One	Scuderia Ferrari Marlboro	17	6	3	6	12	110	**1st**
2008	Formula One	Scuderia Ferrari Marlboro	18	2	2	10	9	75	**3rd**
2009	Formula One	Scuderia Ferrari Marlboro	17	1	0	0	5	48	6th
2009	World Rally Championship	Tommi Mäkinen Racing	1	0	—	—	0	—N/a	NC
2010	World Rally Championship	Citroën Junior Team	11	0	—	—	0	25	10th
2011	World Rally Championship	Ice 1 Racing	9	0	—	—	0	34	10th
2011	NASCAR Camping World Truck Series	Kyle Busch Motorsports	1	0	0	0	0	—N/a	NC
2011	NASCAR Nationwide Series	NEMCO Motorsports/KBM	1	0	0	0	0	—N/a	NC
2012	Formula One	Lotus F1 Team	20	1	0	2	7	207	**3rd**
2013	Formula One	Lotus F1 Team	17	1	0	2	8	183	5th
2014	Formula One	Scuderia Ferrari	19	0	0	1	0	55	12th
2015	Formula One	Scuderia Ferrari	19	0	0	2	3	150	4th
2016	Formula One	Scuderia Ferrari	21	0	0	1	4	186	6th
2017	Formula One	Scuderia Ferrari	20	0	1	2	7	205	4th
2018	Formula One	Scuderia Ferrari	21	1	1	1	12	251	**3rd**
2019	Formula One	Alfa Romeo Racing	21	0	0	0	0	43	12th
2020	Formula One	Alfa Romeo Racing ORLEN	17	0	0	0	0	4	16th
2021	Formula One	Alfa Romeo Racing ORLEN	21	0	0	0	0	10	16th
2022	NASCAR Cup Series	Trackhouse Racing	1	0	0	0	0	1	41st
2023	NASCAR Cup Series	Trackhouse Racing	1	0	0	0	0	8	40th

=== Complete Formula Renault 2.0 UK results ===
(key) (Races in bold indicate pole position; races in italics indicate fastest lap)

Year	Entrant	1	2	3	4	5	6	7	8	9	10	11	12	DC	Points
2000	Manor Motorsport	BRH; 3	**DON**; 1	**THR**; 1	KNO; 2	**OUL**; 1	SIL; 3	**CRO**; 1	SNE; 1	**DON**; 1	**BRH**; 1	OUL	SIL	1st	316

=== Complete Formula One results ===
(key) (Races in bold indicate pole position; races in italics indicate fastest lap)

Year	Entrant	Chassis	Engine	1	2	3	4	5	6	7	8	9	10	11	12	13	14	15	16	17	18	19	20	21	22	WDC	Points
2001	Red Bull Sauber Petronas	Sauber C20	Petronas 01A 3.0 V10	AUS; 6	MAL; Ret	BRA; Ret	SMR; Ret	ESP; 8	AUT; 4	MON; 10	CAN; 4	EUR; 10	FRA; 7	GBR; 5	GER; Ret	HUN; 7	BEL; DNS	ITA; 7	USA; Ret	JPN; Ret						10th	9
2002	West McLaren Mercedes	McLaren MP4-17	Mercedes FO 110M 3.0 V10	AUS; 3	MAL; Ret	BRA; 12†	SMR; Ret	ESP; Ret	AUT; Ret	MON; Ret	CAN; 4	EUR; 3	GBR; Ret	FRA; 2	GER; Ret	HUN; 4	BEL; Ret	ITA; Ret	USA; Ret	JPN; 3						6th	24
2003	West McLaren Mercedes	McLaren MP4-17D	Mercedes FO 110M/P 3.0 V10	AUS; 3	MAL; 1	BRA; 2	SMR; 2	ESP; Ret	AUT; 2	MON; 2	CAN; 6	**EUR**; Ret	FRA; 4	GBR; 3	GER; Ret	HUN; 2	ITA; 4	**USA**; 2	JPN; 2							2nd	91
2004	West McLaren Mercedes	McLaren MP4-19	Mercedes FO 110Q 3.0 V10	AUS; Ret	MAL; Ret	BHR; Ret	SMR; 8	ESP; 11	MON; Ret	EUR; Ret	CAN; 5	USA; 6														7th	45
2004	West McLaren Mercedes	McLaren MP4-19B	Mercedes FO 110Q 3.0 V10										FRA; 7	**GBR**; 2	GER; Ret	HUN; Ret	BEL; 1	ITA; Ret	CHN; 3	JPN; 6	BRA; 2					7th	45
2005	West McLaren Mercedes	McLaren MP4-20	Mercedes FO 110R 3.0 V10	AUS; 8	MAL; 9	BHR; 3	**SMR**; Ret	**ESP**; 1	**MON**; 1	EUR; 11†	CAN; 1	USA; DNS	FRA; 2	GBR; 3	**GER**; Ret											2nd	112
2005	Team McLaren Mercedes	McLaren MP4-20	Mercedes FO 110R 3.0 V10													HUN; 1	**TUR**; 1	ITA; 4	BEL; 1	BRA; 2	JPN; 1	CHN; 2				2nd	112
2006	Team McLaren Mercedes	McLaren MP4-21	Mercedes FO 108S 2.4 V8	BHR; 3	MAL; Ret	AUS; 2	SMR; 5	EUR; 4	ESP; 5	MON; Ret	GBR; 3	CAN; 3	USA; Ret	FRA; 5	**GER**; 3	**HUN**; Ret	TUR; Ret	**ITA**; 2	CHN; Ret	JPN; 5	BRA; 5					5th	65
2007	Scuderia Ferrari Marlboro	Ferrari F2007	Ferrari 056 2.4 V8	**AUS**; 1	MAL; 3	BHR; 3	ESP; Ret	MON; 8	CAN; 5	USA; 4	FRA; 1	GBR; 1	**EUR**; Ret	HUN; 2	TUR; 2	ITA; 3	**BEL**; 1	JPN; 3	CHN; 1	BRA; 1						1st	110
2008	Scuderia Ferrari Marlboro	Ferrari F2008	Ferrari 056 2.4 V8	AUS; 8†	MAL; 1	BHR; 2	**ESP**; 1	TUR; 3	MON; 9	CAN; Ret	**FRA**; 2	GBR; 4	GER; 6	HUN; 3	EUR; Ret	BEL; 18†	ITA; 9	SIN; 15†	JPN; 3	CHN; 3	BRA; 3					3rd	75
2009	Scuderia Ferrari Marlboro	Ferrari F60	Ferrari 056 2.4 V8	AUS; 15†	MAL; 14	CHN; 10	BHR; 6	ESP; Ret	MON; 3	TUR; 9	GBR; 8	GER; Ret	HUN; 2	EUR; 3	BEL; 1	ITA; 3	SIN; 10	JPN; 4	BRA; 6	ABU; 12						6th	48
2012	Lotus F1 Team	Lotus E20	Renault RS27-2012 2.4 V8	AUS; 7	MAL; 5	CHN; 14	BHR; 2	ESP; 3	MON; 9	CAN; 8	EUR; 2	GBR; 5	GER; 3	HUN; 2	BEL; 3	ITA; 5	SIN; 6	JPN; 6	KOR; 5	IND; 7	ABU; 1	USA; 6	BRA; 10			3rd	207
2013	Lotus F1 Team	Lotus E21	Renault RS27-2013 2.4 V8	AUS; 1	MAL; 7	CHN; 2	BHR; 2	ESP; 2	MON; 10	CAN; 9	GBR; 5	GER; 2	HUN; 2	BEL; Ret	ITA; 11	SIN; 3	KOR; 2	JPN; 5	IND; 7	ABU; Ret	USA	BRA				5th	183
2014	Scuderia Ferrari	Ferrari F14 T	Ferrari 059/3 1.6 V6 t	AUS; 7	MAL; 12	BHR; 10	CHN; 8	ESP; 7	MON; 12	CAN; 10	AUT; 10	GBR; Ret	GER; 11	HUN; 6	BEL; 4	ITA; 9	SIN; 8	JPN; 12	RUS; 9	USA; 13	BRA; 7	ABU; 10				12th	55
2015	Scuderia Ferrari	Ferrari SF15-T	Ferrari 060 1.6 V6 t	AUS; Ret	MAL; 4	CHN; 4	BHR; 2	ESP; 5	MON; 6	CAN; 4	AUT; Ret	GBR; 8	HUN; Ret	BEL; 7	ITA; 5	SIN; 3	JPN; 4	RUS; 8	USA; Ret	MEX; Ret	BRA; 4	ABU; 3				4th	150
2016	Scuderia Ferrari	Ferrari SF16-H	Ferrari 061 1.6 V6 t	AUS; Ret	BHR; 2	CHN; 5	RUS; 3	ESP; 2	MON; Ret	CAN; 6	EUR; 4	AUT; 3	GBR; 5	HUN; 6	GER; 6	BEL; 9	ITA; 4	SIN; 4	MAL; 4	JPN; 5	USA; Ret	MEX; 6	BRA; Ret	ABU; 6		6th	186
2017	Scuderia Ferrari	Ferrari SF70H	Ferrari 062 1.6 V6 t	AUS; 4	CHN; 5	BHR; 4	RUS; 3	ESP; Ret	**MON**; 2	CAN; 7	AZE; 14†	AUT; 5	GBR; 3	HUN; 2	BEL; 4	ITA; 5	SIN; Ret	MAL; DNS	JPN; 5	USA; 3	MEX; 3	BRA; 3	ABU; 4			4th	205
2018	Scuderia Ferrari	Ferrari SF71H	Ferrari 062 EVO 1.6 V6 t	AUS; 3	BHR; Ret	CHN; 3	AZE; 2	ESP; Ret	MON; 4	CAN; 6	FRA; 3	AUT; 2	GBR; 3	GER; 3	HUN; 3	BEL; Ret	**ITA**; 2	SIN; 5	RUS; 4	JPN; 5	USA; 1	MEX; 3	BRA; 3	ABU; Ret		3rd	251
2019	Alfa Romeo Racing	Alfa Romeo Racing C38	Ferrari 064 1.6 V6 t	AUS; 8	BHR; 7	CHN; 9	AZE; 10	ESP; 14	MON; 17	CAN; 15	FRA; 7	AUT; 9	GBR; 8	GER; 12	HUN; 7	BEL; 16	ITA; 15	SIN; Ret	RUS; 13	JPN; 12	MEX; Ret	USA; 11	BRA; 4	ABU; 13		12th	43
2020	Alfa Romeo Racing Orlen	Alfa Romeo Racing C39	Ferrari 065 1.6 V6 t	AUT; Ret	STY; 11	HUN; 15	GBR; 17	70A; 15	ESP; 14	BEL; 12	ITA; 13	TUS; 9	RUS; 14	EIF; 12	POR; 11	EMI; 9	TUR; 15	BHR; 15	SKH; 14	ABU; 12						16th	4
2021	Alfa Romeo Racing Orlen	Alfa Romeo Racing C41	Ferrari 065/6 1.6 V6 t	BHR; 11	EMI; 13	POR; Ret	ESP; 12	MON; 11	AZE; 10	FRA; 17	STY; 11	AUT; 15	GBR; 15	HUN; 10	BEL; 18	NED; WD	ITA	RUS; 8	TUR; 12	USA; 13	MXC; 8	SAP; 12	QAT; 14	SAU; 15	ABU; Ret	16th	10

^{†} Did not finish, but was classified as he had completed more than 90% of the race distance.

=== Complete WRC results ===
Year	Entrant	Car	1	2	3	4	5	6	7	8	9	10	11	12	13	WDC	Points
2009	Tommi Mäkinen Racing	Fiat Grande Punto S2000	IRE	NOR	CYP	POR	ARG	ITA	GRE	POL	FIN; Ret	AUS	ESP	GBR		NC	0
2010	Citroën Junior Team	Citroën C4 WRC	SWE; 29	MEX; Ret	JOR; 8	TUR; 5	NZL	POR; 10	BUL; 11	FIN; 25	GER; 7	JPN; Ret	FRA; Ret	ESP; DNS	GBR; 8	10th	25
2011	ICE 1 Racing	Citroën DS3 WRC	SWE; 8	MEX	POR; 7	JOR; 6	ITA	ARG	GRE; 7	FIN; 9	GER; 6	AUS; WD	FRA; Ret	ESP; Ret	GBR; Ret	10th	34

=== NASCAR ===
(key) (Bold – Pole position awarded by qualifying time. Italics – Pole position earned by points standings or practice time. * – Most laps led.)

==== Cup Series ====
NASCAR Cup Series results
Year	Team	No.	Make	1	2	3	4	5	6	7	8	9	10	11	12	13	14	15	16	17	18	19	20	21	22	23	24	25	26	27	28	29	30	31	32	33	34	35	36	NCSC	Pts	Ref
2022	Trackhouse Racing	91	Chevy	DAY	CAL	LVS	PHO	ATL	COA	RCH	MAR	BRI	TAL	DOV	DAR	KAN	CLT	GTW	SON	NSH	ROA	ATL	NHA	POC	IRC	MCH	RCH	GLN; 37	DAY	DAR	KAN	BRI	TEX	TAL	CLT	LVS	HOM	MAR	PHO	41st	1	
2023	Trackhouse Racing	91	Chevy	DAY	CAL	LVS	PHO	ATL	COA; 29	RCH	BRD	MAR	TAL	DOV	KAN	DAR	CLT	GTW	SON	NSH	CSC	ATL	NHA	POC	RCH	MCH	IRC	GLN	DAY	DAR	KAN	BRI	TEX	TAL	ROV	LVS	HOM	MAR	PHO	40th	8	

==== Nationwide Series ====
NASCAR Nationwide Series results
Year	Team	No.	Make	1	2	3	4	5	6	7	8	9	10	11	12	13	14	15	16	17	18	19	20	21	22	23	24	25	26	27	28	29	30	31	32	33	34	NNSC	Pts	Ref
2011	Kyle Busch Motorsports	87	Toyota	DAY	PHO	LVS	BRI	CAL	TEX	TAL	NSH	RCH	DAR	DOV	IOW	CLT; 27	CHI	MCH	ROA	DAY	KEN	NHA	NSH	IRP	IOW	GLN	CGV	BRI	ATL	RCH	CHI	DOV	KAN	CLT	TEX	PHO	HOM	89th	0^{1}	

==== Camping World Truck Series ====
NASCAR Camping World Truck Series results
Year	Team	No.	Make	1	2	3	4	5	6	7	8	9	10	11	12	13	14	15	16	17	18	19	20	21	22	23	24	25	NCWTC	Pts	Ref
2011	Kyle Busch Motorsports	15	Toyota	DAY	PHO	DAR	MAR	NSH	DOV	CLT; 15	KAN	TEX	KEN	IOW	NSH	IRP	POC	MCH	BRI	ATL	CHI	NHA	KEN	LVS	TAL	MAR	TEX	HOM	81st	0^{1}	

^{1} Ineligible for series points.

=== Formula One records ===
Räikkönen holds the following Formula One records:

Record		Achieved	Ref
Most fastest laps in a season	10 (Note: Record shared with Michael Schumacher (2004).)	2005, 2008	
Most races between successive wins	114	2018 United States Grand Prix	
Most third places	45	2018 Brazilian Grand Prix	
Most podiums not starting from front row	72	2018 Brazilian Grand Prix	
Longest time between successive pole positions	3,262 days	2017 Monaco Grand Prix	
Most races between successive pole positions	168	2017 Monaco Grand Prix	

Footnotes

=== Formula One achievements ===
- The 2007 Chinese Grand Prix saw Räikkönen give Ferrari as a manufacturer their 200th win, as well as their 600th podium.
- The 2008 French Grand Prix saw Räikkönen give Ferrari as a manufacturer their 200th pole position.
- The 2016 Russian Grand Prix saw Räikkönen give Ferrari as a manufacturer their 700th podium.
- Räikkönen is the only driver to win in the V10, V8 and the V6 turbo hybrid engine eras.
- Räikkönen is the second driver to win the World Championship after being third in the drivers standings before the final race.
- Räikkönen is the third Ferrari driver to win the World Championship in their first year with the team, after Juan Manuel Fangio and Jody Scheckter.
- Räikkönen is the third Finnish driver to win the World Championship, after Keke Rosberg and Mika Häkkinen.
- Räikkönen is the only driver to win a Grand Prix for Lotus F1.
- As of 2025, Räikkönen is the latest Ferrari driver to win the World Championship.

== See also ==
- The "Flying Finns"
- The Unknown Kimi Raikkonen

== Bibliography ==
- Nevalainen, Petri (22 October 2008). Jäämies – Kimi Räikkösen henkilökuva [The Iceman – a portrait of Kimi Räikkönen] (in Finnish). Helsinki: Ajatus Kirjat. p. 224. ISBN 978-951-20-7805-9.
- Hotakainen, Kari (18 October 2018). The Unknown Kimi Raikkonen. Siltala Publishing. p. 320. ISBN 978-1471177668.
- Singh, A (6 April 2017). "Kimi Raikkonen: The Iceman Who Heats Up F1 Racing". TrendMantra. IN.

Sporting positions
Preceded by Antônio Pizzonia	Formula Renault UK; Champion; 2000	Succeeded by Carl Breeze
Preceded by Fernando Alonso	Formula One World Champion; 2007	Succeeded by Lewis Hamilton
Awards and achievements
Preceded by Michael Schumacher	Lorenzo Bandini Trophy; 2004	Succeeded by Fernando Alonso
Preceded by Jenson Button	Autosport Awards; International Driver of the Year; 2005	Succeeded by Fernando Alonso
Preceded by Inaugural	DHL Fastest Lap Award; 2007, 2008	Succeeded by Sebastian Vettel
Records
Preceded by Rubens Barrichello; 326 entries, 322 starts (1993–2011)	Most Grand Prix entries 353 entries, 349 starts (2001–2009, 2012–2021); 327th entry at the 2020 Portuguese GP; 323rd start at the 2020 Eifel GP	Succeeded by Fernando Alonso; 410 entries, 407 starts (2001, 2003–2018, 2021–2025)
Preceded by Rubens Barrichello; 260.395 km/h (161.802 mph) (2004 Italian GP)	Fastest Grand Prix qualifying lap 262.242 km/h (162.950 mph) (2018 Italian GP)	Succeeded by Lewis Hamilton; 264.362 km/h (164.267 mph) (2020 Italian GP)
