= 2005 German Grand Prix =

Coordinates: 49°19′40″N 8°33′57″E

Race 12 of 19 in the 2005 Formula One World Championship
← Previous race	Next race →

Race details
- Date: 24 July 2005
- Official name: Formula 1 Grosser Mobil 1 Preis von Deutschland 2005
- Location: Hockenheimring, Hockenheim, Germany
- Course: Permanent racing facility
- Course length: 4.574 km (2.842 miles)
- Distance: 67 laps, 306.458 km (190.424 miles)
- Weather: Cloudy with drizzle, but staying dry during the race. Air temp: 24°C.

Pole position
Driver	(Finland) Kimi Räikkönen	McLaren-Mercedes
- Time: 1:14.320

Fastest lap
Driver	(Finland) Kimi Räikkönen	McLaren-Mercedes
- Time: 1:14.873 on lap 24

Podium
First	(Spain) Fernando Alonso	Renault
Second	(Colombia) Juan Pablo Montoya	McLaren-Mercedes
Third	(United Kingdom) Jenson Button	BAR-Honda

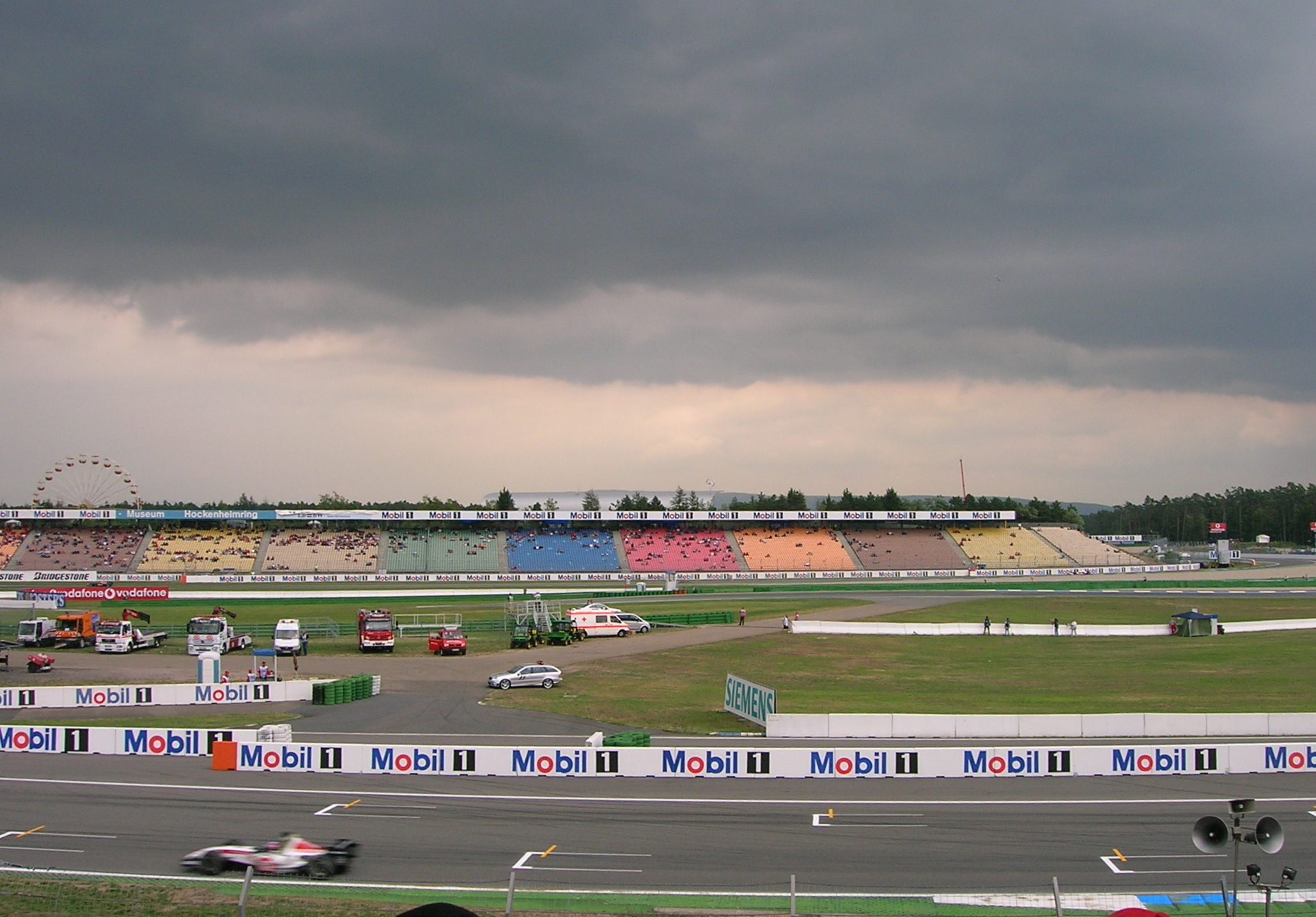
A BAR-Honda during Friday afternoon practice

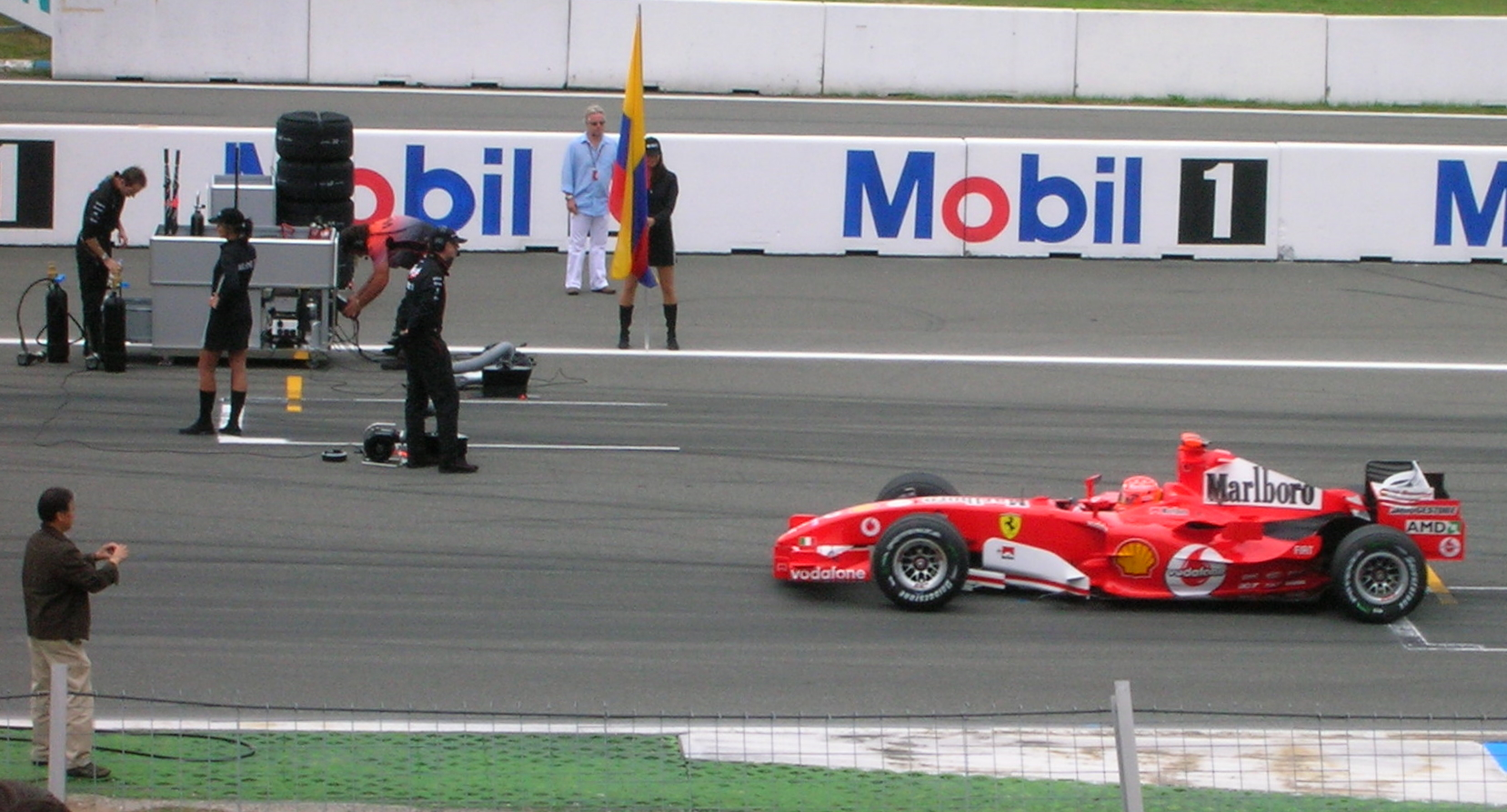
Michael Schumacher on his way to the grid

The 2005 German Grand Prix (officially the Formula 1 Grosser Mobil 1 Preis von Deutschland 2005) was a Formula One motor race held on 24 July 2005 in the Hockenheimring, Hockenheim, Germany at 14:00 CEST (UTC+2). The 67-lap race was the twelfth round of the 2005 Formula One season. Renault driver Fernando Alonso won the race, taking his sixth victory of the season, whilst Juan Pablo Montoya finished second for the McLaren team after starting from 19th place. BAR-Honda driver Jenson Button, completed the podium by finishing in third position. It was his first podium finish of the season, because the BAR team had been disqualified from the San Marino Grand Prix.

As a consequence of the race, Alonso extended his lead in the Drivers' Championship by 10 points to 36 points over his main title rival, McLaren driver Kimi Räikkönen, who had retired from the lead of the race, but still remained second in the standings. Ferrari driver and reigning world champion Michael Schumacher, finished the race in fifth position and retained third place in the standings, albeit being 40 points behind Alonso. Juan Pablo Montoya was still in fourth, and Rubens Barichello remained fifth despite finishing out of the points. In the Constructors' Championship, Renault extended their lead to 22 points from title rivals McLaren. McLaren increased the gap between themselves and third placed Ferrari to 17 points, whilst Toyota and Williams remained fourth and fifth respectively.

== Friday drivers ==
The bottom 6 teams in the 2004 Constructors' Championship were entitled to run a third car in free practice on Friday. These drivers drove on Friday but did not compete in qualifying or the race.

Constructor	Nat	Driver
McLaren-Mercedes	(Austria)	Alexander Wurz
Sauber-Petronas		-
Red Bull-Cosworth	(Italy)	Vitantonio Liuzzi
Toyota	(Brazil)	Ricardo Zonta
Jordan-Toyota	(Denmark)	Nicolas Kiesa
Minardi-Cosworth		-

== Report ==
Kimi Räikkönen qualified first and maintained this position after the start and first round of pitstops. Meanwhile, his teammate Juan Pablo Montoya, had gained nine positions in the first lap after he had failed to set a qualifying time and started last on the grid.

However, on lap 35, Räikkönen's car suffered a hydraulics failure forcing his retirement from the race. This meant that Fernando Alonso inherited first position. It was Räikkönen's fifth consecutive retirement at the circuit. Michael Schumacher and Rubens Barrichello suffered from the poor durability of the Bridgestone tyres on their Ferraris again, particularly Schumacher who had chosen a softer compound. This allowed Jenson Button to overtake Schumacher to take second place, although he quickly pitted, allowing Montoya take gain the position. Montoya then managed to stay ahead of Button after his own second stop. In the final laps of the race, Schumacher's problems allowed Giancarlo Fisichella to take his fourth place. During the race Jacques Villeneuve was in three separate collisions; he clashed with Barrichello on lap 1, Robert Doornbos on lap 4, and Tiago Monteiro on lap 27.

== Classification ==
=== Qualifying ===
Pos	No	Driver	Constructor	Lap	Gap	Grid
1	9	(Finland) Kimi Räikkönen	McLaren-Mercedes	1:14.320	-	1
2	3	(United Kingdom) Jenson Button	BAR-Honda	1:14.759	+0.439	2
3	5	(Spain) Fernando Alonso	Renault	1:14.904	+0.586	3
4	6	(Italy) Giancarlo Fisichella	Renault	1:14.927	+0.609	4
5	1	(Germany) Michael Schumacher	Ferrari	1:15.006	+0.688	5
6	7	(Australia) Mark Webber	Williams-BMW	1:15.070	+0.752	6
7	8	(Germany) Nick Heidfeld	Williams-BMW	1:15.403	+1.083	7
8	4	(Japan) Takuma Sato	BAR-Honda	1:15.501	+1.181	8
9	16	(Italy) Jarno Trulli	Toyota	1:15.532	+1.212	9
10	15	(Austria) Christian Klien	Red Bull-Cosworth	1:15.635	+1.315	10
11	14	(United Kingdom) David Coulthard	Red Bull-Cosworth	1:15.679	+1.359	11
12	17	(Germany) Ralf Schumacher	Toyota	1:15.689	+1.369	12
13	12	(Brazil) Felipe Massa	Sauber-Petronas	1:16.009	+1.691	13
14	11	(Canada) Jacques Villeneuve	Sauber-Petronas	1:16.012	+1.694	14
15	2	(Brazil) Rubens Barrichello	Ferrari	1:16.230	+1.910	15
16	21	(Netherlands) Christijan Albers	Minardi-Cosworth	1:17.519	+3.199	16
17	20	(Monaco) Robert Doornbos	Minardi-Cosworth	1:18.313	+3.993	17
18	18	(Portugal) Tiago Monteiro	Jordan-Toyota	1:18.599	+4.279	18
19	10	(Colombia) Juan Pablo Montoya	McLaren-Mercedes	No time^{1}		20^{3}
20	19	(India) Narain Karthikeyan	Jordan-Toyota	No time^{2}		19

Notes

- ^1 – Juan Pablo Montoya did not get time, after spinning off the track in the final corner.
- ^2 – Narain Karthikeyan did not get time, after making a couple of mistakes and decided to abort the attempt.
- ^3 – Juan Pablo Montoya received a 10-place grid penalty for an engine change.

=== Race ===
Pos	No	Driver	Constructor	Tyre	Laps	Time/Retired	Grid	Points
1	5	(Spain) Fernando Alonso	Renault	M	67	1:26:28.599	3	10
2	10	(Colombia) Juan Pablo Montoya	McLaren-Mercedes	M	67	+22.569	20	8
3	3	(United Kingdom) Jenson Button	BAR-Honda	M	67	+24.422	2	6
4	6	(Italy) Giancarlo Fisichella	Renault	M	67	+50.587	4	5
5	1	(Germany) Michael Schumacher	Ferrari	B	67	+51.690	5	4
6	17	(Germany) Ralf Schumacher	Toyota	M	67	+52.242	12	3
7	14	(United Kingdom) David Coulthard	Red Bull-Cosworth	M	67	+52.700	11	2
8	12	(Brazil) Felipe Massa	Sauber-Petronas	M	67	+56.570	13	1
9	15	(Austria) Christian Klien	Red Bull-Cosworth	M	67	+1:09.818	10	
10	2	(Brazil) Rubens Barrichello	Ferrari	B	66	+1 lap	15	
11	8	(Germany) Nick Heidfeld	Williams-BMW	M	66	+1 lap	7	
12	4	(Japan) Takuma Sato	BAR-Honda	M	66	+1 lap	8	
13	21	(Netherlands) Christijan Albers	Minardi-Cosworth	B	65	+2 laps	16	
14	16	(Italy) Jarno Trulli	Toyota	M	64	Engine	9	
15	11	(Canada) Jacques Villeneuve	Sauber-Petronas	M	64	+3 laps	14	
16	19	(India) Narain Karthikeyan	Jordan-Toyota	B	64	+3 laps	19	
17	18	(Portugal) Tiago Monteiro	Jordan-Toyota	B	64	+3 laps	18	
18	20	(Monaco) Robert Doornbos	Minardi-Cosworth	B	63	+4 laps	17	
NC	7	(Australia) Mark Webber	Williams-BMW	M	55	+12 laps	6	
Ret	9	(Finland) Kimi Räikkönen	McLaren-Mercedes	M	35	Hydraulics	1	

== Championship standings after the race ==
Drivers' Championship standings

	Pos	Driver	Points
	1	(Spain) Fernando Alonso	87
	2	(Finland) Kimi Räikkönen	51
	3	(Germany) Michael Schumacher	47
2	4	(Colombia) Juan Pablo Montoya	34
1	5	(Brazil) Rubens Barrichello	31

Constructors' Championship standings

Pos	Constructor	Points
1	(France) Renault	117
2	(United Kingdom) McLaren-Mercedes	95
3	(Italy) Ferrari	78
4	(Japan) Toyota	57
5	(United Kingdom) Williams-BMW	47

- Note: Only the top five positions are included for both sets of standings.

== See also ==
- 2005 Hockenheimring GP2 Series round

Previous race: 2005 British Grand Prix	FIA Formula One World Championship; 2005 season	Next race: 2005 Hungarian Grand Prix
Previous race: 2004 German Grand Prix	German Grand Prix	Next race: 2006 German Grand Prix
