= 2005 Bahrain Grand Prix =

Coordinates: 26°01′57″N 50°30′38″E

Race 3 of 19 in the 2005 Formula One World Championship
← Previous race	Next race →

Race details
- Date: April 3, 2005
- Official name: 2005 Formula 1 Gulf Air Bahrain Grand Prix
- Location: Bahrain International Circuit, Sakhir, Bahrain
- Course: Permanent racing facility
- Course length: 5.412 km (3.363 miles)
- Distance: 57 laps, 308.238 km (191.530 miles)
- Weather: Sunny, 42 °C (108 °F)
- Attendance: 77,257 (weekend)

Pole position
Driver	(Spain) Fernando Alonso	Renault
- Time: 3:01.902 (aggregate)

Fastest lap
Driver	(Spain) Pedro de la Rosa	McLaren-Mercedes
- Time: 1:31.447 on lap 43 (lap record)

Podium
First	(Spain) Fernando Alonso	Renault
Second	(Italy) Jarno Trulli	Toyota
Third	(Finland) Kimi Räikkönen	McLaren-Mercedes

The 2005 Bahrain Grand Prix (officially the 2005 Formula 1 Gulf Air Bahrain Grand Prix) was a Formula One motor race held on 3 April 2005 at the Bahrain International Circuit in Sakhir, Bahrain. The 57-lap race was the third round of the 2005 Formula One season and the second running of the Bahrain Grand Prix, since its inception the year before.

The race was won by polesitter and championship leader Fernando Alonso for the Renault team. Jarno Trulli finished in second place in a Toyota car and Kimi Räikkönen completed the podium in third position for McLaren. Defending World Champion Michael Schumacher having qualified in second place retired from the race early on driving Ferrari's new F2005 car which made its debut at this race. As a result the F2005 became the first new Ferrari Formula One chassis not to win on its debut since the F300 used in the 1998 season.

== Friday drivers ==
The bottom 6 teams in the 2004 Constructors' Championship were entitled to run a third car in free practice on Friday. These drivers drove on Friday but did not compete in qualifying or the race.

Constructor	No	Driver
McLaren-Mercedes	35	(Austria) Alexander Wurz
Sauber-Petronas		-
Red Bull-Cosworth	37	(Italy) Vitantonio Liuzzi
Toyota	38	(Brazil) Ricardo Zonta
Jordan-Toyota	39	(Monaco) Robert Doornbos
Minardi-Cosworth		-

== Report ==
=== Background ===
The race was only the second Formula One Grand Prix held in the Middle East, bringing the challenges of high temperatures and dusty conditions. This race also saw the Grand Prix debut of Scuderia Ferrari's new for 2005 car - the F2005. The race debut of the F2005 had originally not been expected to take place until the Spanish Grand Prix in May but following a team test at the Mugello Circuit the previous week the F2005's race debut was brought forward to the Bahrain event after what the team deemed an unsatisfactory performance at the first two races of the year in Australia and Malaysia with the F2004M, despite the fact Barrichello had scored a podium with second place in Melbourne. The race was held the day after Pope John Paul II died, with several teams and drivers offering their respects, most notably Ferrari, who raced with blackened nose cones as a mark of respect. The celebrations on the podium were also muted.

The circuit had been modified slightly from 2004, with turn 4 in particular being widened on the exit.

Before the race, McLaren driver Juan Pablo Montoya injured his shoulder. This led to him being replaced by Pedro de la Rosa at this race, and Alexander Wurz at the next one in San Marino, before his return at the Spanish Grand Prix.

=== Qualifying ===
First qualifying on Saturday resulted in few surprises– for the first few drivers, the circuit was still somewhat sandy, providing poor grip, while the later runners performed well, with Fernando Alonso taking provisional pole with a lap time of 1:29.848.

Final qualifying on Sunday morning again passed without major incident, with Alonso taking pole position, and Michael Schumacher taking second, driving the brand-new F2005 car. Rubens Barrichello, having had gearbox problems on Friday and Saturday, qualified 15th, and elected to change his engine, resulting in him starting from the back of the grid.

=== Race ===
Race afternoon brought the highest ever recorded temperatures experienced at a Grand Prix, with air temperature of 42.6 °C (108.7 °F) and track temperatures of 56 °C (133 °F). This surpassed the record temperatures of the 1955 Argentine Grand Prix and the 1984 Dallas Grand Prix. Christian Klien failed to get away from his seventh position on the grid for the formation lap. His car was pushed into the pits but could not be restarted, and he became the first of eight retirements.

The leaders made a clean start, with Alonso first to turn one. Schumacher moved from his second grid slot across to the clean side of the track, ahead of Jarno Trulli, who made a strong challenge to pass Schumacher in the first two corners, without success. Barrichello made an aggressive start, moving up to tenth by the end of lap one.

Giancarlo Fisichella's engine began to smoke during lap two, and he pulled into the pits to retire. However, as he applied the pit lane speed limiter, he felt power return, and was waved through by his team. But the resurgence was short-lived, and he was back in the pits on lap four to retire. On lap three, Narain Karthikeyan's car suffered an electrical failure that looked similar to Christian Klien's.

Schumacher continued to closely pursue Alonso until lap 12, when the world champion overshot turn nine, and performed a 270° turn in the run-off area. At the end of the lap, Schumacher coasted back to the pits, making this his first mechanical retirement since the 2001 German Grand Prix – a remarkable run of 58 consecutive Grands Prix. It later emerged that the car's hydraulics had failed, meaning he could not downshift to use engine braking for corners. Therefore, Trulli now took second place, 2.7 seconds behind Alonso, with Mark Webber in third.

On lap 18, Ralf Schumacher in fourth place made the first scheduled pit stop of the front-runners, and rejoined in 12th place. Alonso, Trulli and then Webber all pitted over the next few laps, in what appeared to be the now fairly standard three-stop pattern. After the pit stops, Alonso retained the lead, followed by Trulli, Webber, Kimi Räikkönen, Ralf, and Barrichello.

Nick Heidfeld was the next retirement, with a blown engine on lap 25, although it took him around half a lap to pull off the track to stop. He was shortly followed by Takuma Sato, whose front brakes had been smoking for a while, and who spun and then retired in the pits on lap 27. His teammate Jenson Button's brakes also appeared to be giving off more dust than usual, as Button fought to keep Pedro de la Rosa from taking his seventh place. De la Rosa was making his first start for McLaren, replacing the sidelined Juan Pablo Montoya. De la Rosa finally managed to pass Button on lap 33, outbraking him at turn one.

The following lap, Webber lost control out of turn eight, spun on the entrance to turn nine, and allowed Räikkönen and Ralf Schumacher to pass– on a circuit with very forgiving run-off areas, the spin upset the balance of Webber's car and flat-spotted his tyres.

In the next few laps, before the second pit stops, the closest fight was between Barrichello in sixth, and de la Rosa in seventh. De la Rosa continually pressured the remaining Ferrari, but initially he only succeeded in pushing himself too far, running wide at turn one, and allowing Button to close up behind him. Eventually, though, he was able to take sixth place in the final corner.

Alonso put in several fast laps to extend his lead, and pitted on lap 41. The other drivers also pitted without incident, except Button, who stalled his BAR-Honda. After several attempts at restarting the engine, he almost took his rear jack with him back into the race– only to retire at the end of the pit-lane due to a clutch failure, making this the second race in a row where both BAR drivers had retired. After the second round of pit stops, Alonso still led the race, followed by Trulli, Räikkönen, Ralf Schumacher, Webber, de la Rosa, Barrichello, and Felipe Massa.

In the closing stages, the main fight was between Webber and de la Rosa for fifth place. Webber defended strongly, but de la Rosa eventually overcame him two laps from the end of the race. Jacques Villeneuve retired from ninth place into the pits on the penultimate lap, while Barrichello slipped further and further back, allowing Massa to take seventh place and score points in his Sauber team's 200th Grand Prix, and David Coulthard took eighth place on the last lap, making Ferrari scoreless for the first time since the 2003 Brazilian Grand Prix.

Alonso won the race by a comfortable 13.4 seconds from Trulli, bringing Renault engines their 100th World Championship Grand Prix win.

== Classification ==
=== Qualifying ===
Pos	No	Driver	Constructor	Q1	Q2	Total	Gap	Grid
1	5	(Spain) Fernando Alonso	Renault	1:29.848	1:32.054	3:01.902		1
2	1	(Germany) Michael Schumacher	Ferrari	1:30.237	1:32.120	3:02.357	+ 0.455	2
3	16	(Italy) Jarno Trulli	Toyota	1:29.993	1:32.667	3:02.660	+ 0.758	3
4	8	(Germany) Nick Heidfeld	Williams-BMW	1:30.390	1:32.827	3:03.217	+ 1.315	4
5	7	(Australia) Mark Webber	Williams-BMW	1:30.592	1:32.670	3:03.262	+ 1.360	5
6	17	(Germany) Ralf Schumacher	Toyota	1:30.952	1:32.319	3:03.271	+ 1.369	6
7	15	(Austria) Christian Klien	Red Bull-Cosworth	1:30.646	1:32.723	3:03.369	+ 1.467	7
8	10	(Spain) Pedro de la Rosa	McLaren-Mercedes	1:30.725	1:32.648	3:03.373	+ 1.471	8
9	9	(Finland) Kimi Räikkönen	McLaren-Mercedes	1:30.594	1:32.930	3:03.524	+ 1.622	9
10	6	(Italy) Giancarlo Fisichella	Renault	1:30.445	1:33.320	3:03.765	+ 1.863	10
11	3	(United Kingdom) Jenson Button	BAR-Honda	1:30.957	1:33.319	3:04.348	+ 2.446	11
12	12	(Brazil) Felipe Massa	Sauber-Petronas	1:30.933	1:34.269	3:05.202	+ 3.300	12
13	4	(Japan) Takuma Sato	BAR-Honda	1:31.113	1:34.450	3:05.563	+ 3.661	13
14	14	(United Kingdom) David Coulthard	Red Bull-Cosworth	1:31.211	1:34.633	3:05.844	+ 3.942	14
15	2	(Brazil) Rubens Barrichello	Ferrari	1:31.826	1:35.867	3:07.693	+ 5.791	20^{1}
16	11	(Canada) Jacques Villeneuve	Sauber-Petronas	1:32.318	1:35.665	3:07.983	+ 6.081	15
17	18	(Portugal) Tiago Monteiro	Jordan-Toyota	1:33.424	1:36.004	3:09.428	+ 7.526	16
18	19	(India) Narain Karthikeyan	Jordan-Toyota	1:33.190	1:36.953	3:10.143	+ 8.241	17
19	21	(Netherlands) Christijan Albers	Minardi-Cosworth	1:34.005	1:36.417	3:10.422	+ 8.520	18^{2}
20	20	(Austria) Patrick Friesacher	Minardi-Cosworth	1:34.848	1:36.413	3:11.261	+ 9.359	19^{2}

Notes

- ^1 – Rubens Barrichello started from the back of the grid due to an engine change in parc fermé.
- ^2 – Christijan Albers and Patrick Friesacher received a 10-place grid penalty for engine changes.

=== Race ===
Pos	No	Driver	Constructor	Tyre	Laps	Time/Retired	Grid	Points
1	5	(Spain) Fernando Alonso	Renault	MI	57	1:29:18.531	1	10
2	16	(Italy) Jarno Trulli	Toyota	MI	57	+13.409	3	8
3	9	(Finland) Kimi Räikkönen	McLaren-Mercedes	MI	57	+32.063	9	6
4	17	(Germany) Ralf Schumacher	Toyota	MI	57	+53.272	6	5
5	10	(Spain) Pedro de la Rosa	McLaren-Mercedes	MI	57	+1:04.988	8	4
6	7	(Australia) Mark Webber	Williams-BMW	MI	57	+1:14.701	5	3
7	12	(Brazil) Felipe Massa	Sauber-Petronas	MI	56	+1 lap	12	2
8	14	(United Kingdom) David Coulthard	Red Bull-Cosworth	MI	56	+1 lap	14	1
9	2	(Brazil) Rubens Barrichello	Ferrari	B	56	+1 lap	20	
10	18	(Portugal) Tiago Monteiro	Jordan-Toyota	B	55	+2 laps	16	
11	11	(Canada) Jacques Villeneuve	Sauber-Petronas	MI	54	Suspension	15	
12	20	(Austria) Patrick Friesacher	Minardi-Cosworth	B	54	+3 laps	19	
13	21	(Netherlands) Christijan Albers	Minardi-Cosworth	B	53	+4 laps	18	
Ret	3	(United Kingdom) Jenson Button	BAR-Honda	MI	46	Clutch	11	
Ret	4	(Japan) Takuma Sato	BAR-Honda	MI	27	Brakes	13	
Ret	8	(Germany) Nick Heidfeld	Williams-BMW	MI	25	Engine	4	
Ret	1	(Germany) Michael Schumacher	Ferrari	B	12	Hydraulics	2	
Ret	6	(Italy) Giancarlo Fisichella	Renault	MI	4	Engine	10	
Ret	19	(India) Narain Karthikeyan	Jordan-Toyota	B	2	Electrical	17	
DNS	15	(Austria) Christian Klien	Red Bull-Cosworth	MI	0	Electrical	7	

== Championship standings after the race ==
Drivers' Championship standings

	Pos.	Driver	Points
	1	(Spain) Fernando Alonso	26
1	2	(Italy) Jarno Trulli	16
1	3	(Italy) Giancarlo Fisichella	10
4	4	(Germany) Ralf Schumacher	9
	5	(United Kingdom) David Coulthard	9

Constructors' Championship standings

	Pos.	Constructor	Points
	1	(France) Renault	36
	2	(Japan) Toyota	25
3	3	(United Kingdom) McLaren-Mercedes	19
1	4	(United Kingdom) Williams-BMW	13
2	5	(United Kingdom) Red Bull-Cosworth	12

- Note: Only the top five positions are included for both sets of standings.

Previous race: 2005 Malaysian Grand Prix	FIA Formula One World Championship; 2005 season	Next race: 2005 San Marino Grand Prix
Previous race: 2004 Bahrain Grand Prix	Bahrain Grand Prix	Next race: 2006 Bahrain Grand Prix
