= 2005 British Grand Prix =

Coordinates: 52°04′43″N 1°01′01″W

Race 11 of 19 in the 2005 Formula One World Championship
← Previous race	Next race →
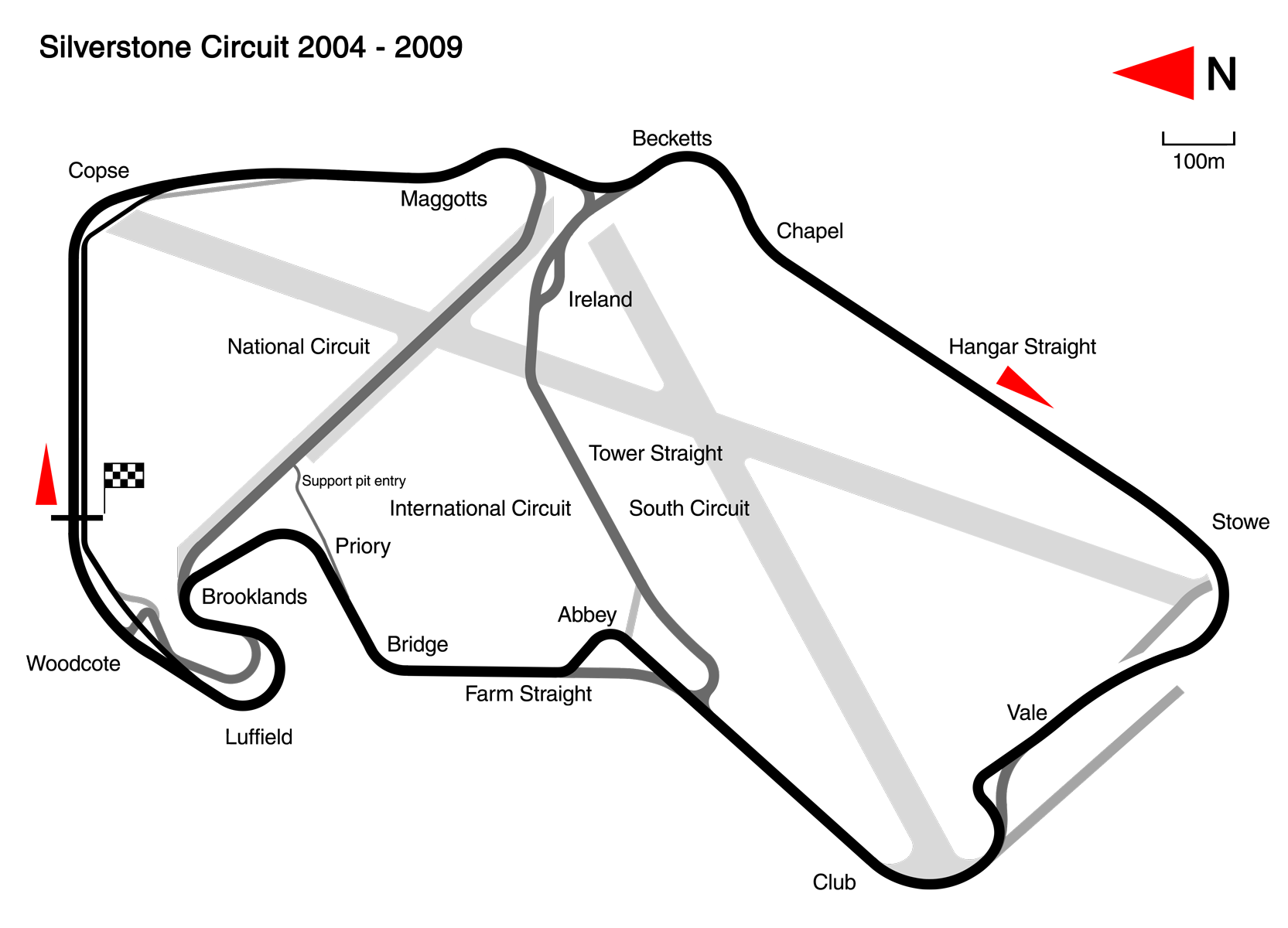

Race details
- Date: 10 July 2005
- Official name: 2005 Formula 1 Foster's British Grand Prix
- Location: Silverstone Circuit, Northamptonshire and Buckinghamshire, England
- Course: Permanent racing facility
- Course length: 5.141 km (3.194 miles)
- Distance: 60 laps, 308.46 km (191.64 miles)
- Weather: Sunny, Air: 27 °C (81 °F), Track 47 °C (117 °F)

Pole position
Driver	(Spain) Fernando Alonso	Renault
- Time: 1:19.905

Fastest lap
Driver	(Finland) Kimi Räikkönen	McLaren-Mercedes
- Time: 1:20.502 on lap 60

Podium
First	(Colombia) Juan Pablo Montoya	McLaren-Mercedes
Second	(Spain) Fernando Alonso	Renault
Third	(Finland) Kimi Räikkönen	McLaren-Mercedes

The 2005 British Grand Prix (officially the 2005 Formula 1 Foster's British Grand Prix) was a Formula One race held in Silverstone Circuit on 10 July 2005 at 13:00 BST (UTC+1). It was the eleventh race of the 2005 Formula One World Championship and the last race for then Minardi driver Patrick Friesacher.

== Friday drivers ==
The bottom 6 teams in the 2004 Constructors' Championship were entitled to run a third car in free practice on Friday. These drivers drove on Friday but did not compete in qualifying or the race.

Constructor	Nat	Driver
McLaren-Mercedes	(Spain)	Pedro de la Rosa
Sauber-Petronas		-
Red Bull-Cosworth	(Italy)	Vitantonio Liuzzi
Toyota	(Brazil)	Ricardo Zonta
Jordan-Toyota	(Monaco)	Robert Doornbos
Minardi-Cosworth		-

== Report ==
=== Qualifying ===
For the second consecutive race, Renault's Fernando Alonso took pole position while his championship rival, McLaren's Kimi Räikkönen, was demoted ten places on the grid following an engine failure. Räikkönen, who had originally qualified second with a time just 0.027 seconds slower than Alonso's, suffered this engine failure during Saturday free practice. This promoted BAR's Jenson Button, in his home race, to the front row, with the top ten being completed by Juan Pablo Montoya in the second McLaren, Jarno Trulli in the Toyota, Rubens Barrichello in the Ferrari, Giancarlo Fisichella in the second Renault, Takuma Sato in the second BAR, Ralf Schumacher in the second Toyota, Michael Schumacher in the second Ferrari, and Jacques Villeneuve in the Sauber. Jordan's Tiago Monteiro started at the rear of the grid after failing to set a time, following an engine failure during Friday practice.

=== Race ===
Before the race, a minute of silence was held as a mark of respect for those who had lost their lives in the London bombings three days earlier. Daily Express reporter Bob McKenzie honored the pledge to run naked around the Silverstone track if McLaren won the race in 2004. McLaren boss Ron Dennis sent McKenzie on his way two hours before the start of the race. He arrived at the finish line 36 minutes later after honouring his promise wearing nothing more than silver body paint and a sporran. McKenzie's run raised money for charity.

The weather was hot, with air temperature at 30 °C, and the track temperature at 45 °C as the cars completed the formation lap. Sato stalled as he came to the grid, after he had mistakenly pressed the kill switch on his steering wheel, but race director Charlie Whiting nonetheless started the race, with the safety car being deployed on lap 2 to allow the marshals to safely return the BAR to the pit lane. Sato would eventually rejoin the race, two laps behind the leaders. Montoya made a fast start, passing Button off the grid and then overtaking Alonso for the lead into Becketts. After the safety car period, Montoya retained the lead until the first round of pit stops, although Alonso remained no more than a second and a half behind as he and the Colombian traded fastest laps. Button held third, while Barrichello and Fisichella passed a slow-starting Trulli, who in turn was holding up Michael Schumacher. Räikkönen, already up four places, was thus able to close up behind Schumacher and Trulli, but was unable to overtake them until the pit stops.

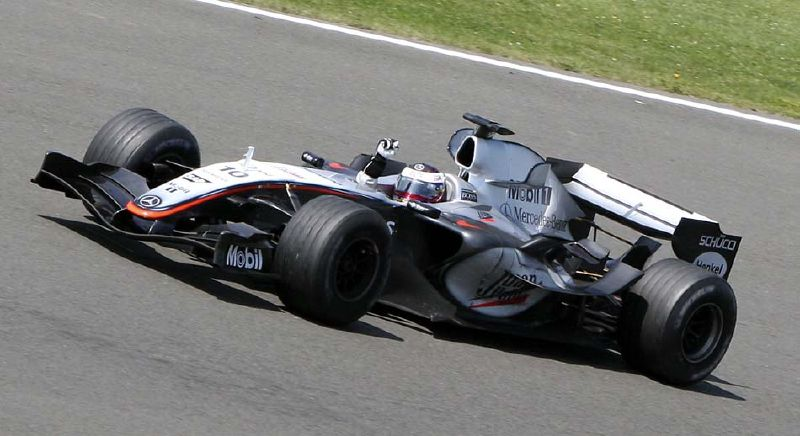
The race was won by Juan Pablo Montoya, his first victory for McLaren.

Montoya made his first pit stop on lap 21, a lap earlier than planned due to traffic. Alonso followed on lap 23, rejoining the race almost side-by-side with Montoya, who again held his line. Fisichella led for the next two laps, setting the fastest lap in the process, before making his first stop. On lap 28, with every driver except Sato having pitted, Montoya led Alonso by three seconds, followed by Fisichella, Button, Barrichello, Räikkönen, Michael Schumacher and Trulli.

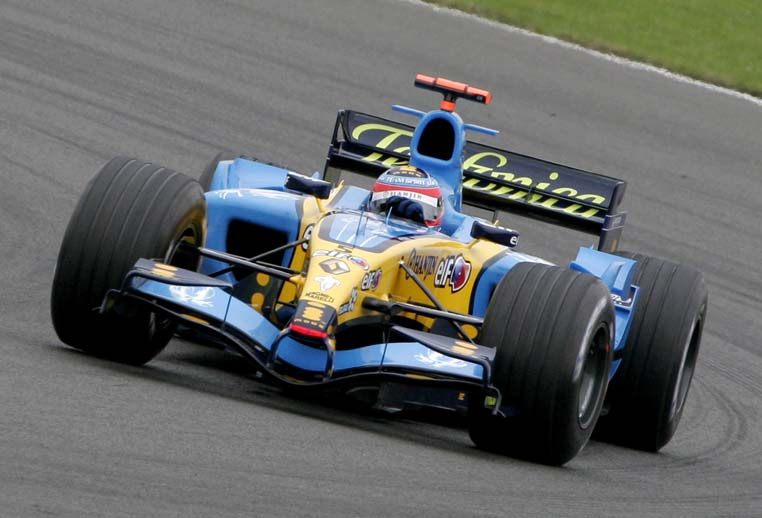
Fernando Alonso took pole position, but had to give best to Montoya in the race.

On lap 32 Barrichello, on a three-stop strategy, made his second stop. This enabled Räikkönen, now the fastest man on the track, to close up behind Button. Montoya responded to his team-mate's pace, and to Alonso, by setting back-to-back fastest laps on laps 40 and 41, increasing his lead over the Spaniard to over six seconds. On lap 43, Räikkönen took fourth when Button made his second stop, easily retaining this position after his own stop two laps later. Montoya pitted on lap 44, putting Alonso back in front, before Barrichello made his third stop on lap 45. On lap 46 Fisichella, on course for his first podium since winning the opening race of the season in Australia, made his second stop, but stalled as he tried to leave the pits, promoting Räikkönen to third.

Alonso led for five laps before pitting on lap 49, but lost time trying to lap Trulli. This meant that he did not have a big enough lead to make his stop and rejoin the race in front of Montoya, though he was comfortably ahead of Räikkönen. In the end, the Colombian took his first win for McLaren by 2.7 seconds.

Räikkönen set the fastest race lap on the final lap to finish less than 12 seconds behind Alonso, while Fisichella ended up 3.5 seconds behind the Finn. Button finished a distant fifth, ahead of Michael Schumacher and Barrichello, while Ralf Schumacher edged out Toyota team-mate Trulli for the final point.

There was only one retirement in the race, Jordan's Narain Karthikeyan dropping out on lap 11 with an electrical failure.

The result allowed Alonso to increase his lead over Räikkönen in the Drivers' Championship by two points, 77 to 51. Michael Schumacher remained in third on 43 points, while Montoya moved up to sixth with 26. In the Constructors' Championship, McLaren reduced the deficit to Renault by three points, 102 to 87, Ferrari remaining in third on 74.

After the podium ceremony, Montoya, Alonso and Räikkönen did not pop the champagne bottles out of respect for the victims of London bombings.

== Classification ==
=== Qualifying ===
Pos	No	Driver	Constructor	Lap	Gap	Grid
1	5	(Spain) Fernando Alonso	Renault	1:19.905	—	1
2	9	(Finland) Kimi Räikkönen	McLaren-Mercedes	1:19.932	+0.027	12^{1}
3	3	(United Kingdom) Jenson Button	BAR-Honda	1:20.207	+0.302	2
4	10	(Colombia) Juan Pablo Montoya	McLaren-Mercedes	1:20.382	+0.477	3
5	16	(Italy) Jarno Trulli	Toyota	1:20.459	+0.554	4
6	2	(Brazil) Rubens Barrichello	Ferrari	1:20.906	+1.001	5
7	6	(Italy) Giancarlo Fisichella	Renault	1:21.010	+1.105	6
8	4	(Japan) Takuma Sato	BAR-Honda	1:21.114	+1.209	7
9	17	(Germany) Ralf Schumacher	Toyota	1:21.191	+1.286	8
10	1	(Germany) Michael Schumacher	Ferrari	1:21.275	+1.370	9
11	11	(Canada) Jacques Villeneuve	Sauber-Petronas	1:21.352	+1.447	10
12	7	(Australia) Mark Webber	Williams-BMW	1:21.997	+2.092	11
13	14	(United Kingdom) David Coulthard	Red Bull-Cosworth	1:22.108	+2.203	13
14	8	(Germany) Nick Heidfeld	Williams-BMW	1:22.117	+2.212	14
15	15	(Austria) Christian Klien	Red Bull-Cosworth	1:22.207	+2.302	15
16	12	(Brazil) Felipe Massa	Sauber-Petronas	1:22.495	+2.590	16
17	19	(India) Narain Karthikeyan	Jordan-Toyota	1:23.583	+3.678	17
18	21	(Netherlands) Christijan Albers	Minardi-Cosworth	1:24.576	+4.671	18
19	20	(Austria) Patrick Friesacher	Minardi-Cosworth	1:25.566	+5.661	19
20	18	(Portugal) Tiago Monteiro	Jordan-Toyota	No time^{2}		20^{2}

Notes

- ^1 – For the second race in a row, Kimi Räikkönen received a ten-position grid penalty for an engine change.
- ^2 – Tiago Monteiro did not complete a qualifying lap, having already received a ten-position grid penalty for an engine change.

=== Race ===
Pos	No	Driver	Constructor	Tyre	Laps	Time/Retired	Grid	Points
1	10	(Colombia) Juan Pablo Montoya	McLaren-Mercedes	M	60	1:24:29.588	3	10
2	5	(Spain) Fernando Alonso	Renault	M	60	+2.739	1	8
3	9	(Finland) Kimi Räikkönen	McLaren-Mercedes	M	60	+14.436	12	6
4	6	(Italy) Giancarlo Fisichella	Renault	M	60	+17.914	6	5
5	3	(United Kingdom) Jenson Button	BAR-Honda	M	60	+40.264	2	4
6	1	(Germany) Michael Schumacher	Ferrari	B	60	+1:15.322	9	3
7	2	(Brazil) Rubens Barrichello	Ferrari	B	60	+1:16.567	5	2
8	17	(Germany) Ralf Schumacher	Toyota	M	60	+1:19.212	8	1
9	16	(Italy) Jarno Trulli	Toyota	M	60	+1:20.851	4	
10	12	(Brazil) Felipe Massa	Sauber-Petronas	M	59	+1 Lap	16	
11	7	(Australia) Mark Webber	Williams-BMW	M	59	+1 Lap	11	
12	8	(Germany) Nick Heidfeld	Williams-BMW	M	59	+1 Lap	14	
13	14	(United Kingdom) David Coulthard	Red Bull-Cosworth	M	59	+1 Lap	13	
14	11	(Canada) Jacques Villeneuve	Sauber-Petronas	M	59	+1 Lap	10	
15	15	(Austria) Christian Klien	Red Bull-Cosworth	M	59	+1 Lap	15	
16	4	(Japan) Takuma Sato	BAR-Honda	M	58	+2 Laps	PL^{3}	
17	18	(Portugal) Tiago Monteiro	Jordan-Toyota	B	58	+2 Laps	20	
18	21	(Netherlands) Christijan Albers	Minardi-Cosworth	B	57	+3 Laps	18	
19	20	(Austria) Patrick Friesacher	Minardi-Cosworth	B	56	+4 Laps	19	
Ret	19	(India) Narain Karthikeyan	Jordan-Toyota	B	10	Electrical	17	

Notes

- ^3 – Takuma Sato started the race from the pitlane.

== Championship standings after the race ==
- **Bold text** indicates who still has a theoretical chance of becoming World Champion.

Drivers' Championship standings

	Pos	Driver	Points
	1	(Spain) **Fernando Alonso**	77
	2	(Finland) **Kimi Räikkönen**	51
	3	(Germany) **Michael Schumacher**	43
1	4	(Brazil) **Rubens Barrichello**	31
1	5	(Italy) **Jarno Trulli**	31

Constructors' Championship standings

Pos	Constructor	Points
1	(France) **Renault**	102
2	(United Kingdom) **McLaren-Mercedes**	87
3	(Italy) **Ferrari**	74
4	(Japan) **Toyota**	54
5	(United Kingdom) **Williams-BMW**	47

- Note: Only the top five positions are included for both sets of standings.

== See also ==
- 2005 Silverstone GP2 Series round

Previous race: 2005 French Grand Prix	FIA Formula One World Championship; 2005 season	Next race: 2005 German Grand Prix
Previous race: 2004 British Grand Prix	British Grand Prix	Next race: 2006 British Grand Prix
