= 2005 Formula One World Championship =

59th season of FIA Formula One motor racing

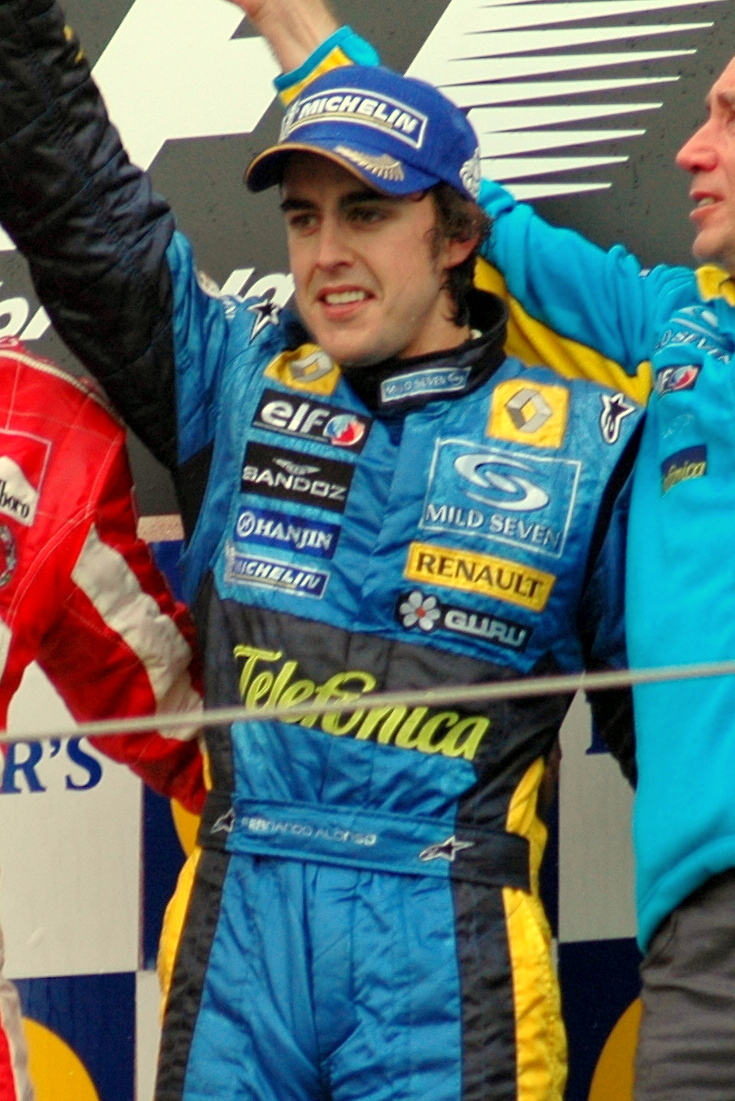
Fernando Alonso won his first Drivers' Championship, scoring 133 points with Renault.

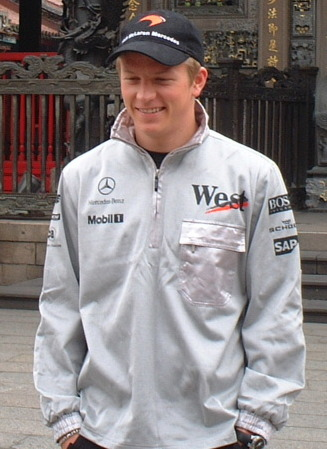
McLaren's Kimi Räikkönen (pictured in 2002) finished second, 21 points adrift of Alonso.

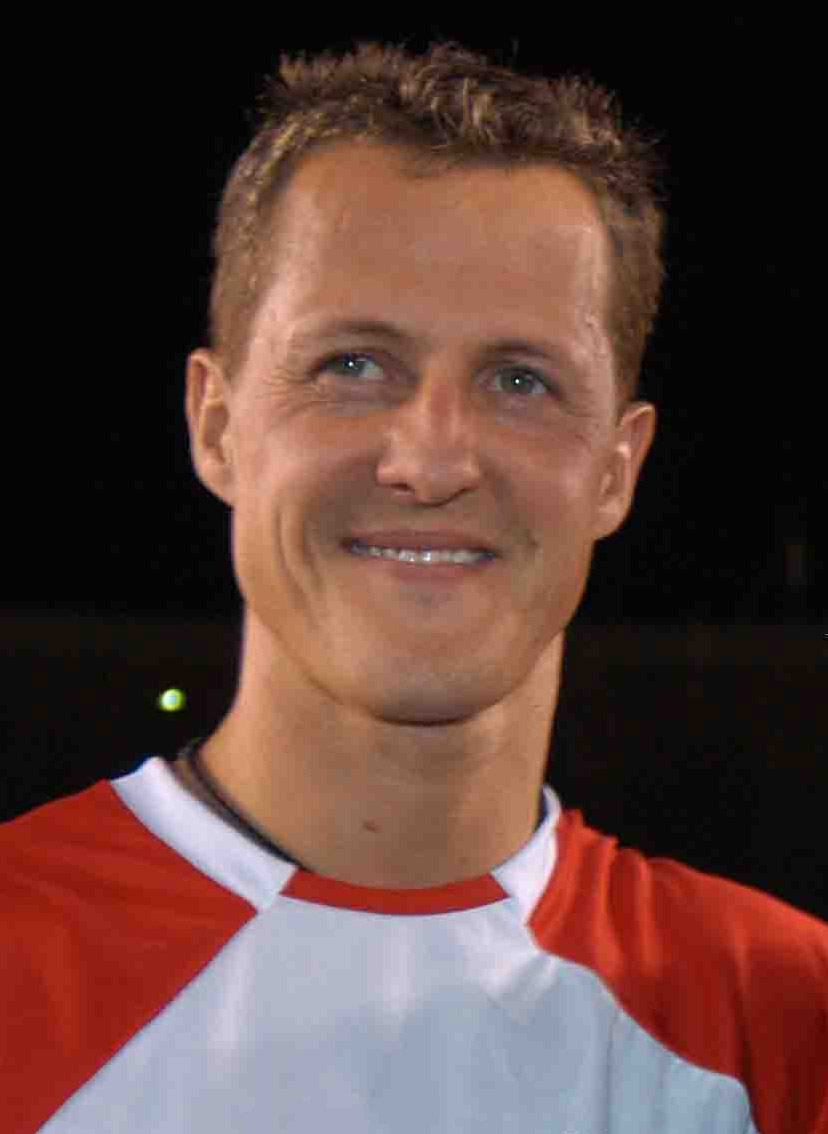
Seven-time defending champion Michael Schumacher finished third for Ferrari after winning the last five straight championships.

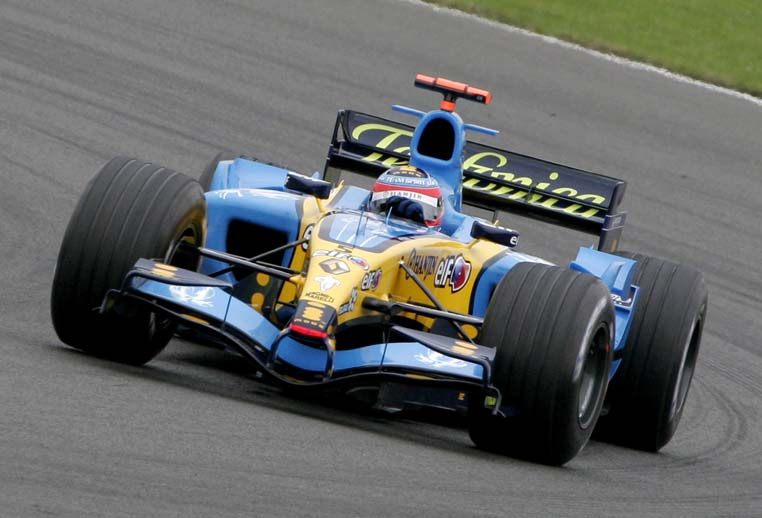
Renault won the World Constructors' Championship with the R25.

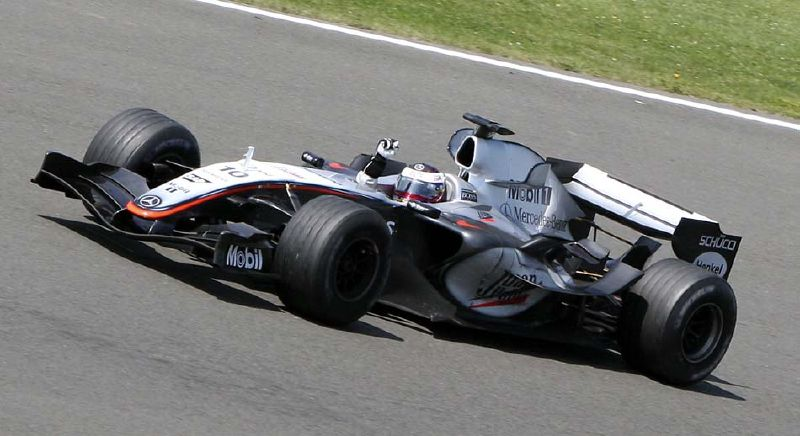
McLaren placed second in the Constructors' Championship with the MP4-20.

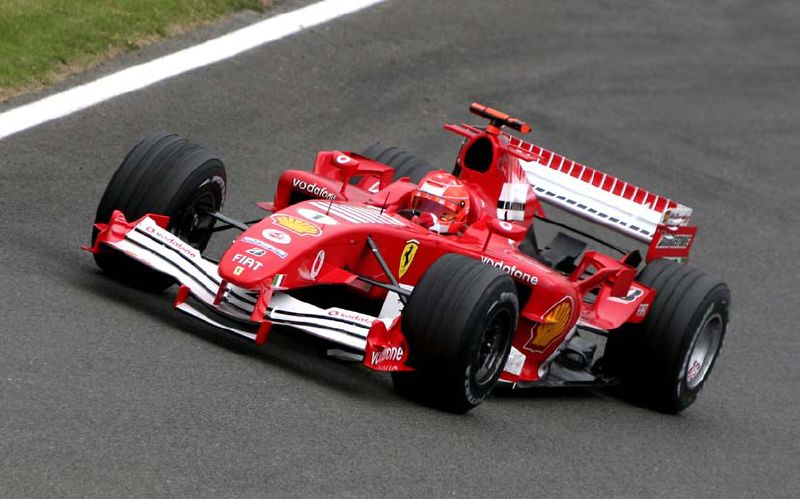
Ferrari finished third in the championship with the F2005, having won the last six titles as a constructor.

The 2005 FIA Formula One World Championship was the 59th season of FIA Formula One motor racing. It featured the 56th FIA Formula One World Championship, contested over a then-record 19 Grands Prix. It commenced on 6 March 2005 and ended 16 October.

Fernando Alonso and the Renault team won the World Drivers' and World Constructors' championships, ending five years of dominance by Michael Schumacher and Ferrari since 2000 and also ending nine years of Ferrari, McLaren and Williams dominance triopoly since 1996. Alonso's success made him the youngest champion in the history of the sport, a title he held until Lewis Hamilton's 2008 title success. Renault's win was their first as a constructor. Alonso started the season off strongly, winning three of the first four races and his title success was in little doubt. He sealed the title in Brazil with two races left after a controlled third-place finish. Alonso's championship was also the first for a Renault-powered driver since Jacques Villeneuve's championship in 1997.

Alonso and Renault had to contend with the pace of the resurgent McLaren team with lead driver Kimi Räikkönen outshining teammate Juan Pablo Montoya, who came highly regarded from his time at Williams. Räikkönen won seven races like Alonso but would have won more if not for a series of reliability issues, resulting in qualifying engine change penalties and retirements from the lead on three occasions. Nevertheless, Räikkönen grabbed the headlines winning from near the back of the grid in Japan, passing Alonso's Renault teammate Giancarlo Fisichella on the final lap. Reigning champions Michael Schumacher and Ferrari had a poor season by their standards, with Bridgestone unable to compete with Michelin after the tyre-change ban that only affected the 2005 season. Their only win came when Michelin deemed their own tyres unsafe after several incidents in the oval turn at Indianapolis. As a result, only the six Bridgestone cars took part. Schumacher just held on for third in the Drivers' Championship, in spite of the superior pace of McLaren, underlining the disappointing season Montoya had. The Colombian missed two races early on due to a tennis injury. He then won three races, showing glimpses of pace, but was well beaten by his teammate Räikkönen in the championship.

The 2005 season was the last before the Minardi, BAR and Jordan teams were taken over by new owners and changed names to Toro Rosso, Honda, and Midland respectively in the 2006 season. The former Jaguar team was sold from Ford to Red Bull GmbH and made its debut as Red Bull Racing during the 2005 season.

== Teams and drivers ==
The following teams and drivers were competitors in the 2005 FIA Formula One World Championship.

Entrant	Constructor	Chassis	Engine^{†}	Tyre	No.	Driver	Rounds
(Italy) Scuderia Ferrari Marlboro	Ferrari	F2004M; F2005	Ferrari Tipo 053; Ferrari Tipo 055	B	1	(Germany) Michael Schumacher	All
(Italy) Scuderia Ferrari Marlboro	Ferrari	F2004M; F2005	Ferrari Tipo 053; Ferrari Tipo 055	B	2	(Brazil) Rubens Barrichello	All
(United Kingdom) Lucky Strike BAR Honda	BAR-Honda	007	Honda RA005E	M	3	(United Kingdom) Jenson Button	1–4, 7–19
(United Kingdom) Lucky Strike BAR Honda	BAR-Honda	007	Honda RA005E	M	4	(Japan) Takuma Sato (Note: Takuma Sato was entered into the Malaysian Grand Prix, but later withdrew due to illness.)	1–4, 7–19
(United Kingdom) Lucky Strike BAR Honda	BAR-Honda	007	Honda RA005E	M	4	(United Kingdom) Anthony Davidson	2
(France) Mild Seven Renault F1 Team	Renault	R25	Renault RS25	M	5	(Spain) Fernando Alonso	All
(France) Mild Seven Renault F1 Team	Renault	R25	Renault RS25	M	6	(Italy) Giancarlo Fisichella	All
(United Kingdom) BMW WilliamsF1 Team	Williams-BMW	FW27	BMW P84/5	M	7	(Australia) Mark Webber	All
(United Kingdom) BMW WilliamsF1 Team	Williams-BMW	FW27	BMW P84/5	M	8	(Germany) Nick Heidfeld (Note: Nick Heidfeld was entered into the Italian Grand Prix, but later withdrew due to illness.)	1–15
(United Kingdom) BMW WilliamsF1 Team	Williams-BMW	FW27	BMW P84/5	M	8	(Brazil) Antônio Pizzonia	15–19
(United Kingdom) Team McLaren Mercedes (Note: McLaren entered first twelve Grands Prix as "West McLaren Mercedes".)	McLaren-Mercedes	MP4-20	Mercedes FO110R	M	9	(Finland) Kimi Räikkönen	All
(United Kingdom) Team McLaren Mercedes	McLaren-Mercedes	MP4-20	Mercedes FO110R	M	10	(Colombia) Juan Pablo Montoya	1–2, 5–19
(United Kingdom) Team McLaren Mercedes	McLaren-Mercedes	MP4-20	Mercedes FO110R	M	10	(Spain) Pedro de la Rosa	3
(United Kingdom) Team McLaren Mercedes	McLaren-Mercedes	MP4-20	Mercedes FO110R	M	10	(Austria) Alexander Wurz	4
(Switzerland) Sauber Petronas	Sauber-Petronas	C24	Petronas 05A	M	11	(Canada) Jacques Villeneuve	All
(Switzerland) Sauber Petronas	Sauber-Petronas	C24	Petronas 05A	M	12	(Brazil) Felipe Massa	All
(United Kingdom) Red Bull Racing (Note: Red Bull competed under a British licence.)	Red Bull-Cosworth	RB1	Cosworth TJ2005	M	14	(United Kingdom) David Coulthard	All
(United Kingdom) Red Bull Racing	Red Bull-Cosworth	RB1	Cosworth TJ2005	M	15	(Austria) Christian Klien	1–3, 8–19
(United Kingdom) Red Bull Racing	Red Bull-Cosworth	RB1	Cosworth TJ2005	M	15	(Italy) Vitantonio Liuzzi	4–7
(Japan) Panasonic Toyota Racing	Toyota	TF105; TF105B	Toyota RVX-05	M	16	(Italy) Jarno Trulli	All
(Japan) Panasonic Toyota Racing	Toyota	TF105; TF105B	Toyota RVX-05	M	17	(Germany) Ralf Schumacher (Note: Ralf Schumacher was entered into the United States Grand Prix, but later withdrew after he was injured during free practice.)	All
(Japan) Panasonic Toyota Racing	Toyota	TF105; TF105B	Toyota RVX-05	M	17	(Brazil) Ricardo Zonta	9
(Republic of Ireland) Jordan Grand Prix	Jordan-Toyota	EJ15; EJ15B	Toyota RVX-05	B	18	(Portugal) Tiago Monteiro	All
(Republic of Ireland) Jordan Grand Prix	Jordan-Toyota	EJ15; EJ15B	Toyota RVX-05	B	19	(India) Narain Karthikeyan	All
(Italy) Minardi F1 Team	Minardi-Cosworth	PS04B; PS05	Cosworth CK2004 (Note: Minardi used the CK2004 (CR-3L) engine during the first 3 races.); Cosworth TJ2005	B	20	(Austria) Patrick Friesacher	1–11
(Italy) Minardi F1 Team	Minardi-Cosworth	PS04B; PS05	Cosworth CK2004; Cosworth TJ2005	B	20	(Monaco) Robert Doornbos (Note: Despite being Dutch, Doornbos raced under the flag of Monaco for the 2005 season.)	12–19
(Italy) Minardi F1 Team	Minardi-Cosworth	PS04B; PS05	Cosworth CK2004; Cosworth TJ2005	B	21	(Netherlands) Christijan Albers	All
Sources:

- ^{†} All engines were 3.0-litre, V10 configuration. 2005 was the final year of this engine formula.
- No Michelin-shod cars participated in the United States Grand Prix for safety reasons, leaving just six cars on the grid at the start of the race.

=== Free practice drivers ===
Five constructors entered free practice only drivers over the course of the season. Sauber Petronas were also eligible to enter a free practice driver, but elected not to do so.

Drivers that took part in free practice sessions
Constructor	Practice drivers		
Constructor	No.	Driver name	Rounds
McLaren–Mercedes	35	(Spain) Pedro de la Rosa (Austria) Alexander Wurz	1–2, 4–5, 8–11, 14–15, 18–19; 3, 6–7, 12–13, 16–17
Red Bull–Cosworth	37	(Italy) Vitantonio Liuzzi (Austria) Christian Klien (United States) Scott Speed	1–3, 10–19; 4–7; 8–9
Toyota	38	(Brazil) Ricardo Zonta (France) Olivier Panis	1–9, 11–19; 10
Jordan–Toyota	39	(Monaco) Robert Doornbos (France) Franck Montagny (Denmark) Nicolas Kiesa (Japan) Sakon Yamamoto	1–6, 9–11; 7; 12–17, 19; 18
Minardi–Cosworth	40	(Israel) Chanoch Nissany (Italy) Enrico Toccacelo	13; 14–16

- Enrico Toccacelo, Minardi's third driver was not present in Brazil as he competed for the Italian team in the opening round of the A1 Grand Prix series at Brands Hatch.
- Robert Kubica was due to drive Minardi's third car at the Japanese or Chinese GPs, but he did not get the FIA Super License required to drive.

=== Team changes ===
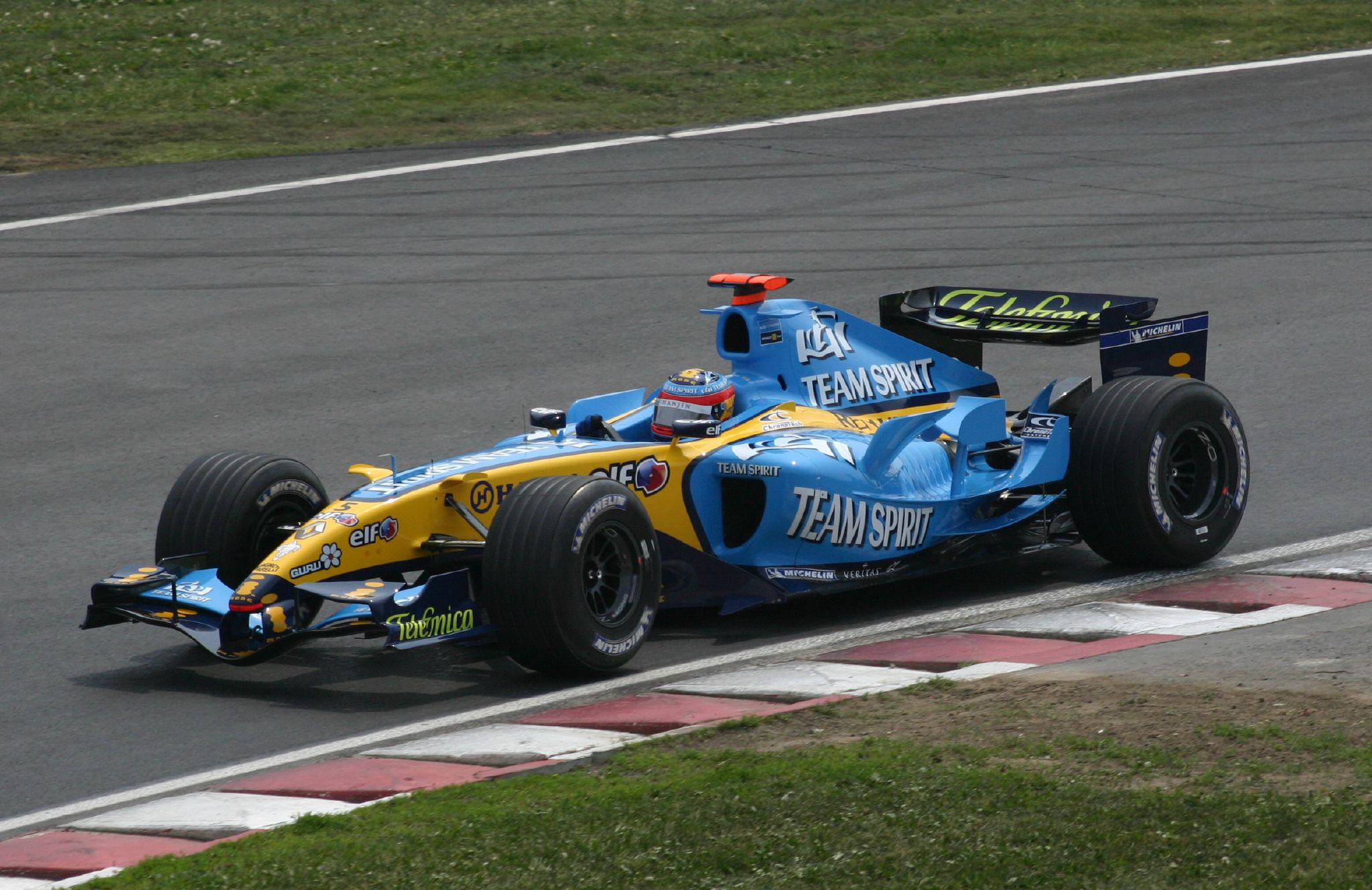
Renault finally won their first Constructors' Championship as a works team with this R25.

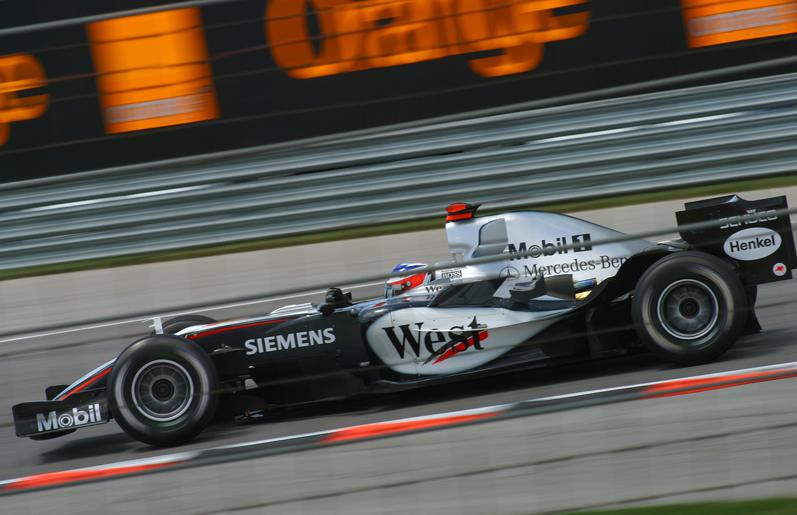
McLaren finished second in the Constructors' Championship with this MP4-20.

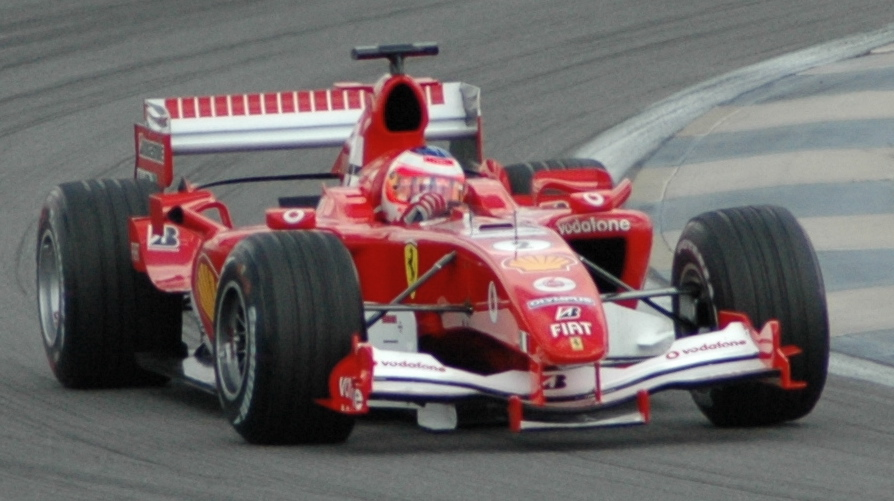
Ferrari's streak of 6 consecutive Constructors' Championships came to an end in 2005. Ferrari could only manage third place in this year's Constructors' Championship with the F2005.

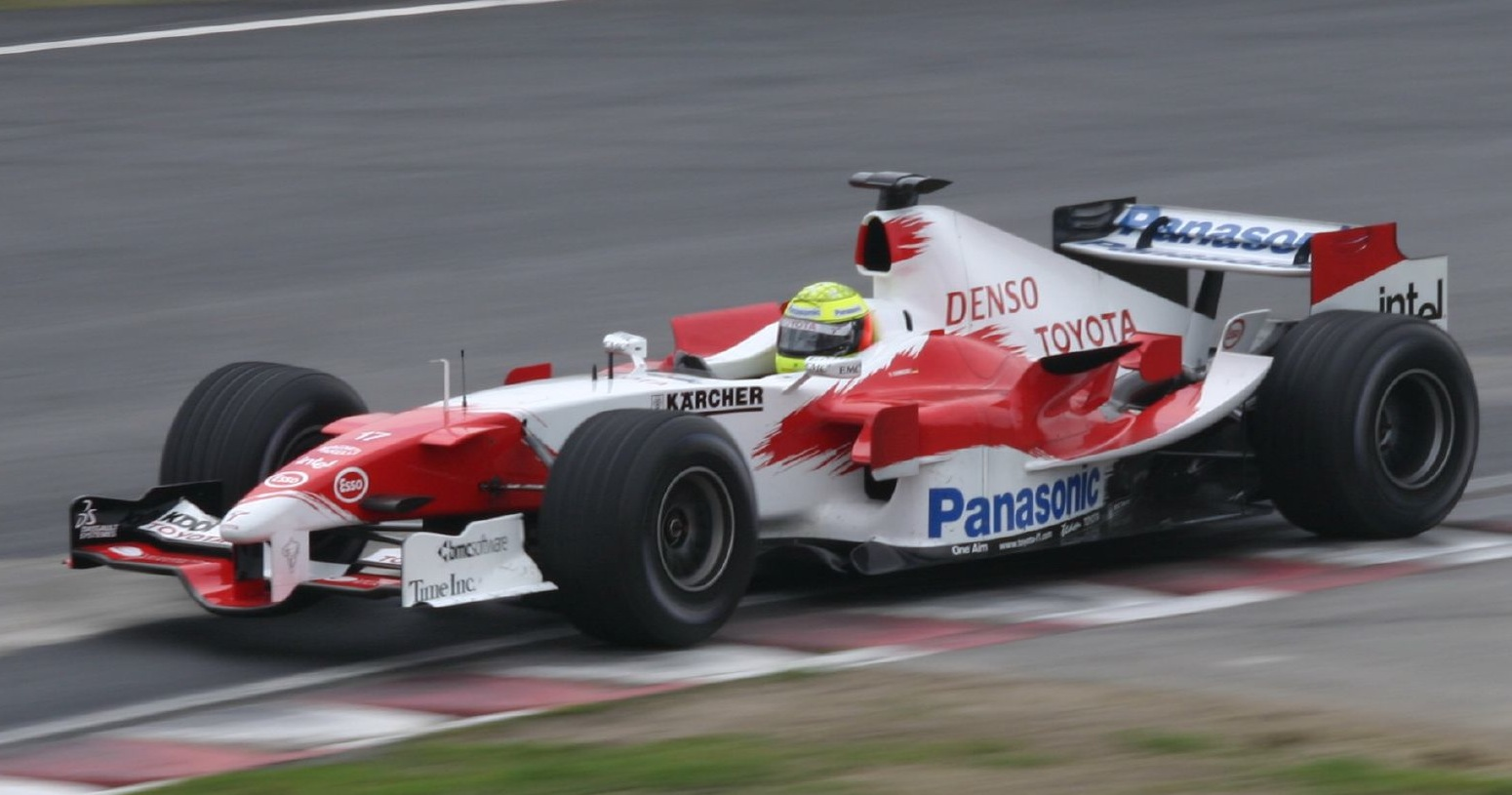
Toyota finished fourth in the Constructors' Championship with the TF105.

- Red Bull Racing, which took over the Jaguar team, ran with Cosworth engines. Red Bull's lead driver was veteran Scotsman David Coulthard who switched from McLaren, paired with Austrian Christian Klien, the 2004 Jaguar driver.
- Toyota-powered Jordan Grand Prix was purchased by Midland Group, although the team continued as Jordan until 2006.
- Sauber switched from Bridgestone to Michelin tyres over the winter, further severing their ties with the Ferrari team.
- The BAR team was banned from the Grands Prix in Spain and Monaco, after both their cars were found to be underweight at the San Marino Grand Prix.
- At the Hungarian Grand Prix, West McLaren Mercedes became Team McLaren Mercedes.
- Shortly after the United States Grand Prix, Peter Sauber announced that Credit Suisse had sold BMW their majority share in his Sauber team, which announced its intention to run as BMW's factory team in 2006.

=== Driver changes ===
- Renault partnered Fernando Alonso with the 2004 Sauber driver Giancarlo Fisichella, in a straight swap with Jacques Villeneuve (who had taken over from Jarno Trulli at Renault for the last three races of the season).
- Williams employed an all-new driver line-up in 2005, having signed Jaguar's Mark Webber and Jordan's Nick Heidfeld to replace Juan Pablo Montoya and Ralf Schumacher. Montoya moved to McLaren, in place of the Red Bull-bound David Coulthard (who took Webber's vacated seat), while Ralf Schumacher signed for Toyota. This meant that Ricardo Zonta, who had raced for Toyota in five of the final six races of 2004, returned to a third driver role in 2005. Olivier Panis, who had driven in seventeen out of eighteen races for Toyota in 2004, was retained by the team in the dual capacity of advisor and test driver. Cristiano da Matta, who had started the 2004 season with Toyota, returned to Champ Car in 2005. Jarno Trulli joined as Toyota's second driver.
- Jordan's other driver from the end of 2004, Timo Glock, also switched to Champ Car for 2005, leaving Jordan with two vacant seats. They were taken by Tiago Monteiro (a test driver for Minardi in 2004) and Narain Karthikeyan, both Formula One debutants, who had both competed in the previous year's World Series by Nissan season. Giorgio Pantano, who raced for Jordan for the majority of 2004, left Formula One altogether, joining the Super Nova Racing team for the inaugural GP2 Series season.
- Minardi also ran an all-new line-up in 2005, with their 2004 drivers—Gianmaria Bruni (who switched to GP2 in 2005) and Zsolt Baumgartner—being replaced by a pair of debutants: Patrick Friesacher and Christijan Albers, who had competed in International Formula 3000 and DTM, respectively, during the previous season.

==== Mid-season changes ====
- BAR test driver Anthony Davidson raced in Malaysia in place of an ill Takuma Sato. Sato returned to the seat for the next race.
- Following a shoulder injury to Juan Pablo Montoya, McLaren reserve driver Pedro de la Rosa raced for the team in Bahrain, with Alexander Wurz taking on third driver duties in place of de la Rosa. For the San Marino Grand Prix, de la Rosa and Wurz swapped roles. Montoya returned for the following race.
- Vitantonio Liuzzi and Christian Klien were both contracted to Red Bull Racing to participate in at least three races, and agreed to share their race seat for the season. While Klien, who had raced for the team's forerunners Jaguar in 2004, drove in the first three races, Liuzzi replaced him for the San Marino, Spanish, Monaco, and European Grands Prix. Klien returned for the Canadian Grand Prix, and completed the remainder of the season.
- Robert Doornbos was Jordan's third driver for nine of the first eleven races of the season. Franck Montagny replaced him at the European Grand Prix, while Jordan were banned from using a third car at the Canadian Grand Prix after using too many tyres at the previous race. Nicolas Kiesa replaced Doornbos for the German Grand Prix onwards, when the Dutchman replaced Patrick Friesacher at Minardi due to sponsorship issues.
- Chanoch Nissany became Minardi's third driver for the Hungarian Grand Prix. He was replaced by Enrico Toccacelo for the Turkish Grand Prix and Italian Grand Prix. Nissany was the first Israeli to participate in a Formula One weekend.
- Antônio Pizzonia replaced Nick Heidfeld at Williams for the Italian Grand Prix, when Heidfeld decided to withdraw after complaining of a severe headache. Earlier in the week, he had crashed heavily during a test session at Monza. Heidfeld had been due to return for the Brazilian Grand Prix, but after having a motorcycle accident he was forced to sit out the remainder of the season, with Pizzonia continuing to race for Williams in Heidfeld's absence.
- Ricardo Zonta filled in for Ralf Schumacher who suffered a concussion after hitting the wall in practice at the 2005 United States Grand Prix. Zonta drove Schumacher's car in qualifying; however, due to concerns over the Michelin tyres, Zonta along with the other 13 Michelin-shod cars withdrew from the race.

== Calendar ==
The 2005 Formula One calendar featured one new event, the Turkish Grand Prix.

Round	Grand Prix	Circuit	Date
1	Australian Grand Prix	(Australia) Albert Park Circuit, Melbourne	6 March
2	Malaysian Grand Prix	(Malaysia) Sepang International Circuit, Kuala Lumpur	20 March
3	Bahrain Grand Prix	Bahrain International Circuit, Sakhir	3 April
4	San Marino Grand Prix	(Italy) Autodromo Enzo e Dino Ferrari, Imola	24 April
5	Spanish Grand Prix	(Spain) Circuit de Catalunya, Montmeló	8 May
6	Monaco Grand Prix	Circuit de Monaco, Monte-Carlo	22 May
7	European Grand Prix	(Germany) Nürburgring, Nürburg	29 May
8	Canadian Grand Prix	(Canada) Circuit Gilles Villeneuve, Montreal	12 June
9	United States Grand Prix	(United States) Indianapolis Motor Speedway, Speedway	19 June
10	French Grand Prix	(France) Circuit de Nevers Magny-Cours, Magny-Cours	3 July
11	British Grand Prix	(United Kingdom) Silverstone Circuit, Silverstone	10 July
12	German Grand Prix	(Germany) Hockenheimring, Hockenheim	24 July
13	Hungarian Grand Prix	(Hungary) Hungaroring, Mogyoród	31 July
14	Turkish Grand Prix	(Turkey) Istanbul Park, Istanbul	21 August
15	Italian Grand Prix	(Italy) Autodromo Nazionale di Monza, Monza	4 September
16	Belgian Grand Prix	(Belgium) Circuit de Spa-Francorchamps, Stavelot	11 September
17	Brazilian Grand Prix	(Brazil) Autódromo José Carlos Pace, São Paulo	25 September
18	Japanese Grand Prix	(Japan) Suzuka Circuit, Suzuka	9 October
19	Chinese Grand Prix	(China) Shanghai International Circuit, Shanghai	16 October

=== Calendar changes ===
- With the Brazilian Grand Prix being run in late September, the Chinese Grand Prix became the final race of the season.
- The Turkish Grand Prix was added to the calendar after the Hungarian Grand Prix on 21 August.

== Regulation changes ==
For a time there existed a distinct possibility that some teams would be running three race cars per Grand Prix: fewer than 10 teams, or 20 cars, starting on the grid would have resulted in some teams running three cars, under a term in the Concorde Agreement. By the first round of the season, there were ten teams, as Red Bull completed their takeover of Jaguar and were ready to race in Australia. Minardi, which initially received an injunction allowing them to compete despite their cars' non-conformity to new 2005 technical regulations, later modified their cars to adhere to 2005 regulations.

=== Technical regulations ===
- A major change in 2005 was the outlawing of tyre changes during pit stops. Now a driver had to use one set of tyres during qualifying and the race itself. The reason for this rule change was to motivate the teams to select harder tyre compounds with less grip, reducing cornering speeds, which was intended to improve safety. Tyre changes were allowed for punctures and for wet weather, under the direction of the FIA. The FIA had to post a "change in climatic conditions" notice in order for tyre changes to occur normally as a force majeure. After Kimi Räikkönen's disastrous accident at the Nurburgring when his suspension collapsed after a flat-spotted tyre ripped the carbon fibre suspension apart, team principals and the FIA agreed that a single tyre change per car could be made without penalty, provided it was to change a tyre that had become dangerously worn like Räikkönen's had. Preserving a single set of tyres for the entire race became a new challenge for drivers; the challenge for tyre manufactures was to produce more durable, long-lasting compounds. Michelin-shod runners had a distinct advantage over their Bridgestone counterparts.
- Formula One engines had to last two race weekends, double that demanded by 2004 regulations. A driver who needed to change an engine was subject to a 10-place grid penalty for the race. Designed to limit revs and power outputs demanded by greater reliability, this regulation was also a cost-cutting measure for engine manufacturers. After the initial race of the season, the FIA acted to close a loophole in this new regulation exposed by BAR, who deliberately pitted their cars rather than finish the race.
- The technical aerodynamics regulations were modified to improve competition, especially for cars travelling in another car's air flow wake in order to overtake. By changing the size and placement of both front and rear wings, as well as requiring higher noses, the new rules attempted to reduce downforce by roughly one-quarter, but teams developed other chassis innovations to reclaim much of that "lost" downforce, which made following another car even harder than the previous season. Front wings have been lifted by 5 cm (50 mm), to reduce downforce, while the rear wings have been brought forward 15 cm (150 mm) relative to the centre line between the rear wheels.
- This was the final season in which the 3.0-litre V10 engine configuration was used by all teams. New changes in the technical regulations saw a 2.4-litre V8 engine configuration being introduced by the FIA for the 2006 Formula One season; however, the FIA granted an exemption for teams who were unable to re-engineer or could not afford a V8 engine in time for 2006. Budget or resource-limited teams were allowed to run a rev-limited 3.0-litre V10. Ten of the eleven teams ran with a conventional 2.4L V8 for 2006, with the exception of Scuderia Toro Rosso, who continued and were permitted by the FIA to use a rev-limited Cosworth TJ2006 3.0L V10 powerplant.

=== Sporting regulations ===
- The first six races of the 2005 season used a new qualifying format, marking the third year in five with sharply revised qualifying rules. Grid position was determined by aggregate times from two single-lap flying runs, one Saturday afternoon and one Sunday morning. Refueling was allowed after the first qualifying run Saturday; however, the car must have been fuelled for the race for Sunday's qualifying. (Although some rules changes are brought about to even the playing field or to reduce costs, this rule change was prompted by the typhoon which rescheduled qualifying for the 2004 Japanese Grand Prix). Adverse weather conditions affecting either qualifying session impacted the final, aggregate time. On 24 May, the ten team bosses met with Max Mosley and recommended a return to a single, one-lap qualifying run on Saturday on race fuel and race tyres, which, having been approved by the FIA World Motor Sport Council, took effect at the European Grand Prix on 29 May.
- If a driver stalled his car while entering the final grid, the other cars were sent instantly to a new warm-up lap, instead of all drivers stopping their cars and waiting a couple of minutes for a new start. The stalled car is pushed to the pit lane and the grid is clear when the drivers return.
- When the race was red-flagged, the timekeeping system would not stop. The drivers would stop on the start/finish straight, and the restart would take place behind the safety car instead of a standing start which was used earlier. Although this rule came in effect in 2005, it was first used at the 2007 European Grand Prix.
- Also in safety car situations, the rules were changed to allow the safety car to use the pit lane if necessary. This rule change was made following Ralf Schumacher's accident in 2004 United States Grand Prix.

== Season report ==
The most-noted aspect of the season was Ferrari's lack of pace caused mainly by a new rule prohibiting tyre changes during the course of a race. The Bridgestone tyres used by Ferrari could not find the right balance between performance and reliability, leaving the Michelin runners to battle for race victories. Further rule changes emphasised the new focus on reliability, with engines required to last two Grands Prix without being changed. This change caused BAR to slip out of the top five.

Renault appeared the fastest team in pre-season testing and it was no surprise they dominated the early fly-away rounds. Giancarlo Fisichella won the season opener in Australia before teammate Alonso demonstrated his title credentials with a series of victories in Malaysia, Bahrain and San Marino. As the season progressed the McLarens of Kimi Räikkönen and Juan Pablo Montoya became increasingly competitive and by the latter stages of the season the McLaren was generally considered the faster package. However, constant technical failures meant neither the team nor Räikkönen were able to translate their speed into championship success.

Alonso secured his Drivers' Championship with a third-place finish in the Brazilian Grand Prix. Despite both him and Räikkönen having six victories to their name at this point in the season, Alonso's greater consistency meant he was able to claim the championship with two rounds to spare. The Constructors' Championship was secured by Renault at the final race, with Alonso's seventh victory of the year. This gave Renault their first championship as a constructor (after only previously triumphing as an engine supplier) despite winning two fewer races than McLaren.

Ferrari finished third in the Constructors' Championship with only one win, at the United States Grand Prix, a race that was only contested by the six Bridgestone cars after Michelin declared their tyres unsafe to run in the Indianapolis Motor Speedway's unique banked corner.

After a high-flying 2004 season the most conspicuous drop in performance after Ferrari was BAR-Honda, who were banned from two races after scrutineers in San Marino discovered a hidden fuel compartment that allowed their cars to run underweight. They were beaten in the championship by Williams, whose engine partner BMW had announced they were leaving to join Sauber in June, and Toyota, who achieved 5 podium finishes and were only beaten to third in the championship because of Ferrari's 1–2 in Indianapolis.

All the teams scored world championship points over the course of the season, Minardi scoring rare points in their final season courtesy of being able to run in the US race. The 2005 season also saw nine different drivers score a pole position - setting a new record for the number of different polesitters in a season eclipsing the previous record of eight different polesitters set in the 1968 season. This tally of different polesitters remains a record as of the end of the 2024 championship.

== Results and standings ==
The 2005 Formula One calendar featured a new event in Turkey, just miles from the Europe–Asia dividing line. The newly built circuit in Istanbul joined the 2004 newcomers Bahrain and China. The 2005 season witnessed two of the hottest Grands Prix ever: the track temperature at the beginning of the Malaysian event was 51 °C (124 °F), while in Bahrain the mercury soared past 56 °C (133 °F).

=== Grands Prix ===
Round	Grand Prix	Pole position	Fastest lap	Winning driver	Winning constructor	Report
1	(Australia) Australian Grand Prix	(Italy) Giancarlo Fisichella	(Spain) Fernando Alonso	(Italy) Giancarlo Fisichella	(France) Renault	Report
2	(Malaysia) Malaysian Grand Prix	(Spain) Fernando Alonso	(Finland) Kimi Räikkönen	(Spain) Fernando Alonso	(France) Renault	Report
3	Bahrain Grand Prix	(Spain) Fernando Alonso	(Spain) Pedro de la Rosa	(Spain) Fernando Alonso	(France) Renault	Report
4	(Italy) San Marino Grand Prix	(Finland) Kimi Räikkönen	(Germany) Michael Schumacher	(Spain) Fernando Alonso	(France) Renault	Report
5	(Spain) Spanish Grand Prix	(Finland) Kimi Räikkönen	(Italy) Giancarlo Fisichella	(Finland) Kimi Räikkönen	(United Kingdom) McLaren-Mercedes	Report
6	Monaco Grand Prix	(Finland) Kimi Räikkönen	(Germany) Michael Schumacher	(Finland) Kimi Räikkönen	(United Kingdom) McLaren-Mercedes	Report
7	(Germany) European Grand Prix	(Germany) Nick Heidfeld	(Spain) Fernando Alonso	(Spain) Fernando Alonso	(France) Renault	Report
8	(Canada) Canadian Grand Prix	(United Kingdom) Jenson Button	(Finland) Kimi Räikkönen	(Finland) Kimi Räikkönen	(United Kingdom) McLaren-Mercedes	Report
9	United States Grand Prix	(Italy) Jarno Trulli (Note: Jarno Trulli set the fastest time in qualifying, but did not start the race along with the other cars running Michelin tyres. Pole position was left vacant on the grid. Michael Schumacher, in the fifth slot, was the first driver on the grid. Trulli is still considered to have held pole position.)	(Germany) Michael Schumacher	(Germany) Michael Schumacher	(Italy) Ferrari	Report
10	(France) French Grand Prix	(Spain) Fernando Alonso	(Finland) Kimi Räikkönen	(Spain) Fernando Alonso	(France) Renault	Report
11	(United Kingdom) British Grand Prix	(Spain) Fernando Alonso	(Finland) Kimi Räikkönen	(Colombia) Juan Pablo Montoya	(United Kingdom) McLaren-Mercedes	Report
12	(Germany) German Grand Prix	(Finland) Kimi Räikkönen	(Finland) Kimi Räikkönen	(Spain) Fernando Alonso	(France) Renault	Report
13	(Hungary) Hungarian Grand Prix	(Germany) Michael Schumacher	(Finland) Kimi Räikkönen	(Finland) Kimi Räikkönen	(United Kingdom) McLaren-Mercedes	Report
14	(Turkey) Turkish Grand Prix	(Finland) Kimi Räikkönen	(Colombia) Juan Pablo Montoya	(Finland) Kimi Räikkönen	(United Kingdom) McLaren-Mercedes	Report
15	(Italy) Italian Grand Prix	(Colombia) Juan Pablo Montoya	(Finland) Kimi Räikkönen	(Colombia) Juan Pablo Montoya	(United Kingdom) McLaren-Mercedes	Report
16	(Belgium) Belgian Grand Prix	(Colombia) Juan Pablo Montoya	(Germany) Ralf Schumacher	(Finland) Kimi Räikkönen	(United Kingdom) McLaren-Mercedes	Report
17	(Brazil) Brazilian Grand Prix	(Spain) Fernando Alonso	(Finland) Kimi Räikkönen	(Colombia) Juan Pablo Montoya	(United Kingdom) McLaren-Mercedes	Report
18	(Japan) Japanese Grand Prix	(Germany) Ralf Schumacher	(Finland) Kimi Räikkönen	(Finland) Kimi Räikkönen	(United Kingdom) McLaren-Mercedes	Report
19	(China) Chinese Grand Prix	(Spain) Fernando Alonso	(Finland) Kimi Räikkönen	(Spain) Fernando Alonso	(France) Renault	Report

=== Scoring system ===
Points were awarded to the top eight classified finishers.

Position	1st	2nd	3rd	4th	5th	6th	7th	8th
Points	10	8	6	5	4	3	2	1

=== World Drivers' Championship standings ===
Pos.	Driver	AUS (Australia)	MAL (Malaysia)	BHR (Bahrain)	SMR (Italy)	ESP (Spain)	MON (Monaco)	EUR (Germany)	CAN (Canada)	USA^{‡} (United States)	FRA (France)	GBR (United Kingdom)	GER (Germany)	HUN (Hungary)	TUR (Turkey)	ITA (Italy)	BEL (Belgium)	BRA (Brazil)	JPN (Japan)	CHN (China)	Points
1	(Spain) Fernando Alonso	3^{F}	1^{P}	1^{P}	1	2	4	1^{F}	Ret	DNS	1^{P}	2^{P}	1	11	2	2	2	3^{P}	3	1^{P}	133
2	(Finland) Kimi Räikkönen	8	9^{F}	3	Ret^{P}	1^{P}	1^{P}	11^{†}	1^{F}	DNS	2^{F}	3^{F}	Ret^{P}^{F}	1^{F}	1^{P}	4^{F}	1	2^{F}	1^{F}	2^{F}	112
3	(Germany) Michael Schumacher	Ret	7	Ret	2^{F}	Ret	7^{F}	5	2	1^{F}	3	6	5	2^{P}	Ret	10	Ret	4	7	Ret	62
4	(Colombia) Juan Pablo Montoya	6	4			7	5	7	DSQ	DNS	Ret	1	2	Ret	3^{F}	1^{P}	14^{P}^{†}	1	Ret	Ret	60
5	(Italy) Giancarlo Fisichella	1^{P}	Ret	Ret	Ret	5^{F}	12	6	Ret	DNS	6	4	4	9	4	3	Ret	5	2	4	58
6	(Germany) Ralf Schumacher	12	5	4	9	4	6	Ret	6	WD	7	8	6	3	12	6	7^{F}	8	8^{P}	3	45
7	(Italy) Jarno Trulli	9	2	2	5	3	10	8	Ret	DNS^{P}	5	9	14^{†}	4	6	5	Ret	13^{†}	Ret	15	43
8	(Brazil) Rubens Barrichello	2	Ret	9	Ret	9	8	3	3	2	9	7	10	10	10	12	5	6	11	12	38
9	(United Kingdom) Jenson Button	11^{†}	Ret	Ret	DSQ	EX	EX	10	Ret^{P}	DNS	4	5	3	5	5	8	3	7	5	8	37
10	(Australia) Mark Webber	5	Ret	6	7	6	3	Ret	5	DNS	12	11	NC	7	Ret	14	4	NC	4	7	36
11	(Germany) Nick Heidfeld	Ret	3	Ret	6	10	2	2^{P}	Ret	DNS	14	12	11	6	Ret	WD					28
12	(United Kingdom) David Coulthard	4	6	8	11	8	Ret	4	7	DNS	10	13	7	Ret	7	15	Ret	Ret	6	9	24
13	(Brazil) Felipe Massa	10	10	7	10	11^{†}	9	14	4	DNS	Ret	10	8	14	Ret	9	10	11	10	6	11
14	(Canada) Jacques Villeneuve	13	Ret	11^{†}	4	Ret	11	13	9	DNS	8	14	15	Ret	11	11	6	12	12	10	9
15	(Austria) Christian Klien	7	8	DNS					8	DNS	Ret	15	9	Ret	8	13	9	9	9	5	9
16	(Portugal) Tiago Monteiro	16	12	10	13	12	13	15	10	3	13	17	17	13	15	17	8	Ret	13	11	7
17	(Austria) Alexander Wurz				3																6
18	(India) Narain Karthikeyan	15	11	Ret	12	13	Ret	16	Ret	4	15	Ret	16	12	14	20	11	15	15	Ret	5
19	(Netherlands) Christijan Albers	Ret	13	13	Ret	Ret	14	17	11	5	Ret	18	13	NC	Ret	19	12	14	16	16^{†}	4
20	(Spain) Pedro de la Rosa			5^{F}																	4
21	(Austria) Patrick Friesacher	17	Ret	12	Ret	Ret	Ret	18	Ret	6	Ret	19									3
22	(Brazil) Antônio Pizzonia															7	15^{†}	Ret	Ret	13^{†}	2
23	(Japan) Takuma Sato	14^{†}	WD	Ret	DSQ	EX	EX	12	Ret	DNS	11	16	12	8	9	16	Ret	10	DSQ	Ret	1
24	(Italy) Vitantonio Liuzzi				8	Ret	Ret	9													1
25	(Monaco) Robert Doornbos												18	Ret	13	18	13	Ret	14	14^{†}	0
—	(United Kingdom) Anthony Davidson		Ret																		0
—	(Brazil) Ricardo Zonta									DNS											0
Pos.	Driver	AUS (Australia)	MAL (Malaysia)	BHR (Bahrain)	SMR (Italy)	ESP (Spain)	MON (Monaco)	EUR (Germany)	CAN (Canada)	USA^{‡} (United States)	FRA (France)	GBR (United Kingdom)	GER (Germany)	HUN (Hungary)	TUR (Turkey)	ITA (Italy)	BEL (Belgium)	BRA (Brazil)	JPN (Japan)	CHN (China)	Points

Key
Colour	Result
Gold	Winner
Silver	Second place
Bronze	Third place
Green	Other points position
Blue	Other classified position
Blue	Not classified, finished (NC)
Purple	Not classified, retired (Ret)
Red	Did not qualify (DNQ)
Black	Disqualified (DSQ)
White	Did not start (DNS)
White	Race cancelled (C)
Blank	Did not practice (DNP)
Blank	Excluded (EX)
Blank	Did not arrive (DNA)
Blank	Withdrawn (WD)
Blank	Did not enter (empty cell)
Annotation	Meaning
P	Pole position
F	Fastest lap

Notes:

- † – Drivers did not finish the Grand Prix, but were classified as they completed more than 90% of the race distance.
- ‡ – Teams supplied with Michelin tyres elected to withdraw from the United States Grand Prix before the race started due to safety concerns.

=== World Constructors' Championship standings ===
Pos.	Constructor	No.	AUS (Australia)	MAL (Malaysia)	BHR (Bahrain)	SMR (Italy)	ESP (Spain)	MON (Monaco)	EUR (Germany)	CAN (Canada)	USA^{‡} (United States)	FRA (France)	GBR (United Kingdom)	GER (Germany)	HUN (Hungary)	TUR (Turkey)	ITA (Italy)	BEL (Belgium)	BRA (Brazil)	JPN (Japan)	CHN (China)	Points
1	(France) Renault	5	3^{F}	1^{P}	1^{P}	1	2	4	1^{F}	Ret	DNS	1^{P}	2^{P}	1	11	2	2	2	3^{P}	3	1^{P}	191
1	(France) Renault	6	1^{P}	Ret	Ret	Ret	5^{F}	12	6	Ret	DNS	6	4	4	9	4	3	Ret	5	2	4	191
2	(United Kingdom) McLaren-Mercedes	9	8	9^{F}	3	Ret^{P}	1^{P}	1^{P}	11^{†}	1^{F}	DNS	2^{F}	3^{F}	Ret^{P}^{F}	1^{F}	1^{P}	4^{F}	1	2^{F}	1^{F}	2^{F}	182
2	(United Kingdom) McLaren-Mercedes	10	6	4	5^{F}	3	7	5	7	DSQ	DNS	Ret	1	2	Ret	3^{F}	1^{P}	14^{P}^{†}	1	Ret	Ret	182
3	(Italy) Ferrari	1	Ret	7	Ret	2^{F}	Ret	7^{F}	5	2	1^{F}	3	6	5	2^{P}	Ret	10	Ret	4	7	Ret	100
3	(Italy) Ferrari	2	2	Ret	9	Ret	9	8	3	3	2	9	7	10	10	10	12	5	6	11	12	100
4	(Japan) Toyota	16	9	2	2	5	3	10	8	Ret	DNS^{P}	5	9	14^{†}	4	6	5	Ret	13^{†}	Ret	15	88
4	(Japan) Toyota	17	12	5	4	9	4	6	Ret	6	DNS	7	8	6	3	12	6	7^{F}	8	8^{P}	3	88
5	(United Kingdom) Williams-BMW	7	5	Ret	6	7	6	3	Ret	5	DNS	12	11	NC	7	Ret	14	4	NC	4	7	66
5	(United Kingdom) Williams-BMW	8	Ret	3	Ret	6	10	2	2^{P}	Ret	DNS	14	12	11	6	Ret	7	15^{†}	Ret	Ret	13^{†}	66
6	(United Kingdom) BAR-Honda	3	11^{†}	Ret	Ret	DSQ	EX	EX	10	Ret^{P}	DNS	4	5	3	5	5	8	3	7	5	8	38
6	(United Kingdom) BAR-Honda	4	14^{†}	Ret	Ret	DSQ	EX	EX	12	Ret	DNS	11	16	12	8	9	16	Ret	10	DSQ	Ret	38
7	(United Kingdom) Red Bull-Cosworth	14	4	6	8	11	8	Ret	4	7	DNS	10	13	7	Ret	7	15	Ret	Ret	6	9	34
7	(United Kingdom) Red Bull-Cosworth	15	7	8	DNS	8	Ret	Ret	9	8	DNS	Ret	15	9	Ret	8	13	9	9	9	5	34
8	(Switzerland) Sauber-Petronas	11	13	Ret	11^{†}	4	Ret	11	13	9	DNS	8	14	15	Ret	11	11	6	12	12	10	20
8	(Switzerland) Sauber-Petronas	12	10	10	7	10	11^{†}	9	14	4	DNS	Ret	10	8	14	Ret	9	10	11	10	6	20
9	(Republic of Ireland) Jordan-Toyota	18	16	12	10	13	12	13	15	10	3	13	17	17	13	15	17	8	Ret	13	11	12
9	(Republic of Ireland) Jordan-Toyota	19	15	11	Ret	12	13	Ret	16	Ret	4	15	Ret	16	12	14	20	11	15	15	Ret	12
10	(Italy) Minardi-Cosworth	20	17	Ret	12	Ret	Ret	Ret	18	Ret	6	Ret	19	18	Ret	13	18	13	Ret	14	14^{†}	7
10	(Italy) Minardi-Cosworth	21	Ret	13	13	Ret	Ret	14	17	11	5	Ret	18	13	NC	Ret	19	12	14	16	16^{†}	7
Pos.	Constructor	No.	AUS (Australia)	MAL (Malaysia)	BHR (Bahrain)	SMR (Italy)	ESP (Spain)	MON (Monaco)	EUR (Germany)	CAN (Canada)	USA^{‡} (United States)	FRA (France)	GBR (United Kingdom)	GER (Germany)	HUN (Hungary)	TUR (Turkey)	ITA (Italy)	BEL (Belgium)	BRA (Brazil)	JPN (Japan)	CHN (China)	Points

Key
Colour	Result
Gold	Winner
Silver	Second place
Bronze	Third place
Green	Other points position
Blue	Other classified position
Blue	Not classified, finished (NC)
Purple	Not classified, retired (Ret)
Red	Did not qualify (DNQ)
Black	Disqualified (DSQ)
White	Did not start (DNS)
White	Race cancelled (C)
Blank	Did not practice (DNP)
Blank	Excluded (EX)
Blank	Did not arrive (DNA)
Blank	Withdrawn (WD)
Blank	Did not enter (empty cell)
Annotation	Meaning
P	Pole position
F	Fastest lap

Notes:

- † – Drivers did not finish the Grand Prix, but were classified as they completed more than 90% of the race distance.
- ‡ – Teams supplied with Michelin tyres elected to withdraw from the United States Grand Prix before the race started due to safety concerns.
