= 2005 Hungarian Grand Prix =

Coordinates: 47°34′44″N 19°14′55″E

Race 13 of 19 in the 2005 Formula One World Championship
← Previous race	Next race →

Race details
- Date: 31 July 2005
- Official name: Formula 1 Marlboro Magyar Nagydíj 2005
- Location: Hungaroring, Mogyoród, Pest, Hungary
- Course: Permanent racing facility
- Course length: 4.381 km (2.722 miles)
- Distance: 70 laps, 306.663 km (190.552 miles)
- Weather: Sunny, Air: 34 °C (93 °F), Track 45 °C (113 °F)

Pole position
Driver	(Germany) Michael Schumacher	Ferrari
- Time: 1:19.882

Fastest lap
Driver	(Finland) Kimi Räikkönen	McLaren-Mercedes
- Time: 1:21.219 on lap 40

Podium
First	(Finland) Kimi Räikkönen	McLaren-Mercedes
Second	(Germany) Michael Schumacher	Ferrari
Third	(Germany) Ralf Schumacher	Toyota

The 2005 Hungarian Grand Prix (officially the Formula 1 Marlboro Magyar Nagydíj 2005) was a Formula One race, held on 31 July 2005 in the Hungaroring, Mogyoród, Pest, Hungary at 14:00 CEST (UTC+2). It was the 13th race of the 2005 Formula One World Championship.

== Friday drivers ==
The bottom 6 teams in the 2004 Constructors' Championship were entitled to run a third car in free practice on Friday. These drivers drove on Friday but did not compete in qualifying or the race.

Constructor	Nat	Driver
McLaren-Mercedes	(Austria)	Alexander Wurz
Sauber-Petronas		-
Red Bull-Cosworth	(Italy)	Vitantonio Liuzzi
Toyota	(Brazil)	Ricardo Zonta
Jordan-Toyota	(Denmark)	Nicolas Kiesa
Minardi-Cosworth	(Israel)	Chanoch Nissany

== Report ==
=== Background ===
After the German Grand Prix, Fernando Alonso led the drivers' championship with 36 points ahead of Kimi Räikkönen and 40 points ahead of Michael Schumacher. In the constructors' championship, Renault led McLaren-Mercedes by 22 points and Ferrari by 39 points.

The race saw the beginning of the end of tobacco advertising in F1 due to the Europe-wide ban. McLaren (West) ran with tobacco livery just on Friday and BAR (Lucky Strike) ran with tobacco livery on Friday and Saturday before withdrawing it for the race, while Ferrari (Marlboro), Renault (Mild Seven), and Jordan (Benson & Hedges) ran full tobacco livery for the entire weekend. It was the last Formula One race to be sponsored by a tobacco company.

This is also the only official Formula One race weekend for Chanoch Nissany, who drove for Minardi in Free Practice 1 and was just over six seconds behind the next slowest driver.

=== Qualifying ===
Seven time World Champion Michael Schumacher surprised the paddock by taking his first pole position of the season, causing speculation that he was running a light first fuel load in order to build a gap on a circuit on which overtaking is notoriously difficult. Beside him on the front row was Juan Pablo Montoya, nearly 9 tenths behind. Jarno Trulli continued his impressive qualifying form by taking 3rd place, while Kimi Räikkönen took fourth spot despite being the first runner out on the dirty circuit. Championship leader Fernando Alonso started in sixth position.

=== Race ===
Race day was hot, with the air temperature at 34 °C, and track temperature 47 °C at the start of the race. Both Michael Schumacher and Montoya got fast starts, while Räikkönen took Trulli off the line, and ended the lap in second place, having passed his teammate as well. Further back, Alonso was squeezed into turn one by Ralf Schumacher, the German's right-rear wheel making contact with Alonso's front wing and causing it to hang unevenly. Rubens Barrichello braked too late into the first turn, breaking his front wing on Trulli's diffuser. Further back, Christian Klien made contact with Jacques Villeneuve, with their wheels touching as they fought for position in the first turn. This sent Klien into a spectacular barrel-roll, before finishing the right way up, and unharmed. Red Bull Racing's race then went from bad to worse, with Alonso's front wing dislodging itself between turns 10 and 11, into the path of several drivers. Most managed to avoid it, but David Coulthard, apparently unsighted by Mark Webber's Williams, hit the debris, causing the Scot's right-front suspension to break and force him into retirement. At the end of lap 1, Schumacher led by 1.9 seconds over Räikkönen, who was a further 2.4 seconds ahead of Montoya. Alonso, Barrichello and Jordan's Tiago Monteiro were all forced to pit at the end of the lap for repairs.

Immediately, Räikkönen began pressuring Schumacher, the pair lapping Monteiro after just 4 laps. Räikkönen and Schumacher then began trading fastest laps, and the gap was cut down to just 0.792 seconds after 9 laps. Meanwhile, Barrichello, forced back due to his early damage, got past Minardi's Robert Doornbos, clear superior car speed meaning the Dutch driver could offer no resistance. Räikkönen entered the pits first, on lap 11, showing that his qualifying effort was significantly helped by the light fuel load, and leaving Schumacher to attempt to open a gap before his own stop. Barrichello also made his move on Christijan Albers, moving up to 14th, while Alonso finally dispatched Doornbos to move up to 16th place. Trulli became the second driver to take his scheduled fuel stop on lap 13, while Alonso made short work of Albers to move into 15th. Barrichello continued his charge, taking Narain Karthikeyan for 13th place on lap 14. The question of how much fuel was in Schumacher's car was answered on lap 15, with the German refuelling to leave Montoya in the lead. Schumacher rejoined reasonably comfortably ahead of Räikkönen, while his brother Ralf Schumacher managed to leapfrog teammate Trulli, who was still suffering with a damaged diffuser.

Montoya stretched his lead to over 16 seconds by lap 17, while Doornbos, Karthikeyan and Monteiro all made their stops from the back of the field. Montoya took his first stop on lap 22, but his lead was not large enough to allow him to stay in the lead, rejoining in 3rd place, behind Michael Schumacher and Räikkönen, and ahead of Jenson Button, who had yet to stop. Button took his pitstop alongside Giancarlo Fisichella on the following lap, while Räikkönen again closed in on Michael Schumacher, reducing the gap to just 0.6 seconds by lap 24. Alonso took his first scheduled stop on lap 26, rejoining the race in 14th, and still well out of the pointscoring positions. Lap 27 saw Nick Heidfeld and Jacques Villeneuve pit, the pair apparently on two-stop strategies, while Mark Webber showed that he was fuelled heavily during qualifying, becoming the last driver to take their first stop, on lap 29, from 7th position. Meanwhile, Robert Doornbos pulled off to retire, the team citing hydraulic failure for his early demise.

On lap 30, Michael Schumacher led by just 0.6 seconds over Räikkönen, the Finn apparently content to stay behind the German until their next stops. Montoya was in third position, ahead of Ralf Schumacher, Trulli, Button, Heidfeld, Takuma Sato, Fisichella, Barrichello and Webber. The Saubers of Villeneuve and Felipe Massa sat in 12th and 13th, both of their Petronas engines sounding rough. Trulli and Barrichello pitted on lap 33, followed by Michael Schumacher on lap 35. The German held just a 0.5 second lead over Räikkönen, who pitted on the following lap. The gap was enough for Räikkönen to take the position from Schumacher. Montoya then slowed considerably, and pitted at the end of lap 41 to retire from the race. This handed Räikkönen a comfortable lead over Schumacher, and pushed Ralf Schumacher into a potential podium position. Massa entered the pits on lap 42, spending several laps as the team attempted to fix the damage caused by a small fire due to a fuel spill. On lap 43, Fisichella ran wide at turn 4, losing 8th position to Webber.

Now released from behind Schumacher, Räikkönen was able to show the full speed of his McLaren. He increased the gap to over 20 seconds by lap 44. Button made his second and final pitstop on lap 47 from 5th place, rejoining the race in 6th. Räikkönen took his final stop on the following lap, with his lead large enough to allow him to comfortably rejoin still ahead of Schumacher. Most of the field took their final stops between laps 50 and 55, with little change in the front of the field, although Webber was able to leapfrog Sato to take 7th place. Michael Schumacher made his final stop on lap 57 from a distant second place, rejoining just 4.4 seconds ahead of his brother, who was showing impressive speed in the Toyota. By lap 62, Räikkönen had increased his lead to over half a minute, while Ralf Schumacher closed the gap to just 2.9 seconds behind Michael. Three laps later, the gap was reduced to 1.2 seconds, with all cars except the top 6 at least one lap behind the leader Räikkönen. Albers took a lengthy stop on lap 51, but rejoined the race a few laps later, while Villeneuve retired from the race on lap 57 due to yet another small engine fire on a Sauber. Fisichella took a quick "splash-and-dash" to the finish on lap 68, but was able to hold his 9th position ahead of 10th-placed Barrichello. Räikkönen took a very important comfortable victory ahead of Michael Schumacher who was able to withstand the late charge from Ralf Schumacher, who scored his first podium finish of the year, and his first for Toyota. Fourth place went to Trulli, ahead of Jenson Button, followed by the Williams' of Heidfeld and Webber, with Sato scoring his first point of the year in 8th. Alonso finished in a disappointing 11th position.

Winner Kimi Räikkönen declined the traditional champagne spraying as a mark tribute to 29-year-old McLaren chef Darren Hawker, who died on 27 July. Hawker fell from the eighth floor of the Marriott Hotel in Budapest. It was not the first time that such an event befell F1, as in 1991 a Lotus mechanic died in similar circumstances at the San Marino Grand Prix.

The result meant that Räikkönen moved to within 26 points of Alonso with 6 races remaining, and a good result next race should give him a chance at the championship, given McLaren's apparent superior speed. Michael Schumacher sits in 3rd place on 55 points, while the following six drivers will all be out of the championship race if they fail to score in the Turkish Grand Prix. McLaren reduced the gap to Renault to just 12 points in the constructor's championship, followed by Ferrari, another 19 points in arrears. BAR took their fourth consecutive points haul of the year, but still lie a disappointing (by 2004's standards) 7th place.

== Classification ==
=== Qualifying ===
Pos	No	Driver	Constructor	Lap	Gap	Grid
1	1	(Germany) Michael Schumacher	Ferrari	1:19.882	—	1
2	10	(Colombia) Juan Pablo Montoya	McLaren-Mercedes	1:20.779	+0.897	2
3	16	(Italy) Jarno Trulli	Toyota	1:20.839	+0.957	3
4	9	(Finland) Kimi Räikkönen	McLaren-Mercedes	1:20.891	+1.009	4
5	17	(Germany) Ralf Schumacher	Toyota	1:20.964	+1.082	5
6	5	(Spain) Fernando Alonso	Renault	1:21.141	+1.259	6
7	2	(Brazil) Rubens Barrichello	Ferrari	1:21.158	+1.276	7
8	3	(United Kingdom) Jenson Button	BAR-Honda	1:21.302	+1.420	8
9	6	(Italy) Giancarlo Fisichella	Renault	1:21.333	+1.451	9
10	4	(Japan) Takuma Sato	BAR-Honda	1:21.787	+1.905	10
11	15	(Austria) Christian Klien	Red Bull-Cosworth	1:21.937	+2.055	11
12	8	(Germany) Nick Heidfeld	Williams-BMW	1:22.086	+2.204	12
13	14	(United Kingdom) David Coulthard	Red Bull-Cosworth	1:22.279	+2.397	13
14	12	(Brazil) Felipe Massa	Sauber-Petronas	1:22.565	+2.683	14
15	11	(Canada) Jacques Villeneuve	Sauber-Petronas	1:22.866	+2.984	15
16	7	(Australia) Mark Webber	Williams-BMW	1:23.495	+3.613	16
17	21	(Netherlands) Christijan Albers	Minardi-Cosworth	1:24.443	+4.561	17
18	19	(India) Narain Karthikeyan	Jordan-Toyota	1:25.057	+5.175	18
19	20	(Monaco) Robert Doornbos	Minardi-Cosworth	1:25.484	+5.602	19
20	18	(Portugal) Tiago Monteiro	Jordan-Toyota	No time		20^{1}

Notes

- ^1 – Tiago Monteiro received a 10-place grid penalty for an engine change.

=== Race ===
Pos	No	Driver	Constructor	Tyre	Laps	Time/Retired	Grid	Points
1	9	(Finland) Kimi Räikkönen	McLaren-Mercedes	MI	70	1:37:25.552	4	10
2	1	(Germany) Michael Schumacher	Ferrari	B	70	+35.581	1	8
3	17	(Germany) Ralf Schumacher	Toyota	MI	70	+36.129	5	6
4	16	(Italy) Jarno Trulli	Toyota	MI	70	+54.221	3	5
5	3	(United Kingdom) Jenson Button	BAR-Honda	MI	70	+58.832	8	4
6	8	(Germany) Nick Heidfeld	Williams-BMW	MI	70	+1:08.375	12	3
7	7	(Australia) Mark Webber	Williams-BMW	MI	69	+1 Lap	16	2
8	4	(Japan) Takuma Sato	BAR-Honda	MI	69	+1 Lap	10	1
9	6	(Italy) Giancarlo Fisichella	Renault	MI	69	+1 Lap	9	
10	2	(Brazil) Rubens Barrichello	Ferrari	B	69	+1 Lap	7	
11	5	(Spain) Fernando Alonso	Renault	MI	69	+1 Lap	6	
12	19	(India) Narain Karthikeyan	Jordan-Toyota	B	67	+3 Laps	18	
13	18	(Portugal) Tiago Monteiro	Jordan-Toyota	B	66	+4 Laps	20	
14	12	(Brazil) Felipe Massa	Sauber-Petronas	MI	63	+7 Laps	14	
NC	21	(Netherlands) Christijan Albers	Minardi-Cosworth	B	59	+11 Laps	17	
Ret	11	(Canada) Jacques Villeneuve	Sauber-Petronas	MI	56	Engine	15	
Ret	10	(Colombia) Juan Pablo Montoya	McLaren-Mercedes	MI	41	Driveshaft	2	
Ret	20	(Monaco) Robert Doornbos	Minardi-Cosworth	B	26	Hydraulics	19	
Ret	14	(United Kingdom) David Coulthard	Red Bull-Cosworth	MI	0	Suspension	13	
Ret	15	(Austria) Christian Klien	Red Bull-Cosworth	MI	0	Collision	11	

== Championship standings after the race ==
Drivers' Championship standings

	Pos	Driver	Points
	1	(Spain) Fernando Alonso	87
	2	(Finland) Kimi Räikkönen	61
	3	(Germany) Michael Schumacher	55
2	4	(Italy) Jarno Trulli	36
1	5	(Colombia) Juan Pablo Montoya	34

Constructors' Championship standings

Pos	Constructor	Points
1	(France) Renault	117
2	(United Kingdom) McLaren-Mercedes	105
3	(Italy) Ferrari	86
4	(Japan) Toyota	68
5	(United Kingdom) Williams-BMW	52

- Note: Only the top five positions are included for both sets of standings.

== See also ==
- 2005 Hungaroring GP2 Series round

Previous race: 2005 German Grand Prix	FIA Formula One World Championship; 2005 season	Next race: 2005 Turkish Grand Prix
Previous race: 2004 Hungarian Grand Prix	Hungarian Grand Prix	Next race: 2006 Hungarian Grand Prix
