= 2005 Spanish Grand Prix =

Coordinates: 41°34′12″N 2°15′40″E

Race 5 of 19 in the 2005 Formula One World Championship
← Previous race	Next race →

Race details
- Date: May 8, 2005
- Official name: Formula 1 Gran Premio Marlboro de España 2005
- Location: Circuit de Catalunya, Montmeló, Catalonia, Spain
- Course: Permanent racing facility
- Course length: 4.627 km (2.875 mi)
- Distance: 66 laps, 305.256 km (189.677 mi)
- Weather: Sunny, warm
- Attendance: 115,900

Pole position
Driver	(Finland) Kimi Räikkönen	McLaren-Mercedes
- Time: 2:31.421 (aggregate)

Fastest lap
Driver	(Italy) Giancarlo Fisichella	Renault
- Time: 1:15.641 on lap 66

Podium
First	(Finland) Kimi Räikkönen	McLaren-Mercedes
Second	(Spain) Fernando Alonso	Renault
Third	(Italy) Jarno Trulli	Toyota

The 2005 Spanish Grand Prix (formally the Formula 1 Gran Premio Marlboro de España 2005) was a Formula One motor race, held on 8 May 2005 at Circuit de Catalunya in Montmeló, Spain.

== Report ==
=== Background ===
The BAR-Honda team did not take part in this race, serving the first of a two race ban following irregularities at the San Marino Grand Prix.

=== Qualifying ===
Kimi Räikkönen set pole position while Mark Webber claimed his second front row start, leaving championship leader Fernando Alonso on the second row in third.

=== Race ===
Right from the start Räikkönen started pulling away at a blistering pace, setting the fastest lap thirteen times in only twenty four laps. Alonso's tyres wore down and he was forced to take care of them and come home in second place, never taking the lead from Räikkönen.

Webber had a dismal start, losing second and then third to Alonso and Ralf Schumacher, respectively. After the first round of pitstops he lost three positions and had to battle his way back to finish in sixth. Alonso's teammate Giancarlo Fisichella moved around constantly in the field, but managed to end up in fifth from sixth on the grid.

Jarno Trulli had a good race, ending up on the podium in third ahead of his teammate Ralf Schumacher, who fell behind after the first round of pitstops. Meanwhile, Räikkönen's teammate Juan Pablo Montoya had an average race, moving around in the field but still only managing a seventh place. It was his return from a two-race absence to recover from a shoulder injury. David Coulthard claimed the final points-paying position in eighth after starting from ninth.

Some of the retirements included Michael Schumacher, whose tyre failed on lap 47, his third retirement of the year. Jacques Villeneuve also had to retire on lap 52 after a water leak resulted in his engine overheating.

This was Räikkönen's first victory of 2005.

== Friday drivers ==
The bottom 6 teams in the 2004 Constructors' Championship were entitled to run a third car in free practice on Friday. These drivers drove on Friday but did not compete in qualifying or the race.

Constructor	No	Driver
McLaren-Mercedes	35	(Spain) Pedro de la Rosa
Sauber-Petronas		none
Red Bull-Cosworth	37	(Austria) Christian Klien
Toyota	38	(Brazil) Ricardo Zonta
Jordan-Toyota	39	(Monaco) Robert Doornbos
Minardi-Cosworth		none

== Classification ==
=== Qualifying ===
Pos	No	Driver	Constructor	Q1	Q2	Total	Gap	Grid
1	9	(Finland) Kimi Räikkönen	McLaren-Mercedes	1:14.819	1:16.602	2:31.421		1
2	7	(Australia) Mark Webber	Williams-BMW	1:15.042	1:16.626	2:31.668	+0.247	2
3	5	(Spain) Fernando Alonso	Renault	1:14.811	1:16.880	2:31.691	+0.270	3
4	17	(Germany) Ralf Schumacher	Toyota	1:14.870	1:17.047	2:31.917	+0.496	4
5	16	(Italy) Jarno Trulli	Toyota	1:14.795	1:17.200	2:31.995	+0.574	5
6	6	(Italy) Giancarlo Fisichella	Renault	1:15.601	1:17.229	2:32.830	+1.409	6
7	10	(Colombia) Juan Pablo Montoya	McLaren-Mercedes	1:15.902	1:17.570	2:33.472	+2.051	7
8	1	(Germany) Michael Schumacher	Ferrari	1:15.398	1:18.153	2:33.551	+2.130	8
9	14	(United Kingdom) David Coulthard	Red Bull-Cosworth	1:15.795	1:18.373	2:34.168	+2.747	9
10	12	(Brazil) Felipe Massa	Sauber-Petronas	1:15.863	1:18.361	2:34.224	+2.803	10
11	15	(Italy) Vitantonio Liuzzi	Red Bull-Cosworth	1:16.288	1:19.014	2:35.302	+3.881	11
12	11	(Canada) Jacques Villeneuve	Sauber-Petronas	1:16.794	1:19.686	2:36.480	+5.059	12
13	19	(India) Narain Karthikeyan	Jordan-Toyota	1:18.557	1:20.711	2:39.268	+7.847	13
14	18	(Portugal) Tiago Monteiro	Jordan-Toyota	1:19.040	1:20.903	2:39.943	+8.522	18^{4}
15	21	(Netherlands) Christijan Albers	Minardi-Cosworth	1:19.563	1:21.578	2:41.141	+9.720	14
16	20	(Austria) Patrick Friesacher	Minardi-Cosworth	1:20.306	1:22.453	2:42.759	+11.338	15
17	8	(Germany) Nick Heidfeld	Williams-BMW	1:15.038	No time^{1}	—	—	17^{3}
18	2	(Brazil) Rubens Barrichello	Ferrari	1:15.746	No time^{1}	—	—	16^{2}

Notes

- ^1 – Nick Heidfeld and Rubens Barrichello did not set a time in Q2, to save fuel and tyres.
- ^2 – Rubens Barrichello received a 10-place grid penalty for an engine change.
- ^3 – Nick Heidfeld received a 20-place grid penalty for engine changes.
- ^4 – Tiago Monteiro will start from the back of the grid due to an engine change in parc fermé.

=== Race ===
Pos	No	Driver	Constructor	Tyre	Laps	Time/Retired	Grid	Points
1	9	(Finland) Kimi Räikkönen	McLaren-Mercedes	MI	66	1:27:16.830	1	10
2	5	(Spain) Fernando Alonso	Renault	MI	66	+27.652	3	8
3	16	(Italy) Jarno Trulli	Toyota	MI	66	+45.947	5	6
4	17	(Germany) Ralf Schumacher	Toyota	MI	66	+46.719	4	5
5	6	(Italy) Giancarlo Fisichella	Renault	MI	66	+57.936	6	4
6	7	(Australia) Mark Webber	Williams-BMW	MI	66	+1:08.542	2	3
7	10	(Colombia) Juan Pablo Montoya	McLaren-Mercedes	MI	65	+1 lap	7	2
8	14	(United Kingdom) David Coulthard	Red Bull-Cosworth	MI	65	+1 lap	9	1
9	2	(Brazil) Rubens Barrichello	Ferrari	B	65	+1 lap	16	
10	8	(Germany) Nick Heidfeld	Williams-BMW	MI	65	+1 lap	17	
11	12	(Brazil) Felipe Massa	Sauber-Petronas	MI	63	Wheel rim	10	
12	18	(Portugal) Tiago Monteiro	Jordan-Toyota	B	63	+3 laps	18	
13	19	(India) Narain Karthikeyan	Jordan-Toyota	B	63	+3 laps	13	
Ret	11	(Canada) Jacques Villeneuve	Sauber-Petronas	MI	51	Engine	12	
Ret	1	(Germany) Michael Schumacher	Ferrari	B	46	Puncture	8	
Ret	21	(Netherlands) Christijan Albers	Minardi-Cosworth	B	19	Gearbox	14	
Ret	20	(Austria) Patrick Friesacher	Minardi-Cosworth	B	11	Spun off	15	
Ret	15	(Italy) Vitantonio Liuzzi	Red Bull-Cosworth	MI	9	Spun off	11	

== Championship standings after the race ==
Drivers' Championship standings

	Pos	Driver	Points
	1	(Spain) Fernando Alonso	44
	2	(Italy) Jarno Trulli	26
8	3	(Finland) Kimi Räikkönen	17
1	4	(Italy) Giancarlo Fisichella	14
1	5	(Germany) Ralf Schumacher	14

Constructors' Championship standings

	Pos	Constructor	Points
	1	(France) Renault	58
	2	(Japan) Toyota	40
	3	(United Kingdom) McLaren-Mercedes	37
1	4	(United Kingdom) Williams-BMW	21
1	5	(Italy) Ferrari	18

- Note: Only the top five positions are included for both sets of standings.

== See also ==
- 2005 Catalunya GP2 Series round

Previous race: 2005 San Marino Grand Prix	FIA Formula One World Championship; 2005 season	Next race: 2005 Monaco Grand Prix
Previous race: 2004 Spanish Grand Prix	Spanish Grand Prix	Next race: 2006 Spanish Grand Prix
