= 2005 San Marino Grand Prix =

4th round of the 2005 Formula One season

Coordinates: 44°20′38″N 11°43′00″E

Race 4 of 19 in the 2005 Formula One World Championship
← Previous race	Next race →

Race details
- Date: April 24, 2005
- Official name: Formula 1 Gran Premio Foster's di San Marino 2005
- Location: Autodromo Enzo e Dino Ferrari, Imola, Emilia-Romagna, Italy
- Course: Permanent racing facility
- Course length: 4.933 km (3.065 miles)
- Distance: 62 laps, 305.609 km (189.897 miles)
- Weather: Warm and cloudy, Air: 19 °C (66 °F), Track 21 °C (70 °F)

Pole position
Driver	(Finland) Kimi Räikkönen	McLaren-Mercedes
- Time: 2:42.880 (aggregate)

Fastest lap
Driver	(Germany) Michael Schumacher	Ferrari
- Time: 1:21.858 on lap 48

Podium
First	(Spain) Fernando Alonso	Renault
Second	(Germany) Michael Schumacher	Ferrari
Third	(Austria) Alexander Wurz (Note: The podium ceremony was conducted with Jenson Button in 3rd place, prior to his disqualification.)	McLaren-Mercedes

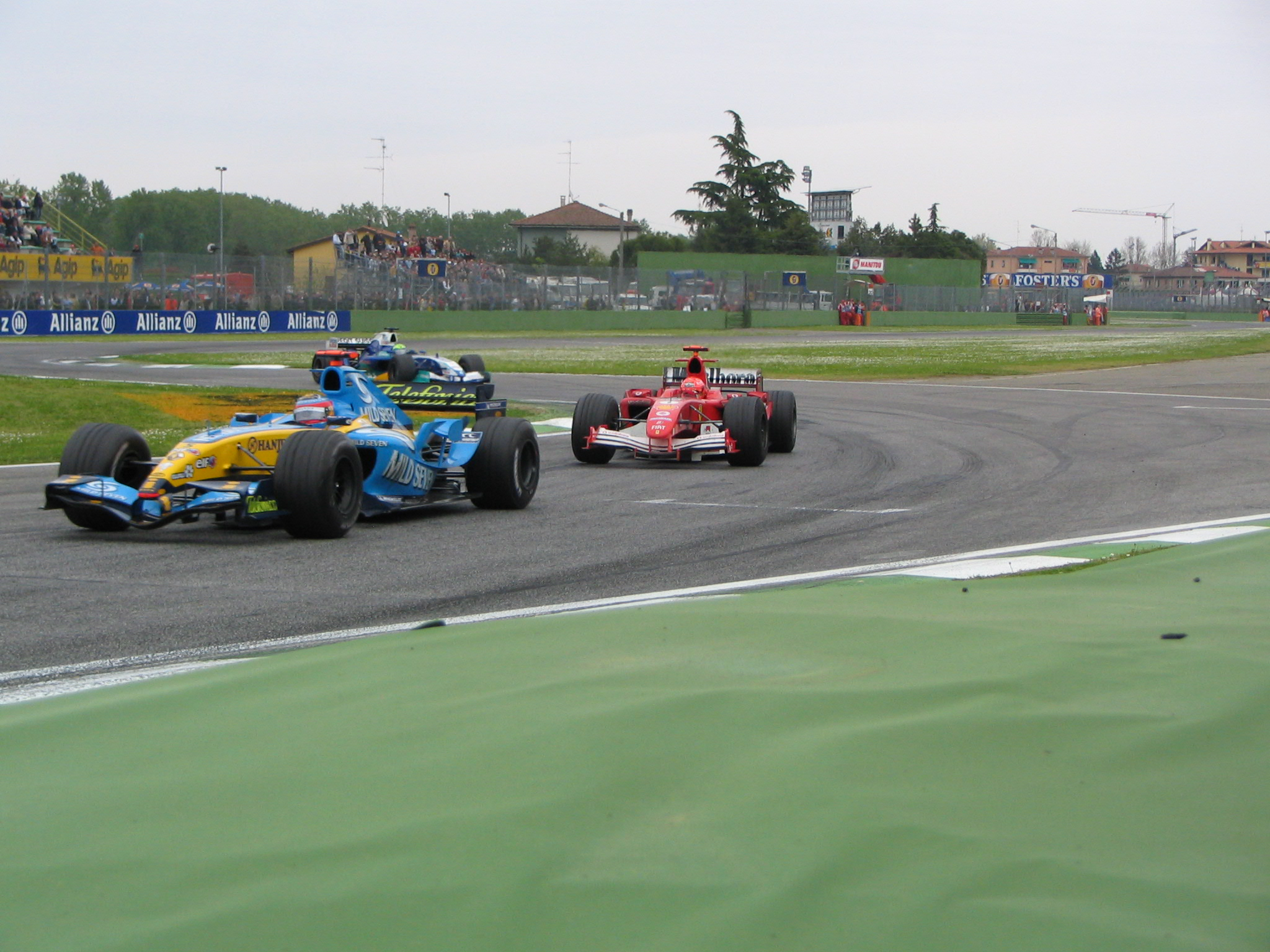
Alonso and Schumacher battle for the lead in the closing stages of the race.

The 2005 San Marino Grand Prix (formally the Formula 1 Gran Premio Foster's di San Marino 2005) was a Formula One motor race held on 24 April 2005 at the Autodromo Enzo e Dino Ferrari in Imola, Italy. The 62-lap race was the fourth round of the 2005 Formula One season, and the 25th running of the San Marino Grand Prix.

The race was won by Renault driver Fernando Alonso, who extended his lead in the Drivers' Championship after his third win and fourth podium from four races and thus ended the Schumacher-clan winning streak from 1999 to 2004. Defending World Champion Michael Schumacher finished the race in second position for the Ferrari team, only two-tenths of a second behind Alonso having challenged him for the win late into the race having started thirteenth on the grid due a mistake in qualifying. BAR driver Jenson Button crossed the line in third place, but his team were subsequently disqualified for underweight cars; third place was then awarded to McLaren driver Alexander Wurz, who made his first Grand Prix start since being dropped by Benetton at the end of the 2000 season.

Pole position was taken by McLaren driver Kimi Räikkönen, using the aggregate system which was in the rules at the start of the 2005 season. He led the race from the start until his retirement on lap 9 due to a driveshaft failure. Alonso took the lead and kept it except during the pit stop phases when it was held by Button, and later Schumacher when he overtook Button.

== Friday drivers ==
The bottom 6 teams in the 2004 Constructors' Championship were entitled to run a third car in free practice on Friday. These drivers drove on Friday but did not compete in qualifying or the race.

Constructor	No	Driver
McLaren-Mercedes	35	(Spain) Pedro de la Rosa
Sauber-Petronas		-
Red Bull-Cosworth	37	(Austria) Christian Klien
Toyota	38	(Brazil) Ricardo Zonta
Jordan-Toyota	39	(Monaco) Robert Doornbos
Minardi-Cosworth		-

== Report ==
=== Background ===
Vitantonio Liuzzi replaced Christian Klien in the second Red Bull car, for this and the next three races; after unanimous agreement between the teams, Klien was allowed to drive car #37 for Red Bull in the Friday practice sessions. Alexander Wurz drove the second McLaren-Mercedes car, in place of the injured Juan Pablo Montoya, marking Wurz's first full Grand Prix entry since the 2000 Malaysian Grand Prix. During the first qualifying session on Saturday, Red Bull announced that they would use Ferrari engines for two years, beginning from the 2006 season.

=== Race ===
Räikkönen led from pole, pulling out a gap of several seconds, before his McLaren retired on lap nine with driveshaft problems. Alonso took over the lead, and was unchallenged until lap 50, when Michael Schumacher emerged from the pits just behind him. Schumacher had started 13th, and had been unable to pass Jarno Trulli for 20 laps, until the Italian pitted allowing Schumacher to increase his pace. After pitting himself, he emerged in third place ahead of Trulli and started to catch race leader Alonso. He caught up with second place driver Jenson Button and overtook him, overturning a 20-second gap in 13 laps. After the second round of pit-stops he emerged from the pits seconds behind Alonso. The next 12 laps saw the two battle for the lead but Schumacher was unable to overtake Alonso who took the race victory. Third was Button, followed by Wurz's McLaren, Takuma Sato, Jacques Villeneuve, Trulli and Ralf Schumacher. Ralf was later given a 25-second penalty as he was released into the path of Nick Heidfeld; this temporarily dropped him to 11th place.

=== Post-race ===
During checks after the race it was found that Button's car had been under the 600 kg minimum weight requirement when drained of fuel. The race stewards cleared Button, as they believed data provided by BAR-Honda was sufficient to prove that they had been operating inside the rules, but the FIA appealed sending them to court. They were found guilty, but the FIA's preferred penalty of having the team disqualified from the championship for the year was not carried through, and they were given a two-race ban, starting from the next round in Spain. In addition, Button's teammate Sato, who had finished 5th on the track, was disqualified from the race despite his car not being found to be underweight. Wurz was thus promoted to third, followed by Villeneuve, Trulli, Heidfeld, Mark Webber and Liuzzi.

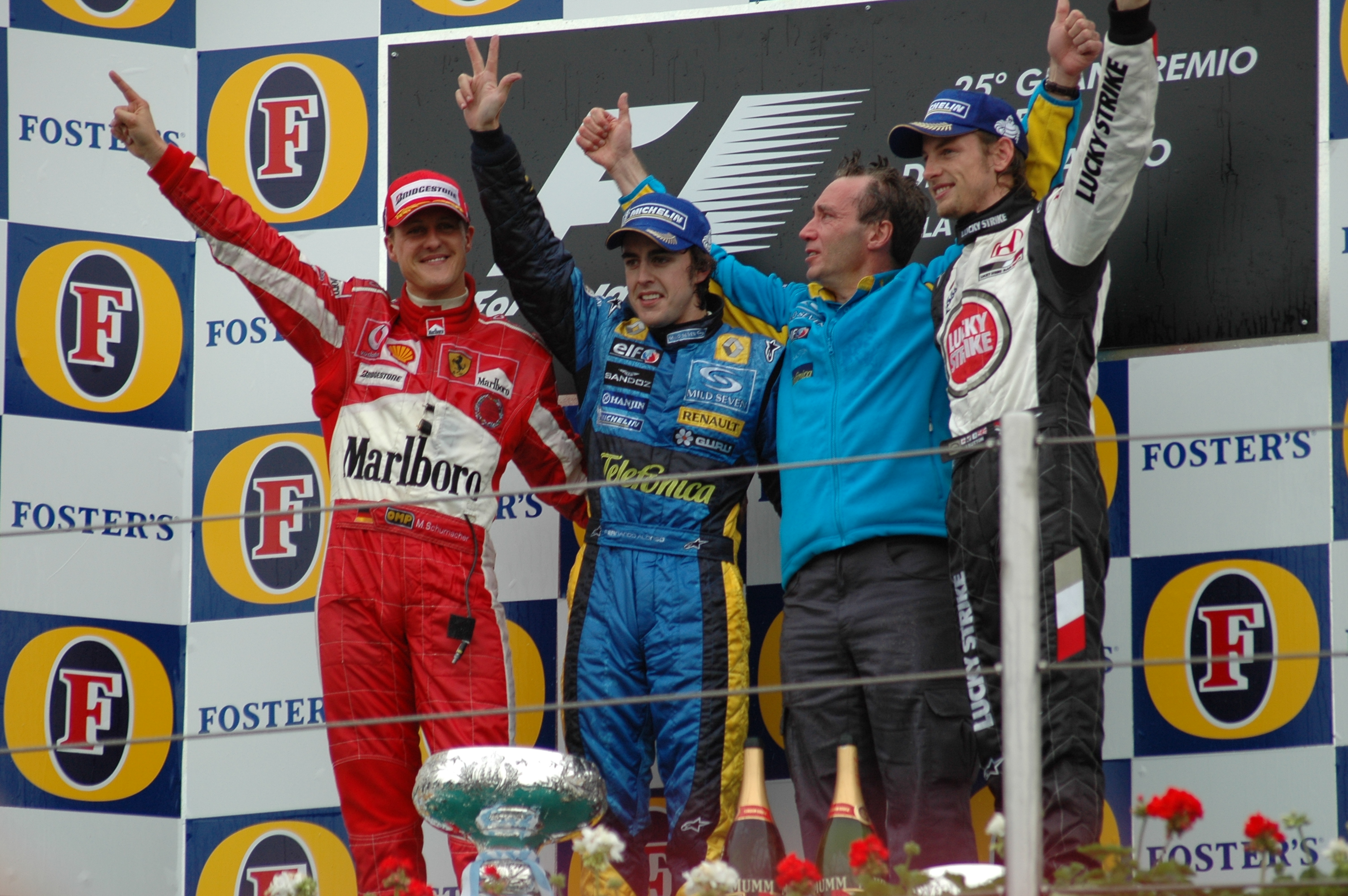
Fernando Alonso, Michael Schumacher and Jenson Button celebrate on the podium. Button was later disqualified from the race along with BAR team-mate Takuma Sato.

== Classification ==
=== Qualifying ===
Qualifying times from both Saturday and Sunday morning.

Pos	No	Driver	Constructor	Q1	Q2	Total	Gap	Grid
1	9	(Finland) Kimi Räikkönen	McLaren-Mercedes	1:19.886	1:22.994	2:42.880		1
2	5	(Spain) Fernando Alonso	Renault	1:19.889	1:23.552	2:43.441	+0.561	2
3	3	(United Kingdom) Jenson Button	BAR-Honda	1:20.464	1:23.641	2:44.105	+1.225	3
4	7	(Australia) Mark Webber	Williams-BMW	1:20.442	1:24.069	2:44.511	+1.631	4
5	16	(Italy) Jarno Trulli	Toyota	1:20.492	1:24.026	2:44.518	+1.638	5
6	4	(Japan) Takuma Sato	BAR-Honda	1:20.851	1:23.807	2:44.658	+1.778	6
7	10	(Austria) Alexander Wurz	McLaren-Mercedes	1:20.632	1:24.057	2:44.689	+1.809	7
8	12	(Brazil) Felipe Massa	Sauber-Petronas	1:20.593	1:24.337	2:44.930	+2.050	18^{2}
9	8	(Germany) Nick Heidfeld	Williams-BMW	1:20.807	1:24.389	2:45.196	+2.316	8
10	2	(Brazil) Rubens Barrichello	Ferrari	1:20.892	1:24.351	2:45.240	+2.363	9
11	17	(Germany) Ralf Schumacher	Toyota	1:20.994	1:24.422	2:45.416	+2.536	10
12	11	(Canada) Jacques Villeneuve	Sauber-Petronas	1:20.999	1:25.260	2:46.259	+3.379	11
13	6	(Italy) Giancarlo Fisichella	Renault	1:21.708	1:25.002	2:46.710	+3.830	12
14	1	(Germany) Michael Schumacher	Ferrari	1:20.260	1:26.984	2:47.244	+4.364	13
15	14	(United Kingdom) David Coulthard	Red Bull-Cosworth	1:21.632	1:26.438	2:48.070	+5.190	14
16	15	(Italy) Vitantonio Liuzzi	Red Bull-Cosworth	1:21.804	1:26.351	2:48.155	+5.275	15
17	19	(India) Narain Karthikeyan	Jordan-Toyota	1:23.123	1:28.976	2:52.099	+9.219	16
18	18	(Portugal) Tiago Monteiro	Jordan-Toyota	1:25.100	1:29.152	2:54.252	+11.372	17
19	20	(Austria) Patrick Friesacher	Minardi-Cosworth	1:26.484	1:30.564	2:57.048	+14.168	19^{2}
20	21	(Netherlands) Christijan Albers	Minardi-Cosworth	1:25.921	No time^{1}			20^{2}

Notes

- ^1 – Christijan Albers was left without a time in Q2 after spinning off the track.
- ^2 – Felipe Massa, Patrick Friesacher and Christijan Albers received a 10-place grid penalty for engine changes.

=== Race ===
Pos	No	Driver	Constructor	Tyre	Laps	Time/Retired	Grid	Points
1	5	(Spain) Fernando Alonso	Renault	MI	62	1:27:41.921	2	10
2	1	(Germany) Michael Schumacher	Ferrari	B	62	+0.215	13	8
3	10	(Austria) Alexander Wurz	McLaren-Mercedes	MI	62	+27.554	7	6
4	11	(Canada) Jacques Villeneuve	Sauber-Petronas	MI	62	+1:04.442	11	5
5	16	(Italy) Jarno Trulli	Toyota	MI	62	+1:10.258	5	4
6	8	(Germany) Nick Heidfeld	Williams-BMW	MI	62	+1:11.282	8	3
7	7	(Australia) Mark Webber	Williams-BMW	MI	62	+1:23.297	4	2
8	15	(Italy) Vitantonio Liuzzi	Red Bull-Cosworth	MI	62	+1:23.764	15	1
9	17	(Germany) Ralf Schumacher	Toyota	MI	62	+1:35.841^{3}	10	
10	12	(Brazil) Felipe Massa	Sauber-Petronas	MI	61	+1 Lap	18	
11	14	(United Kingdom) David Coulthard	Red Bull-Cosworth	MI	61	+1 Lap	14	
12	19	(India) Narain Karthikeyan	Jordan-Toyota	B	61	+1 Lap	16	
13	18	(Portugal) Tiago Monteiro	Jordan-Toyota	B	60	+2 Laps	17	
Ret	21	(Netherlands) Christijan Albers	Minardi-Cosworth	B	20	Hydraulics	20	
Ret	2	(Brazil) Rubens Barrichello	Ferrari	B	18	Electrical	9	
Ret	9	(Finland) Kimi Räikkönen	McLaren-Mercedes	MI	9	Driveshaft	1	
Ret	20	(Austria) Patrick Friesacher	Minardi-Cosworth	B	8	Clutch	19	
Ret	6	(Italy) Giancarlo Fisichella	Renault	MI	5	Accident	12	
DSQ	3	(United Kingdom) Jenson Button	BAR-Honda	MI	62	Fuel/Underweight (+10.481)^{4}	3	
DSQ	4	(Japan) Takuma Sato	BAR-Honda	MI	62	Fuel (+34.783)^{4}	6	

Notes

- ^3 – Post-race, Ralf Schumacher was penalised 25 seconds for being released unsafely into the path of Nick Heidfeld from his second pitstop; Toyota withdrew their initial appeal before the hearing.
- ^4 – Also post-race, Jenson Button's car was found to be 4.99 kg (11 lb) underweight; stewards initially accepted BAR's explanation as a fuel system anomaly on April 25. However, on May 5, an FIA court of appeal disqualified both BAR cars and banned them from the next two races for "highly regrettable negligence and lack of transparency", noting that BAR's fuel system effectively "used fuel as ballast", illegal under current Formula One regulations.

== Championship standings after the race ==
Drivers' Championship standings

	Pos	Driver	Points
	1	(Spain) Fernando Alonso	36
	2	(Italy) Jarno Trulli	20
	3	(Italy) Giancarlo Fisichella	10
10	4	(Germany) Michael Schumacher	10
5	5	(Germany) Nick Heidfeld	9

Constructors' Championship standings

	Pos	Constructor	Points
	1	(France) Renault	46
	2	(Japan) Toyota	29
	3	(United Kingdom) McLaren-Mercedes	25
2	4	(Italy) Ferrari	18
1	5	(United Kingdom) Williams-BMW	18

- Note: Only the top five positions are included for both sets of standings.

== See also ==
- 2005 Imola GP2 Series round

== Notes ==
Previous race: 2005 Bahrain Grand Prix	FIA Formula One World Championship; 2005 season	Next race: 2005 Spanish Grand Prix
Previous race: 2004 San Marino Grand Prix	San Marino Grand Prix	Next race: 2006 San Marino Grand Prix
