= Minardi PS05 =

Formula One racing car

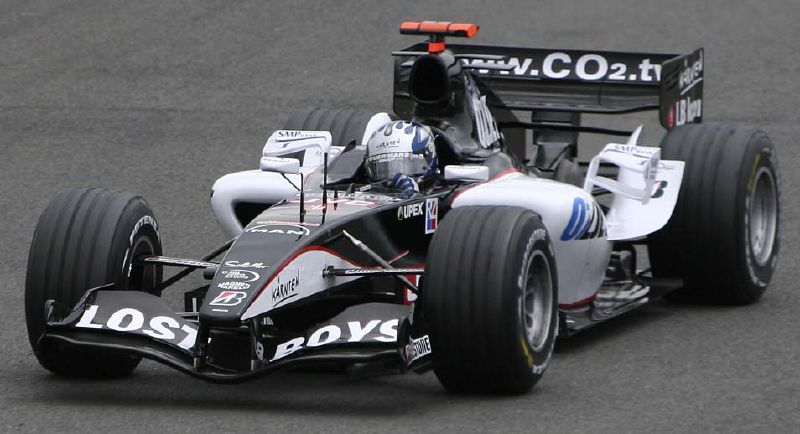
- Patrick Friesacher driving the Minardi PS05 at the 2005 British Grand Prix.
- Category: Formula One
- Constructor: Minardi
- Designers: Gabriele Tredozi (Technical Director); Andrew Tilley (Deputy Technical Director); Sandro Parini (Chief Designer); Andrea Rocchetto (Chief Aerodynamicist)
- Predecessor: PS04B
- Successor: Toro Rosso STR1

Technical specifications
- Chassis: Carbon-fibre and aluminium honeycomb composite monocoque
- Suspension (front): Upper/lower composite-reinforced wishbones, pushrod-activated torsion springs, mechanical anti-roll bars
- Suspension (rear): Upper/lower composite-reinforced wishbones, pushrod-activated torsion rockers, mechanical anti-roll bars
- Wheelbase: 3097 mm
- Engine: Cosworth TJ2005 3.0 litres (183 cubic inches) 90° V10 naturally aspirated mid-engined, longitudinally-mounted
- Transmission: Minardi with Red Bull internals 6-speed longitudinally-mounted, semi-automatic gearbox, Minardi hydraulic differential
- Battery: Midac
- Power: 860 hp @ 18,300 rpm
- Fuel: Elf
- Lubricants: Silkolene
- Brakes: Hitco
- Tyres: Bridgestone Potenza; OZ Wheels (front and rear): 13"

Competition history
- Notable entrants: Minardi F1 Team
- Notable drivers: 20. (Austria) Patrick Friesacher; 20. (Monaco) Robert Doornbos (Note: Dutch-born Robert Doornbos competed under a Monegasque license due to FIA license regulation in 2005.); 21. (Netherlands) Christijan Albers
- Debut: 2005 San Marino Grand Prix
- Last event: 2005 Chinese Grand Prix
Races	Wins	Poles	F/Laps
16	0	0	0
- Constructors' Championships: 0
- Drivers' Championships: 0

The Minardi PS05 is a Formula One racing car used by Minardi F1 Team during the 2005 season and was the final car to be created by the team. It failed to be much of an improvement over its predecessor, as the team finished last in the standings for the third consecutive season. The car was launched on 15 April 2005 at Mugello in Italy.

== Overview ==
The PS05 was designed by Gabriele Tredozi and Andrea Rocchetto and was driven by rookies Christijan Albers, Patrick Friesacher (until the British Grand Prix) and Robert Doornbos (from the German Grand Prix onwards). It was the last Formula One car developed by Minardi before the sale of the team, which from 2006 became known as the Red Bull Racing sister team, Scuderia Toro Rosso. It debuted at the San Marino Grand Prix, in the three races beforehand the team used the Minardi PS04B.

The team earned their second double-points finish in the team's 20-year history at the controversial United States Grand Prix, an achievement only brought to fruition by the withdrawal of all teams using the Michelin tyres; only 6 cars participated in the race.

For the third straight season, Minardi ran on Bridgestone Potenza tires, with the power trains supplied by Cosworth. Enrico Toccacelo and Chanoch Nissany drove a third car during practice sessions. After the end of the season, Juan Cáceres, Roldán Rodríguez, Davide Rigon, Luca Filippi and Katherine Legge drove the PS05 during test sessions at Vallelunga.

== Performance and development ==
The PS05 was Minardi's first completely new car since the PS02. Unlike in the previous two years, the car was designed specifically to be fitted with the Cosworth TJ2005 engine. Team owner Paul Stoddart and founder Gian Carlo Minardi both expected the PS05 to be fighting for positions with the Jordans. The carbon fibre chassis featured heavily sculpted sidepods and updated aerodynamics, which included innovative double plane winglets aimed at reducing drag and increasing downforce levels.

Development was slow, but stood to testament of the team's ability to design cars on a small budget. The PS05's first upgrade came in the Hungarian Grand Prix, when the team introduced a large vertical slit, a first as well and finishing off the year was a multi-profiled front wing. The front wing was, along with Renault and Jordan, a first and would be adopted by most teams by the end of the decade.

=== Engine ===
The TJ2005 Series 10 engine featured aluminium engine block and cylinder heads with aluminium alloy pistons and a steel crankshaft. It had a capacity of 2998 cc and delivered about 860 bhp at 18,300 rpm, about 60 bhp more than the previous season's CK2004 engine. It was the same unit as the one used by Red Bull during the first part of the season, as the Austrian team received a more powerful version for the United States Grand Prix onwards.

== Racing history ==
In terms of performance, the car was regularly towards the back of the field, with occasional midfield finishes. It performed better at high downforce circuits such as Monaco and Hungary.

The car showed a poor performance in its debut in Imola, with lap times six seconds slower on average than the frontrunners and one second behind other backmarkers. Although both drivers complained about a lack of grip, team owner Paul Stoddart believed the potential of the new car bode "very well for the future."

Minardi were faster than Jordan at the Monaco Grand Prix, as both drivers set faster lap times during qualifying. Albers brought the PS05 to its first complete race, although five laps behind the race winner. Both cars qualified in front of the Jordans again at the German and Belgian Grand Prix. Albers also started in front of both Jordans in Hungaroring.

Only once in normal circumstances did the PS05 qualify in front of a team besides Jordan. In Montréal, Albers was 0.03 seconds faster than Christian Klien of Red Bull for a 15th place start.

At the United States Grand Prix, Albers and Friesacher finished one lap behind fourth place in a six-car race. In Suzuka, Albers took advantage of the weather conditions during qualifying to secure 13th place on the grid, but nothing came of it. The team weren't able to finish a single race within the same lap as the race winners.

=== Reliability ===
At the San Marino Grand Prix, both drivers retired within the first 20 laps of the race: Friesacher's car had a broken clutch shaft, while the no. 21 car had a fluid leak that could potentially ruin the gearbox as well. The PS05 retired due to gearbox-related issues again in Spain, while minor gearbox problems also happened in Monaco, Europe, Canada, United States, Great Britain, Turkey and China.

Both cars stalled at the start of the Spanish Grand Prix, due to electronic control problems. At the French Grand Prix, the team had its third double DNF of the season, with both drivers suffering from a left rear tyre puncture caused by the valve caps not being refitted after the drivers' second pit stops.

The PS05 also suffered from hydraulic problems, which caused retirements at the Canadian and Hungarian Grand Prix. A broken oil pipe took Doornbos out of the Brazilian Grand Prix, while Albers suffered a sensor failure that compromised the performance of the differential and traction control system, affecting his pace in Interlagos.

Of the fifteen races the PS05 was used, it retired at eight races, failed to classify at one race and finished twelve races. In comparison to its immediate predecessor, the PS04B, which retired from fifteen races and finished eighteen races, the PS05 was more reliable and yet finished lower on average.

The new Cosworth unit also proved to be much more reliable, as none of the team's retirements were due to engine issues.

== Sponsorship and livery ==
The PS05 featured the same black and white colour scheme from the previous seasons, with OzJet as the primary sponsor.

To mark their end at the final race, the 340th Grand Prix decals were placed on the engine cover.

== Results ==
(key)

Year	Entrant	Engine	Tyres	Drivers	1	2	3	4	5	6	7	8	9	10	11	12	13	14	15	16	17	18	19	Points	WCC
2005	Minardi F1 Team	Cosworth TJ2005 V10	B		AUS	MAL	BHR	SMR	ESP	MON	EUR	CAN	USA	FRA	GBR	GER	HUN	TUR	ITA	BEL	BRA	JPN	CHN	7	10th
2005	Minardi F1 Team	Cosworth TJ2005 V10	B	(Netherlands) Christijan Albers				Ret	Ret	14	17	11	5	Ret	18	13	NC	Ret	19	12	14	16	16^{†}	7	10th
2005	Minardi F1 Team	Cosworth TJ2005 V10	B	(Austria) Patrick Friesacher				Ret	Ret	Ret	18	Ret	6	Ret	19									7	10th
2005	Minardi F1 Team	Cosworth TJ2005 V10	B	(Monaco) Robert Doornbos												18	Ret	13	18	13	Ret	14	14^{†}	7	10th
