= Minardi PS04B =

Formula One racing car

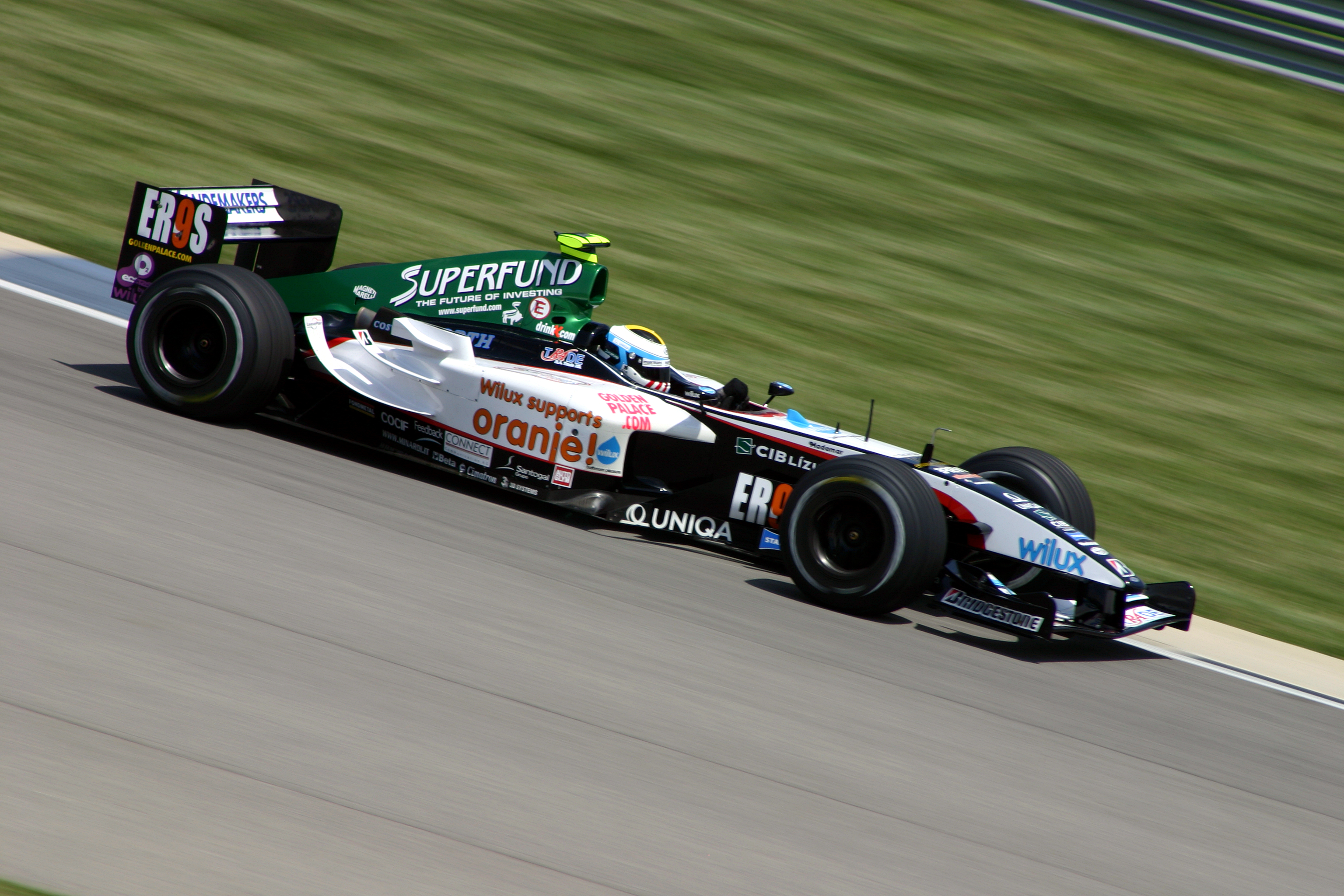
- Bas Leinders driving the Minardi PS04B during free practice for the 2004 United States Grand Prix.
- Category: Formula One
- Constructor: Minardi
- Designers: Gabriele Tredozi (Technical Director); Andrew Tilley (Deputy Technical Director); Sandro Parini (Chief Designer); Loïc Bigois (Chief Aerodynamicist)
- Predecessor: PS03; Arrows A23 (design predecessor)
- Successor: PS05

Technical specifications
- Chassis: Carbon-fibre and aluminium honeycomb composite monocoque
- Suspension (front): Upper/lower carbon-wrapped steel wishbones, pushrod-activated torsion springs/rockers front/rear, mechanical anti-roll bars + Sachs dampers (to Minardi specification)
- Suspension (rear): As front
- Length: 4,548 mm (179 in)
- Width: 1,800 mm (71 in)
- Height: 950 mm (37 in)
- Axle track: Front: 1,480 mm (58 in); Rear: 1,410 mm (56 in)
- Wheelbase: 3,097 mm (122 in)
- Engine: Cosworth CR-3L (updated 2002 specifications) 2,998 cc (183 cu in) 72° V10 naturally-aspirated rear mid-engine, longitudinally-mounted, steel crankshafts, aluminum engine block and heads and aluminum alloy pistons
- Transmission: Minardi 6-speed + 1 reverse longitudinally-mounted semi-automatic gearbox with titanium casing, hydraulic activation (Magneti Marelli ECU, Minardi software) with Minardi hydraulic/programmable differential units
- Power: 800 hp @ 18,000 rpm
- Weight: 600 kg (1,323 lb) including driver and camera
- Fuel: Elf
- Lubricants: Elf/CPC
- Tyres: Bridgestone Potenza 4-line grooved dry slicks, treaded intermediate and full-wets O.Z. Racing forged magnesium (13.0 in × 12.0 in (330 mm × 305 mm) on front and 13.0 in × 13.7 in (330 mm × 348 mm) on rear)

Competition history
- Notable entrants: Wilux Minardi Cosworth; Minardi Cosworth; Minardi F1 Team (2005)
- Notable drivers: 20. (Italy) Gianmaria Bruni; 20. (Austria) Patrick Friesacher; 21. (Hungary) Zsolt Baumgartner; 21. (Netherlands) Christijan Albers
- Debut: 2004 Australian Grand Prix
Races	Wins	Poles	F/Laps
21	0	0	0
- Constructors' Championships: 0
- Drivers' Championships: 0

The Minardi PS04B was a Formula One race car used by Minardi Cosworth in the 2004 Formula One season and the first 3 rounds of the 2005 Formula One season.

== Background ==
In 2003 all of the Arrows A23 chassis and the full Arrows Grand Prix International intellectual property rights were bought by Minardi. The Arrows A23 was renamed the Minardi PS04 and in back-to-back tests it was found superior to the Minardi's PS03. Minardi however decided that they could not run a "pure-Arrows" and hence used the Arrows intellectual property, which included the new designs for a proposed Arrows A24 and the best elements from the PS03 and the Arrows A23/PS04 to develop the Minardi PS04B for the 2004 season.

Period reports even hinted that the PS04B was possibly based more closely on the Arrows A23 than Minardi might have been prepared to publicly admit.

== Racing history ==
The PS04B was driven by rookie Gianmaria Bruni, and Zsolt Baumgartner who had moved from Jordan. The team managed to earn their first point in two years, after Baumgartner finished 8th at the United States Grand Prix.

For 2005, Minardi used a PS04B chassis for the first three races of the season before they made a new PS05 chassis due to assembly problems. The engine name changed from CR-3L to CK2004, but it was basically the same engine.

== Sponsorship and livery ==
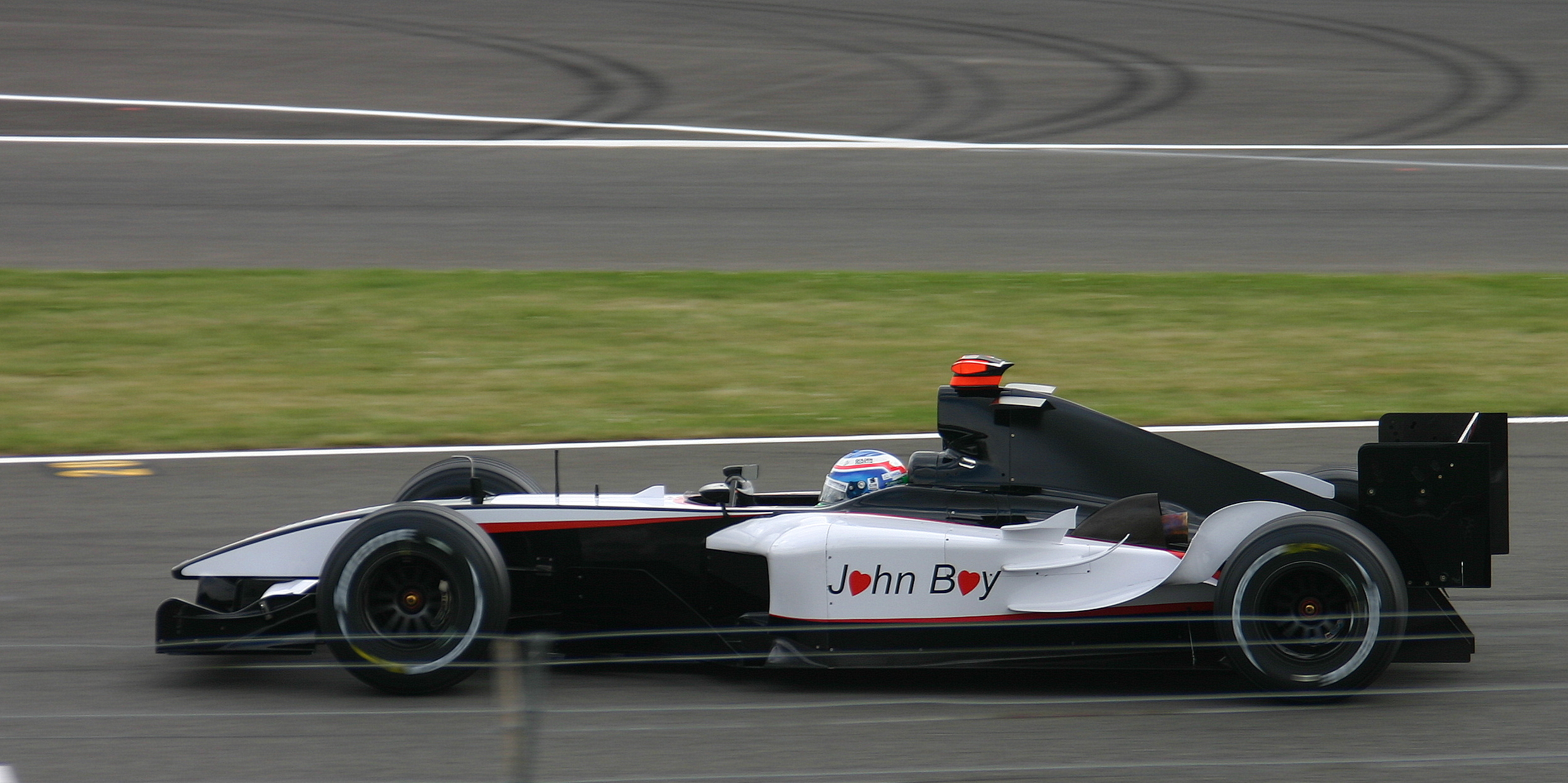
Bruni during the British Grand Prix

The team's black and white livery saw the addition of Superfund's deep green to the engine covers. The following season, it was removed.

During the San Marino Grand Prix, the sides of the car the Brazilian flag was displayed, along with the name "Ayrton Senna" and the word "Saudades". During the United States Grand Prix, Minardi's livery featured logos of Mandemakers Keukens and Goldenpalace.com.

During the British Grand Prix, the team ran with no sponsors, replacing them with the words "John Boy" in honor to Sporting Director John Walton, who died from a heart attack. At the 2005 Australian Grand Prix, the team celebrated 10 years of Melbourne holding a race at Albert Park; the logo was presented on the engine cover.

== Complete Formula One results ==
(key) (results in bold indicate pole position)

Year	Entrant	Engine	Tyres	Drivers	1	2	3	4	5	6	7	8	9	10	11	12	13	14	15	16	17	18	19	Points	WCC
2004	Minardi Cosworth	Cosworth V10	B		AUS	MAL	BHR	SMR	ESP	MON	EUR	CAN	USA	FRA	GBR	GER	HUN	BEL	ITA	CHN	JPN	BRA		1	10th
2004	Minardi Cosworth	Cosworth V10	B	(Italy) Gianmaria Bruni	NC	14	17	Ret	Ret	Ret	14	Ret	Ret	18^{†}	16	17	14	Ret	Ret	Ret	16	17		1	10th
2004	Minardi Cosworth	Cosworth V10	B	(Hungary) Zsolt Baumgartner	Ret	16	Ret	15	Ret	9	15	10	8	Ret	Ret	16	15	Ret	15	16	Ret	16		1	10th
2005	Minardi F1 Team	Cosworth V10	B		AUS	MAL	BHR	SMR	ESP	MON	EUR	CAN	USA	FRA	GBR	GER	HUN	TUR	ITA	BEL	BRA	JPN	CHN	7*	10th
2005	Minardi F1 Team	Cosworth V10	B	(Austria) Patrick Friesacher	17	Ret	12																	7*	10th
2005	Minardi F1 Team	Cosworth V10	B	(Netherlands) Christijan Albers	Ret	13	13																	7*	10th

* All points scored with the PS05.
