= Patrick Friesacher =

Austrian racing driver (born 1980)

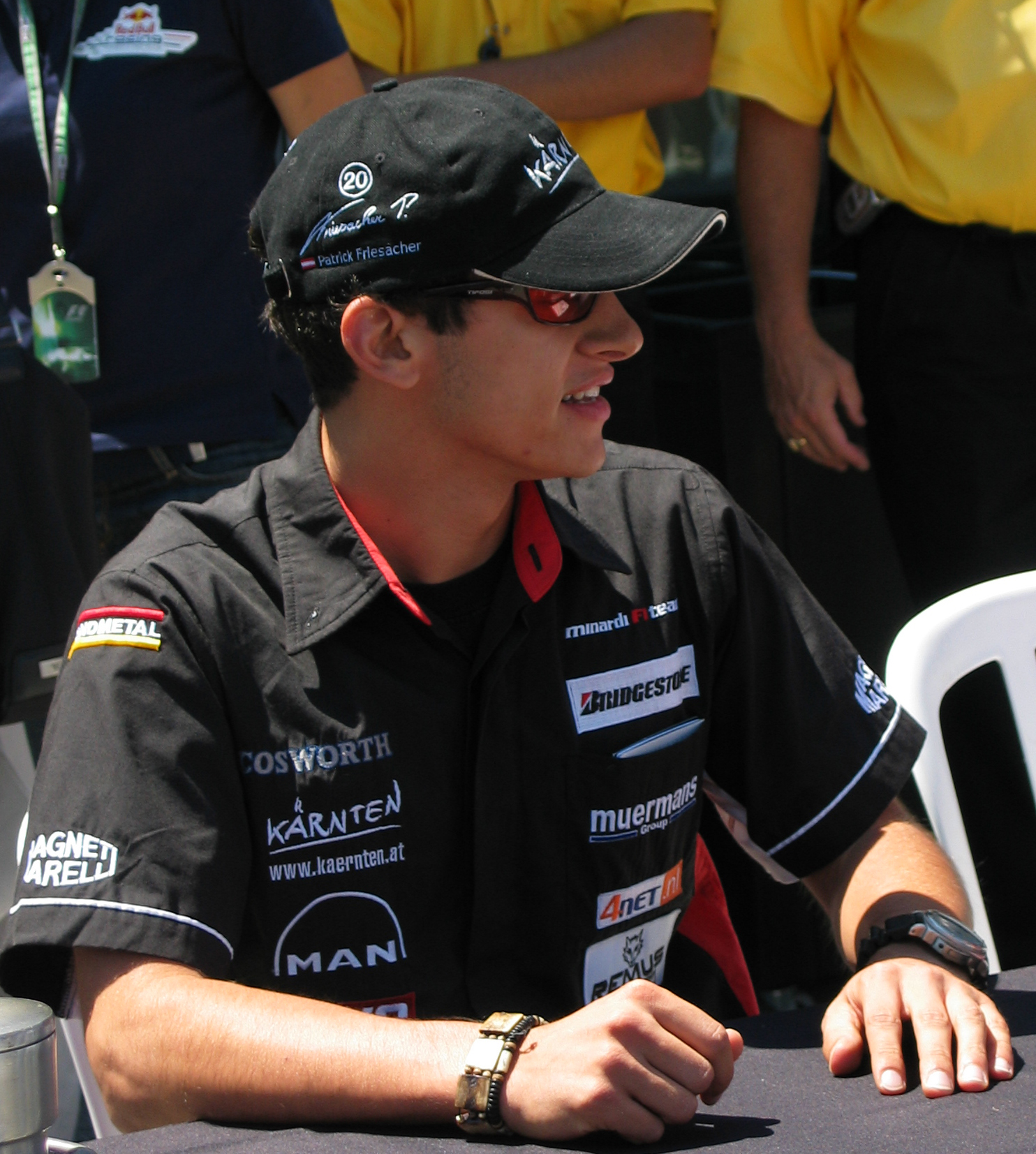
- Friesacher at the 2005 United States Grand Prix
- Born: 26 September 1980 (age 46); Wolfsberg, Carinthia, Austria

Formula One World Championship career
- Nationality: (Austria) Austrian
- Active years: 2005
- Team: Minardi
- Entries: 11
- Championships: 0
- Wins: 0
- Podiums: 0
- Career points: 3
- Pole positions: 0
- Fastest laps: 0
- First entry: 2005 Australian Grand Prix
- Last entry: 2005 British Grand Prix

Patrick Friesacher (born 26 September 1980) is an Austrian racing driver. He is the longest-serving Red Bull driver, and also drove for the Minardi Formula One team during the first half of the 2005 season.

After his departure from Formula One, Friesacher became an exhibition driver for Red Bull Racing and an instructor at the Red Bull Ring. Between 2017 and 2018, he was one of the drivers of the two-seater F1 Experiences cars.

== Early career ==
Friesacher started out racing motocross at the age of 5, but switched to kart racing in 1990, after watching a race at the A1-Ring. He became the first Red Bull junior driver in 1994. In 1995, Friesacher raced in the Torneo delle Industrie, finishing in the 11th position.

Friesacher suffered a crash at Schwarzlhalle in 1997 resulted in severe leg injuries that left him in the hospital for six weeks and in a wheelchair for seven weeks, meaning he had to learn how to walk again.

The next year, Friesacher moved to the French Formula Campus series, finishing third in the season. In 1999, Friesacher advanced to the French Formula 3 'B' class, coming third. He moved to the German Formula 3 series in 2000, securing two wins at Sachsenring and Oschersleben to finish sixth in the standings.

In 2001, Friesacher jumped to Formula 3000, where he scored three top-six finishes for the Red Bull Junior team, finishing 13th. He stayed with Red Bull for the 2002 season, achieving his maiden podium at Monaco and improving his Drivers' Championship record to tenth place.

He finished fifth in 2003 season, winning the Hungarian round after recovering from a broken arm sustained during a race earlier in the year. For the 2004 season, he joined the Super Nova squad. After a bad start to his fourth Formula 3000 season, Friesacher switched to Coloni after four races. He again finished fifth in the standings, with another race win at the Hungaroring.

At the end of 2004, Friesacher was dropped from the Red Bull Junior Team, after refusing to move to Formula Nippon.

== Formula One ==
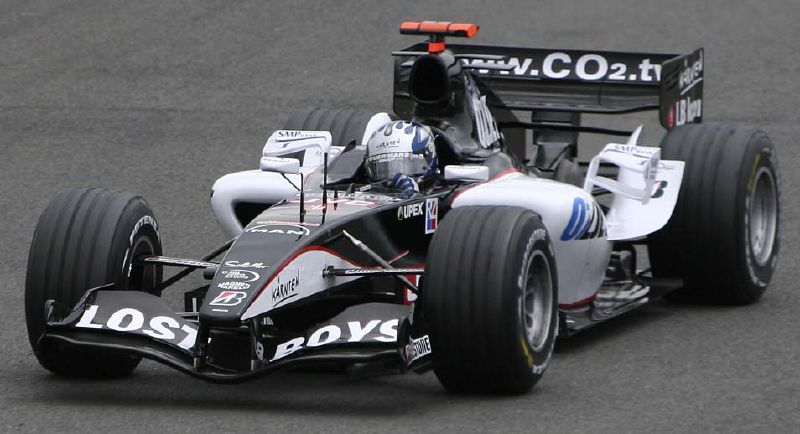
Friesacher at the 2005 British Grand Prix.

His Formula 3000 win in Hungary impressed Minardi principal Paul Stoddart, who promised Friesacher a test with the Faenza team. The Austrian driver also had talks with Jordan for a test in Jerez.

On 22 November 2004, Friesacher drove his first Formula One test for Minardi, running 41 laps at the Misano circuit in Italy. He was the fastest driver of the day, going over two seconds faster than second-placed Tiago Monteiro. He also drove one of the team's two-seaters three days later.

Friesacher's test performance convinced Stoddart to sign him, but the financial backing brought by the Austrian didn't seem to be enough for a seat. He then signed to become the team's third driver for the 2005 season, as Nicolas Kiesa was slated to race alongside Christijan Albers. However, Kiesa failed to raise the required sponsorship, and on 14 February 2005, Friesacher was announced as the titular driver.

On 19 February 2005, Friesacher drove his first test session as Minardi's titular driver at Imola. He completed 59 laps and was faster than his teammate Albers by 0.1 second. Due to a legal battle between Stoddart and the FIA regarding the use of the PS04B with 2004 specs, the team missed the Friday free practice sessions for the Australian Grand Prix. Friesacher then drove a total 18 laps in the two Saturday Free Practice sessions, spinning off the wet track and with his best lap time being 4 seconds slower than his teammate. Unpredictable weather and track conditions meant some drivers couldn't set competitive times during both qualifying sessions. Friesacher started the race in 16th place, last among the drivers who set times at both sessions, but ahead of his teammate nonetheless.

Friesacher was down to 19th after the start, with only Albers behind. By lap 14, Friesacher was already one lap behind the frontrunners. While being lapped by Coulthard, he made contact with the Red Bull and lost a piece of his car. He pitted following the incident, falling to last place. He remained at the back of the pack for the remainder of the race, finishing 17th following retirements, four laps behind winner Fisichella. Frisacher said he was happy to be able to finish the race. ITV's Martin Brundle noted during his debut race that he felt Friesacher had never looked like a potential F1 driver.

In Malaysia, Friesacher started at the back of the grid. He had a good start, overtaking Albers by lap 2, but spun off on oil left on track and was unable to continue. The following race at Sakhir, Friesacher started behind Albers but finished in front of him as the Dutchman had to pit on the first lap to repair his nose. With the new PS05 at Imola, Friesacher retired after only eight laps due to a broken clutch shaft. Another retirement came in the following race in Spain, when he spun into a gravel trap on lap 13.

At the Monaco Grand Prix, Friesacher had his highest Formula One grid position at 13th place, setting faster times than Albers and both Jordan drivers in qualifying, He was running in front of the other backmarkers on Sunday, but on lap 29 he lost control of the car and crashed at Nouvelle Chicane, effectively ending his race.

Friesacher outqualified his teammate again at the European Grand Prix, also starting in front of Jordan's Karthikeyan. His race pace was lacking however, and he finished last, one lap behind Albers and three behind the leaders. He was behind Albers when he retired again in Canada due to a power steering failure.

At the infamous United States Grand Prix, Friesacher picked up his only three Formula One Championship points after coming sixth out of the six Bridgestone-equipped drivers who competed. He started the race at the back of the grid and did not pose a threat to his teammate, In France, an 18th place start came to nothing as a puncture took him out of the race.

The British Grand Prix turned out to be Friesacher's final career Formula One race. He finished last, one lap behind his teammate and four laps behind the race winner Montoya. Due to a lack of payment from his sponsors, Friesacher was replaced in the lineup by Robert Doornbos, who completed the rest of the season for Minardi. According to his then agent Thomas Frank, Friesacher declined an offer from Coloni to race in the 2005 GP2 season.

=== Sponsorship controversy ===
Friesacher's Minardi seat was primarily backed by unnamed sponsors, mediated by Carinthia governor Jörg Haider, who agreed to pay US$2 million to Minardi. In return, the state's tourism board also featured its logos on the car. Days before the start of the season, however, the sponsorship money was not raised, putting Frisacher's seat in jeopardy. An unsecured loan of US$500,000 by the state-owned Hypo Alpe Adria helped secure his seat for the Australian Grand Prix.

On 19 July 2005, it was announced that Friesacher had been dropped from the Minardi team due to the failure of his personal sponsors to pay Minardi the amounts agreed at the start of the season.

In 2013, during the trial of Haider's former personal assistant Franz Koloini, it was revealed that the Hypo transfer of US$500,000 was made from an account in the name of Friesacher, without his signature and acknowledgement. That money was allegedly part of a US$1 million and €900,000 bribe from Russian businessmen to Haider, in order to obtain Austrian citizenship.

== A1GP commitments ==
In 2006, Friesacher joined the A1 Grand Prix of nations racing for his home country, Austria for the Mexican Grand Prix, clinching 18th in his first A1GP qualifying session. He then went on to finish tenth and ninth, scoring a total of three points for the team. He has also been a test driver of the new A1 GP chassis scheduled for introduction in the 2008–09 season. During a test session at the Magny-Cours circuit in August 2008, a suspension failure caused the car to crash. Friesacher sustained three crushed vertebrae in the accident.

== Re-emergence in ALMS ==
In early 2008, American Le Mans Series team Risi Competizione announced that Friesacher had been hired to co-drive the team's second Ferrari F430 racing car. Partnered with the young Harrison Brix, Friesacher made his series debut at the Acura Sports Car Challenge of St. Petersburg, a sprint event held on a street-course in Saint Petersburg, Florida. He missed part of the season due to his back injury sustained in A1 GP testing.

== Personal life ==
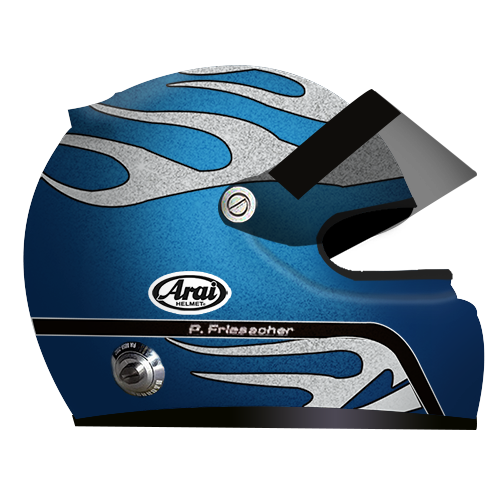
Friesacher's helmet design

Friesacher was born to Doris and Johann Friesacher. He has a sister named Nicole and a younger brother named Kevin, who is also a race driver. Friesacher had Ayrton Senna as his role model growing up, his favorite bands are Green Day and Blink-182. He is a La Filière alumni.

Friesacher drove one of Minardi's two-seater cars in the Thunder at the Rock event at Rockingham, on 30 August 2003. He finished third in the ten-lap-race, with footballer Teddy Sheringham riding alongside him. He would again drive a two-seater one month later at Kyalami, finishing third with Robby Wray as his passenger.

=== Helmet design and sponsors ===
Friesacher's helmet design is blue with silver flames painted from the visor. Upon his return to Red Bull, his helmet design changed to dark blue with the company's logo. He also ran a Red Bull-themed helmet while a member of their Junior Team. His helmet is manufactured by Arai.

Austrian exhaust manufacturer Remus has backed Friesacher's career since 1998.

== Racing record ==
=== Career summary ===
Season	Series	Team	Races	Wins	Poles	F.Laps	Podiums	Points	Position
1998	Formula Renault Campus	La Filière	?	?	?	?	?	?	**3rd**
1999	French Formula Three Championship - Class B	La Filière	11	?	?	?	?	?	**3rd**
2000	German Formula Three Championship	Opel Team BSR	20	2	3	2	4	126	6th
2001	FIA International Formula 3000	Red Bull Junior Team F3000	12	0	0	0	0	8	13th
2002	FIA International Formula 3000	Red Bull Junior Team F3000	12	0	0	0	1	14	10th
2003	FIA International Formula 3000	Red Bull Junior Team F3000	8	1	0	1	4	36	5th
2004	FIA International Formula 3000	Super Nova Racing	4	0	0	0	0	33	5th
2004	FIA International Formula 3000	Coloni Motorsport	6	1	0	0	2	33	5th
2005	Formula One	Minardi F1 Team	11	0	0	0	0	3	21st
2005-06	A1 Grand Prix	A1 Team Austria	2	0	0	0	0	3	19th
2007-08	A1 Grand Prix	A1 Team Austria	Test driver						
2008	American Le Mans Series	Risi Competizione	5	0	0	0	0	30	19th

=== Complete German Formula Three results ===
(key) (Races in bold indicate pole position) (Races in italics indicate fastest lap)

Year	Entrant	Engine	1	2	3	4	5	6	7	8	9	10	11	12	13	14	15	16	17	18	19	20	DC	Pts
2000	Opel Team BSR	Opel	ZOL; 1; 8	ZOL; 2 Ret	HOC; 1; 3	HOC; 2; 11	OSC; 1; 8	**OSC**; **2**; 18	NOR; 1 DNQ	NOR; 2 Ret	**SAC**; **1**; 1	**SAC**; **2**; 10	NÜR; 1; 8	NÜR; 2; 5	LAU; 1; 5	LAU; 2; 13	OSC; 1; 4	OSC; 2; 1	NÜR; 1; 5	NÜR; 2 DNS	HOC; 1; 6	HOC; 2; 2	6th	126

=== Complete International Formula 3000 results ===
(key) (Races in bold indicate pole position) (Races in italics indicate fastest lap)

Year	Entrant	1	2	3	4	5	6	7	8	9	10	11	12	DC	Points
2001	Red Bull Junior Team F3000	INT; Ret	IMO; 5	CAT; 8	A1R; Ret	MON; Ret	NUR; 10	MAG; 4	SIL; 19	HOC; 11	HUN; 4	SPA; 10	MNZ; Ret	13th	8
2002	Red Bull Junior Team	INT; 10	IMO; 5	CAT; 11	A1R; 5	MON; 2	NUR; 4	SIL; 7	MAG; 7	HOC; Ret	HUN; 6	SPA; 16	MNZ; Ret	10th	14
2003	Red Bull Junior Team F3000	IMO; 2	CAT; Ret	A1R	MON	NUR; Ret	MAG; 11	SIL; 5	HOC; 3	HUN; 1	MNZ; 2			5th	36
2004	Super Nova Racing	IMO; 9	CAT; 4	MON; 5	NUR; Ret									5th	33
2004	Coloni Motorsport					MAG; 3	SIL; 5	HOC; DNS	HUN; 1	SPA; 5	MNZ; Ret			5th	33

=== Complete Formula One results ===
(key)

Yr	Entrant	Chassis	Engine	1	2	3	4	5	6	7	8	9	10	11	12	13	14	15	16	17	18	19	WDC	Points
2005	Minardi Cosworth	Minardi PS04B	Cosworth V10	AUS; 17	MAL; Ret	BHR; 12																	21st	3
2005	Minardi Cosworth	Minardi PS05	Cosworth V10				SMR; Ret	ESP; Ret	MON; Ret	EUR; 18	CAN; Ret	USA; 6	FRA; Ret	GBR; 19	GER	HUN	TUR	ITA	BEL	BRA	JPN	CHN	21st	3

=== Complete A1 Grand Prix results ===
(key) (Races in bold indicate pole position) (Races in italics indicate fastest lap)

Year	Entrant	1	2	3	4	5	6	7	8	9	10	11	12	13	14	15	16	17	18	19	20	21	22	DC	Points
2005–06	Austria	GBR; SPR	GBR; FEA	GER; SPR	GER; FEA	POR; SPR	POR; FEA	AUS; SPR	AUS; FEA	MYS; SPR	MYS; FEA	UAE; SPR	UAE; FEA	RSA; SPR	RSA; FEA	IDN; SPR; 10	IDN; FEA; 9	MEX; SPR	MEX; FEA	USA; SPR	USA; FEA	CHN; SPR	CHN; FEA	19th	14
