= 2005 French Grand Prix =

Coordinates: 46°51′51″N 3°09′49″E

Race 10 of 19 in the 2005 Formula One World Championship
← Previous race	Next race →

Race details
- Date: 3 July 2005
- Official name: Formula 1 Grand Prix de France 2005
- Location: Circuit de Nevers Magny-Cours; Magny-Cours, France
- Course: Permanent racing facility
- Course length: 4.411 km (2.741 miles)
- Distance: 70 laps, 308.586 km (191.746 miles)
- Weather: Sunny, Air: 32 °C (90 °F), Track 53 °C (127 °F)

Pole position
Driver	(Spain) Fernando Alonso	Renault
- Time: 1:14.412

Fastest lap
Driver	(Finland) Kimi Räikkönen	McLaren-Mercedes
- Time: 1:16.423 on lap 25

Podium
First	(Spain) Fernando Alonso	Renault
Second	(Finland) Kimi Räikkönen	McLaren-Mercedes
Third	(Germany) Michael Schumacher	Ferrari

The 2005 French Grand Prix (officially the Formula 1 Grand Prix de France 2005) was a Formula One motor race held on 3 July 2005 at the Circuit de Nevers Magny-Cours near Magny-Cours in France. It was the tenth race of the 2005 FIA Formula One World Championship. The 70-lap race was won from pole position by Fernando Alonso, driving a Renault, with Drivers' Championship rival Kimi Räikkönen finishing second in a McLaren-Mercedes and Michael Schumacher third in a Ferrari.

== Report ==
=== Background ===
The French Grand Prix was the tenth race of the 2005 season and after the controversial United States Grand Prix at Indianapolis two weeks previously, Formula One returned to Europe for the busiest month in its 56-year history, with Magny-Cours being the first of four races to be held in the five weekends of July.

=== Practice ===
At the start of the weekend, McLaren and Renault appeared to be the fastest teams, topping the time sheets for both practice sessions on Friday. However, Kimi Räikkönen suffered an engine failure, using a new-spec Mercedes V10, and was forced to drop ten grid positions as a result. Renault set the two fastest times in Saturday practice 1 by over one second, but only nine cars ran in the session. Giancarlo Fisichella was quickest in the final practice session before qualifying, with Räikkönen was close behind.

=== Qualifying ===
The qualifying session ran in markedly cool conditions than expected but the Michelin tyres still had the advantage over the Bridgestones. Fernando Alonso scored his second consecutive pole position, with Toyota's Jarno Trulli alongside him on the front row. Räikkönen's penalty dropped him from third to 13th, thus promoting Michael Schumacher in the Ferrari to third. The Saubers of Felipe Massa and Jacques Villeneuve were 10th and 11th respectively (subsequently promoted to 9th and 10th), while Williams, who had struggled all weekend despite several new aerodynamic updates to the car, were 13th and 14th. The Jordans and Minardis filled the back two rows. The session was incredibly close as the top nine drivers were covered by less than a second.

=== Race ===
The start of the race saw Alonso speed away quickly, leaving Trulli to fend off Michael Schumacher through the first few corners, while Rubens Barrichello leap-frogged Takuma Sato into fourth place. Räikkönen was able to pass both Mark Webber and Ralf Schumacher to move into 11th position by the end of the first lap. By the second lap, Alonso had extended his lead to nearly three seconds, while Räikkönen moved up another position to tenth by passing Villeneuve. Red Bull's Christian Klien became the first retirement of the race on lap 2 due to a lack of fuel pressure. Alonso continued pulling away from the pack setting consecutive fastest laps.

Barrichello was the first of the front-runners to stop; from fourth position. The following lap both Trulli and Michael Schumacher pitted allowing Schumacher to emerge ahead having been stuck behind Trulli's Toyota since the beginning. Alonso finally pitted on lap 20 while leading by nearly 30 seconds allowing him to rejoin without losing a position. The pitstop sequence allowed the two long-running McLarens into 2nd and 3rd positions with Juan Pablo Montoya ahead of Räikkönen. Both McLaren drivers continued their first stints before Montoya pitted on lap 25 rejoining ahead of Michael Schumacher to take third. Räikkönen stayed out for three more laps and finally pitted on lap 28. Those laps did make the difference and he came out ahead of Montoya.

Patrick Friesacher became the second retirement when he stopped on lap 34. On lap 37, Christijan Albers crashed his Minardi heavily after spinning in turn 2. Alonso stopped for the second time on lap 41 rejoining with a 14-second margin to the second-placed Räikkönen. Meanwhile, Montoya began to struggle and ultimately retired from third position on lap 46 with a hydraulics failure. This allowed Michael Schumacher to move into the final podium position, which he held after his final pitstop on lap 51. Williams' dismal day continued as Nick Heidfeld pitted complaining that his car was impossible to drive. With all but the top four cars lapped, Sato ran wide briefly into the gravel at Estoril corner, which cost him 10th position to David Coulthard. Fisichella stalled as he attempted to leave his pit box on lap 58. Renault mechanics had to restart his engine costing him two valuable positions.

With eight laps remaining, Alonso lapped fourth-placed Jenson Button, leaving only the top three drivers on the lead lap. Alonso crossed the finish line to take his fifth and Renault's sixth win of the season. Räikkönen finished 11.8 seconds behind Alonso, ensuring that the gap in the championship standings increased by only two points, while Michael Schumacher picked up a timely podium for Ferrari, allowing him to stay in the championship hunt as well. Button came in fourth to score BAR's first points of the year, with Trulli, Fisichella, Ralf Schumacher and Villeneuve completing the top eight.

== Friday drivers ==
The bottom six teams in the 2004 Constructors' Championship were entitled to run a third car in free practice on Friday. These drivers drove on Friday but did not compete in qualifying or the race.

This was the last appearance for Olivier Panis.

Constructor	Nat	Driver
McLaren-Mercedes	(Spain)	Pedro de la Rosa
Sauber-Petronas		none
Red Bull-Cosworth	(Italy)	Vitantonio Liuzzi
Toyota	(France)	Olivier Panis
Jordan-Toyota	(Monaco)	Robert Doornbos
Minardi-Cosworth		none

== Classification ==
=== Qualifying ===
Pos	No	Driver	Constructor	Lap	Gap	Grid
1	5	(Spain) Fernando Alonso	Renault	1:14.412	—	1
2	16	(Italy) Jarno Trulli	Toyota	1:14.521	+0.109	2
3	9	(Finland) Kimi Räikkönen	McLaren-Mercedes	1:14.559	+0.147	13^{1}
4	1	(Germany) Michael Schumacher	Ferrari	1:14.572	+0.160	3
5	4	(Japan) Takuma Sato	BAR-Honda	1:14.655	+0.243	4
6	2	(Brazil) Rubens Barrichello	Ferrari	1:14.832	+0.420	5
7	6	(Italy) Giancarlo Fisichella	Renault	1:14.887	+0.475	6
8	3	(United Kingdom) Jenson Button	BAR-Honda	1:15.051	+0.639	7
9	10	(Colombia) Juan Pablo Montoya	McLaren-Mercedes	1:15.406	+0.994	8
10	12	(Brazil) Felipe Massa	Sauber-Petronas	1:15.566	+1.154	9
11	11	(Canada) Jacques Villeneuve	Sauber-Petronas	1:15.699	+1.287	10
12	17	(Germany) Ralf Schumacher	Toyota	1:15.771	+1.359	11
13	7	(Australia) Mark Webber	Williams-BMW	1:15.885	+1.473	12
14	8	(Germany) Nick Heidfeld	Williams-BMW	1:16.207	+1.795	14
15	14	(United Kingdom) David Coulthard	Red Bull-Cosworth	1:16.434	+2.022	15
16	15	(Austria) Christian Klien	Red Bull-Cosworth	1:16.547	+2.135	16
17	19	(India) Narain Karthikeyan	Jordan-Toyota	1:17.857	+3.445	17
18	20	(Austria) Patrick Friesacher	Minardi-Cosworth	1:17.960	+3.548	18
19	18	(Portugal) Tiago Monteiro	Jordan-Toyota	1:18.047	+3.635	19
20	21	(Netherlands) Christijan Albers	Minardi-Cosworth	1:18.335	+3.923	20

Notes

- ^1 – Kimi Räikkönen received a 10 position grid penalty for an engine change on Friday.

=== Race ===
Pos	No	Driver	Constructor	Tyre	Laps	Time/Retired	Grid	Points
1	5	(Spain) Fernando Alonso	Renault	MI	70	1:31:22.232	1	10
2	9	(Finland) Kimi Räikkönen	McLaren-Mercedes	MI	70	+ 11.805	13	8
3	1	(Germany) Michael Schumacher	Ferrari	B	70	+ 1:21.914	3	6
4	3	(United Kingdom) Jenson Button	BAR-Honda	MI	69	+ 1 lap	7	5
5	16	(Italy) Jarno Trulli	Toyota	MI	69	+ 1 lap	2	4
6	6	(Italy) Giancarlo Fisichella	Renault	MI	69	+ 1 lap	6	3
7	17	(Germany) Ralf Schumacher	Toyota	MI	69	+ 1 lap	11	2
8	11	(Canada) Jacques Villeneuve	Sauber-Petronas	MI	69	+ 1 lap	10	1
9	2	(Brazil) Rubens Barrichello	Ferrari	B	69	+ 1 lap	5	
10	14	(United Kingdom) David Coulthard	Red Bull-Cosworth	MI	69	+ 1 lap	15	
11	4	(Japan) Takuma Sato	BAR-Honda	MI	69	+ 1 lap	4	
12	7	(Australia) Mark Webber	Williams-BMW	MI	68	+ 2 laps	12	
13	18	(Portugal) Tiago Monteiro	Jordan-Toyota	B	67	+ 3 laps	19	
14	8	(Germany) Nick Heidfeld	Williams-BMW	MI	66	+ 4 laps	14	
15	19	(India) Narain Karthikeyan	Jordan-Toyota	B	66	+ 4 laps	17	
Ret	10	(Colombia) Juan Pablo Montoya	McLaren-Mercedes	MI	46	Engine	8	
Ret	21	(Netherlands) Christijan Albers	Minardi-Cosworth	B	37	Puncture	20	
Ret	20	(Austria) Patrick Friesacher	Minardi-Cosworth	B	33	Puncture	18	
Ret	12	(Brazil) Felipe Massa	Sauber-Petronas	MI	30	Hydraulics	9	
Ret	15	(Austria) Christian Klien	Red Bull-Cosworth	MI	1	Fuel pressure	16	

== Championship standings after the race ==
Drivers' Championship standings

	Pos	Driver	Points
	1	(Spain) Fernando Alonso	69
	2	(Finland) Kimi Räikkönen	45
	3	(Germany) Michael Schumacher	40
1	4	(Italy) Jarno Trulli	31
1	5	(Brazil) Rubens Barrichello	29

Constructors' Championship standings

	Pos	Constructor	Points
	1	(France) Renault	89
	2	(United Kingdom) McLaren-Mercedes	71
	3	(Italy) Ferrari	69
1	4	(Japan) Toyota	53
1	5	(United Kingdom) Williams-BMW	47

- Note: Only the top five positions are included for both sets of standings.

== See also ==
- 2005 Magny-Cours GP2 Series round
- 2005 Magny-Cours Porsche Supercup round

Previous race: 2005 United States Grand Prix	FIA Formula One World Championship; 2005 season	Next race: 2005 British Grand Prix
Previous race: 2004 French Grand Prix	French Grand Prix	Next race: 2006 French Grand Prix
