= 2005 Malaysian Grand Prix =

Coordinates: 2°45′39″N 101°44′18″E

Race 2 of 19 in the 2005 Formula One World Championship
← Previous race	Next race →

Race details
- Date: 20 March 2005
- Official name: 2005 Formula 1 Petronas Malaysian Grand Prix
- Location: Sepang International Circuit; Sepang, Selangor, Malaysia
- Course: Permanent racing facility
- Course length: 5.543 km (3.444 miles)
- Distance: 56 laps, 310.408 km (192.879 miles)
- Weather: Fine, Air: 34–36 °C (93–97 °F) and Track: 44–50 °C (111–122 °F)
- Attendance: 106,422 (Weekend)

Pole position
Driver	(Spain) Fernando Alonso	Renault
- Time: 3:07.672 (aggregate)

Fastest lap
Driver	(Finland) Kimi Räikkönen	McLaren-Mercedes
- Time: 1:35.483 on lap 23

Podium
First	(Spain) Fernando Alonso	Renault
Second	(Italy) Jarno Trulli	Toyota
Third	(Germany) Nick Heidfeld	Williams-BMW

The 2005 Malaysian Grand Prix (officially the 2005 Formula 1 Petronas Malaysian Grand Prix) was a Formula One race held at Sepang on 20 March 2005.

== Report ==
=== Background ===
After the Australian Grand Prix, Giancarlo Fisichella led the Drivers' Championship by two points ahead of Rubens Barrichello and four points ahead of Fernando Alonso. In the Constructors' Championship, Renault led Ferrari by eight points and Red Bull by nine points.

At BAR, after free practice on Friday, Takuma Sato was struck by a fever, following which the doctors advised him against taking part in the race. Therefore, from free practice on Saturday onwards, the second car was entrusted to third driver Anthony Davidson. For Davidson, the race was his first Grand Prix start since the 2002 Belgian Grand Prix.

The race also marked Rubens Barrichello's 200th Grand Prix.

=== Race ===
At the start, Alonso and Jarno Trulli were able to maintain their respective positions on the starting grid, followed by Fisichella and Mark Webber. Further back, Nick Heidfeld overtook the two Red Bulls and was now behind Kimi Räikkönen.

At the start of the second lap, Jenson Button attacked Räikkönen on the start-finish straight and overtook him, but retired immediately afterwards due to engine failure. At the same time, Patrick Friesacher in the Minardi went off the track in the first corner and also retired. A similar fate befell the other Honda engine, Davidson's, which caused a small fire.

During the 23rd lap, Räikkönen, who was in sixth place at the time, suffered a puncture and had to give up all desire to win. Three laps later, Jacques Villeneuve went off the track in the first corner and was the fourth driver to retire. Six laps later, Ralf Schumacher and Webber collided on the main straight, but without causing too much damage to the cars. Nineteen laps from the end, in the final corner, Webber tried to overtake Fisichella on the outside for third place, but the two collided: the Italian ended up on top of the Australian and both had to retire. Heidfeld benefited from this and took third place.

The Alonso ultimately won the race ahead of the Trulli and Heidfeld. For Alonso it was the second victory and the first since the 2003 Hungarian Grand Prix. Alonso's win made him the first Spaniard ever to lead the Formula 1 World Championship. It was Heidfeld's second podium finish and first since the 2001 Brazilian Grand Prix.

The race also marked Toyota's first-ever podium in Formula One and first Asian-licensed constructor to score a podium since 1968 United States Grand Prix when John Surtees drove for Honda in the 3rd place.

This was the first race since the 2003 Hungarian Grand Prix where neither Ferrari driver finished on the podium.

David Coulthard's sixth place finish ensured he overtook Nigel Mansell as the UK's all time highest F1 points scorer, a record held by Lewis Hamilton as of 2025.

== Friday drivers ==
The bottom 6 teams in the 2004 Constructors' Championship were entitled to run a third car in free practice on Friday. These drivers drove on Friday but did not compete in qualifying or the race.

Constructor	No	Driver
McLaren-Mercedes	35	(Spain) Pedro de la Rosa
Sauber-Petronas		none
Red Bull-Cosworth	37	(Italy) Vitantonio Liuzzi
Toyota	38	(Brazil) Ricardo Zonta
Jordan-Toyota	39	(Monaco) Robert Doornbos
Minardi-Cosworth		none

== Classification ==
=== Qualifying ===
Pos	No	Driver	Constructor	Q1	Q2	Total	Gap	Grid
1	5	(Spain) Fernando Alonso	Renault	1:32.582	1:35.090	3:07.672		1
2	16	(Italy) Jarno Trulli	Toyota	1:32.672	1:35.253	3:07.925	+0.253	2
3	6	(Italy) Giancarlo Fisichella	Renault	1:32.765	1:35.683	3:08.448	+0.776	3
4	7	(Australia) Mark Webber	Williams-BMW	1:33.204	1:35.700	3:08.904	+1.232	4
5	17	(Germany) Ralf Schumacher	Toyota	1:33.106	1:35.901	3:09.007	+1.335	5
6	9	(Finland) Kimi Räikkönen	McLaren-Mercedes	1:32.839	1:36.644	3:09.483	+1.811	6
7	15	(Austria) Christian Klien	Red Bull-Cosworth	1:33.724	1:35.865	3:09.589	+1.917	7
8	14	(United Kingdom) David Coulthard	Red Bull-Cosworth	1:33.809	1:35.891	3:09.700	+2.028	8
9	3	(United Kingdom) Jenson Button	BAR-Honda	1:33.616	1:36.216	3:09.832	+2.160	9
10	8	(Germany) Nick Heidfeld	Williams-BMW	1:33.464	1:36.453	3:09.917	+2.245	10
11	10	(Colombia) Juan Pablo Montoya	McLaren-Mercedes	1:33.333	1:36.757	3:10.090	+2.418	11
12	2	(Brazil) Rubens Barrichello	Ferrari	1:34.162	1:37.340	3:11.502	+3.830	12
13	1	(Germany) Michael Schumacher	Ferrari	1:34.072	1:37.561	3:11.633	+3.961	13
14	12	(Brazil) Felipe Massa	Sauber-Petronas	1:34.151	1:37.733	3:11.884	+4.212	14
15	4	(United Kingdom) Anthony Davidson	BAR-Honda	1:34.866	1:37.024	3:11.890	+4.218	15
16	11	(Canada) Jacques Villeneuve	Sauber-Petronas	1:34.887	1:38.108	3:12.995	+5.323	16
17	19	(India) Narain Karthikeyan	Jordan-Toyota	1:37.806	1:39.850	3:17.656	+9.984	17
18	18	(Portugal) Tiago Monteiro	Jordan-Toyota	1:37.856	1:40.106	3:17.962	+10.290	18
19	20	(Austria) Patrick Friesacher	Minardi-Cosworth	1:39.268	1:41.918	3:21.186	+13.514	20^{1}
20	21	(Netherlands) Christijan Albers	Minardi-Cosworth	1:40.432	1:42.569	3:23.001	+15.329	19

Notes

- ^1 – Patrick Friesacher received a 10-place grid penalty for an engine change.

=== Race ===
Pos	No	Driver	Constructor	Tyre	Laps	Time/Retired	Grid	Points
1	5	(Spain) Fernando Alonso	Renault	M	56	1:31:33.736	1	10
2	16	(Italy) Jarno Trulli	Toyota	M	56	+24.327	2	8
3	8	(Germany) Nick Heidfeld	Williams-BMW	M	56	+32.188	10	6
4	10	(Colombia) Juan Pablo Montoya	McLaren-Mercedes	M	56	+41.631	11	5
5	17	(Germany) Ralf Schumacher	Toyota	M	56	+51.854	5	4
6	14	(United Kingdom) David Coulthard	Red Bull-Cosworth	M	56	+1:12.543	8	3
7	1	(Germany) Michael Schumacher	Ferrari	B	56	+1:19.988	13	2
8	15	(Austria) Christian Klien	Red Bull-Cosworth	M	56	+1:20.835	7	1
9	9	(Finland) Kimi Räikkönen	McLaren-Mercedes	M	56	+1:21.580	6	
10	12	(Brazil) Felipe Massa	Sauber-Petronas	M	55	+1 Lap	14	
11	19	(India) Narain Karthikeyan	Jordan-Toyota	B	54	+2 Laps	17	
12	18	(Portugal) Tiago Monteiro	Jordan-Toyota	B	53	+3 Laps	18	
13	21	(Netherlands) Christijan Albers	Minardi-Cosworth	B	52	+4 Laps	19	
Ret	2	(Brazil) Rubens Barrichello	Ferrari	B	49	Handling	12	
Ret	6	(Italy) Giancarlo Fisichella	Renault	M	36	Collision	3	
Ret	7	(Australia) Mark Webber	Williams-BMW	M	36	Collision	4	
Ret	11	(Canada) Jacques Villeneuve	Sauber-Petronas	M	26	Spun Off	16	
Ret	3	(United Kingdom) Jenson Button	BAR-Honda	M	2	Engine	9	
Ret	4	(United Kingdom) Anthony Davidson	BAR-Honda	M	2	Engine	15	
Ret	20	(Austria) Patrick Friesacher	Minardi-Cosworth	B	2	Spun Off	20	

== Championship standings after the race ==
Drivers' Championship standings

	Pos.	Driver	Points
2	1	(Spain) Fernando Alonso	16
1	2	(Italy) Giancarlo Fisichella	10
1	3	(Brazil) Rubens Barrichello	8
5	4	(Italy) Jarno Trulli	8
1	5	(United Kingdom) David Coulthard	8

Constructors' Championship standings

	Pos.	Constructor	Points
	1	(France) Renault	26
4	2	(Japan) Toyota	12
	3	(United Kingdom) Red Bull-Cosworth	11
2	4	(Italy) Ferrari	10
	5	(United Kingdom) Williams-BMW	10

- Note: Only the top five positions are included for both sets of standings.

Previous race: 2005 Australian Grand Prix	FIA Formula One World Championship; 2005 season	Next race: 2005 Bahrain Grand Prix
Previous race: 2004 Malaysian Grand Prix	Malaysian Grand Prix	Next race: 2006 Malaysian Grand Prix
