= 2005 Canadian Grand Prix =

Coordinates: 45°30′04″N 73°31′23″W

Race 8 of 19 in the 2005 Formula One World Championship
← Previous race	Next race →

Race details
- Date: June 12, 2005
- Official name: Formula 1 Grand Prix du Canada 2005
- Location: Circuit Gilles Villeneuve, Montreal, Quebec, Canada
- Course: Street circuit
- Course length: 4.361 km (2.710 miles)
- Distance: 70 laps, 305.270 km (189.686 miles)
- Weather: Cloudy and hot with temperatures approaching 32.5 °C (90.5 °F); Wind speeds up to 5.1 km/h (3.2 mph); Track 43–47 °C (109–117 °F)

Pole position
Driver	(United Kingdom) Jenson Button	BAR-Honda
- Time: 1:15.217

Fastest lap
Driver	(Finland) Kimi Räikkönen	McLaren-Mercedes
- Time: 1:14.384 on lap 23

Podium
First	(Finland) Kimi Räikkönen	McLaren-Mercedes
Second	(Germany) Michael Schumacher	Ferrari
Third	(Brazil) Rubens Barrichello	Ferrari

The 2005 Canadian Grand Prix (officially the Formula 1 Grand Prix du Canada 2005) was a Formula One motor race held on 12 June 2005 at the Circuit Gilles Villeneuve in Montreal, Quebec, Canada. The 70-lap race was the eighth round of the 2005 Formula One season, the 43rd running of the Canadian Grand Prix, and the 37th running as a round of the World Championship. It set a ratings record and was the most watched F1 race in history with 51 million viewers. It was also the first of two consecutive North American rounds.

The race was won by McLaren driver Kimi Räikkönen, taking his third win from four races. The two Ferrari cars completed the podium, with Michael Schumacher in second place and Rubens Barrichello in third. Both Renaults failed to finish the race, but the team maintained their lead in the Constructors' Championship; their driver, Fernando Alonso also kept his lead in the Drivers' Championship, despite the gap between himself and nearest rival Räikkönen closing by ten points.

== Report ==
=== Background ===
After the European Grand Prix, Fernando Alonso led the drivers' championship with 32 points ahead of Kimi Räikkönen and Jarno Trulli. In the constructors' championship, Renault led McLaren-Mercedes by 23 points and Toyota by 32 points.

Christian Klien returned to the Red Bull cockpit after being replaced by Vitantonio Liuzzi in the previous four races.

=== Friday drivers ===
The bottom 6 teams in the 2004 Constructors' Championship were entitled to run a third car in free practice on Friday. These drivers drove on Friday but did not compete in qualifying or the race.

Jordan was banned from running a third car at this race because Franck Montagny had used six sets of tyres instead of four at the previous race. Scott Speed made his debut in practice on Friday. He became the first American driver to compete in a Formula One event since Michael Andretti's 1993 Italian Grand Prix.

Constructor	Nat	Driver
McLaren-Mercedes	(Spain)	Pedro de la Rosa
Sauber-Petronas		-
Red Bull-Cosworth	(United States)	Scott Speed
Toyota	(Brazil)	Ricardo Zonta
Jordan-Toyota		-
Minardi-Cosworth		-

=== Qualifying ===
After retiring on the last lap of the European Grand Prix, Kimi Räikkönen was the 11th driver on the track in qualifying, and he managed to line up 7th on the grid. Ferrari's Rubens Barrichello suffered a gearbox failure before the start of his qualifying lap, and was forced to abort his run. Jenson Button managed to take pole position, with Michael Schumacher second, and both Renault drivers on the second row.

=== Race ===
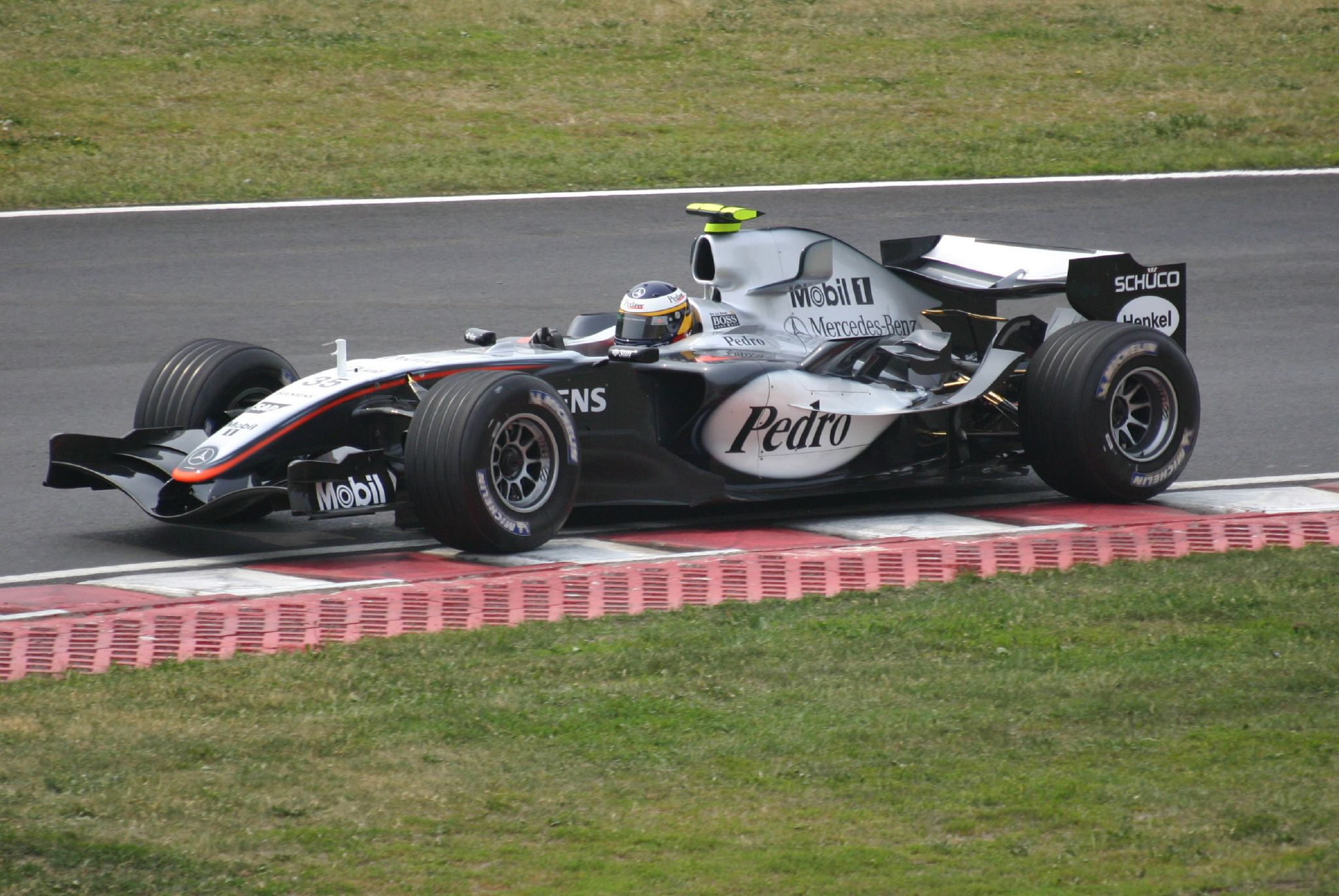
Pedro de la Rosa driving for McLaren during Friday practice as third driver.

Barrichello, who would have been last on the grid, decided to start the race from pitlane, putting extra fuel in his car. At race start, both Button and Schumacher got away slowly, and Giancarlo Fisichella and Fernando Alonso took off well to move into first and second by the first corner. The McLarens of Juan Pablo Montoya and Räikkönen were also able to pass Schumacher, moving into 4th and 5th behind Button. Further back in the field, BAR's Takuma Sato made a small mistake, but did not lose a large amount of time. On the second lap, Fisichella was able to widen the gap back to Alonso, while local driver Jacques Villeneuve was forced to pit for a new front wing, leaving him at the back of the field. As the race continued, the Renault's pulled further away from the pack, and Barrichello was constantly moving up the field, up to 15th position by the end of lap 8. Narain Karthikeyan had a spin after a mistake in turn 1, allowing Jordan teammate Tiago Monteiro past.

Michael Schumacher became the first driver to take his scheduled pitstop, refuelling on lap 12 to drop from 6th to 12th position. Three laps later, Button and Ralf Schumacher showed their hands, also entering the pits for more fuel. Button dropped from 3rd to 7th, leaving the two Renaults to lead from the two McLarens. On lap 21, the first of the two-stoppers pitted, with Felipe Massa, Nick Heidfeld and Klien all entering pitlane. The following lap, Sato entered his garage, apparently retiring from the race with gearbox trouble. Lap 24 saw the first of the leaders pit, with championship contenders Alonso and Räikkönen refuelling, before both of their teammates pitted on the following lap. On exiting the pits, Montoya went too fast on cold tyres, leaving the track and allowing Alonso to retain 2nd position. Karthikeyan hit the wall at the back end of the circuit, forcing him to retire from the race. Mark Webber, up to 7th position through a very long first stint, pitted on lap 28, and fed back into the race 9th, just ahead of Massa, Heidfeld and Ralf Schumacher. On the following lap, Webber went wide onto the grass, and in attempting to make up time, braked too late into the hairpin, running very wide and losing 3 positions. Barrichello became the final driver to pit on lap 31, dropping from 8th to 12th.

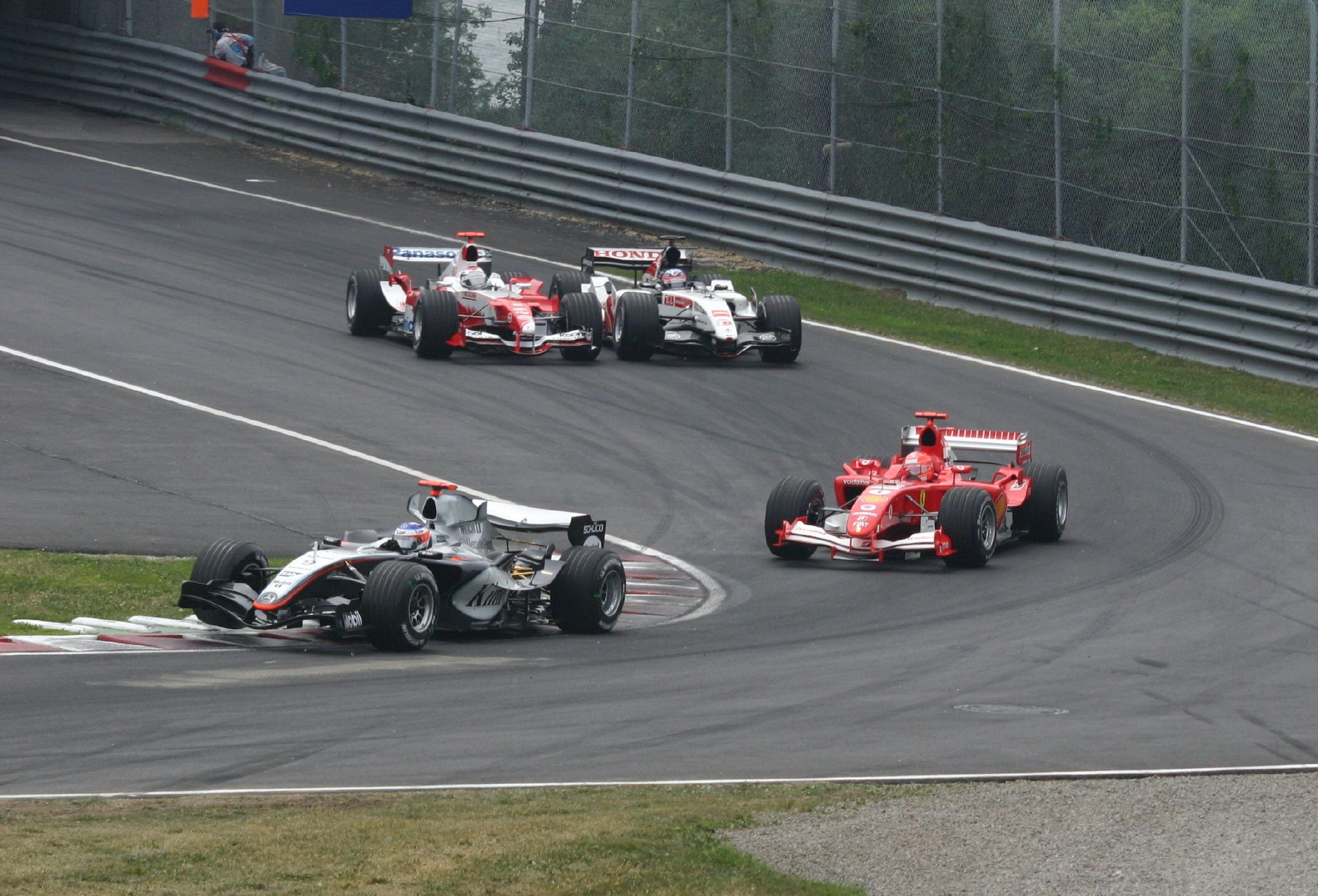
The battle for fifth place continues on lap 4 as Kimi Räikkönen leads Michael Schumacher, and just behind Jarno Trulli attempts a move on Takuma Sato for seventh.

After following close behind for several laps, and appearing to be quicker, Alonso passed teammate Fisichella for the lead on lap 33, but Fisichella obviously had a technical problem, as Montoya easily passed him on the same lap. Fisichella entered the pits to retire at the end of the lap, with hydraulic system problems. On lap 34, both Button and Michael Schumacher took their second stops, retaining 4th and 5th positions. On lap 35, Alonso led from Montoya, Räikkönen, Button, Schumacher and Jarno Trulli. However, on lap 39, Alonso ran wide at the exit of turn 4 and hit the outside wall, damaging his suspension and forcing him to retire from the race. This left Montoya in the lead, followed by Räikkönen. After following Massa for several laps, Heidfeld's BMW engine failed, allowing Ralf Schumacher into 7th and Webber to 8th. Takuma Sato rejoined the race 24 laps behind, after the B.A.R team fixed his car in order to gain him a slightly better starting position in qualifying for the following grand prix.

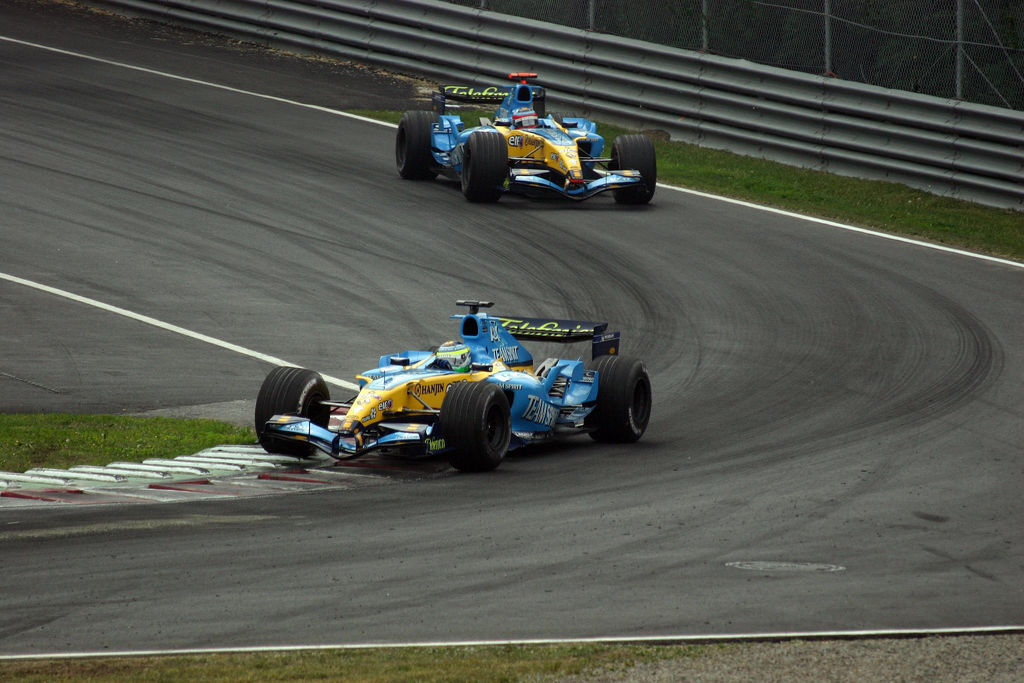
The two Renault drivers led the race in its early stages, with Giancarlo Fisichella ahead of Fernando Alonso. Both eventually failed to finish.

On lap 49, the gap from Montoya to Räikkönen was reduced to around 3 seconds. Button, under pressure from Michael Schumacher, made a mistake at the final chicane, hitting the inside kerb heavily, which forced him into the "wall of champions" on the outside. Button was forced to retire from the race, handing 3rd position to Schumacher, and causing the deployment of the safety car as Button's car was in a dangerous position. Every car took the opportunity to pit besides Montoya, who was forced to stay out an extra lap while Räikkönen was refuelled. On exiting the pits, Montoya re-entered the race under the safety car, which had just led the train of cars through turns 1 and 2. Montoya slipped into 2nd, slightly ahead of David Coulthard on track, although the Red Bull Racing driver had been lapped. Before the restart, Räikkönen led from Montoya, Michael Schumacher, Trulli, Webber, Massa, Barrichello and Ralf Schumacher. As the safety car re-entered the pits, Webber made a mistake into turn 1, allowing both Massa and Barrichello through, although the Sauber driver was forced wide and Barrichello moved into 5th. Soon after, it was announced that Montoya was under investigation by the stewards, and he was black-flagged (disqualified) from the race for exiting the pits while a red light was showing (as the safety car was on the pit straight), making it his 2nd consecutive disqualification in Canada.

As the race entered the closing stages, Michael Schumacher closed in on Räikkönen, who was troubled by a misaligned steering wheel. Trulli appeared to be having trouble with his brakes, and retired when they failed, leaving Barrichello in a comfortable 3rd position. However, Barrichello made a small error, allowing Massa to close up behind, but Webber was also close to Massa. Meanwhile, Takuma Sato appeared to have a mechanical failure which forced him to spin at the hairpin, before the rear of his car caught fire due to overheating. Räikkönen was able to retain his 1-second gap back to Schumacher to take the race win, with Barrichello more than 30 seconds behind in 3rd position. Webber was close to Massa into the final corner, but was unable to pass, leaving Massa to take a valuable 4th position and 5 championship points. Completing the pointscorers were Ralf Schumacher, Coulthard and Klien. The result meant Räikkönen reduced the gap in the championship standings to just 22 points, and the double-podium for Ferrari allowed them to close up in the constructors' championship.

== Classification ==
=== Qualifying ===
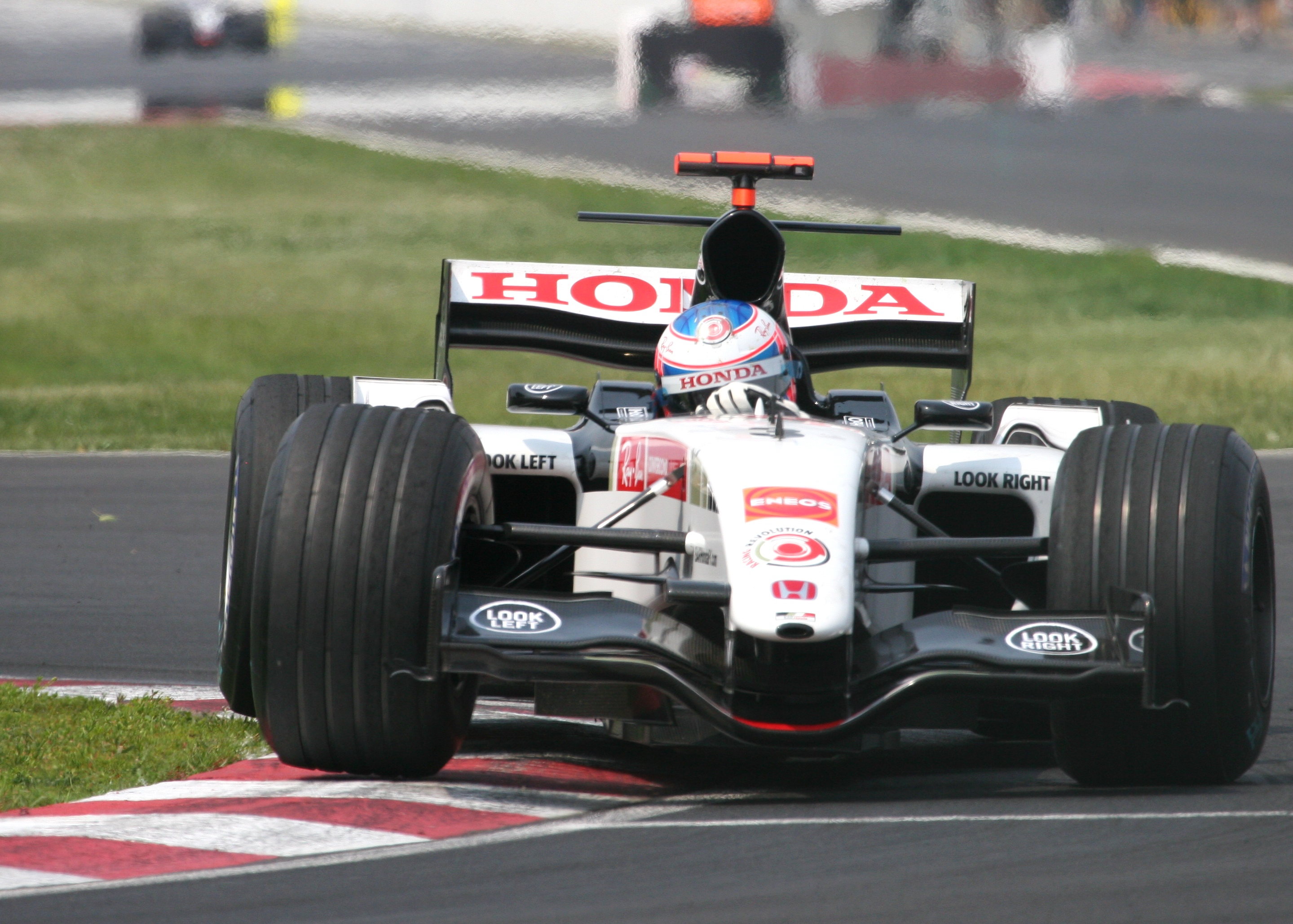
Jenson Button took pole position in qualifying for the BAR team.

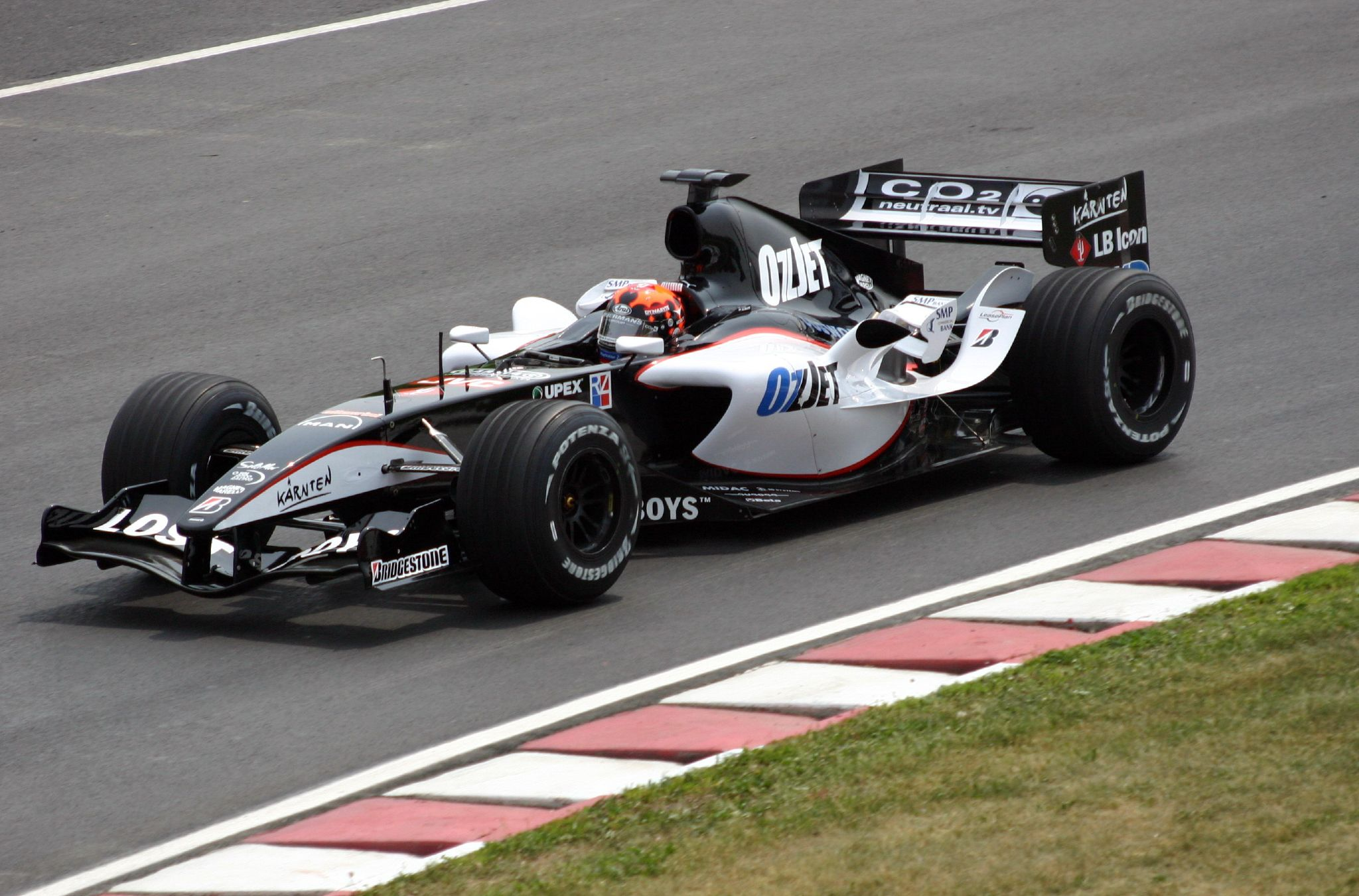
Christijan Albers qualified in fifteenth position.

Pos	No	Driver	Constructor	Lap	Gap	Grid
1	3	(United Kingdom) Jenson Button	BAR-Honda	1:15.217	—	1
2	1	(Germany) Michael Schumacher	Ferrari	1:15.475	+0.258	2
3	5	(Spain) Fernando Alonso	Renault	1:15.561	+0.344	3
4	6	(Italy) Giancarlo Fisichella	Renault	1:15.577	+0.360	4
5	10	(Colombia) Juan Pablo Montoya	McLaren-Mercedes	1:15.669	+0.452	5
6	4	(Japan) Takuma Sato	BAR-Honda	1:15.729	+0.512	6
7	9	(Finland) Kimi Räikkönen	McLaren-Mercedes	1:15.923	+0.706	7
8	11	(Canada) Jacques Villeneuve	Sauber-Petronas	1:16.116	+0.899	8
9	16	(Italy) Jarno Trulli	Toyota	1:16.201	+0.984	9
10	17	(Germany) Ralf Schumacher	Toyota	1:16.362	+1.145	10
11	12	(Brazil) Felipe Massa	Sauber-Petronas	1:16.661	+1.444	11
12	14	(United Kingdom) David Coulthard	Red Bull-Cosworth	1:16.890	+1.673	12
13	8	(Germany) Nick Heidfeld	Williams-BMW	1:17.081	+1.864	13
14	7	(Australia) Mark Webber	Williams-BMW	1:17.749	+2.532	14
15	21	(Netherlands) Christijan Albers	Minardi-Cosworth	1:18.214	+2.997	15
16	15	(Austria) Christian Klien	Red Bull-Cosworth	1:18.249	+3.032	16
17	19	(India) Narain Karthikeyan	Jordan-Toyota	1:18.664	+3.447	17
18	18	(Portugal) Tiago Monteiro	Jordan-Toyota	1:19.034	+3.817	18
19	20	(Austria) Patrick Friesacher	Minardi-Cosworth	1:19.574	+4.357	19
20	2	(Brazil) Rubens Barrichello	Ferrari	No time^{1}		20

Notes

- ^1 – Rubens Barrichello didn't set a time due to gearbox problems.

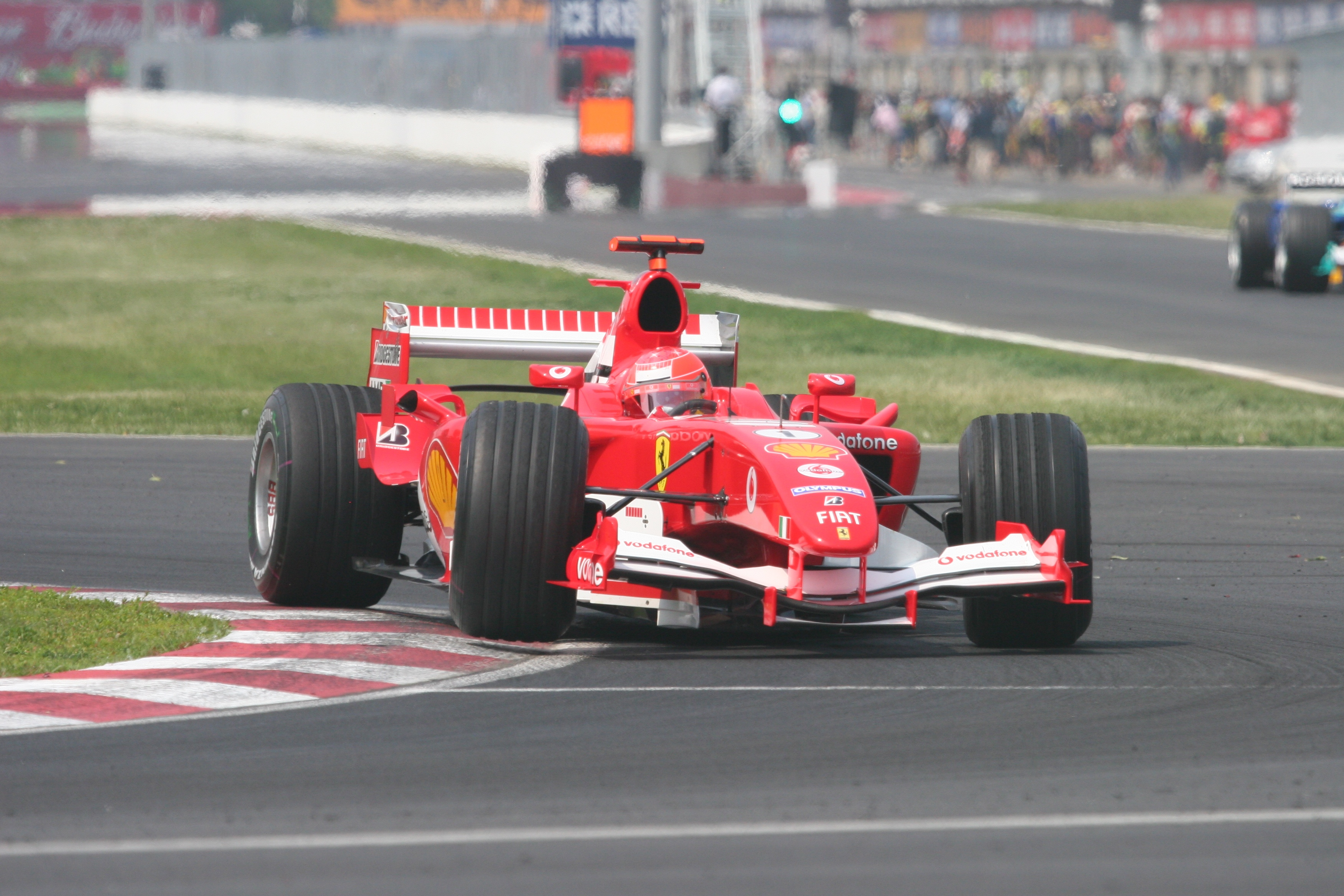
Michael Schumacher scored a second-place finish for Ferrari.

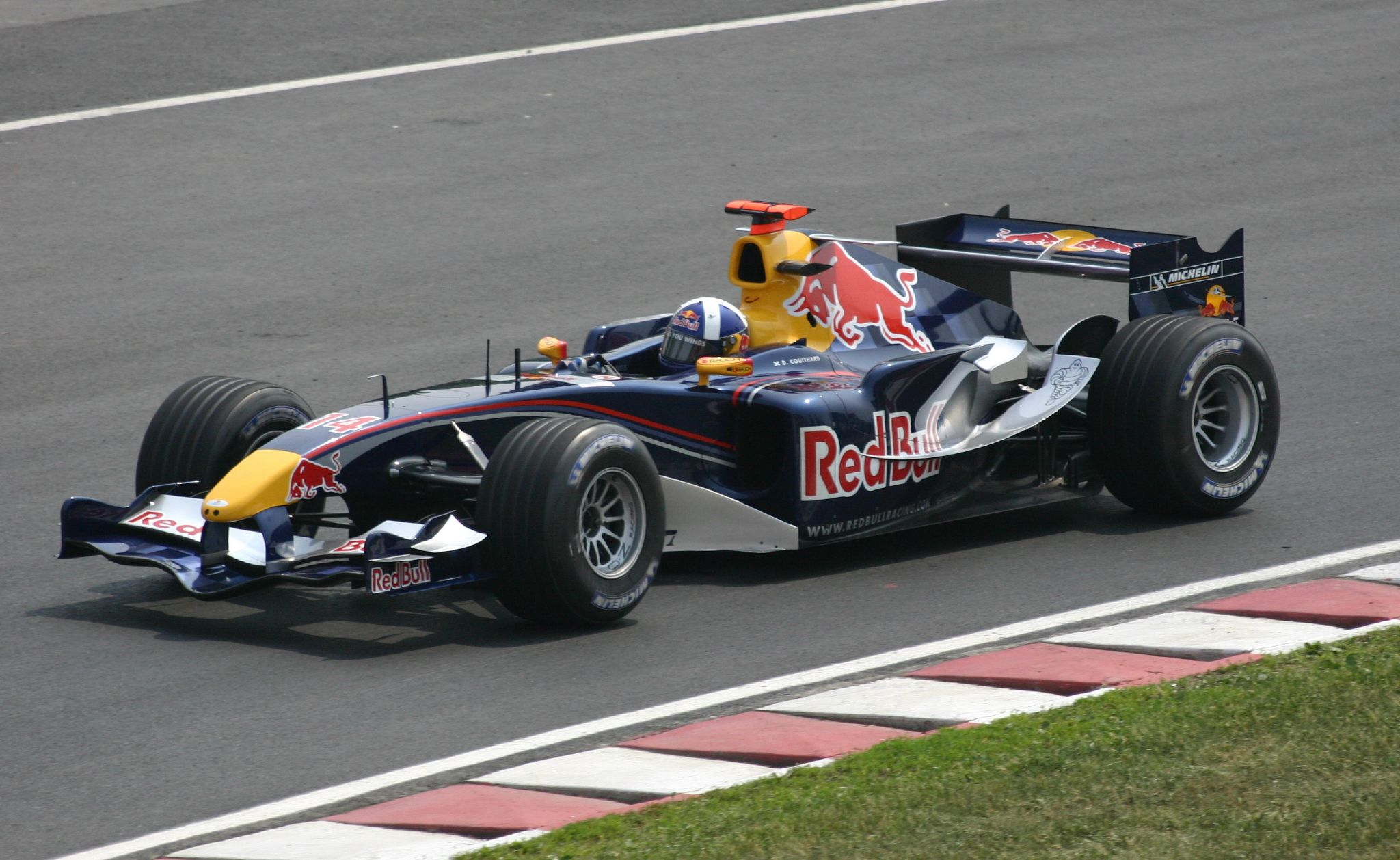
Coulthard driving to an impressive seventh position.

=== Race ===
Pos	No	Driver	Constructor	Tyre	Laps	Time/Retired	Grid	Points
1	9	(Finland) Kimi Räikkönen	McLaren-Mercedes	MI	70	1:32:09.290	7	10
2	1	(Germany) Michael Schumacher	Ferrari	B	70	+1.137	2	8
3	2	(Brazil) Rubens Barrichello	Ferrari	B	70	+40.483	PL^{2}	6
4	12	(Brazil) Felipe Massa	Sauber-Petronas	MI	70	+55.139	11	5
5	7	(Australia) Mark Webber	Williams-BMW	MI	70	+55.779	14	4
6	17	(Germany) Ralf Schumacher	Toyota	MI	69	+1 Lap	10	3
7	14	(United Kingdom) David Coulthard	Red Bull-Cosworth	MI	69	+1 Lap	12	2
8	15	(Austria) Christian Klien	Red Bull-Cosworth	MI	69	+1 Lap	16	1
9	11	(Canada) Jacques Villeneuve	Sauber-Petronas	MI	69	+1 Lap	8	
10	18	(Portugal) Tiago Monteiro	Jordan-Toyota	B	67	+3 Laps	18	
11	21	(Netherlands) Christijan Albers	Minardi-Cosworth	B	67	+3 Laps	15	
Ret	16	(Italy) Jarno Trulli	Toyota	MI	62	Brakes	9	
Ret	3	(United Kingdom) Jenson Button	BAR-Honda	MI	46	Accident	1	
Ret	8	(Germany) Nick Heidfeld	Williams-BMW	MI	43	Engine	13	
Ret	4	(Japan) Takuma Sato	BAR-Honda	MI	40	Brakes	6	
Ret	20	(Austria) Patrick Friesacher	Minardi-Cosworth	B	39	Hydraulics	19	
Ret	5	(Spain) Fernando Alonso	Renault	MI	38	Collision/Suspension	3	
Ret	6	(Italy) Giancarlo Fisichella	Renault	MI	32	Hydraulic pressure	4	
Ret	19	(India) Narain Karthikeyan	Jordan-Toyota	B	24	Suspension	17	
DSQ	10	(Colombia) Juan Pablo Montoya	McLaren-Mercedes	MI	52	Exited pit lane under red light^{3}	5	

Notes

- ^2 – Rubens Barrichello started the race from the pitlane.
- ^3 – Juan Pablo Montoya was disqualified from the race for leaving the pitlane whilst it was closed by means of a red light at pit exit.

== Championship standings after the race ==
Drivers' Championship standings

	Pos	Driver	Points
	1	(Spain) Fernando Alonso	59
	2	(Finland) Kimi Räikkönen	37
	3	(Italy) Jarno Trulli	27
	4	(Germany) Nick Heidfeld	25
3	5	(Germany) Michael Schumacher	24

Constructors' Championship standings

	Pos	Constructor	Points
	1	(France) Renault	76
	2	(United Kingdom) McLaren-Mercedes	63
1	3	(United Kingdom) Williams-BMW	47
1	4	(Japan) Toyota	47
	5	(Italy) Ferrari	45

- Note: Only the top five positions are included for both sets of standings.

Previous race: 2005 European Grand Prix	FIA Formula One World Championship; 2005 season	Next race: 2005 United States Grand Prix
Previous race: 2004 Canadian Grand Prix	Canadian Grand Prix	Next race: 2006 Canadian Grand Prix
