= 2005 United States Grand Prix =

Formula One motor race

Race 9 of 19 in the 2005 Formula One World Championship
← Previous race	Next race →

Race details
- Date: June 19, 2005
- Official name: 2005 Formula 1 United States Grand Prix
- Location: Indianapolis Motor Speedway, Speedway, Indiana
- Course: Permanent racing facility
- Course length: 4.192 km (2.605 miles)
- Distance: 73 laps, 306.016 km (190.238 miles)
- Weather: Cloudy, temperatures up to 25 °C (77 °F); wind speeds up to 17.9 km/h (11.1 mph)

Pole position
Driver	(Italy) Jarno Trulli (Note: Trulli did not start the race due to withdrawing with the other Michelin runners. His grid slot was left vacant.)	Toyota
- Time: 1:10.625

Fastest lap
Driver	(Germany) Michael Schumacher	Ferrari
- Time: 1:11.497 on lap 48

Podium
First	(Germany) Michael Schumacher	Ferrari
Second	(Brazil) Rubens Barrichello	Ferrari
Third	(Portugal) Tiago Monteiro	Jordan-Toyota

The 2005 United States Grand Prix (officially the 2005 Formula 1 United States Grand Prix) was a Formula One motor race held on June 19, 2005, at the Indianapolis Motor Speedway and was the ninth race of the 2005 Formula One World Championship. The event is one of the most infamous races in motorsport history. Out of the 20 cars that entered the race, only the six cars from the teams using Bridgestone tyres (Ferrari, Jordan, and Minardi) competed. The remaining fourteen entrants, all using Michelin tyres, completed the formation lap, but retired to the pit lane before the race started.

Following two tyre failures before the race, which caused major accidents for Ralf Schumacher's Toyota during Friday practice and then for his Toyota stand-in Ricardo Zonta, Michelin advised its seven customer teams that without a reduction in speed in Turn 13, the tyres provided for the race would only be safe for 10 laps. Michelin had been providing working tyres for the race since 2001. The situation was worsened by the 2005 Formula One rules, which forbade tyre changes during the race, and a repave of the oval portion of the course after the 2004 Brickyard 400.

The Fédération Internationale de l'Automobile (FIA), the sport's governing body, refused a compromise proposal from Michelin to allow a chicane to be installed, maintaining that such rule changes would be grossly unfair to the Bridgestone-shod teams, who had come prepared with properly working tyres, and that a last-minute change to the track layout would be dangerous in case of crashes. The Michelin teams, unable to come to a compromise with the FIA, decided not to participate. It was later stated that the Michelin-shod teams could have potentially exposed themselves to criminal liability under Indiana state law had they competed. It was also thought that since Bridgestone also provided tyres to the two Indy Racing League series (IndyCar Series and Infiniti Pro Series) via its Firestone brand, and had encountered issues during testing that caused them to return with different IndyCar tyres, it understood better the loads the Formula One tyres would be under. Thus, Bridgestone was able to provide a safe tyre.

Of the six competitors, Ferrari's Michael Schumacher was the eventual winner, with his teammate Rubens Barrichello finishing second and Jordan driver Tiago Monteiro finishing third, which would be his only podium in Formula One as well as the last podium for Jordan. The result moved Schumacher to third in the World Drivers' Championship—no driver above him took part in the race. The final race result was the lowest number of finishing entries ever seen in a major open-wheel motorsports event at the Indianapolis Motor Speedway since the institution of the 500-Mile Race (surpassing the previous record low of seven finishers in 1966, a race marred by a major first lap accident that eliminated a full third of the starting field). The situation created enormous negative publicity for the sport of Formula One, especially in the United States, a market in which Formula One had struggled to establish itself over the preceding twenty years.

== Background ==
The race was the 9th of the 19 rounds in the 2005 Formula One World Championship, and the sixth to be held at the 4.192 km (2.605 mi) 13-turn Indianapolis Motor Speedway infield road course, located in Speedway, Indiana. It took place on June 19, 2005, and was formally called the XXXIV Foster's United States Grand Prix. Before the event, Renault driver Fernando Alonso led the World Drivers' Championship with 59 points, ahead of McLaren's Kimi Räikkönen with 37 points and Toyota's Jarno Trulli with 27 points. Williams driver Nick Heidfeld was fourth with 25 points and Ferrari's Michael Schumacher was fifth with 24 points. Renault with 76 points led McLaren in second on 63 points at the top of the World Constructors' Championships. Williams and Toyota were tied for third with 47 points each and Ferrari were fifth with 45 points.

== Qualifying ==
The qualifying session for the United States Grand Prix was held on June 18. During the session, each competitor recorded one timed lap with the running sequence set by the results of the previous Grand Prix reversed. All non-classified drivers were sorted according to how many laps they completed, with the one with the highest number going out last. Trulli achieved pole position by posting the fastest lap time, 1 minute, 10.625 seconds. Trulli, driving for Toyota, was the team's first driver to claim a pole position for a Formula One race. The second-place qualifier was Räikkönen, followed by Jenson Button, Giancarlo Fisichella, and Michael Schumacher. Alonso qualified in sixth, while the rest of the top ten consisted of Rubens Barrichello, Takuma Sato, Mark Webber, and Felipe Massa.

=== Qualifying classification ===
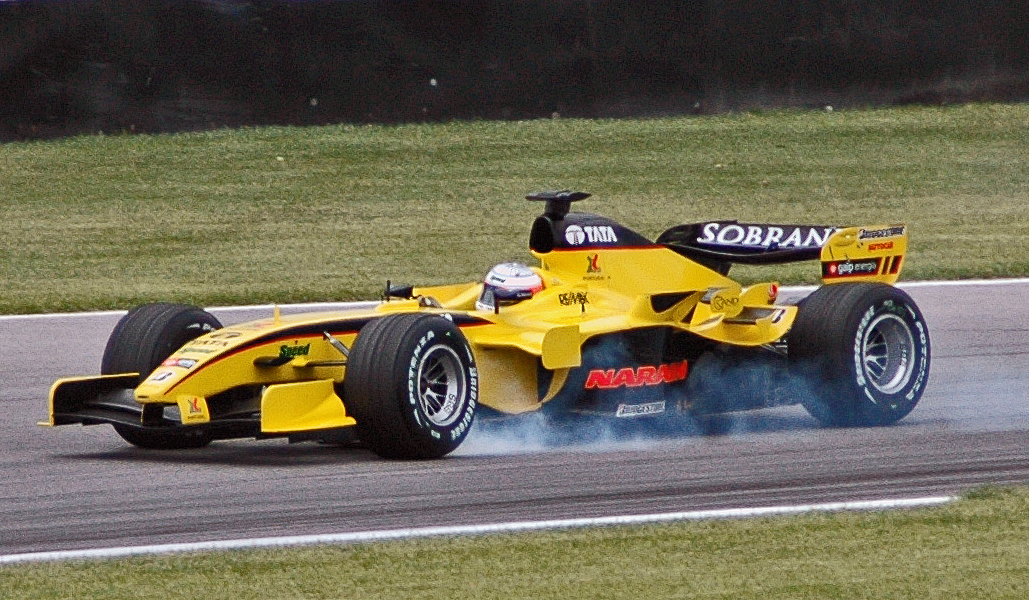
Jordan driver Narain Karthikeyan locking his brakes during qualifying

Pos.	No	Driver	Constructor	Lap	Gap	Grid
1	16	(Italy) Jarno Trulli	Toyota	1:10.625	—N/a	1
2	9	(Finland) Kimi Räikkönen	McLaren-Mercedes	1:10.694	+0.069	2
3	3	(United Kingdom) Jenson Button	BAR-Honda	1:11.277	+0.652	3
4	6	(Italy) Giancarlo Fisichella	Renault	1:11.290	+0.665	4
5	1	(Germany) Michael Schumacher	Ferrari	1:11.369	+0.744	5
6	5	(Spain) Fernando Alonso	Renault	1:11.380	+0.755	6
7	2	(Brazil) Rubens Barrichello	Ferrari	1:11.431	+0.806	7
8	4	(Japan) Takuma Sato	BAR-Honda	1:11.497	+0.872	8
9	7	(Australia) Mark Webber	Williams-BMW	1:11.527	+0.902	9
10	12	(Brazil) Felipe Massa	Sauber-Petronas	1:11.555	+0.930	10
11	10	(Colombia) Juan Pablo Montoya	McLaren-Mercedes	1:11.681	+1.056	11
12	11	(Canada) Jacques Villeneuve	Sauber-Petronas	1:11.691	+1.066	12
13	17	(Brazil) Ricardo Zonta	Toyota	1:11.754	+1.129	13
14	15	(Austria) Christian Klien	Red Bull-Cosworth	1:12.132	+1.507	14
15	8	(Germany) Nick Heidfeld	Williams-BMW	1:12.430	+1.805	15
16	14	(United Kingdom) David Coulthard	Red Bull-Cosworth	1:12.682	+2.057	16
17	18	(Portugal) Tiago Monteiro	Jordan-Toyota	1:13.462	+2.837	17
18	21	(Netherlands) Christijan Albers	Minardi-Cosworth	1:13.632	+3.007	18
19	19	(India) Narain Karthikeyan	Jordan-Toyota	1:13.776	+3.151	19
20	20	(Austria) Patrick Friesacher	Minardi-Cosworth	1:14.494	+3.869	20

== Pre-race controversy ==
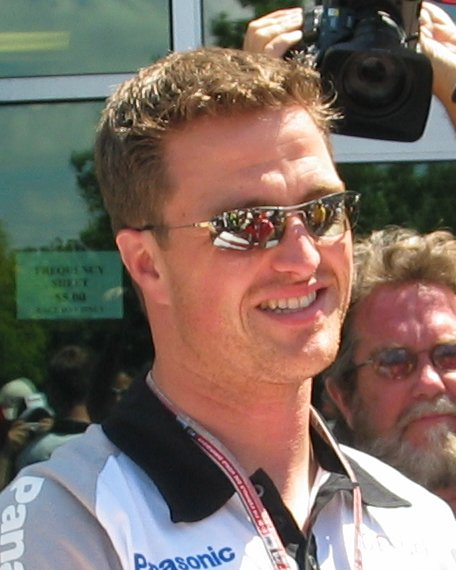
Ralf Schumacher at an autograph session before the practice session where he crashed in Turn 13.

=== Michelin tyre failures ===
During the afternoon's practice session on June 17, 2005, Ralf Schumacher, driving for Toyota, crashed badly in Turn 13 of the Indianapolis Motor Speedway road course, as a result of a left-rear tyre failure. He was unable to continue racing, and was replaced for the rest of the weekend by the team's test driver, Ricardo Zonta, who himself suffered a left-rear tyre failure during practice as well. Schumacher had crashed in the same spot as a result of a tyre failure the previous year, while driving for the Williams team, which led to a broken back.

Turn 13 on the Indianapolis Motor Speedway road course was a high-speed banked turn, unique at the time in Formula One racing, which causes a greater than usual tyre loading. This section of the track had been repaved since the previous Grand Prix with a more abrasive surface using a technique known as diamond grinding which may have placed the tyres under even greater load than before. On June 18, Michelin reported that it did not understand why the tyres it had provided for its seven customer teams—BAR, McLaren, Red Bull, Renault, Sauber, Toyota, and Williams—had failed in this turn, and announced its intention to fly in tyres of a different specification from its Clermont-Ferrand headquarters. The replacement tyres flown in, which were of the type used in the Spanish Grand Prix earlier that year, turned out to have the same problem when tested.

=== Correspondence between Michelin and the FIA ===
In a letter to FIA Race Director Charlie Whiting dated June 18, Michelin representatives Pierre Dupasquier and Nick Shorrock revealed that they did not know the cause of the Toyota tyre failures, and unless the cars could be slowed down in Turn 13, they could not guarantee the tyres' safety for more than 10 laps. Whiting replied on Sunday, June 19, expressing his surprise that Michelin had not brought suitable tyres, suggesting that the teams should limit their drivers to the maximum safe speed specified by Michelin in Turn 13. He also addressed several solutions which had been proposed by the teams, insisting that use of the new specification tyres flown in overnight would be "a breach of the rules to be considered by the stewards", and the placement of a chicane in the turn was "out of the question" – the race would not be sanctioned by the FIA (making it a non-championship race) if the track layout was changed. He deemed the Michelin teams' proposals to be "grossly unfair" to the Bridgestone teams.

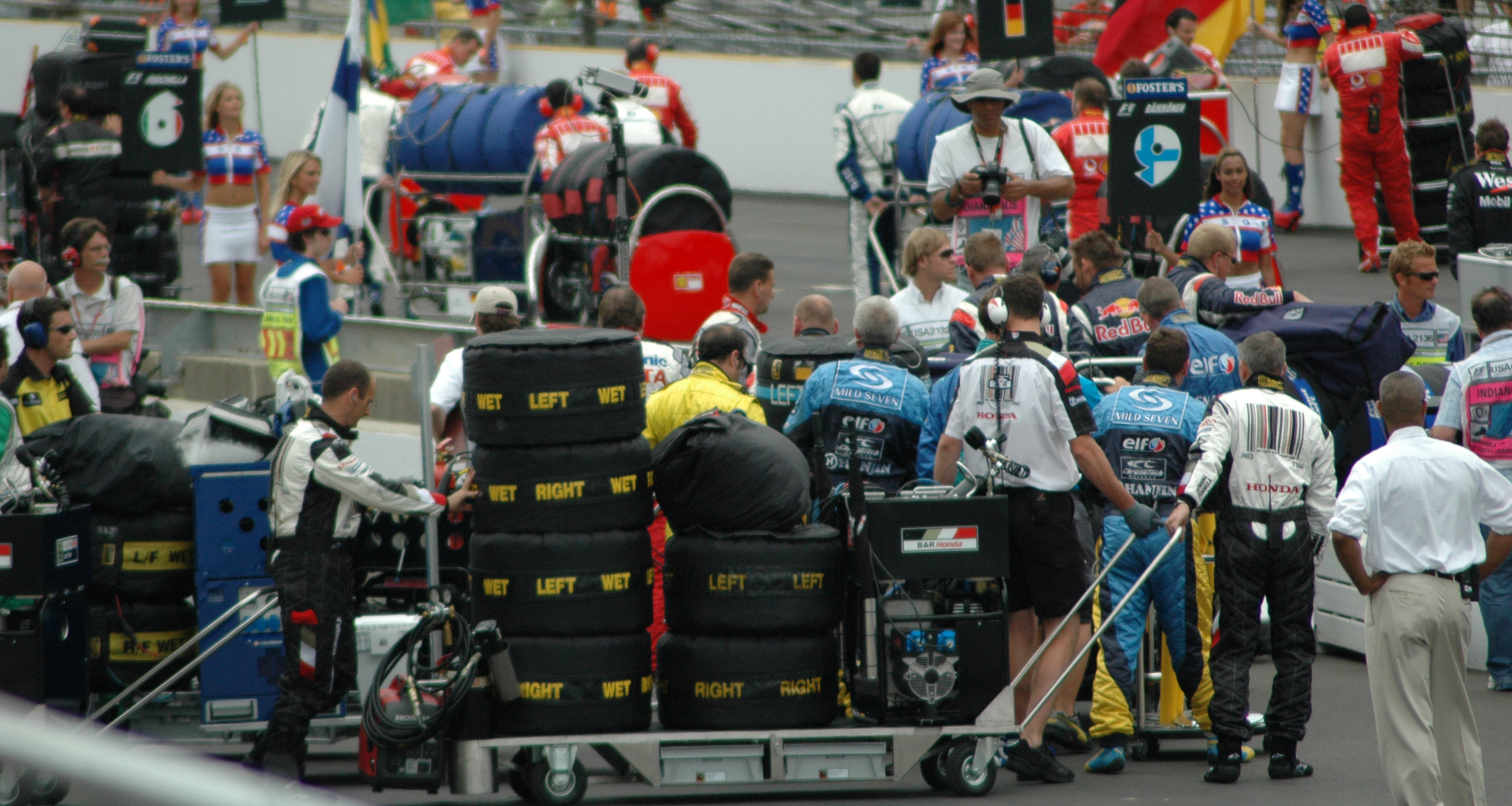
Tyre issues caused the race to be run with only six competitors.

In a second letter, also dated June 18, Dupasquier and Shorrock confirmed that they would not permit their teams to race on the Michelin tyres used during qualification without changes to the circuit, and reiterated their request to slow down Turn 13. Whiting's brief reply maintained that no such change would be permitted, and gave the teams the choice of limiting speeds through Turn 13, using tyres of a different specification to those used in qualifying, subject to a penalty, or changing tyres repeatedly, which would have been permitted if a driver's safety were at issue.

=== Attempts at compromise ===
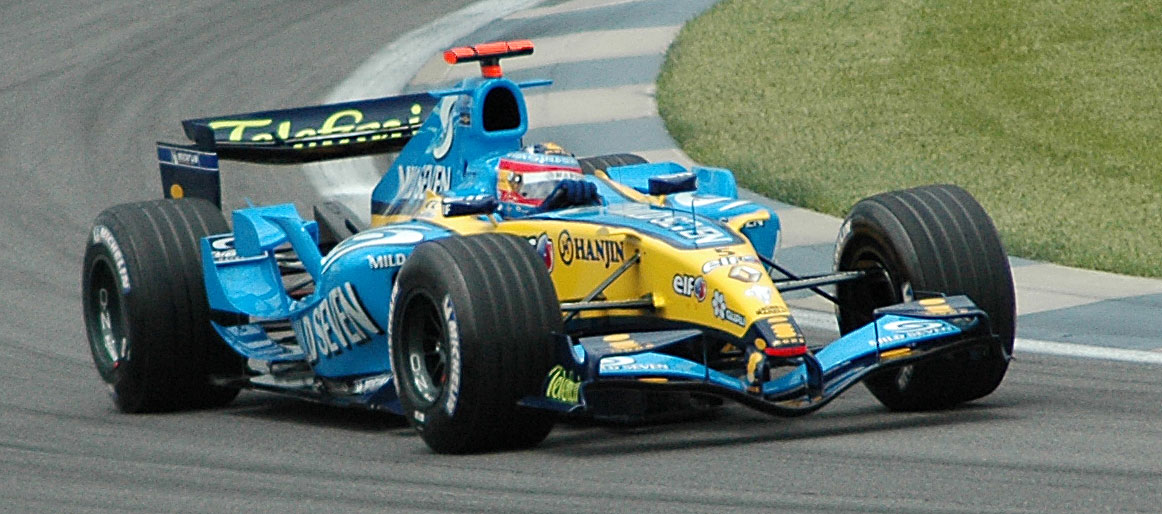
Alonso qualifying for the race

Paul Stoddart, the owner of Minardi, a team using Bridgestone tyres, published an account on June 22, of the events leading up to the race. Stoddart recorded a meeting around 10:00am on the day of the race, to which Speedway president Tony George, two senior Michelin representatives, Bernie Ecclestone (president and CEO of Formula One Management and Formula One Administration), the team principals, and the teams' Michelin technical representatives were summoned. All invited were present except Jean Todt, Team Principal of Scuderia Ferrari. The Michelin representatives stated their position that the tyres provided to the teams could not safely complete the race distance, and requested that the Bridgestone teams, represented by Stoddart and Jordan's Colin Kolles, permit the installation of a chicane in Turn 13. Those present discussed and agreed to reject the FIA's solution of speed-limiting the Michelin cars in the turn because of the potential for accidents. They likewise dismissed the possibility of making pit stops every ten laps, resolved that a chicane was the best solution, and instructed several technical representatives to prepare plans for its installation. Bernie Ecclestone offered to consult Todt, who had not come to the meeting, and the president of the FIA, Max Mosley, who was not present at the race, and reconvene the meeting when he had responses.

Ecclestone returned at about 10:55 to inform the group that Todt had refused to agree to the chicane, maintaining that it was an FIA and a Michelin problem and not his. By the time Stoddart's account of the meeting was published, Todt had already denied that he had ever been consulted, but stated that, if asked, he would not have agreed to the chicane. Furthermore, Ecclestone reported that Mosley had "stated that if any attempts were made to alter the circuit, he would cancel the Grand Prix forthwith".

=== Team principals' plan ===
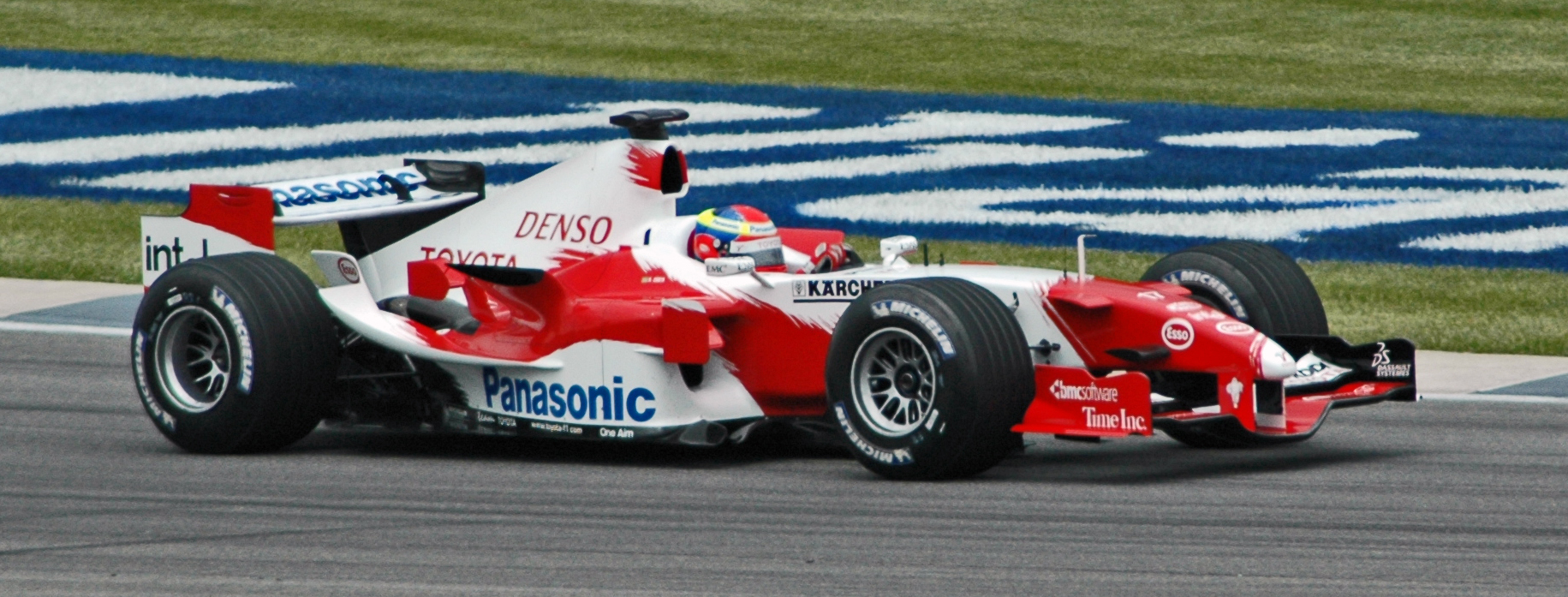
As Ralf Schumacher was injured, Ricardo Zonta qualified the Toyota instead of him.

The group, according to Stoddart, continued to propose alternative solutions, including "a non-championship race, or a race in which the Michelin teams could not score points, and even a race whereby only the Michelin teams used the new chicane", but eventually agreed that the best option was to install the chicane and run a non-championship race, without Ferrari if necessary. To ignore the FIA's instructions and carry on the race would have resulted in the FIA's withdrawing its staff, so the group appointed delegates to fill the various offices, including a race director to replace Charlie Whiting and a safety car driver to replace Bernd Mayländer. The team principals were instructed to convey to their teams and drivers that, in the absence of FIA scrutineers and equipment, the technical rules could not be enforced, and that they were to conduct themselves honourably and in the interest of an entertaining race.

They proceeded to summon the twenty drivers and present their plan. Of the drivers' opinions, Stoddart writes: "While I cannot testify that each and every driver agreed with what we were proposing, what I can say with certainty is that no driver disagreed." The Ferrari drivers expressed no opinion in the matter, leaving the decision to Todt, who was not present. The nine team principals who were present then resolved that, unless they and the FIA could come to a decision in the best interest of the sport, they would not participate in the race.

Turn 13, the centre of the controversy

After a short break, the group gathered again in Ecclestone's office to find Renault team principal Flavio Briatore on the phone with Max Mosley. Mosley had apparently rejected all of their proposals, and it was stated that "Mosley had informed Mr. Martin, the FIA's most senior representative in the USA, that if any kind of non-championship race was run, or any alteration made to the circuit, the US Grand Prix, and indeed, all FIA-regulated motorsport in the US, would be under threat". On the same day that Stoddart's version of events was published, the FIA issued a statement denying that Mosley had made the reported threat, or that any such conversation had taken place.

Having exhausted their options, the Michelin team principals, Stoddart, and Bernie Ecclestone – but not Jordan's Colin Kolles – discussed whether their cars should proceed to the grid, and decided that they should participate in the formation lap but that they could not race. Stoddart asked Kolles if he would be allowing his cars to take part and was informed that Jordan would indeed be racing, despite having previously agreed not to. Stoddart was then approached by a Bridgestone representative and told that Bridgestone wanted him to race; he has also stated that given his "current relationship with Mr Mosley, [he] felt certain heavy sanctions would follow if [he] did not [race]." Stoddart too decided to allow his drivers to start, but reported that he would retire them if the Jordans did not finish the race.

== Race report ==
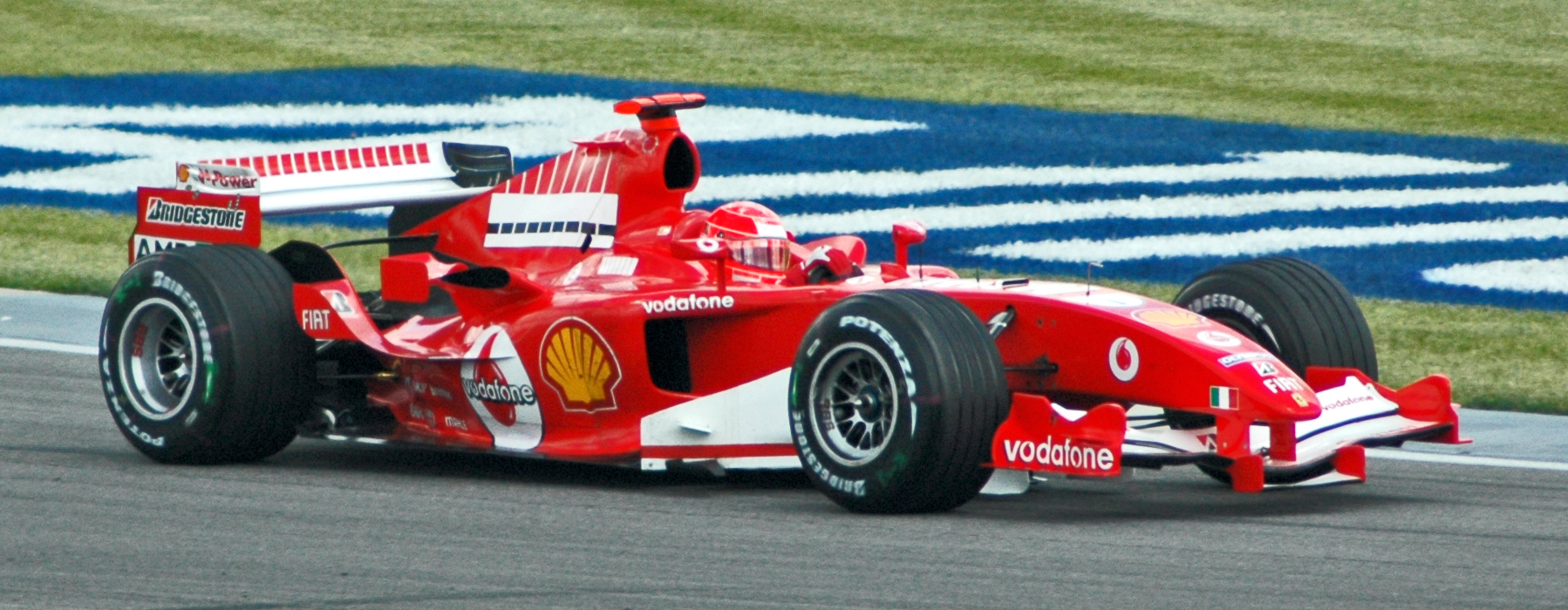
Ferrari's Michael Schumacher (here pictured in qualifying) took his first, and only, win of the season.

At the start of the race, all the cars lined up on the grid per FIA race procedure. As Charlie Whiting signalled the green light to start the formation lap, a full field of twenty cars set off as normal for a single lap before forming the starting grid. At the banked Turn 13, the entrance to the pit lane and the turn that was the centre of the controversy, all teams that ran Michelin tyres returned to their pit box areas, leaving just six cars from the three Bridgestone teams (Ferrari, Jordan, and Minardi) to start the race.

The move by the teams, to come to the grid and then pull out after the formation lap into the pit lane, infuriated the fans, who did not know about the plan. BBC Radio broadcaster Maurice Hamilton said of the event, "Without question, it was the strangest race I commentated on in F1." Because of the retirement of the drivers who qualified ahead of them, Michael Schumacher and his Ferrari teammate, Barrichello, were the foremost starters, although using the grid positions they had qualified in; the pair were followed by Tiago Monteiro and Narain Karthikeyan, both driving for Jordan. Rounding out the remaining field of six were Christijan Albers and Patrick Friesacher of Minardi. Schumacher retained the lead when the race started, and the only changes in positioning came when Albers overtook Karthikeyan but lost the position again later on in the race. The two Ferrari drivers quickly built a significant lead over their rivals. By lap 10, many of the estimated 100,000 to 130,000 attendees had begun to leave the grandstands. Thousands of fans were reported to have gone to the Indianapolis Motor Speedway ticket office to demand refunds, and police were called to keep the peace. Boos were heard throughout the race, and some upset fans threw beer cans and water bottles on the track.

The race was a story of pit strategy, as the only passing on the circuit was of lapped traffic. Albers was the only car to run a three pit stop race, as all other drivers chose to stop only twice. The only lead changes came on lap 26, as Schumacher's 32-second stop gave Barrichello the lead, and on lap 51, as Schumacher turned in the quickest pit stop at 23.615 seconds, giving him enough time to exit the pit lane at the same time as Barrichello, with the result of forcing Barrichello into the grass of Turn One. After this incident, which was not investigated by race officials, both Ferrari drivers were reminded over their radios not to crash out of the race, and they both settled into a slower pace, comfortably ahead of the rest of the field. Schumacher ended up with the victory, his 84th career win and 4th win overall in the US Grand Prix and the 3rd consecutive win in this event. He finished 1.522 seconds ahead of second-placed Barrichello. Monteiro and Karthikeyan finished 3rd and 4th respectively, more than a lap down. The Minardis of Albers and Friesacher were fifth and sixth, two laps behind the race winner. All four of the drivers for Jordan and Minardi scored their first points in Formula One at this race. Karthikeyan's points were the first and only for an Indian driver in Formula One. This was also the final race at which the Minardi team tallied points and the only one where Albers and Friesacher scored points.

At the podium ceremony, at which none of the scheduled dignitaries were present, all Ferrari team members quietly accepted their awards, and quickly exited. Monteiro stayed behind to celebrate his first and only podium finish.

=== Race classification ===
Pos.	No	Driver	Constructor	Tyre	Laps	Time/Retired	Grid	Points
1	1	(Germany) Michael Schumacher	Ferrari	B	73	1:29:43.181	5	10
2	2	(Brazil) Rubens Barrichello	Ferrari	B	73	+1.522	7	8
3	18	(Portugal) Tiago Monteiro	Jordan-Toyota	B	72	+1 lap	17	6
4	19	(India) Narain Karthikeyan	Jordan-Toyota	B	72	+1 lap	19	5
5	21	(Netherlands) Christijan Albers	Minardi-Cosworth	B	71	+2 laps	18	4
6	20	(Austria) Patrick Friesacher	Minardi-Cosworth	B	71	+2 laps	20	3
DNS	16	(Italy) Jarno Trulli	Toyota	M	0	Withdrew (tyres)	1	
DNS	9	(Finland) Kimi Räikkönen	McLaren-Mercedes	M	0	Withdrew (tyres)	2	
DNS	3	(United Kingdom) Jenson Button	BAR-Honda	M	0	Withdrew (tyres)	3	
DNS	6	(Italy) Giancarlo Fisichella	Renault	M	0	Withdrew (tyres)	4	
DNS	5	(Spain) Fernando Alonso	Renault	M	0	Withdrew (tyres)	6	
DNS	4	(Japan) Takuma Sato	BAR-Honda	M	0	Withdrew (tyres)	8	
DNS	7	(Australia) Mark Webber	Williams-BMW	M	0	Withdrew (tyres)	9	
DNS	12	(Brazil) Felipe Massa	Sauber-Petronas	M	0	Withdrew (tyres)	10	
DNS	10	(Colombia) Juan Pablo Montoya	McLaren-Mercedes	M	0	Withdrew (tyres)	11	
DNS	11	(Canada) Jacques Villeneuve	Sauber-Petronas	M	0	Withdrew (tyres)	12	
DNS	17	(Brazil) Ricardo Zonta	Toyota	M	0	Withdrew (tyres)	13	
DNS	15	(Austria) Christian Klien	Red Bull-Cosworth	M	0	Withdrew (tyres)	14	
DNS	8	(Germany) Nick Heidfeld	Williams-BMW	M	0	Withdrew (tyres)	15	
DNS	14	(United Kingdom) David Coulthard	Red Bull-Cosworth	M	0	Withdrew (tyres)	16	

== Aftermath ==
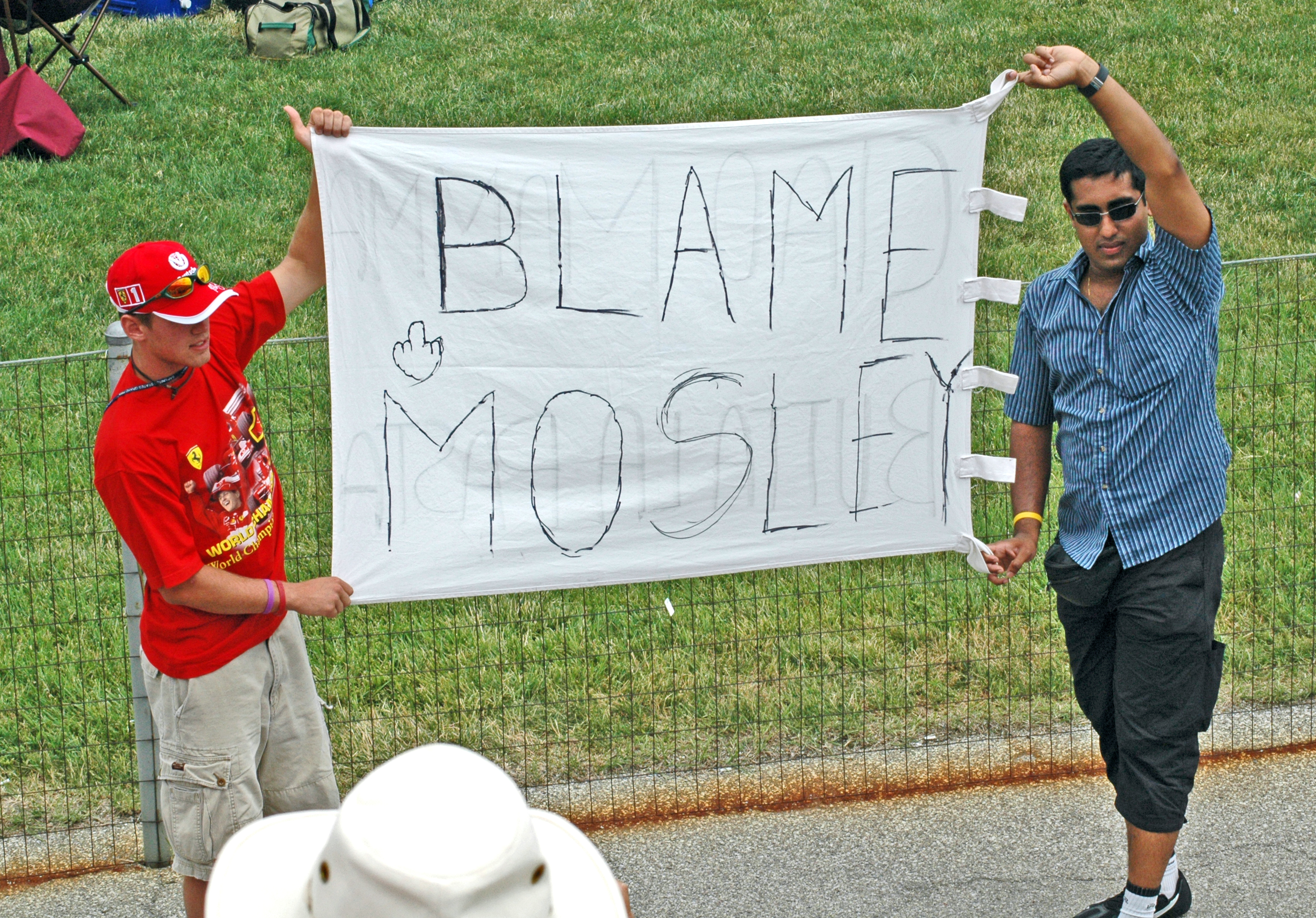
Disgruntled fans blaming FIA president Max Mosley for the events of the race

The win, Schumacher's only victory of 2005, moved him from fifth to third in the World Drivers' Championship. Alonso and Räikkönen remained first and second in the championship standings, with 59 and 37 points respectively, while Schumacher moved up to 34 points. With his second-place finish, Barrichello went into fourth in the drivers championship, with 29 points, and Trulli dropped to fifth with 27 points. The Ferrari team moved into joint second in the Constructors' Championship, matching McLaren with 63 points; both teams trailed Renault, which retained the lead with 76 points. Both Jordan and Minardi scored points, moving out of a tie with BAR-Honda at the bottom of the constructors' standings. The result of the race was overshadowed by the withdrawal of the Michelin-shod teams, and by the inability to find a solution which would have allowed them to race.

Bernie Ecclestone, in answer to a question by ITV's Martin Brundle in an interview just before the start of the race, described the future of Formula One in the United States and the future of Michelin in the sport as "not good". He also said that the "incident's not the fault of the teams, to be honest with you". The race was labelled a farce, and David Coulthard said that "it throws into doubt the future of the race in US". Associated Press writer Stephen Wade pointed to the boycott as an extension of previous disagreements between the teams and Max Mosley, which had led to the threatened creation of a rival series as an alternative to Formula One. The Guardian's Richard Williams considered the prior disputes a factor in the failure to reach a compromise and felt that the events at this race had increased the risk of a complete rupture.

Minardi boss Paul Stoddart was noticeably angry with the FIA both during and after the race, calling the race a "farce". He went on to say that the points battle between Jordan Grand Prix and Minardi was ruined during an interview during the race, saying: "This is fucking crazy! The FIA needs to get a grip with itself and sort this sport out before there's no fucking sport to sort out. The championship's over for Minardi. We were only fighting Jordan. This bullshit race means that the season finishes here. We can't ever overtake the points from today. It's over. It's screwed up the little fight between Minardi and Jordan that was getting quite good." After the race, Stoddart admitted immediately that nine teams – all but Ferrari – agreed not to race, and had Jordan not reversed its decision at the last minute, Minardi would also have boycotted the race. In his later lengthier statement, he indicated that although it had been Michelin's failure to provide a reliable tyre which had initiated the events, he laid the full blame for the failure to reach some accommodation (which would have allowed a race to happen, for the benefit of the many fans who had paid considerable money for travel and tickets) to Mosley and the FIA, with a small share of the blame going to what he characterized as the obstructionist Ferrari team leader, Jean Todt. He furthermore called for Mosley's resignation.

=== FIA's reaction ===
The following day, the FIA published a justification of its refusal to permit a change in tyres or the installation of a chicane. It contended that Formula One operated under "clear rules" which could not be altered when a team "brings the wrong equipment to a race". It further claimed that a chicane would have resulted in the race being run on a track that had been significantly altered "without following any of the modern safety procedures", which would have exposed FIA to significant legal liability in the event of an accident. The FIA also summoned the seven Michelin-shod teams before the World Motor Sport Council at their headquarters in France, for a hearing on June 29, to explain their failure to participate, by which they had presumably violated the terms of the Concorde Agreement. It later published copies of the letters sent to each team "in the interests of transparency". They were charged with violating article 151c of the International Sporting Code, which refers to "acts prejudicial to the interests of competition or motorsport generally". Specifically, it was charged that they had:

- Failed to ensure availability of suitable tyres for the race.
- Wrongfully refused to allow cars to start the race.
- Wrongfully refused to allow cars to race subject to speed restrictions at one corner, which was safe for such tyres available.
- Combined with other teams to make a demonstration damaging to the image of Formula 1 by pulling into the pits immediately before the start of the race.
- Failed to notify the stewards of their intention not to race.

On June 22, the FIA produced a press release from Max Mosley, in the form of a question-and-answer session, in an effort to clarify the FIA's stand on the controversy. In it, Mosley drew an analogy to a hypothetical situation where the engines from one manufacturer had oil starvation problems due to high lateral loading in one corner, and pointed out that those cars would simply have been forced to run slower as a result. He reiterated that the reason for not installing the chicane was purely that it had never been tested and was thereby deemed unsafe. He pointed out that the alternatives that the FIA suggested were feasible, and wondered why the teams did not use the pitlane as an alternative, especially when, with only six Bridgestone cars, the Michelin teams could still compete for the points scoring seventh and eighth places.

On June 29, the FIA World Motor Sport Council found the teams guilty of not being in possession of suitable tyres, "but with strong mitigating circumstances", and failure to allow their cars to start the race. The teams were found not guilty of the other three counts. The punishment was not decided, and was to be announced on September 14. On July 22, the FIA World Motor Sport Council voted to overturn its previous decision, and exonerated the Michelin teams of all charges. The decision was due to "evidence previously submitted to the FIA Senate". According to BBC Sport, Dennis and Red Bull principal Christian Horner told Mosley and the FIA Senate that Indiana state law left the Michelin teams no option but to pull out of the race. They contended that had they competed, they potentially faced criminal charges for knowingly putting others at risk even if no accident actually occurred. Horner later stated in an interview that whilst it was "incredibly difficult" pulling out of the race, "there were things going on that were bigger than the sport that day".

=== Compensation ===
On June 28, Michelin announced that it would offer compensation to all race fans who had purchased tickets for the Grand Prix. The company planned to issue refund cheques through the Speedway ticket office for the price of all tickets for the race by the end of September. Additionally, Michelin purchased 20,000 tickets for the 2006 United States Grand Prix to be distributed to spectators who attended the 2005 race. In addition to the refunded tickets, there was some discussion about holding a second, non-championship race at Indianapolis. On July 2, at the 2005 French Grand Prix, McLaren team principal Ron Dennis suggested that an additional race could be held at the American circuit after the last official race of the season, the 2005 Chinese Grand Prix. The teams had apparently already discussed the idea with Bernie Ecclestone. The next day, Tony George dismissed the possibility, saying: "There will be no race at Indianapolis Motor Speedway this fall."

At the Grand Prix of Cleveland, held one week after the US Grand Prix as part of the 2005 Champ Car World Series season, free admission was granted to all bearers of ticket stubs of the US Grand Prix.

== Friday drivers ==
Teams that were not in the top four of the 2004 Constructors' Championship standings were entitled to run a third car in free practice on Friday. These drivers drove on Friday but did not compete in qualifying or the race, with the exception of Ricardo Zonta, who replaced Ralf Schumacher after his practice accident.

Constructor	Driver
McLaren-Mercedes	(Spain) Pedro de la Rosa
Sauber-Petronas	None
Red Bull-Cosworth	(United States) Scott Speed
Toyota	(Brazil) Ricardo Zonta
Jordan-Toyota	(Monaco) Robert Doornbos
Minardi-Cosworth	None

== Championship standings after the race ==
Drivers' Championship standings

	Pos	Driver	Points
	1	(Spain) Fernando Alonso	59
	2	(Finland) Kimi Räikkönen	37
2	3	(Germany) Michael Schumacher	34
3	4	(Brazil) Rubens Barrichello	29
2	5	(Italy) Jarno Trulli	27

Constructors' Championship standings

	Pos	Constructor	Points
	1	(France) Renault	76
	2	(United Kingdom) McLaren-Mercedes	63
2	3	(Italy) Ferrari	63
1	4	(United Kingdom) Williams-BMW	47
1	5	(Japan) Toyota	47

- Note: Only the top five positions are included for both sets of standings.

== Notes ==
Previous race: 2005 Canadian Grand Prix	FIA Formula One World Championship; 2005 season	Next race: 2005 French Grand Prix
Previous race: 2004 United States Grand Prix	United States Grand Prix	Next race: 2006 United States Grand Prix
