= 2003 Monaco F3000 round =

Motor car race in Monaco

- Race 4 of 10 in the 2003 International Formula 3000 Championship

Race details
- Date: 31 May 2003
- Location: Circuit de Monaco, Monaco
- Course: Street circuit
- Course length: 3.340 km (2.075 miles)
- Distance: 45 laps, 150.300 km (93.396 miles)

Pole position
Driver	(Sweden) Björn Wirdheim	Arden International
- Time: 1:25.881

Fastest lap
Driver	(Sweden) Björn Wirdheim	Arden International
- Time: 1:27.384 on lap 12

Podium
First	(Denmark) Nicolas Kiesa	Den Blå Avis
Second	(Sweden) Björn Wirdheim	Arden International
Third	(Italy) Raffaele Giammaria	Durango

The 2003 Monaco F3000 round was a motor racing event held on 31 May 2003 at the Circuit de Monaco, Monaco. It was the fourth round of the 2003 International Formula 3000 Championship, and was held in support of the 2003 Monaco Grand Prix. This race was notable because Björn Wirdheim stopped short of the finish line to 'celebrate' with his team. This allowed Nicolas Kiesa to pass him and win the race.

== Classification ==
=== Qualifying ===
Pos.	No.	Driver	Team	Time	Gap	Grid
1	1	(Sweden) Björn Wirdheim	Arden International	1:25.881		1
2	3	(Brazil) Ricardo Sperafico	Coloni Motorsport	1:26.160	+0.279	2
3	9	(Italy) Giorgio Pantano	Durango	1:26.257	+0.376	3
4	16	(Italy) Vitantonio Liuzzi	Red Bull Junior Team F3000	1:26.488	+0.607	4
5	6	(Italy) Enrico Toccacelo	Super Nova Racing	1:26.694	+0.813	5
6	7	(Denmark) Nicolas Kiesa	Den Blå Avis	1:27.204	+1.323	6
7	12	(Belgium) Jeffrey van Hooydonk	Team Astromega	1:27.291	+1.410	7
8	14	(Czech Republic) Jaroslav Janiš	Superfund ISR - Charouz	1:27.605	+1.724	8
9	10	(Italy) Raffaele Giammaria	Durango	1:27.674	+1.793	9
10	4	(Hungary) Zsolt Baumgartner	Coloni Motorsport	1:27.744	+1.863	10
11	19	(Italy) Alessandro Piccolo	BCN F3000	1:27.835	+1.954	11
12	15	(France) Yannick Schroeder	Superfund ISR - Charouz	1:27.988	+2.107	12
13	17	(Austria) Bernhard Auinger	Red Bull Junior Team F3000	1:28.394	+2.513	13
14	5	(United States) Derek Hill	Super Nova Racing	1:28.673	+2.792	14
15	8	(United States) Phil Giebler	Den Blå Avis	1:29.038	+3.157	15
16	11	(Germany) Tony Schmidt	Team Astromega	1:29.671	+3.790	16
17	18	(United States) Will Langhorne	BCN F3000	1:41.809	+15.928	17
18	2	(United States) Townsend Bell	Arden International	1:59.134	+33.253	18
Lähde:

=== Race ===
Pos	No	Driver	Team	Laps	Time/Retired	Grid	Points
1	7	(Denmark) Nicolas Kiesa	Den Blå Avis	45	1:09.21.483	6	10
2	1	(Sweden) Björn Wirdheim	Arden International	45	+0.895	1	8
3	10	(Italy) Raffaele Giammaria	Durango	45	+3.353	9	6
4	14	(Czech Republic) Jaroslav Janiš	Superfund ISR - Charouz	45	+3.845	8	5
5	4	(Hungary) Zsolt Baumgartner	Coloni Motorsport	45	+4.550	10	4
6	2	(United States) Townsend Bell	Arden International	45	+5.354	18	3
7	15	(France) Yannick Schroeder	Superfund ISR - Charouz	45	+15.858	12	2
8	12	(Belgium) Jeffrey van Hooydonk	Team Astromega	45	+16.885	7	1
9	17	(Austria) Bernhard Auinger	Red Bull Junior Team F3000	44	+1 lap	13	
10	18	(United States) Will Langhorne	BCN F3000	43	+2 laps	17	
Ret	9	(Italy) Giorgio Pantano	Durango	39	Retired	3	
Ret	16	(Italy) Vitantonio Liuzzi	Red Bull Junior Team F3000	34	Retired	4	
Ret	6	(Italy) Enrico Toccacelo	Super Nova Racing	34	Retired	5	
Ret	11	(Germany) Tony Schmidt	Team Astromega	25	Retired	16	
Ret	8	(United States) Phil Giebler	Den Blå Avis	0	Retired	15	
DNS	19	(Italy) Alessandro Piccolo	BCN F3000	0	Retired	11	
DSQ	3	(Brazil) Ricardo Sperafico	Coloni Motorsport	39	Disqualified	2	
DSQ	5	(United States) Derek Hill	Super Nova Racing	17	Disqualified	14	
Lähde:

== Standings after the event ==
Drivers' Championship standings

	Pos.	Driver	Points
	1	(Sweden) Björn Wirdheim	34
	2	(Brazil) Ricardo Sperafico	16
	3	(Italy) Giorgio Pantano	16
	4	(Italy) Enrico Toccacelo	14
5	5	(Denmark) Nicolas Kiesa	13

Teams' Championship standings

	Pos.	Team	Points
	1	(United Kingdom) Arden International	39
1	2	(Italy) Durango	24
1	3	(Italy) Coloni Motorsport	22
	4	(Austria) Red Bull Junior Team F3000	18
	5	(Czech Republic) Superfund ISR - Charouz	16

- Note: Only the top five positions are included for both sets of standings.

== See also ==
- 2003 Monaco Grand Prix

Previous round: 2003 A1-Ring F3000 round	International Formula 3000 Championship; 2003 season	Next round: 2003 Nürburgring F3000 round
Previous round: 2002 Monaco F3000 round	Monaco F3000 round	Next round: 2004 Monaco F3000 round
