= Piquet GP =

Motor racing team

(Brazil) Piquet GP
- Founded: 1997 (as GP Racing); 2000 (as Piquet Sports)
- Founder(s): Tancredi Pagiaro (GP Racing); Nelson Piquet (Piquet Sports)
- Folded: 2009
- Base: Veggiano, Padua, Italy
- Former series: GP2 Series; GP2 Asia Series; Formula 3000; Italian Formula 3000; A1 Grand Prix; British Formula Three Championship; Formula 3 Sudamericana
- Noted drivers: (Italy) Thomas Biagi (Italy) Fabrizio del Monte (Venezuela) Pastor Maldonado (Brazil) Diego Nunes (Italy) Fabio Onidi (Brazil) Nelson Piquet Jr. (Italy) Davide Rigon
- Teams' Championships: Euroseries 3000: 2007
- Drivers' Championships: Formula 3 Sudamericana; 2002: Nelson Piquet Jr. British Formula Three Championship: 2004: Nelson Piquet Jr. Euroseries 3000: 2007: Davide Rigon

Piquet GP, formerly known as Minardi Piquet Sports or Minardi by Piquet Sports and Piquet Sports, is a motor racing team. The team's history can be traced back to when the GP Racing team was founded in 1997, and also to when Piquet Sports was created in 2000 by triple world champion Nelson Piquet. In 2007, Piquet Sports and GP Racing merged to create "Minardi Piquet Sports". In 2008, the team dropped "Minardi" from their name. In early 2009, the team was sold and rebranded as Piquet GP, but changed its name again in November to Rapax Team, once all remaining ties to part-owner Piquet were cut.

== History ==
=== GP Racing ===
GP Racing was founded in 1997 by Tancredi Pagiaro to compete in the Italian Formula Three Championship. The team then debuted in the FIA International Formula 3000 championship in 1998 with French driver, Cyrille Sauvage, only managing two points. In 1999 they expanded to two cars with Italian, Fabrizio Gollin in one car and Giovanni Montanari, Gastón Mazzacane and Laurent Delahaye sharing the second. However, none of the drivers managed to score points

Towards the end of 1999, GP Racing entered the Italian F3000 with just a single car driven by Thomas Biagi. Despite only competing in the last 3 races, Biagi scored enough points to end the season 4th in points. In 2000, Swiss driver Gabriele Gardel joined the team in a second car alongside Biagi. It was a somewhat disappointing season with Biagi only ending the season 5th with Gardel failing to score. GP Racing came 6th in the teams championship. Both Biagi and Gardel continued with the team in 2001. Biagi had a much better season taking the GP Racing's first win at Donington Park on his way to 2nd in the championship. Gardel came 9th overall while the team came 2nd in the teams championship. 2002 was once again a peak season: GP Racing came 4th out of the 14 teams that participated on the constructor's classification with Alessandro Piccolo and Martin Basso. In 2003 for the third consecutive year, GP Racing competed in Euro 3000 Series Championship with promising young talents behind the wheel: Italian Fabrizio Del Monte, Russian Roman Rusinov and young Belgian Maxime Hodencq who replaced Rusinov for the last two races. Once again, it was a positive season for the team: Del Monte was second in the driver's classification and GP Racing was third in the constructor's title. In 2004, GP Racing confirmed its position at the top in Superfund Euro 3000 as well with Tor Graves joining Del Monte and Hodencq in a third car for the team. The title slipped out of Del Monte's hands during the last race by one point only. The Italian had already conquered three wins, various podiums and was in the lead for 9 out of 10 races. An unfortunate collision with Graves at the start of the last round took the joy of winning the much deserved title away from Fabrizio and GP Racing. Hodencq scored 3 points on the way to 11th overall while Graves failed to score.

In 2005 GP Racing participated in the Italian F3000 Championship with the Lola BO2 driven by Fabrizio Del Monte and by the débuting Juan Caceres who ended the season 5th. Alex Lloyd and Toni Vilander also raced for the team later in the season after Del Monte left. GP Racing took 3rd in the teams championship. The team also participated in the LMES Championship with Promec (only one race in Monza).

In 2006, GP Racing linked-up with Gian Carlo Minardi to form the Minardi Team by GP Racing, which competed with good results in the new Euroseries 3000. Caceres stayed on with the team alongside Christiano Rocha though neither would complete the season. Despite having somewhat of a revolving door with no less than 6 drivers racing throughout the season, the team secured 2nd in the teams championship. Roldan Rodriguez, Diego Nunes, Davide Rigon and Fausto Ippoliti would complete the season while Rocha returned to the team in a third car. Rocha finished the season in 4th while Rodriguez and Caceras were 6th and 7th respectively.

=== Piquet Sports ===
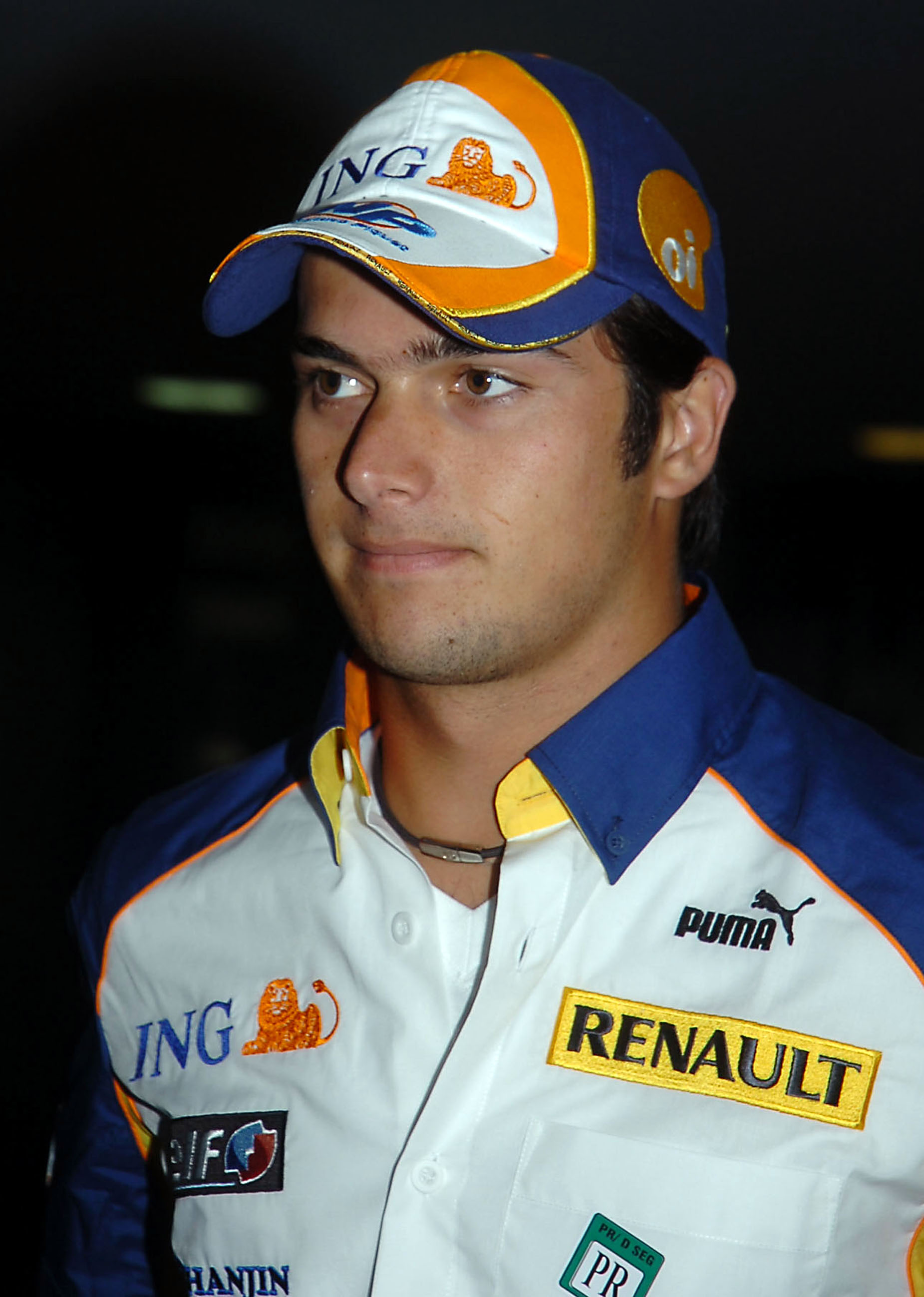
Piquet Sports was created primarily for Nelson Piquet Jr. to race in single-seater Formulae.

Piquet Sports was founded in 2000 by Brazilian Nelson Piquet, a triple Formula One World Drivers' Champion, for his son Nelson Piquet Jr., with Felipe Vargas as the team manager. The team's first competition was the South American Formula Three Championship where Piquet Jr. took second in his first race and won four races later in Cascavel. The young Brazilian finished 5th in the championship with 77 points, while Piquet Sports finished fourth in the team's championship, also scoring 77 points.

"One day Nelson said, 'The first time Nelsinho sits in a race car, it'll be run by you'"

— Felipe Vargas

The team stuck with competing in the South American championship the following year, which they took a majority thirteen of a possible eighteen wins scoring a total of 296 points as Piquet Jr. and Piquet Sports took the Drivers' and Teams' titles respectively, with the Brazilian having a margin of over a hundred points from his nearest rival Danilo Dirani. The team's racing interest went across the Atlantic for 2003 as the team entered the British Formula 3 Championship. The team performed well in their début season, with Piquet Jr. taking six wins over the year with a further five podiums brought his points tally to 231 points, putting him third in the final standings for the Drivers' Championship behind Alan van der Merwe and Jamie Green.

The team's racing involvement was split in 2004 with the team entering Piquet Jr. for a second season in the British championship while bringing their attention back to the South American championship, entering fellow Brazilian Alexandre Negrão. Both Piquet and Negrão took their respective championship crowns, taking a total of sixteen wins between them.

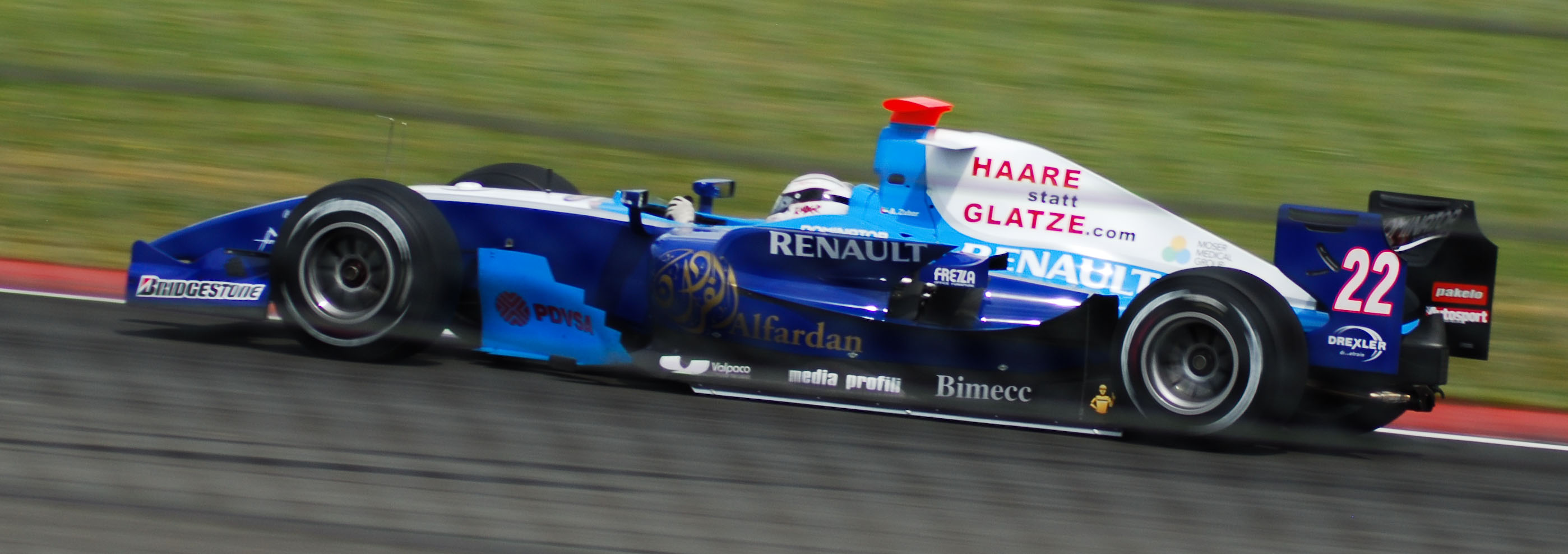
Andreas Zuber driving for Piquet Sports at the 2008 Silverstone GP2 Series round.

The team graduated into the newly formed GP2 series, which replaced Formula 3000 as the feeder series of Formula One. The team entered their two champions Piquet Jr. and Negrão for their debut season in the category. British team HiTech Racing formed an association with the team's GP2 activities but this was terminated midway through 2005. The team finished sixth in their debut season with Piquet scoring a single win at Spa-Francorchamps.

2006 saw Piquet produce their most competitive season to date, with the Piquet Jr. taking four wins and challenging Lewis Hamilton to that year's title. The Brazilian, however, lost out by twelve points to the Brit and the team also lost out to Hamilton's ART Grand Prix team in the Teams' Championship.

Piquet Jr. left the squad at the end of 2006 to join Renault Formula One team as the team's test driver.

=== Merger of GP Racing and Piquet Sports ===
Piquet Sports merged with GP Racing ahead of the 2007 season to create "Minardi by Piquet Sports". Spaniard Roldán Rodríguez was employed to replace Piquet Jr. The newly named team enjoyed little, if any, success in 2007 GP2 Series season with Negrão failing to take the mantle of team leader and only scored a single podium position. The team finished the year with 22 points and outside the top ten in the Teams' Championship. In the Euro Series 3000 GP Racing won both the drivers and teams championship both with Davide Rigon and Diego Nunes completing a championship 1–2.

For 2008, the Minardi name was dropped from the team's title. 2008 saw the team gain some success, with Italian Marco Bonanomi taking a win in the newly formed Asia series and new signing Pastor Maldonado, winner of the previous season's race in Monaco, taking the team's first pole position in the series at the opening round in Catalunya.

2008 would be the team's final year in the Euro Series 3000. Fabio Onidi joined the team alongside the returning Roldan Rodriguez who shared the lead car with Pastor Maldonado and Fabrizio Crestani. Onidi just lost out on the drivers title by 2 points to Nicolas Prost while Crestani ended up 5th. The team also lost out to Bull Racing by 8 points in the battle for the teams championship.

For the 2009 season, the team was renamed Piquet GP and Rodriguez returned to the team alongside Durango exponent Alberto Valerio.

== Controversies ==
During their existence so far in motor racing, Piquet Sports have been involved some controversies over the years, most notably in 2002 when Piquet Jr. won that year's title. A number of teams protested at the team for "illegal testing" over the course of the season, Piquet Sports argued that the newly installed mudflaps on the Dallara made it a "prototype" model – the team escaped punishment.

== Results ==
=== GP2 Series ===
GP2 Series Results
Year	Team name	Car	Drivers	Races	Wins	Poles	Fast laps	Points	D.C.	T.C.
2005	(United Kingdom) Hitech Piquet Sports (Note: Hitech Piquet Sports competed under a British licence. However, before the Istanbul round, it was announced that this partnership had ended and that Piquet Sports would manage the team for the rest of the season. Despite this, team would continue carrying the Hitech name until the end of the season.)	Dallara GP2/05-Mecachrome	(Brazil) Nelson Piquet Jr.	23	1	0	0	46	8th	6th
2005	(United Kingdom) Hitech Piquet Sports	Dallara GP2/05-Mecachrome	(Brazil) Alexandre Negrão	23	0	0	0	4	19th	6th
2006	(Brazil) Piquet Sports	Dallara GP2/05-Mecachrome	(Brazil) Nelson Piquet Jr.	21	4	6	3	102	**2nd**	**2nd**
2006	(Brazil) Piquet Sports	Dallara GP2/05-Mecachrome	(Brazil) Alexandre Negrão	21	0	0	0	13	13th	**2nd**
2007	(Brazil) Minardi Piquet Sports	Dallara GP2/05-Mecachrome	(Brazil) Alexandre Negrão	21	0	0	0	8	20th	11th
2007	(Brazil) Minardi Piquet Sports	Dallara GP2/05-Mecachrome	(Spain) Roldán Rodríguez	21	0	0	0	14	17th	11th
2008	(Brazil) Piquet Sports	Dallara GP2/08-Mecachrome	(Venezuela) Pastor Maldonado	20	1	2	4	60	5th	**3rd**
2008	(Brazil) Piquet Sports	Dallara GP2/08-Mecachrome	(United Arab Emirates) Andreas Zuber	20	0	0	1	32	9th	**3rd**
2009	(Brazil) Piquet GP	Dallara GP2/08-Mecachrome	(Spain) Roldán Rodríguez	20	0	0	0	25	11th	7th
2009	(Brazil) Piquet GP	Dallara GP2/08-Mecachrome	(Brazil) Alberto Valerio	20	1	0	0	16	15th	7th

=== In detail ===
(key) (Races in bold indicate pole position) (Races in italics indicate fastest lap)

Year	Chassis Engine Tyres	Drivers	1	2	3	4	5	6	7	8	9	10	11	12	13	14	15	16	17	18	19	20	21	22	23	T.C.	Points
2005	GP2/05; Renault; **B**		SMR; FEA	SMR; SPR	CAT; FEA	CAT; SPR	MON; FEA	NÜR; FEA	NÜR; SPR	MAG; FEA	MAG; SPR	SIL; FEA	SIL; SPR	HOC; FEA	HOC; SPR	HUN; FEA	HUN; SPR	IST; FEA	IST; SPR	MNZ; FEA	MNZ; SPR	SPA; FEA	SPA; SPR	BHR; FEA	BHR; SPR	6th	50
2005	GP2/05; Renault; **B**	(Brazil) Nelson Piquet Jr.	14†	6	5	2	11†	5	3	Ret	DSQ	Ret	Ret	3	8	15†	10	4	6	3	Ret	1	14	Ret	15	6th	50
2005	GP2/05; Renault; **B**	(Brazil) Alexandre Negrão	Ret	13	8	15	12†	Ret	Ret	Ret	13	19	16†	Ret	18	8	15	12	19	Ret	13	7	7	12	9	6th	50
2006	GP2/05; Renault; **B**		VAL; FEA	VAL; SPR	SMR; FEA	SMR; SPR	NÜR; FEA	NÜR; SPR	CAT; FEA	CAT; SPR	MON; FEA	SIL; FEA	SIL; SPR	MAG; FEA	MAG; SPR	HOC; FEA	HOC; SPR	HUN; FEA	HUN; SPR	IST; FEA	IST; SPR	MNZ; FEA	MNZ; SPR			2nd	115
2006	GP2/05; Renault; **B**	(Brazil) Nelson Piquet Jr.	**1**	4	5	2	**Ret**	19†	**4**	2	12†	4	5	4	2	13	DNS	**1**	1	**1**	5	**2**	6			2nd	115
2006	GP2/05; Renault; **B**	(Brazil) Alexandre Negrão	13	7	Ret	11	7	7	7	18	Ret	Ret	12	5	Ret	16	9	5	Ret	8	Ret	Ret	Ret			2nd	115
2007	GP2/05; Renault; **B**		BHR; FEA	BHR; SPR	CAT; FEA	CAT; SPR	MON; FEA	MAG; FEA	MAG; SPR	SIL; FEA	SIL; SPR	NÜR; FEA	NÜR; SPR	HUN; FEA	HUN; SPR	IST; FEA	IST; SPR	MNZ; FEA	MNZ; SPR	SPA; FEA	SPA; SPR	VAL; FEA	VAL; SPR			11th	22
2007	GP2/05; Renault; **B**	(Brazil) Alexandre Negrão	Ret	15	Ret	DNS	15	Ret	Ret	Ret	18	12	10	Ret	13	7	2	14	Ret	19†	16	15	18			11th	22
2007	GP2/05; Renault; **B**	(Spain) Roldán Rodríguez	Ret	12	4	Ret	Ret	16	9	8	11	10	9	6	3	11	8	Ret	8	15	10	Ret	17			11th	22
2008	GP2/08; Renault; **B**		CAT; FEA	CAT; SPR	IST; FEA	IST; SPR	MON; FEA	MON; FEA	MAG; FEA	MAG; SPR	SIL; FEA	SIL; SPR	HOC; FEA	HOC; SPR	HUN; FEA	HUN; SPR	VAL; FEA	VAL; SPR	SPA; FEA	SPA; SPR	MNZ; FEA	MNZ; SPR				3rd	92
2008	GP2/08; Renault; **B**	(United Arab Emirates) Andreas Zuber	3	Ret	3	Ret	11	17	5	8	7	11	11†	2	2	7	Ret	Ret	DSQ	Ret	Ret	10				3rd	92
2008	GP2/08; Renault; **B**	(Venezuela) Pastor Maldonado	**12**	Ret	Ret	Ret	**2**	Ret	3	7	Ret	15†	6	17	5	18†	2	Ret	3	1	2	4				3rd	92
2009	GP2/08; Renault; **B**		CAT; FEA	CAT; SPR	MON; FEA	MON; FEA	IST; FEA	IST; SPR	SIL; FEA	SIL; SPR	NÜR; FEA	NÜR; SPR	HUN; FEA	HUN; SPR	VAL; FEA	VAL; SPR	SPA; FEA	SPA; SPR	MNZ; FEA	MNZ; SPR	ALG; FEA	ALG; SPR				7th	41
2009	GP2/08; Renault; **B**	(Spain) Roldán Rodríguez	Ret	Ret	11	Ret	Ret	17	12	9	2	Ret	Ret	13	5	Ret	5	2	13	7	5	Ret				7th	41
2009	GP2/08; Renault; **B**	(Brazil) Alberto Valerio	15	13	Ret	Ret	4	6	1	7	Ret	17	Ret	21†	17	10	Ret	12	Ret	11	Ret	7				7th	41

=== GP2 Asia Series ===
(key) (Races in bold indicate pole position) (Races in italics indicate fastest lap)

Year	Chassis Engine Tyres	Drivers	1	2	3	4	5	6	7	8	9	10	11	12	T.C.	Points
2008	GP2/05; Renault; **B**		DUB1; FEA	DUB1; SPR	SEN; FEA	SEN; SPR	SEP; FEA	SEP; SPR	BHR; FEA	BHR; SPR	DUB2; FEA	DUB2; SPR			10th	9
2008	GP2/05; Renault; **B**	(Italy) Marcello Puglisi	16	Ret	DNS	18	13	9	18	Ret	Ret	Ret			10th	9
2008	GP2/05; Renault; **B**	(Italy) Marco Bonanomi	20	13	Ret	8	Ret	15	Ret	Ret	6	1			10th	9
2008–09	GP2/05; Renault; **B**		SHI; FEA	SHI; SPR	DUB3; FEA	DUB3; SPR	BHR1; FEA	BHR1; SPR	LSL; FEA	LSL; SPR	SEP; FEA	SEP; SPR	BHR2; FEA	BHR2; SPR	2nd	59
2008–09	GP2/05; Renault; **B**	(Spain) Roldán Rodríguez	**1**	6	3	C	6	23	Ret	17	4	12	2	Ret	2nd	59
2008–09	GP2/05; Renault; **B**	(Brazil) Diego Nunes	12	Ret	Ret	C	13	22	11	12	1	4	1	6	2nd	59
2009–10	GP2/05; Renault; **B**		YMC1; FEA	YMC1; SPR	YMC2; FEA	YMC2; SPR	BHR1; FEA	BHR1; SPR	BHR2; FEA	BHR2; SPR					13th	0
2009–10	GP2/05; Renault; **B**	(Bulgaria) Vladimir Arabadzhiev	Ret	Ret											13th	0
2009–10	GP2/05; Renault; **B**	(Italy) Daniel Zampieri	15	Ret											13th	0

=== Euroseries 3000 ===
Euro Series 3000
Year	Car	Drivers	Wins	Poles	Fast laps	Points	D.C.	T.C.
1999	Lola T96/50-Zytek	(Italy) Thomas Biagi	0	1	0	16	4th	6th
2000	Lola T96/50-Zytek	(Italy) Thomas Biagi	0	0	2	15	5th	6th
2000	Lola T96/50-Zytek	(Switzerland) Gabriele Gardel	0	0	0	0	24th	6th
2001	Lola T96/50-Zytek	(Italy) Thomas Biagi	1	2	0	32	**2nd**	**2nd**
2001	Lola T96/50-Zytek	(Switzerland) Gabriele Gardel	0	0	1	5	9th	**2nd**
2002	Lola B99/50-Zytek	(Italy) Alessandro Piccolo	1	2	2	28	4th	4th
2002	Lola B99/50-Zytek	(Argentina) Martin Basso	0	0	1	10	8th	4th
2002	Lola B99/50-Zytek	(Italy) Giovanni Montanari	0	0	0	1	14th	4th
2003	Lola B99/50-Zytek	(Russia) Roman Rusinov	0	1	0	6	9th	**3rd**
2003	Lola B99/50-Zytek	(Belgium) Maxime Hodencq	0	0	0	0	24th	**3rd**
2003	Lola B99/50-Zytek	(Italy) Fabrizio Del Monte	1	0	1	31	**2nd**	**3rd**
2004	Lola B99/50-Zytek	(Italy) Fabrizio Del Monte	3	1	1	45	**2nd**	**3rd**
2004	Lola B99/50-Zytek	(Belgium) Maxime Hodencq	0	0	0	3	11th	**3rd**
2004	Lola B99/50-Zytek	(Thailand) Tor Graves	0	0	0	0	16th	**3rd**
2005	Lola B02/50-Zytek	(Italy) Fabrizio Del Monte	0	0	0	15	8th	**3rd**
2005	Lola B02/50-Zytek	(United Kingdom) Alex Lloyd	0	0	0	5	16th	**3rd**
2005	Lola B02/50-Zytek	(Finland) Toni Vilander	1	1	1	23	4th	**3rd**
2005	Lola B02/50-Zytek	(Uruguay) Juan Caceras	0	0	0	20	5th	**3rd**
2006	Lola B02/50-Zytek	(Brazil) Christiano Rocha	1	0	0	51	4th	**2nd**
2006	Lola B02/50-Zytek	(Spain) Roldán Rodríguez	1	2	2	36	6th	**2nd**
2006	Lola B02/50-Zytek	(Brazil) Diego Nunes	0	0	0	6	15th	**2nd**
2006	Lola B02/50-Zytek	(Uruguay) Juan Caceras	0	2	0	28	7th	**2nd**
2006	Lola B02/50-Zytek	(Italy) Davide Rigon	0	0	0	8	14th	**2nd**
2006	Lola B02/50-Zytek	(Italy) Fausto Ippoliti	1	0	0	15	12th	**2nd**
2007	Lola B02/50-Zytek	(Italy) Davide Rigon	5	4	6	108	**1st**	**1st**
2007	Lola B02/50-Zytek	(Brazil) Diego Nunes	4	1	1	77	**2nd**	**1st**
2008	Lola B02/50-Zytek	(Spain) Roldán Rodríguez	2	0	0	26	8th	**2nd**
2008	Lola B02/50-Zytek	(Venezuela) Pastor Maldonado	1	0	1	11	12th	**2nd**
2008	Lola B02/50-Zytek	(Italy) Fabrizio Crestani	3	0	2	49	5th	**2nd**
2008	Lola B02/50-Zytek	(Italy) Fabio Onidi	2	0	6	58	**2nd**	**2nd**

== See also ==
- Rapax Team

Achievements
Preceded by FMS International	Euroseries 3000 Teams' Champion; 2007	Succeeded by Bull Racing
