= 2001 Euro Formula 3000 Championship =

The 2001 Euro Formula 3000 Championship was contested over 8 rounds. 11 different teams, 30 different drivers competed. All teams raced with Lola T96/50 chassis with Zytek engines. Future Formula One driver Felipe Massa took the title.

The scoring system was 10-6-4-3-2-1 points awarded to the first six finishers.

== Entries ==
Team	No.	Driver	Rounds
(Italy) ADM Motorsport	1	(Brazil) Vítor Meira	All
(Italy) ADM Motorsport	2	(Italy) "Babalus"	1-3
(Italy) ADM Motorsport	2	(Switzerland) Gabriele Varano	4-6
(Italy) ADM Motorsport	2	(Russia) Sergey Zlobin	8
(Italy) Sighinolfi Autoracing	5	(Italy) Salvatore Tavano	All
(Italy) Sighinolfi Autoracing	6	(Italy) Alessandro Piccolo	All
(Italy) GP Racing	9	(Italy) Thomas Biagi	All
(Italy) GP Racing	10	(Switzerland) Gabriele Gardel	All
(Italy) Great Wall Racing Team	11	(Italy) Massimiliano Busnelli	All
(Italy) Great Wall Racing Team	12	(Italy) Valerio Scassellati	All
(Italy) Martello Racing	14	(South Africa) Etienne van der Linde	1-6
(Italy) Martello Racing	14	(South Africa) Tomas Scheckter	8
(Italy) Martello Racing	15	(France) Jean de Pourtales	1-7
(Italy) Durango	16	(Italy) Michele Spoldi	1-7
(Italy) Durango	16	(Italy) Gabriele de Bono	8
(Italy) Durango	17	(Italy) Marco Cioci	All
(Italy) Draco Junior Team	18	(Italy) Luca Vacis	All
(Italy) Draco Junior Team	19	(Brazil) Felipe Massa	All
(Italy) Team Ghinzani	20	(Germany) Alexander Müller	All
(Italy) Team Ghinzani	21	(Italy) Armin Pörnbacher	All
(United Kingdom) Fortec Motorsport	24	(Spain) Polo Villaamil	1-5
(United Kingdom) Fortec Motorsport	24	(Japan) Tsuyoshi Takahashi	6
(United Kingdom) Fortec Motorsport	25	(United Kingdom) Michael Bentwood	All
(Italy) Uboldi Corse	26	(Italy) Davide Uboldi	1-3, 6
(Italy) Uboldi Corse	26	(France) Yannick Schroeder	4-5
(Italy) Uboldi Corse	26	(Italy) Michele Spoldi	8
(Italy) Uboldi Corse	27	(Brazil) Leonardo Nienkötter	All
(Italy) B&C Competition	28	(Germany) Sascha Bert	1-2
(Italy) B&C Competition	28	(Italy) Giuseppe Burlotti	3
(Italy) B&C Competition	28	(Italy) Giovanni Montanari	4-8
(Italy) B&C Competition	29	(France) Romain Dumas	1-5
(Italy) B&C Competition	29	(France) Yannick Schroeder	6-7

== Calendar ==
Round	Circuit/Location	Date	Laps	Distance	Time	Speed
1	(Italy) ACI Vallelunga Circuit	22 April	44	3.228=142.032 km	0'49:05.454	173.595 km/h
2	(Italy) Autodromo di Pergusa	6 May	25	4.950=143.55 km	0'45:25.500	189.609 km/h
3	(Italy) Autodromo Nazionale Monza	24 June	25	5.793=144.825 km	0'44:18.209	196.136 km/h
4	(United Kingdom) Donington Park	12 August	36	4.023=144.828 km	0'52:49.068	164.522 km/h
5	(Belgium) Circuit Zolder	19 August	35	4.194=146.79 km	0'50:33.479	174.204 km/h
6	(Italy) Autodromo Enzo e Dino Ferrari, Imola	26 August	29	4.933=143.057 km	0'50:04.560	171.408 km/h
7	(Germany) Nürburgring	16 September	31	4.556=141.236 km	0'52:04.674	162.721 km/h
8	(Spain) Circuit de Valencia	7 October	35	4.051=141.785 km	0'51:27.597	165.315 km/h

== Calendar ==
Round	Circuit/Location	Pole position	Fastest lap	Winner	Winning team
1	(Italy) ACI Vallelunga Circuit	(Brazil) Felipe Massa	(Brazil) Felipe Massa	(Brazil) Felipe Massa	(Italy) Draco Junior Team
2	(Italy) Autodromo di Pergusa	(Brazil) Felipe Massa	(Italy) Alessandro Piccolo	(Brazil) Felipe Massa	(Italy) Draco Junior Team
3	(Italy) Autodromo Nazionale Monza	(Italy) Thomas Biagi	(Brazil) Felipe Massa	(Brazil) Felipe Massa	(Italy) Draco Junior Team
4	(United Kingdom) Donington Park	(Italy) Thomas Biagi	(Germany) Alexander Müller	(Italy) Thomas Biagi	(Italy) GP Racing
5	(Belgium) Circuit Zolder	(Brazil) Felipe Massa	(Italy) Thomas Biagi	(Italy) Salvatore Tavano	(Italy) Sighinolfi Autoracing
6	(Italy) Autodromo Enzo e Dino Ferrari, Imola	(Brazil) Felipe Massa	(Brazil) Felipe Massa	(Brazil) Felipe Massa	(Italy) Draco Junior Team
7	(Germany) Nürburgring	(Brazil) Felipe Massa	(Brazil) Felipe Massa	(Brazil) Felipe Massa	(Italy) Draco Junior Team
8	(Spain) Circuit de Valencia	(Brazil) Felipe Massa	(Brazil) Felipe Massa	(Brazil) Felipe Massa	(Italy) Draco Junior Team

== Championships standings ==
Pos	Driver	VLL (Italy)	PER (Italy)	MNZ (Italy)	DON (United Kingdom)	ZOL (Belgium)	IMO (Italy)	NÜR (Germany)	VAL (Spain)	Pts
1	(Brazil) Felipe Massa	1	1	1	8	Ret	1	1	1	60
2	(Italy) Thomas Biagi	2	3	Ret	1	4	2	Ret	4	32
3	(Germany) Alexander Müller	9	4	2	4	3	3	2	12	26
4	(Italy) Salvatore Tavano	5	5	7	2	1	DNS	Ret	Ret	20
5	(Brazil) Vítor Meira	Ret	Ret	DNS	Ret	2	5	3	3	16
6	(Italy) Alessandro Piccolo	3	2	Ret	Ret	5	14	4	Ret	15
7	(France) Romain Dumas	6	Ret	3	5	14			2	13
8	(Spain) Polo Villaamil	4	14	4	Ret	15			Ret	6
9	(Switzerland) Gabriele Gardel	13	Ret	5	Ret	7	6	Ret	5	5
10	(South Africa) Etienne van der Linde	11	Ret	8	3	9	Ret			4
11	(Italy) Massimiliano Busnelli	Ret	7	Ret	Ret	6	4	Ret	14	4
12	(United Kingdom) Michael Bentwood	Ret	6	11	Ret	10	12	5	7	3
13	(Italy) Luca Vacis	Ret	11	6	Ret	12	15	8	8	1
14	(Italy) Giovanni Montanari				6	Ret	Ret	Ret	Ret	1
15	(France) Yannick Schroeder				Ret	8	9	6		1
16	(Italy) Marco Cioci	8	8	Ret	7	Ret	Ret	Ret	6	1
-	(Brazil) Leonardo Nienkotter	12	Ret	Ret	Ret	11	7	7	9	0
-	(Italy) "Babalus"	7	9	9						0
-	(Italy) Valerio Scassellati	18†	13	10	9	13	8	9	10	0
-	(Italy) Armin Pornbacher	10	15	Ret	10	Ret	Ret	Ret	11	0
-	(Italy) Michele Spoldi	16	10	Ret	Ret	Ret	10	11	Ret	0
-	(France) Jean de Pourtales	15	Ret	Ret	Ret	Ret	11	10		0
-	(Italy) Davide Uboldi	17†	12	Ret			Ret			0
-	(Japan) Tsuyoshi Takahashi						13			0
-	(Russia) Sergey Zlobin								13	0
-	(Switzerland) Gabriele Varano				Ret	16	Ret			0
-	(Germany) Sascha Bert	14	Ret							0
-	(Italy) Giuseppe Burlotti			Ret						0
-	(South Africa) Tomas Scheckter								Ret	0
-	(Italy) Gabriele de Bono								Ret	0
Pos	Driver	VLL (Italy)	PER (Italy)	MNZ (Italy)	DON (United Kingdom)	ZOL (Belgium)	IMO (Italy)	NÜR (Germany)	VAL (Spain)	Pts

Colour	Result
Gold	Winner
Silver	Second place
Bronze	Third place
Green	Points classification
Blue	Non-points classification
Blue	Non-classified finish (NC)
Purple	Retired, not classified (Ret)
Red	Did not qualify (DNQ)
Red	Did not pre-qualify (DNPQ)
Black	Disqualified (DSQ)
White	Did not start (DNS)
White	Withdrew (WD)
White	Race cancelled (C)
Blank	Did not practice (DNP)
Blank	Did not arrive (DNA)
Blank	Excluded (EX)

- † — Drivers did not finish the race, but were classified as they completed over 90% of the race distance.

== See also ==
2001 International Formula 3000 season
