= Valerio Scassellati =

Italian racing driver (born 1979)

Valerio Scassellati (born 24 July 1979 in Gualdo Tadino) is an Italian racing driver.

== Career ==
=== Euro F3000 ===
Scassellati competed in the Euro Formula 3000 championship in both 2001 and 2002, starting fourteen races and scoring one point overall.

=== Formula 3000 ===
Scassellati graduated to the more prestigious International Formula 3000 series for 2003, where he contested selected events for the newly created BCN Competicion team throughout the season. It was a chaotic season for the team, with seven drivers sharing the two cars (Scassellati, Rob Nguyen, Alessandro Piccolo, Will Langhorne, Marc Hynes, Giovanni Berton and Ferdinando Monfardini). He scored no points, with a best finish of thirteenth at the season-opener.

== Racing record ==
=== Complete International Formula 3000 results ===
(key) (Races in bold indicate pole position; races in italics indicate fastest lap.)

Year	Entrant	1	2	3	4	5	6	7	8	9	10	DC	Points
2003	BCN F3000	IMO; 13	CAT	A1R	MON	NUR; 15	MAG; 15	SIL	HOC; 14	HUN	MNZ	NC	0
