= Team JVA =

(United Kingdom) Team JVA
- Founded: 1980
- Team principal(s): John Village
- Current series: A1 Grand Prix; Formula Master
- Former series: Formula Ford; Formula Vauxhall Lotus; Italian Formula 3000
- Drivers' Championships: 1991 Formula Vauxhall Lotus (Burt); 1996 Formula Vauxhall Junior (Mullen)

Team John Village Automotive (Team JVA) is a British motor racing team founded by the former Formula Ford champion John Village in 1980 and headquartered in Chesterfield, England.

== History ==
The team was founded as a garage and race preparation business. In the 1980s JVA ran in Formula Ford, winning the Spanish championship with Victor López Ferraz and at international level, by winning the Formula Ford Festival with Vincenzo Sospiri in 1988.

In the 1990s, the team entered Formula Vauxhall Lotus. Kelvin Burt won the 1991 championship and Oliver Gavin was runner-up in 1992. JVA ran also in Formula Vauxhall Junior and won the championship in 1996 with Tim Mullen.

Team JVA have been involved in Italian Formula 3000/Euro Formula 3000 since 1999, at first in collaboration with Edenbridge Racing, Arden Team Russia, B&C Competition, and on its own since 2002. In 2005, it ran in the rival Pro Series (predecessor to the current International Formula Master).

Since 2005–06, the team has worked with A1 Team Canada in A1 Grand Prix.

== Series results ==
A1 Grand Prix results
| Year | Car | Team | Races | Wins | Poles | Fast laps | Points | T.C. |
|---|---|---|---|---|---|---|---|---|
| 2005–06 | Lola A1GP-Zytek | A1 Team Canada | 22 | 1 | 0 | 0 | 59 | 11th |
| 2006–07 | Lola A1GP-Zytek | A1 Team Canada | 22 | 0 | 0 | 1 | 33 | 11th |
| 2007–08 | Lola A1GP-Zytek | A1 Team Canada | 20 | 1 | 2 | 1 | 75 | 9th |

Italian Formula 3000/Euro Formula 3000 and International Formula Master results
| Year | Car | Drivers | Races | Wins | Poles | Fast laps | Points | D.C. | T.C. |
|---|---|---|---|---|---|---|---|---|---|
| 2002 | Lola B99/50-Zytek | (France) Romain Dumas | 9 | 3 | 1 | 1 | 42 | 2nd | 3rd |
| 2002 | Lola B99/50-Zytek | (United States) Peter Boss | 9 | 0 | 0 | 0 | 0 | NC | 3rd |
| 2003 | Lola B99/50-Zytek | (United States) Peter Boss | 9 | 0 | 0 | 0 | 12 | 7th | 6th |
| 2003 | Lola B99/50-Zytek | (United States) Joel Nelson | 9 | 0 | 1 | 0 | 12 | 7th | 6th |
| 2004 | Lola B99/50-Zytek | (New Zealand) Jonny Reid | 10 | 1 | 0 | 0 | 25 | 4th | 2nd |
| 2004 | Lola B99/50-Zytek | (United Kingdom) Alex Lloyd | 6 | 1 | 2 | 1 | 19 | 6th | 2nd |
| 2004 | Lola B99/50-Zytek | (Czech Republic) Tomáš Kostka | 1 | 0 | 0 | 0 | 0 | NC | 2nd |
| 2005 | Lola B99/50-Zytek | (Thailand) Tor Graves | 8 | 0 | 0 | 0 | 23 | 5th | 4th |
| 2005 | Lola B99/50-Zytek | (United Kingdom) Dominik Jackson | 2 | 0 | 0 | 0 | 11 | 10th | 4th |
| 2005 | Lola B99/50-Zytek | (United Kingdom) Robbie Kerr | 1 | 1 | 1 | 0 | 10 | 11th | 4th |
| 2005 | Lola B99/50-Zytek | (United Kingdom) Scott Mansell | 1 | 0 | 0 | 0 | 3 | 14th | 4th |
| 2007 | Tatuus FM07-Honda | (Thailand) Tor Graves | 12 | 0 | 0 | 0 | 1 | 29th | 13th |
| 2007 | Tatuus FM07-Honda | (United Kingdom) Jon Barnes | 2 | 0 | 0 | 0 | 0 | NC | 13th |

- D.C. = Drivers' Championship position, T.C. = Teams' Championship position.
