= 2002 Euro Formula 3000 Championship =

The 2002 Euro Formula 3000 Championship was scheduled over 10 rounds and contested over 9 rounds. 14 different teams, 35 different drivers competed. All teams raced with Lola B99/50-Zytek chassis/engine combination.

The scoring system was 10-6-4-3-2-1 points awarded to the first six finishers.

== Entries ==
Team	No.	Driver	Rounds
(Italy) Draco Junior Team	1	(Brazil) Augusto Farfus	All
(Italy) Draco Junior Team	2	(Italy) Matteo Grassotto	All
(Italy) GP Racing	3	(Argentina) Martin Basso	All
(Italy) GP Racing	4	(Italy) Alessandro Piccolo	1-9
(Italy) GP Racing	4	(San Marino) Christian Montanari	10
(Italy) Sighinolfi Autoracing	5	(Italy) Valerio Scassellati	1-3
(Italy) Sighinolfi Autoracing	5	(Italy) Gabriele Lancieri	4
(Italy) Sighinolfi Autoracing	6	(Italy) Gabriele Lancieri	1
(Italy) Sighinolfi Autoracing	6	(France) Jean de Pourtales	2-4
(Italy) Team Ghinzani	7	(Italy) Thomas Biagi	All
(Italy) Team Ghinzani	8	(Italy) Fabrizio del Monte	1-6, 8-10
(Italy) ADM Motorsport	9	(Brazil) Vítor Meira	1-4
(Italy) ADM Motorsport	9	(Brazil) Leonardo Nienkötter	5
(Italy) ADM Motorsport	9	(Italy) Gianmaria Bruni	6
(Italy) ADM Motorsport	10	(Italy) Armin Pörnbacher	1-9
(Italy) B&C Competition	11	(Russia) Sergey Zlobin	1-2, 6-10
(Italy) B&C Competition	11	(Brazil) Leonardo Nienkötter	3-4
(Italy) B&C Competition	11	(Italy) "Babalus"	5
(Italy) B&C Competition	12	(Italy) "Babalus"	1-3
(Italy) B&C Competition	12	(Italy) Raffaele Giammaria	4
(Italy) B&C Competition	12	(Italy) Massimo Carli	5-6
(Italy) B&C Competition	12	(Italy) Gabriele Lancieri	7-10
(Italy) Euronova Racing	14	(Italy) Alessandro Piccolo	10
(Italy) Euronova Racing	15	(United Kingdom) Michael Bentwood	10
(Italy) Great Wall Racing Team	16	(Estonia) Tom Nemarnik	1-2, 7
(Italy) Great Wall Racing Team	16	(Italy) Massimiliano Busnelli	3-6, 8
(Italy) Great Wall Racing Team	16	(Italy) Valerio Scassellati	9-10
(Italy) Great Wall Racing Team	17	(Brazil) Jaime Melo	All
(Italy) Uboldi Corse	18	(Switzerland) Gabriele Gardel	All
(Italy) Uboldi Corse	19	(France) Yannick Schroeder	1-5
(Italy) Uboldi Corse	19	(Italy) Ivan Bellarosa	7-10
(Italy) Victory Engineering	20	(Italy) Marco Cioci	All
(Italy) Victory Engineering	21	(France) Julien Vidot	1-7
(Italy) Victory Engineering	21	(Italy) Matteo Pellegrino	9-10
(Italy) Scuderia Famà	22	(Switzerland) Joel Camathias	1-5
(Italy) Scuderia Famà	22	(France) Jean de Pourtales	6, 9-10
(Italy) Scuderia Famà	22	(Italy) Stefano Mocellini	8
(Italy) Scuderia Famà	23	(Poland) Jaroslaw Wierczuk	1-3
(Italy) Scuderia Famà	23	(Italy) Valerio Scassellati	4, 6
(Czech Republic) ISR Racing	24	(Czech Republic) Jaroslav Janis	All
(Czech Republic) ISR Racing	25	(Brazil) Juliano Moro	1-5
(Czech Republic) ISR Racing	25	(France) Yannick Schroeder	6-10
(Italy) Scuderia Coloni	26	(Italy) Gianmaria Bruni	1-3
(Italy) Scuderia Coloni	27	(Italy) Raffaele Giammaria	1-3
(United Kingdom) John Village Automotive	28	(United States) Peter Boss	All
(United Kingdom) John Village Automotive	29	(France) Romain Dumas	All

== Race calendar ==
Round	Circuit/Location	Date	Laps	Distance	Time	Speed
1	(Italy) ACI Vallelunga Circuit	21 April	35	3.222=112.77 km	0'39:11.108	172.997 km/h
2	(Germany) Nürburgring	5 May	cancelled due to snow			
3	(Italy) Autodromo di Pergusa	19 May	31	4.950=153.45 km	0'48:06.418	191.381 km/h
4	(Italy) Autodromo Nazionale Monza	30 June	26	5.770=150.02 km	0'46:09.757	195.766 km/h
5	(Belgium) Spa-Francorchamps	28 July	20	6.968=139.36 km	0'43:53.501	190.505 km/h
6	(United Kingdom) Donington Park	11 August	38	4.023=152.874 km	0'55:00.327	166.755 km/h
7	(Czech Republic) Masaryk Circuit, Brno	8 September	27	5.403=145.881 km	0'50:22.768	173.739 km/h
8	(France) Dijon-Prenois	22 September	38	3.8=144.4 km	0'45:24.906	190.774 km/h
9	(Spain) Circuito Permanente de Jerez	13 October	34	4.428=150.552 km	0'57:53.578	155.856 km/h
10	(Italy) Circuito di Cagliari	10 November	62	2.414=149.668 km	1'13:13.349	122.641 km/h

Note:

Race 1 originally scheduled over 47 laps but stopped early due to rain.

The race in Cagliari was originally scheduled for 10 October.

== Results ==
Round	Circuit	Pole position	Fastest lap	Winner	Winning team
1	(Italy) ACI Vallelunga Circuit	(Italy) Alessandro Piccolo	(Argentina) Martín Basso	(France) Romain Dumas	(United Kingdom) John Village Automotive
	(Germany) Nürburgring	cancelled due to snow			
2	(Italy) Autodromo di Pergusa	(Italy) Alessandro Piccolo	(Italy) Alessandro Piccolo	(Italy) Alessandro Piccolo	(Italy) GP Racing
3	(Italy) Autodromo Nazionale Monza	(Italy) Thomas Biagi	(France) Romain Dumas	(France) Romain Dumas	(United Kingdom) John Village Automotive
4	(Belgium) Spa-Francorchamps	(Czech Republic) Jaroslav Janiš	(Czech Republic) Jaroslav Janiš	(France) Romain Dumas	(United Kingdom) John Village Automotive
5	(United Kingdom) Donington Park	(Czech Republic) Jaroslav Janiš	(Czech Republic) Jaroslav Janiš	(Czech Republic) Jaroslav Janiš	(Czech Republic) ISR Racing
6	(Czech Republic) Masaryk Circuit, Brno	(France) Romain Dumas	(Brazil) Jaime Melo	(Brazil) Jaime Melo	(Italy) Great Wall Racing Team
7	(France) Dijon-Prenois	(Brazil) Jaime Melo	(Italy) Alessandro Piccolo	(Brazil) Jaime Melo	(Italy) Great Wall Racing Team
8	(Spain) Circuito Permanente de Jerez	(Brazil) Jaime Melo	(Brazil) Jaime Melo	(Brazil) Jaime Melo	(Italy) Great Wall Racing Team
9	(Italy) Circuito di Cagliari	(Czech Republic) Jaroslav Janiš	(Czech Republic) Jaroslav Janiš	(Czech Republic) Jaroslav Janiš	(Czech Republic) ISR Racing

Note:

Race 1 originally scheduled over 47 laps but stopped early due to rain.

The race in Cagliari was originally scheduled for 10 October.

== Championships standings ==
Pos	Driver	VLL (Italy)	NÜR (Germany)	PER (Italy)	MNZ (Italy)	DON (United Kingdom)	SPA (Belgium)	BRN (Czech Republic)	DIJ (France)	JER (Spain)	CAG (Italy)	Pts
1	(Brazil) Jaime Melo	11	C	4	9	2	3	1	1	1	2	49
2	(France) Romain Dumas	1	C	Ret	1	1	10	2	6	4	5	42
3	(Czech Republic) Jaroslav Janis	Ret	C	2	6	Ret	1	5	4	3	1	36
4	(Italy) Alessandro Piccolo	4	C	1	2	Ret	11	10	2	Ret	4	28
5	(Italy) Thomas Biagi	3	C	6	3	13	5	3	10	Ret	Ret	15
6	(France) Yannick Schroeder	9	C	Ret	Ret	6	2	6	9	2	Ret	14
7	(Italy) Matteo Grassotto	5	C	Ret	7	Ret	7	Ret	3	5	3	12
8	(Argentina) Martin Basso	2	C	7	8	5	14	15	5	Ret	7	10
9	(Brazil) Augusto Farfus	Ret	C	Ret	Ret	3	6	4	7	Ret	13	8
10	(Italy) Massimiliano Busnelli			5	5	4	8		8			7
11	(France) Julien Vidot	12	C	Ret	4	Ret	4	7				6
12	(Italy) Gianmaria Bruni	6	C	3			9					5
13	(Italy) Valerio Scassellati	20	C	9	14		Ret			6	14	1
14	(San Marino) Christian Montanari										6	1
-	(United States) Peter Boss	Ret	C	Ret	11	12	Ret	11	15	7	11	0
-	(Brazil) Vítor Meira	7	C	11	Ret							0
-	(Italy) "Babalus"	DNS	C	Ret		7						0
-	(Italy) Fabrizio del Monte	13	C	Ret	12	9	13		13	8	10	0
-	(Switzerland) Gabriele Gardel	Ret	C	8	Ret	Ret	12	16	12	Ret	9	0
-	(Italy) Armin Pornbacher	16	C	Ret	Ret	10	Ret	8	11	Ret		0
-	(Italy) Raffaele Giammaria	8	C	12	Ret							0
-	(Brazil) Leonardo Nienkotter			Ret	DNS	8						0
-	(United Kingdom) Michael Bentwood										8	0
-	(Italy) Marco Cioci	10	C	Ret	Ret	Ret	15	12	16	9	12	0
-	(Italy) Gabriele Lancieri	14			Ret			9	DNS	Ret	Ret	0
-	(Russia) Sergey Zlobin	Ret	C				16	14	18	10	17	0
-	(Switzerland) Joel Camathias	17	C	Ret	10	DNQ						0
-	(Poland) Jaroslaw Wierczuk	19	C	10								0
-	(Brazil) Juliano Moro	15	C	Ret	Ret	11						0
-	(France) Jean de Pourtales		C	Ret	13		17			Ret	16	0
-	(Estonia) Tom Nemarnik	18	C					13				0
-	(Italy) Ivan Bellarosa							Ret	14	Ret	15	0
-	(Italy) Stefano Mocellini								17			0
-	(Italy) Matteo Pellegrino									Ret	Ret	0
-	(Italy) Massimo Carli					Ret	Ret					0
Pos	Driver	VLL (Italy)	NÜR (Germany)	PER (Italy)	MNZ (Italy)	DON (United Kingdom)	SPA (Belgium)	BRN (Czech Republic)	DIJ (France)	JER (Spain)	CAG (Italy)	Pts

Colour	Result
Gold	Winner
Silver	Second place
Bronze	Third place
Green	Points classification
Blue	Non-points classification
Blue	Non-classified finish (NC)
Purple	Retired, not classified (Ret)
Red	Did not qualify (DNQ)
Red	Did not pre-qualify (DNPQ)
Black	Disqualified (DSQ)
White	Did not start (DNS)
White	Withdrew (WD)
White	Race cancelled (C)
Blank	Did not practice (DNP)
Blank	Did not arrive (DNA)
Blank	Excluded (EX)
