= Marco Cioci =

Italian racing driver (born 1975)

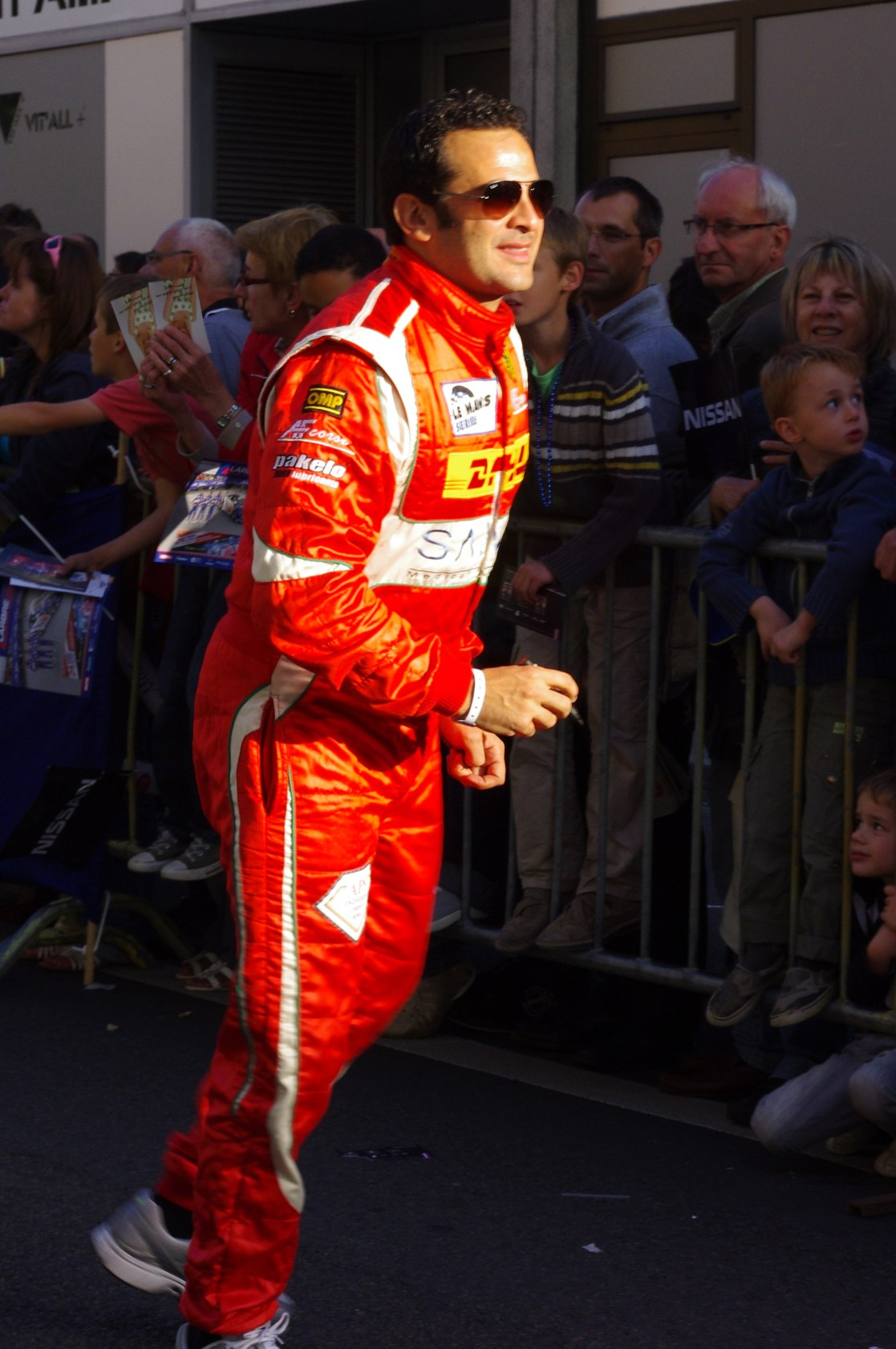
- Cioci in 2011
- Nationality: (Italy) Italian
- Born: 26 September 1975 (age 51) Rome, Italy
- Categorisation: FIA Gold

Championship titles
- 2008: International GT Open - GTS

Marco Cioci (born 26 September 1975 in Rome) is an Italian racing driver. A long-term Ferrari factory driver, he found success predominantly in the LMGTE Am class, but famously won the inaugural FIA WEC race, the 2012 12 Hours of Sebring, in LMGTE Pro. He is also the most decorated driver at the 6 Hours of Vallelunga with six overall wins.

In 2021, together with Giancarlo Fisichella, Cioci founded Top Gun by Pro Racing, a racing school aiming to help young karting drivers on their step up to cars.

== Career ==
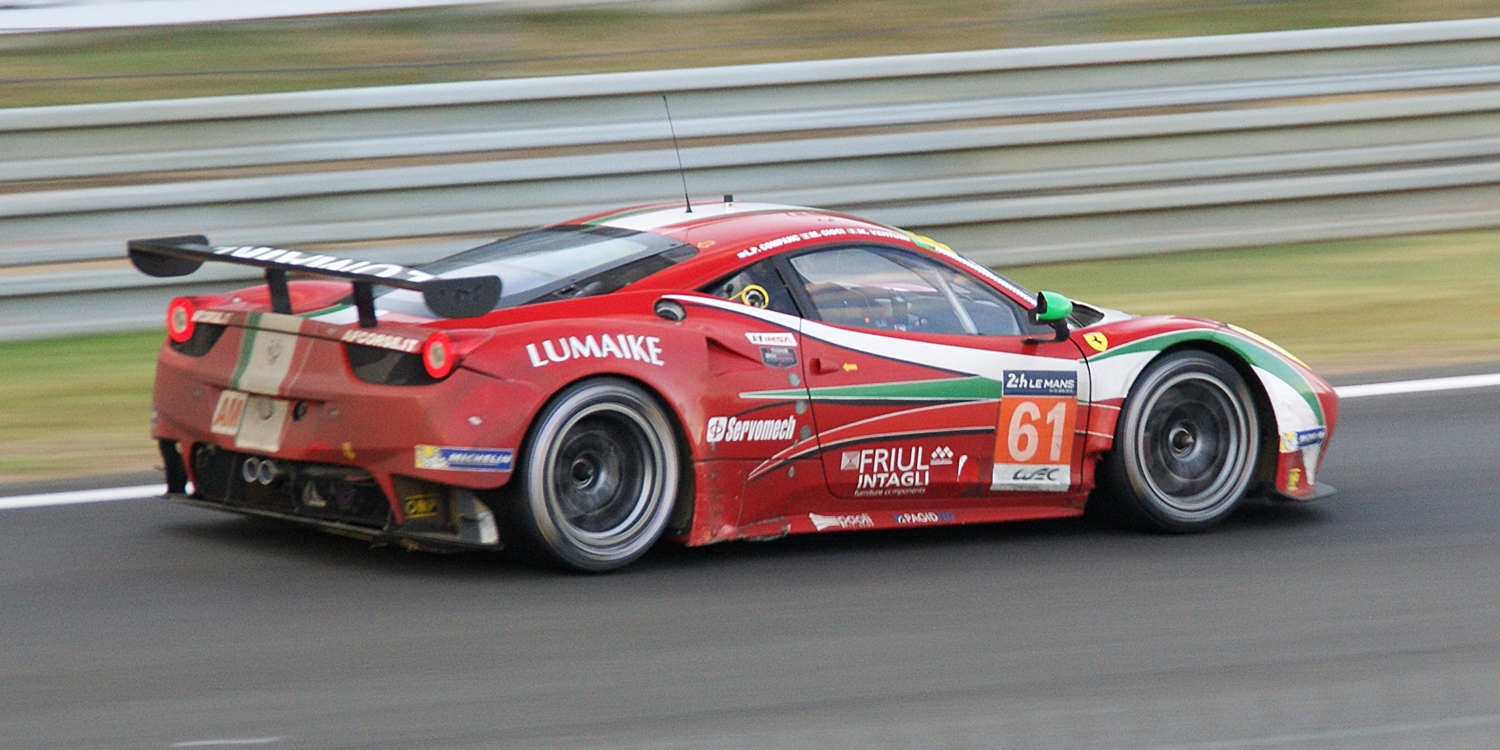
Cioci's AF Corse Ferrari at the 2014 24 Hours of Le Mans

Cioci began his racing career in 1995, racing sporadically in junior formulae until 2003, making appearances in Formula Palmer Audi, Euro Formula 3000 and Infiniti Pro Series. Having made his sportscar debut in 2004 for Megadrive in the Italian GT Championship, Cioci then raced part-time in the 2005 FIA GT Championship for GPC Sport, as well as finishing third in the Mil Milhas Brasil the same year for Racing Box. Cioci then won the 1000 km of Nürburgring in GT2 and the 6 Hours of Vallelunga overall the following year, before scoring a lone podium at the 1000 km of Valencia in 2007 in his maiden full-time campaign in the Le Mans Series. Cioci then won the International GT Open GTS title in 2008, before scoring five wins in Italian GT the following year to secure runner-up honors in GT2.

Joining AF Corse for 2010, another race winning campaign in Italian GT ensued in which he won twice and ended the year fifth in the GT2 standings, a year in which he also finished third in the GT2 class of the 24 Hours of Spa for the same team. Remaining with AF Corse the following year, Cioci embarked on his maiden campaign in the Le Mans Series' LMGTE Am class, taking three podiums and ending the year runner-up in points. During 2011, Cioci also raced with the team at the 24 Hours of Le Mans, as well as taking his second overall win at the 6 Hours of Vallelunga. Primarily racing in the Blancpain Endurance Series and the European Le Mans Series in 2012, Cioci found more success in the latter, scoring two podiums and finishing runner-up in the LMGTE Am class. During 2012, Cioci also made select starts in the FIA World Endurance Championship for the same team, winning the 12 Hours of Sebring in LMGTE Pro and the 6 Hours of Silverstone in LMGTE Am.

Cioci remained with AF Corse for 2013, as he competed full-time in both the FIA World Endurance Championship and the European Le Mans Series. In the former, Cioci finished third at the 24 Hours of Le Mans, helping him end the year 12th in LMGTE Am, whereas in the latter, Cioci scored podiums at Imola and the Hungaroring en route to a fourth-place points finish in LMGTE. During 2013, Cioci also won the 6 Hours of Vallelunga, as well as finishing second at the Gulf 12 Hours, which he won its first segment, and the Dubai 24 Hour. Remaining with AF Corse for 2014, Cioci raced full-time in the European Le Mans Series, whilst also competing in select rounds of the FIA World Endurance Championship. In ELMS, Cioci scored a lone podium at Estoril to secure sixth in the LMGTE standings, whereas in the latter, Cioci won the 6 Hours of Spa-Francorchamps and finished third at the 24 Hours of Le Mans to end the year sixth in LMGTE Am. During 2014, Cioci also won the 6 Hours of Vallelunga overall and the 24 Hours of Spa in Pro-Am for the same team, as well as racing in select rounds of the United SportsCar Championship for Spirit of Race in GTD.

In 2015, Cioci stayed with AF Corse for a dual campaign in the Blancpain Endurance Series and the GTC class of the European Le Mans Series. Finishing 23rd in the Pro-Am standings of the former, Cioci found more success in ELMS, scoring a lone win at Estoril and a podium at Imola en route to a fourth-place points finish. Continuing with AF Corse for 2016, Cioci stayed in ELMS, scoring a second-place finish at the Red Bull Ring as he ended the year eighth in the LMGTE points, as well as racing in select rounds of International GT Open in the Pro-Am class. At the end of the year, Cioci competed in the 2016–17 Asian Le Mans Series for Spirit of Race in the GT class, winning at Zhuhai to end the season seventh in points. The following year, Cioci raced for Kaspersky Motorsport in the Blancpain GT Series Endurance Cup and for AF Corse in International GT Open. In the former, Cioci scored a best result of fourth at Monza and picked up further points at the 24 Hours of Spa by leading the six hour mark and being third at the halfway mark. Racing in Pro-Am in GT Open meanwhile, Cioci took a lone class win at Spa and took three further podiums to end the season fourth in Pro-Am. During 2017, Cioci also finished second at the 24 Hours of Le Mans and scored his sixth overall win at the 6 Hours of Vallelunga. At the end of the year, Cioci joined FIST-Team AAI to race in select rounds of the 2017–18 Asian Le Mans Series, winning at Fuji and finishing third at Buriram to take sixth in the GT points.

In 2018, Cioci joined Luzich Racing to race full-time in International GT Open and the GT3 class of the Le Mans Cup for AF Corse. In GT Open, Cioci scored wins at the Hungaroring and Silverstone en route to a ninth-place points finish, whereas in the latter, Cioci won race one at Le Mans and scored three more podiums to end the season fourth in the GT3 points. During 2018, Cioci also made one-off appearances in the Blancpain GT Series Endurance Cup and the 24H Proto Series. The following year, Cioci joined Easy Race to compete in the Italian GT Endurance Championship, scoring a lone podium at Monza to secure fifth in the GT3 standings. In 2020, Cioci made a one-off appearance in the Italian GT Endurance Championship at Vallelunga.

== Racing record ==
=== Racing career summary ===
Season	Series	Team	Races	Wins	Poles	F/Laps	Podiums	Points	Position
1995	EFDA Nations Cup	Team Italy	1	0	0	0	0	—N/a	5th
1996	Renault Clio Cup Italy		??	??	??	??	??	??	**3rd**
2000	Formula Palmer Audi	MotorSport Vision	20	0	0	0	0	161	14th
2000	Italian Formula 3000 Championship	Traini Corse	1	0	0	0	0	0	NC
2001	Euro Formula 3000 Championship	Durango	8	0	0	0	0	1	16th
2001	6 Hours of Vallelunga – SR1	Durango	1	1	0	1	1	—N/a	**1st**
2002	Euro Formula 3000 Championship	Victory Engineering	9	0	0	0	0	0	NC
2003	Infiniti Pro Series	Sam Schmidt Motorsports	2	0	0	0	0	40	21st
2004	Italian GT Championship	Megadrive	16	0	1	0	6	148	7th
2005	FIA GT Championship - GT1	GPC Sport	2	0	0	0	0	3	32nd
2005	Mil Milhas Brasil	Racing Box	1	0	0	0	1	—N/a	**3rd**
2006	FIA GT Championship - GT2	GPC Sport	1	0	0	0	0	6	20th
2006	Le Mans Series - GT2	GPC Sport	2	1	1	0	1	10	9th
2006	Mil Milhas Brasil - GT1	GPC Sport	1	0	0	0	0	—N/a	9th
2006	FIA GT3 European Championship	Racing Box	10	0	0	0	0	21	9th
2006	6 Hours of Vallelunga	Racing Box	1	1	0	1	1	—N/a	**1st**
2007	Le Mans Series - GT1	Racing Box	5	0	0	0	1	20	7th
2007	International GT Open - GTA	Racing Box	2	0	0	0	0	??	??
2008	International GT Open - GTS	Twentytwo	14	6	7	5	9	71	**1st**
2008	International GT Open - GTA	Advanced Engineering	2	0	0	0	0	3	29th
2008	6 Hours of Vallelunga	Advanced Engineering	1	1	0	1	1	—N/a	**1st**
2008	Italian GT Championship - GT2	Megadrive	??	??	??	??	??	72	10th
2008–09	Speedcar Series	Durango	2	0	0	0	0	0	21st
2009	24H Series - A5	Duller Motorsport 1	1	0	0	0	1	??	??
2009	International GT Open - Super GT	Megadrive	16	0	0	0	3	45	6th
2009	Italian GT Championship - GT2	Megadrive	14	5	5	0	7	131	**2nd**
2010	24H Series - A6	De Lorenzi Racing 1	1	0	0	1	0	??	??
2010	Italian GT Championship - GT2	AF Corse	13	2	1	1	6	110	5th
2010	Superstars GTSprint Series - GT2	AF Corse	2	1	1	0	1	31	10th
2010	Superstars GTSprint Series - GT3	Scuderia 22	2	0	0	0	0	42	5th
2010	24 Hours of Spa - GT2	AF Corse; ALD Team Vitaphone	1	0	1	0	1	—N/a	**3rd**
2010	Le Mans Series - LMP2	Racing Box	3	0	0	0	0	15	15th
2010	24 Hours of Le Mans - LMP2	Racing Box	1	0	0	0	0	—N/a	DNF
2011	Le Mans Series - LMGTE Am	AF Corse	5	0	0	0	3	58	**2nd**
2011	Intercontinental Le Mans Cup - LMGTE Am	AF Corse	5	0	1	0	2	??	??
2011	24 Hours of Le Mans - LMGTE Am	AF Corse	1	0	1	0	0	—N/a	DNF
2011	Italian GT Championship - GT3	AF Corse	4	1	1	0	2	44	9th
2011	Blancpain Endurance Series - GT3 Pro-Am	AF Corse	1	0	0	0	1	19	14th
2011	6 Hours of Vallelunga	AF Corse	1	1	0	0	1	—N/a	**1st**
2011	24 Hours of Dubai - A6	AF Corse	1	0	0	0	1	—N/a	**2nd**
2012	Gulf 12 Hours - GT3	AF Corse	1	1	0	0	1	—N/a	**1st**
2012	FIA World Endurance Championship - LMGTE Pro	AF Corse	2	1	0	0	1	/	/
2012	24 Hours of Le Mans - LMGTE Pro	AF Corse	1	0	0	0	0	—N/a	4th
2012	Blancpain Endurance Series - GT3 Pro-Am	AF Corse	5	0	0	0	0	0	NC
2012	FIA GT1 World Championship	AF Corse	1	0	0	0	0	8	21st
2012	European Le Mans Series - LMGTE Am	AF Corse	3	0	1	0	2	34	**2nd**
2012	Dubai 24 Hour - A6	AF Corse	1	0	0	0	0	—N/a	DNF
2012	FIA World Endurance Championship - LMGTE Am	AF Corse-Waltrip; AF Corse	3	1	0	0	1	/	/
2012	Ferrari Challenge Europe - Trofeo Pirelli	Motor Piacenza	2	1	2	0	1	26	14th
2013	FIA World Endurance Championship - LMGTE Am	AF Corse	7	0	0	0	1	53	12th
2013	24 Hours of Le Mans - LMGTE Am	AF Corse	1	0	0	0	1	—N/a	**3rd**
2013	European Le Mans Series - LMGTE	AF Corse	5	0	0	0	2	63	4th
2013	Bathurst 12 Hour - A	AF Corse	1	0	0	0	0	—N/a	7th
2013	6 Hours of Vallelunga	AF Corse	1	1	0	0	1	—N/a	**1st**
2013	Dubai 24 Hour - A6	AF Corse	1	0	0	0	0	—N/a	**2nd**
2013	Blancpain Endurance Series - Pro-Am	AF Corse	1	0	0	0	0	17	23rd
2013	International GT Open - Super GT	AF Corse	1	0	0	0	0	3	18th
2013	Gulf 12 Hours - GT3	AF Corse	1	0	0	0	1	—N/a	**2nd**
2013	International GTSprint Series	Ferrari Motor Ukraine	2	1	0	0	2	38	25th
2014	United SportsCar Championship - GTD	Spirit of Race	3	0	0	0	0	19	86th
2014	FIA World Endurance Championship - LMGTE Am	AF Corse	4	1	1	0	2	76	6th
2014	24 Hours of Le Mans - LMGTE Am	AF Corse	1	0	0	0	1	—N/a	**3rd**
2014	European Le Mans Series - LMGTE	AF Corse	5	0	0	0	1	48	6th
2014	Bathurst 12 Hour - A	AF Corse	0	0	0	0	0	—N/a	DNS
2014	Blancpain Endurance Series - Pro-Am	AF Corse	1	1	0	0	1	31	9th
2014	6 Hours of Vallelunga	AF Corse	1	1	0	0	1	—N/a	**1st**
2014	International GT Open - Super GT	AF Corse	1	0	0	0	0	??	??
2014	Gulf 12 Hours - GT3	AF Corse	1	0	0	0	0	—N/a	5th
2015	United SportsCar Championship - GTD	AF Corse	1	0	0	0	0	1	62nd
2015	European Le Mans Series - GTC	AF Corse	5	1	1	1	2	56	4th
2015	Blancpain Endurance Series - Pro-Am	AF Corse	5	0	0	0	0	12	23rd
2015–16	Asian Le Mans Series - GT	Spirit of Race	1	0	0	0	0	10	17th
2016	IMSA SportsCar Championship - GTD	Spirit of Race	1	0	0	0	0	18	52nd
2016	European Le Mans Series - GTE	AF Corse	6	0	0	0	1	50	8th
2016	International GT Open - Pro-Am	AF Corse	8	0	0	1	2	27	9th
2016	Blancpain GT Series Endurance Cup - Pro-Am	AT Racing	1	0	0	0	0	0	NC
2016–17	Asian Le Mans Series - GT	Spirit of Race	4	1	1	0	1	38	7th
2017	Blancpain GT Series Endurance Cup - Pro	Kaspersky Motorsport	5	0	1	0	0	32	7th
2017	Intercontinental GT Challenge	Kaspersky Motorsport	1	0	1	0	0	0	NC
2017	FIA World Endurance Championship - LMGTE Am	Spirit of Race	1	1	0	0	1	50	8th
2017	24 Hours of Le Mans - LMGTE Am	Spirit of Race	1	1	0	0	1	—N/a	**2nd**
2017	International GT Open - Pro-Am	AF Corse	12	1	0	1	4	59	4th
2017	6 Hours of Vallelunga	AF Corse	1	1	0	0	1	—N/a	**1st**
2017	Italian GT Championship - Super GT3 Pro	Easy Race	4	1	0	0	2	41	16th
2017–18	Asian Le Mans Series - GT	FIST-Team AAI	2	1	1	0	2	41	6th
2018	24H Proto Series - P3	Spirit of Race	3	0	0	1	3	26	5th
2018	Blancpain GT Series Endurance Cup - Pro-Am	AF Corse	1	0	0	0	0	0	NC
2018	24 Hours of Spa - Pro-Am	AF Corse	1	0	0	0	0	0	5th
2018	Le Mans Cup - GT3	AF Corse	6	1	1	0	4	78	4th
2018	International GT Open	Luzich Racing	10	2	2	0	3	59	9th
2019	Italian GT Endurance Championship - GT3	Easy Race	4	0	0	0	1	24	5th
2019	Italian GT Sprint Championship - GT3 Pro-Am	AF Corse	2	0	0	0	0	18	9th
2020	Italian GT Endurance Championship - GT3 Pro-Am	AF Corse	1	0	0	0	1	12	8th

=== Complete Italian/Euro Formula 3000 results ===
(key) (Races in bold indicate pole position; races in italics indicate fastest lap)

Year	Entrant	1	2	3	4	5	6	7	8	9	10	DC	Points
2000	Traini Corse	VLL1	MUG	IMO	MNZ	VLL2	DON	PER	MIS; 13			NC	0
2001	Durango	VLL; 8	PER; 8	MNZ; Ret	DON; 7	ZOL; Ret	IMO; Ret	NÜR; Ret	VAL; 6			16th	1
2002	Victory Engineering	VLL; 10	NUR; C	PER; Ret	MNZ; Ret	SPA; Ret	DON; 15	BRN; 12	DIJ; 16	JER; 9	CAG; 12	NC	0

=== American open-wheel racing results ===
(key)

==== Infiniti Pro Series ====
Year	Team	1	2	3	4	5	6	7	8	9	10	11	12	Rank	Points
2003	Sam Schmidt Motorsports	HMS	PHX	INDY; 9	PPIR	KAN	NSH	MIS	STL	KTY	CHI; 12	FON	TXS	21st	40

=== Complete FIA GT Championship results ===
(key) (Races in bold indicate pole position) (Races in italics indicate fastest lap)

Year	Team	Car	Class	1	2	3	4	5	6	7	8	9	10	11	12	13	Pos.	Pts
2005	GPC Sport	Ferrari 575 GTC Evo 2005	GT1	MNZ	MAG	SIL	IMO	BRN	SPA; 6H	SPA; 12H	SPA; 24H	OSC	IST	ZHU	DUB; Ret	BHR; 6	32nd	3
2006	GPC Sport	Ferrari F430 GTC	GT2	SIL	BRN	OSC	SPA; 6H; 3	SPA; 12H; 3	SPA; 24H; Ret	LEC	DIJ	MUG	HUN	ADR	DUB		20th	6

=== Complete FIA GT3 European Championship results ===
(key) (Races in bold indicate pole position; races in italics indicate fastest lap)

Year	Entrant	Chassis	Engine	1	2	3	4	5	6	7	8	9	10	Pos.	Points
2006	Racing Box	Dodge Viper Competition Coupe	Dodge Viper 8.3 L V10	SIL; 1; 4	SIL; 2; 5	OSC; 1; 20	OSC; 2; 4	SPA; 1; 31	SPA; 2; 23	DIJ; 1; 6	DIJ; 2 Ret	MUG; 1; 14	MUG; 2; 5	12th	21

=== Complete European Le Mans Series results ===
(key) (Races in bold indicate pole position; results in italics indicate fastest lap)

Year	Entrant	Class	Chassis	Engine	1	2	3	4	5	6	Rank	Points
2006	GPC Sport	GT2	Ferrari F430GT	Ferrari 4.0L V8	IST	SPA	NUR; 1	DON; Ret	JAR		9th	10
2007	Racing Box	GT1	Saleen S7-R	Ford 7.0L V8	MNZ; 5	VAL; 2	NUR; 4	SPA; Ret	SIL; 6	MIL	7th	20
2010	Racing Box	LMP2	Lola B09/80	Judd DB 3.4 L V8	LEC; Ret	SPA; WD	ALG	HUN; 6	SIL; 7		15th	15
2011	AF Corse	LMGTE Am	Ferrari F430 GT2	Ferrari 4.0 L V8	LEC; 2	SPA; 2	IMO; 3	SIL; 5	EST; 4		2nd	58
2012	AF Corse	LMGTE Am	Ferrari 458 Italia GT2	Ferrari 4.5 L V8	LEC; 3	**DON**; 2	PET; Ret				2nd	34
2013	AF Corse	LMGTE	Ferrari 458 Italia GT2	Ferrari 4.5 L V8	SIL; 7	IMO; 2	RBR; 4	HUN; 3	LEC; 4		4th	63
2014	AF Corse	LMGTE	Ferrari 458 Italia GT2	Ferrari 4.5 L V8	SIL; 6	IMO; Ret	RBR; 5	LEC; 4	EST; 2		6th	48
2015	AF Corse	GTC	Ferrari 458 Italia GT3	Ferrari 4.5 L V8	SIL; Ret	**IMO**; 2	RBR; 4	LEC; Ret	EST; 1		4th	56
2016	AF Corse	LMGTE	Ferrari 458 Italia GT2	Ferrari 4.5 L V8	SIL; 7	IMO; 7	RBR; 2	LEC; Ret	SPA; 6	EST; 4	8th	50

=== 24 Hours of Le Mans results ===
Year	Team	Co-Drivers	Car	Class	Laps	Pos.	Class Pos.
2010	(Italy) Racing Box	(Italy) Luca Pirri (Italy) Piergiuseppe Perazzini	Lola B08/80	LMP2	57	DNF	DNF
2011	(Italy) AF Corse	(Italy) Piergiuseppe Perazzini (Republic of Ireland) Seán Paul Breslin	Ferrari F430 GTE	GTE; Am	188	DNF	DNF
2012	(Italy) AF Corse	(Monaco) Olivier Beretta (Italy) Andrea Bertolini	Ferrari 458 Italia GTC	GTE; Pro	326	22nd	4th
2013	(Italy) AF Corse	(South Africa) Jack Gerber (Republic of Ireland) Matt Griffin	Ferrari 458 Italia GT2	GTE Am	305	27th	**3rd**
2014	(Italy) AF Corse	(Argentina) Luis Pérez Companc (Italy) Mirko Venturi	Ferrari 458 Italia GT2	GTE; Am	331	22nd	**3rd**
2017	(Switzerland) Spirit of Race	(United Kingdom) Duncan Cameron (United Kingdom) Aaron Scott	Ferrari 488 GTE	GTE; Am	331	28th	**2nd**

=== Complete GT World Challenge results ===
==== GT World Challenge Europe Endurance Cup ====
(Races in bold indicate pole position) (Races in italics indicate fastest lap)

Year	Team	Car	Class	1	2	3	4	5	6	7	8	Pos.	Points
2011	AF Corse	Ferrari 458 Italia GT3	Pro-Am	MNZ	NAV	SPA; 6H ?	SPA; 12H ?	SPA; 24H; 9	MAG	SIL; 7		14th	19
2012	AF Corse	Ferrari 458 Italia GT3	Pro-Am	MNZ; 32	SIL	LEC; 32	SPA; 6H ?	SPA; 12H ?	SPA; 24H; 29	NÜR; 38	NAV; Ret	NC	0
2013	AF Corse	Ferrari 458 Italia GT3	Pro-Am	MNZ	SIL	LEC	SPA; 6H ?	SPA; 12H ?	SPA; 24H; 32	NÜR		23rd	17
2014	AF Corse	Ferrari 458 Italia GT3	Pro-Am	MNZ	SIL	LEC	SPA; 6H; 19	SPA; 12H; 13	SPA; 24H; 6	NÜR		9th	31
2015	AF Corse	Ferrari 458 Italia GT3	Pro-Am	MNZ; 10	SIL; 51	LEC; 38	SPA; 6H; 54	SPA; 12H; 54	SPA; 24H; Ret	NÜR; 32		22nd	12
2016	AF Corse	Ferrari 488 GT3	Pro-Am	MNZ	SIL	LEC	SPA; 6H; 48	SPA; 12H; 34	SPA; 24H; Ret	NÜR		NC	0
2017	Kaspersky Motorsport	Ferrari 488 GT3	Pro	MON; 4	SIL; 23	LEC; Ret	**SPA**; **6H**; 1	**SPA**; **12H**; 3	**SPA**; **24H**; Ret	CAT; 18		7th	32
2018	AF Corse	Ferrari 488 GT3	Pro-Am	MON	SIL	LEC	SPA; 6H; 40	SPA; 12H; 37	SPA; 24H; 26	CAT		18th	16

^{†} Did not finish, but was classified as he had completed more than 90% of the race distance.

=== Complete Intercontinental Le Mans Cup results ===
(key) (Races in bold indicate pole position; races in italics indicate fastest lap)

Year	Entrant	Class	Chassis	Engine	1	2	3	4	5	6	7	Rank	Points
2011	AF Corse	LMGTE Am	Ferrari F430 GTE	Ferrari F136 GT 4.0 L V8	SEB	SPA; 2	**LMS**; Ret	IMO; 3	SIL; 5	ATL	ZHU; Ret	/	/

=== Complete FIA World Endurance Championship results ===
(key) (Races in bold indicate pole position; races in italics indicate fastest lap)

Year	Entrant	Class	Chassis	Engine	1	2	3	4	5	6	7	8	9	Rank	Points
2012	AF Corse	LMGTE Pro	Ferrari 458 Italia GT2	Ferrari F142 4.5L V8	SEB; 1		LMS; 4							/	/
2012	AF Corse	LMGTE Am	Ferrari 458 Italia GT2	Ferrari F142 4.5L V8		SPA; 3								/	/
2012	AF Corse-Waltrip	LMGTE Am	Ferrari 458 Italia GT2	Ferrari F142 4.5L V8				SIL; 1	SÃO	BHR	FUJ	SHA; 4		/	/
2013	AF Corse	LMGTE Am	Ferrari 458 Italia GT2	Ferrari F142 4.5L V8	SIL; 8	SPA; 8	LMS; 2	SÃO; Ret	COA; 7	FUJ; 7	SHA; 6	BHR		12th	53
2014	AF Corse	LMGTE Am	Ferrari 458 Italia GT2	Ferrari F142 4.5L V8	SIL; 6	**SPA**; 1	LMS; 3	COA; 4	FUJ	SHA	BHR	SÃO		6th	76
2017	Spirit of Race	LMGTE Am	Ferrari 488 GTE	Ferrari F154CB 3.9 L Turbo V8	SIL	SPA	LMS; 1	NÜR	MEX	COA	FUJ	SHA	BHR	8th	50

=== Complete FIA GT1 World Championship results ===
(key) (Races in bold indicate pole position) (Races in italics indicate fastest lap)

Year	Team	Car	1	2	3	4	5	6	7	8	9	10	11	12	13	14	15	16	17	18	Pos	Points
2012	AF Corse	Ferrari 458 Italia GT3	NOG; QR	NOG; CR	ZOL; QR	ZOL; CR	NAV; QR	NAV; QR	SVK; QR	SVK; CR	ALG; QR	ALG; CR	SVK; QR	SVK; CR	MOS; QR	MOS; CR	NUR; QR	NUR; CR	DON; QR; Ret	DON; CR; 8	21st	4

=== Complete IMSA SportsCar Championship results ===
(key) (Races in bold indicate pole position; races in italics indicate fastest lap)

Year	Entrant	Class	Make	Engine	1	2	3	4	5	6	7	8	9	10	11	Rank	Points
2014	Spirit of Race	GTD	Ferrari 458 Italia GT3	Ferrari 4.5 L V8	DAY; 15	SEB; 13	LAG	DET	WGL	MOS	IMS	ELK	VIR	COA	PET; 16	86th	19
2015	AF Corse	GTD	Ferrari 458 Italia GT3	Ferrari 4.5 L V8	DAY	SEB; 10†	LAG	DET	WGL	LIM	ELK	VIR	COA	PET		62nd	1
2016	Spirit of Race	GTD	Ferrari 458 Italia GT3	Ferrari 4.5 L V8	DAY; 11	SEB	LGA	BEL	WGL	MOS	LIM	ELK	VIR	AUS	PET	52nd	21

=== Complete Asian Le Mans Series results ===
(key) (Races in bold indicate pole position) (Races in italics indicate fastest lap)

Year	Team	Class	Car	Engine	1	2	3	4	Pos.	Points
2015–16	Spirit of Race	GT	Ferrari 458 Italia GT3	Ferrari F136 4.5 L V8	FUJ	SEP	BUR	SEP; 5	17th	10
2016–17	Spirit of Race	GT	Ferrari 488 GT3	Ferrari F154CB 3.9 L Turbo V8	**ZHU**; 1	FUJ; Ret	BUR; 8	SEP; 8	7th	34
2017–18	FIST-Team AAI	GT	Ferrari 488 GT3	Ferrari F154CB 3.9 L Turbo V8	ZHU	FUJ; 1	**BUR**; 3	SEP	6th	41

=== Complete Le Mans Cup results ===
(key) (Races in bold indicate pole position; results in italics indicate fastest lap)

Year	Entrant	Class	Chassis	1	2	3	4	5	6	7	Rank	Points
2018	AF Corse	GT3	Ferrari 488 GT3	LEC; 6	MNZ; 2	**LMS**; **1**; 1	LMS; 2 Ret	RBR; 2	SPA; WD	ALG; 2	4th	78
