= 2003 International Formula 3000 Championship =

Motor racing competition

The 2003 International Formula 3000 season was the thirty-seventh season of the second-tier of Formula One feeder championship and also nineteenth season under the International Formula 3000 Championship moniker. It featured the 2003 FIA Formula 3000 International Championship with titles awarded for both Drivers and Teams. The championship was contested over ten events from 19 April to 13 September 2003.

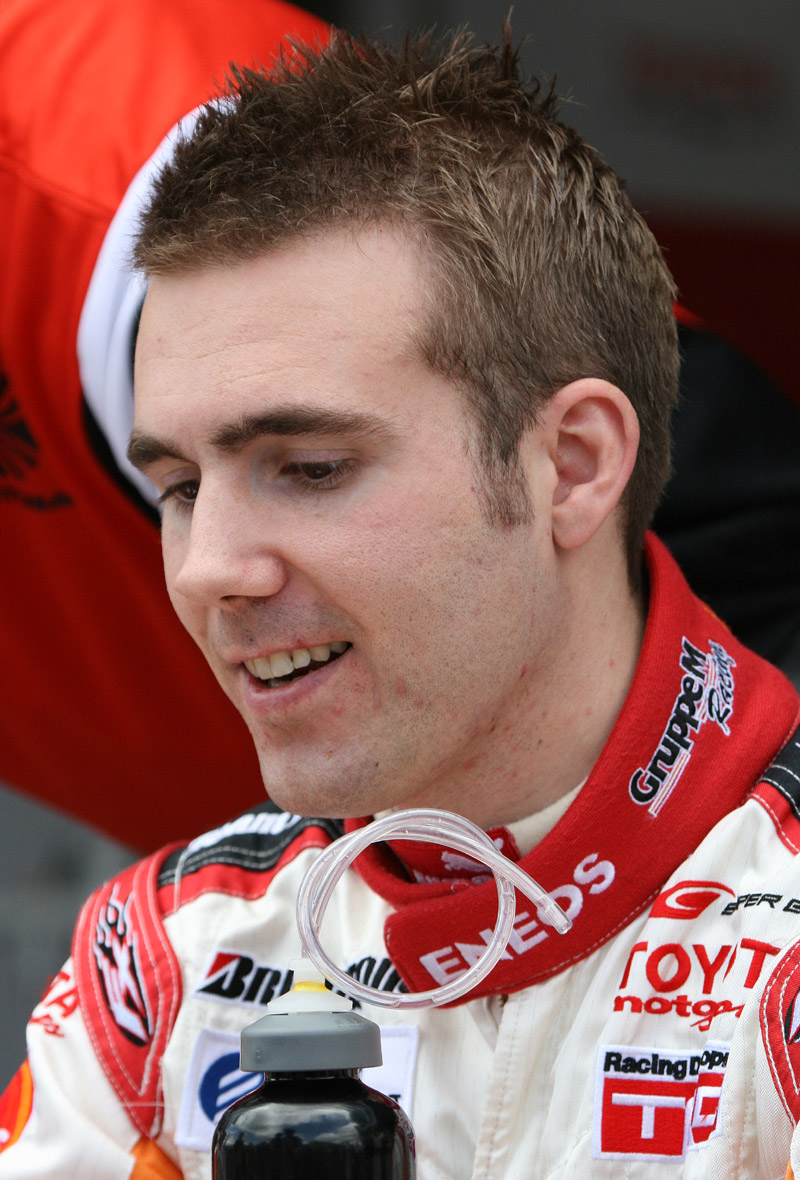
The Drivers Championship was won by Björn Wirdheim (pictured in 2008), and the Teams Championship was awarded to Arden International Ltd

.

== Teams and drivers ==
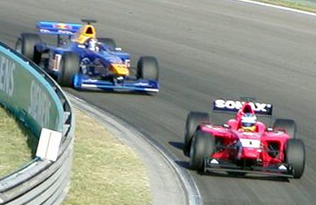
Björn Wirdheim, pictured at the Hungaroring round, won the Drivers' Championship. Vitantonio Liuzzi, driving the car behind him, placed fourth.

The following teams and drivers contested the championship.

Team	No.	Driver	Rounds
(United Kingdom) Arden International	1	(Sweden) Björn Wirdheim	All
(United Kingdom) Arden International	2	(United States) Townsend Bell	All
(Italy) Coloni Motorsport	3	(Brazil) Ricardo Sperafico	All
(Italy) Coloni Motorsport	4	(Hungary) Zsolt Baumgartner	1–9
(Italy) Coloni Motorsport	4	(San Marino) Christian Montanari	10
(United Kingdom) Super Nova Racing	5	(Italy) Enrico Toccacelo	All
(United Kingdom) Super Nova Racing	6	(United States) Derek Hill	1–6
(United Kingdom) Super Nova Racing	6	(Denmark) Nicolas Kiesa	7
(United Kingdom) Super Nova Racing	6	(United Kingdom) Sam Hancock	8–10
(Denmark) Den Blå Avis	7	(Denmark) Nicolas Kiesa	1–6
(Denmark) Den Blå Avis	8	(United Kingdom) Robbie Kerr	1
(Denmark) Den Blå Avis	8	(United States) Philip Giebler	2–6
(Italy) Durango	9	(Italy) Giorgio Pantano	All
(Italy) Durango	10	(Italy) Raffaele Giammaria	All
(Belgium) Team Astromega	11	(Germany) Tony Schmidt	All
(Belgium) Team Astromega	12	(Belgium) Jeffrey van Hooydonk	1–2, 4–6, 10
(Belgium) Team Astromega	12	(Republic of Ireland) Michael Keohane	7–8
(Czech Republic) Superfund ISR – Charouz	14	(Czech Republic) Jaroslav Janiš	All
(Czech Republic) Superfund ISR – Charouz	15	(France) Yannick Schroeder	1–8
(Austria) Red Bull Junior Team	16	(Italy) Vitantonio Liuzzi	All
(Austria) Red Bull Junior Team	17	(Austria) Patrick Friesacher	1–2, 5–10
(Austria) Red Bull Junior Team	17	(Austria) Bernhard Auinger	3–4
(Spain) BCN F3000	18	(Australia) Rob Nguyen	1–3
(Spain) BCN F3000	18	(United States) Will Langhorne	4–8
(Spain) BCN F3000	18	(Italy) Ferdinando Monfardini	9–10
(Spain) BCN F3000	19	(Italy) Valerio Scassellati	1, 5–6, 8
(Spain) BCN F3000	19	(Italy) Alessandro Piccolo	2–4, 10
(Spain) BCN F3000	19	(United Kingdom) Marc Hynes	7
(Spain) BCN F3000	19	(Italy) Giovanni Berton	9
(United Kingdom) Brand Motorsport	20	(France) Nicolas Minassian	1
(United Kingdom) Brand Motorsport	21	(United Kingdom) Gary Paffett	1

== Calendar ==
The 2003 FIA Formula 3000 International Championship was contested over a ten event series. The round at Circuit de Spa-Francorchamps was cancelled due to the FIA banning tobacco advertising, which cancelled the F1 race.

Event	Circuit	Date	Distance	Pole position	Fastest lap	Winning driver	Winning team	Report
1	(Italy) Autodromo Enzo e Dino Ferrari	20 April	31 laps / 152.686 km	(Sweden) Björn Wirdheim	(Sweden) Björn Wirdheim	(Sweden) Björn Wirdheim	(United Kingdom) Arden International	Report
2	(Spain) Circuit de Catalunya	3 May	33 laps / 152.565 km	(Italy) Giorgio Pantano	(Italy) Giorgio Pantano	(Italy) Giorgio Pantano	(Italy) Durango	Report
3	(Austria) A1-Ring	17 May	35 laps / 151.410 km	(Brazil) Ricardo Sperafico	(Sweden) Björn Wirdheim	(Brazil) Ricardo Sperafico	(Italy) Coloni Motorsport	Report
4	Circuit de Monaco	31 May	45 laps / 150.3 km	(Sweden) Björn Wirdheim	(Sweden) Björn Wirdheim	(Denmark) Nicolas Kiesa	(Denmark) Den Blå Avis	Report
5	(Germany) Nürburgring	28 June	30 laps / 154.423 km	(Sweden) Björn Wirdheim	(Sweden) Björn Wirdheim	(Italy) Enrico Toccacelo	(United Kingdom) Super Nova Racing	Report
6	(France) Circuit de Nevers Magny-Cours	5 July	35 laps / 154.201 km	(Italy) Giorgio Pantano	(Italy) Giorgio Pantano	(Italy) Giorgio Pantano	(Italy) Durango	Report
7	(United Kingdom) Silverstone Circuit	19 July	30 laps / 154.125 km	(Sweden) Björn Wirdheim	(Sweden) Björn Wirdheim	(Sweden) Björn Wirdheim	(United Kingdom) Arden International	Report
8	(Germany) Hockenheimring	2 August	33 laps / 150.942 km	(Brazil) Ricardo Sperafico	(Sweden) Björn Wirdheim	(Brazil) Ricardo Sperafico	(Italy) Coloni Motorsport	Report
9	(Hungary) Hungaroring	23 August	35 laps / 153.440 km	(Italy) Vitantonio Liuzzi	(Austria) Patrick Friesacher	(Austria) Patrick Friesacher	(Austria) Red Bull Junior Team	Report
10	(Italy) Autodromo Nazionale Monza	13 September	26 laps / 150.353 km	(Sweden) Björn Wirdheim	(Sweden) Björn Wirdheim	(Sweden) Björn Wirdheim	(United Kingdom) Arden International	Report

== Drivers' Championship ==
Pos	Driver	IMO (Italy)	CAT (Spain)	A1R (Austria)	MON (Monaco)	NÜR (Germany)	MAG (France)	SIL (United Kingdom)	HOC (Germany)	HUN (Hungary)	MNZ (Italy)	Points
1	(Sweden) Björn Wirdheim	**1**	2	2	**2**	**13**	2	**1**	2	2	**1**	78
2	(Brazil) Ricardo Sperafico	3	Ret	**1**	DSQ	14	3	4	**1**	Ret	3	43
3	(Italy) Giorgio Pantano	Ret	**1**	3	Ret	16	**1**	2	7	4	Ret	41
4	(Italy) Vitantonio Liuzzi	4	Ret	4	Ret	2	4	3	4	**9**	4	39
5	(Austria) Patrick Friesacher	2	Ret			Ret	11	5	3	1	2	36
6	(Italy) Enrico Toccacelo	5	3	5	Ret	1	13	6	Ret	7	8	30
7	(Denmark) Nicolas Kiesa	12	10	6	1	3	Ret	8				20
8	(Czech Republic) Jaroslav Janiš	DNS	4	9	4	6	Ret	10	8	5	7	20
9	(United States) Townsend Bell	9	12	7	6	Ret	12	7	5	3	Ret	17
10	(Italy) Raffaele Giammaria	7	Ret	14	3	7	8	Ret	10	6	Ret	14
11	(Germany) Tony Schmidt	Ret	6	Ret	Ret	10	5	Ret	6	8	6	14
12	(France) Yannick Schroeder	6	8	Ret	7	4	7	9	11			13
13	(Belgium) Jeffrey van Hooydonk	Ret	Ret		8	8	6				5	9
14	(Hungary) Zsolt Baumgartner	10	7	10	5	11	9	11	9	DNS		6
15	(Australia) Rob Nguyen	8	5	13								5
16	(United States) Derek Hill	15	11	Ret	DSQ	5	10					4
17	(United States) Phil Giebler		Ret	8	Ret	9	DNS					1
18	(Italy) Alessandro Piccolo		9	12	DNS						11	0
19	(Austria) Bernhard Auinger			11	9							0
20	(San Marino) Christian Montanari										9	0
21	(United States) Will Langhorne				10	12	14	13	12			0
22	(Italy) Ferdinando Monfardini									Ret	10	0
23	(Italy) Giovanni Berton									10		0
24	(United Kingdom) Sam Hancock								13	11	DNS	0
25	(France) Nicolas Minassian	11										0
26	(Republic of Ireland) Michael Keohane							12	Ret			0
27	(Italy) Valerio Scassellati	13				15	15		14			0
28	(United Kingdom) Marc Hynes							14				0
29	(United Kingdom) Gary Paffett	14										0
–	(United Kingdom) Robbie Kerr	DNS										0
Pos	Driver	IMO (Italy)	CAT (Spain)	A1R (Austria)	MON (Monaco)	NÜR (Germany)	MAG (France)	SIL (United Kingdom)	HOC (Germany)	HUN (Hungary)	MNZ (Italy)	Points

Colour	Result
Gold	Winner
Silver	Second place
Bronze	Third place
Green	Points classification
Blue	Non-points classification
Blue	Non-classified finish (NC)
Purple	Retired, not classified (Ret)
Red	Did not qualify (DNQ)
Red	Did not pre-qualify (DNPQ)
Black	Disqualified (DSQ)
White	Did not start (DNS)
White	Withdrew (WD)
White	Race cancelled (C)
Blank	Did not practice (DNP)
Blank	Did not arrive (DNA)
Blank	Excluded (EX)

**Bold** – Pole
Italics – Fastest lap

- All drivers used Lola B02/50 chassis with Zytek-Judd KV engines and Avon tyres.
- Championship points were awarded on a 10-8-6-5-4-3-2-1 basis to the first eight finishers at each event. If two or more drivers had the same number of points (including 0 points), their positions in the Championship was fixed according to the quality of their places. Under this system one first place was better than any number of second places, one second place was better than any number of third places and so on.

== Teams Championship ==
Points for the 2003 FIA Formula 3000 International Championship for Teams were awarded on a 10-8-6-5-4-3-2-1 basis for the first eight places at each event. Results from both team cars were taken into account.

Position	Team	IMO (Italy)	CAT (Spain)	A1R (Austria)	MON (Monaco)	NUR (Germany)	MAG (France)	SIL (United Kingdom)	HOC (Germany)	HUN (Hungary)	MNZ (Italy)	Total
1	(United Kingdom) Arden International Ltd	10	8	10	11	0	8	12	12	14	10	95
2	(Austria) Red Bull Junior Team F3000	13	0	5	0	8	5	10	11	10	13	75
3	(Italy) Durango Formula	2	10	6	6	2	11	8	2	8	0	55
4	(Italy) Coloni Motorsport	6	2	10	4	0	6	5	10	0	6	49
5	(United Kingdom) Super Nova Racing Ltd	4	6	4	0	14	0	4	0	2	1	35
6	(Czech Republic) ISR – Charouz	3	6	0	7	8	2	0	1	4	2	33
7	(Belgium) Team Astromega	0	3	0	1	1	7	0	3	1	7	23
8	(Denmark) Den Blå Avis	0	0	4	10	6	0	–	–	–	–	20
9	(Spain) BCN F3000	1	4	0	0	0	0	0	0	0	0	5
10	(United Kingdom) Brand Motorsports	0	–	–	–	–	–	–	–	–	–	0

== See also ==
2003 Euro Formula 3000 season
