= Giovanni Montanari =

Italian former racing driver (born 1976)

- Nationality: Italian
- Born: April 24, 1976 (age 50) Bologna, Italy

European F3000
- Years active: 2001
- Teams: B&C Competition
- Starts: 5
- Wins: 0
- Poles: 0
- Best finish: 14 in 2001

Previous series
- 2000 1998-1999: Italian Formula 3000; International Formula 3000 Championship

Giovanni Montanari (born 24 April 1976) is an Italian former racing driver.

== Career ==
Montanari began racing in Formula Opel between 1996 and 1997, representing Italy in the Nations Cup and winning in 1997 with Giovanni Anapoli. In the 1997 championship, he completed thirteen races, winning one and securing five podium finishes. His points total, 103, meant he finished the season in fourth place.

In 1998, Montanari graduated to International Formula 3000 where he drove for Draco Engineering. His best result came in Barcelona, where he qualified seventh and finished eighth. In 1999, he joined GP Racing but failed to qualify for either race he entered. Later in the season, he entered two races with Durango Racing, once again failing to qualify on both occasions.

In 2000, Montanari stepped into Italian F3000 with previous employer Durango Formula. He completed the first three races of the season with a best finish of fifth at Mugello Circuit. In 2001, he raced in European F3000 for five races with B&C Competition. He suffered four retirements before finishing his final race with the team at Donington Park in sixth, meaning he scored a single championship point.

=== Complete International Formula 3000 results ===
(key) (Races in bold indicate pole position; races in italics indicate fastest lap.)

Year	Entrant	1	2	3	4	5	6	7	8	9	10	11	12	Pos.	Pts
1998	Draco Engineering	OSC; Ret	IMO; 15	CAT; 8	SIL; 13	MON; 13	PAU; Ret	A1R; 14	HOC; Ret	HUN; 19	SPA; 16	PER; Ret	NÜR; 10	27th	0
1999	GP Racing	IMO; DNQ	MON; DNQ	CAT; DNQ	MAG; DNQ									NC	0
1999	Durango									SPA; DNQ	NÜR; DNQ			NC	0
