= Den Blå Avis (motor racing team) =

(Denmark) Den Blå Avis Racing Team
- Founded: 1997
- Folded: 2003
- Team principal(s): David Sears
- Former series: Formula 3000

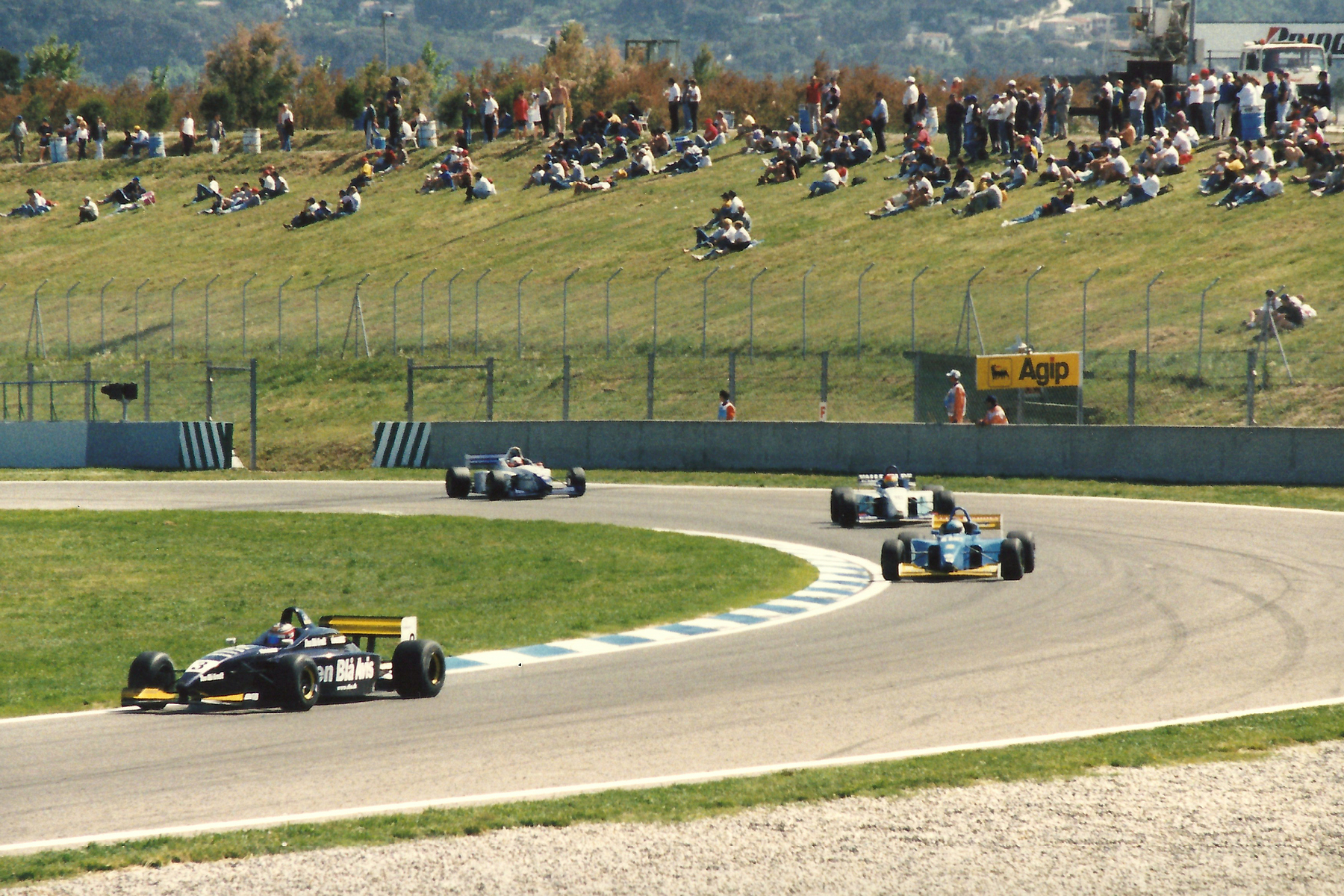
Jason Watt driving for Den Blå Avis car the Formula 3000 races at the 1998 Barcelona round

Den Blå Avis Racing Team was a Danish auto racing team owned by the buying and selling platform: Den Blå Avis, whom competed in the FIA Formula 3000 Championship. The team has also competed in the Eurocup Formula Renault series in the 2001–2002 seasons.

== History ==
The Den Blå Avis stable was founded for Jason Watt in 1997. Den Blå Avis owner Karsten Ree wanted to help his compatriot, and entered into a partnership with Jan Magnussen's manager at the time, David Sears. Sears already had one of the best teams in the Formula 3000 series, Super Nova Racing, but here there was no room for the debutant Watt. The solution was Den Blå Avis a Super Nova satellite team run by Sears and financed by Ree.

The team stopped operating in the middle of the season in 2003 when the funding ran out.

== Complete Formula 3000 results ==
Year	Chassis	Engine	Tyres	Drivers	1	2	3	4	5	6	7	8	9	10	11	12	T.C.	Points
1997	Lola T96/50	Zytek V8	A		SIL	PAU	HEL	NÜR	PER	HOC	A1R	SPA	MUG	JER			3rd	25
1997	Lola T96/50	Zytek V8	A	(Denmark) Jason Watt	4	12	DNS	2	Ret	4	Ret	1	2	Ret			3rd	25
1998	Lola T96/50	Zytek V8	A		OSC	IMO	CAT	SIL	MON	PAU	A1R	HOC	HUN	SPA	PER	NÜR	3rd	40
1998	Lola T96/50	Zytek V8	A	(Denmark) Jason Watt	7	1	7	3	Ret	Ret	3	2	10	8	Ret	2	3rd	40
1998	Lola T96/50	Zytek V8	A	(United Kingdom) Gareth Rees	Ret	Ret	Ret	4	Ret	4	Ret	6	DNS	12	4	Ret	3rd	40
1999 – 2002: "Den Blå Avis" did not compete.
2003	Lola B02/50	Zytek V8	A		IMO	CAT	A1R	MON	NÜR	MAG	SIL	HOC	HUN	MNZ			8th	20
2003	Lola B02/50	Zytek V8	A	(Denmark) Nicolas Kiesa	12	10	6	1	3	Ret							8th	20
2003	Lola B02/50	Zytek V8	A	(United Kingdom) Robbie Kerr	DNS												8th	20
2003	Lola B02/50	Zytek V8	A	(United States) Phil Giebler		Ret	8	Ret	9	DNS							8th	20
