= Yannick Schroeder =

French racing driver

Yannick Schroeder (born 10 August,1979 in Metz) is a French racing car driver.

Schroeder competed in French Formula Three in 1999 and 2000, finishing Tenth and Ninth in the championships in the respective years. In 2001, he graduated to European F3000 and stayed there until 2002, placing sixth in the championship with two podium finishes.

In the 2003, Schroeder graduated to International Formula 3000 with the ISR Racing team, having driven for Charouz Racing in Euro F3000. In his maiden year, he scored thirteen points and placed 12th in the championship. By the time the 2004 season started, he had moved to Durango. The loss of a sponsor during the season forced him to quit the championship. However, he had the consolation of coming 9th in the championship and taking a podium finish at the Nürburgring round of the series.

== Racing record ==
=== Complete Euro Formula 3000 results ===
(key) (Races in bold indicate pole position; races in italics indicate fastest lap)

Year	Entrant	1	2	3	4	5	6	7	8	9	DC	Points
2001	Uboldi Corse	VLL	PER	MNZ	DON; Ret	ZOL; 8	IMO; 9	NÜR; 6	VAL		15th	1
2002	Uboldi Corse	VLL; 9	PER; Ret	MOZ; Ret	SPA; 6						6th	14
2002	Charouz ISR Racing					DON; 2	BRN; 6	DIJ; 9	JER; 2	CAG; Ret	6th	14

=== Complete International Formula 3000 results ===
Year	Entrant	1	2	3	4	5	6	7	8	9	10	DC	Points
2003	Superfund ISR - Charouz	IMO; 6	CAT; 8	A1R; Ret	MON; 7	NUR; 4	MAG; 7	SIL; 9	HOC; 11	HUN	MNZ	12th	13
2004	Durango Corse	IMO; 7	CAT; Ret	MON; 10	NUR; 3	MAG; 4	SIL; 14	HOC; Ret	HUN; Ret	SPA	MNZ	9th	13
