= Jean de Pourtales =

French racing driver

- Nationality: (France) French
- Born: August 19, 1965 (age 60)

24 Hours of Le Mans career
- Years: 2007 – 2010
- Teams: Kruse Motorsport (KSM)
- Best finish: 26th (2010)
- Class wins: 0

Jean de Pourtales (born 19 August 1965) is a French racing driver from Neuilly-sur-Seine. Before his motorsport career, de Pourtales was a member of the British junior alpine ski team, and attended the junior world ski championships. However, an accident unfortunately cut short his skiing career. De Pourtales began his career in British Formula Vauxhall Junior in 1995 and moved to British Formula Renault in 1998 and finished tenth. He competed in Euro Formula 3000 part-time in 1999 and from 2001 to 2004 with his best season finish being 17th in 2003. Since then, he has participated part-time in the Le Mans Series LMP2 class and the 24 Hours of Le Mans for Kruse Schiller Motorsport.

== Handicap ==
De Pourtales is a rarity in motorsport, as he competes with an artificial limb. A road accident in his twenties resulted in the loss of his left hand and forearm and has since raced with a special steering wheel that attaches to a prosthetic arm enabling him to compete just like his rivals.

== 24 Hours of Le Mans results ==
Year	Team	Co-Drivers	Car	Class	Laps	Pos.	Class Pos.
2007	(Germany) Kruse Motorsport	(Canada) Tony Burgess (Austria) Norbert Siedler	Pescarolo 01-Judd	LMP2	98	DNF	DNF
2008	(Germany) Kruse Schiller Motorsport	(Japan) Hideki Noda (Denmark) Allan Simonsen	Lola B05/40-Mazda	LMP2	147	DNF	DNF
2009	(Germany) Kruse Schiller Motorsport	(Japan) Hideki Noda (Hong Kong) Matthew Marsh	Lola B07/46-Mazda	LMP2	261	DNF	DNF
2010	(Germany) Kruse Schiller Motorsport	(Japan) Hideki Noda (United Kingdom) Jonathan Kennard	Lola B07/40-Judd	LMP2	291	26th	10th
