= Michael Bentwood =

British racing driver (born 1978)

Michael Bentwood (born 10 January 1978) is a British motorsport driver from Altrincham. He competed across several categories of single-seater and touring car racing during the 1990s and 2000s, including the British Touring Car Championship (BTCC) and the British GT Championship. Following his retirement from professional racing in 2012, he pursued a career in driver training and automotive consultancy.

== Early career ==
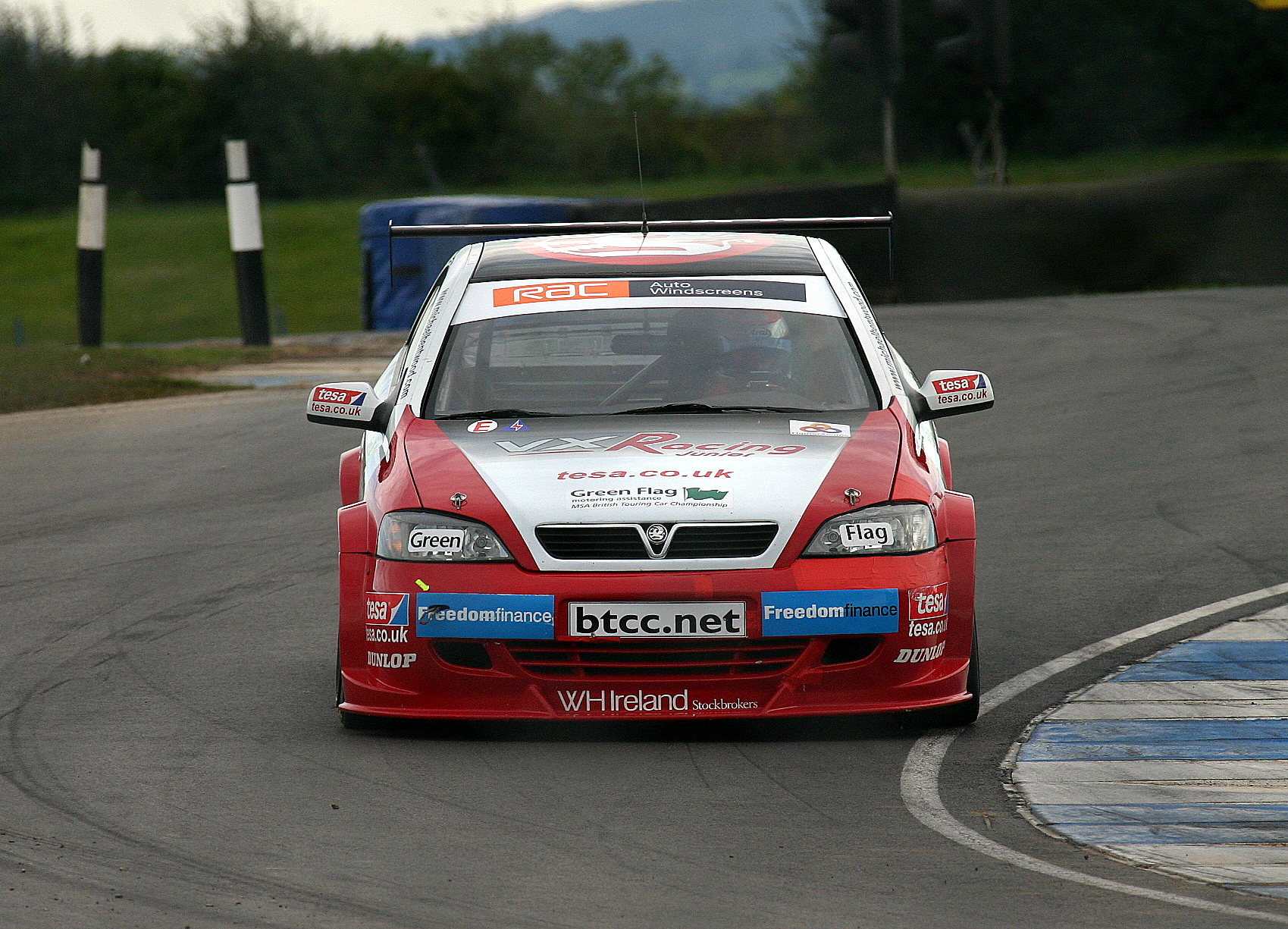
Bentwood driving the VXR Junior Vauxhall Astra Coupé at Donington Park during the 2004 British Touring Car Championship season.

Bentwood began racing in karting before entering single-seater competition. In 1994, he contested the Formula First Winter Series, finishing tenth. The following year, he placed fifth in the Formula Vauxhall Junior Winter Series.

Between 1997 and 2000, Bentwood competed in the British Formula 3 Class A Championship. In 2000, he was the highest-placed British driver in that series, winning the Raymond Mays Trophy and the BRDC Spencer Charrington Trophy. He was subsequently awarded membership of the British Racing Drivers’ Club (BRDC). He was initially proposed by Johnny Herbert and seconded by Sir Frank Williams; however, as BRDC rules at the time permitted only one director to formally put forward a candidate, Sir Frank Williams was replaced as seconder by John Caldwell.

In 2001, alongside his single-seater commitments, Bentwood conducted a private test of a Jordan Formula One car at Turweston Aerodrome to assist the team with software profiling and oil starvation evaluation. He was reported to have been under consideration for a testing contract supported by tobacco sponsor Benson & Hedges, but the team ultimately signed Takuma Sato, who brought a works Honda engine arrangement.

Also in 2001, Bentwood competed in the Euro Formula 3000 Series, finishing twelfth in the standings with several top-six results.

== British Touring Car Championship (2003–2004) ==
Bentwood made his BTCC debut in 2003 with Edenbridge Racing, driving a BMW 320i. With five wins, he finished third in the Championship - Michael’s first year in touring cars and what proved to be the final season of the production class category.

For 2004, with the production class abolished, he joined VX Racing Junior, a semi-works arrangement with Techspeed, driving a Vauxhall Astra Coupé. He placed seventh in the Independents’ Championship and thirteenth overall, recording class wins and podium finishes in the main championship.

== British GT and GT3 (2005–2011) ==
In 2005, Bentwood contested the British GT Championship with RJN Motorsport as a works driver in a Nissan 350Z, sharing duties with Alister McRae and Anthony Reid among others. Michael competed for the lead against Ben Collins in the Porsche and Tim Mullen in the Ferrari. He also entered the Britcar 24 Hour race at Silverstone Circuit in a Lotus Elise Sport, though the car retired with mechanical problems.

A knee operation restricted his programme in 2006, during which he drove in selected rounds of the British GT Championship and the FIA GT3 Championship for Barwell Motorsport in an Aston Martin DBRS9. He continued with Barwell in 2007, recording his first GT3 victory with co-driver Tom Alexander.

In 2008 he remained in the DBRS9 for 22GT Racing, taking pole position at Thruxton alongside Allan Simonsen and achieving several podium finishes. That year he also worked with Prodrive on traction control software development for their GT3 customer programme, and competed at the Le Mans Classic with Tom Alexander in a 1959 Aston Martin DB4 GT.

In 2009, Bentwood drove for RPM Motorsport in a Ford GT in selected rounds, sharing with Philip Walker. He returned to Barwell Motorsport in 2010, co-driving with Paul Whight in an Aston Martin DBRS9 for the Cadena-Barwell entry. The pairing recorded third-place finishes but did not complete the whole championship. Later that year he entered the Merdeka Millennium Endurance Race - a 12-hour event at Sepang International Circuit in Malaysia - sharing an Aston Martin DBRS9 with Frank Yu and Alain Li for Craft Racing, finishing fifth overall. Michael was the highest placed British driver in the highest placed British car.

Bentwood returned to the British GT Championship in 2011, again with Barwell Motorsport in an Aston Martin DBRS9, co-driving with Paul Whight. The pair finished on the podium in the opening round at Oulton Park and competed throughout the season before Bentwood retired from professional racing in 2012.

== Automotive consultancy and instruction (2012–present) ==
Following his retirement from racing, Bentwood worked as a driving consultant and instructor for a number of automotive manufacturers. Over several years he undertook consultancy roles with thirteen different manufacturers, covering the design of driving events and the technical assessment of engineers, including work with Bentley Motors.

Bentwood subsequently joined Jaguar Land Rover (JLR) as global lead instructor, with a focus on the United States and East Asia markets. In this role he was responsible for raising driver training standards and assessing team leaders across the business.

In 2016, Bentwood left JLR to establish On Track Driving Ltd, a company providing professional racing drivers and experienced instructors to premium automotive clients. The business has delivered bespoke driving events, risk assessments, and technical driver training for manufacturers including Ferrari, Lexus, and Bentley.

== Results record ==
=== Complete British Touring Car Championship results ===
(key) Races in bold indicate pole position (1 point awarded just for first race, 2003 in class) Races in italics indicate fastest lap (1 point awarded all races, 2003 in class) * signifies that driver lead race for at least one lap (1 point awarded all races)

Year	Team	Car	Class	1	2	3	4	5	6	7	8	9	10	11	12	13	14	15	16	17	18	19	20	21	22	23	24	25	26	27	28	29	30	Pos	Pts	Class
2003	Edenbridge Racing	BMW 320i	P	MON; 1 ovr:10 cls:4	MON; 2 ovr:11 cls:1	BRH; 1 ovr:14 cls:1	**BRH**; **2** ovr:11 cls:1	THR; 1 ovr:16 cls:4	THR; 2 ovr:14 cls:3	SIL; 1 ovr:12 cls:2	SIL; 2 ovr:14 cls:4	ROC; 1 ovr:16 cls:4	ROC; 2 Ret	**CRO**; **1** ovr:17 cls:4	CRO; 2 ovr:14 cls:2	SNE; 1 Ret	SNE; 2 DNS	BRH; 1 ovr:16 cls:1	**BRH**; **2** ovr:17 cls:2	DON; 1 ovr:17 cls:4	DON; 2 ovr:19 cls:3	OUL; 1 ovr:18 cls:3	OUL; 2 ovr:16 cls:4											N/A	**186**	**3rd**
2004	VXR Junior	Vauxhall Astra Coupé		THR; 1; 7	THR; 2; 3	THR; 3 Ret	BRH; 1 Ret	BRH; 2 DNS	BRH; 3 Ret	SIL; 1 Ret	SIL; 2; 12	SIL; 3; 10	OUL; 1; 13	OUL; 2; 11	OUL; 3; 7	MON; 1; 10	**MON**; **2**; 12	MON; 3 Ret	CRO; 1; 14	CRO; 2; 11	CRO; 3; 11	KNO; 1	KNO; 2	KNO; 3	BRH; 1; 11	BRH; 2; 7	BRH; 3; 3	SNE; 1 Ret	SNE; 2; 14	SNE; 3; 14	DON; 1; 4	DON; 2 Ret	DON; 3; 13	13th	42	
