= Alessandro Piccolo (racing driver) =

Italian racing driver (born 1980)

Alessandro Piccolo (born October 17, 1980) is an Italian racing driver.

== Career ==
=== Formula Renault ===
Piccolo finished fourth in the 2003 Formula Renault 2000 Italy championship, with 131 points.

=== Euro F3000 ===
Piccolo competed in the Euro Formula 3000 championship in both 2001 and 2002, establishing himself as a frontrunner with one win, two pole positions and five podium finishes from 17 race starts.

=== Formula 3000 ===
Piccolo moved to the International Formula 3000 series for 2003, where he was initially recruited by new team BCN Competicion to replace compatriot Valerio Scassellati after the first race. He impressed by outqualifying his more experienced team-mate Rob Nguyen in his second race in the category. However, he crashed heavily at the Casino corner of the Circuit de Monaco in practice for his third race with the team, damaging some of his vertebrae which put him out for most of the rest of the season. He eventually managed to return for the season finale at Monza, finishing the race in 11th place.

== Racing record ==
=== Complete Euro Formula 3000 results ===
(key) (Races in bold indicate pole position; races in italics indicate fastest lap)

Year	Entrant	1	2	3	4	5	6	7	8	9	DC	Points
2001	Sighinolfi Autoracing	VLL; 3	PER; 2	MNZ; Ret	DON; Ret	ZOL; 5	IMO; 14	NÜR; 4	VAL; Ret		6th	15
2002	GP Racing	**VLL**; 4	**PER**; 1	MOZ; 2	SPA; Ret	DON; 11	BRN; 10	**DIJ**; 2	JER; Ret		4th	28
2002	Euronova Racing Team									CAG; 4	4th	28

=== Complete International Formula 3000 results ===
Year	Entrant	1	2	3	4	5	6	7	8	9	10	DC	Points
2003	BCN F3000	SMR	CAT; 9	A1R; 12	MON; DNS	NUR	MAG	SIL	HOC	HUN	MNZ; 11	NC	0
