= Superfund Group =

Austrian company

- Formerly: Quadriga
- Company type: Company group
- Industry: Asset management
- Founded: October 18, 1994; 30 years ago in Vienna, Austria
- Founder: Christian Baha
- Headquarters: Vienna, Austria
- Areas served: Austria, U.S.A., Germany, Hong Kong, Japan, Poland, Switzerland
- Key people: Sonja Sarközi, CEO
- Services: managed futures, CTA
- Website: www.superfund.com

Superfund Group (formerly Quadriga) is an asset management company, specializing in alternate quantitative investment strategies. The Superfund Group was founded in 1994 by Christian Baha in Vienna, Austria and utilizes fully automated proprietary computer trading systems. It has offices in Chicago, Tokyo, Hong Kong, Amsterdam, Vienna, Warsaw, Grenada, and Zürich. The company manages over US$1 billion in different alternate strategies.

== History ==
In 1996, Superfund launched its first alternative investment product, the Superfund Q-AG.

In 2002, Superfund received admission for sale by the U.S. Securities and Exchange Commission to offer its funds in the United States. In 2003 Superfund was internationally launched as the new generation of Quadriga funds, and in 2004 Quadriga renamed itself Superfund. During the same time Superfund expanded its presence in Asia through its offices in Japan and Hong Kong and was one of the early entrants in the region. Its funds are domiciled in various jurisdictions such as Luxembourg, Cayman, U.S.A., Japan and Poland.

Between 1991 and 1996, the first computerized Superfund trading system was conceptualized and developed by Christian Baha, who is the founder of the group. Superfund strategies trade across 150 global commodity and financial futures markets.

2008 was one of the best years for CTA funds which manage close to US$300 Billion as per Barclay CTA, however subsequent years have been challenging for trend following funds. Christian Baha was ranked 22 on the world's most successful managers in 2008, but his funds were hit particularly hard in the following years. More recently he expanded the investment management team to 55.

Superfund developed a full systematic global equity market neutral strategy which has recently been used in an approved UCITS IV fund authorised for retail distribution in Luxembourg and other European countries.

In June 2010, the firm closed six international offices and laid off staff as part of cost-saving measures.

In March 2022, Austrian Ex-Finance Minister Gernot Blümel became the CEO of the Superfund Group.

== Marketing ==
Superfund promotes its funds by sponsoring cultural institutions like the Viennese Symphony Orchestra and the American Ballet Theatre, sports teams and personalities like World Cup overall champion alpine skier Bode Miller and some other culture sponsorings such as the Albertina. Superfund also sponsored Partizan during their 2003/2004 UEFA Champions League campaign. Superfund has been involved in auto racing, briefly sponsoring the Minardi team in Formula One and attempting to start its own formula racing series. A team owned by Austrian driver Alexander Wurz and backed by Superfund applied an entry for the 2010 Formula One season but it never happened.
