= Jaroslav Janiš =

Czech racing driver (born 1983)

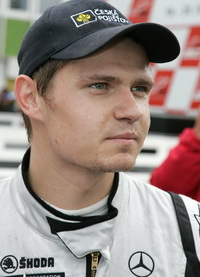
- Janiš in 2008
- Nationality: (Czech Republic) Czech
- Born: 8 July 1983 (age 43) Olomouc, Czechoslovakia
- Categorisation: FIA Gold (until 2016); FIA Silver (2017–)

24 Hours of Le Mans career
- Years: 2007, 2009
- Teams: Spyker Squadron
- Best finish: 25th (2009)
- Class wins: 0

Jaroslav "Jarek" Janiš (born 8 July 1983) is a Czech auto racing driver. In 2006 he is racing in the FIA GT Championship. He has taken three pole positions Brno, Dijon and the Hungaroring turning two of them into victories, teamed with Sascha Bert and occasionally former Formula One driver Andrea Montermini. Prior to 2006, he had done six GT Championship races, four of them in a Ferrari 360 Modena for the Menx team in 2003, taking a total of 17.5 points.

Janiš was born in Olomouc, Czechoslovakia, and has a record in single-seater competition. He finished seventh in the German Formula Ford series in 1999, and was second in that series (and fourth in the European Formula Ford series) a year later. By the end of 2001, he had a chance to fill in for countryman Tomáš Enge in the final round of the International Formula 3000 series at Monza. He finished third overall in the European series in 2002, and raced the international series in 2003. He made his Champ Car debut for Dale Coyne Racing in the penultimate race of 2004. He did some Formula Nippon in Japan in 2005.

Janiš is a former race driver for A1 Team Czech Republic in the A1 Grand Prix series.

Janiš is the older brother of racing driver Erik Janiš.

== Racing record ==
=== Career summary ===
Season	Series	Team	Races	Wins	Poles	F.Laps	Podiums	Points	Position
1999	Formula Ford 1800 Germany	Eiffelland Racing	8	0	1	0	2	80	7th
2000	Formula Ford 1800 Germany	Eiffelland Racing	8	0	1	2	6	120	**2nd**
2000	French Formula Ford Championship	Eiffelland Racing	?	1	?	?	3	80	5th
2000	European Formula Ford Championship	Eiffelland Racing	?	?	?	?	?	?	4th
2000	Formula Palmer Audi Winter Series		4	2	1	0	3	68	**3rd**
2001	FIA International Formula 3000	Coca-Cola Nordic Racing	1	0	0	0	0	0	NC
2001	German Formula Three Championship	Opel Team KMS	11	0	0	0	0	10	22nd
2001	Formula Renault 2000 Eurocup	Eiffelland Racing	4	0	0	0	0	8	25th
2001	Formula Renault 2.0 Germany	Eiffelland Racing	1	0	0	0	0	0	NC
2001	FIA GT Championship- N-GT	Coca-Cola Racing Team	1	0	0	0	0	0	NC
2001	European Le Mans Series - LMP900	Lanesra Racing	1	0	0	0	1	21	17th
2002	Euro Formula 3000	ISR Racing	9	2	3	3	4	36	**3rd**
2003	FIA International Formula 3000	ISR Racing	9	0	0	0	0	20	8th
2003	FIA GT Championship - N-GT	MenX	3	0	0	0	1	17.5	15th
2003	Formula One	Jordan Grand Prix	Test driver						
2004	Deutsche Tourenwagen Masters	Team Rosberg	11	0	0	0	0	0	NC
2004	Champ Car World Series	Dale Coyne Racing	1	0	0	0	0	3	24th
2005	Italian Formula 3000	ma-con	7	1	2	0	5	43	**2nd**
2005	Formula Nippon	Kondō Racing	3	0	0	0	0	0	NC
2005	Le Mans Series - GT1	MenX	3	1	0	1	2	23	6th
2006	F3000 International Masters	Charouz Racing System	6	4	2	?	6	54	**3rd**
2006	FIA GT Championship - GT1	Zakspeed Racing	9	2	4	0	3	57.5	5th
2006–07	A1 Grand Prix	Charouz Racing System	4	0	0	0	0	27	12th
2007	FIA GT Championship - GT2	Scuderia Ecosse	3	0	0	0	1	7	20th
2007	American Le Mans Series - GT2	Spyker Squadron	2	0	0	0	0	17	30th
2007	24 Hours of Le Mans - GT2	Spyker Squadron	1	0	0	0	0	0	NC
2009	Lamborghini Blancpain Super Trofeo - Pro	Lamborghini Racing Eastern Europe	18	0	0	0	5	110	**3rd**
2009	Le Mans Series - GT2	Spyker Squadron	3	0	0	0	2	10	12th
2009	24 Hours of Le Mans - GT2	Spyker Squadron	1	0	0	0	0	0	5th
2010	Lamborghini Blancpain Super Trofeo - Pro	Gravity Charouz Racing	?	0	0	0	0	3	6th
2010	Lamborghini Super Trofeo Europe - Pro	Gravity Charouz Racing	3	0	0	0	0	8	9th
2011	FIA GT3 European Championship	Gravity Charouz Racing	6	0	0	0	1	26	20th
2013	FIA GT Series - Pro-Am	Gravity Charouz Racing	2	0	0	0	0	0	NC
2014	Lamborghini Super Trofeo Europe - Pro-Am		2	0	0	0	0	10	17th
2015	24H Series - A6-Pro	Gravity Charouz Racing	1	0	0	0	0	0	NC
2017	24H Series - A6	Gravity Charouz Racing	1	0	0	0	0	15	NC
2023	24H GT Series - GT4	Buggyra ZM Racing							
2024	24H Series - GT4	Buggyra ZM Racing							

=== Complete Formula Renault 2000 Eurocup results ===
(key) (Races in bold indicate pole position; races in italics indicate fastest lap.)

Year	Entrant	1	2	3	4	5	6	7	8	9	10	DC	Points
2001	Eiffelland Racing	MNZ	BRN; 13	MAG; 9	SIL	ZOL; 9	HUN; 20	A1R	NÜR	JAR	EST	25th	8

=== Complete German Formula Three Championship results ===
(key) (Races in bold indicate pole position; races in italics indicate fastest lap.)

Year	Entrant	Chassis	Engine	1	2	3	4	5	6	7	8	9	10	11	12	13	14	15	16	17	18	19	20	DC	Points
2001	Opel Team KMS	Dallara F301	Opel	HOC1; 1	HOC1; 2	NÜR1; 1	NÜR1; 2	OSC; 1	OSC; 2	SAC; 1	SAC; 2	NOR; 1 DNQ	NOR; 2; 16	HOC2; 1; 17	HOC2; 2; 16	LAU; 1; 12	LAU; 2 Ret	NÜR2; 1; 14	NÜR2; 2; 9	A1R; 1; 11	A1R; 2 Ret	HOC3; 1; 5	HOC3; 2; 11	22nd	10

=== Complete International Formula 3000 results ===
(key) (Races in bold indicate pole position; races in italics indicate fastest lap.)

Year	Entrant	1	2	3	4	5	6	7	8	9	10	11	12	DC	Points
2001	Coca-Cola Nordic Racing	INT	IMO	CAT	A1R	MON	NUR	MAG	SIL	HOC	HUN	SPA	MNZ; 16	NC	0
2003	Superfund ISR - Charouz	IMO; DNS	CAT; 4	A1R; 9	MON; 4	NUR; 6	MAG; Ret	SIL; 10	HOC; 8	HUN; 5	MNZ; 6			8th	20

=== Complete Italian/Euro Formula 3000 results ===
(key) (Races in bold indicate pole position; races in italics indicate fastest lap)

Year	Entrant	1	2	3	4	5	6	7	8	9	DC	Points
2002	Charouz ISR Racing	VLL; Ret	PER; 2	MNZ; 6	**SPA**; Ret	**DON**; 1	BRN; 5	DIJ; 4	JER; 3	**CAG**; 1	**3rd**	**36**
2005	Ma-Con Engineering	ADR	VAL; 2	BRN; Ret	IMO; 3	MUG; 6	MAG; 3	**MNZ**; 2	**MIS**; 1		**2nd**	**43**

=== Complete Deutsche Tourenwagen Masters results ===
(key) (Races in bold indicate pole position) (Races in italics indicate fastest lap)

Year	Team	Car	1	2	3	4	5	6	7	8	9	10	11	Pos	Points
2004	Team Rosberg	AMG-Mercedes C-Klasse 2003	HOC; 13	EST; Ret	ADR; Ret	LAU; 15	NOR; 16†	SHA^{1} 8	NÜR; Ret	OSC; 20†	ZAN; 16	BRN; Ret	HOC; Ret	**21st**	**0**

^{†} - Driver did not finish, but completed 90% of the race distance.
^{1} - A non-championship one-off race was held in 2004 at the streets of Shanghai, China.

=== Complete Champ Car World Series results ===
Year	Team	No.	Chassis	Engine	1	2	3	4	5	6	7	8	9	10	11	12	13	14	Rank	Points	Ref
2004	Dale Coyne Racing	19	Lola B02/00	Ford XFE V8t	LBH	MTY	MIL	POR	CLE	TOR	VAN	ROA	DEN	MTL	LS	LVS	SRF; 16	MXC	**24th**	**3**	

=== Complete Formula Nippon results ===
(key)

Year	Entrant	1	2	3	4	5	6	7	8	9	DC	Points
2005	Kondo Racing	MOT; 12	SUZ; 7	SUG; 7	FUJ	SUZ	MIN	FUJ	MOT	SUZ	14th	0

=== Complete F3000 International Masters results ===
(key) (Races in bold indicate pole position; races in italics indicate fastest lap)

Year	Entrant	1	2	3	4	5	6	7	8	9	10	11	12	13	14	15	16	DC	Points
2006	Charouz Racing System	MNZ; 1; 1	MNZ; 2; 1	**MAG**; **1**; 1	MAG; 2; 2	**BRH**; **1**; 1	BRH; 2; 3	OSC; 1	OSC; 2	BRN; 1	BRN; 2	IST; 1	IST; 2	EST; 1	EST; 2	EST; 3	EST; 4	**3rd**	**54**

=== Complete A1 Grand Prix results ===
(key) (Races in bold indicate pole position) (Races in italics indicate fastest lap)

Year	Entrant	1	2	3	4	5	6	7	8	9	10	11	12	13	14	15	16	17	18	19	20	21	22	DC	Points
2006–07	Czech Republic	NED; SPR	NED; FEA	CZE; SPR; PO	CZE; FEA; PO	CHN; SPR; PO	CHN; FEA; PO	MYS; SPR; PO	MYS; FEA; PO	IDN; SPR; 16	IDN; FEA; 7	NZL; SPR	NZL; FEA	AUS; SPR	AUS; FEA	RSA; SPR	RSA; FEA	MEX; SPR; 12	MEX; FEA; 12	CHN; SPR	CHN; FEA	GBR; SPR	GBR; SPR	12th	27

=== 24 Hours of Le Mans results ===
Year	Team	Co-Drivers	Car	Class	Laps	Pos.	Class Pos.
2007	(Netherlands) Spyker Squadron	(Netherlands) Mike Hezemans (United Kingdom) Jonny Kane	Spyker C8 Spyder GT2-R	GT2	70	DNF	DNF
2009	(Netherlands) Snoras Spyker Squadron	(Netherlands) Tom Coronel (Netherlands) Jeroen Bleekemolen	Spyker C8 Laviolette GT2-R	GT2	320	25th	5th

=== FIA GT Championship results ===
Year	Team	Car	1	2	3	4	5	6	7	8	9	10	Pos	Points
2006	Zakspeed Racing	Saleen S7-R	SIL; 2	**BRN**; 1	OSC; 4	SPA; 8	RIC; 8	**DIJ**; 4	MUG; 4	**HUN**; 1	**ADR**; 11		**3rd**	**58**
2006	Race Alliance	Aston Martin DBR9										DUB; 5	**3rd**	**58**
