= Auto GP =

Auto racing championship in Europe

- Category: Single seaters
- Region: Europe
- Inaugural season: 1999
- Folded: 2016
- Drivers: 9
- Teams: 5
- Constructors: Lola
- Engine suppliers: Zytek
- Tyre suppliers: Kumho Tires
- Last Drivers' champion: (Mexico) Luis Michael Dörrbecker
- Last Teams' champion: (Italy) Torino Squadra Corse

Auto GP, sometimes referred to as the Auto GP World Series and formerly known as both Euro Formula 3000 and the Euroseries 3000, was a European formula racing series.

== History ==
The series' roots can be traced back to 1999 and the Italian Formula 3000 series, organised by Pierluigi Corbari, which used old Lola chassis with Zytek engines. The teams used the Lola T96/50 in the first two years. At the beginning nearly all races were held in Italy, but very quickly the series expanded and had venues in different European countries.

The series became European Formula 3000 in 2001. The next three years (2001–2003) saw the Lola B99/50 in use. For 2004, Superfund became the series' title sponsor, planning to use a new car with a new set of regulations, named Formula Superfund, but the funding was pulled before the 2005 season got under way and the series was cancelled.

For 2005, Coloni Motorsport established an Italian national-level championship, using the Italian Formula 3000 name. In 2006, Coloni expanded this to form a new European championship named Euroseries 3000 with the Lola B02/50. The Italian series continued to run as part of Euroseries races.

In 2009, the organisers announced that the first-generation A1 Grand Prix Lola B05/52 were allowed alongside the Lola F3000 chassis, replacing the old cars completely from 2010.

The championship itself was rebranded for the 2010 season, with it adopting the Auto GP name. As well as that, the championship offered a €200,000 prize fund at each of its six rounds.

2015 marked the start of the Auto GP World Series working with ISRA, a company from the Netherlands who set up the 2014 FA1 Series, this partnership, however, has not lasted long with the Auto GP Organisation announcing at Round 1 (of the 2015 season) that the two companies have parted ways. The 2015 season was "archived" midway through the season and midway through the 2016 season the series merged with the BOSS GP series.

== Results ==
=== Formula 3000 era ===
Season	Champion	Second	Third	Team Champion	Secondary Class Champion
Italian Formula 3000
1999	(Italy) Giorgio Vinella	(South Africa) Werner Lupberger	(Italy) Marco Apicella	(Italy) Team Martello	not awarded
2000	(Brazil) Ricardo Sperafico	(United Kingdom) Warren Hughes	(Italy) Gabriele Lancieri	Arden Team Russia	not awarded
Euro Formula 3000					not awarded
2001	(Brazil) Felipe Massa	(Italy) Thomas Biagi	(Germany) Alex Müller	(Italy) Draco Junior Team	not awarded
2002	(Brazil) Jaime Melo, Jr.	(France) Romain Dumas	(Czech Republic) Jaroslav Janiš	(Italy) Team Great Wall	not awarded
2003	(Brazil) Augusto Farfus	(Italy) Fabrizio del Monte	(Italy) Gianmaria Bruni	(Italy) Draco Junior Team	not awarded
Superfund Euro Formula 3000
2004	(Netherlands) Nicky Pastorelli	(Italy) Fabrizio del Monte	(Austria) Norbert Siedler	(Italy) Draco Junior Team	not awarded
Italian Formula 3000
2005	(Italy) Luca Filippi	(Czech Republic) Jaroslav Janiš	(Italy) Giacomo Ricci	(Italy) FMS International	L: (Italy) Stefano Gattuso
Euroseries 3000
2006	(Italy) Giacomo Ricci	(Italy) Marco Bonanomi	(Russia) Vitaly Petrov	(Italy) FMS International	I: (Italy) Giacomo Ricci
2007	(Italy) Davide Rigon	(Brazil) Diego Nunes	(Brazil) Luiz Razia	(Italy) Minardi by GP Racing	I: (Italy) Davide Rigon
2008	(France) Nicolas Prost	(Italy) Fabio Onidi	(Pakistan) Adam Khan	(Italy) Bull Racing	I: (Colombia) Omar Leal
2009	(United Kingdom) Will Bratt	(Italy) Marco Bonanomi	(Italy) Fabio Onidi	(Italy) FMS International	I: (United Kingdom) Will Bratt

=== Auto GP ===
Season	Champion	Second	Third	Team Champion	Secondary Class Champion
Auto GP
2010	(France) Romain Grosjean	(Italy) Edoardo Piscopo	(United Kingdom) Duncan Tappy	(France) DAMS	U21: (France) Adrien Tambay
2011	(Italy) Kevin Ceccon	(Italy) Luca Filippi	(Russia) Sergey Afanasyev	(France) DAMS	U21: (Italy) Kevin Ceccon
Auto GP World Series
2012	(United Kingdom) Adrian Quaife-Hobbs	(Norway) Pål Varhaug	(Russia) Sergey Sirotkin	(United Kingdom) Super Nova International	U21: (United Kingdom) Adrian Quaife-Hobbs
Auto GP
2013	(Italy) Vittorio Ghirelli	(Japan) Kimiya Sato	(Italy) Sergio Campana	(United Kingdom) Super Nova International	U21: (Italy) Vittorio Ghirelli
2014	(Japan) Kimiya Sato	(Hungary) Tamás Pál Kiss	(Germany) Markus Pommer	(United Kingdom) Super Nova International	not awarded
2015	cancelled				not awarded
Auto GP Formula Open Championship
2016	(Mexico) Luis Michael Dörrbecker	(India) Mahaveer Raghunathan	(Switzerland) Christof von Grünigen	(Italy) Torino Squadra Corse	not awarded

== Scoring system ==
=== Current system ===
Teams only score from their two highest placed cars. 48 points is the maximum possible haul for one driver in a race weekend.

2012 Auto GP points system
Race	1st	2nd	3rd	4th	5th	6th	7th	8th	9th	10th	Pole position	Fastest lap
R1	25	18	15	12	10	8	6	4	2	1	1	1
R2	20	15	12	10	8	6	4	3	2	1		1

=== Previous points systems ===
Previous Auto GP points systems
Years	Race	1st	2nd	3rd	4th	5th	6th	7th	8th	9th	10th	Pole position	Fastest lap
2011	R1	25	18	15	12	10	8	6	4	2	1	1	1
2011	R2	18	13	10	8	6	4	2	1				1
2006–2010	R1	10	8	6	5	4	3	2	1			1	1
2006–2010	R2	6	5	4	3	2	1						1
2005		10	8	6	5	4	3	2	1			1	1
1999–2004		10	6	4	3	2	1						
