= Christian Horner =

British motorsport executive (born 1973)

Christian Horner CBE
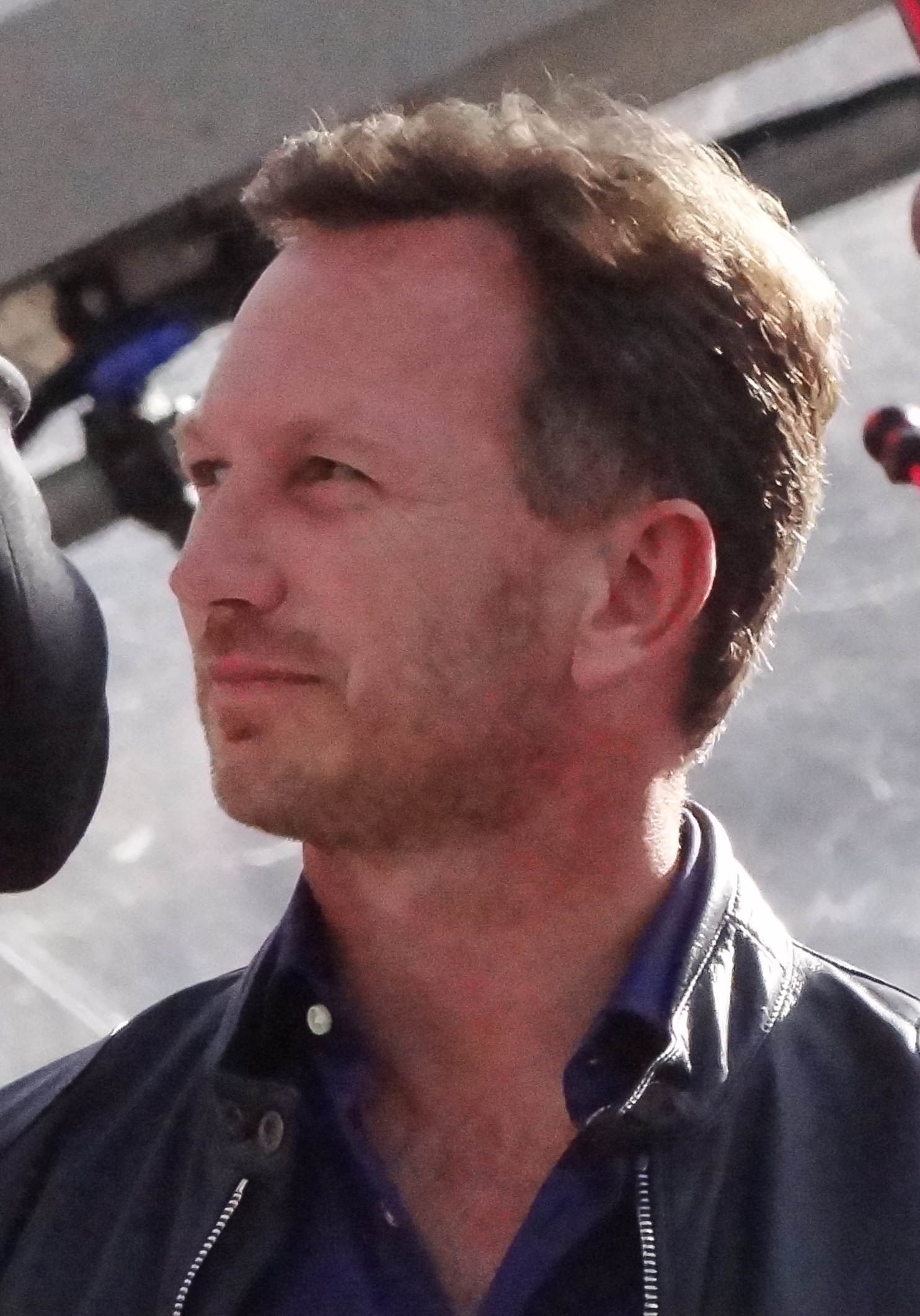
- Horner in 2017
- Born: Christian Edward Johnston Horner; 16 November 1973 (age 52); Leamington Spa, England
- Education: Arnold Lodge School; Warwick School
- Occupations: Motorsport executive; racing driver
- Employers: International F3000; Arden (1997–2004); Formula One; Red Bull (2005–2025)
- Spouse: Geri Halliwell (m. 2015)
- Children: 2

Christian Edward Johnston Horner (born 16 November 1973) is a British former motorsport executive and former racing driver. From 2005 to 2025, Horner served as team principal and CEO of Red Bull in Formula One, winning six World Constructors' Championship titles between 2010 and 2023.

Born and raised in Leamington Spa, Horner began competitive kart racing. His motorsport career started as a racing driver, becoming a race-winner in British Formula Renault before switching to team management as head of International Formula 3000 team Arden International, which he co-founded with his father in 1997. In 2005, he became the youngest team principal in Formula One history, joining the recently established Red Bull project aged 31. Signing Adrian Newey that year and Sebastian Vettel in 2009, Horner built a dynasty that won four consecutive Constructors' and Drivers' titles from 2010 to 2013. Their success later returned with Max Verstappen from 2021 to 2024, further claiming the 2022 and 2023 Constructors' titles—the latter whilst winning a record 21 of 22 Grands Prix.

Across 21 seasons under Horner, Red Bull won six World Constructors' Championships, eight World Drivers' Championships, (Note: Four with Sebastian Vettel (2010–2013) and four with Max Verstappen (2021–2024).) and 124 Grands Prix—the second-most as a team principal in history. He and Red Bull parted company midway through the 2025 season following a downturn in the team's performance, intra-team tensions, high-profile resignations, and allegations of inappropriate behaviour. In September 2025 it was reported that Red Bull and Horner had reached an agreement in the amount of £80 million to settle his outstanding contract.

Horner was appointed an Officer of the Order of the British Empire in the 2013 Birthday Honours and a Commander in the 2024 New Year Honours.

== Early life ==
Christian Edward Johnston Horner was born on 16 November 1973 to a family involved in the car industry; his grandfather worked as purchasing manager at the Standard Motor Company in Coventry, before establishing an agency with Horner's father to supply components to motor manufacturers in the Midlands. Horner was educated at Arnold Lodge School in Leamington Spa, and then Warwick School. He has two brothers, Jamie and Guy.

== Driving career ==
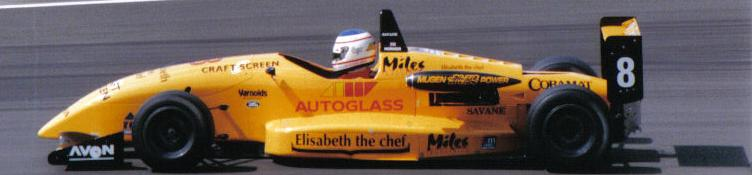
Horner driving for Alan Docking Racing at Silverstone during the 1995 British Formula Three Championship season

Having started his racing career in karts, Horner's career in car racing started after he won a Formula Renault scholarship in 1991. He competed in the 1992 British Formula Renault Championship with Manor Motorsport, finishing that season as a race winner and the highest placed rookie. Horner then moved up to British Formula Three for 1993, finishing second in the Class B Championship for P1 Motorsport and winning five races, before moving to the Fortec and ADR teams in 1994 and 1995, and then to the TOM'S team in 1996. In 1996, he also raced in British Formula Two. Horner moved up to Formula 3000 in 1997, founding the Arden team.

According to Horner, he set the team up with borrowed money, including a loan from his father, and persuaded P1 Motorsport founder Roly Vincini to take on the role of his race engineer. He bought a second-hand trailer for the team from Helmut Marko, who as head of the Red Bull Junior Team was one of Horner's main rivals as a manager in F3000, and with whom he would later work closely at Red Bull. Horner stayed in F3000 for 1998 and was joined at Arden by Kurt Mollekens, who showed good pace and led the championship at one stage. During a pre-season test at Estoril, Horner followed Juan Pablo Montoya through the circuit's high-speed first corner and realised that he was "not capable of replicating the level of commitment" shown by the Colombian driver. As a result, he decided to step back from driving at the conclusion of the season in order to focus on developing the Arden team.

=== Complete International Formula 3000 results ===
(key) (Races in bold indicate pole position) (Races in italics indicate fastest lap)

Year	Entrant	1	2	3	4	5	6	7	8	9	10	11	12	DC	Points
1997	Arden International	SIL; 16	PAU; DNQ	HEL; DNQ	NÜR; DNQ	PER; DNQ	HOC; DNQ	A1R; 16	SPA; DNQ	MUG; 17	JER; 6			21st	1
1998	Arden Racing/KTR	OSC; Ret	IMO; 12	CAT; Ret	SIL; Ret	MON; 16	PAU; DNQ	A1R; 17	HOC; 18	HUN; Ret	SPA; DNQ	PER; 17	NÜR; 17	33rd	0

== Team management ==
After retiring from competitive driving at the age of 25, Horner signed Viktor Maslov and Marc Goossens for the 1999 FIA F3000 season. Before the start of that year, Dave Richards' Prodrive organisation bought a 50 percent stake in Arden on behalf of Russian oil company Lukoil, whose boss was Maslov's father. Horner bought back Prodrive's share in Arden after one season. Darren Manning was signed to replace Goossens for the 2000–2001 season, scoring one pole and two podium finishes. Arden also competed in the Italian F3000 in 2000, winning three races and finishing second in the Championship with Warren Hughes. After parting company with Lukoil, Horner recruited a new driver line-up for 2002 with Tomáš Enge and Björn Wirdheim, who were brought in to replace Manning and Maslov. The team took five victories (four for Enge, one for Wirdheim) and won the Team Championship; Enge won the title that year but was demoted to third after a failed drug test, handing the title to Sébastien Bourdais.

Björn Wirdheim stayed in 2003, with Enge replaced by Townsend Bell. Wirdheim won the title by a 35-point margin to second-placed Ricardo Sperafico. Arden retained the Team Championship. The final season of F3000, 2004, was dominated by Arden's lead driver Vitantonio Liuzzi; the support of Robert Doornbos helped to secure both the Drivers' and Constructors' Championship titles by a large margin. The team won eight of the ten championship rounds that year, with Liuzzi taking seven and Doornbos winning one. Liuzzi was brought to the team by his manager, Helmut Marko, with sponsorship from Red Bull.

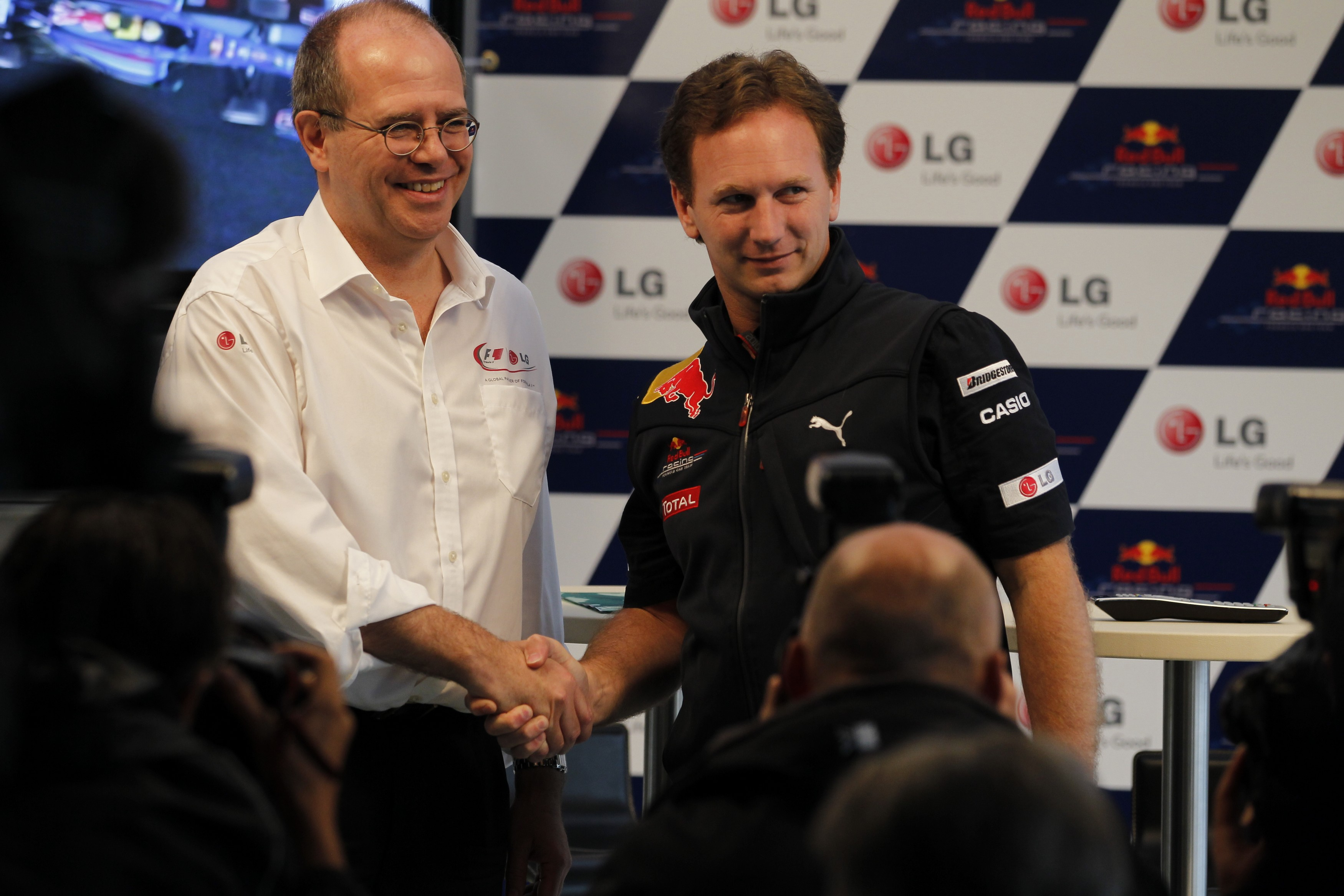
Horner (right) with then-chief marketing officer of LG Electronics, Dermot Boden (left), in 2010

By 2004, Horner based his Arden International Team at Prodrive premises in Banbury, before relocating them to the former 22 Motorsport facility close by. He was looking for an opportunity to move into Formula One. Discussions with Eddie Jordan regarding buying Jordan Grand Prix came to nothing due to disagreements over costs. In November 2004, the Austrian energy drink company Red Bull purchased Jaguar F1 Team, which became Red Bull Racing. In January 2005, Horner was appointed to head the team, becoming the youngest team principal at the time. Despite being appointed only eight weeks before the season-opening Australian Grand Prix, the team got off to a good start under his stewardship, with drivers David Coulthard and Christian Klien finishing fourth and seventh in Australia, and they went on to score a total of 34 points for the team compared to the nine taken by Jaguar the previous year. Horner also played a key role in recruiting Adrian Newey, who was announced as the team's chief technical officer in November 2005.

2006 was a transitional year: by the time Newey started work at Red Bull in February 2006, that year's car (the RB2) had already been designed, and the team switched from Cosworth to customer Ferrari engines, which overheated and were unreliable. However, the team did take its first podium finish at the Monaco Grand Prix, where Horner jumped into a swimming pool wearing nothing but a Superman cape to celebrate. 2007 brought the RB3, the team's first Newey-designed car, and the arrival of Mark Webber and Renault engines; however, the team continued to suffer from problems with reliability, with the car enduring 14 retirements and scoring a single podium, while the team dropped down to seventh in the Constructors' Championship the following year.

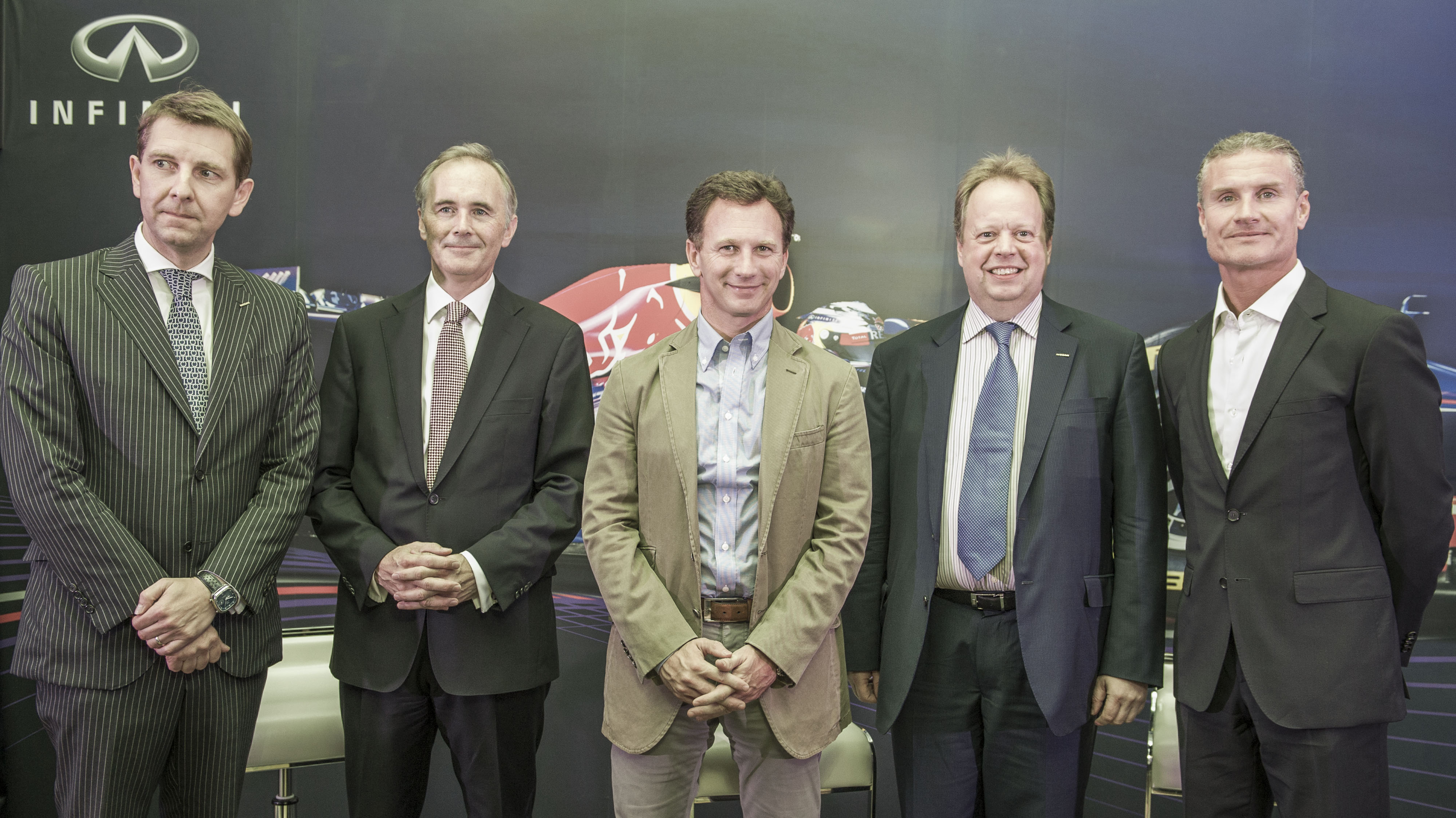
Horner (centre) in 2013. Left to right: Simon Sproule (then-corporate vice president of global marketing communications at Nissan), Tim Hitchens (then-British Ambassador to Japan), Horner, Andy Palmer (then-chairman of Infiniti), and David Coulthard (a former F1 driver).

The team finished a strong second in the 2009 Constructors' Championship, with drivers Sebastian Vettel and Mark Webber finishing second and fourth respectively in the drivers' title race and taking six wins between them. In 2010, the team won their first Constructors' Championship with one race to spare, and Sebastian Vettel won the Drivers' Championship at the final race of the season, becoming the youngest World Champion. At the age of 35, Horner was the second youngest team principal to win a Formula 1 Constructors' Championship, Colin Chapman being the youngest after clinching the 1963 Constructors' Championship aged 34.

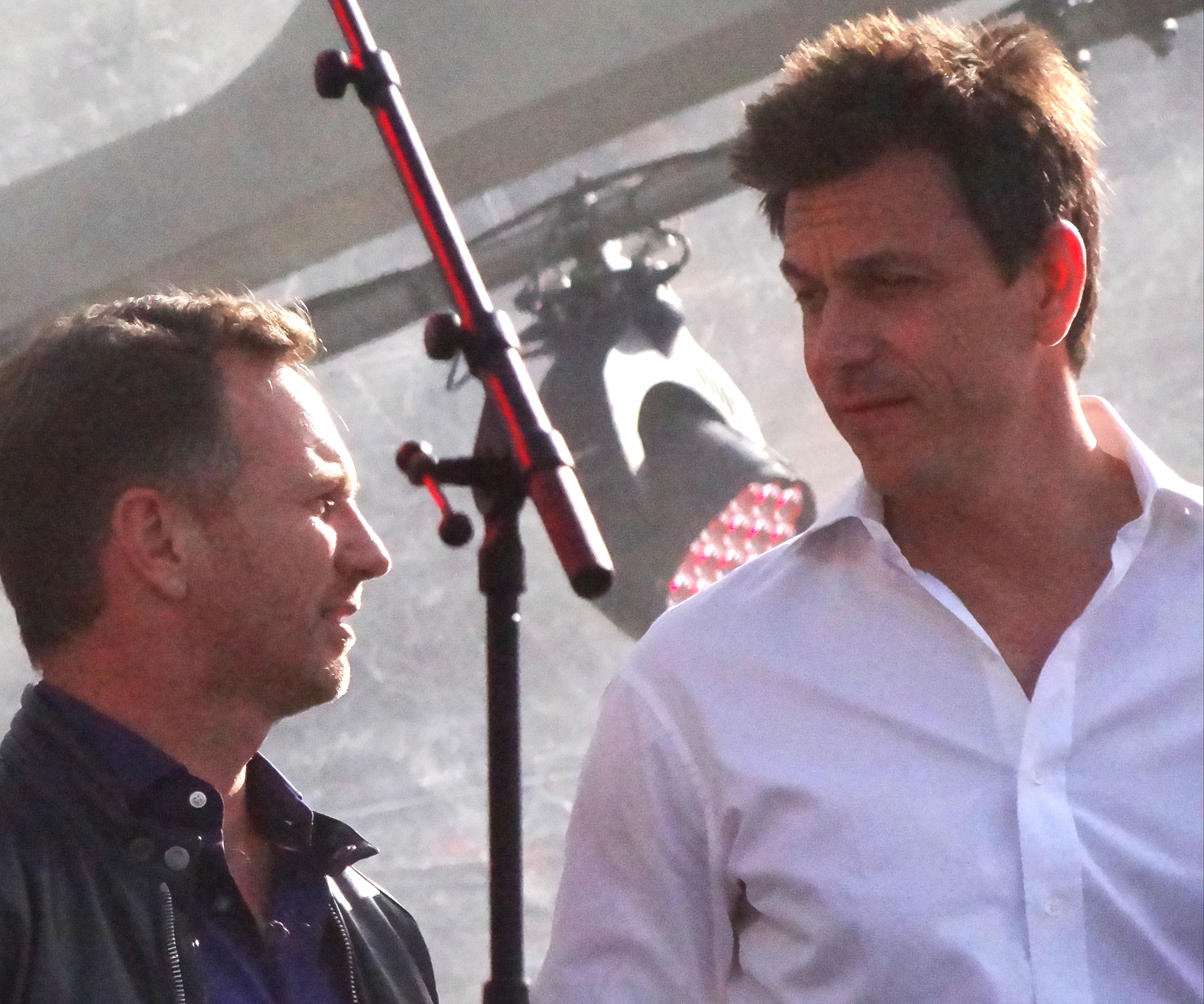
Horner with Mercedes F1 team principal Toto Wolff at F1 Live in Trafalgar Square, London.

In 2011, the team won their second Constructors' Championship with three races to spare, with Sebastian Vettel becoming the world's youngest double-champion. In 2012, the team won their third Constructors' Championship with one race to spare. Vettel became the world's youngest triple World Champion. In 2013, Red Bull Racing won its fourth consecutive F1 Constructors' Championship as Vettel won his fourth Drivers' Championship. In 2021, Red Bull Racing finished second in the F1 Constructors' Championship with drivers Sergio Pérez and Max Verstappen. Verstappen won his maiden F1 Drivers' Championship at the final race of the season. In 2022, Red Bull Racing won the F1 Constructors' Championship with drivers Pérez and Verstappen. Verstappen also won the F1 Drivers' Championship while Pérez placed third. In 2023, Red Bull Racing kept the same driver line-up and won the F1 Constructors' Championship for a sixth time. Max Verstappen won his third F1 Drivers' Championship whilst Sergio Pérez finished second. This was the first time that Red Bull Racing had its drivers finish 1–2 in the Drivers' Championship.

On 9 July 2025, Horner was relieved of his duties as team principal and CEO of Red Bull Racing following the British Grand Prix. His departure came at a time when Red Bull's performance had taken a significant downturn compared to previous seasons and had seen numerous high-profile figures leaving the team over the preceding year. Verstappen openly expressed frustrations with the car and performance-related exit clauses in his contract were close to being triggered. Laurent Mekies, former Racing Bulls team principal, replaced Horner as CEO and team principal. On 22 September, Horner officially left the Red Bull team after reportedly agreeing to a pre-tax severance deal of £80 million.

Across 21 seasons under Horner, Red Bull amassed six World Constructors' Championships, eight World Drivers' Championships, 124 Grand Prix wins, 107 pole positions, and 287 podium finishes.

=== Allegations of inappropriate behaviour ===
On 5 February 2024, Red Bull confirmed that Horner was facing an investigation following allegations of inappropriate behaviour towards a female colleague. The investigation, which Red Bull stated it was taking "extremely seriously", was conducted by an external lawyer. Horner was cleared of all wrongdoing on 28 February, maintaining his roles at Red Bull Racing. The specific nature of the allegations was not officially disclosed and the report remained confidential. The following day, an anonymous email titled "Christian Horner investigation evidence" was sent to F1 journalists with a Google Drive link that contained alleged WhatsApp chats between Horner and the complainant. In March 2025 it was reported that the UK court had imposed reporting restrictions at the request of one of the parties, with the complainant's employment action being scheduled to commence in January 2026.

== Team achievements ==
=== Formula 1 – Red Bull Racing ===
Formula One World Constructors' Champions (6) – 2010, 2011, 2012, 2013, 2022, 2023
Formula One World Drivers' Champions (8):

- Sebastian Vettel – 2010, 2011, 2012, 2013
- Max Verstappen – 2021, 2022, 2023, 2024

=== International Formula 3000 ===
Teams Championships (3) – 2002, 2003, 2004
Drivers Championships (2):

- Björn Wirdheim – 2003
- Vitantonio Liuzzi – 2004

=== Italian Formula 3000 ===
Teams Championships – 2000

=== Formula Renault 3.5 ===
Teams Championship – 2016

=== GP3 ===
Drivers Championships (2):

- Mitch Evans – 2012
- Daniil Kvyat – 2013

=== British Formula 4 Championship ===
Teams Championship – 2018

== Personal life ==
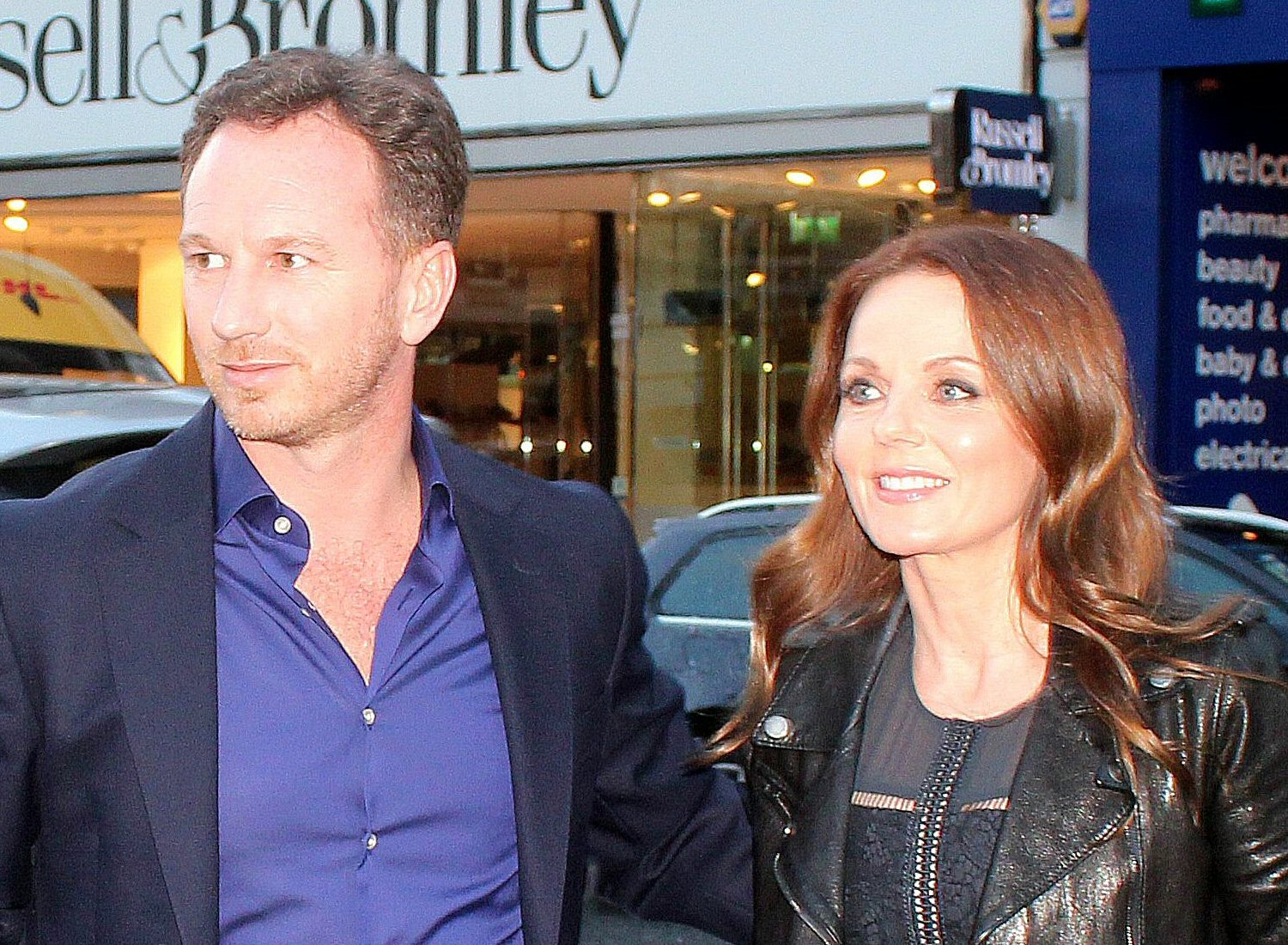
Horner with his wife, Geri Halliwell, in London in July 2016

Horner was in a relationship with Beverley Allen from 1999 to 2013, with Allen giving birth to a daughter in October 2013. Horner and Allen separated in the following months. On 30 July 2025, Allen died from eye cancer, aged 58.

Horner and Spice Girls member Geri Halliwell announced their engagement on 11 November 2014 and were married on 15 May 2015 in Woburn, Bedfordshire. Their son was born in January 2017. Horner is stepfather to her daughter from her previous relationship with screenwriter Sacha Gervasi.

Horner is a Coventry City F.C. supporter.

== Honours ==
Horner was appointed Officer of the Order of the British Empire (OBE) in the 2013 Birthday Honours for services to motorsport. He was appointed Commander of the Order of the British Empire (CBE) in the 2024 New Year Honours for services to motorsport.
