= 1999 Italian Formula 3000 Championship =

The 1999 Italian Formula 3000 Championship was contested over 7 rounds. 16 different teams and 27 different drivers competed. In this one-make formula all teams had to utilize Lola T96/50 chassis with Zytek engines.

The scoring system for this season was 10-6-4-3-2-1 points awarded to the first six classified finishers.

== Entries ==
Team	No.	Driver	Rounds
(Italy) Sighinolfi	0	(Italy) Oliver Martini	3
(Italy) Sighinolfi	2	(Italy) Gabriele Lancieri	All
(United Kingdom) Edenbridge Racing	3	(South Africa) Werner Lupberger	All
(United Kingdom) Edenbridge Racing	4	(Indonesia) Ananda Mikola	All
(Italy) Team Martello	5	(Italy) Giorgio Vinella	All
(Italy) Team Martello	6	(Colombia) Giandomenico Brusatin	All
(Italy) Durango Formula	7	(Poland) Jarosław Wierczuk	All
(Italy) Durango Formula	8	(Italy) Paolo Montin	All
(Italy) Durango Formula	23	(Argentina) Nicolás Filiberti	3-7
(Italy) ADM Competition	9	(Italy) Cesare Manfredini	1-3
(Italy) ADM Competition	9	(Greece) Nikolaus Stremmenos	5-7
(Italy) Coloni Motorsport	10	(Brazil) Marcelo Battistuzzi	3-5
(Italy) Coloni Motorsport	10	(Denmark) Kristian Kolby	7
(Italy) Coloni Motorsport	11	(Spain) Polo Villaamil	1, 3-5
(Italy) Coloni Motorsport	11	(United Kingdom) Dino Morelli	6-7
(United Kingdom) Redgrave Racing	12	(United Kingdom) Mark Shaw	All
(United Kingdom) Redgrave Racing	14	(United Kingdom) Darren Turner	1
(United Kingdom) Redgrave Racing	14	(Brazil) Marcelo Battistuzzi	2, 6-7
(United Kingdom) Redgrave Racing	14	(France) Jean de Pourtales	4-5
(Italy) First GP	15	(Italy) Riccardo Moscatelli	1-4
(Italy) First GP	15	(Italy) Fabrizio Gollin	6-7
Monaco Motorsport	16	(Italy) Marco Apicella	All
Monaco Motorsport	17	(Malaysia) Alex Yoong	3-7
(United Kingdom) Redman Bright	19	(Spain) Rafael Sarandeses	4
(Italy) Team Ghinzani	19	(Italy) Paolo Ruberti	7
(Italy) Draco Racing	20	(Italy) Oliver Martini	5
(Italy) Draco Racing	20	(Austria) Walter Thimmler	7
(United Kingdom) Arden	22	(Russia) Viktor Maslov	4, 7
(Italy) GP Racing	24	(Italy) Thomas Biagi	5-7

== Calendar ==
All races were held in Italy, excepting Donington Park round which held in the United Kingdom.

Round	Circuit/Location	Date	Laps	Distance	Time	Speed
1	ACI Vallelunga Circuit	6 June	32	3.228=103.296 km	0'35:42.203	173.590 km/h
2	Autodromo Nazionale Monza	27 June	25	5.770=144.25 km	0'44:17.382	195.418 km/h
3	Autodromo di Pergusa	18 July	25	4.950=123.75 km	0'39:22.365	188.582 km/h
4	Donington Park	8 August	34	3.150=107.1 km	0'46:59.700	136.738 km/h
5	Misano Circuit	5 September	24	4.060=97.44 km	0'34:16.140	170.603 km/h
6	Misano Circuit	3 October	25	4.060=101.5 km	0'35:57.109	169.393 km/h
7	Autodromo Enzo e Dino Ferrari	24 October	21	4.93=103.53 km	0'41:25.182	149.972 km/h

== Results ==
Round	Circuit	Pole position	Fastest lap	Winner	Winning team
1	(Italy) ACI Vallelunga Circuit	(Spain) Polo Villaamil	(Italy) Marco Apicella	(Italy) Marco Apicella	(Italy) Monaco Motorsport
2	(Italy) Autodromo Nazionale Monza	(Brazil) Marcelo Battistuzzi	(Brazil) Marcelo Battistuzzi	(Brazil) Marcelo Battistuzzi	(United Kingdom) Redgrave Racing
3	(Italy) Autodromo di Pergusa	(Indonesia) Ananda Mikola	(Italy) Oliver Martini	(Italy) Giorgio Vinella	(Italy) Team Martello
4	(United Kingdom) Donington Park	(United Kingdom) Mark Shaw	(Spain) Polo Villaamil	(South Africa) Werner Lupberger	(United Kingdom) Edenbridge Racing
5	(Italy) Misano Circuit	(Italy) Thomas Biagi	(Italy) Marco Apicella	(Italy) Marco Apicella	(Italy) Monaco Motorsport
6	(Italy) Misano Circuit	(Italy) Marco Apicella	(Italy) Marco Apicella	(Italy) Giorgio Vinella	(Italy) Team Martello
7	(Italy) Autodromo Enzo e Dino Ferrari	(United Kingdom) Dino Morelli	(Italy) Fabrizio Gollin	(United Kingdom) Dino Morelli	(Italy) Coloni Motorsport

Note

Race 3 Pole Position originally won by Oliver Martini, but all his times were cancelled and he started from last grid position.

Race 3 original first finisher and winner Ananda Mikola, but he was disqualified due to an illegal positioning of the datalogger.

== Championships standings ==
Pos	Driver	VLL (Italy)	MNZ (Italy)	PER (Italy)	DON (United Kingdom)	MIS (Italy)	MIS (Italy)	IMO (Italy)	Pts
1	(Italy) Giorgio Vinella	4	2	1	Ret	5	1	9	31
2	(South Africa) Werner Lupberger	6	3	6	1	3	2	6	27
3	(Italy) Marco Apicella	1	Ret	Ret	8	1	11	Ret	20
4	(Italy) Thomas Biagi					2	3	2	16
5	(Brazil) Marcelo Battistuzzi		1	11	4	11	14	13	13
6	(United Kingdom) Dino Morelli						4	1	13
7	(Italy) Gabriele Lancieri	9	9	3	3	10	5	4	13
8	(United Kingdom) Mark Shaw	7	4	2	Ret	12	16	NC	9
9	(Italy) Paolo Montin	2	Ret	8	Ret	4	13	10	9
10	(Malaysia) Alex Yoong			5	2	9	15	Ret	8
11	(Spain) Polo Villaamil	3		9	Ret	Ret			4
12	(Indonesia) Ananda Mikola	5	8	DSQ	DNS	6	6	Ret	4
13	(Italy) Paolo Ruberti							3	4
14	(Italy) Oliver Martini			4		7			3
15	(Italy) Cesare Manfredini	13	5	10					2
16	(Colombia) Giandomenico Brusatin	12	7	7	5	Ret	12	Ret	2
17	(Denmark) Kristian Kolby							5	2
18	(Italy) Riccardo Moscatelli	10	6	Ret	Ret				1
19	(Russia) Viktor Maslov				6			8	1
-	(Italy) Fabrizio Gollin						7	7	0
-	(Poland) Jarosław Wierczuk	13	Ret	Ret	7	13	9	12	0
-	(Argentina) Nicolás Filiberti			Ret	Ret	8	8	NC	0
-	(United Kingdom) Darren Turner	8							0
-	(Spain) Rafael Sarandeses				9				0
-	(Greece) Nikolaus Stremmenos					15	10	11	0
-	(France) Jean de Pourtales				Ret	14			0
-	(Austria) Walter Thimmler							Ret	0
Pos	Driver	VLL (Italy)	MNZ (Italy)	PER (Italy)	DON (United Kingdom)	MIS (Italy)	MIS (Italy)	IMO (Italy)	Pts

Colour	Result
Gold	Winner
Silver	Second place
Bronze	Third place
Green	Points classification
Blue	Non-points classification
Blue	Non-classified finish (NC)
Purple	Retired, not classified (Ret)
Red	Did not qualify (DNQ)
Red	Did not pre-qualify (DNPQ)
Black	Disqualified (DSQ)
White	Did not start (DNS)
White	Withdrew (WD)
White	Race cancelled (C)
Blank	Did not practice (DNP)
Blank	Did not arrive (DNA)
Blank	Excluded (EX)
