= Dino Morelli =

British racing driver

- Nationality: British
- Born: 6 June 1973 (age 53) Ballymoney, Northern Ireland

Formula 3000
- Years active: 1995-2001
- Teams: Team Astromega; World Racing Team; Coloni Motorsport; Auto Sport Racing; DKS Racing; Omegaland
- Starts: 17
- Wins: 0
- Poles: 0
- Fastest laps: 0
- Best finish: 12th in 1997

Dino Morelli (born 6 June 1973), is a former racing driver who competed sporadically in Formula 3000 between 1995 and 2001.

== Career ==
Morelli began racing in karts in the late 1980s before joining Irish Formula Ford in 1990, and later British Formula Ford in 1991. By 1994, he was racing in British Formula 3 where he finished seventh in the championship. He joined Omegaland to compete in the first two rounds of the 1995 International Formula 3000 season. He retired from both races. In 1996, he joined Coloni to race in Italian Formula 3, before returning to Formula 3000 in 1997. Driving for DKS Racing, Morelli's season started well, finishing fifth in the opening race at Silverstone. He would secure his first, and only, Formula 3000 podium at Helsinki. At the next round in Germany, Morelli was involved in a major accident with Gareth Rees and Cyril Sauvage, which saw his car launched over the barriers. Morelli was airlifted to hospital, suffering lacerations on the face and complex fractures to his feet. He did not race again in 1997, but did finish in 12th position in the championship.

In 1998, Morelli returned to the Formula 3000 and completed four races with a best finish of 8th at Monaco. In 1999, he represented Coloni Motorsport in both International F3000 and Italian Formula 3000. In Italy, Morelli completed two races, finishing fourth at Misano and winning the final round of the season at Imola. Scoring thirteen points, he finished sixth overall in Italian F3000 that season. In International F3000, his best result was tenth at Spa.

As he headed into 2000, Morelli completed two International F3000 races for WRT and Durango. Alongside this, he also raced in the Sports Racing World Cup, completing three rounds. At Donington Park, he won with team mate Richard Lyons. In 2001, he completed five races for Team Astromega with a best finish of seventh place. He retired from both the Monaco and British rounds of the championship after crashes.

== Racing record ==
=== Career summary ===
Season	Series	Team	Races	Wins	Poles	F.Laps	Podiums	Points	Position
1990	Formula Ford Festival	?	1	0	0	0	0	0	22nd
1991	British Formula Ford Championship	Fulmar	?	2	?	?	?	157	4th
1992	Formula Opel Lotus Euroseries	?	?	0	0	0	0	0	NC
1993	British Formula Three Championship	P1 Engineering	2	0	0	0	0	0	NC
1993	Formula Opel Lotus Euroseries	David Sears Motorsport	?	1	0	0	0	0	NC
1994	British Formula Three Championship	P1 Engineering	15	0	0	0	1	63	9th
1994	Macau Grand Prix	P1 Engineering	1	0	0	0	0	0	11th
1995	International Formula 3000	Omegaland	2	0	0	0	0	0	NC
1996	Italian Formula Three Championship	Coloni Motorsport	5	0	0	0	0	9	12th
1997	International Formula 3000	DKS Racing	4	0	0	0	1	6	12th
1997	British Formula 3000	DKS Racing	1	1	1	1	1	0	NC
1998	International Formula 3000	Auto Sport Racing	4	0	0	0	0	0	NC
1999	International Formula 3000	Coloni Motorsport	1	0	0	0	0	0	NC
1999	Italian Formula 3000	Coloni Motorsport	2	1	1	0	1	13	5th
2000	International Formula 3000	World Racing Team	1	0	0	0	0	0	NC
2000	Italian Formula 3000	Durango	1	0	0	0	0	0	NC
2000	Sports Racing World Cup - SR2	Tampolli Engineering	2	0	1	0	1	17	27th
2001	International Formula 3000	Team Astromega	5	0	0	0	0	0	NC

=== Complete International Formula 3000 results ===
(key) (Races in bold indicate pole position; races in italics indicate fastest lap.)

Year	Entrant	Chassis	Engine	1	2	3	4	5	6	7	8	9	10	11	12	Pos.	Pts
1995	Omegaland	Reynard 95D	Zytek-Judd	SIL; Ret	CAT; Ret	PAU	PER	HOC	SPA	EST	MAG					NC	0
1997	DKS Racing	Lola T96/50	Zytek-Judd	SIL; 5	PAU; 11	HEL; 3	NÜR; 24	PER	HOC	A1R	SPA	MUG	JER			12th	6
1998	Auto Sport Racing	Lola T96/50	Zytek-Judd	OSC	IMO; Ret	CAT; 19	SIL; 10	MON; 8	PAU	A1R	HOC	HUN	SPA	PER	NÜR	28th	0
1999	Coloni Motorsport	Lola T99/50	Zytek	IMO	MON	CAT	MAG	SIL	A1R	HOC	HUN	SPA; 10	NÜR; DNQ			NC	0
2000	World Racing Team	Lola T99/50	Zytek	IMO	SIL	CAT	NÜR	MON	MAG	A1R; DNQ	HOC; Ret	HUN	SPA			NC	0
2001	Team Astromega	Lola T99/50	Zytek	INT	IMO	CAT	A1R; 7	MON; Ret	NÜR; 22	MAG; 20	SIL; Ret	HOC	HUN	SPA	MNZ	21st	0

== Personal life ==
Morelli is based in Portrush and runs a successful business. His family were the founders of the Morelli's ice cream parlour business in Northern Ireland.
