= Arden International =

British racecar team

(United Kingdom) Arden International (Note: In 2005–2009 the team competed under Dutch racing license in GP2 Series.In 2010–2013 the team competed in GP3 Series as MW Arden under Australian racing license.)
- Founded: 1997
- Founder(s): Christian Horner; Garry Horner
- Base: Banbury, Oxfordshire, England
- Team principal(s): Richard Dent; Ben Salter; Jack Woodhouse
- Current series: GB3 Championship; GB4 Championship
- Former series: FIA Formula 2 Championship; GP2 Series; GP3 Series; Formula V8 3.5; GP2 Asia Series; Formula 3000; Italian Formula 3000; A1 Grand Prix; Formula Renault Eurocup; Formula Regional European Championship
- Current drivers: GB3 Championship; 26. TBA; 27. (United Kingdom) Leon Wilson; GB4 Championship; 22. (United States) William Rohan; 24. (Singapore) Michael Koh; 95. (France) Solenn Amrouche
- Noted drivers: (United Kingdom) Christian Horner (Sweden) Björn Wirdheim (Germany) Michael Ammermüller (United Kingdom) Sebastian Priaulx (Portugal) António Félix da Costa (Switzerland) Sébastien Buemi (United Kingdom) Jack Aitken (France) Tom Dillmann (United States) Alexander Rossi (Canada) Nicholas Latifi (United Kingdom) Jake Dennis (France) Norman Nato (France) Pierre Gasly (Italy) Edoardo Mortara (Australia) Jack Doohan (New Zealand) Mitch Evans (Spain) Carlos Sainz Jr. (Norway) Dennis Hauger (Brazil) Bruno Senna (France) Charles Pic (Switzerland) Neel Jani (Mexico) Sergio Pérez (Italy) Vitantonio Liuzzi (United Kingdom) Jolyon Palmer (Germany) Maximilian Günther (Portugal) Filipe Albuquerque (Russia) Daniil Kvyat (Australia) Oscar Piastri (United Kingdom) Jann Mardenborough (France) Sacha Fenestraz (United Kingdom) Dan Ticktum (Switzerland) Patric Niederhauser (Finland) Heikki Kovalainen
- Teams' Championships: Italian Formula 3000: 2000; International Formula 3000: 2002, 2003, 2004; Formula V8 3.5: 2016; F4 British Championship: 2018
- Drivers' Championships: International Formula 3000: 2003: Björn Wirdheim; 2004: Vitantonio Liuzzi; GP3 Series: 2012: Mitch Evans; 2013: Daniil Kvyat
- Website: https://www.arden-motorsport.com/

Arden International, competing as Arden Motorsport, is a multiple formula racing team created and run by Christian Horner and Garry Horner. It currently competes in the GB3 and GB4 Championship, and formerly ran in the FIA Formula 2 Championship and the Formula Regional European Championship.

It has been competing since 1997 and has raced in the Formula 3000 International Championship, the Italian Formula 3000 series, and the A1 GP series for Great Britain.

Due to the Arden's strong business connections and sponsorship, the team often signs Red Bull Junior Team drivers as a way to pave forward future F1 drivers. Many drivers have been Red Bull Juniors, including Michael Ammermüller, Neel Jani, Filipe Albuquerque, Sébastien Buemi, António Félix da Costa, Daniil Kvyat, Carlos Sainz, Jr., Dan Ticktum, Jack Doohan and Dennis Hauger.

== History ==
=== Formula 3000 ===
The team was initially created as a vehicle to enable Christian Horner to race in F3000 in 1997. According to Horner he set the team up with borrowed money, including a loan from his father, and persuaded P1 Motorsport founder Roly Vincini (whom Horner had driven for in his first season of F3) to take on the role of his race engineer. He bought a second-hand trailer for the team from Helmut Marko, who as head of the Red Bull Junior Team was one of Horner's main rivals as a manager in F3000, and whom he later worked closely with at Red Bull. He stayed in F3000 for 1998 and was joined at Arden by Kurt Mollekens, who showed good pace and led the championship at one stage. In the winter of 1998 family friend David Richards had been approached by Russian oil company Lukoil to enable them to enter motorsports sponsorship. As entries to F3000 were restricted, Richards agreed a deal with Horner that Prodrive would take a 50% stake in Arden, in return for Horner becoming team manager. As a result, the team signed Viktor Maslov as a driver under the Lukoil deal from 1999. The team started off poorly, and didn't have the pace to qualify for many races.

At the end of 1999, Richards sold a stake in Prodrive to Apax Partners, who didn't want to continue in F3000. Horner hence exercised the option to buy back the Prodrive stake. As the years went on, the team began to reap the results and was the best team of Formula 3000 in its last 3 years, showing new talents to motorsport world like Darren Manning, Tomáš Enge, Björn Wirdheim and Vitantonio Liuzzi.

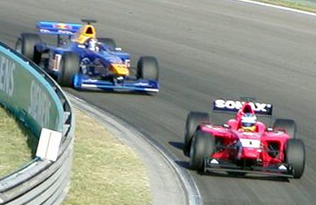
Björn Wirdheim in 2003 racing at Hungary

The team won the Teams' Championship in 2002, 2003 and 2004. During those years, Wirdheim won the drivers championship in 2003, and Liuzzi won it in 2004.

During the teams 8 years in the series, it has scored 359 points, won 16 races and achieved 20 pole positions.

=== Italian Formula 3000 ===
The team joined the Italian Formula 3000 series for 1999 and 2000. Their first season was poor with only one point to their name, but the 2000 season went significantly better, with Warren Hughes taking two wins, one pole position and three fastest laps for the team, and Darren Manning taking one win, one pole and one fastest lap too. The team finished with Hughes second in the championship, and the team winning it outright 51 points.

=== A1 GP ===
Arden operated A1 Team Great Britain in the first season of the A1GP series for 2005–2006. The team fared well in their first season, collecting 8 podium finishes and a single pole position, leaving the team 3rd in the championship with 97 points overall.

=== GP2 ===
In 2005, the F3000 series was rebranded as the GP2 Series, Arden stayed on for the new series and achieved second place in the teams' championship with Heikki Kovalainen and Nicolas Lapierre, and second place in the Drivers' Championship with Kovalainen, who had 5 wins, 4 pole positions and a fastest lap to his name.

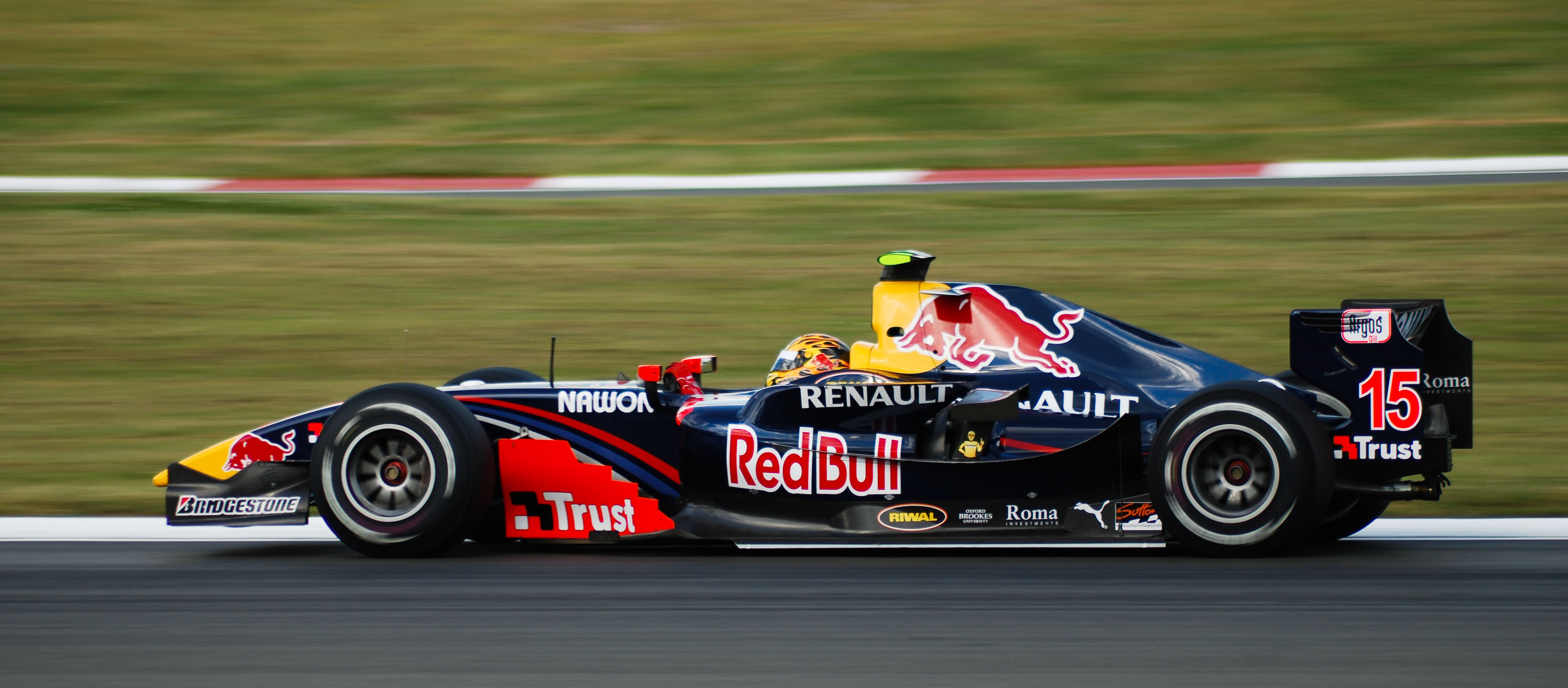
Yelmer Buurman driving at Silverstone.

In 2006, Arden competed in GP2 with Lapierre and the rookie Michael Ammermüller (Neel Jani acted as a substitute for Lapierre when the latter was injured in the race at Monaco). This year, Arden suffered a significant drop in performance, and had only 57 points to show and a single win from Ammermüller, compared to the previous season's 126. Overall the team came fourth in the championship.

For 2007, Arden signed Bruno Senna, nephew of triple F1 champion Ayrton Senna, and A1 Team South Africa driver Adrian Zaugg. Zaugg was replaced for the final round of the season by Filipe Albuquerque. This season was even worse for the team compared to the previous year, only managing 42 points which resulted in a seventh-placed finish in the teams' championship, with Senna finishing ninth overall in the drivers' championship.

For 2008 and the newly founded Asia Series, the team was renamed Trust Team Arden, after its Dutch title sponsor Trust. The duo of Red Bull Junior Team driver Sébastien Buemi and Yelmer Buurman was its race line-up for both championships. For the Asia Series, Adam Khan raced for the first two rounds before being replaced by Buurman. The overall result in the Asia Series was the team finishing second in the championship, with 50 points and one win, and Buemi finishing second in the drivers' championship. Mid-season in the main series, Buurman was replaced by ART Grand Prix outcast Luca Filippi. The season went slightly better than the previous one with the team picking up 50 points, enough to take sixth place, and Buemi picked up two race victories to finish sixth overall in the drivers' championship.

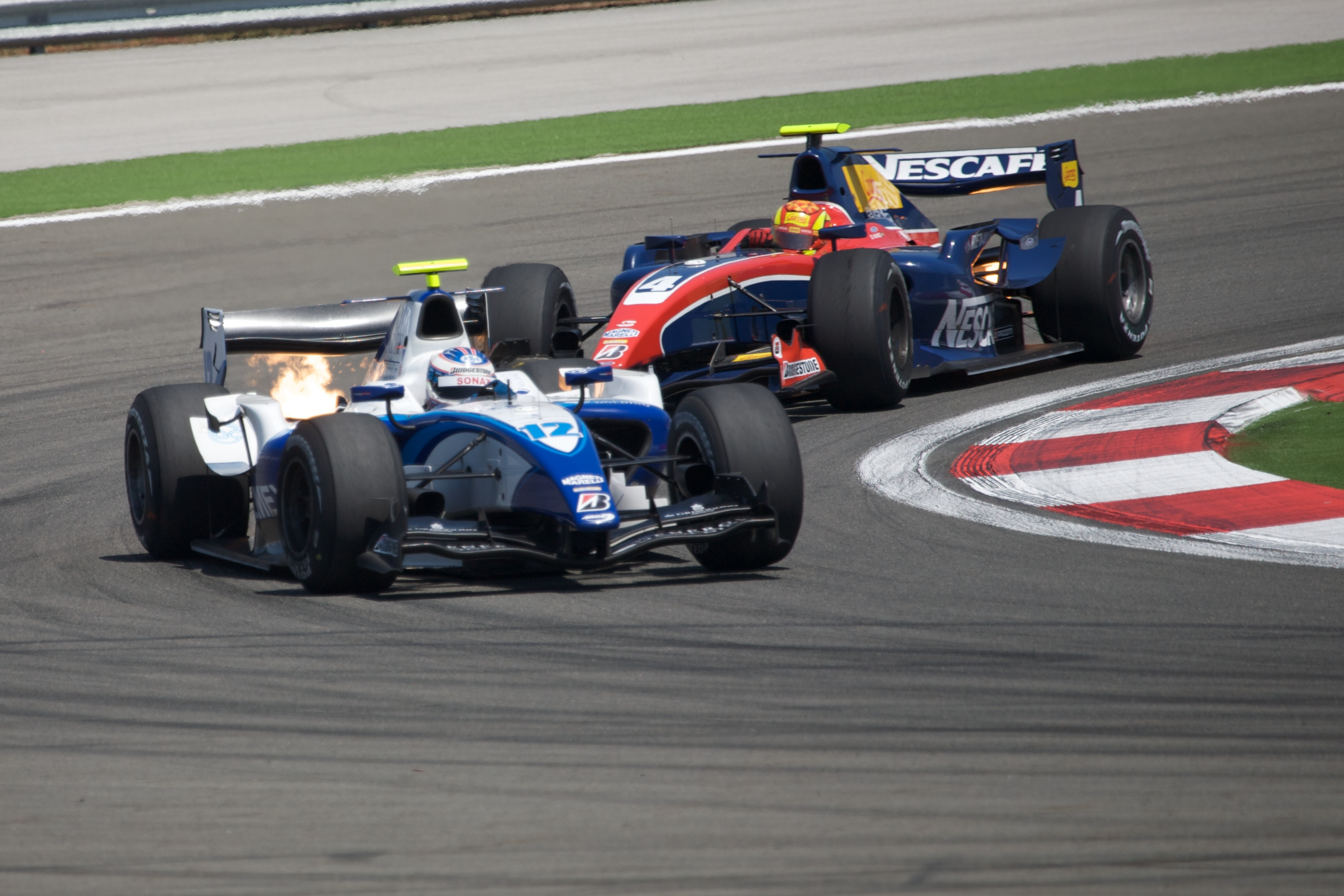
Mortara leading at the race in Turkey

Arden again took part in the Asia Series for the 2008–09 season, signing Luiz Razia and Mika Mäki. For the second round of the championship, held at the Dubai Autodrome, Mäki was replaced by Renger van der Zande, who was subsequently replaced for the rest of the season by Edoardo Mortara. Razia scored the team's only win of the campaign, which allowed Arden to finish sixth in the teams' championship. For the 2009 main Series, the team signed F3 frontrunners Sergio Pérez and Mortara. This was also another poor season for the team, as it finished well down the order in eighth place overall with only Mortara managing a single win.

For the 2009–10 Asia Series, Arden signed Charles Pic and Rodolfo González. After the first round, González was replaced by Javier Villa for the rest of the season. This was the team's most successful outing in the Asia Series, with an end result of 37 points and second in the teams' championship. Villa finished fourth overall in the drivers' championship with 19 points, and Pic finished fifth with a single race victory. For the 2010 main series, the team kept Pic and resigned González. However, the success from the Asia Series did not quite continue into the main series as the team eventually finished seventh with one win, courtesy of Pic. Arden finished with fewer points than in 2009, but still managed to beat the previous teams' championship result of eighth position.

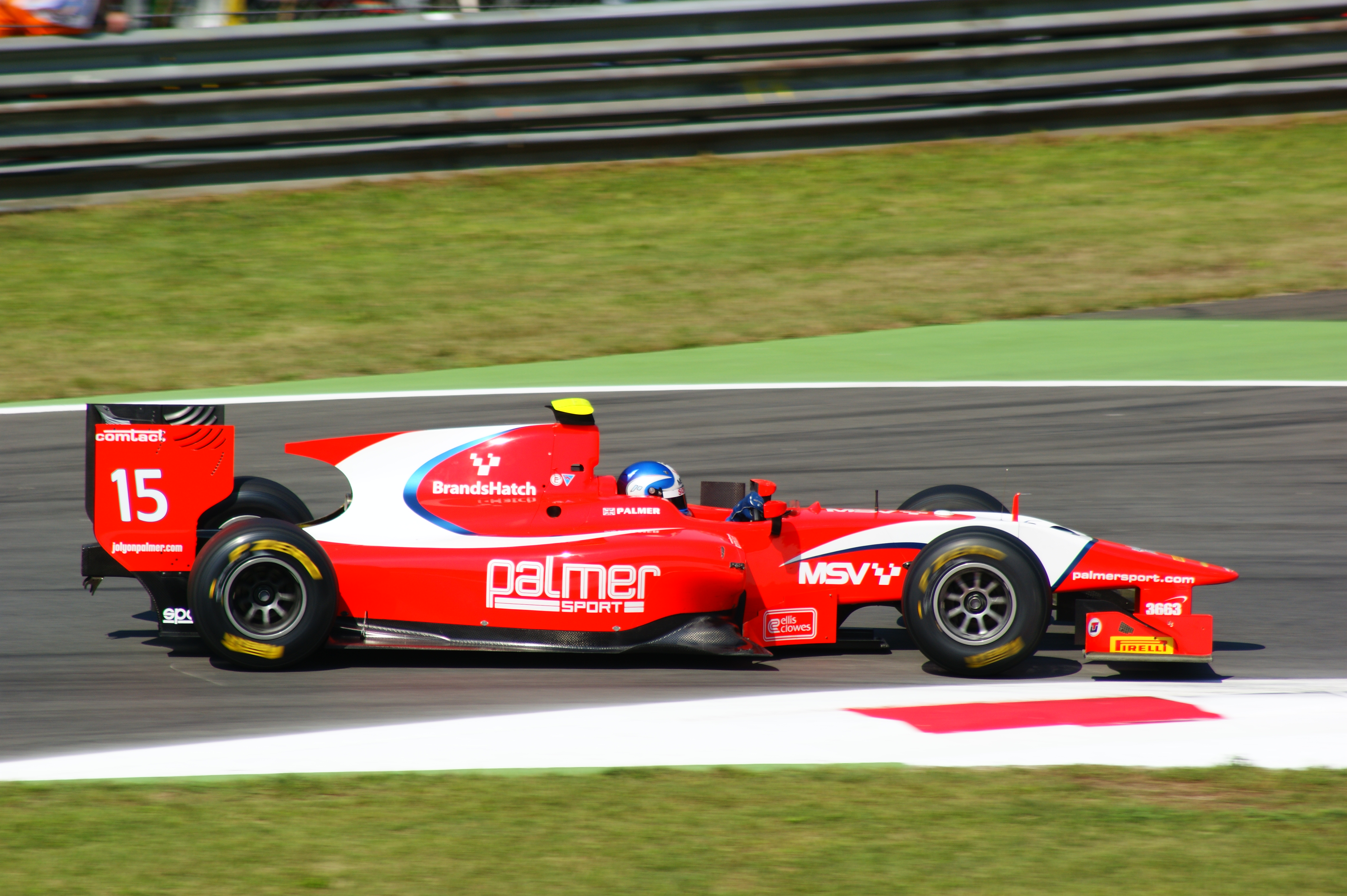
Jolyon Palmer driving at Monza in 2011.

For the 2011 GP2 Asia Series and 2011 GP2 Main Series seasons, the team signed Josef Král and Jolyon Palmer. The year was the team's worst so far in its GP2 history, as neither driver managed a win, pole or fastest lap in either series, and the team ended up finishing tenth in the Asia series and eleventh in the main series.

As the GP2 Asia Series had joined together with the GP2 main series in 2012, there were no longer two separate series. The team signed former 2008–09 Asia season driver Luiz Razia and former MW Arden GP3 sister team driver Simon Trummer for the 2012 season. Razia won the feature race of the first round in Malaysia, picked up two 2nd-place finishes during the two Bahrain rounds, and won again at Catalunya, Valencia and Silverstone. He finished the season as runner-up to champion Davide Valsecchi, whilst Trummer had a best race finish of seventh place to take 23rd in the drivers' championship. Arden finished third in the team's championship; its best result since 2005.

From there Arden struggled in subsequent GP2 Series, their highest constructor's finish being an eighth in 2013, and went without a win till the end of the series under the GP2 moniker.

=== GP3 ===
From 2010 onwards, they have operated a GP3 Series team with Mark Webber, the team was called MW Arden.

The team signed Michael Christensen, Miki Monrás and Leonardo Cordeiro for their debut season. Their first venture into the new series proved difficult as they only accumulate 18 points for the whole season with 2 fastest laps, leaving them 9th in the championship.

For 2011, the team completely refreshed their line up by signing Mitch Evans, Simon Trummer and Lewis Williamson. The season overshadowed the previous as the team came second overall in the constructors championship with 69 points, and both Williamson and Evans scoring 1 win each and coming 8th and 9th in the drivers championship respectively. This would also be the season where the team picked up its first pole positions with 2 from Evans and 1 from Williamson.

For 2012, they retained Evans, and partnered him with David Fumanelli and Matias Laine. Evans former teammates Simon Trummer and Lewis Williamson had moved to the GP2 sister team, and the new Formula Renault team Arden Caterham respectively. At the first round in Spain, Evans won the feature race. At the third round in Valencia, Evans managed to collect pole position and went on to win another feature race.

Evans went on to win the championship in the 2012 season.

The team scored their second driver's championship with Daniil Kvyat the following season, with Carlos Sainz, Jr. and Robert Vișoiu finishing tenth and eleventh respectively. In the following two seasons, Arden scored fifth and third in the team's championship respectively, with the highest driver standing coming from a fourth place for Emil Bernstorff in 2015.

Jake Dennis, 2015 Eurocup champion Jack Aitken and Colombian Tatiana Calderón competed with the team for the 2016 season. Calderón being the first women to compete for the team in its 19-year history. With three victories from Dennis and Aitken, the team finished as runners-up to ART Grand Prix in the constructor's standings.

In January 2017, Niko Kari was signed to the team for the 2017 season, making him the first Red Bull Junior to compete with the team since Kvyat and Sainz. A month later, Steijn Schothorst and Euroformula Open champion Leonardo Pulcini joined Arden.

2018 line-up consisted of Gabriel Aubry, Julien Falchero and Joey Mawson The team has season without wins, with just two podiums achieved by Mawson.

=== Formula Renault 3.5 ===
For 2012, Arden International entered an agreement with Caterham to join the Formula Renault 3.5 series as a joint team known as Arden Caterham. For their first season, they signed former GP3 driver for MW Arden Lewis Williamson, and one of Caterham F1's test drivers, Alexander Rossi.

Rossi scored his first podium finish with a third-place finish at the one race round at Monaco. After 3 rounds, Williamson was dropped by the team and the Red Bull Junior Driver Programme for failing to score a single point and was replaced by António Félix da Costa who had also replaced him at the Junior Programme too. On his debut, Da Costa scored two points with a ninth-place finish during the first race at the Nürburgring.

=== F4 British Championship ===
Jack Doohan, Dennis Hauger, Patrik Pasma and Sebastian Priaulx were Arden's drivers in the 2018 championship. Across the season, the team claimed eleven wins and claimed the teams' championship, with Doohan taking honours as rookie champion.

For the 2019 season, Arden signed Australian Formula Ford racer Bart Horsten and promoted British karting champions Alex Connor and Tommy Foster from their young driver programme, with Abbie Munro joining the team for the final three rounds.

In October 2019, Frederick Lubin became the team's first signing for the 2020 season, followed by Roman Bilinski and Alex Connor.

=== Formula Renault Eurocup ===
Oscar Piastri, Sami Taoufik and Aleksandr Vartanyan were 2018 Arden's drivers in Eurocup.

=== FIA Formula 2 Championship ===
Arden competed in 2017 with Sean Gelael and Norman Nato, taking their first Formula 2 win at Baku Circuit with Nato. For 2018, the team signed Nirei Fukuzumi and Maximilian Günther, changing their team name from Pertamina Arden to BWT Arden. The team had another sprint win with Günther, but decreased from seventh to ninth in the teams' championship.

For the 2019 season, Arden began a technical collaboration with Mercedes-affiliated FIA Formula 3 and Formula E outfit HWA RACELAB and signed Alfa Romeo racing team's Test Driver, Tatiana Calderon as their first driver and Renault junior and reigning GP3 champion, Anthoine Hubert as their second driver. However, Hubert died after a crash during the 2019 Spa-Francorchamps Formula 2 feature race.

On 23 September 2019 Arden announced that Artem Markelov will return to the F2 series to run at Sochi and Abu Dhabi. He would be running the 22 car since the 19 was retired for the season in honor of Hubert.

However the team will not race for the 2020 season, and instead will be replaced by HWA Racelab.

=== BRDC Formula 3 ===
Arden announced they would expand into the BRDC British F3 series for the 2021 season, with Frederick Lubin graduating from the F4 British Championship to take the first seat. Alex Connor filled the second seat for the first 3 race weekends, with Roman Bilinski taking over the seat from Spa onwards. Despite missing the first three rounds Roman Bilinski finished a respectable 7th in the drivers championship, in both his and the team's debut season in the championship. Bilinski was named 3rd in Autosport's 'Top 5 GB3 Drivers of 2021'.

== Current series results ==
=== GB3 Championship ===
Year	Car	Drivers	Races	Wins	Poles	F/Laps	Podiums	Points	D.C.	T.C.
2021	Tatuus-Cosworth F4-016	(Poland) Roman Bilinski	18	3	0	1	7	313	7th	4th
2021	Tatuus-Cosworth F4-016	(United Kingdom) Frederick Lubin	18	0	0	1	2	263	11th	4th
2021	Tatuus-Cosworth F4-016	(United Kingdom) Alex Connor	9	0	0	0	3	138	15th	4th
2022	Tatuus-Cosworth MSV-022	(United Kingdom) Alex Connor	24	0	0	0	1	252.5	10th	6th
2022	Tatuus-Cosworth MSV-022	(Canada) Nico Christodoulou	18	0	0	2	0	163	16th	6th
2022	Tatuus-Cosworth MSV-022	(United States) David Morales	24	0	0	1	1	130	22nd	6th
2023	Tatuus-Cosworth MSV-022	(United Kingdom) James Hedley	23	2	0	0	3	347	6th	3rd
2023	Tatuus-Cosworth MSV-022	(Canada) Nico Christodoulou	23	0	0	1	3	261	8th	3rd
2023	Tatuus-Cosworth MSV-022	(United States) Noah Ping	23	2	0	0	3	204	12th	3rd
2024	Tatuus-Cosworth MSV-022	(United States) Noah Ping	23	0	0	1	2	211	10th	5th
2024	Tatuus-Cosworth MSV-022	(United States) Nikita Johnson	18	2	0	1	2	193	11th	5th
2024	Tatuus-Cosworth MSV-022	(United Kingdom) James Hedley†	14	0	0	0	2	151	15th	5th
2024	Tatuus-Cosworth MSV-022	(United States) Shawn Rashid	23	0	0	0	1	125	17th	5th
2024	Tatuus-Cosworth MSV-022	(United States) Max Taylor	3	0	0	0	0	22	26th	9th
2026	Tatuus-Cosworth MSV-2026	(United Kingdom) Leon Wilson	23	0	0	0	2	179	11th	7th
2026	Tatuus-Cosworth MSV-2026	(United Kingdom) Lewis Gilbert	11	0	0	0	0	61	20th	7th
2026	Tatuus-Cosworth MSV-2026	(Israel) Matan Achituv	3	0	0	0	0	0	NC	7th

† Hedley drove for Rodin Motorsport and Chris Dittmann Racing from round 4 onwards.

=== GB4 Championship ===
Year	Car	Drivers	Races	Wins	Poles	F/Laps	Podiums	Points	D.C.	T.C.
2024	Tatuus F4-T014	(United Kingdom) Leon Wilson	20	0	0	2	1	202	10th	6th
2025	Tatuus MSV GB4-025	(United Kingdom) Leon Wilson	21	2	0	0	3	259	7th	5th
2025	Tatuus MSV GB4-025	(United States) Ava Dobson	21	0	0	0	1	120	19th	5th
2025	Tatuus MSV GB4-025	(United Kingdom) Dudley Ruddock	12	0	0	0	0	53	23rd	5th
2026	Tatuus MSV GB4-025	(Singapore) Michael Koh	21	1	0	1	1	138	15th	9th
2026	Tatuus MSV GB4-025	(France) Solenn Amrouche	21	0	0	0	0	31	29th	9th
2026	Tatuus MSV GB4-025	(United Kingdom) Charlie Myers	6	0	0	0	0	24	30th	9th
2026	Tatuus MSV GB4-025	(United States) William Rohan	3	0	0	0	0	5	32nd	9th
2026	Tatuus MSV GB4-025	(United States) Yana Kapoor	3	0	0	0	0	3	33rd	9th

== Former series results ==
=== F4 British Championship ===
Year	Car	Drivers	Races	Wins	Poles	F/Laps	Podiums	Points	D.C.	T.C.
2015	Mygale M14-F4	(United Kingdom) Ricky Collard	30	6	0	2	13	371	**2nd**	**2nd**
2015	Mygale M14-F4	(United Kingdom) Sandy Mitchell	30	2	2	2	5	193	7th	**2nd**
2015	Mygale M14-F4	(United Kingdom) Enaam Ahmed	30	1	0	0	4	176	8th	**2nd**
2016	Mygale M14-F4	(Australia) Luis Leeds	30	3	1	3	11	300	**3rd**	**2nd**
2016	Mygale M14-F4	(Brazil) Rafael Martins	30	1	0	0	2	205	9th	**2nd**
2016	Mygale M14-F4	(United Kingdom) Ayrton Simmons	24	0	0	0	1	82	11th	**2nd**
2016	Mygale M14-F4	(United Kingdom) Jack Martin	30	0	0	0	0	25	14th	**2nd**
2017	Mygale M14-F4	(Australia) Oscar Piastri	30	6	5	4	15	376.5	**2nd**	**2nd**
2017	Mygale M14-F4	(United Kingdom) Alex Quinn	30	4	2	4	11	307	4th	**2nd**
2017	Mygale M14-F4	(United Kingdom) Ayrton Simmons	30	1	0	2	6	257.5	7th	**2nd**
2017	Mygale M14-F4	(United Kingdom) Olli Caldwell	15	0	0	0	1	39	14th	**2nd**
2017	Mygale M14-F4	(United States) Yves Baltas	6	0	0	0	0	4	16th	**2nd**
2018	Mygale M14-F4	(Norway) Dennis Hauger	30	4	4	4	10	329	4th	**1st**
2018	Mygale M14-F4	(Australia) Jack Doohan	30	3	0	7	12	328	5th	**1st**
2018	Mygale M14-F4	(Finland) Patrik Pasma	30	2	4	2	11	315	6th	**1st**
2018	Mygale M14-F4	(United Kingdom) Sebastian Priaulx	30	1	2	3	8	275	7th	**1st**
2019	Mygale M14-F4	(Australia) Bart Horsten	30	1	0	1	10	275.5	5th	4th
2019	Mygale M14-F4	(United Kingdom) Tommy Foster	30	1	1	1	2	207	8th	4th
2019	Mygale M14-F4	(United Kingdom) Alex Connor	27	0	2	0	1	163	9th	4th
2019	Mygale M14-F4	(United Kingdom) Abbie Munro	9	0	0	0	0	6	16th	4th
2020	Mygale M14-F4	(United Kingdom) Alex Connor	26	3	2	3	8	265	4th	**3rd**
2020	Mygale M14-F4	(Poland) Roman Bilinski	26	0	0	1	3	156	8th	**3rd**
2020	Mygale M14-F4	(United Kingdom) Frederick Lubin	26	0	0	0	0	111	9th	**3rd**
2021	Mygale M14-F4	(United Kingdom) Zak Taylor	30	1	0	0	5	108	13th	5th
2021	Mygale M14-F4	(United Kingdom) Georgi Dimitrov (Note: Dimitrov drove for Richardson Racing until round 4.)	21	3	0	0	3	75	16th	5th
2021	Mygale M14-F4	(United States) David Morales	27	0	0	0	2	40	18th	5th
2021	Mygale M14-F4	(United Kingdom) Thomas Ikin	12	0	0	0	3	39	19th	5th
2021	Mygale M14-F4	(Australia) Cameron McLeod	9	0	0	1	1	23	20th	5th

=== FIA Formula 2 Championship ===
Year	Car	Drivers	Races	Wins	Poles	FLaps	D.C.	T.C.	Points
2017 (Note: Competed as Pertamina Arden in 2017.)	Dallara GP2/11-Mecachrome	(France) Norman Nato	22	1	0	0	9th	7th	108
2017	Dallara GP2/11-Mecachrome	(Indonesia) Sean Gelael	22	0	0	0	15th	7th	108
2018 (Note: Competed as BWT Arden in 2018 and 2019.)	Dallara F2 2018-Mecachrome	(Germany) Maximilian Günther	22	1	0	0	14th	9th	58
2018	Dallara F2 2018-Mecachrome	(Japan) Nirei Fukuzumi	23	0	0	0	17th	9th	58
2018	Dallara F2 2018-Mecachrome	(United Kingdom) Dan Ticktum	2	0	0	0	23rd	9th	58
2019	Dallara F2 2018-Mecachrome	(France) Anthoine Hubert (Note: Anthoine Hubert lost his life in an accident while racing for the team at Spa-Francorchamps.)	16	2	0	0	10th	8th	77
2019	Dallara F2 2018-Mecachrome	(Russia) Artem Markelov	4	0	0	0	16th	8th	77
2019	Dallara F2 2018-Mecachrome	(Colombia) Tatiana Calderón	22	0	0	0	22nd	8th	77

==== In detail ====
(key) (Races in bold indicate pole position) (Races in italics indicate fastest lap)

Year	Chassis Engine Tyres	Drivers	1	2	3	4	5	6	7	8	9	10	11	12	13	14	15	16	17	18	19	20	21	22	23	24	T.C.	Points
2017	GP2/11; Mecachrome; **P**		BHR; FEA	BHR; SPR	CAT; FEA	CAT; SPR	MON; FEA	MON; SPR	BAK; FEA	BAK; SPR	RBR; FEA	RBR; SPR	SIL; FEA	SIL; SPR	HUN; FEA	HUN; SPR	SPA; FEA	SPA; SPR	MNZ; FEA	MNZ; SPR	JER; FEA	JER; SPR	YMC; FEA	YMC; SPR			7th	108
2017	GP2/11; Mecachrome; **P**	(France) Norman Nato	2	Ret	16	13	Ret	Ret	5	1	Ret	7	2	6	7	5	8	4	13	10	11	10	13	18†			7th	108
2017	GP2/11; Mecachrome; **P**	(Indonesia) Sean Gelael	17	17	15	16	13	12	14	10	10	11	9	16	14	10	15	17	5	6	16	16	15	14			7th	108
2018	F2 2018; Mecachrome; **P**		BHR; FEA	BHR; SPR	BAK; FEA	BAK; SPR	CAT; FEA	CAT; SPR	MON; FEA	MON; SPR	LEC; FEA	LEC; SPR	RBR; FEA	RBR; SPR	SIL; FEA	SIL; SPR	HUN; FEA	HUN; SPR	SPA; FEA	SPA; SPR	MNZ; FEA	MNZ; SPR	SOC; FEA	SOC; SPR	YMC; FEA	YMC; SPR	9th	58
2018	F2 2018; Mecachrome; **P**	(Germany) Maximilian Günther	8	2	Ret	15†	Ret	12	11	6	12	11	15	12	8	1	16	Ret	9	16	12	16	16†	10			9th	58
2018	F2 2018; Mecachrome; **P**	(United Kingdom) Dan Ticktum																							11	Ret	9th	58
2018	F2 2018; Mecachrome; **P**	(Japan) Nirei Fukuzumi	18	8	13	12	11	Ret	10	11†	9	12	9	9	Ret	DNS	10	6	Ret	17	14	13	8	7	Ret	12	9th	58
2019	F2 2018; Mecachrome; **P**		BHR; FEA	BHR; SPR	BAK; FEA	BAK; SPR	CAT; FEA	CAT; SPR	MON; FEA	MON; SPR	LEC; FEA	LEC; SPR	RBR; FEA	RBR; SPR	SIL; FEA	SIL; SPR	HUN; FEA	HUN; SPR	SPA; FEA	SPA; SPR	MNZ; FEA	MNZ; SPR	SOC; FEA	SOC; SPR	YMC; FEA	YMC; SPR	8th	77
2019	F2 2018; Mecachrome; **P**	(Colombia) Tatiana Calderón	13	15	Ret	Ret	13	13	14	Ret	11	19†	17	13	14	16	16	Ret	C	C	Ret	14	15	16	16	14	8th	77
2019	F2 2018; Mecachrome; **P**	(France) Anthoine Hubert	4	9	10	11	6	5	8	1	8	1	4	17	18	11	11	11	C	C							8th	77
2019	F2 2018; Mecachrome; **P**	(Russia) Artem Markelov																					Ret	10	Ret	Ret	8th	77

=== GP3 Series ===
Year	Car	Drivers	Races	Wins	Poles	F/Laps	D.C.	T.C.	Points
2010 (Note: Collaboration with Mark Webber known as MW Arden in 2010-2013.)	Dallara GP3/10-Renault	(Spain) Miki Monrás	16	0	0	1	10th	9th	18
2010	Dallara GP3/10-Renault	(Brazil) Leonardo Cordeiro	16	0	0	1	27th	9th	18
2010	Dallara GP3/10-Renault	(Denmark) Michael Christensen	16	0	0	0	31st	9th	18
2011	Dallara GP3/10-Renault	(United Kingdom) Lewis Williamson	16	1	1	0	8th	**2nd**	**69**
2011	Dallara GP3/10-Renault	(New Zealand) Mitch Evans	16	1	2	0	9th	**2nd**	**69**
2011	Dallara GP3/10-Renault	(Switzerland) Simon Trummer	16	0	0	0	18th	**2nd**	**69**
2012	Dallara GP3/10-Renault	(New Zealand) Mitch Evans	16	3	4	2	**1st**	**2nd**	**309.5**
2012	Dallara GP3/10-Renault	(Finland) Matias Laine	16	1	0	1	5th	**2nd**	**309.5**
2012	Dallara GP3/10-Renault	(Italy) David Fumanelli	14	0	0	0	11th	**2nd**	**309.5**
2013	Dallara GP3/13-AER	(Russia) Daniil Kvyat	16	3	2	4	**1st**	**2nd**	**278**
2013	Dallara GP3/13-AER	(Spain) Carlos Sainz Jr.	16	0	1	2	10th	**2nd**	**278**
2013	Dallara GP3/13-AER	(Romania) Robert Vișoiu	16	2	0	0	12th	**2nd**	**278**
2014	Dallara GP3/13-AER	(United Kingdom) Jann Mardenborough	18	1	0	2	9th	5th	162
2014	Dallara GP3/13-AER	(Switzerland) Patric Niederhauser	18	2	0	2	10th	5th	162
2014	Dallara GP3/13-AER	(Romania) Robert Vișoiu	18	0	0	0	13th	5th	162
2015	Dallara GP3/13-AER	(United Kingdom) Emil Bernstorff	22	2	0	1	4th	**3rd**	**275**
2015	Dallara GP3/13-AER	(Italy) Kevin Ceccon	22	2	0	1	7th	**3rd**	**275**
2015	Dallara GP3/13-AER	(Poland) Aleksander Bosak	22	0	0	0	20th	**3rd**	**275**
2016	Dallara GP3/16-Mecachrome	(United Kingdom) Jake Dennis	18	2	0	4	4th	**2nd**	**297**
2016	Dallara GP3/16-Mecachrome	(United Kingdom) Jack Aitken	18	1	0	2	5th	**2nd**	**297**
2016	Dallara GP3/16-Mecachrome	(Colombia) Tatiana Calderón	18	0	0	0	21st	**2nd**	**297**
2017	Dallara GP3/16-Mecachrome	(Finland) Niko Kari	15	1	0	1	10th	4th	91
2017	Dallara GP3/16-Mecachrome	(Italy) Leonardo Pulcini	15	0	0	1	14th	4th	91
2017	Dallara GP3/16-Mecachrome	(Netherlands) Steijn Schothorst	15	0	0	0	17th	4th	91
2018	Dallara GP3/16-Mecachrome	(Australia) Joey Mawson	18	0	0	0	13th	6th	43
2018	Dallara GP3/16-Mecachrome	(France) Gabriel Aubry	18	0	0	0	18th	6th	43
2018	Dallara GP3/16-Mecachrome	(France) Julien Falchero	14	0	0	0	22nd	6th	43
2018	Dallara GP3/16-Mecachrome	(France) Sacha Fenestraz	4	0	0	0	24th	6th	43

=== In detail ===
(key) (Races in bold indicate pole position) (Races in italics indicate fastest lap)

Year	Chassis Engine Tyres	Drivers	1	2	3	4	5	6	7	8	9	10	11	12	13	14	15	16	17	18	T.C.	Points
2010	GP3/10; Renault; **P**		CAT; FEA	CAT; SPR	IST; FEA	IST; SPR	VAL; FEA	VAL; SPR	SIL; FEA	SIL; SPR	HOC; FEA	HOC; SPR	HUN; FEA	HUN; SPR	SPA; FEA	SPA; SPR	MNZ; FEA	MNZ; SPR			9th	18
2010	GP3/10; Renault; **P**	(Denmark) Michael Christensen	Ret	18	13	11	Ret	14	Ret	15	Ret	10	10	Ret	10	23^{†}	15	10			9th	18
2010	GP3/10; Renault; **P**	(Spain) Miki Monrás	10	23	7	2	5	13	15	18	Ret	15	Ret	20	9	3	11	6			9th	18
2010	GP3/10; Renault; **P**	(Brazil) Leonardo Cordeiro	18	12	18	24	Ret	21	Ret	Ret	Ret	Ret	22	13	14	Ret	Ret	8			9th	18
2011	GP3/10; Renault; **P**		IST; FEA	IST; SPR	CAT; FEA	CAT; SPR	VAL; FEA	VAL; SPR	SIL; FEA	SIL; SPR	NÜR; FEA	NÜR; SPR	HUN; FEA	HUN; SPR	SPA; FEA	SPA; SPR	MNZ; FEA	MNZ; SPR			2nd	69
2011	GP3/10; Renault; **P**	(New Zealand) Mitch Evans	6	7	**1**	5	3	4	9	Ret	**19**	22	Ret	24^{†}	11	Ret	8	Ret			2nd	69
2011	GP3/10; Renault; **P**	(Switzerland) Simon Trummer	19	21	27	25^{†}	Ret	Ret	12	10	9	16	16	12	19	5	5	4			2nd	69
2011	GP3/10; Renault; **P**	(United Kingdom) Lewis Williamson	Ret	20	14	9	**2**	6	7	1	2	14	6	Ret	9	DNS	18	10			2nd	69
2012	GP3/10; Renault; **P**		CAT; FEA	CAT; SPR	MON; FEA	MON; SPR	VAL; FEA	VAL; SPR	SIL; FEA	SIL; SPR	HOC; FEA	HOC; SPR	HUN; FEA	HUN; SPR	SPA; FEA	SPA; SPR	MNZ; FEA	MNZ; SPR			2nd	309.5
2012	GP3/10; Renault; **P**	(New Zealand) Mitch Evans	1	20	5	4	**1**	6	**2**	11	8	1	3	21	**3**	15	**Ret**	20			2nd	309.5
2012	GP3/10; Renault; **P**	(Italy) David Fumanelli	9	17	4	5	3	16	DNS	DNS	12	10	8	Ret	20	Ret	6	13			2nd	309.5
2012	GP3/10; Renault; **P**	(Finland) Matias Laine	5	3	21	16	5	3	9	18^{†}	4	5	7	6	5	1	3	6			2nd	309.5
2013	GP3/13; AER; **P**		CAT; FEA	CAT; SPR	VAL; FEA	VAL; SPR	SIL; FEA	SIL; SPR	NÜR; FEA	NÜR; SPR	HUN; FEA	HUN; SPR	SPA; FEA	SPA; SPR	MNZ; FEA	MNZ; SPR	YMC; FEA	YMC; SPR			2nd	278
2013	GP3/13; AER; **P**	(Spain) Carlos Sainz Jr.	15	DSQ	5	3	13	13	6	5	5	2	**Ret**	13	9	9	DSQ	18			2nd	278
2013	GP3/13; AER; **P**	(Romania) Robert Vișoiu	9	19	8	1	12	Ret	11	23	8	1	9	8	Ret	10	10	11			2nd	278
2013	GP3/13; AER; **P**	(Russia) Daniil Kvyat	20	Ret	4	5	4	4	Ret	16	3	7	1	6	**1**	2	**1**	5			2nd	278
2014	GP3/13; AER; **P**		CAT; FEA	CAT; SPR	RBR; FEA	RBR; SPR	SIL; FEA	SIL; SPR	HOC; FEA	HOC; SPR	HUN; FEA	HUN; SPR	SPA; FEA	SPA; SPR	MNZ; FEA	MNZ; SPR	SOC; FEA	SOC; SPR	YMC; FEA	YMC; SPR	5th	162
2014	GP3/13; AER; **P**	(Romania) Robert Vișoiu	13	11	Ret	14	20	13	10	9	3	5	Ret	20	19	14	Ret	10	15	8	5th	162
2014	GP3/13; AER; **P**	(Switzerland) Patric Niederhauser	10	9	10	6	13	Ret	12	6	6	1	Ret	Ret	13	19	8	1	7	DSQ	5th	162
2014	GP3/13; AER; **P**	(United Kingdom) Jann Mardenborough	14	14	11	Ret	9	15	8	1	7	3	4	4	11	Ret	6	4	13	Ret	5th	162
2015	GP3/13; AER; **P**		CAT; FEA	CAT; SPR	RBR; FEA	RBR; SPR	SIL; FEA	SIL; SPR	HUN; FEA	HUN; SPR	SPA; FEA	SPA; SPR	MNZ; FEA	MNZ; SPR	SOC; FEA	SOC; SPR	BHR; FEA	BHR; SPR	YMC; FEA	YMC; SPR	3rd	275
2015	GP3/13; AER; **P**	(Italy) Kevin Ceccon	7	6	Ret	DNS	7	1	7	1	Ret	13	3	4	Ret	DNS	14	18	Ret	10	3rd	275
2015	GP3/13; AER; **P**	(United Kingdom) Emil Bernstorff	3	5	4	4	2	6	4	Ret	1	Ret	1	Ret	3	6	2	4	2	6	3rd	275
2015	GP3/13; AER; **P**	(Poland) Aleksander Bosak	19	23	16	15	14	16	17	19	8	Ret	15	Ret	Ret	20	Ret	16	18	23	3rd	275
2016	GP3/16; Mecachrome; **P**		CAT; FEA	CAT; SPR	RBR; FEA	RBR; SPR	SIL; FEA	SIL; SPR	HUN; FEA	HUN; SPR	HOC; FEA	HOC; SPR	SPA; FEA	SPA; SPR	MNZ; FEA	MNZ; SPR	SEP; FEA	SEP; SPR	YMC; FEA	YMC; SPR	2nd	297
2016	GP3/16; Mecachrome; **P**	(United Kingdom) Jake Dennis	7	4	Ret	Ret	12	9	3	7	12	6	2	5	1	4	6	1	2	4	2nd	297
2016	GP3/16; Mecachrome; **P**	(Colombia) Tatiana Calderón	14	18	17	Ret	17	20	21	21	10	9	14	Ret	10	16	Ret	15	Ret	Ret	2nd	297
2016	GP3/16; Mecachrome; **P**	(United Kingdom) Jack Aitken	20	19	9	5	13	6	9	6	6	2	5	1	2	5	2	3	3	2	2nd	297
2017	GP3/16; Mecachrome; **P**		CAT; FEA	CAT; SPR	RBR; FEA	RBR; SPR	SIL; FEA	SIL; SPR	HUN; FEA	HUN; SPR	SPA; FEA	SPA; SPR	MNZ; FEA	MNZ; SPR	JER; FEA	JER; SPR	YMC; FEA	YMC; SPR			4th	91
2017	GP3/16; Mecachrome; **P**	(Finland) Niko Kari	15	14	Ret	18	5	3	9	6	9	9	15^{†}	C	6	19	1	13			4th	91
2017	GP3/16; Mecachrome; **P**	(Italy) Leonardo Pulcini	2	17	Ret	14	11	12	15	10	11	11	Ret	C	14	13	17^{†}	Ret			4th	91
2017	GP3/16; Mecachrome; **P**	(Netherlands) Steijn Schothorst	18	15	Ret	15	13	Ret	Ret	Ret	13	12	12	C	11	10	6	18			4th	91
2018	GP3/16; Mecachrome; **P**		CAT; FEA	CAT; SPR	LEC; FEA	LEC; SPR	RBR; FEA	RBR; SPR	SIL; FEA	SIL; SPR	HUN; FEA	HUN; SPR	SPA; FEA	SPA; SPR	MNZ; FEA	MNZ; SPR	SOC; FEA	SOC; SPR	YMC; FEA	YMC; SPR	6th	43
2018	GP3/16; Mecachrome; **P**	(France) Gabriel Aubry	12	Ret	15	Ret	16	Ret	Ret	Ret	10	13	13	11	Ret	Ret	11	6	15	14	6th	43
2018	GP3/16; Mecachrome; **P**	(France) Julien Falchero	14	11	16	15	15	14	Ret	Ret	15	15	16	14	Ret	13					6th	43
2018	GP3/16; Mecachrome; **P**	(France) Sacha Fenestraz															16	13	16	15	6th	43
2018	GP3/16; Mecachrome; **P**	(Australia) Joey Mawson	16	15	7	3	Ret	10	9	13	Ret	18	8	17^{†}	12	12	8	2	20	9	6th	43

=== GP2 Series ===
GP2 Series Results (Note: Ran under a Dutch licence from 2005 to 2009.)
Year	Car	Drivers	Races	Wins	Poles	F/Laps	D.C.	T.C.	Points
2005	Dallara GP2/05-Mecachrome	(Finland) Heikki Kovalainen	23	5	4	1	**2nd**	**2nd**	**126**
2005	Dallara GP2/05-Mecachrome	(France) Nicolas Lapierre	23	0	1	1	12th	**2nd**	**126**
2006	Dallara GP2/05-Mecachrome	(France) Nicolas Lapierre	17	0	0	1	9th	4th	57
2006	Dallara GP2/05-Mecachrome	(Germany) Michael Ammermüller	21	1	0	0	11th	4th	57
2006	Dallara GP2/05-Mecachrome	(Switzerland) Neel Jani	4	0	0	0	25th	4th	57
2007	Dallara GP2/05-Mecachrome	(Brazil) Bruno Senna	21	1	0	0	8th	7th	44
2007	Dallara GP2/05-Mecachrome	(South Africa) Adrian Zaugg	19	0	0	0	18th	7th	44
2007	Dallara GP2/05-Mecachrome	(Portugal) Filipe Albuquerque	2	0	0	0	32nd	7th	44
2008 (Note: Involved as Trust Team Arden in 2008.)	Dallara GP2/08-Mecachrome	(Switzerland) Sébastien Buemi	20	2	0	0	6th	6th	56
2008	Dallara GP2/08-Mecachrome	(Italy) Luca Filippi	10	0	0	0	19th	6th	56
2008	Dallara GP2/08-Mecachrome	(Netherlands) Yelmer Buurman	10	0	0	0	20th	6th	56
2009 (Note: Involved as Telmex Arden International in 2009.)	Dallara GP2/08-Mecachrome	(Mexico) Sergio Pérez	20	0	0	1	12th	8th	41
2009	Dallara GP2/08-Mecachrome	(Italy) Edoardo Mortara	20	1	0	2	14th	8th	41
2010	Dallara GP2/08-Mecachrome	(France) Charles Pic	20	1	1	0	10th	7th	32
2010	Dallara GP2/08-Mecachrome	(Venezuela) Rodolfo González	20	0	0	0	21st	7th	32
2011	Dallara GP2/11-Mecachrome	(Czech Republic) Josef Král	18	0	0	0	15th	11th	15
2011	Dallara GP2/11-Mecachrome	(United Kingdom) Jolyon Palmer	18	0	0	0	28th	11th	15
2012	Dallara GP2/11-Mecachrome	(Brazil) Luiz Razia	24	4	0	3	**2nd**	**3rd**	**226**
2012	Dallara GP2/11-Mecachrome	(Switzerland) Simon Trummer	24	0	0	0	23rd	**3rd**	**226**
2013	Dallara GP2/11-Mecachrome	(New Zealand) Mitch Evans	22	0	0	0	14th	8th	97
2013	Dallara GP2/11-Mecachrome	(Venezuela) Johnny Cecotto Jr.	21	0	1	1	16th	8th	97
2014	Dallara GP2/11-Mecachrome	(Brazil) André Negrão	18	0	0	0	12th	10th	48
2014	Dallara GP2/11-Mecachrome	(France) Tom Dillmann	8	0	0	0	19th (Note: Tom Dillmann raced for Caterham Racing for 6 races in 2014 scoring 2 of his 18 points.)	10th	48
2014	Dallara GP2/11-Mecachrome	(Austria) René Binder	22	0	0	0	25th	10th	48
2015	Dallara GP2/11-Mecachrome	(France) Norman Nato	21	0	0	0	18th	12th	25
2015	Dallara GP2/11-Mecachrome	(Brazil) André Negrão	21	0	0	0	20th	12th	25
2016	Dallara GP2/11-Mecachrome	(Sweden) Jimmy Eriksson	18	0	0	0	20th	11th	12
2016	Dallara GP2/11-Mecachrome	(Malaysia) Nabil Jeffri	22	0	0	0	22nd	11th	12
2016	Dallara GP2/11-Mecachrome	(United Kingdom) Emil Bernstorff	2	0	0	0	25th	11th	12

==== In detail ====
(key) (Races in bold indicate pole position) (Races in italics indicate fastest lap)

Year	Chassis Engine Tyres	Drivers	1	2	3	4	5	6	7	8	9	10	11	12	13	14	15	16	17	18	19	20	21	22	23	24	T.C.	Points
2005	GP2/05; Renault; **B**		SMR; FEA	SMR; SPR	CAT; FEA	CAT; SPR	MON; FEA	NÜR; FEA	NÜR; SPR	MAG; FEA	MAG; SPR	SIL; FEA	SIL; SPR	HOC; FEA	HOC; SPR	HUN; FEA	HUN; SPR	IST; FEA	IST; SPR	MNZ; FEA	MNZ; SPR	SPA; FEA	SPA; SPR	BHR; FEA	BHR; SPR		2nd	126
2005	GP2/05; Renault; **B**	(Finland) Heikki Kovalainen	1	3	3	Ret	**5**	1	Ret	1	3	2	3	5	6	2	5	10	1	**1**	5	15^{†}	9	3	Ret		2nd	126
2005	GP2/05; Renault; **B**	(France) Nicolas Lapierre	**DNS**	Ret	11	9	Ret	12	Ret	3	5	10	Ret	9	7	12	6	Ret	13	4	Ret	Ret	23^{†}	6	20		2nd	126
2006	GP2/05; Renault; **B**		VAL; FEA	VAL; SPR	SMR; FEA	SMR; SPR	NÜR; FEA	NÜR; SPR	CAT; FEA	CAT; SPR	MON; FEA	SIL; FEA	SIL; SPR	MAG; FEA	MAG; SPR	HOC; FEA	HOC; SPR	HUN; FEA	HUN; SPR	IST; FEA	IST; SPR	MNZ; FEA	MNZ; SPR				4th	57
2006	GP2/05; Renault; **B**	(Germany) Michael Ammermüller	7	1	2	Ret	10	6	3	8	7	Ret	Ret	12	8	9	Ret	Ret	11	13	Ret	12	Ret				4th	57
2006	GP2/05; Renault; **B**	(France) Nicolas Lapierre	4	3	3	7	5	2	Ret	Ret	Ret					20	7	Ret	Ret	14	6	6	4				4th	57
2006	GP2/05; Renault; **B**	(Switzerland) Neel Jani										NC	Ret	11	7												4th	57
2007	GP2/05; Renault; **B**		BHR; FEA	BHR; SPR	CAT; FEA	CAT; SPR	MON; FEA	MAG; FEA	MAG; SPR	SIL; FEA	SIL; SPR	NÜR; FEA	NÜR; SPR	HUN; FEA	HUN; SPR	IST; FEA	IST; SPR	MNZ; FEA	MNZ; SPR	SPA; FEA	SPA; SPR	VAL; FEA	VAL; SPR				7th	44
2007	GP2/05; Renault; **B**	(Brazil) Bruno Senna	4	8	1	4	11	3	7	11	10	15	Ret	13	12	10	6	4	3	Ret	8	Ret	14				7th	44
2007	GP2/05; Renault; **B**	(South Africa) Adrian Zaugg	6	17	Ret	13	9	6	Ret	14	19	7	Ret	7	Ret	Ret	15^{†}	Ret	Ret	13	19						7th	44
2007	GP2/05; Renault; **B**	(Portugal) Filipe Albuquerque																				10	10				7th	44
2008	GP2/08; Renault; **B**		CAT; FEA	CAT; SPR	IST; FEA	IST; SPR	MON; FEA	MON; FEA	MAG; FEA	MAG; SPR	SIL; FEA	SIL; SPR	HOC; FEA	HOC; SPR	HUN; FEA	HUN; SPR	VAL; FEA	VAL; SPR	SPA; FEA	SPA; SPR	MNZ; FEA	MNZ; SPR					6th	56
2008	GP2/08; Renault; **B**	(Switzerland) Sébastien Buemi	7	2	6	3	Ret	11	Ret	1	4	DNS	Ret	8	7	1	6	Ret	5	4	3	7					6th	56
2008	GP2/08; Renault; **B**	(Netherlands) Yelmer Buurman	Ret	10	14	Ret	12	8	12	2	15	10															6th	56
2008	GP2/08; Renault; **B**	(Italy) Luca Filippi											Ret	Ret	15	Ret	8	13	19	Ret	Ret	Ret					6th	56
2009	GP2/08; Renault; **B**		CAT; FEA	CAT; SPR	MON; FEA	MON; FEA	IST; FEA	IST; SPR	SIL; FEA	SIL; SPR	NÜR; FEA	NÜR; SPR	HUN; FEA	HUN; SPR	VAL; FEA	VAL; SPR	SPA; FEA	SPA; SPR	MNZ; FEA	MNZ; SPR	ALG; FEA	ALG; SPR					8th	41
2009	GP2/08; Renault; **B**	(Mexico) Sergio Pérez	14	17	12	9	Ret	16	4	6	8	20^{†}	Ret	16	3	2	Ret	4	Ret	Ret	Ret	11					8th	41
2009	GP2/08; Renault; **B**	(Italy) Edoardo Mortara	6	1	Ret	13	Ret	9	Ret	Ret	17	Ret	12	14	6	12	8	Ret	5	Ret	Ret	8					8th	41
2010	GP2/08; Renault; **B**		CAT; FEA	CAT; SPR	MON; FEA	MON; SPR	IST; FEA	IST; SPR	VAL; FEA	VAL; SPR	SIL; FEA	SIL; SPR	HOC; FEA	HOC; SPR	HUN; FEA	HUN; SPR	SPA; FEA	SPA; SPR	MNZ; FEA	MNZ; SPR	YMC; FEA	YMC; SPR					7th	32
2010	GP2/08; Renault; **B**	(France) Charles Pic	1	7	11	7	Ret	DNS	6	5	10	8	**3**	17	11	9	4	Ret	11	8	20	11					7th	32
2010	GP2/08; Renault; **B**	(Venezuela) Rodolfo González	15	14	10	Ret	16	16	Ret	Ret	16	20	18	Ret	Ret	15	8	4	Ret	Ret	10	16					7th	32
2011	GP2/11; Mecachrome; **P**		IST; FEA	IST; SPR	CAT; FEA	CAT; SPR	MON; FEA	MON; SPR	VAL; FEA	VAL; SPR	SIL; FEA	SIL; SPR	NÜR; FEA	NÜR; SPR	HUN; FEA	HUN; SPR	SPA; FEA	SPA; SPR	MNZ; FEA	MNZ; SPR							11th	15
2011	GP2/11; Mecachrome; **P**	(Czech Republic) Josef Král	13	6	9	21^{†}	6	2	8	Ret	23	20	18	11	9	17	8	3	Ret	17							11th	15
2011	GP2/11; Mecachrome; **P**	(United Kingdom) Jolyon Palmer	17	9	18	17	NC	11	9	Ret	20	16	19	Ret	22	18^{†}	Ret	14	Ret	19							11th	15
2012	GP2/11; Mecachrome; **P**		SEP; FEA	SEP; SPR	BHR1; FEA	BHR1; SPR	BHR2; FEA	BHR2; SPR	CAT; FEA	CAT; SPR	MON; FEA	MON; SPR	VAL; FEA	VAL; SPR	SIL; FEA	SIL; SPR	HOC; FEA	HOC; SPR	HUN; FEA	HUN; SPR	SPA; FEA	SPA; SPR	MNZ; FEA	MNZ; SPR	MRN; FEA	MRN; SPR	3rd	226
2012	GP2/11; Mecachrome; **P**	(Switzerland) Simon Trummer	23	16	16	8	14	24^{†}	23	20	12	9	10	7	15	11	16	17	13	13	15	16	16	17	Ret	14	3rd	226
2012	GP2/11; Mecachrome; **P**	(Brazil) Luiz Razia	1	5	2	4	4	2	8	1	15	6	3	1	5	1	7	10	3	3	6	20	Ret	16	5	4	3rd	226
2013	GP2/11; Mecachrome; **P**		SEP; FEA	SEP; SPR	BHR; FEA	BHR; SPR	CAT; FEA	CAT; SPR	MON; FEA	MON; SPR	SIL; FEA	SIL; SPR	NÜR; FEA	NÜR; SPR	HUN; FEA	HUN; SPR	SPA; FEA	SPA; SPR	MNZ; FEA	MNZ; SPR	MRN; FEA	MRN; SPR	YMC; FEA	YMC; SPR			8th	97
2013	GP2/11; Mecachrome; **P**	(Venezuela) Johnny Cecotto Jr.	12	5	10	12	8	5	**Ret**	EX	17	Ret	10	5	21	Ret	14	7	12	8	14	6	8	Ret			8th	97
2013	GP2/11; Mecachrome; **P**	(New Zealand) Mitch Evans	10	3	Ret	15	12	13	3	3	19	14	16	7	7	2	11	10	Ret	15	11	15	Ret	14			8th	97
2014	GP2/11; Mecachrome; **P**		BHR; FEA	BHR; SPR	CAT; FEA	CAT; SPR	MON; FEA	MON; SPR	RBR; FEA	RBR; SPR	SIL; FEA	SIL; SPR	HOC; FEA	HOC; SPR	HUN; FEA	HUN; SPR	SPA; FEA	SPA; SPR	MNZ; FEA	MNZ; SPR	SOC; FEA	SOC; SPR	YMC; FEA	YMC; SPR			10th	48
2014	GP2/11; Mecachrome; **P**	(Austria) René Binder	9	8	15	Ret	Ret	20	12	12	24	19	11	22	20	14	Ret	23	20	Ret	23	Ret	Ret	23			10th	48
2014	GP2/11; Mecachrome; **P**	(Brazil) André Negrão	20	18			Ret	15	16	14	20	16	18	21	15	Ret	9	8	5	5	6	6	Ret	24			10th	48
2014	GP2/11; Mecachrome; **P**	(France) Tom Dillmann			8	3																					10th	48
2015	GP2/11; Mecachrome; **P**		BHR; FEA	BHR; SPR	CAT; FEA	CAT; SPR	MON; FEA	MON; SPR	RBR; FEA	RBR; SPR	SIL; FEA	SIL; SPR	HUN; FEA	HUN; SPR	SPA; FEA	SPA; SPR	MNZ; FEA	MNZ; SPR	SOC; FEA	SOC; SPR	BHR; FEA	BHR; SPR	YMC; FEA	YMC; SPR			12th	25
2015	GP2/11; Mecachrome; **P**	(Brazil) André Negrão	9	8	23^{†}	21	21	17	16	21	20	15	20	21	20	14	14	18	15	11	17	20	9	C			12th	25
2015	GP2/11; Mecachrome; **P**	(France) Norman Nato	Ret	16	8	7	18	21	20	13	18	23	11	6	Ret	20	6	Ret	12	9	24	10	Ret	C			12th	25
2016	GP2/11; Mecachrome; **P**		CAT; FEA	CAT; SPR	MON; FEA	MON; SPR	BAK; FEA	BAK; SPR	RBR; FEA	RBR; SPR	SIL; FEA	SIL; SPR	HUN; FEA	HUN; SPR	HOC; FEA	HOC; SPR	SPA; FEA	SPA; SPR	MNZ; FEA	MNZ; SPR	SEP; FEA	SEP; SPR	YMC; FEA	YMC; SPR			11th	12
2016	GP2/11; Mecachrome; **P**	(Malaysia) Nabil Jeffri	19	18	Ret	17	Ret	7	Ret	17	17	15	20	16	11	Ret	19	18	13	12	18	Ret	Ret	20			11th	12
2016	GP2/11; Mecachrome; **P**	(Sweden) Jimmy Eriksson	16	19	Ret	15	11^{†}	Ret	5	13	15	17	21^{†}	Ret	12	13	15	20	15	18^{†}							11th	12
2016	GP2/11; Mecachrome; **P**	(United Kingdom) Emil Bernstorff																					17	15			11th	12

=== GP2 Final ===
(key) (Races in bold indicate pole position) (Races in italics indicate fastest lap)

Year	Chassis Engine Tyres	Drivers	1	2	T.C.	Points
2011	GP2/11; Mecachrome; **P**		YMC; FEA	YMC; SPR	11th	0
2011	GP2/11; Mecachrome; **P**	(Czech Republic) Josef Král	20	12	11th	0
2011	GP2/11; Mecachrome; **P**	(Switzerland) Simon Trummer	Ret	15	11th	0

=== Formula Renault 3.5 Series ===
Formula Renault 3.5 Series (Note: Collaboration with Caterham known as Arden Caterham in 2012-2013.)
Year	Car	Drivers	Races	Wins	Poles	F/Laps	Podiums	D.C.	T.C.	Points
2012	Dallara T12-Renault	(Portugal) António Félix da Costa	12	4	0	2	6	4th	**2nd**	**229**
2012	Dallara T12-Renault	(United States) Alexander Rossi	17	0	0	4	1	11th	**2nd**	**229**
2012	Dallara T12-Renault	(United Kingdom) Lewis Williamson	5	0	0	0	0	32nd	**2nd**	**229**
2013	Dallara T12-Renault	(Portugal) António Félix da Costa	17	3	1	2	6	**3rd**	4th	186
2013	Dallara T12-Renault	(Brazil) Pietro Fantin	17	0	0	0	0	21st	4th	186
2014	Dallara T12-Renault	(France) Pierre Gasly	17	0	1	3	8	**2nd**	**3rd**	**222**
2014	Dallara T12-Renault	(United Kingdom) William Buller	17	0	0	0	1	16th	**3rd**	**222**
2015	Dallara T12-Renault	(Russia) Egor Orudzhev	17	2	0	0	4	5th	5th	188
2015	Dallara T12-Renault	(Canada) Nicholas Latifi	17	0	0	1	0	11th	5th	188
2016	Dallara T12-Zytek	(Russia) Egor Orudzhev	18	5	1	3	8	**3rd**	**1st**	**380**
2016	Dallara T12-Zytek	(France) Aurélien Panis	18	2	1	0	2	5th	**1st**	**380**

=== GP2 Asia Series ===
GP2 Asia Series (Note: Ran under a Dutch license in 2008-2010.)
Year	Car	Drivers	Races	Wins	Poles	F/Laps	D.C.	T.C.	Points
2008 (Note: Involved as Trust Team Arden in 2008.)	Dallara GP2/08-Mecachrome	(Switzerland) Sébastien Buemi	10	1	0	1	**2nd**	**2nd**	**50**
2008	Dallara GP2/08-Mecachrome	(Netherlands) Yelmer Buurman	6	0	0	0	9th	**2nd**	**50**
2008	Dallara GP2/08-Mecachrome	(Pakistan) Adam Khan	4	0	0	0	28th	**2nd**	**50**
2008–09	Dallara GP2/08-Mecachrome	(Italy) Edoardo Mortara	8	0	0	0	11th	6th	20
2008–09	Dallara GP2/08-Mecachrome	(Brazil) Luiz Razia	11	1	1	0	13th	6th	20
2008–09	Dallara GP2/08-Mecachrome	(Finland) Mika Mäki	2	0	0	0	29th	6th	20
2008–09	Dallara GP2/08-Mecachrome	(Netherlands) Renger van der Zande	1	0	0	0	31st	6th	20
2009–10	Dallara GP2/08-Mecachrome	(Spain) Javier Villa	6	0	0	1	4th	**2nd**	**37**
2009–10	Dallara GP2/08-Mecachrome	(France) Charles Pic	4	1	1	0	5th	**2nd**	**37**
2009–10	Dallara GP2/08-Mecachrome	(Venezuela) Rodolfo González	2	0	0	0	29th	**2nd**	**37**
2011	Dallara GP2/11-Mecachrome	(Czech Republic) Josef Král	4	0	0	0	10th	10th	8
2011	Dallara GP2/11-Mecachrome	(United Kingdom) Jolyon Palmer	4	0	0	0	19th	10th	8

=== In detail ===
(key) (Races in bold indicate pole position) (Races in italics indicate fastest lap)

Year	Chassis Engine Tyres	Drivers	1	2	3	4	5	6	7	8	9	10	11	12	T.C.	Points
2008	GP2/05; Renault; **B**		DUB1; FEA	DUB1; SPR	SEN; FEA	SEN; SPR	SEP; FEA	SEP; SPR	BHR; FEA	BHR; SPR	DUB2; FEA	DUB2; SPR			**2nd**	**50**
2008	GP2/05; Renault; **B**	(Switzerland) Sébastien Buemi	DSQ	Ret	1	7	Ret	Ret	2	2	2	2			**2nd**	**50**
2008	GP2/05; Renault; **B**	(Pakistan) Adam Khan	18	15	Ret	11									**2nd**	**50**
2008	GP2/05; Renault; **B**	(Netherlands) Yelmer Buurman					6	5	9	8	3	5			**2nd**	**50**
2008–09	GP2/05; Renault; **B**		SHI; FEA	SHI; SPR	DUB3; FEA	DUB3; SPR	BHR1; FEA	BHR1; SPR	LSL; FEA	LSL; SPR	SEP; FEA	SEP; SPR	BHR2; FEA	BHR2; SPR	6th	20
2008–09	GP2/05; Renault; **B**	(Brazil) Luiz Razia	Ret	17	10	C	14	9	8	6	Ret	Ret	8	1	6th	20
2008–09	GP2/05; Renault; **B**	(Finland) Mika Mäki	Ret	10											6th	20
2008–09	GP2/05; Renault; **B**	(Netherlands) Renger van der Zande			11	C									6th	20
2008–09	GP2/05; Renault; **B**	(Italy) Edoardo Mortara					3	8	7	4	Ret	17	Ret	16	6th	20
2009–10	GP2/05; Renault; **B**		YMC1; FEA	YMC1; SPR	YMC2; FEA	YMC2; SPR	BHR1; FEA	BHR1; SPR	BHR2; FEA	BHR2; SPR					**2nd**	**37**
2009–10	GP2/05; Renault; **B**	(France) Charles Pic	Ret	15	**10**	8	5	1	3	19					**2nd**	**37**
2009–10	GP2/05; Renault; **B**	(Venezuela) Rodolfo González	14	16											**2nd**	**37**
2009–10	GP2/05; Renault; **B**	(Spain) Javier Villa			4	11	3	3	7	6					**2nd**	**37**
2011	GP2/11; Mecachrome; **P**		YMC; FEA	YMC; SPR	IMO; FEA	IMO; SPR									10th	8
2011	GP2/11; Mecachrome; **P**	(Czech Republic) Josef Král	6	2	12	9									10th	8
2011	GP2/11; Mecachrome; **P**	(United Kingdom) Jolyon Palmer	14	10	18	Ret									10th	8

=== A1 GP Series ===
A1 Grand Prix results
Year	Car	Team	Drivers	Wins	Poles	F/Laps	T.C.	Points
2005–06	Lola A1GP-Zytek	(United Kingdom) A1 Team Great Britain	(United Kingdom) Robbie Kerr	0	1	0	**3rd**	**97**
2005–06	Lola A1GP-Zytek	(United Kingdom) A1 Team Great Britain	(United Kingdom) Darren Manning	0	0	0	**3rd**	**97**

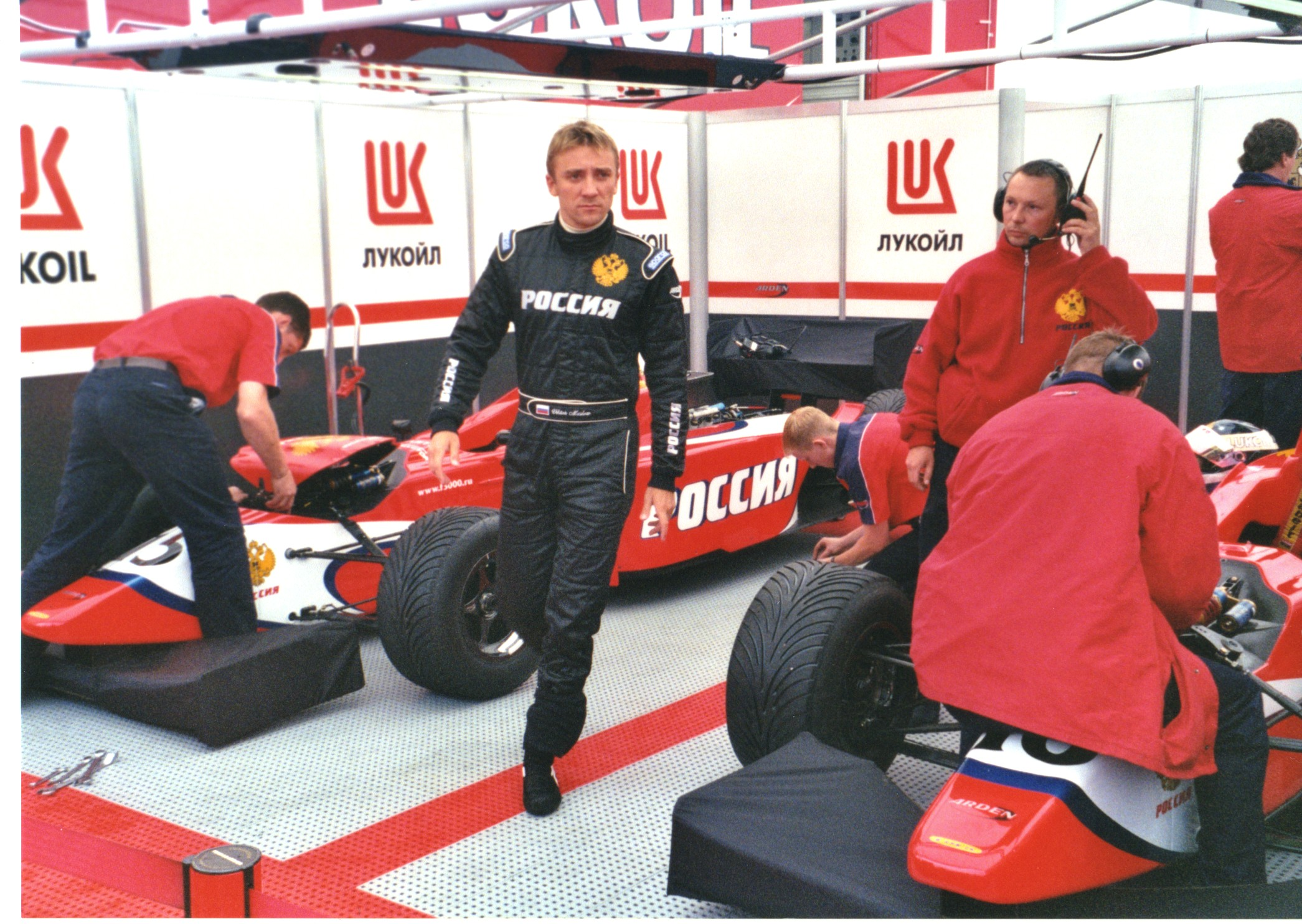
Viktor Maslov in the Arden garage, 2001

=== International Formula 3000 Series ===
Year	Car	Drivers	Wins	Poles	F/Laps	D.C.	T.C.	Points
1997	Lola T96/50-Zytek	(United Kingdom) Christian Horner	0	0	0	21st	N/A	N/A
1998 (Note: Collaboration with KTR team in 1998.)	Lola T96/50-Zytek Judd	(Belgium) Kurt Mollekens	0	0	0	6th	N/A	N/A
1998	Lola T96/50-Zytek Judd	(United Kingdom) Christian Horner	0	0	0	33rd	N/A	N/A
1999 (Note: Involved as Arden Team Russia in 1999.)	Lola B99/50-Zytek	(Belgium) Marc Goossens	0	0	0	NC	N/A	N/A
1999	Lola B99/50-Zytek	(Russia) Viktor Maslov	0	0	0	NC	N/A	N/A
2000 (Note: Involved as Lukoil Arden Racing in 2000-2001.)	Lola B99/50-Zytek	(United Kingdom) Darren Manning	0	1	1	8th	8th	10
2000	Lola B99/50-Zytek	(Russia) Viktor Maslov	0	0	0	32nd	8th	10
2001	Lola B99/50-Zytek	(United Kingdom) Darren Manning	0	0	0	11th	9th	9
2001	Lola B99/50-Zytek	(Russia) Viktor Maslov	0	0	0	25th	9th	9
2002	Lola B02/50-Zytek Judd	(Czech Republic) Tomáš Enge	3	4	5	**3rd**	**1st**	**79**
2002	Lola B02/50-Zytek Judd	(Sweden) Björn Wirdheim	1	1	0	4th	**1st**	**79**
2003	Lola B02/50-Zytek Judd	(Sweden) Björn Wirdheim	3	5	7	**1st**	**1st**	**95**
2003	Lola B02/50-Zytek Judd	(United States) Townsend Bell	0	0	0	9th	**1st**	**95**
2004	Lola B02/50-Zytek Judd	(Italy) Vitantonio Liuzzi	7	9	3	**1st**	**1st**	**130**
2004	Lola B02/50-Zytek Judd	(Monaco) Robert Doornbos	1	0	1	**3rd**	**1st**	**130**

=== Italian Formula 3000 Series ===
Italian Formula 3000 results
Year	Car	Drivers	Wins	Poles	F/Laps	Points	D.C.	T.C.
1999	Lola T96/50-Zytek	(Russia) Viktor Maslov	0	0	0	1	18th	11th
2000	Lola T96/50-Zytek	(United Kingdom) Warren Hughes	2	1	3	37	**2nd**	**1st**
2000	Lola T96/50-Zytek	(United Kingdom) Darren Manning	1	1	1	14	6th	**1st**

=== Eurocup Formula Renault ===
Year	Car	Drivers	Races	Wins	Poles	F/Laps	Podiums	Points	D.C.	T.C.	Points
2017	Tatuus–Renault	(United Kingdom) Dan Ticktum	11	1	1	1	2	134	6th	6th	139
2017	Tatuus–Renault	(Australia) Zane Goddard	11	0	0	0	0	5	19th	6th	139
2017	Tatuus–Renault	(Belgium) Ghislain Cordeel	11	0	0	0	0	0	24th	6th	139
2018	Tatuus–Renault	(Australia) Oscar Piastri	20	0	0	0	3	110	8th	6th	122
2018	Tatuus–Renault	(Russia) Aleksandr Vartanyan	8	0	0	1	0	11	16th	6th	122
2018	Tatuus–Renault	(Morocco) Sami Taoufik	20	0	0	0	0	1	22nd	6th	122
2018	Tatuus–Renault	(Russia) Nikita Volegov	12	0	0	0	0	0	26th	6th	122
2019	Tatuus F3 T-318–Renault	(Finland) Patrik Pasma	20	0	0	0	1	65	10th	**3rd**	189
2019	Tatuus F3 T-318–Renault	(United Kingdom) Frank Bird	20	0	0	0	0	14	18th	**3rd**	189
2019	Tatuus F3 T-318–Renault	(Spain) Sebastián Fernández	12	0	0	1	1	68	9th	**3rd**	189
2019	Tatuus F3 T-318–Renault	(United Kingdom) Alex Quinn	6	0	0	0	2	48	12th	**3rd**	189
2020	Tatuus F3 T-318–Renault	(United Kingdom) Alex Quinn	20	1	1	1	5	183	4th	4th	273.5
2020	Tatuus F3 T-318–Renault	(France) Reshad de Gerus	20	0	0	0	0	8	17th	4th	273.5
2020	Tatuus F3 T-318–Renault	(Belgium) Ugo de Wilde	20	0	0	0	3	85.5	9th	4th	273.5

=== Formula Regional European Championship ===
Year	Car	Drivers	Races	Wins	Poles	F. Laps	Podiums	D.C.	Pts	T.C.	Pts
2021	Tatuus F3 T-318	(United Kingdom) Alex Quinn	20	0	0	0	2	9th	104	4th	195
2021	Tatuus F3 T-318	(Finland) William Alatalo	20	0	0	0	1	11th	91	4th	195
2021	Tatuus F3 T-318	(Italy) Nicola Marinangeli	20	0	0	0	0	30th	0	4th	195
2022	Tatuus F3 T-318	(Brazil) Eduardo Barrichello	20	0	0	0	1	11th	51	7th	94
2022	Tatuus F3 T-318	(Paraguay) Joshua Dürksen	20	0	0	0	0	14th	40	7th	94
2022	Tatuus F3 T-318	(Mexico) Noel León	20	0	0	0	0	23rd	3	7th	94
2023	Tatuus F3 T-318	(Paraguay) Joshua Dürksen	20	0	0	0	1	19th	26	10th	
2023	Tatuus F3 T-318	(Hungary) Levente Révész	16	0	0	0	0	25th	2	10th	
2023	Tatuus F3 T-318	(United Kingdom) Tom Lebbon	20	0	0	0	0	27th	0	10th	

==== In detail ====
(key) (Races in bold indicate pole position) (Races in italics indicate fastest lap)

Year	Drivers	1	2	3	4	5	6	7	8	9	10	11	12	13	14	15	16	17	18	19	20	T.C.	Points
2021		IMO; 1	IMO; 2	CAT; 1	CAT; 2	MCO; 1	MCO; 2	LEC; 1	LEC; 2	ZAN; 1	ZAN; 2	SPA; 1	SPA; 2	RBR; 1	RBR; 2	VAL; 1	VAL; 2	MUG; 1	MUG; 2	MNZ; 1	MNZ; 2	4th	195
2021	(Finland) William Alatalo	6	5	6	7	8	14	9	3	12	4	9	10	8	15	13	13	4	16	14	9	4th	195
2021	(Italy) Nicola Marinangeli	Ret	18	Ret	21	Ret	Ret	25	Ret	27	28	26	Ret	20	21	31	18	30	28	17	Ret	4th	195
2021	(United Kingdom) Alex Quinn	2	Ret	4	2	6	4	6	21	10	Ret	10	Ret	4	8	6	15	14	11	13	11	4th	195
2022		MNZ; 1	MNZ; 2	IMO; 1	IMO; 2	MCO; 1	MCO; 2	LEC; 1	LEC; 2	ZAN; 1	ZAN; 2	HUN; 1	HUN; 2	SPA; 1	SPA; 2	RBR; 1	RBR; 2	CAT; 1	CAT; 2	MUG; 1	MUG; 2	7th	94
2022	(Paraguay) Joshua Dürksen	19	14	6	12	12	10	13	12	Ret	18	15	Ret	21	14	6	6	10	6	9	13	7th	94
2022	(Mexico) Noel León	21	25	22	15	10	9	17	20	24	17	13	17	22	Ret	12	12	12	17	24	27	7th	94
2022	(Brazil) Eduardo Barrichello	26	20	19	17	11	13	21	15	18	32	Ret	18	3	5	5	8	6	12	23	23	7th	94
2023		IMO; 1	IMO; 2	CAT; 1	CAT; 2	HUN; 1	HUN; 2	SPA; 1	SPA; 2	MUG; 1	MUG; 2	LEC; 1	LEC; 2	RBR; 1	RBR; 2	MNZ; 1	MNZ; 2	ZAN; 1	ZAN; 2	HOC; 1	HOC; 2	10th	28
2023	(United Kingdom) Tom Lebbon	30	23	27	25	25	23	18	31	21	20	17	22	14	15	12	32	20	18	21	22	10th	28
2023	(Paraguay) Joshua Dürksen	15	Ret	18	21	20	14	10	3	14	23†	18	9	16	NC	22	Ret	14	7	17	14	10th	28
2023	(Hungary) Levente Révész	24	11	21	27	16	15	22	26	Ret	10	25	Ret	25	18	10	23					10th	28

== Timeline ==
Current series
GB3 Championship	2021–2024, 2026–present
GB4 Championship	2024–present
Former series
International Formula 3000	1997–2004
Italian Formula 3000	1999–2000
A1 Grand Prix	2005–2006
GP2 Series	2005–2016
GP2 Asia Series	2008–2011
GP3 Series	2010–2018
Formula V8 3.5	2012–2016
F4 British Championship	2015–2021
Formula Renault Northern European Cup	2017–2018
FIA Formula 2 Championship	2017–2019
Formula Renault Eurocup	2017–2020
Formula Regional European Championship	2021–2023
Praga Cup	2022–2023

== Footnotes ==
Achievements
Preceded by Team Martello	Italian Formula 3000 Teams' Champion; 2000	Succeeded by Draco Junior Team
Preceded by Nordic Racing	International Formula 3000 Teams' Champion; 2002–2004	Succeeded by ART Grand Prix (GP2 Series)
Preceded by Fortec Motorsports (Formula Renault 3.5 Series)	Formula V8 3.5 Teams' Champion; 2016	Succeeded by Lotus
