= Giorgio Vinella =

Italian racing driver (born 1973)

- Nationality: (Italy) Italian
- Born: 22 August 1973 (age 53) Putignano (Italy)

Giorgio Vinella (born 22 August 1973 in Putignano) is an Italian racing driver.

== Career ==
Vinella began racing in the early 1990s driving go-kart in the 100cc National category. In 1993 he debuted with Henry Morrogh’s single-seater car. Vinella started racing in the British Formula Ford Championship.

In 1995, Vinella won races in the French Formula Ford Championship with his Vector 95, came second in the Formula Ford Festival and finished third in the European Championship. In 1996 and 1997 he moved to Formula Renault, and a year later joined the Coloni team in Formula 3000. In 1999, he won the Italian Formula 3000 championship with Team Martello. The victory in the championship allowed him to test the Minardi. In December 1999 at Circuito de Jerez, he earned the position of test driver for year 2000, performing aerodynamic testing at Mugello and Vairano Circuits. The same year, he raced for one event in Formula 3000 with Team Da Vinci, and one race for Riley & Scott in the Grand Am series at Elkhart Lake in United States with a Chevrolet engine.

After eight years of non racing, he returned to the 500 Italian Championship winning the race in Vallelunga.

In 2009, Vinella won the Italian Touring Car Endurance Championship with Marco Baroncini, driving a BMW 320i E36 run by Pai Technosport. In 2010, Vinella drove two races in Czech Republic in Brno and Most with a Porsche 996 GT3, tested the Audi R10 TDI with Team Kolles for candidacy of a seat for the 24 Hours of Le Mans, won his Class in the 6 hours of Misano, won a race at Mugello circuit in the Italian CITS with Roberto Ravaglia's ROAL Motorsport team. In late 2010, he finished third in the European Sports Prototype with the prototype Wolf of BF Motorsport Team. In 2011, he won a title in the Italian Endurance Touring Car Championship Ibiza Cup with Marco Baroncini, with four race wins and eight podium finishes.

After some years of absence from racing, Vinella got a great victory at the 3 hours of Imola with a Wolf prototype together with the Italian driver Luca Pirri, in the LP Racing Team. In 2021, he raced once in the Ferrari 458 GT Cup with the SR&R Team in the Italian 3 hours GT held in Mugello, finishing third.

Outside of racing, Vinella works as a driving instructor, driver coach, and has also developed an online course, Drivers Masterclass, to teach people to drive following driving techniques used by racing drivers.
