= Gabriele Lancieri =

Italian racing driver (born 1975)

- Nationality: (Italy) Italian
- Born: 17 January 1975 (age 51) Imola (Italy)
- Categorisation: FIA Silver (until 2018); FIA Bronze (2019–)

Championship titles
- 2004, 2006: Bologna Motorshow F3000 Sprint

Gabriele Lancieri (born 17 January 1975 in Imola) is an Italian racing driver. He has competed in such series as Euro/Italian Formula 3000, International GT Open, International Formula 3000 and the FIA GT Championship.

== Complete Italian/Euro Formula 3000 results ==
(key) (Races in bold indicate pole position; races in italics indicate fastest lap)

Year	Entrant	1	2	3	4	5	6	7	8	9	DC	Points
1999	Sighinolfi	VLL; 9	MNZ; 9	PER; 3	DON; 3	MIS; 10	MIS; 5	IMO; 4			7th	13
2000	Sighinolfi Autoracing	VLL; 1	MUG; 4	IMO; 2	MNZ; 5	VLL; 2	DON; 6	PER; 12	MIS; 15		**3rd**	**28**
2002	Sighinolfi Autoracing	VLL; 14	PER	MOZ; Ret	SPA	DON					NC	0
2002	Bieffe B&C Competition						BRN; 9	DIJ; DNS	JER; Ret	CAG; Ret	NC	0
2003	Uboldi Corse	NÜR	MAG	PER	MNZ; 5	SPA	DON	BRN	JER	CAG	15th	2
2005	Sighinolfi Autoracing	ADR	VAL	CHE	IMO	MUG	MAG	MNZ	MIS; 5		19th	4

== Complete International Formula 3000 results ==
Year	Entrant	1	2	3	4	5	6	7	8	9	10	11	12	DC	Points
2001	Durango Formula	INT; Ret	IMO; 13	CAT; Ret	A1R; 12	MON; Ret	NÜR; 14	MAG; 13	SIL; 10	HOC; 9	HUN; 9	SPA; 14	MNZ; Ret	22nd	0
