= 2000 Italian Formula 3000 Championship =

The 2000 Italian Formula 3000 Championship was contested over 8 rounds. 13 different teams, 40 different drivers competed. In this one-make formula all teams had to utilize Lola T96/50 chassis with Zytek engines.

The scoring system for this season was 10-6-4-3-2-1 points awarded to the first six classified finishers.

== Entries ==
Team	No.	Driver	Rounds
(Italy) Da Vinci Team	1	(Colombia) Giandomenico Brusatin	1-3
(Italy) Da Vinci Team	1	(South Africa) Tomas Scheckter	4
(Italy) Da Vinci Team	1	(Italy) Giorgio Vinella	5
(Italy) Da Vinci Team	1	(United Kingdom) Mark Shaw	6
(Italy) Da Vinci Team	2	(United States) Derek Hill	1-6
(Italy) Da Vinci Team	2	(Italy) Massimo Comelli	8
Monaco Motorsport	5	(Portugal) Manuel Gião	All
Monaco Motorsport	6	(Italy) Gianluca Calcagni	All
(Italy) GP Racing	7	(Italy) Thomas Biagi	All
(Italy) GP Racing	8	(Switzerland) Gabriele Gardel	All
(Italy) Sighinolfi Autoracing	9	(Italy) Gabriele Lancieri	All
(Italy) Sighinolfi Autoracing	10	(Italy) Michele Spoldi	1-4
(Italy) Sighinolfi Autoracing	10	(Germany) Sascha Bert	5-8
(Italy) Durango Benetton Junior Team	11	(Australia) Andrej Pavicevic	1-7
(Italy) Durango Benetton Junior Team	11	(France) Soheil Ayari	8
(Italy) Durango Benetton Junior Team	12	(Italy) Giovanni Montanari	1-3
(Italy) Durango Benetton Junior Team	12	(United Kingdom) Dino Morelli	4
(Italy) Durango Benetton Junior Team	12	(Italy) Michele Spoldi	5-8
(Italy) Team Ghinzani	14	(Sweden) Peter Sundberg	1-2
(Italy) Team Ghinzani	14	(Italy) Marco de Iturbe	3
(Italy) Team Ghinzani	14	(Spain) Ángel Burgueño	4
(Italy) Team Ghinzani	14	(Italy) Gabriele Varano	5-8
(Italy) Team Ghinzani	15	(Italy) Luca Vacis	All
(Italy) ADM Competizione	16	(Brazil) Ricardo Sperafico	All
(Italy) ADM Competizione	17	(Italy) Paolo Ruberti	1-3
(Italy) ADM Competizione	17	(Italy) Salvatore Tavano	4-7
(Italy) ADM Competizione	17	(South Africa) Tomas Scheckter	8
(Italy) Traini Corse	18	(Italy) "Babalus"	All
(Italy) Traini Corse	19	(Greece) Nikolaus Stremmenos	1-4
(Italy) Traini Corse	19	(Italy) Angelo Lancelotti	5-6
(Italy) Traini Corse	19	(Italy) Marco Cioci	8
(United Kingdom) Arden Team Russia	20	(Russia) Viktor Maslov	1-6
(United Kingdom) Arden Team Russia	20	(United Kingdom) Darren Manning	7-8
(United Kingdom) Arden Team Russia	21	(United Kingdom) Warren Hughes	All
(Italy) Draco Junior Team	22	(Brazil) Rodrigo Sperafico	All
(Italy) Draco Junior Team	23	(Brazil) Leonardo Nienkötter	All
(Italy) Orbit Motorsport	24	(Germany) Sascha Bert	1-3
(Italy) Orbit Motorsport	25	(Italy) Danilo Rossi	1-3
(Italy) B&C Competition	28	(Italy) Salvatore Tavano	1-3
(Italy) B&C Competition	29	(Italy) Stefano Comandini	1-2
(Italy) B&C Competition	29	(Brazil) Marcelo Battistuzzi	3
(Italy) B&C Competition	29	(Austria) Thomas Bleiner	4
Monaco Motorsport Junior Team	30	(France) Yann Goudy	All
Monaco Motorsport Junior Team	31	(Brazil) Marcelo Battistuzzi	1-2
Monaco Motorsport Junior Team	31	(Italy) Paolo Montin	3
Monaco Motorsport Junior Team	31	(Italy) Danilo Rossi	4-8

== Calendar ==
Round	Circuit/Location	Date	Laps	Distance	Time	Speed
1	(Italy) ACI Vallelunga Circuit	2 April	32	3.228=103.296 km	0'38:37.486	160.462 km/h
2	(Italy) Mugello Circuit	16 April	20	5.245=104.9 km	0'38:34.389	163.170 km/h
3	(Italy) Autodromo Enzo e Dino Ferrari, Imola	14 May	21	4.933=103.593 km	0'35:43.155	174.012 km/h
4	(Italy) Autodromo Nazionale Monza	25 June	18	5.793=104.274 km	0'30:12.705	207.086 km/h
5	(Italy) ACI Vallelunga Circuit	23 July	32	3.228=103.296 km	0'35:19.101	175.483 km/h
6	(United Kingdom) Donington Park	6 August	?	? km	0'37:16.669	? km/h
NC	(Netherlands) Assen	20 August	did not count for the championship			
7	(Italy) Autodromo di Pergusa	9 September	21	4.950=103.95 km	0'33:18.404	187.259 km/h
8	(Italy) Misano Circuit	22 October	?	? km	0'33:48.550	? km/h

== Results ==
Round	Circuit/Location	Pole position	Fastest lap	Winner	Winning team
1	(Italy) ACI Vallelunga Circuit	(Australia) Andrej Pavicevic	(Italy) Gabriele Lancieri	(Italy) Gabriele Lancieri	(Italy) Sighinolfi Autosport
2	(Italy) Mugello Circuit	(Brazil) Ricardo Sperafico	(Brazil) Ricardo Sperafico	(Brazil) Ricardo Sperafico	(Italy) ADM Competizione
3	(Italy) Autodromo Enzo e Dino Ferrari, Imola	(United Kingdom) Warren Hughes	(United Kingdom) Warren Hughes	(United Kingdom) Warren Hughes	(United Kingdom) Arden Team Russia
4	(Italy) Autodromo Nazionale Monza	(Brazil) Rodrigo Sperafico	(United Kingdom) Warren Hughes	(United Kingdom) Warren Hughes	(United Kingdom) Arden Team Russia
5	(Italy) ACI Vallelunga Circuit	(Brazil) Ricardo Sperafico	(Italy) Thomas Biagi	(Brazil) Ricardo Sperafico	(Italy) ADM Competizione
6	(United Kingdom) Donington Park	(Brazil) Ricardo Sperafico	(Italy) Thomas Biagi	(Brazil) Ricardo Sperafico	(Italy) ADM Competizione
NC	(Netherlands) Assen	did not count for the championship			
7	(Italy) Autodromo di Pergusa	(United Kingdom) Darren Manning	(United Kingdom) Darren Manning	(United Kingdom) Darren Manning	(United Kingdom) Arden Team Russia
8	(Italy) Misano Circuit	(Brazil) Ricardo Sperafico	(United Kingdom) Warren Hughes	(Brazil) Ricardo Sperafico	(Italy) ADM Competizione

Note

Race 5 Pole Position originally won by (Italy) Thomas Biagi, but all his times were cancelled and he started from last grid position.

== Championships standings ==
Pos	Driver	VLL (Italy)	MUG (Italy)	IMO (Italy)	MNZ (Italy)	VLL (Italy)	DON (United Kingdom)	PER (Italy)	MIS (Italy)	Pts
1	(Brazil) Ricardo Sperafico	19	1	4	Ret	1	1	4	1	46
2	(United Kingdom) Warren Hughes	3	8	1	1	Ret	2	6	2	37
3	(Italy) Gabriele Lancieri	1	4	2	5	2	6	12	15	28
4	(Brazil) Rodrigo Sperafico	2	6	3	3	6	4	8	4	22
5	(Italy) Thomas Biagi	4	2	11	11	16	5	3	10	15
6	(United Kingdom) Darren Manning							1	3	14
7	(Italy) Gianluca Calcagni	15	10	6	4	5	Ret	2	7	12
8	(Portugal) Manuel Gião	6	Ret	5	6	Ret	3	5	18	10
9	(Italy) "Babalus"	Ret	3	18	Ret	3	Ret	Ret	8	8
10	(South Africa) Tomas Scheckter				2				Ret	6
11	(Italy) Gabriele Varano					4	Ret	Ret	12	3
12	(Brazil) Marcelo Battistuzzi	5	9	12						2
13	(Italy) Giovanni Montanari	11	5	Ret						2
14	(France) Soheil Ayari								5	2
15	(Italy) Michele Spoldi	Ret	11	Ret	8	10	10	Ret	6	1
-	(Germany) Sascha Bert	9	7	14		9	7	10	16	0
-	(Brazil) Leonardo Nienkötter	18	Ret	9	7	7	13	Ret	9	0
-	(Italy) Danilo Rossi	Ret	16	7	9	12	12	13	17	0
-	(Italy) Salvatore Tavano	13	20	Ret	14	13	15	7		0
-	(Russia) Viktor Maslov	7	18	Ret	15	Ret	16			0
-	(United States) Derek Hill	Ret	13	8	Ret	11	8			0
-	(France) Yann Goudy	8	15	Ret	12	18	14	Ret	Ret	0
-	(Australia) Andrej Pavicevic	20	Ret	17	Ret	8	Ret	Ret		0
-	(Switzerland) Gabriele Gardel	10	17	Ret	17	Ret	11	9	11	0
-	(United Kingdom) Mark Shaw						9			0
-	(Italy) Paolo Ruberti	14	12	10						0
-	(Spain) Ángel Burgueño				10					0
-	(Italy) Luca Vacis	16	Ret	16	Ret	14	Ret	11	14	0
-	(Colombia) Giandomenico Brusatin	12	19	13						0
-	(Greece) Nikolaus Stremmenos	17	Ret	15	13					0
-	(Italy) Marco Cioci								13	0
-	(Italy) Stefano Comandini	Ret	14							0
-	(Italy) Angelo Lancelotti					15	Ret			0
-	(Austria) Thomas Blainer				16					0
-	(Italy) Giorgio Vinella					17				0
-	(United Kingdom) Dino Morelli				Ret					0
-	(Italy) Massimo Comelli								Ret	0
-	(Sweden) Peter Sundberg	Ret	Ret							0
-	(Italy) Paolo Montin			DNS						0
-	(Italy) Marco de Iturbe			DNS						0
Pos	Driver	VLL (Italy)	MUG (Italy)	IMO (Italy)	MNZ (Italy)	VLL (Italy)	DON (United Kingdom)	PER (Italy)	MIS (Italy)	Pts

Colour	Result
Gold	Winner
Silver	Second place
Bronze	Third place
Green	Points classification
Blue	Non-points classification
Blue	Non-classified finish (NC)
Purple	Retired, not classified (Ret)
Red	Did not qualify (DNQ)
Red	Did not pre-qualify (DNPQ)
Black	Disqualified (DSQ)
White	Did not start (DNS)
White	Withdrew (WD)
White	Race cancelled (C)
Blank	Did not practice (DNP)
Blank	Did not arrive (DNA)
Blank	Excluded (EX)
