= Viktor Maslov (racing driver) =

Russian racing driver

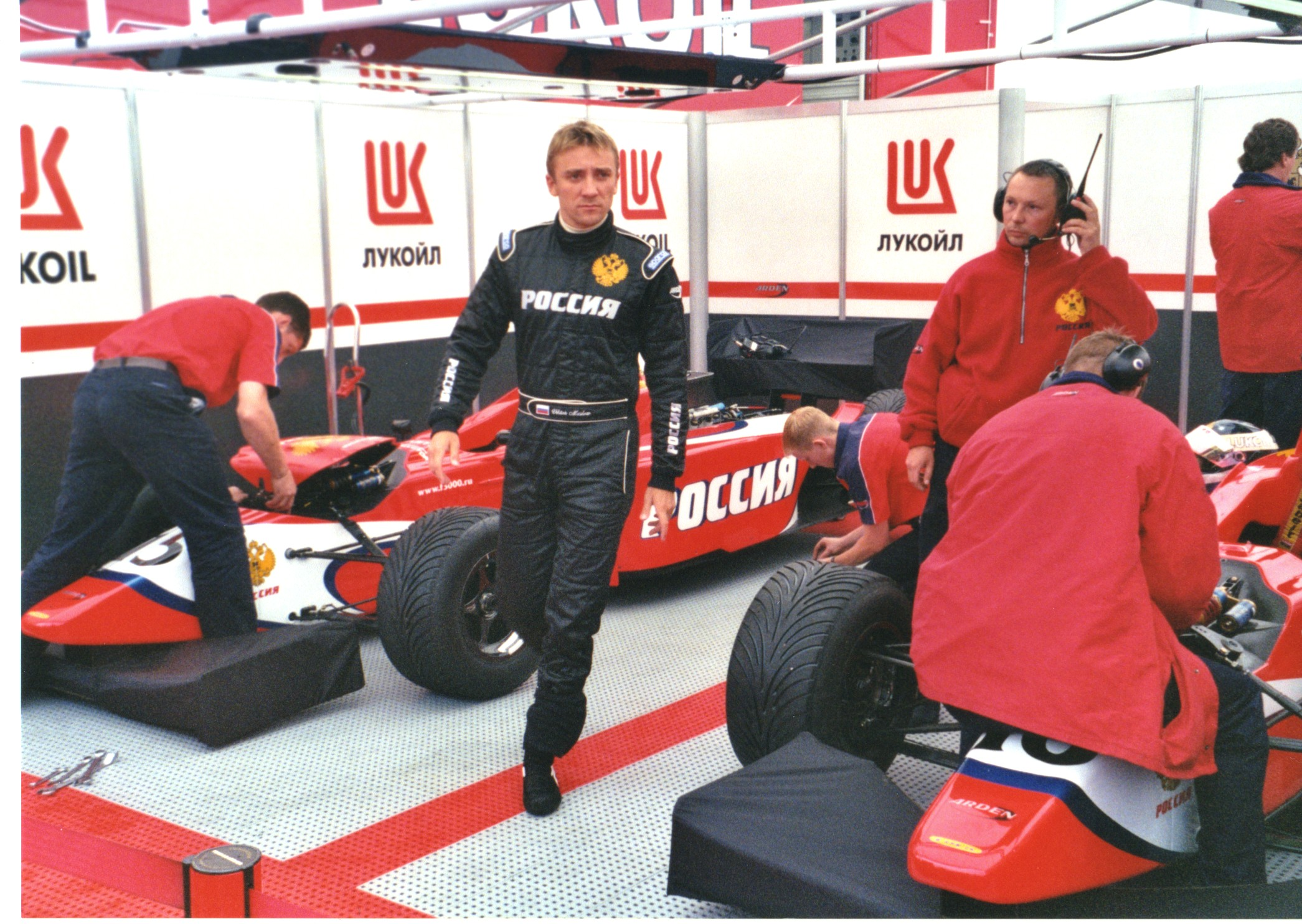
- Viktor Maslov leaving the LUKoil Arden paddock during the 2001 Silverstone event.
- Nationality: Russian
- Born: Viktor Vladimirovich Maslov; 16 January 1976 (age 50) Surgut, RSFSR, Soviet Union

Previous series
- 1999-01 1999-00 1999 1998 1996-97: International Formula 3000; Italian Formula 3000; Sports Racing World Cup; Italian Formula Three; Russian Formula Three

Viktor Vladimirovich Maslov (Russian: Виктор Владимирович Маслов; born on 16 January 1976 in Surgut) is a Russian race car driver. Maslov spent six years in top-level karting, debuting in 1989, before competing in the premier ice racing event Trophy Andros in 1996. In 1996, Maslov also competed in Russian Formula Three. In 1997, Maslov again competed in both categories, staying with the Daewoo team in Andros, before landing a 1998 seat with Italian Formula Three team Lukoil.

Maslov joined Arden Motorsport in 1999, driving for the team in both Italian Formula 3000 and International Formula 3000 supported by Lukoil, where he had family connections as well as other Russian businessmen. He continued to do the same until 2001, when he drove in Formula 3000 only. He left Arden at the end of 2001 and retired from racing. He later became a yacht designer.

== Racing record ==
=== Career summary ===
Season	Series	Team	Races	Wins	Poles	F/Laps	Podiums	Points	Position
1996	Russian Formula Three	?	?	?	?	?	?	?	?
1997	Russian Formula Three	?	?	?	?	?	?	?	2
1998	Italian Formula Three Championship	Lukoil	9	0	0	0	0	0	NC
1999	International Formula 3000	Lukoil Arden	0	0	0	0	0	0	NC
1999	Italian Formula 3000	Lukoil Arden	2	0	0	0	0	1	18th
1999	Sports Racing World Cup	Simpson Engineering	1	0	0	0	0	0	NC
2000	International Formula 3000	Arden Team Russia	5	0	0	0	0	0	NC
2000	Italian Formula 3000	Arden Team Russia	6	0	0	0	0	0	NC
2001	International Formula 3000	Arden Team Russia	12	0	0	0	0	0	NC

=== Complete International Formula 3000 results ===
(key) (Races in bold indicate pole position) (Races in italics indicate fastest lap)

Year	Entrant	1	2	3	4	5	6	7	8	9	10	11	12	DC	Points
1999	Lukoil Arden	IMO; DNQ	MON; DNQ	CAT; DNQ	MAG; DNQ	SIL; DNQ	A1R; DNQ	HOC; DNQ	HUN; DNQ	SPA; DNQ	NÜR; DNQ			NC	0
2000	Arden Team Russia	IMO; DNQ	SIL; Ret	CAT; 18	NÜR; DNQ	MON; Ret	MAG; DNQ	A1R; Ret	HOC; 15	HUN; DNQ	SPA; DNQ			NC	0
2001	Arden Team Russia	INT; Ret	IMO; 10	CAT; 12	A1R; 11	MON; 10	NUR; 17	MAG; 18	SIL; 16	HOC; 14	HUN; Ret	SPA; 18	MNZ; 14	NC	0
