= Marcelo Battistuzzi =

Brazilian racing driver

- Nationality: Brazilian
- Born: July 20, 1976 (age 50) São Paulo, Brazil

Championship titles
- 1997 1997: German Formula Opel; European Formula Opel

Marcelo Battistuzzi (born July 20, 1976) is a Brazilian racing driver. He has raced in such series as International Formula 3000 and Italian Formula 3000. He won both the German Formula Opel and European Formula Opel championships in 1997.
