= 2009 Bahrain 1st Speedcar Series round =

The Grand Prix layout of the Bahrain International Circuit

The 2009 Bahrain 1st Speedcar Series round was a Speedcar Series motor race held on 23 and 24 January 2009 at Bahrain International Circuit in Sakhir, Bahrain. It was the second round of the 2008–09 Speedcar Series.

== Classification ==
=== Qualifying ===
Pos.	No.	Driver	Team	Time	Gap	Grid
1	80	(Germany) Heinz-Harald Frentzen	Team Lavaggi	2:07.082		1
2	10	(Italy) Gianni Morbidelli	Palm Beach	2:07.260	+0.178	2
3	27	(France) Jean Alesi	HPR	2:07.334	+0.252	3
4	20	(Italy) Vitantonio Liuzzi	Union Properties Team	2:07.413	+0.331	4
5	69	(United Kingdom) Johnny Herbert	JMB Racing	2:07.518	+0.436	5
6	85	(United Arab Emirates) Hasher Al Maktoum	Union Properties	2:08.312	+1.230	6
7	50	(Hong Kong) Marchy Lee	HPR	2:08.521	+1.439	7
8	96	(Canada) Jacques Villeneuve	Durango	2:08.715	+1.633	8
9	04	(Italy) Thomas Biagi	Durango	2:09.104	+2.022	9
10	13	(France) Damien Pasini	JMB Racing	2:09.606	+2.524	10
11	25	(Austria) Christopher Zoechling	Durango	2:09.820	+2.738	11
12	90	(Italy) Giovanni Lavaggi	Team Siram/Team Barwa	2:10.224	+3.142	12
13	09	(Italy) Enzo Panacci	Continental Circus	2:13.066	+5.984	13
14	32	(France) Eric Charles	Continental Circus	2:13.992	+6.910	14
15	21	(United Kingdom) Chris Buncombe	Team Lavaggi	No time		15

=== Race 1 ===
Pos.	No.	Driver	Team	Laps	Time/Retired	Grid	Points
1	27	(France) Jean Alesi	HPR	19	40:37.701	3	10
2	80	(Germany) Heinz-Harald Frentzen	Team Lavaggi	19	+1.409	1	8
3	69	(United Kingdom) Johnny Herbert	JMB Racing	19	+14.481	5	6
4	10	(Italy) Gianni Morbidelli	Palm Beach	19	+22.510	2	5
5	85	(United Arab Emirates) Hasher Al Maktoum	Union Properties Team	19	+24.050	6	4
6	04	(Italy) Thomas Biagi	Palm Beach	19	+24.975	9	3
7	13	(France) Damien Pasini	JMB Racing	19	+49.126	10	2
8	90	(Italy) Giovanni Lavaggi	Team Siram/Team Barwa	19	+1:03.625	12	1
9	13	(United Kingdom) Chris Buncombe	Team Lavaggi	19	+1:07.026	15	
10	96	(Canada) Jacques Villeneuve	Durango	19	+1:20.766	8	
11	32	(France) Eric Charles	Continental Circus	18	+1 lap	14	
Ret	50	(Hong Kong) Marchy Lee	HPR	11	Retired	7	
Ret	20	(Italy) Vitantonio Liuzzi	Union Properties Team	9	Retired	4	
DNS	25	(Austria) Christopher Zoechling	Durango	0	Did not start	11	
DNS	09	(Italy) Enzo Panacci	Continental Circus	0	Did not start	13	

=== Race 2 ===
Pos.	No.	Driver	Team	Laps	Time/Retired	Grid	Points
1	69	(United Kingdom) Johnny Herbert	JMB Racing	19	40:36.124	6	10
2	10	(Italy) Gianni Morbidelli	Palm Beach	19	+2.560	5	8
3	04	(Italy) Thomas Biagi	Palm Beach	19	+6.711	3	6
4	80	(Germany) Heinz-Harald Frentzen	Team Lavaggi	19	+14.668	7	5
5	13	(France) Damien Pasini	JMB Racing	19	+20.253	2	4
6	27	(France) Jean Alesi	HPR	19	+20.920	8	3
7	85	(United Arab Emirates) Hasher Al Maktoum	Union Properties Team	19	+27.245	4	2
8	20	(Italy) Vitantonio Liuzzi	Union Properties Team	19	+32.735	13	1
9	13	(United Kingdom) Chris Buncombe	Team Lavaggi	19	+42.400	9	
10	90	(Italy) Giovanni Lavaggi	Team Siram/Team Barwa	19	+51.597	1	
11	32	(France) Eric Charles	Continental Circus	19	+1:37.688	11	
Ret	25	(Austria) Christopher Zoechling	Durango	10	Retired	14	
Ret	96	(Canada) Jacques Villeneuve	Durango	8	Retired	10	
Ret	50	(Hong Kong) Marchy Lee	HPR	7	Retired	12	
Ret	09	(Italy) Enzo Panacci	Continental Circus	2	Retired	15	

== See also ==
- 2009 Bahrain 1st GP2 Asia Series round
