= 2009 Bahrain 2nd Speedcar Series round =

Car racing series

The Grand Prix layout of the Bahrain International Circuit

The 2009 Bahrain 2nd Speedcar Series round was the fifth and final showdown of the 2008–09 Speedcar Series. It was held on 25 and 26 April 2009 at Bahrain International Circuit in Sakhir, Bahrain. The race supported the 2009 Bahrain Grand Prix.

== Classification ==
=== Qualifying ===
Pos.	No.	Driver	Team	Time	Gap	Grid
1	69	(United Kingdom) Johnny Herbert	JMB Racing	2:07.095		1
2	80	(Germany) Heinz-Harald Frentzen	Continental Circus	2:07.148	+0.053	2
3	27	(France) Jean Alesi	HPR	2:07.239	+0.144	3
4	20	(Italy) Vitantonio Liuzzi	Union Properties Team	2:07.556	+0.471	4
5	10	(Italy) Gianni Morbidelli	Palm Beach	2:07.738	+0.643	5
6	13	(France) Damien Pasini	JMB Racing	2:08.309	+1.214	6
7	26	(Austria) Christopher Zoechling	Continental Circus	2:08.464	+1.369	7
8	25	(France) David Terrien	West-Tec	2:08.558	+1.463	8
9	85	(United Arab Emirates) Hasher Al Maktoum	Union Properties	2:08.599	+1.504	9
10	21	(United Kingdom) Chris Buncombe	West-Tec	2:08.622	+1.527	10
11	50	(Hong Kong) Marchy Lee	HPR	2:08.690	+1.595	11
12	04	(Italy) Thomas Biagi	Durango	2:08.933	+1.838	12
13	71	(France) Nicolas Navarro	Durango	2:09.301	+2.206	13
14	96	(United Arab Emirates) Ramez Azzam	Scuderia Giudici	2:10.249	+3.154	14
15	21	(Italy) Marco Cioci	Durango	2:11.539	+4.444	15
16	09	(Italy) Gianni Giudici	Scuderia Giudici	2:13.399	+6.304	16

=== Race 1 ===
Pos.	No.	Driver	Team	Laps	Time/Retired	Grid	Points
1	69	(United Kingdom) Johnny Herbert	JMB Racing	19	40:59.350	1	10
2	80	(Germany) Heinz-Harald Frentzen	Team Lavaggi	19	+10.339	2	8
3	20	(Italy) Vitantonio Liuzzi	Union Properties Team	19	+12.545	4	6
4	26	(Austria) Christopher Zoechling	Durango	19	+20.396	7	5
5	10	(Italy) Gianni Morbidelli	Palm Beach	19	+23.398	5	4
6	85	(United Arab Emirates) Hasher Al Maktoum	Union Properties Team	19	+25.168	9	3
7	13	(France) Damien Pasini	JMB Racing	19	+26.539	6	2
8	04	(Italy) Thomas Biagi	Palm Beach	19	+34.563	12	1
9	71	(France) Nicolas Navarro	Durango	19	+39.483	13	
10	96	(United Arab Emirates) Ramez Azzam	Scuderia Giudici	19	+46.854	14	
11	32	(Italy) Marco Cioci	Durango	19	+1:01.776	15	
12	50	(Hong Kong) Marchy Lee	HPR	18	+1 Lap	11	
Ret	44	(France) David Terrien	West-Tec	12	DNF	8	
Ret	09	(Italy) Gianni Giudici	Scuderia Giudici	11	DNF	16	
Ret	21	(United Kingdom) Chris Buncombe	West-Tec	9	DNF	10	
Ret	27	(France) Jean Alesi	HPR	4	DNF	3	

=== Race 2 ===
Pos.	No.	Driver	Team	Laps	Time/Retired	Grid	Points
1	20	(Italy) Vitantonio Liuzzi	Union Properties Team	19	41:02.174	6	10
2	04	(Italy) Thomas Biagi	Palm Beach	19	+3.453	1	8
3	85	(United Arab Emirates) Hasher Al Maktoum	Union Properties Team	19	+4.936	3	6
4	71	(France) Nicolas Navarro	Durango	19	+10.277	9	5
5	10	(Italy) Gianni Morbidelli	Palm Beach	19	+12.117	4	4
6	69	(United Kingdom) Johnny Herbert	JMB Racing	19	+12.464	8	3
7	21	(United Kingdom) Chris Buncombe	West-Tec	19	+19.899	15	2
8	26	(Austria) Christopher Zoechling	Durango	19	+22.644	5	1
9	50	(Hong Kong) Marchy Lee	HPR	19	+29.194	12	
10	27	(France) Jean Alesi	HPR	19	+35.462	16	
11	32	(Italy) Marco Cioci	Durango	19	+44.595	11	
12	80	(Germany) Heinz-Harald Frentzen	Team Lavaggi	19	+52.811	7	
Ret	13	(France) Damien Pasini	JMB Racing	12	DNF	2	
Ret	44	(France) David Terrien	West-Tec	11	DNF	13	
Ret	96	(United Arab Emirates) Ramez Azzam	Scuderia Giudici	7	DNF	10	
Ret	09	(Italy) Gianni Giudici	Scuderia Giudici	7	DNF	14	

== See also ==
- 2009 Bahrain Grand Prix
- 2009 Bahrain 2nd GP2 Asia Series round
