= 2009 UAE Speedcar Series round =

The layout of the Dubai Autodrome

The 2009 UAE Speedcar Series round was a Speedcar Series motor race held on 27 and 28 February 2009 at Dubai Autodrome in Dubai, United Arab Emirates. It was the fourth round of the 2008–09 Speedcar Series.

== Classification ==
=== Qualifying ===
Pos.	No.	Driver	Team	Time	Gap	Grid
1	26	(Austria) Christopher Zöchling	Continental Circus	1:41.754		1
2	27	(France) Jean Alesi	HPR	1:41.962	+0.208	2
3	20	(Italy) Vitantonio Liuzzi	Union Properties	1:41.979	+0.225	3
4	80	(Germany) Heinz-Harald Frentzen	Team Lavaggi	1:42.044	+0.290	4
5	85	(United Arab Emirates) Hasher Al Maktoum	Union Properties	1:42.067	+0.313	5
6	10	(Italy) Gianni Morbidelli	Palm Beach	1:42.129	+0.375	6
7	69	(United Kingdom) Johnny Herbert	JMB Racing	1:42.237	+0.483	7
8	44	(France) David Terrien	Durango	1:42.368	+0.614	8
9	33	(Italy) Marco Melandri	Team Lavaggi	1:42.790	+1.036	9
10	13	(France) Damien Pasini	JMB Racing	1:43.019	+1.265	10
11	04	(Italy) Thomas Biagi	Palm Beach	1:43.426	+1.672	11
12	50	(Hong Kong) Marchy Lee	HPR	1:44.302	+2.548	12
13	25	(Bahrain) Hamad Al Fardan	Durango	1:44.400	+2.646	13
14	32	(France) Eric Charles	Continental Circus	1:47.543	+5.789	14

=== Race 1 ===
Pos.	No.	Driver	Team	Laps	Time/Retired	Grid	Points
1	27	(France) Jean Alesi	HPR	24	41:15.994	2	10
2	26	(Austria) Christopher Zöchling	Continental Circus	24	+0.703	1	8
3	80	(Germany) Heinz-Harald Frentzen	Team Lavaggi	24	+11.222	4	6
4	44	(France) David Terrien	Durango	24	+11.778	8	5
5	69	(United Kingdom) Johnny Herbert	JMB Racing	24	+16.478	7	4
6	85	(United Arab Emirates) Hasher Al Maktoum	Union Properties	24	+17.829	5	3
7	10	(Italy) Gianni Morbidelli	Palm Beach	24	+34.677	6	2
8	13	(France) Damien Pasini	JMB Racing	24	+38.057	10	1
9	04	(Italy) Thomas Biagi	Palm Beach	24	+39.882	11	
10	33	(Italy) Marco Melandri	Team Lavaggi	24	+50.412	9	
11	50	(Hong Kong) Marchy Lee	HPR	24	+53.845	12	
12	20	(Italy) Vitantonio Liuzzi	Union Properties	23	+1 lap	3	
13	25	(Bahrain) Hamad Al Fardan	Durango	22	+2 laps	13	
14	32	(France) Eric Charles	Continental Circus	19	+5 laps	14	

=== Race 2 ===
Pos.	No.	Driver	Team	Laps	Time/Retired	Grid	Points
1	27	(France) Jean Alesi	HPR	24	41:26.780	8	10
2	10	(Italy) Gianni Morbidelli	Palm Beach	24	+3.839	2	8
3	69	(United Kingdom) Johnny Herbert	JMB Racing	24	+5.608	4	6
4	80	(Germany) Heinz-Harald Frentzen	Team Lavaggi	24	+7.187	6	5
5	44	(France) David Terrien	Durango	24	+12.883	5	4
6	04	(Italy) Thomas Biagi	Palm Beach	24	+18.160	9	3
7	50	(Hong Kong) Marchy Lee	HPR	24	+25.441	11	2
8	33	(Italy) Marco Melandri	Team Lavaggi	24	+35.281	10	1
9	13	(France) Damien Pasini	JMB Racing	24	+41.962	1	
10	26	(Austria) Christopher Zöchling	Continental Circus	24	+1:41.270	7	
11	85	(United Arab Emirates) Ramez Azzam	Union Properties	23	+1 lap	15	
12	32	(France) Eric Charles	Continental Circus	23	+1 lap	14	
Ret	25	(Bahrain) Hamad Al Fardan	Durango	7	DNF	13	
Ret	20	(Italy) Vitantonio Liuzzi	Union Properties	4	DNF	12	
