= 2008 UAE 3rd Speedcar Series round =

- Race 1 of 5 in the 2008–09 Speedcar Series

Race details
- Date: 5 December 2008
- Course: Permanent racing facility
- Course length: 5.390 km (3.349 miles)
- Distance: 16 laps, 86.24 km ( miles)

Pole position
Driver	(Italy) Vitantonio Liuzzi	Union Properties
- Time: 2:04.680

Fastest lap
Driver	(Germany) Heinz-Harald Frentzen	Phoenix Racing
- Time: 2:05.910 on lap 15

Podium
First	(Italy) Vitantonio Liuzzi	Union Properties
Second	(Germany) Heinz-Harald Frentzen	Phoenix Racing
Third	(Italy) Gianni Morbidelli	Palm Beach

The 2008 UAE 3rd Speedcar Series round was a Speedcar Series motor race held on 5 and 6 December 2008 at Dubai Autodrome in Dubai, United Arab Emirates. It was the first round of the 2008–09 Speedcar Series.

== Classification ==
=== Qualifying ===
Pos.	No.	Driver	Team	Time	Gap	Grid
1	20	(Italy) Vitantonio Liuzzi	Union Properties	2:04.680		1
2	80	(Germany) Heinz-Harald Frentzen	Phoenix Racing	2:05.134	+0.454	2
3	25	(Austria) Christopher Zoechling	Durango	2:05.380	+0.700	3
4	27	(France) Jean Alesi	HPR	2:05.580	+0.900	4
5	10	(Italy) Gianni Morbidelli	Palm Beach	2:05.630	+0.950	5
6	21	(Austria) Mathias Lauda	Phoenix Racing	2:06.120	+1.440	6
7	85	(United Arab Emirates) Hasher Al Maktoum	Union Properties	2:06.218	+1.538	7
8	07	(Sweden) Stefan Johansson	Palm Beach	2:06.439	+1.759	8
9	69	(United Kingdom) Johnny Herbert	JMB Racing	2:06.668	+1.988	9
10	13	(France) Damien Pasini	JMB Racing	2:06.742	+2.062	10
11	09	(Germany) Marcel Tiemann	Continental Circus	2:06.948	+2.268	11
12	50	(Hong Kong) Marchy Lee	HPR	2:07.060	+2.380	12
13	96	(Canada) Jacques Villeneuve	Durango	2:07.282	+2.602	13
14	32	(France) Eric Charles	Continental Circus	2:13.022	+8.432	14

=== Race 1 ===
Pos.	No.	Driver	Team	Laps	Time/Retired	Grid	Points
1	20	(Italy) Vitantonio Liuzzi	Union Properties	16	40:55.976	1	10
2	80	(Germany) Heinz-Harald Frentzen	Phoenix Racing	16	+0.839	2	8
3	10	(Italy) Gianni Morbidelli	Palm Beach	16	+3.091	5	6
4	69	(United Kingdom) Johnny Herbert	JMB Racing	16	+12.858	9	5
5	85	(United Arab Emirates) Hasher Al Maktoum	Union Properties	16	+15.815	7	4
6	96	(Canada) Jacques Villeneuve	Durango	16	+34.741	13	3
7	50	(Hong Kong) Marchy Lee	HPR	16	+40.868	12	2
8	13	(France) Damien Pasini	JMB Racing	16	+1:18.517	10	1
9	32	(Germany) Eric Charles	Continental Circus	16	+1:37.722	14	
10	27	(France) Jean Alesi	HPR	16	+1:51.563	4	
11	25	(Austria) Christopher Zoechling	Durango	15	+1 Lap	3	
Ret	09	(Germany) Marcel Tiemann	Continental Circus	11	DNF	11	
Ret	07	(Sweden) Stefan Johansson	Palm Beach	11	DNF	8	
Ret	21	(Austria) Mathias Lauda	Phoenix Racing	4	DNF	6	

=== Race 2 ===
The race 2 was cancelled due to flooding due to heavy rainfall.

== Standings after the event ==
Drivers' Championship standings

Pos.	Driver	Points
1	(Italy) Vitantonio Liuzzi	10
2	(Germany) Heinz-Harald Frentzen	8
3	(Italy) Gianni Morbidelli	6
4	(United Kingdom) Johnny Herbert	5
5	(United Arab Emirates) Hasher Al Maktoum	4

Teams' Championship standings

Pos.	Team	Points
1	(United Arab Emirates) Union Properties	14
2	(Germany) Phoenix Racing	8
3	(United States) Palm Beach	6
4	(Monaco) JMB Racing	6
5	(Italy) Durango	3

- Note: Only the top five positions are included for both sets of standings.

== See also ==
- 2008 UAE 3rd GP2 Asia Series round
