= Vitantonio Liuzzi =

Italian racing driver (born 1980)

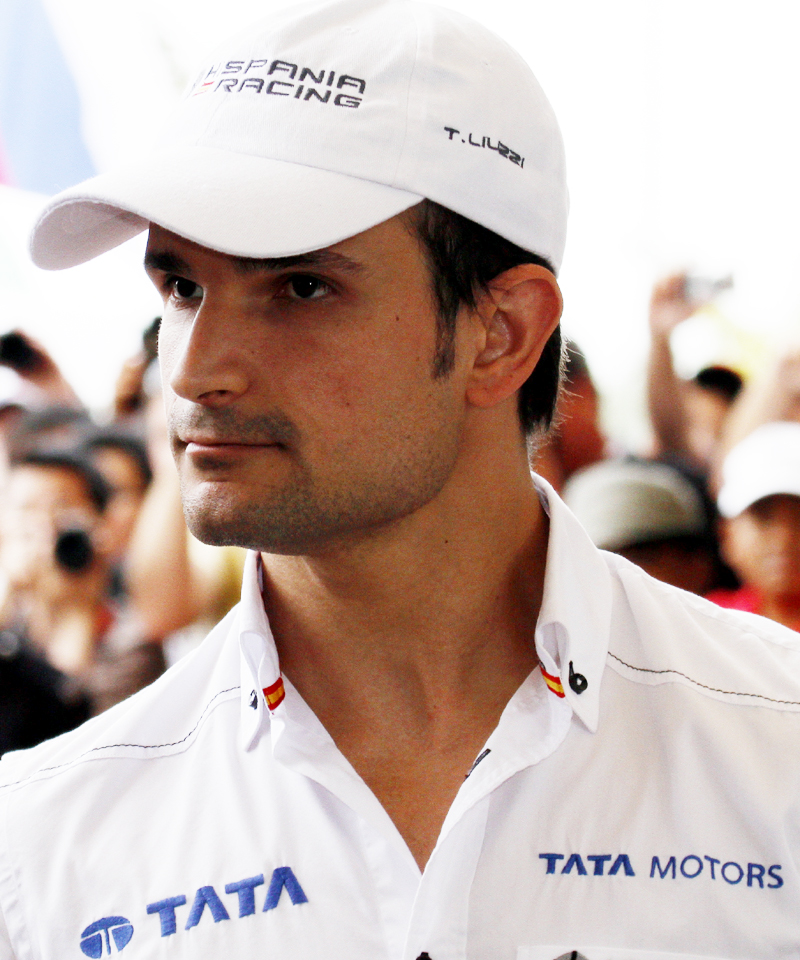
- Liuzzi at the 2011 Malaysian Grand Prix
- Born: 6 August 1980 (age 46); Locorotondo, Bari, Italy
- Spouse: Francesca Caldarelli (m. 2012)
- Children: 1
- Relatives: Andrea Caldarelli (brother-in-law)

Formula One World Championship career
- Nationality: (Italy) Italian
- Active years: 2005–2007, 2009–2011
- Team(s): Red Bull, Toro Rosso, Force India, HRT
- Entries: 81 (80 starts)
- Championships: 0
- Wins: 0
- Podiums: 0
- Career points: 26
- Pole positions: 0
- Fastest laps: 0
- First entry: 2005 San Marino Grand Prix
- Last entry: 2011 Brazilian Grand Prix

Previous series
- 2017 2015 2015 2012–2013, 2015 2014 2014 2012–2013 2009 2008–2009 2003–2004 2002 2002: International GT Open; Formula E GT Asia Series; FIA WEC; Super Formula; Super GT; Superstars Series; A1 Grand Prix; Speedcar Series; International F3000; German F3; German Formula Renault

Championship titles
- 2004: International F3000

Vitantonio "Tonio" Liuzzi (born 6 August 1980) (Note: Liuzzi's year of birth is disputed; some sources identify it as 1980, whereas other sources identify it as 1981.) is an Italian former racing driver who competed in Formula One from 2005 to 2011.

Born and raised in Bari, Liuzzi began competitive kart racing aged nine. After a successful karting career—culminating in his victory at the World Championship in 2001—Liuzzi graduated to junior formulae with Red Bull backing. He won the 2004 International Formula 3000 Championship for Arden. Between 2005 and 2011, Liuzzi competed in Formula One for Red Bull, Toro Rosso, Force India and HRT, scoring 26 championship points across six seasons. He later raced in Formula E, Super Formula and WEC.

== Karting ==
Born in Locorotondo, Bari, Apulia, Liuzzi, like many auto racing drivers, began his career in kart racing (at the age of nine). He won the 1993 Italian Karting Championship, and in 1995 took second in the Karting World Championship and placed fifth in the European Championship. He won the Karting World Championship in 2001. He beat Formula One champion Michael Schumacher at Kerpen, Schumacher's 'home' track.

== Formula Renault, F3 and F3000 ==
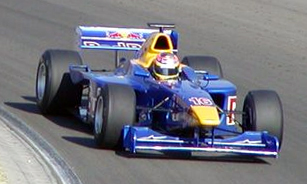
Liuzzi driving for the Red Bull Junior Team at the Hungary round of the 2003 International Formula 3000 season

Liuzzi then moved to cars, finishing second in the 2001 German Formula Renault Championship. Racing in the German Formula Three Championship, in 2002, he joined the Red Bull Junior Team, finishing in ninth place. That same year he won the Imola International F3 race and had test drives for the Coloni Formula 3000 team and Williams, the Formula One constructor. Red Bull hired Liuzzi for the 2003 F3000 season, in which he finished fourth. He moved to the Arden team for the following F3000 season and won seven of the ten races, securing the title with one race left.

== Formula One (2005–2012) ==
=== Winter 2004 Formula One speculation ===
Liuzzi's performance in Formula 3000 led to speculation that Ferrari might employ him, either as a test driver at their Formula One team, or at Sauber, the Formula One team that Ferrari had a close association with as its longtime engine supplier. He did have a test drive with Sauber in September 2004, but shortly before he tested they announced they had signed former World Champion Jacques Villeneuve to a two-year contract. In November 2004, Liuzzi was given a test drive by Red Bull, who hired him for 2005 in January.

=== Red Bull (2005) ===
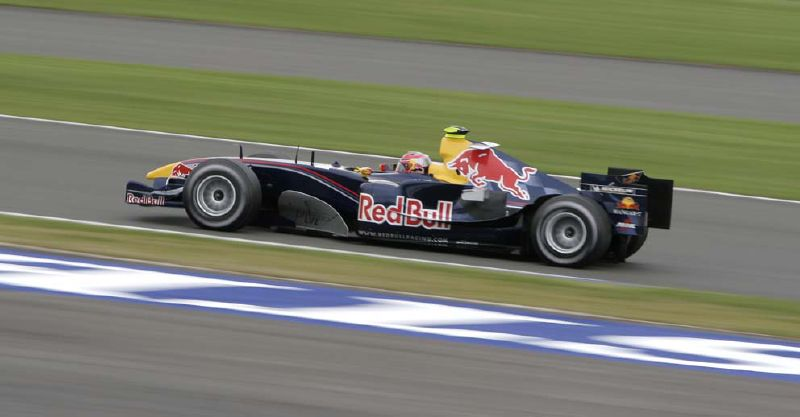
Liuzzi driving the third Red Bull Racing car during practice for the 2005 British Grand Prix

Initially it seemed that he might be given the seat along with David Coulthard, but Red Bull chose Christian Klien, leaving Liuzzi as the test driver. Despite good performances by Klien in the first three races, Red Bull abided by an agreement they made before the season that both he and Klien would be able to race. Liuzzi would replace Klien for the San Marino, Spanish and Monaco Grands Prix. Liuzzi scored his maiden point on his debut after both BAR drivers were disqualified at San Marino. Following the Spanish Grand Prix and Monaco, he was given one more race at the European Grand Prix, before his seat was returned to Klien for the Canadian Grand Prix.

=== Toro Rosso (2006–2007) ===
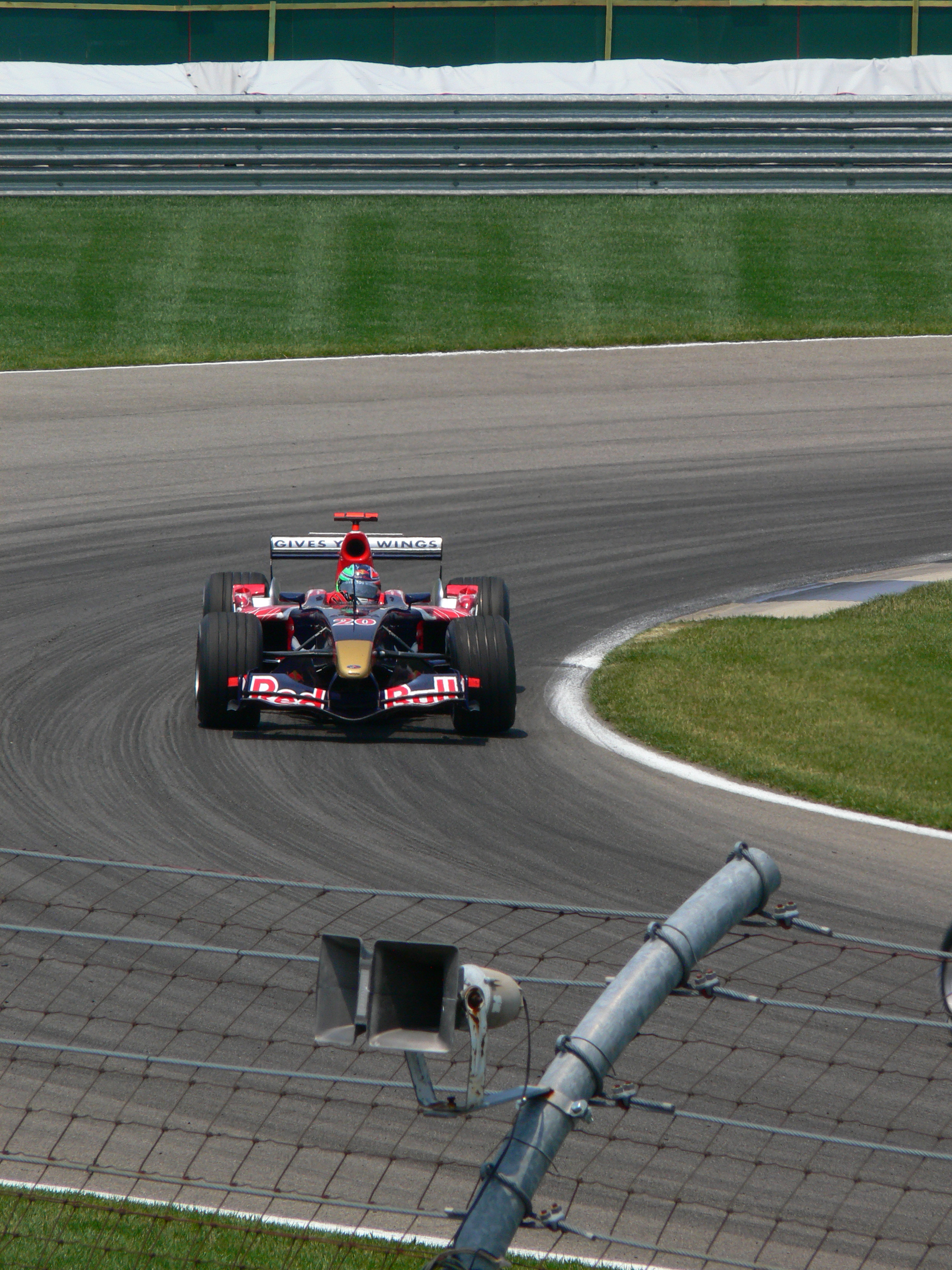
Liuzzi driving the Toro Rosso STR1 during the 2006 United States Grand Prix

Following Red Bull's purchase of the Minardi team – thereafter renamed Scuderia Toro Rosso, Italian for Team Red Bull – Liuzzi was rewarded with a full-season seat in the "B-team". At the 2006 United States Grand Prix, he scored the team's first point, with an eighth-place finish after a race-long battle with Coulthard and Nico Rosberg. However, that was the only point the team would score in 2006.

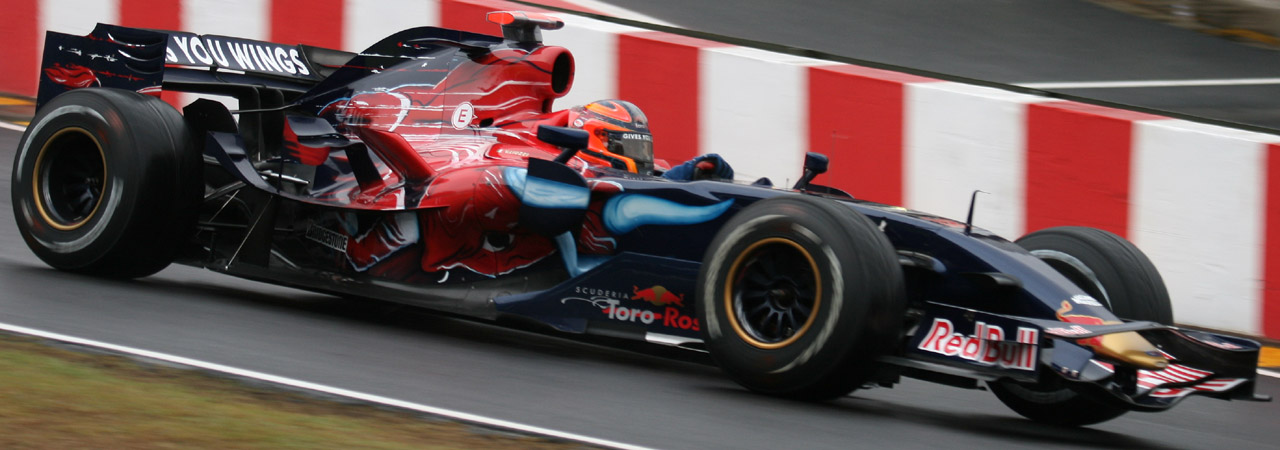
Liuzzi driving for STR at the 2007 Brazilian Grand Prix

Liuzzi was confirmed with the team for the 2007 season at the launch of the STR2 on 13 February 2007. Unfortunately, during the first half of his season his races were plagued by mistakes similar to his former teammate's. He seemed likely to score his first points of the season at Canada, but instead he crashed into the infamous "Wall of Champions" at the exit of the final chicane. He also faced constant speculation over keeping his seat, as the team openly courted both Sebastian Vettel and Champcar series champion Sébastien Bourdais. His teammate Scott Speed claimed Red Bull wanted to replace both himself and Liuzzi. Once Bourdais' contract for 2008 was announced, Liuzzi's performances improved. After being denied a world championship point in Japan by a post-race time penalty, he drove what many consider the best race of his Formula One career in China. Narrowly missing out on Q3 by qualifying 11th, he gained three places at the start, then overtook Mark Webber of the 'works' Red Bull team, as well as the BMW of Nick Heidfeld. Throughout the race, he kept pace with fifth-placed Jenson Button's Honda, and held off a late charge from Heidfeld to finish sixth and collect three points.

=== Force India (2008–2010) ===
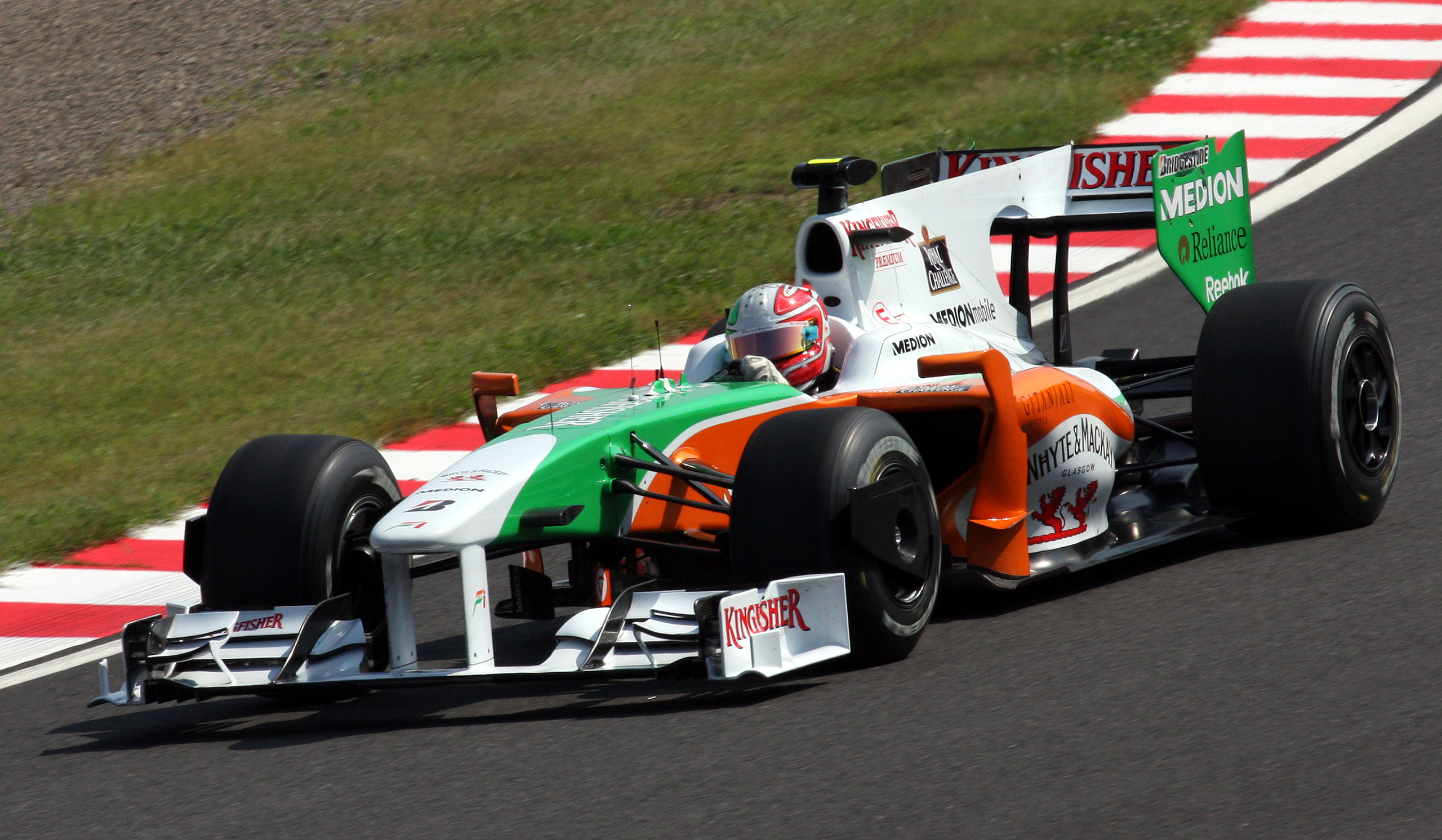
Liuzzi driving for Force India at the 2009 Japanese Grand Prix

On 10 August 2007 Toro Rosso confirmed that Sébastien Bourdais would drive for them in 2008, leaving Liuzzi without a seat. Liuzzi's manager, former Lotus boss Peter Collins, confirmed that Liuzzi wished to continue his involvement in F1. He had been linked to a test drive role with Williams, but it eventually went to Nico Hülkenberg. He then secured the role of test driver for the Force India F1 team on 10 January 2008. Liuzzi stated he hoped to move up to a race seat in 2010 as he is contracted until 2011, but the contracts of his teammates Adrian Sutil and Giancarlo Fisichella would not expire until the end of 2009.

On 3 September 2009, Force India released Fisichella so he could replace Luca Badoer at Ferrari, who had filled in for two races for injured driver Felipe Massa. On 7 September 2009, Force India announced that Liuzzi would drive for them in the remaining five races of the 2009 Formula One season. He made his race debut for Force India at the 2009 Italian Grand Prix and qualified an impressive seventh, given the fact he started the race with a heavier fuel load than his younger teammate Sutil. He was running solidly in the points, before retiring after 22 laps with a transmission problem.

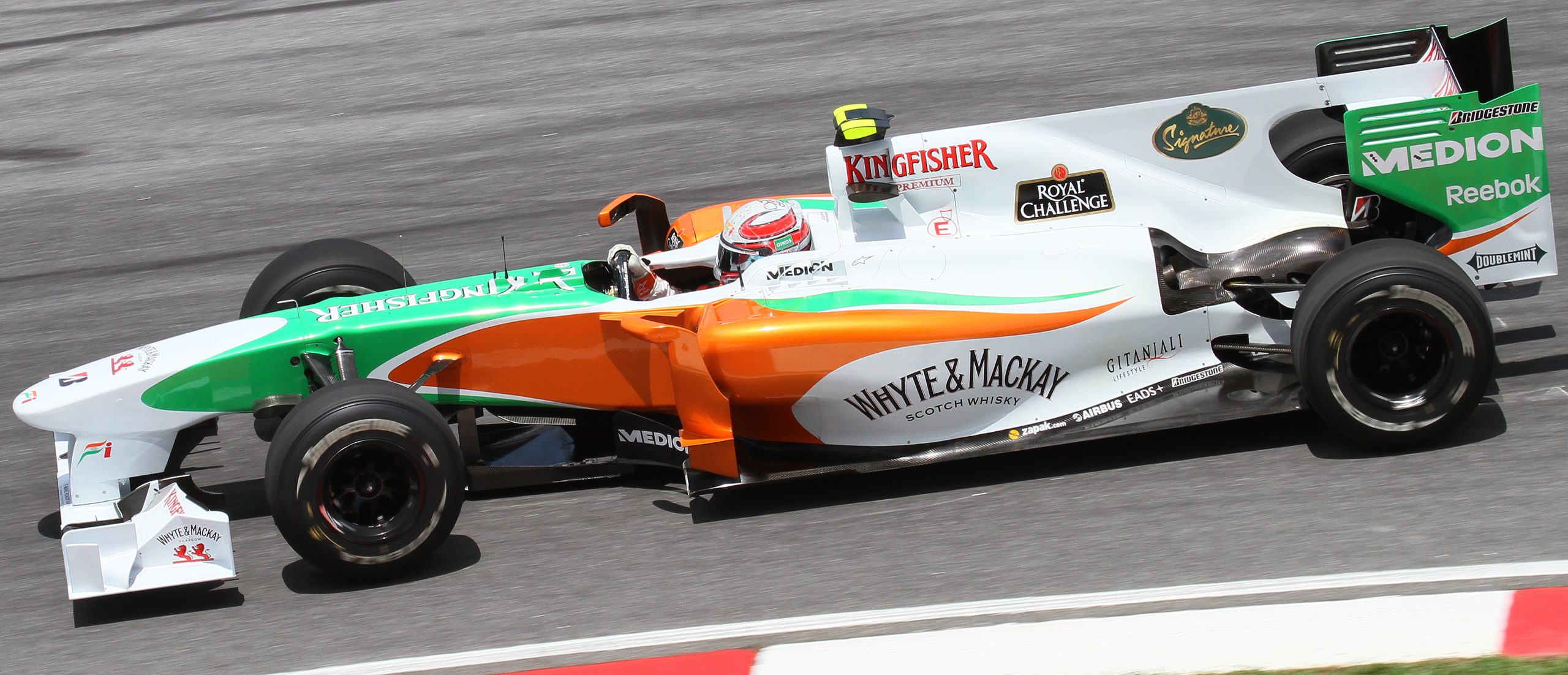
Liuzzi driving for Force India at the 2010 Malaysian Grand Prix

On 27 November 2009, Force India announced that it kept Adrian Sutil and Liuzzi as drivers for 2010.

Liuzzi achieved his first-points scoring finish since the 2007 Chinese Grand Prix in the season-opening 2010 Bahrain Grand Prix. He finished ninth in the race, picking up two points due to the introduction of a new points system in Formula One in 2010. At the following round in Australia, he finished seventh in changeable weather conditions collecting a further six points. In Monaco, Liuzzi finished ninth, scoring another two points for Force India. At the Canadian Grand Prix, Liuzzi qualified in a career-best sixth, which improved to fifth after Mark Webber's gearbox change. In the race, Liuzzi finished ninth after tangling with Felipe Massa at the first corner. He scored another point at Spa-Francorchamps, after Jaime Alguersuari was penalised post-race for gaining an advantage from cutting the Bus Stop chicane in the closing laps. He matched his career best finish of sixth at the Korean Grand Prix, and eventually finished 15th in the championship with 21 points, a career best.

Although he had a valid contract with Force India for 2011, Liuzzi was replaced by Paul di Resta.

=== HRT (2011–2012) ===
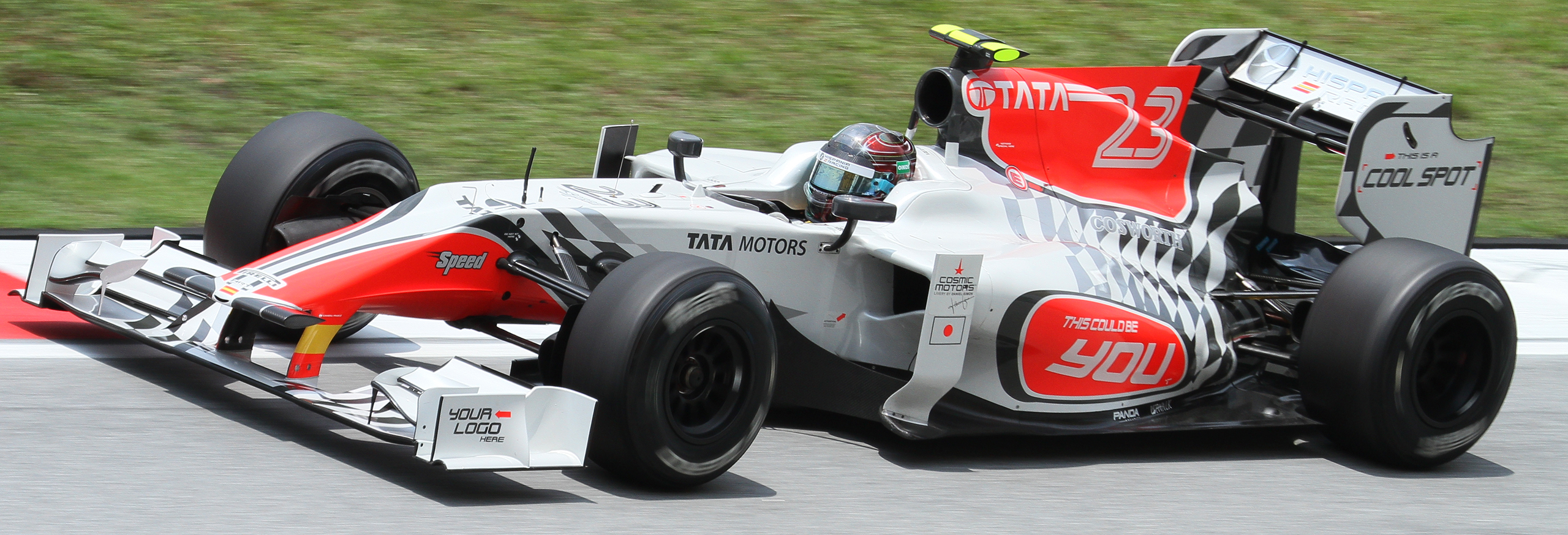
Liuzzi driving for Hispania at the Malaysian Grand Prix.

Liuzzi was considered as a possible replacement for Robert Kubica at Lotus Renault GP for the 2011 season, after Kubica sustained life-threatening injuries in a rally crash in Italy on 8 February. However, despite rumours suggesting that Kubica wanted Liuzzi to be his replacement, the team opted to employ Nick Heidfeld to fill the role instead.

Subsequently, Liuzzi was announced that he would be testing for Hispania Racing at Circuit de Catalunya, as the Spanish team evaluated him for their second race seat alongside Narain Karthikeyan. Liuzzi was confirmed in this role on 9 March 2011. He did not qualify for the Australian Grand Prix and retired in Malaysia after the team withdrew him for safety reasons. He recorded his first finishes with the team with a pair of 22nd-place finishes in China and Turkey but retired in Spain with a gearbox issue. He took a 16th-place finish in Monaco, and a 13th place in Canada, Hispania's best finish to date. After a 23rd-place finish at Valencia and an 18th at the British Grand Prix, he failed to finish in Germany with electrical problems. Liuzzi finished as the final classified finisher in Hungary (20th), and Belgium (19th), before a first-lap retirement in Italy after contact with Heikki Kovalainen. As a result of the contact, Liuzzi slid across the grass and directly into Vitaly Petrov and Nico Rosberg. He finished as the final classified finisher in Singapore (20th), Japan (23rd) and Korea (21st).

For the Indian Grand Prix, Liuzzi was replaced by Narain Karthikeyan, who took a race seat in front of his home fans alongside Daniel Ricciardo. Liuzzi returned to his race seat in Abu Dhabi however, and again finished as the final classified finisher, in twentieth place. In the final race at Brazil, he qualified 21st ahead of his teammate Ricciardo and both of the Virgin cars and was running ahead of Ricciardo in the race when he was forced to retire from the race due to an alternator failure on lap 61.

Liuzzi stated in January 2012 that, while he had a contract to continue with the team in 2012, his position within the team was uncertain. In February 2012, it was announced that Narain Karthikeyan had been handed the final race seat; leaving Liuzzi without a drive.

== Superstars Series (2012–2013) ==
Without a drive in Formula One, Liuzzi looked for other racing options. He eventually joined the International Superstars Series for the 2012 season, driving for CAAL Racing in a Mercedes C63 AMG. He took his first podium finish at the first race during the first round in Monza, and he took his first win of the season during the second race of that round.

== Super GT and Super Formula (2014) ==
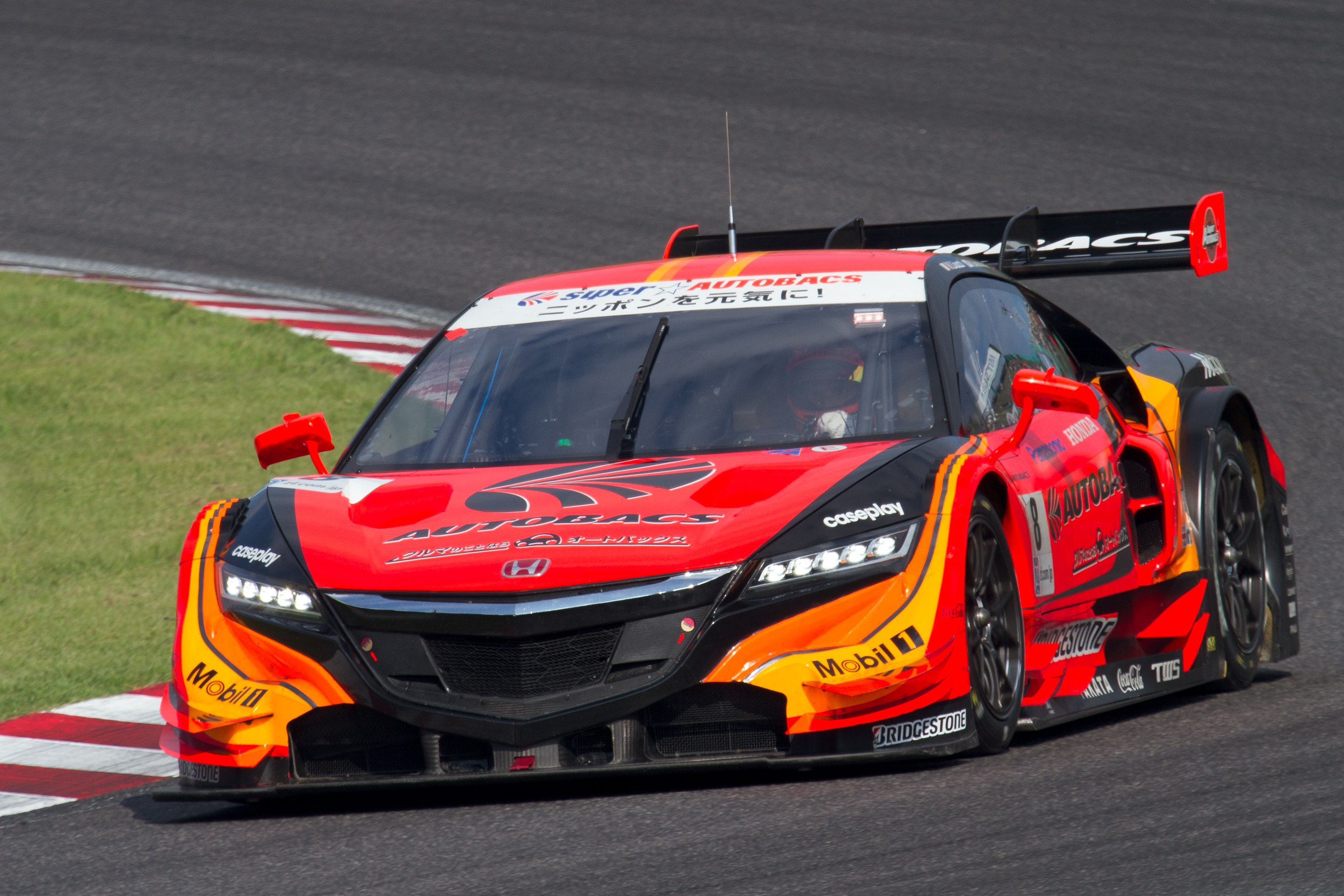
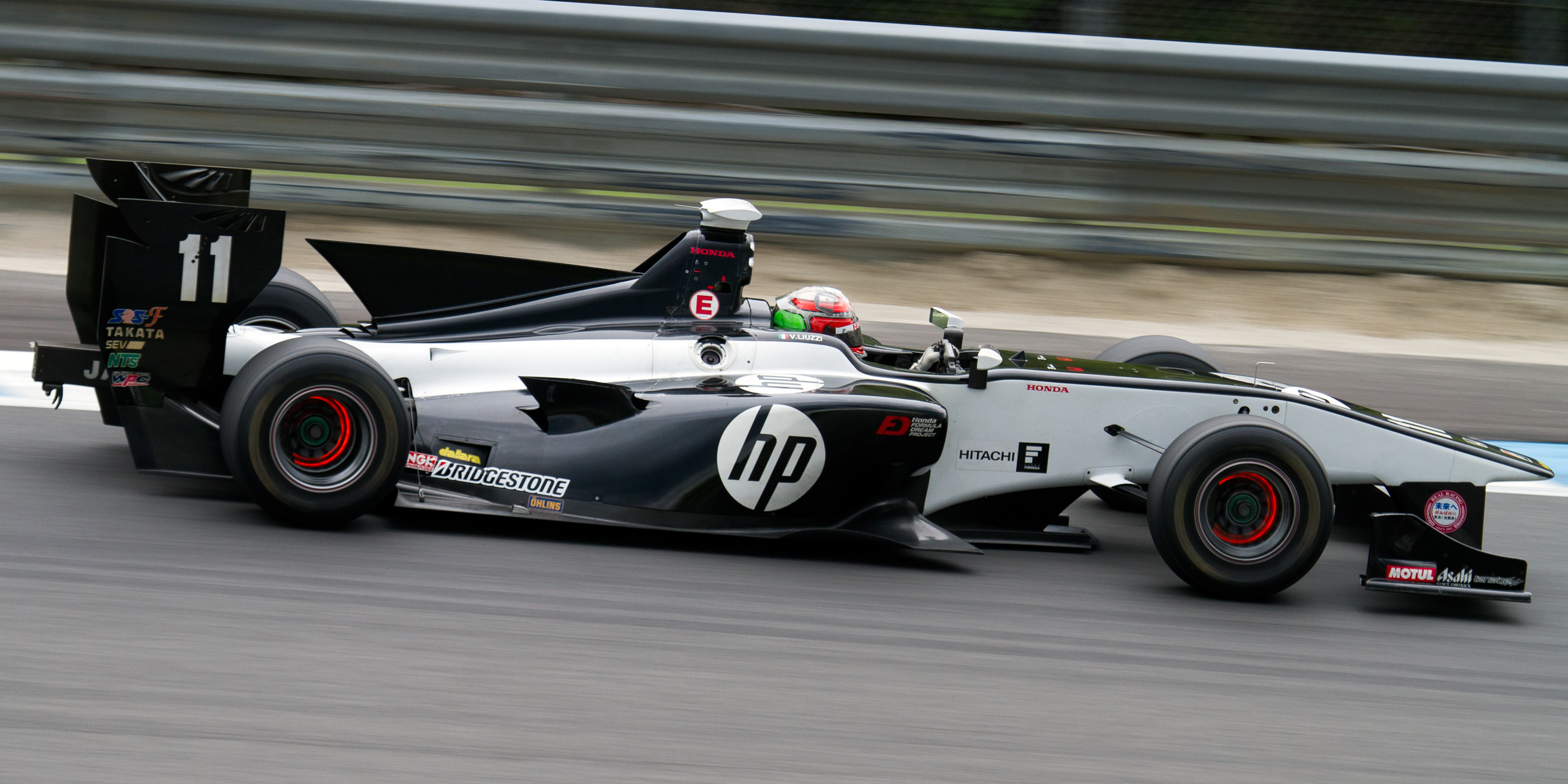
In 2014, Liuzzi moved to Japan, and competed in both top series of the country. He drove the Honda NSX Concept-GT in Super GT and the Dallara SF14 in Super Formula.

In 2014, Liuzzi moved to Japan and competed in Super GT (GT500 class) and Super Formula. In his first season of Super GT, he drove for the Autobacs Racing Team Aguri (ARTA) team along with Kosuke Matsuura.

== Personal life ==
In addition to his native Italian, Liuzzi speaks English and French. He was previously known for his piercings in his left upper ear, left eyebrow and left lower ear. He is married to Francesca Caldarelli which made Liuzzi a brother-in-law of Andrea Caldarelli.

In 2013, Liuzzi and Johnny Herbert mentored six contestants in a primetime ITV4 reality series, with the aim of taking players of the Gran Turismo videogames to the Dubai 24 Hour race as real drivers. Other countries in Europe had heats mentored by Sébastien Buemi.

== Racing record ==
=== Career summary ===
| Season | Series | Team | Races | Wins | Poles | F/laps | Podiums | Points | Position |
|---|---|---|---|---|---|---|---|---|---|
| 2001 | Formula Renault 2000 Germany | GM Motorsport | 8 | 1 | 1 | 3 | 4 | 139 | **2nd** |
| 2001 | Formula Renault 2000 Eurocup | GM Motorsport | 1 | 0 | 0 | 0 | 0 | 0 | NC |
| 2002 | German Formula Three | Opel Team BSR | 18 | 0 | 2 | 0 | 3 | 25 | 9th |
| 2002 | French Formula Three | Opel Team BSR | 2 | 0 | 0 | 0 | 0 | N/A | NC† |
| 2002 | Italian Formula Three | Opel Team BSR | 1 | 1 | 1 | ? | 1 | 9 | 8th |
| 2002 | Masters of Formula 3 | Opel Team BSR | 1 | 0 | 0 | 0 | 0 | N/A | 8th |
| 2002 | European Formula Three Cup | Opel Team BSR | 1 | 0 | 0 | 0 | 0 | N/A | NC |
| 2002 | Macau Grand Prix | Team Kolles Racing | 1 | 0 | 0 | 0 | 0 | N/A | NC |
| 2003 | International Formula 3000 | Red Bull Junior Team F3000 | 10 | 0 | 1 | 0 | 2 | 39 | 4th |
| 2003 | World Series by Nissan | RC Motorsport | 2 | 0 | 0 | 0 | 0 | 2 | 25th |
| 2004 | International Formula 3000 | Arden International | 10 | 7 | 9 | 3 | 9 | 86 | **1st** |
| 2005 | Formula One | Red Bull Racing | 4 | 0 | 0 | 0 | 0 | 1 | 24th |
| 2006 | Formula One | Scuderia Toro Rosso | 18 | 0 | 0 | 0 | 0 | 1 | 19th |
| 2007 | Formula One | Scuderia Toro Rosso | 17 | 0 | 0 | 0 | 0 | 3 | 18th |
| 2008–09 | Speedcar Series | UP Team | 9 | 3 | 1 | 4 | 5 | 45 | **3rd** |
| 2008–09 | A1 Grand Prix | A1 Team Italy | 4 | 0 | 1 | 0 | 0 | 7 | 16th |
| 2009 | Formula One | Force India F1 Team | 5 | 0 | 0 | 0 | 0 | 0 | 22nd |
| 2010 | Formula One | Force India F1 Team | 19 | 0 | 0 | 0 | 0 | 21 | 15th |
| 2011 | Formula One | Hispania Racing F1 Team | 18 | 0 | 0 | 0 | 0 | 0 | 23rd |
| 2011 | International V8 Supercars Championship | Tony D'Alberto Racing | 2 | 0 | 0 | 0 | 0 | 48 | 78th |
| 2012 | International Superstars Series | CAAL Racing | 16 | 2 | 1 | 0 | 9 | 181 | **2nd** |
| 2012 | Campionato Italiano Superstars | CAAL Racing | 10 | 1 | 0 | 0 | 3 | 92 | **3rd** |
| 2012 | World Endurance Championship | Lotus | 4 | 0 | 0 | 0 | 0 | 3 | 59th |
| 2012 | International V8 Supercars Championship | Tony D'Alberto Racing | 1 | 0 | 0 | 0 | 0 | 0 | NC† |
| 2013 | International Superstars Series | Mercedes-AMG Romeo Ferraris | 16 | 3 | 2 | 3 | 7 | 189 | **3rd** |
| 2013 | Campionato Italiano Superstars | Mercedes-AMG Romeo Ferraris | 10 | 2 | 1 | 2 | 6 | 158 | **2nd** |
| 2013 | FIA World Endurance Championship - LMP2 | Lotus | 6 | 0 | 0 | 0 | 0 | 8 | 25th |
| 2014 | Super GT | Autobacs Racing Team Aguri | 8 | 0 | 0 | 0 | 0 | 14 | 16th |
| 2014 | Super Formula | HP Real Racing | 9 | 0 | 0 | 0 | 0 | 1.5 | 16th |
| 2014–15 | Formula E | Trulli GP | 5 | 0 | 0 | 0 | 0 | 2 | 23rd |
| 2015 | GT Asia Series | FFF Racing Team by ACM | 8 | 1 | 0 | 0 | 1 | 38 | 24th |
| 2015 | FIA World Endurance Championship | Team ByKolles | 2 | 0 | 0 | 0 | 0 | 0 | NC |
| 2015 | Stock Car Brasil | Schin Racing Team | 1 | 0 | 0 | 0 | 0 | 0 | NC† |
| 2015–16 | Formula E | Trulli GP | 2 | 0 | 0 | 0 | 0 | 0 | NC |
| 2016–17 | Asian Le Mans Series - GT | FFF Racing by ACM | 1 | 0 | 0 | 0 | 0 | 6 | 17th |
| 2017 | International GT Open - Pro-Am | FFF Racing Team by ACM | 14 | 0 | 0 | 0 | 3 | 35 | 10th |
| 2017 | International GT Open | FFF Racing Team by ACM | 14 | 0 | 0 | 0 | 0 | 6 | 33rd |

^{†} As Liuzzi was a guest driver, he was ineligible to score points.

=== Complete Formula Renault 2000 Germany results ===
(key)

| Year | Entrant | 1 | 2 | 3 | 4 | 5 | 6 | 7 | 8 | DC | Points |
|---|---|---|---|---|---|---|---|---|---|---|---|
| 2001 | GM Motorsport | OSC1; 6 | LAU1; 3 | SAL; 3 | **NÜR1**; 1 | LAU2; 4 | HOC; 21 | NÜR2; 3 | OSC2; 4 | 3rd | 139 |

=== Complete German Formula Three Championship results ===
(key) (Races in bold indicate pole position; races in italics indicate fastest lap)

| Year | Entrant | Chassis | Engine | 1 | 2 | 3 | 4 | 5 | 6 | 7 | 8 | 9 | 10 | 11 | 12 | 13 | 14 | 15 | 16 | 17 | 18 | 19 | 20 | DC | Points |
|---|---|---|---|---|---|---|---|---|---|---|---|---|---|---|---|---|---|---|---|---|---|---|---|---|---|
| 2002 | Opel Team BSR | Dallara F302 | Opel | HOC1; 1; 14 | HOC1; 2 Ret | NÜR1; 1 C | NÜR1; 2 C | SAC; 1; 9 | SAC; 2; 8 | NOR; 1; 9 | NOR; 2; 4 | LAU; 1 Ret | LAU; 2; 7 | HOC2; 1; 23† | HOC2; 2; 25† | **NÜR2**; **1**; 2 | NÜR2; 2; 27 | A1R; 1 Ret | A1R; 2; 2 | ZAN; 1; 5 | ZAN; 2; 9 | **HOC3**; **1** Ret | HOC3; 2; 2 | 9th | 25 |

=== Complete International Formula 3000 results ===
(key) (Races in bold indicate pole position; races in italics indicate fastest lap)

| Year | Entrant | 1 | 2 | 3 | 4 | 5 | 6 | 7 | 8 | 9 | 10 | DC | Points |
|---|---|---|---|---|---|---|---|---|---|---|---|---|---|
| 2003 | Red Bull Junior Team F3000 | IMO; 4 | CAT; Ret | A1R; 4 | MON; Ret | NÜR; 2 | MAG; 4 | SIL; 3 | HOC; 4 | **HUN**; 9 | MNZ; 4 | 4th | 39 |
| 2004 | Arden International | **IMO**; 1 | CAT; 1 | **MON**; 1 | **NÜR**; 11 | **MAG**; 1 | **SIL**; 1 | **HOC**; 1 | **HUN**; 2 | **SPA**; 2 | **MNZ**; 1 | **1st** | **86** |

=== Complete Formula One results ===
(key) (Races in bold indicate pole position; races in italics indicate fastest lap)

| Year | Entrant | Chassis | Engine | 1 | 2 | 3 | 4 | 5 | 6 | 7 | 8 | 9 | 10 | 11 | 12 | 13 | 14 | 15 | 16 | 17 | 18 | 19 | WDC | Points |
|---|---|---|---|---|---|---|---|---|---|---|---|---|---|---|---|---|---|---|---|---|---|---|---|---|
| 2005 | Red Bull Racing | Red Bull RB1 | Cosworth TJ2005 3.0 V10 | AUS; TD | MAL; TD | BHR; TD | SMR; 8 | ESP; Ret | MON; Ret | EUR; 9 | CAN | USA | FRA; TD | GBR; TD | GER; TD | HUN; TD | TUR; TD | ITA; TD | BEL; TD | BRA; TD | JPN; TD | CHN; TD | 24th | 1 |
| 2006 | Scuderia Toro Rosso | Toro Rosso STR1 | Cosworth TJ2006 3.0 V10 14 Series | BHR; 11 | MAL; 11 | AUS; Ret | SMR; 14 | EUR; Ret | ESP; 15^{†} | MON; 10 | GBR; 13 | CAN; 13 | USA; 8 | FRA; 13 | GER; 10 | HUN; Ret | TUR; Ret | ITA; 14 | CHN; 10 | JPN; 14 | BRA; 13 | | 19th | 1 |
| 2007 | Scuderia Toro Rosso | Toro Rosso STR2 | Ferrari 056 2.4 V8 | AUS; 14 | MAL; 17 | BHR; Ret | ESP; Ret | MON; Ret | CAN; Ret | USA; 17^{†} | FRA; Ret | GBR; 16^{†} | EUR; Ret | HUN; Ret | TUR; 15 | ITA; 17 | BEL; 12 | JPN; 9 | CHN; 6 | BRA; 13 | | | 18th | 3 |
| 2009 | Force India F1 Team | Force India VJM02 | Mercedes FO 108W 2.4 V8 | AUS | MAL | CHN | BHR | ESP | MON | TUR | GBR | GER | HUN | EUR | BEL | ITA; Ret | SIN; 14 | JPN; 14 | BRA; 11 | ABU; 15 | | | 22nd | 0 |
| 2010 | Force India F1 Team | Force India VJM03 | Mercedes FO 108X 2.4 V8 | BHR; 9 | AUS; 7 | MAL; Ret | CHN; Ret | ESP; 15^{†} | MON; 9 | TUR; 13 | CAN; 9 | EUR; 16 | GBR; 11 | GER; 16 | HUN; 13 | BEL; 10 | ITA; 12 | SIN; Ret | JPN; Ret | KOR; 6 | BRA; Ret | ABU; Ret | 15th | 21 |
| 2011 | Hispania Racing F1 Team | Hispania F111 | Cosworth CA2011 2.4 V8 | AUS; DNQ | MAL; Ret | CHN; 22 | TUR; 22 | ESP; Ret | MON; 16 | CAN; 13 | EUR; 23 | GBR; 18 | | | | | | | | | | | 23rd | 0 |
| 2011 | HRT Formula 1 Team | Hispania F111 | Cosworth CA2011 2.4 V8 | | | | | | | | | | GER; Ret | HUN; 20 | BEL; 19 | ITA; Ret | SIN; 20 | JPN; 23 | KOR; 21 | IND | ABU; 20 | BRA; Ret | 23rd | 0 |

^{†} Driver did not finish the Grand Prix, but was classified as he completed over 90% of the race distance.

=== Complete A1 Grand Prix results ===
(key) (Races in bold indicate pole position; races in italics indicate fastest lap)

| Year | Entrant | 1 | 2 | 3 | 4 | 5 | 6 | 7 | 8 | 9 | 10 | 11 | 12 | 13 | 14 | DC | Points | Ref |
|---|---|---|---|---|---|---|---|---|---|---|---|---|---|---|---|---|---|---|
| 2008–09 | Italy | NED; SPR | NED; FEA | CHN; SPR | CHN; FEA | MYS; SPR | MYS; FEA | NZL; SPR | NZL; FEA | RSA; SPR | RSA; FEA | **POR**; **SPR**; 4 | POR; FEA; Ret | GBR; SPR; 10 | GBR; SPR; 9 | 16th | 17 | |

=== Complete Speedcar Series results ===
(key) (Races in bold indicate pole position; races in italics indicate fastest lap)

| Year | Team | 1 | 2 | 3 | 4 | 5 | 6 | 7 | 8 | 9 | 10 | Pos | Points |
|---|---|---|---|---|---|---|---|---|---|---|---|---|---|
| 2008–09 | Union Properties | DUB; 1; 1 | DUB; 2 C | BHR; 1 Ret | BHR; 2; 8 | LOS; 1; 2 | LOS; 2; 1 | DUB; 1; 12 | DUB; 2 Ret | BHR; 1; 3 | BHR; 2; 1 | **3rd** | **45** |

=== Complete V8 Supercar results ===
(key) (Races in bold indicate pole position; races in italics indicate fastest lap)

| Year | Team | Car | 1 | 2 | 3 | 4 | 5 | 6 | 7 | 8 | 9 | 10 | 11 | 12 | 13 | 14 | 15 | 16 | 17 | 18 | 19 | 20 | 21 | 22 | 23 | 24 | 25 | 26 | 27 | 28 | 29 | 30 | 31 | Pos | Points | Ref |
|---|---|---|---|---|---|---|---|---|---|---|---|---|---|---|---|---|---|---|---|---|---|---|---|---|---|---|---|---|---|---|---|---|---|---|---|---|
| 2011 | Tony D'Alberto Racing | Ford FG Falcon | YMC; R1 | YMC; R2 | ADE; R3 | ADE; R4 | HAM; R5 | HAM; R6 | BAR; R7 | BAR; R8 | BAR; R9 | WIN; R10 | WIN; R11 | HID; R12 | HID; R13 | TOW; R14 | TOW; R15 | QLD; R16 | QLD; R17 | QLD; R18 | PHI; Q | PHI; R19 | BAT; R20 | SUR; R21; Ret | SUR; R22; 19 | SYM; R23 | SYM; R24 | SAN; R25 | SAN; R26 | SYD; R27 | SYD; R28 | | | 78th | 48 | |
| 2012 | Tony D'Alberto Racing | Ford FG Falcon | ADE; R1 | ADE; R2 | SYM; R3 | SYM; R4 | HAM; R5 | HAM; R6 | BAR; R7 | BAR; R8 | BAR; R9 | PHI; R10 | PHI; R11 | HID; R12 | HID; R13 | TOW; R14 | TOW; R15 | QLD; R16 | QLD; R17 | SMP; R18 | SMP; R19 | SAN; Q | SAN; R20 | BAT; R21 | SUR; R22; Ret | SUR; R23; DNS | YMC; R24 | YMC; R25 | YMC; R26 | WIN; R27 | WIN; R28 | SYD; R29 | SYD; R30 | NC | 0+ | |

+ Not Eligible for points

=== Complete International Superstars Series results ===
(key) (Races in bold indicate pole position; races in italics indicate fastest lap)

| Year | Team | Car | 1 | 2 | 3 | 4 | 5 | 6 | 7 | 8 | 9 | 10 | 11 | 12 | 13 | 14 | 15 | 16 | DC | Points | Ref |
|---|---|---|---|---|---|---|---|---|---|---|---|---|---|---|---|---|---|---|---|---|---|
| 2012 | CAAL Racing | Mercedes C63 AMG | MNZ; 1; 3 | MNZ; 2; 1 | IMO; 1; 6 | IMO; 2 Ret | DON; 1; 5 | DON; 2; 3 | MUG; 1; 5 | MUG; 2; 5 | **HUN**; **1**; 1 | HUN; 2; 2 | SPA; 1; 3 | SPA; 2; 2 | VAL; 1; 4 | VAL; 2; 7 | PER; 1; 3 | PER; 2; 9 | 2nd | 181 | |
| 2013 | Mercedes-AMG Romeo Ferraris | Mercedes C63 AMG | **MNZ**; **1**; 1 | MNZ; 2; 2 | BRN; 1; 4 | BRN; 2 Ret | **SVK**; **1**; 1 | SVK; 2 Ret | ZOL; 1; 5 | ZOL; 2; 7 | ALG; 1; 2 | ALG; 2; 2 | DON; 1 DSQ | DON; 2 DSQ | IMO; 1; 1 | IMO; 2; 2 | VAL; 1; 5 | VAL; 2; 4 | 3rd | 181 | |

=== Complete FIA World Endurance Championship results ===
(key) (Races in bold indicate pole position)

| Year | Entrant | Class | Chassis | Engine | 1 | 2 | 3 | 4 | 5 | 6 | 7 | 8 | Rank | Points |
|---|---|---|---|---|---|---|---|---|---|---|---|---|---|---|
| 2012 | Lotus | LMP2 | Lola B12/80 | Lotus 3.6 L V8 | SEB | SPA | LMS | SIL; Ret | SÃO; 13 | BHR; 9 | FUJ; 12 | SHA | 59th | 3 |
| 2013 | Lotus | LMP2 | Lotus T128 | Praga Judd 3.6 L V8 | SIL; Ret | SPA; 6 | LMS | SÃO | COA; DNS | FUJ; 10 | SHA; Ret | BHR; Ret | 25th | 8 |
| 2015 | Team ByKolles | LMP1 | CLM P1/01 | AER P60 Turbo V6 | SIL; Ret | SPA; Ret | LMS | NÜR | COA | FUJ | SHA | BHR | NC | 0 |

=== Complete Super GT results ===
(key) (Races in bold indicate pole position; races in italics indicate fastest lap)

| Year | Team | Car | Class | 1 | 2 | 3 | 4 | 5 | 6 | 7 | 8 | DC | Points |
|---|---|---|---|---|---|---|---|---|---|---|---|---|---|
| 2014 | Autobacs Racing Team Aguri | Honda NSX-GT | GT500 | OKA; 8 | FUJ; Ret | AUT; Ret | SUG; 15 | FUJ; 10 | SUZ; 4 | BUR; Ret | MOT; 12 | 16th | 14 |

=== Complete Super Formula results ===
(key) (Races in bold indicate pole position; races in italics indicate fastest lap)

| Year | Team | Engine | 1 | 2 | 3 | 4 | 5 | 6 | 7 | 8 | 9 | DC | Points |
|---|---|---|---|---|---|---|---|---|---|---|---|---|---|
| 2014 | HP Real Racing | Honda | SUZ; 8 | FUJ; 8 | FUJ; 10 | FUJ; Ret | MOT; 14 | AUT; Ret | SUG; Ret | SUZ; 15 | SUZ; 11 | 16th | 1.5 |

=== Complete Formula E results ===
(key) (Races in bold indicate pole position; races in italics indicate fastest lap)

| Year | Team | Chassis | Powertrain | 1 | 2 | 3 | 4 | 5 | 6 | 7 | 8 | 9 | 10 | 11 | Pos | Points |
|---|---|---|---|---|---|---|---|---|---|---|---|---|---|---|---|---|
| 2014–15 | Trulli Formula E Team | Spark SRT01-e | SRT01-e | BEI | PUT | PDE | BUE | MIA; 16 | LBH; 13 | MCO; NC | BER; 9 | MSC; 17 | LDN | LDN | 23rd | 2 |
| 2015–16 | Trulli Formula E Team | Spark SRT01-e | Motomatica JT-01 | BEI; DNP | PUT; DNP | PDE | BUE | MEX | LBH | PAR | BER | LDN | LDN | | NC | 0 |

=== Complete Stock Car Brasil results ===
| Year | Team | Car | 1 | 2 | 3 | 4 | 5 | 6 | 7 | 8 | 9 | 10 | 11 | 12 | 13 | 14 | 15 | 16 | 17 | 18 | 19 | 20 | 21 | Rank | Points | Ref |
|---|---|---|---|---|---|---|---|---|---|---|---|---|---|---|---|---|---|---|---|---|---|---|---|---|---|---|
| 2015 | Schin Racing Team | Peugeot 408 | GOI; 1; 25 | RBP; 1 | RBP; 2 | VEL; 1 | VEL; 2 | CUR; 1 | CUR; 2 | SCZ; 1 | SCZ; 2 | CUR; 1 | CUR; 2 | GOI; 1 | CAS; 1 | CAS; 2 | BRA; 1 | BRA; 2 | CUR; 1 | CUR; 2 | TAR; 1 | TAR; 2 | INT; 1 | NC† | 0† | |

^{†} Ineligible for championship points.

== Notes ==
Sporting positions
| Preceded by Björn Wirdheim | International Formula 3000; Champion; 2004 | Succeeded by Nico Rosberg (GP2) |
| Preceded by Jules Bianchi | Desafio Internacional das Estrelas; Winner; 2014 | Succeeded by None |
