= 2008–09 Speedcar Series =

The 2008–09 Speedcar Series was the second and final season Speedcar Series championship. The championship consisted of five meetings, starting on December 5, 2008 at the Dubai Autodrome in the United Arab Emirates and finishing at the Bahrain International Circuit on April 25, 2009. Gianni Morbidelli finished as champion, pipping defending champion Johnny Herbert by just two points.

== Teams and drivers ==
All of the teams used the Speedcar V8 vehicle with tyres supplied by Michelin.

Team	No.	Driver name	Rounds
(United States) Palm Beach (United States) Palm Racing	04	(Italy) Thomas Biagi	2–5
(United States) Palm Beach (United States) Palm Racing	07	(Sweden) Stefan Johansson	1
(United States) Palm Beach (United States) Palm Racing	10	(Italy) Gianni Morbidelli	All
(United Arab Emirates) Continental Circus	09	(Germany) Marcel Tiemann	1
(United Arab Emirates) Continental Circus	09	(Italy) Enzo Panacci	2
(United Arab Emirates) Continental Circus	26	(Austria) Christopher Zöchling	4–5
(United Arab Emirates) Continental Circus	32	(France) Eric Charles	1–2, 4
(United Arab Emirates) Continental Circus	80	(Germany) Heinz-Harald Frentzen	5
(Italy) Scuderia Giudici	09	(Italy) Gianni Giudici	5
(Italy) Scuderia Giudici	96	(United Arab Emirates) Ramez Azzam	5
(Monaco) JMB Racing	13	(France) Damien Pasini	All
(Monaco) JMB Racing	69	(United Kingdom) Johnny Herbert	All
(United Arab Emirates) Union Properties	20	(Italy) Vitantonio Liuzzi	All
(United Arab Emirates) Union Properties	85	(United Arab Emirates) Hasher Al Maktoum	All
(United Arab Emirates) Union Properties	85	(United Arab Emirates) Ramez Azzam	4
(Germany) Phoenix Racing	21	(Austria) Mathias Lauda	1
(Germany) Phoenix Racing	80	(Germany) Heinz-Harald Frentzen	1
(Italy) Team Lavaggi	21	(United Kingdom) Chris Buncombe	2
(Italy) Team Lavaggi	33	(Italy) Marco Melandri	3–4
(Italy) Team Lavaggi	80	(Germany) Heinz-Harald Frentzen	2–4
(United Kingdom) West-Tec	21	(United Kingdom) Chris Buncombe	5
(United Kingdom) West-Tec	44	(France) David Terrien	5
(Italy) Durango	25	(Austria) Christopher Zöchling	1–3
(Italy) Durango	25	(Bahrain) Hamad Al Fardan	4
(Italy) Durango	32	(Italy) Marco Cioci	5
(Italy) Durango	44	(France) David Terrien	4
(Italy) Durango	71	(France) Nicolas Navarro	5
(Italy) Durango	96	(Canada) Jacques Villeneuve	1–3
(United Kingdom) HPR	27	(France) Jean Alesi	All
(United Kingdom) HPR	50	(Hong Kong) Marchy Lee	All
(Qatar) QMMF Team	59	(Qatar) Fahad Al Thani	3
(Qatar) QMMF Team	95	(Qatar) Ahamad Al Kuwari	3
(Italy) Team Siram	90	(Italy) Giovanni Lavaggi	2
(Italy) Team Barwa	90	(Qatar) Nasser Al-Attiyah	3

== Calendar ==
Round		Circuit	Date	Pole position	Fastest lap	Winning driver	Winning team	Report
1	R1	(United Arab Emirates) Dubai Autodrome (Grand Prix Circuit)	December 5	(Italy) Vitantonio Liuzzi	(Germany) Heinz-Harald Frentzen	(Italy) Vitantonio Liuzzi	(United Arab Emirates) Union Properties	Report
1	R2	(United Arab Emirates) Dubai Autodrome (Grand Prix Circuit)	December 6	The race was canceled due to heavy rain				Report
2	R1	Bahrain International Circuit	January 23	(Germany) Heinz-Harald Frentzen	(Germany) Heinz-Harald Frentzen	(France) Jean Alesi	(United Kingdom) HPR	Report
2	R2	Bahrain International Circuit	January 24		(Germany) Heinz-Harald Frentzen	(United Kingdom) Johnny Herbert	(Monaco) JMB Racing	Report
3	R1	(Qatar) Losail International Circuit	February 13	(Italy) Vitantonio Liuzzi	(Italy) Vitantonio Liuzzi	(Italy) Gianni Morbidelli	(United States) Palm Beach	Report
3	R2	(Qatar) Losail International Circuit	February 14		(Italy) Vitantonio Liuzzi	(Italy) Vitantonio Liuzzi	(United Arab Emirates) Union Properties	Report
4	R1	(United Arab Emirates) Dubai Autodrome (International Circuit)	February 27	(Austria) Christopher Zöchling	(Austria) Christopher Zöchling	(France) Jean Alesi	(United Kingdom) HPR	Report
4	R2	(United Arab Emirates) Dubai Autodrome (International Circuit)	February 28		(France) Jean Alesi	(France) Jean Alesi	(United Kingdom) HPR	Report
5	R1	Bahrain International Circuit	April 25	(United Kingdom) Johnny Herbert	(Italy) Vitantonio Liuzzi	(United Kingdom) Johnny Herbert	(Monaco) JMB Racing	Report
5	R2	Bahrain International Circuit	April 26		(Italy) Vitantonio Liuzzi	(Italy) Vitantonio Liuzzi	(United Arab Emirates) Union Properties	Report

== Championship Standings ==
=== Drivers ===
Points were awarded to the top eight classified finishers using the following structure:

Position	1st	2nd	3rd	4th	5th	6th	7th	8th
Points	10	8	6	5	4	3	2	1

Pos	Driver	DUB (United Arab Emirates)		BHR (Bahrain)		LOS (Qatar)		DUB (United Arab Emirates)		BHR (Bahrain)		Points
1	(Italy) Gianni Morbidelli	3	C	4	2	1	2	7	2	5	5	55
2	(United Kingdom) Johnny Herbert	4	C	3	1	3	6	5	3	1	6	53
3	(Italy) Vitantonio Liuzzi	1	C	Ret	8	2	1	12	Ret	3	1	45
4	(Germany) Heinz-Harald Frentzen	2	C	2	4	Ret	5	3	4	2	12	44
5	(France) Jean Alesi	10	C	1	6	4	Ret	1	1	Ret	10	38
6	(Italy) Thomas Biagi			6	3	7	3	9	6	8	2	29
7	(United Arab Emirates) Hasher Al Maktoum	5	C	5	7	6	Ret	6	DNP	6	3	25
8	(Austria) Christopher Zöchling	11	C	DNS	Ret	9	4	2	10	4	8	19
9	(France) Damien Pasini	8	C	7	5	Ret	8	8	9	7	Ret	11
10	(France) David Terrien							4	5	Ret	Ret	9
11	(Canada) Jacques Villeneuve	6	C	10	Ret	5	Ret					7
12	(Hong Kong) Marchy Lee	7	C	Ret	Ret	Ret	7	11	7	12	9	6
13	(France) Nicolas Navarro									9	4	5
14	(United Kingdom) Chris Buncombe			9	9					Ret	7	2
15	(Italy) Marco Melandri					8	11†	10	8			2
16	(Italy) Giovanni Lavaggi			8	10							1
17	(Qatar) Nasser Al-Attiyah					10	9					0
18	(France) Eric Charles	9	C	11	11			14	12			0
19	(United Arab Emirates) Ramez Azzam								11	10	Ret	0
20	(Qatar) Fahad Al Thani					12	10					0
21	(Italy) Marco Cioci									11	11	0
22	(Qatar) Ahamad Al Kuwari					11	Ret					0
23	(Bahrain) Hamad Al Fardan							13	Ret			0
	(Sweden) Stefan Johansson	Ret	C									0
	(Germany) Marcel Tiemann	Ret	C									0
	(Austria) Mathias Lauda	Ret	C									0
	(Italy) Enzo Panacci			DNS	Ret							0
	(Italy) Gianni Giudici									Ret	Ret	0
Pos	Driver	DUB (United Arab Emirates)		BHR (Bahrain)		LOS (Qatar)		DUB (United Arab Emirates)		BHR (Bahrain)		Points

Colour	Result
Gold	Winner
Silver	Second place
Bronze	Third place
Green	Points classification
Blue	Non-points classification
Blue	Non-classified finish (NC)
Purple	Retired, not classified (Ret)
Red	Did not qualify (DNQ)
Red	Did not pre-qualify (DNPQ)
Black	Disqualified (DSQ)
White	Did not start (DNS)
White	Withdrew (WD)
White	Race cancelled (C)
Blank	Did not practice (DNP)
Blank	Did not arrive (DNA)
Blank	Excluded (EX)

Notes:

- † – Driver did not finish the race, but was classified as he completed more than 90% of the race distance.

=== Teams ===
Pos	Driver	DUB (United Arab Emirates)		BHR (Bahrain)		LOS (Qatar)		DUB (United Arab Emirates)		BHR (Bahrain)		Points
1	(United Arab Emirates) Union Properties	1	C	Ret	8	2	1	12	Ret	3	1	70
1	(United Arab Emirates) Union Properties	5	C	5	7	6	Ret	6	11	6	3	70
2	(Monaco) JMB Racing	8	C	7	5	Ret	8	8	9	7	Ret	64
2	(Monaco) JMB Racing	4	C	3	1	3	6	5	3	1	6	64
3	(United Kingdom) HPR	10	C	1	6	4	Ret	1	1	Ret	10	44
3	(United Kingdom) HPR	7	C	Ret	Ret	Ret	7	11	7	12	9	44
4	(United States) Palm Racing							9	6	8	2	30
4	(United States) Palm Racing							7	2	5	5	30
5	(Italy) Team Lavaggi			9	9							30
5	(Italy) Team Lavaggi					8	11†	10	8			30
5	(Italy) Team Lavaggi			2	4	Ret	5	3	4			30
6	(Italy) Durango	11	C	DNS	Ret	9	4	13	Ret			26
6	(Italy) Durango									11	11	26
6	(Italy) Durango							4	5			26
6	(Italy) Durango									9	4	26
6	(Italy) Durango	6	C	10	Ret	5	Ret					26
7	(United Arab Emirates) Continental Circus	Ret	C	DNS	Ret							22
7	(United Arab Emirates) Continental Circus							2	10	4	8	22
7	(United Arab Emirates) Continental Circus	9	C	11	11			14	12			22
7	(United Arab Emirates) Continental Circus									2	12	22
8	(Germany) Phoenix Racing	Ret	C									8
8	(Germany) Phoenix Racing	2	C									8
9	(United Kingdom) West-Tec									Ret	7	2
9	(United Kingdom) West-Tec									Ret	Ret	2
10	(Italy) Team Siram			8	10							1
11	(Italy) Team Barwa					10	9					0
12	(Qatar) QMMF Team					12	10					0
12	(Qatar) QMMF Team					11	Ret					0
13	(Italy) Scuderia Giudici									Ret	Ret	0
13	(Italy) Scuderia Giudici									10	Ret	0
EX	(United States) Palm Beach			6	3	7	3					0 (54)
EX	(United States) Palm Beach	Ret	C									0 (54)
EX	(United States) Palm Beach	3	C	4	2	1	2					0 (54)
Pos	Driver	DUB (United Arab Emirates)		BHR (Bahrain)		LOS (Qatar)		DUB (United Arab Emirates)		BHR (Bahrain)		Points

Colour	Result
Gold	Winner
Silver	Second place
Bronze	Third place
Green	Points classification
Blue	Non-points classification
Blue	Non-classified finish (NC)
Purple	Retired, not classified (Ret)
Red	Did not qualify (DNQ)
Red	Did not pre-qualify (DNPQ)
Black	Disqualified (DSQ)
White	Did not start (DNS)
White	Withdrew (WD)
White	Race cancelled (C)
Blank	Did not practice (DNP)
Blank	Did not arrive (DNA)
Blank	Excluded (EX)

Invalid results in italics.

Notes:

- † – Driver did not finish the race, but was classified as he completed more than 90% of the race distance.
