= 2009 Qatar GP2 Asia Series round =

2009 Motor Race in Qatar

2009 Qatar GP2 round
Round details
- Round 4 of 6 rounds in the 2009 GP2 Series
- Losail International Circuit
- Location: Losail International Circuit, Lusail, Qatar
- Course: Permanent racing facility 5.380 km (3.343 mi)

GP2 Series

Feature race
- Date: 13 February 2009
- Laps: 34 (182.920 km)

Pole position
Driver	(Germany) Nico Hülkenberg	ART Grand Prix
- Time: 1:35.741

Podium
First	(Germany) Nico Hülkenberg	ART Grand Prix
Second	(Mexico) Sergio Pérez	Barwa Int. Campos Team
Third	(Russia) Vitaly Petrov	Barwa Int. Campos Team

Fastest lap
Driver	(Portugal) Álvaro Parente (Note: Álvaro Parente set the fastest lap, but did not finish in the top 10, so was ineligible to be the point-scorer for the fastest lap. Nico Hülkenberg was the point-scorer instead for setting the fastest lap of those finishing in the top 10.)	My Team Qi-Meritus Mahara
- Time: 1:38.699 (on lap 21)

Sprint race
- Date: 14 February 2009
- Laps: 23 (123.740 km)

Podium
First	(Mexico) Sergio Pérez	Barwa Int. Campos Team
Second	(Russia) Vitaly Petrov	Barwa Int. Campos Team
Third	(Germany) Nico Hülkenberg	ART Grand Prix

Fastest lap
Driver	(Mexico) Sergio Pérez	Barwa Int. Campos Team
- Time: 1:39.527 (on lap 22)

The 2009 Qatar GP2 Asia Series round was a GP2 Asia Series motor race held on 13 and 14 February 2009 at Losail International Circuit in Lusail, Qatar. It was the fourth round of the 2008–09 GP2 Asia Series.

When Nico Hülkenberg, Sergio Pérez and Vitaly Petrov taking the podium, it was the only time in the history of the GP2 Asian Series that the same top three were seen on the podium in both the feature race as the sprint race.

== Classification ==
=== Qualifying ===
Pos.	No.	Driver	Team	Time	Gap	Grid
1	2	(Germany) Nico Hülkenberg	ART Grand Prix	1.35.741		1
2	6	(Mexico) Sergio Pérez	Barwa International Campos Team	1.36.464	+0.723	2
3	5	(Russia) Vitaly Petrov	Barwa International Campos Team	1.36.487	+0.746	3
4	8	(Japan) Kamui Kobayashi	DAMS	1.36.525	+0.784	6
5	20	(Spain) Roldán Rodríguez	Piquet GP	1.36.583	+0.842	5
6	1	(Japan) Sakon Yamamoto	ART Grand Prix	1.36.667	+0.926	6
7	11	(Spain) Javier Villa	Super Nova Racing	1.36.685	+0.944	7
8	16	(Italy) Davide Valsecchi	Durango	1.36.923	+1.182	8
9	4	(Italy) Edoardo Mortara	Arden International Motorsport	1.36.987	+1.246	9
10	7	(Belgium) Jérôme d'Ambrosio	DAMS	1.37.027	+1.286	10
11	12	(United Kingdom) James Jakes	Super Nova Racing	1.37.274	+1.533	11
12	18	(Italy) Marco Bonanomi	My Team Qi-Meritus Mahara	1.37.328	+1.587	12
13	19	(Portugal) Álvaro Parente	My Team Qi-Meritus Mahara	1.37.409	+1.668	13
14	21	(Brazil) Diego Nunes	Piquet GP	1.37.605	+1.864	14
15	25	(Italy) Fabrizio Crestani	Ocean Racing Technology	1.37.752	+2.011	15
16	9	(Netherlands) Giedo van der Garde	GFH Team iSport	1.37.789	+2.048	16
17	22	(Romania) Michael Herck	DPR	1.37.928	+2.187	17
18	23	(Italy) Giacomo Ricci	DPR	1.38.069	+2.328	18
19	3	(Brazil) Luiz Razia	Arden International Motorsport	1.38.264	+2.523	19
20	27	(Italy) Davide Rigon	Trident Racing	1.38.320	+2.579	20
21	10	(Bahrain) Hamad Al Fardan	GFH Team iSport	1.38.383	+2.642	21
22	14	(Venezuela) Rodolfo González	Fisichella Motor Sport International	1.38.384	+2.643	22
23	24	(Netherlands) Yelmer Buurman	Ocean Racing Technology	1.38.453	+2.712	23
24	26	(Italy) Frankie Provenzano	Trident Racing	1.39.314	+3.573	24
25	17	(Italy) Michael Dalle Stelle	Durango	1.41.623	+5.882	25
26	15	(United States) Kevin Chen	Fisichella Motor Sport International	1.43.139	+7.398	26

=== Feature race ===
Pos.	No.	Driver	Team	Laps	Time/Retired	Grid	Points
1	2	(Germany) Nico Hülkenberg	ART Grand Prix	34	1:10.38.323	1	10+2+1
2	6	(Mexico) Sergio Pérez	Barwa International Campos Team	34	+13.295	2	8
3	5	(Russia) Vitaly Petrov	Barwa International Campos Team	34	+14.343	3	6
4	8	(Japan) Kamui Kobayashi	DAMS	34	+14.746	4	5
5	7	(Belgium) Jérôme d'Ambrosio	DAMS	34	+23.419	10	4
6	16	(Italy) Davide Valsecchi	Durango	34	+33.919	8	3
7	4	(Italy) Edoardo Mortara	Arden International Motorsport	34	+35.214	9	2
8	3	(Brazil) Luiz Razia	Arden International Motorsport	34	+35.341	19	1
9	12	(United Kingdom) James Jakes	Super Nova Racing	34	+41.162	11	
10	25	(Italy) Fabrizio Crestani	Ocean Racing Technology	34	+43.774	15	
11	21	(Brazil) Diego Nunes	Piquet GP	34	+45.097	14	
12	9	(Netherlands) Giedo van der Garde	GFH Team iSport	34	+47.627	16	
13	11	(Spain) Javier Villa	Super Nova Racing	34	+47.827	7	
14	27	(Italy) Davide Rigon	Trident Racing	34	+1.07.444	20	
15	22	(Romania) Michael Herck	DPR	34	+1.09.324	17	
16	18	(Italy) Marco Bonanomi	My Team Qi-Meritus Mahara	34	+1.20.001	12	
17	19	(Portugal) Álvaro Parente	My Team Qi-Meritus Mahara	34	+1.31.986	13	
18	15	(United States) Kevin Chen	Fisichella Motor Sport International	32	+2 laps	26	
19	26	(Italy) Frankie Provenzano	Trident Racing	30	+4 laps	24	
20	17	(Italy) Michael Dalle Stelle	Durango	30	+4 laps	25	
Ret	23	(Italy) Giacomo Ricci	DPR	27	Retired	18	
Ret	20	(Spain) Roldán Rodríguez	Piquet GP	10	Retired	5	
Ret	10	(Bahrain) Hamad Al Fardan	GFH Team iSport	9	Retired	21	
Ret	1	(Japan) Sakon Yamamoto	ART Grand Prix	0	Retired	6	
Ret	14	(Venezuela) Rodolfo González	Fisichella Motor Sport International	0	Retired	22	
Ret	24	(Netherlands) Yelmer Buurman	Ocean Racing Technology	0	Retired	23	

=== Sprint race ===
Pos.	No.	Driver	Team	Laps	Time/Retired	Grid	Points
1	6	(Mexico) Sergio Pérez	Barwa International Campos Team	23	39.13.229	7	6+1
2	5	(Russia) Vitaly Petrov	Barwa International Campos Team	23	+2.355	6	5
3	2	(Germany) Nico Hülkenberg	ART Grand Prix	23	+11.929	8	4
4	4	(Italy) Edoardo Mortara	Arden International Motorsport	23	+19.454	2	3
5	16	(Italy) Davide Valsecchi	Durango	23	+21.735	3	2
6	3	(Brazil) Luiz Razia	Arden International Motorsport	23	+22.618	1	1
7	7	(Belgium) Jérôme d'Ambrosio	DAMS	23	+24.029	4	
8	9	(Netherlands) Giedo van der Garde	GFH Team iSport	23	+24.346	12	
9	12	(United Kingdom) James Jakes	Super Nova Racing	23	+25.253	9	
10	11	(Spain) Javier Villa	Super Nova Racing	23	+26.074	13	
11	18	(Italy) Marco Bonanomi	My Team Qi-Meritus Mahara	23	+26.214	16	
12	21	(Brazil) Diego Nunes	Piquet GP	23	+27.942	11	
13	23	(Italy) Giacomo Ricci	DPR	23	+39.846	21	
14	1	(Japan) Sakon Yamamoto	ART Grand Prix	23	+40.391	24	
15	27	(Italy) Davide Rigon	Trident Racing	23	+41.150	14	
16	19	(Portugal) Álvaro Parente	My Team Qi-Meritus Mahara	23	+44.540	17	
17	20	(Spain) Roldán Rodríguez	Piquet GP	23	+45.444	22	
18	8	(Japan) Kamui Kobayashi	DAMS	23	+47.737	5	
19	14	(Venezuela) Rodolfo González	Fisichella Motor Sport International	23	+47.761	25	
20	26	(Italy) Frankie Provenzano	Trident Racing	23	+1.12.342	19	
21	25	(Italy) Fabrizio Crestani	Ocean Racing Technology	23	+1.19.439	10	
22	17	(Italy) Michael Dalle Stelle	Durango	23	+1.28.744	20	
23	15	(United States) Kevin Chen	Fisichella Motor Sport International	22	+1 lap	18	
Ret	22	(Romania) Michael Herck	DPR	16	Retired	15	
Ret	10	(Bahrain) Hamad Al Fardan	GFH Team iSport	11	Retired	23	
DNS	24	(Netherlands) Yelmer Buurman	Ocean Racing Technology	0	Did not start	26	

== Standings after the event ==
Drivers' Championship standings

	Pos.	Driver	Points
	1	(Japan) Kamui Kobayashi	39
	2	(Italy) Davide Valsecchi	29
4	3	(Germany) Nico Hülkenberg	27
2	4	(Mexico) Sergio Pérez	25
2	5	(Spain) Roldán Rodríguez	22

Teams' Championship standings

	Pos.	Team	Points
	1	(France) DAMS	60
2	2	(Spain) Barwa International Campos Team	44
2	3	(France) ART Grand Prix	34
2	4	(Italy) Durango	29
2	5	(Brazil) Piquet GP	22

- Note: Only the top five positions are included for both sets of standings.

== See also ==
- 2009 Qatar Speedcar Series round

== Notes ==
Previous round: 2009 Bahrain 1st GP2 Asia Series round	GP2 Asia Series Championship; 2008–09 season	Next round: 2009 Malaysian GP2 Asia Series round
Previous round: None	Qatar GP2 Asia Series round	Next round: 2024 Lusail Formula 2 round
