= 2009 Bahrain 1st GP2 Asia Series round =

Car racing competition

2009 Bahrain GP2 round
Round details
- Round 3 of 6 rounds in the 2009 GP2 Series
- Location: Bahrain International Circuit in Sakhir, Bahrain
- Course: Permanent racing facility 5.412 km (3.363 mi)

GP2 Series

Feature race
- Date: 23 January 2009
- Laps: 34 (184.008 km)

Pole position
Driver	(Germany) Nico Hülkenberg	ART Grand Prix
- Time: 1:41.351

Podium
First	(Japan) Kamui Kobayashi	DAMS
Second	(Belgium) Jérôme d'Ambrosio	DAMS
Third	(Italy) Edoardo Mortara	Arden International Motorsport

Fastest lap
Driver	(Japan) Kamui Kobayashi	DAMS
- Time: 1:43.604 (on lap 23)

Sprint race
- Date: 24 January 2009
- Laps: 23 (124.476 km)

Podium
First	(Mexico) Sergio Pérez	Barwa Int Campos Team
Second	(Italy) Davide Valsecchi	Durango
Third	(Belgium) Jérôme d'Ambrosio	DAMS

Fastest lap
Driver	(Brazil) Diego Nunes (Note: Diego Nunes set the fastest lap, but did not finish in the top 10, so was ineligible to be the point-scorer for the fastest lap. Jérôme d'Ambrosio was the point-scorer instead for setting the fastest lap of those finishing in the top 10.)	Piquet GP
- Time: 1:43.913 (on lap 5)

The 2009 Bahrain 1st GP2 Asia Series round was a GP2 Asia Series motor race held on 23 and 24 January 2009 at Bahrain International Circuit in Sakhir, Bahrain. It was the third round of the 2008–09 GP2 Asia Series.

== Classification ==
=== Qualifying ===
Pos.	No.	Driver	Team	Time	Gap	Grid
1	2	(Germany) Nico Hülkenberg	ART Grand Prix	1:41.351		1
2	7	(Belgium) Jérôme d'Ambrosio	DAMS	1:41.476	+0.125	2
3	8	(Japan) Kamui Kobayashi	DAMS	1:41.522	+0.172	3
4	4	(Italy) Edoardo Mortara	Arden International Motorsport	1:41.978	+0.627	4
5	20	(Spain) Roldán Rodríguez	Piquet GP	1:42.195	+0.844	5
6	9	(Netherlands) Giedo van der Garde	GFH Team iSport	1:42.307	+0.956	6
7	1	(Japan) Sakon Yamamoto	ART Grand Prix	1:42.344	+0.993	7
8	11	(Spain) Javier Villa	Super Nova Racing	1:42.355	+1.004	8
9	18	(Italy) Marco Bonanomi	My Team Qi-Meritus Mahara	1:42.362	+1.011	9
10	16	(Italy) Davide Valsecchi	Durango	1:42.449	+1.098	10
11	5	(Russia) Vitaly Petrov	Barwa International Campos Team	1:42.458	+1.107	11
12	21	(Brazil) Diego Nunes	Piquet GP	1:42.564	+1.213	12
13	6	(Mexico) Sergio Pérez	Barwa International Campos Team	1:42.632	+1.282	13
14	12	(United Kingdom) James Jakes	Super Nova Racing	1:42.636	+1.285	14
15	19	(New Zealand) Earl Bamber	My Team Qi-Meritus Mahara	1:42.798	+1.447	15
16	10	(Bahrain) Hamad Al Fardan	GFH Team iSport	1:42.818	+1.467	16
17	24	(Netherlands) Yelmer Buurman	Ocean Racing Technology	1:42.833	+1.482	17
18	3	(Brazil) Luiz Razia	Arden International Motorsport	1:43.061	+1.710	18
19	25	(Italy) Fabrizio Crestani	Ocean Racing Technology	1:43.373	+2.022	19
20	27	(Spain) Adrián Vallés	Trident Racing	1:43.401	+2.050	20
21	22	(Romania) Michael Herck	DPR	1:43.413	+2.062	21
22	14	(Venezuela) Rodolfo González	Fisichella Motor Sport International	1:43.701	+2.351	22
23	23	(Italy) Giacomo Ricci	DPR	1:44.043	+2.692	23
24	26	(Italy) Frankie Provenzano	Trident Racing	1:44.325	+2.974	24
25	15	(United States) Kevin Chen	Fisichella Motor Sport International	1:45.281	+3.930	25
26	17	(Italy) Michael Dalle Stelle	Durango	No time		26

=== Feature race ===
Pos.	No.	Driver	Team	Laps	Time/Retired	Grid	Points
1	8	(Japan) Kamui Kobayashi	DAMS	34	1:00:10.318	1	10+1
2	7	(Belgium) Jérôme d'Ambrosio	DAMS	34	+5.892	2	8
3	4	(Italy) Edoardo Mortara	Arden International Motorsport	34	+18.570	4	6
4	2	(Germany) Nico Hülkenberg	ART Grand Prix	34	+19.436	1	5+2
5	16	(Italy) Davide Valsecchi	Durango	34	+20.368	10	4
6	20	(Spain) Roldán Rodríguez	Piquet GP	34	+24.076	5	3
7	9	(Netherlands) Giedo van der Garde	GFH Team iSport	34	+24.748	6	2
8	6	(Mexico) Sergio Pérez	Barwa International Campos Team	34	+27.462	13	1
9	11	(Spain) Javier Villa	Super Nova Racing	34	+30.687	8	
10	5	(Russia) Vitaly Petrov	Barwa International Campos Team	34	+36.702	11	
11	19	(New Zealand) Earl Bamber	My Team Qi-Meritus Mahara	34	+38.042	15	
12	10	(Bahrain) Hamad Al Fardan	GFH Team iSport	34	+51.424	16	
13	21	(Brazil) Diego Nunes	Piquet GP	34	+55.560	12	
14	3	(Brazil) Luiz Razia	Arden International Motorsport	34	+1:06.976	18	
15	26	(Italy) Frankie Provenzano	Trident Racing	34	+1:14.584	24	
16	14	(Venezuela) Rodolfo González	Fisichella Motor Sport International	34	+1:18.339	22	
17	1	(Japan) Sakon Yamamoto	ART Grand Prix	34	+1:18.391	7	
18	22	(Romania) Michael Herck	DPR	34	+1:18.559	21	
19	17	(Italy) Michael Dalle Stelle	Durango	34	+1:46.185	26	
20	18	(Italy) Marco Bonanomi	My Team Qi-Meritus Mahara	33	+1 lap	9	
21	15	(United States) Kevin Chen	Fisichella Motor Sport International	32	+2 laps	25	
22	12	(United Kingdom) James Jakes	Super Nova Racing	31	+3 laps	14	
Ret	23	(Italy) Giacomo Ricci	DPR	21	Retired	23	
Ret	27	(Spain) Adrián Vallés	Trident Racing	13	Retired	20	
Ret	25	(Italy) Fabrizio Crestani	Ocean Racing Technology	0	Retired	19	
Ret	24	(Netherlands) Yelmer Buurman	Ocean Racing Technology	0	Retired	17	

=== Sprint race ===
Pos.	No.	Driver	Team	Laps	Time/Retired	Grid	Points
1	6	(Mexico) Sergio Pérez	Barwa International Campos Team	23	40:14.642	1	6
2	16	(Italy) Davide Valsecchi	Durango	23	+0.749	4	5
3	7	(Belgium) Jérôme d'Ambrosio	DAMS	23	+8.081	7	4+1
4	2	(Germany) Nico Hülkenberg	ART Grand Prix	23	+8.675	5	3
5	11	(Spain) Javier Villa	Super Nova Racing	23	+10.533	9	2
6	8	(Japan) Kamui Kobayashi	DAMS	23	+11.116	8	1
7	19	(New Zealand) Earl Bamber	My Team Qi-Meritus Mahara	23	+15.441	11	
8	4	(Italy) Edoardo Mortara	Arden International Motorsport	23	+16.230	6	
9	3	(Brazil) Luiz Razia	Arden International Motorsport	23	+17.213	14	
10	18	(Italy) Marco Bonanomi	My Team Qi-Meritus Mahara	23	+17.821	20	
11	1	(Japan) Sakon Yamamoto	ART Grand Prix	23	+18.323	17	
12	5	(Russia) Vitaly Petrov	Barwa International Campos Team	23	+25.466	10	
13	24	(Netherlands) Yelmer Buurman	Ocean Racing Technology	23	+29.283	26	
14	9	(Netherlands) Giedo van der Garde	GFH Team iSport	23	+36.850	2	
15	26	(Italy) Frankie Provenzano	Trident Racing	23	+41.242	15	
16	23	(Italy) Giacomo Ricci	DPR	23	+44.677	23	
17	25	(Italy) Fabrizio Crestani	Ocean Racing Technology	23	+45.389	25	
18	22	(Romania) Michael Herck	DPR	23	+50.464	18	
19	27	(Spain) Adrián Vallés	Trident Racing	23	+55.913	24	
20	17	(Italy) Michael Dalle Stelle	Durango	23	+1:04.298	19	
21	15	(United States) Kevin Chen	Fisichella Motor Sport International	23	+1:07.235	21	
22	21	(Brazil) Diego Nunes	Piquet GP	23	+1:09.072	13	
23	20	(Spain) Roldán Rodríguez	Piquet GP	22	+1 lap	3	
Ret	14	(Venezuela) Rodolfo González	Fisichella Motor Sport International	14	Retired	16	
Ret	10	(Bahrain) Hamad Al Fardan	GFH Team iSport	12	Retired	12	
Ret	12	(United Kingdom) James Jakes	Super Nova Racing	8	Retired	22	

== Standings after the event ==
Drivers' Championship standings

	Pos.	Driver	Points
	1	(Japan) Kamui Kobayashi	34
1	2	(Italy) Davide Valsecchi	24
1	3	(Spain) Roldán Rodríguez	22
6	4	(Belgium) Jérôme d'Ambrosio	17
1	5	(Spain) Javier Villa	12

Teams' Championship standings

	Pos.	Team	Points
	1	(France) DAMS	51
1	2	(Italy) Durango	24
1	3	(Brazil) Piquet GP	22
	4	(Spain) Barwa International Campos Team	18
2	5	(France) ART Grand Prix	17

- Note: Only the top five positions are included for both sets of standings.

== See also ==
- 2009 Bahrain 1st Speedcar Series round

== Notes ==
Previous round: 2008 UAE 3rd GP2 Asia Series round	GP2 Asia Series Championship; 2008–09 season	Next round: 2009 Qatar GP2 Asia Series round
Previous round: 2008 Bahrain GP2 Asia Series round	Bahrain GP2 Asia Series round	Next round: 2009 Bahrain 2nd GP2 Asia Series round
