= 2008 UAE 3rd GP2 Asia Series round =

(United Arab Emirates) 2008 UAE GP2 round
Round details
- Round 2 of 6 rounds in the 2008 GP2 Series
- Location: Dubai Autodrome in Dubai, United Arab Emirates
- Course: Permanent racing facility 5.390 km (3.349 mi)

GP2 Series

Feature race
- Date: 5 December 2008
- Laps: 34 (183.260 km)

Pole position
Driver	(Japan) Kamui Kobayashi	DAMS
- Time: 1:41.091

Podium
First	(Japan) Kamui Kobayashi	DAMS
Second	(Italy) Davide Valsecchi	Durango
Third	(Spain) Roldán Rodríguez	Piquet GP

Fastest lap
Driver	(Japan) Kamui Kobayashi	DAMS
- Time: 1:43.079 (on lap 25)

Sprint race
- Date: 6 December 2008
- Laps: 23 (123.970 km)

Podium
First	Race cancelled	N/A
Second	Race cancelled	N/A
Third	Race cancelled	N/A

Fastest lap
Driver	Race cancelled	N/A
- Time: NC

The 2008 UAE 3rd GP2 Asia Series round was a GP2 Asia Series motor race held on 5 and 6 December 2008 at Dubai Autodrome in Dubai, United Arab Emirates. It was the second round of the 2008–09 GP2 Asia Series.

== Classification ==
=== Qualifying ===
Pos.	No.	Driver	Team	Time	Gap	Grid
1	8	(Japan) Kamui Kobayashi	DAMS	1:41.091		1
2	1	(Japan) Sakon Yamamoto	ART Grand Prix	1:41.275	+0.184	2
3	5	(Russia) Vitaly Petrov	Barwa International Campos Team	1:41.341	+0.250	3
4	20	(Spain) Roldán Rodríguez	Piquet GP	1:41.376	+0.285	4
5	16	(Italy) Davide Valsecchi	Durango	1:41.472	+0.381	5
6	24	(Netherlands) Yelmer Buurman	Ocean Racing Technology	1:41.550	+0.459	6
7	9	(Netherlands) Giedo van der Garde	GFH Team iSport	1:41.557	+0.466	7
8	21	(Brazil) Diego Nunes	Piquet GP	1:41.593	+0.502	8
9	6	(Mexico) Sergio Pérez	Barwa International Campos Team	1:41.768	+0.677	9
10	7	(Belgium) Jérôme d'Ambrosio	DAMS	1:41.777	+0.686	10
11	14	(United Arab Emirates) Andreas Zuber	Fisichella Motor Sport International	1:41.798	+0.707	11
12	2	(Venezuela) Pastor Maldonado	ART Grand Prix	1:41.838	+0.747	12
13	4	(Netherlands) Renger van der Zande	Trust Team Arden	1:42.054	+0.963	13
14	11	(Spain) Javier Villa	Super Nova Racing	1:42.062	+0.971	14
15	12	(United Kingdom) James Jakes	Super Nova Racing	1:42.066	+0.975	15
16	19	(New Zealand) Earl Bamber	My Team Qi-Meritus Mahara	1:42.068	+0.977	16
17	3	(Brazil) Luiz Razia	Trust Team Arden	1:42.204	+1.113	17
18	23	(Italy) Giacomo Ricci	DPR	1:42.351	+1.260	18
19	10	(Bahrain) Hamad Al Fardan	GFH Team iSport	1:42.367	+1.276	19
20	26	(Brazil) Alberto Valerio	Trident Racing	1:42.541	+1.450	20
21	18	(Malaysia) Alex Yoong	My Team Qi-Meritus Mahara	1:43.026	+1.935	21
22	22	(Romania) Michael Herck	DPR	1:43.102	+2.011	22
23	25	(Italy) Fabrizio Crestani	Ocean Racing Technology	1:43.316	+2.225	23
24	27	(New Zealand) Chris van der Drift	Trident Racing	1:43.393	+2.302	24
25	17	(Italy) Michael Dalle Stelle	Durango	1:45.603	+4.512	25
26	15	(United States) Kevin Chen	Fisichella Motor Sport International	1:48.411	+7.320	26

=== Feature race ===
Pos.	No.	Driver	Team	Laps	Time/Retired	Grid	Points
1	8	(Japan) Kamui Kobayashi	DAMS	34	1:00:26.439	1	10+2+1
2	16	(Italy) Davide Valsecchi	Durango	34	+14.378	5	8
3	20	(Spain) Roldán Rodríguez	Piquet GP	34	+15.540	4	6
4	9	(Netherlands) Giedo van der Garde	GFH Team iSport	34	+19.403	7	5
5	5	(Russia) Vitaly Petrov	Barwa International Campos Team	34	+27.541	3	4
6	6	(Mexico) Sergio Pérez	Barwa International Campos Team	34	+29.034	9	3
7	7	(Belgium) Jérôme d'Ambrosio	DAMS	34	+34.012	10	2
8	1	(Japan) Sakon Yamamoto	ART Grand Prix	34	+36.080	2	1
9	11	(Spain) Javier Villa	Super Nova Racing	34	+52.219	14	
10	3	(Brazil) Luiz Razia	Trust Team Arden	34	+56.955	17	
11	4	(Netherlands) Renger van der Zande	Trust Team Arden	34	+58.743	13	
12	12	(United Kingdom) James Jakes	Super Nova Racing	34	+1:02.217	15	
13	23	(Italy) Giacomo Ricci	DPR	34	+1:02.854	18	
14	25	(Italy) Fabrizio Crestani	Ocean Racing Technology	34	+1:14.074	23	
15	22	(Romania) Michael Herck	DPR	34	+1:34.638	22	
16	26	(Brazil) Alberto Valerio	Trident Racing	34	+1:41.946	20	
17	17	(Italy) Michael Dalle Stelle	Durango	33	+1 Lap	25	
18	15	(United States) Kevin Chen	Fisichella Motor Sport International	33	+1 Lap	26	
Ret	2	(Venezuela) Pastor Maldonado	ART Grand Prix	30	DNF	12	
Ret	19	(New Zealand) Earl Bamber	My Team Qi-Meritus Mahara	30	DNF	16	
Ret	14	(United Arab Emirates) Andreas Zuber	Fisichella Motor Sport International	30	DNF	11	
Ret	24	(Netherlands) Yelmer Buurman	Ocean Racing Technology	15	DNF	6	
Ret	21	(Brazil) Diego Nunes	Piquet GP	15	DNF	8	
Ret	27	(New Zealand) Chris van der Drift	Trident Racing	13	DNF	24	
Ret	18	(Malaysia) Alex Yoong	My Team Qi-Meritus Mahara	4	DNF	21	
Ret	10	(Bahrain) Hamad Al Fardan	GFH Team iSport	3	DNF	19	

=== Sprint race ===
The sprint race was cancelled due to flooding due to heavy rainfall.

== Standings after the event ==
Drivers' Championship standings

	Pos.	Driver	Points
2	1	(Japan) Kamui Kobayashi	22
1	2	(Spain) Roldán Rodríguez	19
2	3	(Italy) Davide Valsecchi	15
2	4	(Spain) Javier Villa	10
1	5	(New Zealand) Earl Bamber	8

Teams' Championship standings

	Pos.	Team	Points
1	1	(France) DAMS	26
1	2	(Brazil) Piquet GP	19
2	3	(Italy) Durango	15
4	4	(Spain) Barwa International Campos Team	11
2	5	(United Kingdom) Super Nova Racing	10

- Note: Only the top five positions are included for both sets of standings.

== See also ==
- 2008 UAE 3rd Speedcar Series round

Previous round: 2008 Chinese GP2 Asia Series round	GP2 Asia Series Championship; 2008–09 season	Next round: 2009 Bahrain 1st GP2 Asia Series round
Previous round: 2008 UAE 2nd GP2 Asia Series round	UAE GP2 Asia Series round	Next round: None
