= 2009 Qatar Speedcar Series round =

The Grand Prix layout of the Losail International Circuit

The 2009 Qatar Speedcar Series round was the threth round of the 2008–09 Speedcar Series. It was held on 13 and 14 February 2009 at Losail International Circuit in Lusail, Qatar. The race supported the 2009 Qatar GP2 Asia Series round.

== Classification ==
=== Qualifying ===
Pos.	No.	Driver	Team	Time	Gap	Grid
1	20	(Italy) Vitantonio Liuzzi	Union Properties Team	2:04.818		1
2	27	(France) Jean Alesi	HPR	2:04.867	+0.049	2
3	10	(Italy) Gianni Morbidelli	Palm Beach	2:05.323	+0.505	3
4	69	(United Kingdom) Johnny Herbert	JMB Racing	2:05.946	+1.128	4
5	33	(Italy) Marco Melandri	Team Lavaggi	2:06.146	+1.328	5
6	80	(Germany) Heinz-Harald Frentzen	Team Lavaggi	2:06.171	+1.353	6
7	04	(Italy) Thomas Biagi	Durango	2:06.397	+1.579	7
8	85	(United Arab Emirates) Hasher Al Maktoum	Union Properties	2:06.462	+1.644	8
9	96	(Canada) Jacques Villeneuve	Durango	2:06.778	+1.960	9
10	50	(Hong Kong) Marchy Lee	HPR	2:06.882	+2.064	10
11	25	(Austria) Christopher Zoechling	Durango	2:07.133	+2.315	11
12	13	(France) Damien Pasini	JMB	2:07.622	+2.804	12
13	90	(Qatar) Nasser Al-Attiyah	Team Barwa	2:09.478	+4.660	13
14	95	(Qatar) Ahamad Al Kuwari	QMMF Team	2:15.225	+10.407	14
15	59	(Qatar) Fahad Al Thani	QMMF Team	2:22.627	+17.809	15

=== Race 1 ===
Pos.	No.	Driver	Team	Laps	Time/Retired	Grid	Points
1	10	(Italy) Gianni Morbidelli	Palm Beach	20	41:58.910	3	10
2	20	(Italy) Vitantonio Liuzzi	Union Properties Team	20	+2.861	1	8
3	69	(United Kingdom) Johnny Herbert	JMB Racing	20	+10.144	4	6
4	27	(France) Jean Alesi	HPR	20	+12.598	2	5
5	96	(Canada) Jacques Villeneuve	Durango	20	+27.029	9	4
6	85	(United Arab Emirates) Hasher Al Maktoum	Union Properties Team	20	+43.593	8	3
7	04	(Italy) Thomas Biagi	Palm Beach	20	+43.806	7	2
8	33	(Italy) Marco Melandri	Team Lavaggi	20	+51.354	5	1
9	25	(Austria) Christopher Zoechling	Durango	20	+53.757	11	
10	90	(Qatar) Nasser Al-Attiyah	Team Barwa	20	+1:28.523	13	
11	95	(Qatar) Ahamad Al Kuwari	QMMF Team	19	+1 lap	14	
12	59	(Qatar) Fahad Al Thani	QMMF Team	17	+2 laps	15	
Ret	50	(Hong Kong) Marchy Lee	HPR	9	DNF	10	
Ret	80	(Germany) Heinz-Harald Frentzen	Team Lavaggi	6	DNF	6	
Ret	13	(France) Damien Pasini	JMB Racing	2	DNF	12	

=== Race 2 ===
Pos.	No.	Driver	Team	Laps	Time/Retired	Grid	Points
1	20	(Italy) Vitantonio Liuzzi	Union Properties Team	19	40:03.661	7	10
2	10	(Italy) Gianni Morbidelli	Palm Beach	19	+4.554	8	8
3	04	(Italy) Thomas Biagi	Palm Beach	19	+14.021	2	6
4	25	(Austria) Christopher Zoechling	Durango	19	+16.459	9	5
5	80	(Germany) Heinz-Harald Frentzen	Team Lavaggi	19	+18.372	14	4
6	69	(United Kingdom) Johnny Herbert	JMB Racing	19	+23.400	6	3
7	50	(Hong Kong) Marchy Lee	HPR	19	+39.058	12	2
8	13	(France) Damien Pasini	JMB Racing	19	+47.788	15	1
9	90	(Qatar) Nasser Al-Attiyah	Team Barwa	19	+1:03.061	10	
10	59	(Qatar) Fahad Al Thani	QMMF Team	18	+1 lap	12	
11	33	(Italy) Marco Melandri	Team Lavaggi	14	DNF	1	
Ret	27	(France) Jean Alesi	HPR	4	DNF	5	
Ret	95	(Qatar) Ahamad Al Kuwari	QMMF Team	2	DNF	11	
Ret	85	(United Arab Emirates) Hasher Al Maktoum	Union Properties Team	1	DNF	3	
Ret	96	(Canada) Jacques Villeneuve	Durango	0	DNF	4	

== See also ==
- 2009 Qatar GP2 Asia Series round
