= 2009 Bahrain Grand Prix =

Race 4 of 17 in the 2009 Formula One World Championship
← Previous race	Next race →

Race details
- Date: 26 April 2009
- Official name: 2009 Formula 1 Gulf Air Bahrain Grand Prix
- Location: Bahrain International Circuit; Sakhir, Bahrain
- Course: Permanent racing facility
- Course length: 5.412 km (3.363 miles)
- Distance: 57 laps, 308.238 km (191.530 miles)
- Weather: Sunny
- Attendance: 93,680 (Weekend)

Pole position
Driver	(Italy) Jarno Trulli	Toyota
- Time: 1:33.431

Fastest lap
Driver	(Italy) Jarno Trulli	Toyota
- Time: 1:34.556 on lap 10

Podium
First	(United Kingdom) Jenson Button	Brawn-Mercedes
Second	(Germany) Sebastian Vettel	Red Bull-Renault
Third	(Italy) Jarno Trulli	Toyota

The 2009 Bahrain Grand Prix (formally the 2009 Formula 1 Gulf Air Bahrain Grand Prix) was a Formula One motor race held on 26 April 2009 at the Bahrain International Circuit, Sakhir, Bahrain. It was the sixth Bahrain Grand Prix and fourth race of the 2009 Formula One season.

The race was won by Jenson Button driving for Brawn after starting from fourth on the grid. Sebastian Vettel finished second for Red Bull and Jarno Trulli finished third for Toyota. McLaren's Lewis Hamilton drove to a season's best fourth position, followed by the second Brawn of Rubens Barrichello. Kimi Räikkönen picked up Ferrari's first points of the season in sixth, whilst Toyota's Timo Glock and Renault's Fernando Alonso finished in seventh and eighth position.

== Report ==
=== Background ===
Going into the round, Brawn GP driver Jenson Button led the Drivers' Championship by 6 points from teammate Rubens Barrichello. Barrichello led Sebastian Vettel of Red Bull Racing and Timo Glock of Toyota by 5 points in second. Brawn GP led the Chinese Grand Prix winners Red Bull Racing by 16½ points in the Constructors' Championship. Toyota were a further point back and the only other team to hit double figures.

Tyre supplier Bridgestone selected the medium and supersoft tyres for the Grand Prix weekend.

Ferrari were yet to score a point, and failure to do so in Bahrain would have resulted in Ferrari's worst ever start to a season in Formula One. Their previous worst start also came when they were Constructors' Champions; in the 1980 season the team scored no points until the fourth race, the 1980 United States Grand Prix West, where Jody Scheckter finished fifth.

Force India introduced a revised floor and diffuser in Bahrain for the Force India VJM02, as well as an upgraded front wing and reprofiled sidepods. Force India driver Giancarlo Fisichella welcomed the upgrades, hoping the car's lack of downforce would be addressed by the new modifications. BMW Sauber decided to install KERS in Robert Kubica's car for the entire race weekend after it had been tested in free practice in China.

=== Practice ===
Three practice sessions were held before the race; of which two were held on Friday April 24, 2009, with the first in the morning and the second in the afternoon. Both sessions lasted 90 minutes with weather conditions hot and dry throughout. The third session was held on Saturday morning and lasted for 60 minutes.

At the end of the first practice session, Lewis Hamilton set the fastest time of 1:33.647 in his McLaren car, ahead of the two BMW Sauber cars of Nick Heidfeld and Robert Kubica. Williams' Nico Rosberg continued his quick practice form with the fourth fastest time, followed by the Brawn of Jenson Button, the McLaren of Heikki Kovalainen, Brawn's Rubens Barrichello, and Ferrari's Felipe Massa. Red Bull's Mark Webber and the other Ferrari of Kimi Räikkönen shared the ninth fastest time, completing the top ten. Nico Rosberg was fastest in Friday's second practice session, topping the timesheets with a time of 1:33.339, followed by Fernando Alonso in the Renault and Jarno Trulli in the Toyota. The Red Bulls of Sebastian Vettel and Mark Webber were fourth and fifth, with Button close behind. Adrian Sutil of Force India put in an impressive laptime to finish seventh in the standings, with Toyota's Timo Glock, Brawn's Rubens Barrichello, and Williams' Kazuki Nakajima rounding out the top 10. The BMWs of Heidfeld and Kubica could not repeat their times from the first session, and were classified in seventeenth and twentieth, respectively.

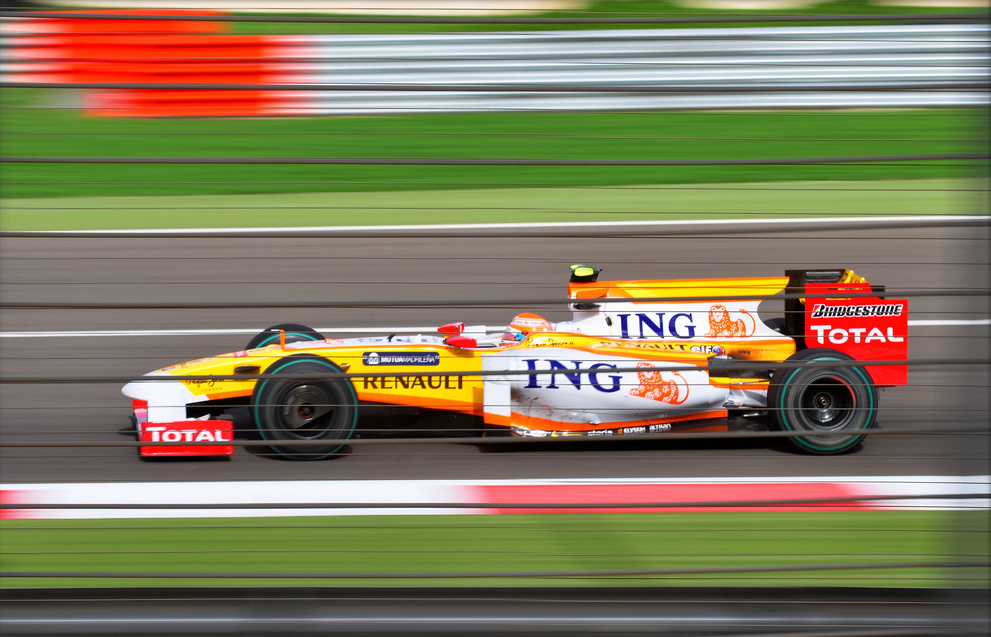
Nelson Piquet Jr. qualified his Renault in fifteenth place; his teammate Fernando Alonso was seventh on the grid.

In third practice, Glock managed the fastest time with a 1:32.605 before his car rolled to a halt due to brake problems, and there were improved times from Ferrari and McLaren. Felipe Massa managed the second fastest time, with Räikkönen in fifth. Rosberg was third fastest, and Hamilton posted the fourth fastest time. Nelson Piquet, Kubica, Nakajima, Trulli and Heidfeld made up the top ten.

=== Qualifying ===
The qualifying session on Saturday afternoon was split into three parts. Jarno Trulli achieved his fourth career pole position, and his first since 2005, whilst his teammate Timo Glock qualified second. This marked the first time Toyota had put both cars on the front row of the grid. Sebastian Vettel qualified third, with Jenson Button behind him. In fifth was the McLaren of Lewis Hamilton, with Rubens Barrichello in sixth. Renault's Fernando Alonso managed seventh place, and behind him Felipe Massa, Nico Rosberg and Kimi Räikkönen completed the top ten. Kovalainen, Nakajima, Kubica, Heidfeld and Piquet made up 11th to 15th on the grid. Those knocked out in the first session and classified 16th to 20th were Sutil, Buemi, Fisichella, Webber and Bourdais. Webber was controversially blocked by Sutil near the end of his qualifying lap (Sutil claimed he didn't realise Webber was on a flying lap), preventing him from posting a fast time. As a result, the stewards gave Sutil a three-place grid penalty, demoting him to 19th position.

=== Race ===
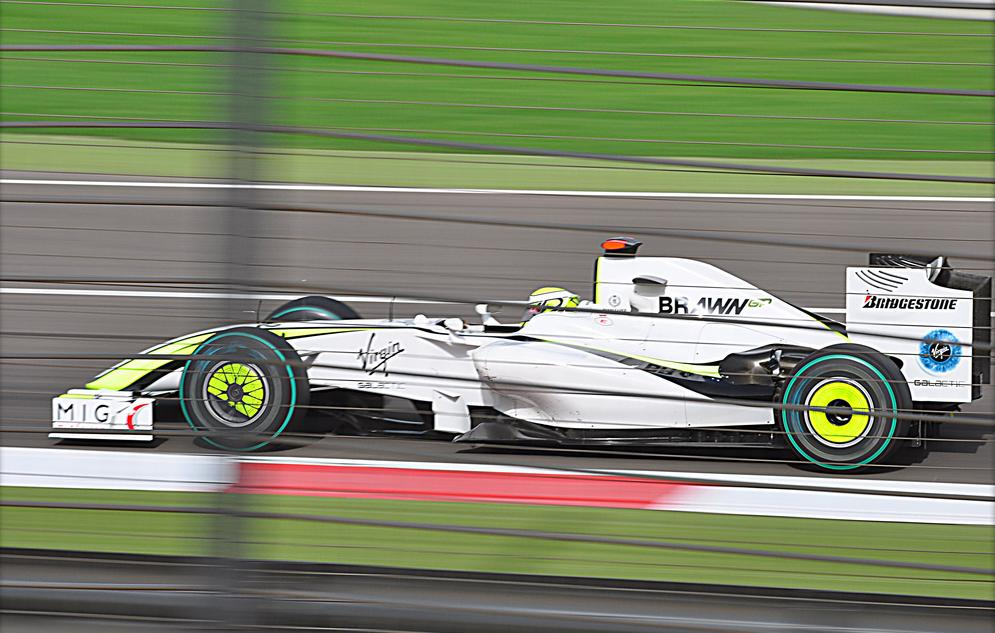
Jenson Button took his third win of the season, extending his championship lead in the process.

Timo Glock got off to a perfect start from second on the grid and took the lead. Jarno Trulli was running second, but had to fight off Lewis Hamilton in the first corner, who had passed Jenson Button and Sebastian Vettel from fifth on the grid after a flying start with the help of his KERS. Button had also overtaken Vettel, who was running a heavier fuel load. Kimi Räikkönen, meanwhile, had pushed his Ferrari up to sixth place, making up four positions from the start. Further back in the field, there was damage sustained to the cars of Felipe Massa, Nick Heidfeld, Robert Kubica and Kazuki Nakajima, all of whom had to pit early to replace their front wings, whilst Heikki Kovalainen lost track position after running wide. Massa also complained of problems with his KERS system due to a temperature problem, and was advised to turn it off.

At the start of lap 2, Button overtook Hamilton to claim third position. The KERS-aided McLaren of Hamilton then kept Vettel's Red Bull at bay, and only when Hamilton entered the pits on lap 15 did Vettel finally pass him.

Since both the Toyotas were running light on fuel, they made their pit stops early, with Glock in on lap 12 and Trulli on lap 14. The Toyota team opted to put both their drivers onto the slower, harder compound tyres for the middle stint of the race, opposite to the strategy being run by the other teams. By the time Button had made his stop on lap 15 on the softer tyres, he had made up enough ground over Trulli in just one lap to come out in front. Glock, who had once led the race, had lost so much time on the tyres that he stayed behind Hamilton in seventh place even after the McLaren driver had completed his pit stop.

Vettel's pit stop on lap 18 placed him ahead of Hamilton, but just thirty metres behind the slower-lapping car of Trulli, preventing him from challenging Button for the lead. Button took this opportunity to pull out a 7.5 second gap between himself and Trulli by lap 22.

By lap 34, Button had increased his lead to 15.6 seconds, putting him in clear control of the race. By the time the second round of pit stops were completed for the front runners, Button was ahead of anyone else, this time on the harder tyres. Toyota's tyre strategy had not paid off, and Vettel, on the softer tyres, put in some fast lap times once Trulli had his second stop and was no longer in Vettel's path. After his own stop, Vettel (now on the harder compound tyre) ended up just in front of the Toyota driver, the very opposite of the situation after the first pit stops.

On lap 44 there was drama with Räikkönen and Glock fighting for sixth position, with the Finn just edging out Glock at turn four. Rubens Barrichello had lost a lot of time earlier in the race after failing to pass the KERS-equipped Renault of Nelson Piquet. However, he showed the pace of the Brawn car by ending up just in front of Räikkönen, even after having one pit stop more, then pulled away from him in the final laps.

On lap 48, spiking oil pressure on the Williams of Nakajima caused the only retirement of the race as he crawled into the pits.

Button drove home to his third victory of the season, 7 seconds clear of Vettel, who was pushing particularly hard in the last laps. Trulli crossed the line 2 seconds behind Vettel, with Hamilton finishing fourth. Barrichello took fifth, Räikkönen sixth, Glock less than a second behind in seventh, and Fernando Alonso finished eighth, 52 seconds behind Button. Nick Heidfeld equalled Michael Schumacher's record of 24 consecutive finishes, bringing home his BMW Sauber in 19th and last place.

After the race, in a press conference, Button said that he burned the top of his left buttock during the race because there was an electrical box in the cockpit of the car. Alonso collapsed in the media room after a drinking water pump failed early in the race and an overheating problem behind his driver's seat left him extremely dehydrated and a first-degree burn behind his back. He lost 6 kg during the race.

== Classification ==
=== Qualifying ===
Cars that used KERS are marked with "‡"

Pos	No	Driver	Constructor	Part 1	Part 2	Part 3	Grid
1	9	(Italy) Jarno Trulli	Toyota	1:32.799	1:32.671	1:33.431	1
2	10	(Germany) Timo Glock	Toyota	1:33.165	1:32.613	1:33.712	2
3	15	(Germany) Sebastian Vettel	Red Bull-Renault	1:32.680	1:32.474	1:34.015	3
4	22	(United Kingdom) Jenson Button	Brawn-Mercedes	1:32.978	1:32.842	1:34.044	4
5	1‡	(United Kingdom) Lewis Hamilton	McLaren-Mercedes	1:32.851	1:32.877	1:34.196	5
6	23	(Brazil) Rubens Barrichello	Brawn-Mercedes	1:33.116	1:32.842	1:34.239	6
7	7‡	(Spain) Fernando Alonso	Renault	1:33.627	1:32.860	1:34.578	7
8	3‡	(Brazil) Felipe Massa	Ferrari	1:33.297	1:33.014	1:34.818	8
9	16	(Germany) Nico Rosberg	Williams-Toyota	1:33.672	1:33.166	1:35.134	9
10	4‡	(Finland) Kimi Räikkönen	Ferrari	1:33.117	1:32.827	1:35.380	10
11	2‡	(Finland) Heikki Kovalainen	McLaren-Mercedes	1:33.479	1:33.242		11
12	17	(Japan) Kazuki Nakajima	Williams-Toyota	1:33.221	1:33.348		12
13	5‡	(Poland) Robert Kubica	BMW Sauber	1:33.495	1:33.487		13
14	6‡	(Germany) Nick Heidfeld	BMW Sauber	1:33.377	1:33.562		14
15	8‡	(Brazil) Nelson Piquet Jr.	Renault	1:33.608	1:33.941		15
16	20	(Germany) Adrian Sutil	Force India-Mercedes	1:33.722			19
17	12	(Switzerland) Sébastien Buemi	Toro Rosso-Ferrari	1:33.753			16
18	21	(Italy) Giancarlo Fisichella	Force India-Mercedes	1:33.910			17
19	14	(Australia) Mark Webber	Red Bull-Renault	1:34.038			18
20	11	(France) Sébastien Bourdais	Toro Rosso-Ferrari	1:34.159			20

- ^1Adrian Sutil was issued a 3 place grid-penalty for impeding Mark Webber during qualifying.

=== Race ===
Pos	No	Driver	Constructor	Laps	Time/Retired	Grid	Points
1	22	(United Kingdom) Jenson Button	Brawn-Mercedes	57	1:31:48.182	4	10
2	15	(Germany) Sebastian Vettel	Red Bull-Renault	57	+7.187	3	8
3	9	(Italy) Jarno Trulli	Toyota	57	+9.170	1	6
4	1‡	(United Kingdom) Lewis Hamilton	McLaren-Mercedes	57	+22.096	5	5
5	23	(Brazil) Rubens Barrichello	Brawn-Mercedes	57	+37.779	6	4
6	4‡	(Finland) Kimi Räikkönen	Ferrari	57	+42.057	10	3
7	10	(Germany) Timo Glock	Toyota	57	+42.880	2	2
8	7‡	(Spain) Fernando Alonso	Renault	57	+52.775	7	1
9	16	(Germany) Nico Rosberg	Williams-Toyota	57	+58.198	9	
10	8‡	(Brazil) Nelson Piquet Jr.	Renault	57	+1:05.149	15	
11	14	(Australia) Mark Webber	Red Bull-Renault	57	+1:07.641	18	
12	2‡	(Finland) Heikki Kovalainen	McLaren-Mercedes	57	+1:17.824	11	
13	11	(France) Sébastien Bourdais	Toro Rosso-Ferrari	57	+1:18.805	20	
14	3‡	(Brazil) Felipe Massa	Ferrari	56	+1 Lap	8	
15	21	(Italy) Giancarlo Fisichella	Force India-Mercedes	56	+1 Lap	17	
16	20	(Germany) Adrian Sutil	Force India-Mercedes	56	+1 Lap	19	
17	12	(Switzerland) Sébastien Buemi	Toro Rosso-Ferrari	56	+1 Lap	16	
18	5‡	(Poland) Robert Kubica	BMW Sauber	56	+1 Lap	13	
19	6‡	(Germany) Nick Heidfeld	BMW Sauber	56	+1 Lap	14	
Ret	17	(Japan) Kazuki Nakajima	Williams-Toyota	48	Oil pressure	12	

== Championship standings after the race ==
Drivers' Championship standings

	Pos.	Driver	Points
	1	(United Kingdom) Jenson Button	31
	2	(Brazil) Rubens Barrichello	19
	3	(Germany) Sebastian Vettel	18
2	4	(Italy) Jarno Trulli	14.5
1	5	(Germany) Timo Glock	12

Constructors' Championship standings

	Pos.	Constructor	Points
	1	(United Kingdom) Brawn-Mercedes	50
	2	(Austria) Red Bull-Renault	27.5
	3	(Japan) Toyota	26.5
	4	(United Kingdom) McLaren-Mercedes	13
1	5	(France) Renault	5

- Note: Only the top five positions are included for both sets of standings.

== See also ==
- 2009 Bahrain 2nd GP2 Asia Series round
- 2009 Bahrain 2nd Speedcar Series round

Previous race: 2009 Chinese Grand Prix	FIA Formula One World Championship; 2009 season	Next race: 2009 Spanish Grand Prix
Previous race: 2008 Bahrain Grand Prix	Bahrain Grand Prix	Next race: 2010 Bahrain Grand Prix
