= Chris Buncombe =

British racing driver (born 1978)

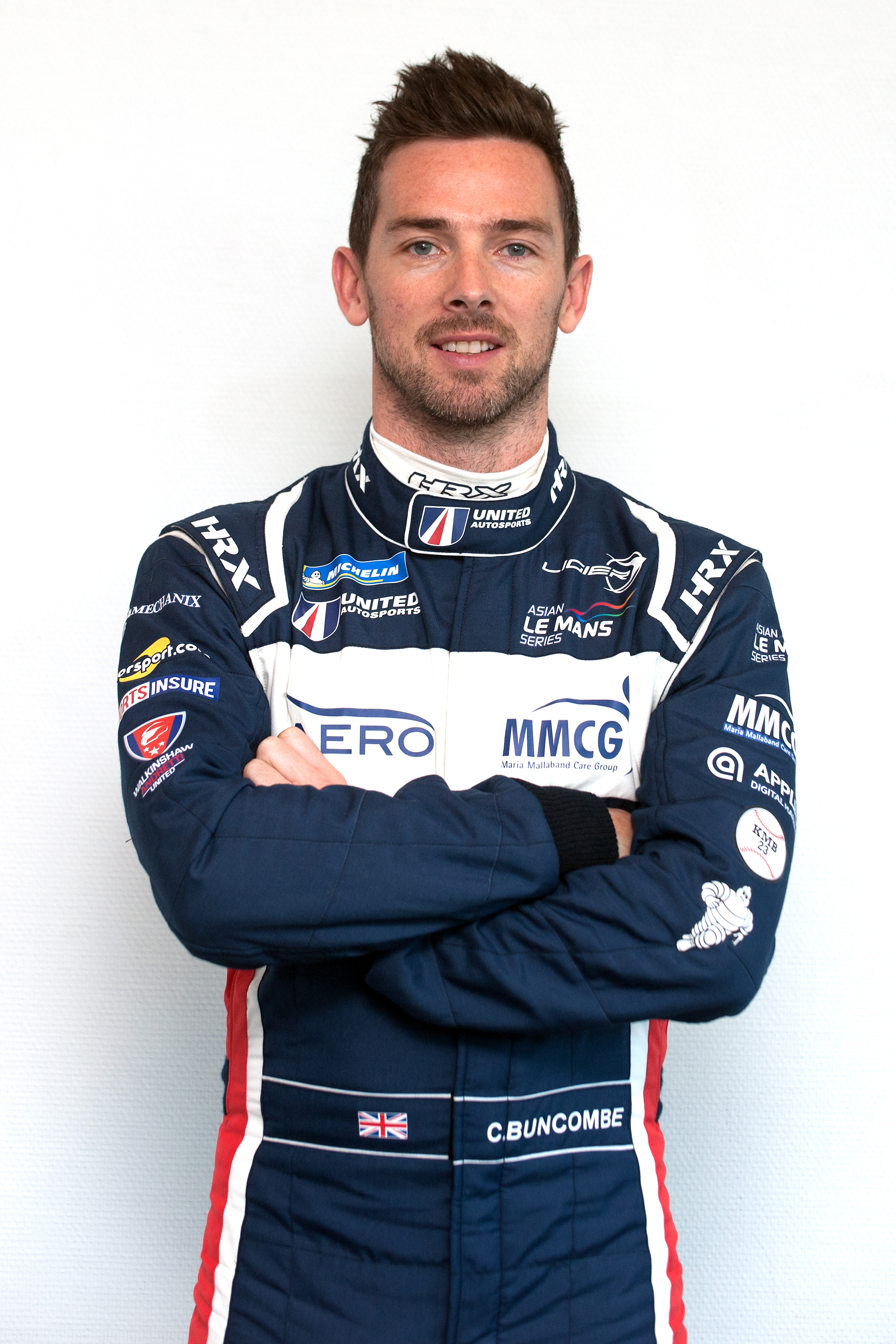
- Buncombe in 2018
- Nationality: (United Kingdom) British
- Born: Christopher James Buncombe; 5 May 1978 (age 48) Taunton, Somerset, England
- Categorisation: FIA Gold (until 2012); FIA Silver (2013–2017); FIA Bronze (2018–)

24 Hours of Le Mans career
- Years: 2007, 2011
- Teams: Binnie Motorsports; Jota
- Best finish: 18th (2007)
- Class wins: 1 (2007)

Christopher James Buncombe (born 5 May 1978 in Taunton, Somerset, England) is a British former racing driver who made his last appearance in the 2020 British GT Championship. He joined Aston Martin Racing at the end of the 2009 season when he drove in the Le Mans Series scoring a podium finish on his debut with the team at Nürburgring driving the 008 Aston Martin LMP1 car. Buncombe won the 2007 24 Hours of Le Mans in the LMP2 class driving for Binnie Motorsports in their Lola B05/40-Zytek.

== Career ==
Season	Series	Team	Races	Wins	Poles	F/Laps	Podiums	Points	Position
1995	Formula Vauxhall Junior Young Driver Scholarship		?	?	?	?	?	?	1st
1996	British Formula Vauxhall Junior Championship	?	?	?	?	?	?	?	?
2000	Spa 24 Hours	RJN Motorsport	1	0	0	0	0	N/A	DNF
2001	Formula Renault 2.0 UK Championship	Aztec International	13	0	0	0	0	123	10th
2002	European Touring Car Championship	RJN Motorsport	2	0	0	0	0	0	NC
2004	FIA GT Championship - GT	JMB Racing	4	0	0	0	0	1	49th
2005	FIA GT Championship - GT2	JMB Racing	1	0	0	0	1	6	22nd
2006	Spa 24 Hours	Team RST	1	0	0	0	0	N/A	DNF
2007	Le Mans Series - LMP2	Binnie Motorsports	5	0	0	0	1	17	6th
2007	24 Hours of Le Mans - LMP2	Binnie Motorsports	1	1	0	0	1	N/A	1st
2008–09	Speedcar Series	Team Lavaggi / Team West-Tec	4	0	0	0	0	2	14th
2009	Le Mans Series - LMP1	Aston Martin Racing	2	0	0	0	1	6	14th
2011	Le Mans Series - LMGTE	Jota Sport AMR	1	0	0	0	0	2	9th
2011	24 Hours of Le Mans - GTE Pro	Jota Sport	1	0	0	0	0	N/A	DNF
2013	Spa 24 Hours	Nissan GT Academy Team RJN	1	0	0	0	0	N/A	DNF
2018	Blancpain GT Series Endurance Cup - Pro-Am Cup	Strakka Racing	7	2	1	2	4	92	1st
2019	Blancpain GT Series Endurance Cup - Pro-Am Cup	Tempesta Racing	4	1	0	0	2	61	5th
2020	British GT Championship	RJN Motorsport	1	0	0	0	0	0	NC

== Family History ==
Chris grew up from a motorsport family. His grandfather, John Buncombe, competed during the 1950s & 1960s. His father, Jonathan Buncombe raced for over 20 years for multiple manufacturers including Ford, GM and early racing career in Minis.

Chris' brother, Alex is a Factory Nissan Nismo driver and the 2015 Blancpain Endurance Series Champion, he has represented Nissan in multiple race series including GT3, GT4, Australian V8 Supercars, Nürburgring 24 Hours, Petit Le Mans and the Le Mans 24 Hours in LMP1.

== 24 Hours of Le Mans results ==
Year	Team	Co-Drivers	Car	Class	Laps	Pos.	Class Pos.	Ref
2007	(United States) Binnie Motorsports	(United States) William Binnie (United Kingdom) Allen Timpany	Lola B05/42-Zytek	LMP2	318	18th	1st	
2011	(United Kingdom) Jota	(United Kingdom) Simon Dolan (United Kingdom) Sam Hancock	Aston Martin V8 Vantage GT2	GTE; Pro	74	DNF	DNF	

Sporting positions
Preceded by Jonathan Adam; Ahmad Al Harthy	Blancpain GT Series Endurance Cup; Pro-Am Champion; 2018; With: Lewis Williamson & Nick Leventis	Succeeded by Charlie Eastwood; Ahmad Al Harthy; Salih Yoluç
