= Speedcar Series =

Former stock car racing series

- Category: Stock cars
- Country: Asia
- Inaugural season: 2008
- Folded: 2009
- Engine suppliers: Menard
- Tyre suppliers: Michelin
- Last Drivers' champion: (Italy) Gianni Morbidelli
- Last Teams' champion: (United Arab Emirates) Union Properties
- Official website: speedcarseries.com

The Speedcar Series Championship was a stock car racing series that was active from January 2008 to June 2009 across two championship seasons. Races were held across several countries, spanning the Middle East and Asia. It featured up to 24 drivers competing in identical V8 620 hp stock cars, deliberately lacking electronic driver aids. Its headquarters were situated at the Dubai Autodrome.

Former Formula One drivers Jacques Villeneuve, Jean Alesi, Heinz-Harald Frentzen, Christian Danner, Johnny Herbert, Stefan Johansson, Narain Karthikeyan, Ukyo Katayama, JJ Lehto, Gianni Morbidelli, Alex Yoong and Vitantonio Liuzzi competed in the Speedcar Series. Herbert and Morbidelli were the two series champions. MotoGP rider Marco Melandri also competed in several races.

As a result of cutbacks, the series' backer, Union Properties, withdrew its support. A rescue deal planned by new series boss Claudio Berro fell through, and the championship was cancelled in June 2009. The British Virgin Islands based company that ran the series was placed into liquidation on 14 June 2010 and its assets put up for sale.

== Technical and sporting regulations ==
The series was a one-make series in that only one type of car was allowed (similar to Porsche Supercup). The car was the Speedcar V8, made by the championship promoter, powered by a V8 620 hp supplied by Menard Competition Technologies. The chassis has been updated for the 2008-09 season.

=== Vehicle Specifications ===
- Chassis: Tubular frame with safety roll cage
- Engine Displacement: Menard Competition Technologies 6.0 L (366 cu in) Pushrod V8
- Transmission: 4 Speed Manual
- Weight: 1,200 kg (2,646 lb) without driver and fuel
- Power Output: 620 hp (462 kW; 629 PS)
- Torque: 680 N⋅m (500 ft⋅lbf)
- Fuel: Unleaded gasoline
- Fuel Capacity: 10 US gal (38 L)
- Fuel Delivery: MoTeC Fuel Injection
- Vehicle Wiring: MoTeC Systems East
- Compression Ratio: 12:1
- Wheelbase: 105 in (2,667 mm)
- Throttle Body Size: 750-830 cubic feet per minute (354-392 liters per second) 4 barrel
- Aspiration: Naturally aspirated
- Steering: Power, recirculating ball
- Tires: Slick tires and rain tires provided by Michelin
- Length: 5,283 mm (208 in)
- Width: 2,032 mm (80 in)
- Height: 1,321 mm (52 in)
- Safety equipment: HANS device, Seat belt 6-point supplied by MOMO

=== Event schedule ===
Speedcar events were held usually over two consecutive days, below the structure of the weekend.

Race day 1:

- Free practice (1 h)
- Qualifying (30 min)
- Race 1 (40 min)

Race day 2:

- Warm-up (20 min)
- Race 2 (40 min)

The grid of race 2 was decided by the race 1 result with top 8 being reversed, so the driver who finished 8th have started from pole position and the winner have started from 8th place.

No refuelling was allowed during either race.

=== Points system ===
The series used the points scoring systems adopted at the time in the majority of the FIA championships.

Position	1st	2nd	3rd	4th	5th	6th	7th	8th
Points	10	8	6	5	4	3	2	1

== Champions ==
Season	Champion	Second	Third	Team Champion
2008	(United Kingdom) Johnny Herbert (Speedcar Team)	(France) David Terrien	(Germany) Uwe Alzen	
2008–09	(Italy) Gianni Morbidelli (Palm Racing)	(United Kingdom) Johnny Herbert	(Italy) Vitantonio Liuzzi	(United Arab Emirates) Union Properties
