= Gianmaria Bruni =

Italian racing driver (born 1981)

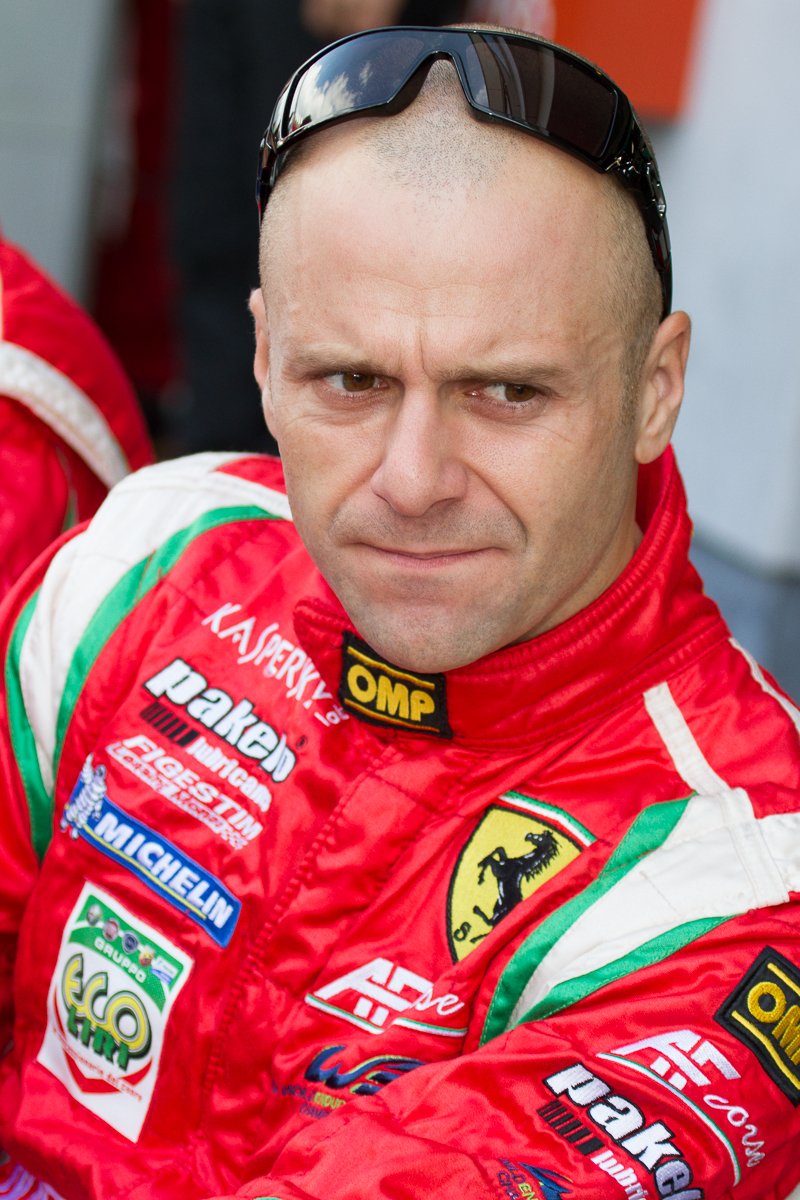
- Gianmaria Bruni in 2012
- Born: 30 May 1981 (age 45) Rome, Italy
- Categorisation: FIA Platinum

Formula One World Championship career
- Nationality: (Italy) Italian
- Active years: 2004
- Team: Minardi
- Entries: 18
- Championships: 0
- Wins: 0
- Podiums: 0
- Career points: 0
- Pole positions: 0
- Fastest laps: 0
- First entry: 2004 Australian Grand Prix
- Last entry: 2004 Brazilian Grand Prix
24 Hours of Le Mans career
- Years: 2008–2016, 2018
- Teams: Risi Competizione, AF Corse
- Best finish: 13th (2011)
- Class wins: 3 (2008, 2012, 2014)

Gianmaria "Gimmi" Bruni (born 30 May 1981) is an Italian Porsche factory auto racing driver who drove in the 2004 Formula One World Championship for Minardi. He is a GP2 Series race winner and is now racing in the FIA World Endurance Championship, in which he gained the 2013 and 2014 GT Drivers' Titles whilst driving as a factory Ferrari driver. He won the 2008 FIA GT Championship, 2011 Le Mans Series and 2012 International GT Open and took three class victories at the 24 Hours of Le Mans, in 2008, 2012 and 2014. He also was successful at the 2009 and 2015 24 Hours of Spa-Francorchamps, 2010 12 Hours of Sebring and 2011 Petit Le Mans.

== Career ==
=== First wins in single-seaters ===
Born in Rome, at the age of ten, Bruni lied about his age to the director of La Pista d'Oro, a go kart track in Italy, in order to begin an amateur karting career (twelve was the minimum age to compete). His first experience with racing cars was in the Italian Formula Renault Campus in 1997; he won the championship in 1998. For the following season, he moved on to the European Formula Renault Eurocup 2.0, taking another title. Then he entered the British Formula 3, where he came fifth in 2000 and fourth in 2001. After he had raced in various similar European series like the Euro Formula 3000, finishing third in 2003, he caught the attention of Minardi.

=== Formula 1 ===
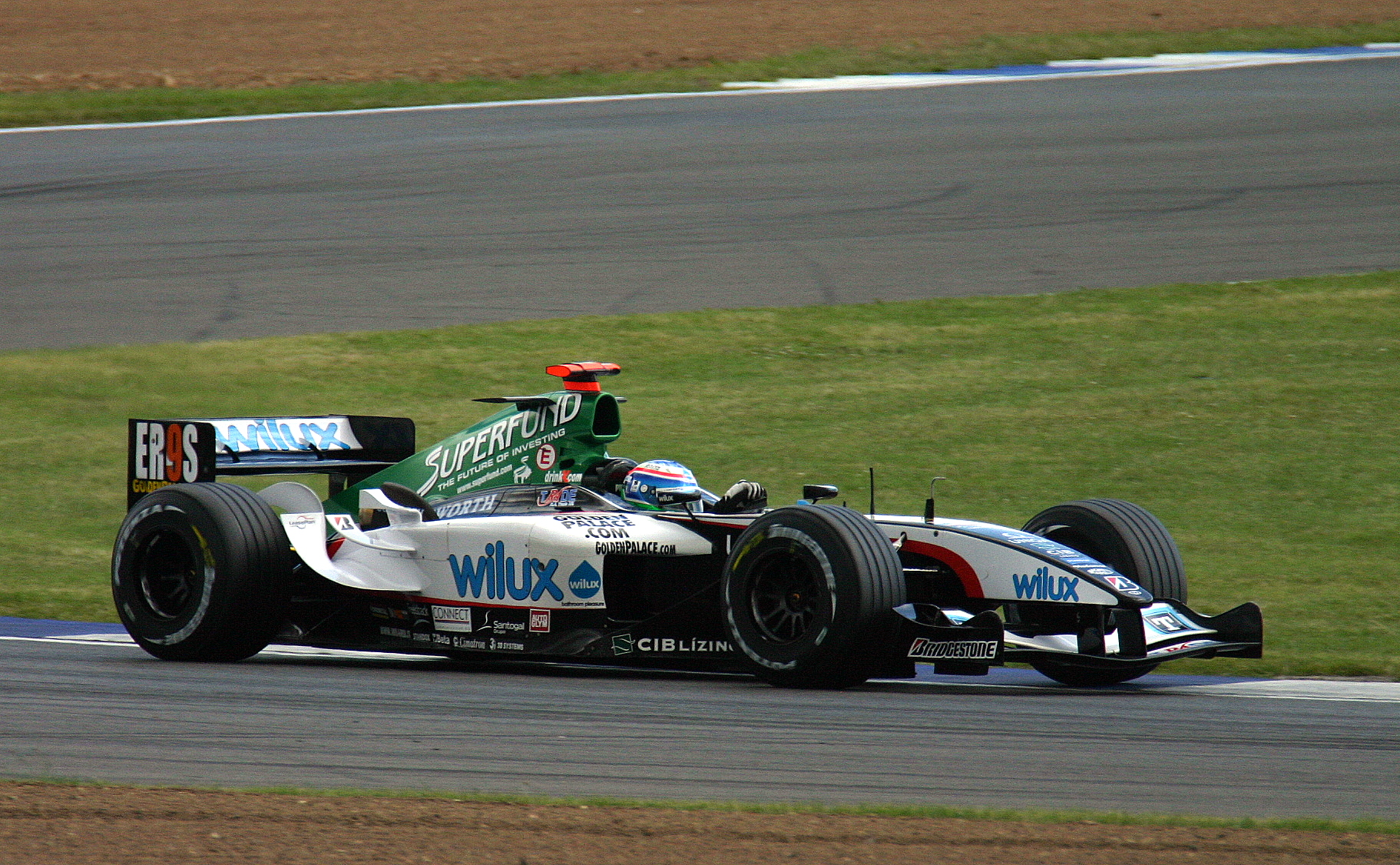
Bruni driving for Minardi during the 2004 British Grand Prix.

Bruni started testing for Minardi in 2003. However, the biggest struggle of his career was finding enough sponsorship to compete for them in Formula 1 in 2004.

In fact, Bruni did join Minardi for the 2004 Formula 1 season, though he struggled in a car which was considerably less developed than the rest of the grid. He was one of only two drivers to contest the majority of the season without scoring any points.

=== GP2 Series ===
In 2005, Bruni competed in the GP2 Series, the single-seater Championship which is part of the Formula 1 support package and which is intended to be its feeder series. He won the first race at Barcelona and took second at Monaco, driving for Coloni. Bruni left the team in September before the Monza weekend. Joining up with Durango, he started on pole position at Spa-Francorchamps and finished tenth in the Drivers' Classification.

In 2006, Bruni competed again in the GP2 Series, this time with the new Trident Racing squad. He scored two victories, the first at Imola and the second at Hockenheim. At the end of the season, he was seventh in the Drivers' Classification.

=== GT competitions ===
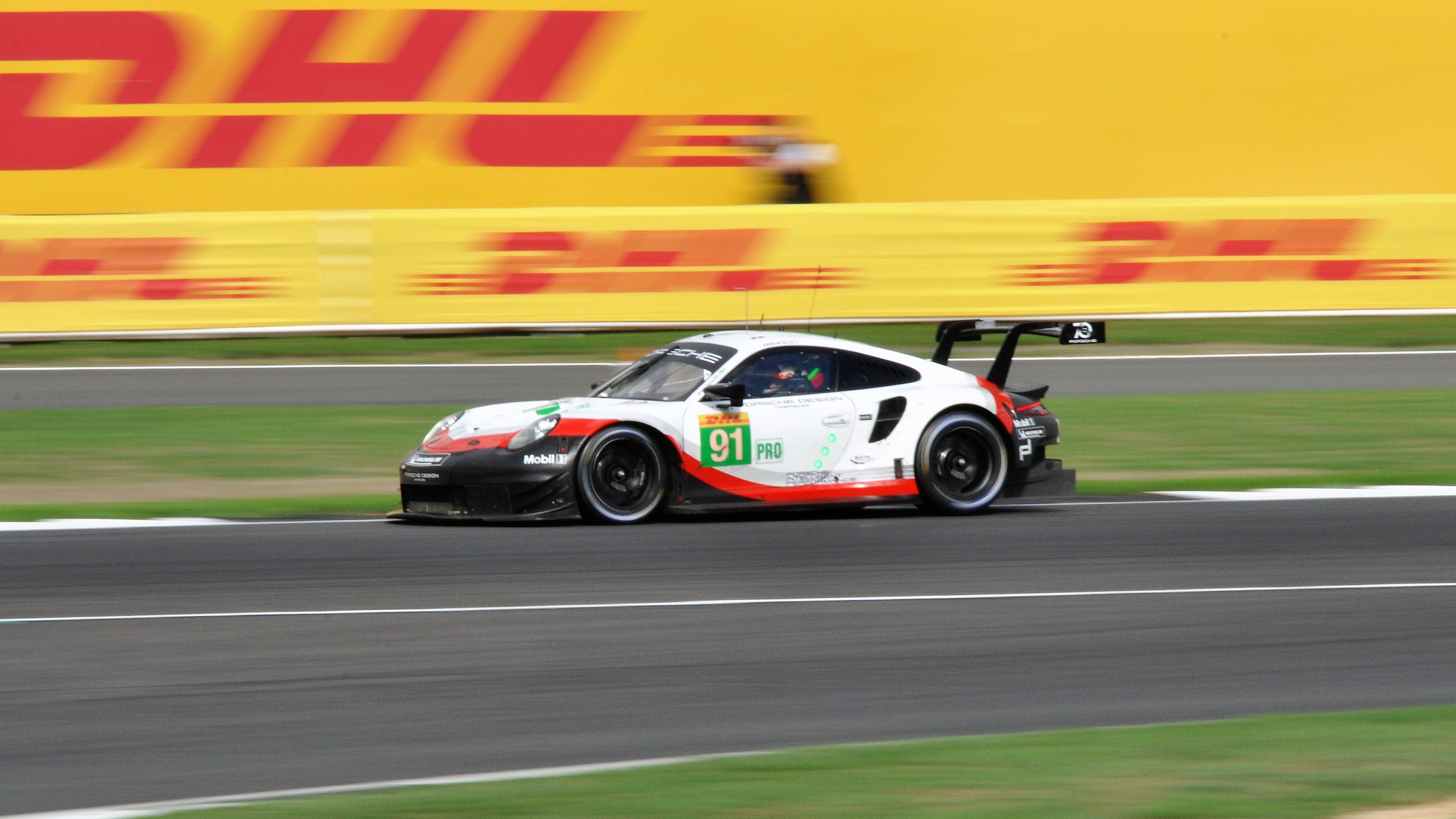
Bruni driving in the 2018 6 Hours of Silverstone.

For 2007, Bruni switched to sports car racing as he joined the FIA GT Championship with Team AF Corse Motorole in a Ferrari 430 GT3. He and his teammate Stéphane Ortelli finished the season second in the GT2 class with three wins.

After competing in the American Le Mans Series for Risi Competizione, Bruni shifted focus to Europe for 2011, teaming with Giancarlo Fisichella in an AF Corse Ferrari F458 Italia, winning the driver's and team's championship in the LM GTE Pro class of the Le Mans Series and helping win the team's championship in the Intercontinental Le Mans Cup. Bruni finished second at the Le Mans 24hrs and won the Petit Le Mans.

At the 2012 12 Hours of Sebring, Bruni disqualified his car by attempting to shunt off the BMW M3 GT of Joey Hand on the last lap to help the sister car of Olivier Beretta to win the overall grand touring classification, though the BMW was in a different class and the car would not have classified anyway because it did not make 70% of the race leader's distance.

In the 80th edition of the 24 Hours of Le Mans in 2012, Bruni and the AF Corse Team scored first place in the GTE-Pro class along with his co-drivers Toni Vilander and Giancarlo Fisichella; their Ferrari 458 Italia covered a total of 336 laps (2,845.53 miles) of the Circuit de la Sarthe.

Bruni scored three wins and two second places at the 2013 FIA World Endurance Championship, so he won the GTE-Pro teams trophy and the GTE drivers and manufacturers cups.

In February 2017, Ferrari and Bruni announced that, by mutual consent, they had early terminated their relationship. After a collaboration that started in 2007, Bruni would leave Ferrari at the end of June of that year. He then signed a contract with Porsche.

As a result of the contract termination settlement, Bruni sat out the first half of the 2017 racing season, making his Porsche debut in July at Watkins Glen. In 2018, he raced for Porsche in the WEC, replacing Frédéric Makowiecki.

== Racing record ==
=== Career summary ===
| Season | Series | Team | Races | Wins | Poles | F/Laps | Podiums | Points | Position |
|---|---|---|---|---|---|---|---|---|---|
| 1997 | Formula Renault Campus Italy | ? | ? | ? | ? | ? | ? | ? | ? |
| 1998 | Formula Renault Campus Italy | ? | ? | ? | ? | ? | ? | ? | 1st |
| 1999 | Formula Renault Eurocup | JD Motorsport | ? | 4 | ? | ? | ? | 216 | 1st |
| 2000 | British Formula Three Championship | Fortec Motorsports | 14 | 0 | 0 | 1 | 2 | 95 | 5th |
| 2001 | British Formula Three Championship | Fortec Motorsports | 26 | 1 | 0 | 1 | 7 | 156 | 5th |
| 2002 | Euro Formula 3000 Championship | Scuderia Coloni | 2 | 0 | 0 | 0 | 1 | 5 | 12th |
| 2002 | Euro Formula 3000 Championship | ADM Motorsport | 1 | 0 | 0 | 0 | 0 | 5 | 12th |
| 2002 | FIA Sportscar Championship - SR1 | Durango | 2 | 0 | 0 | 0 | 0 | 8 | 21st |
| 2003 | Euro Formula 3000 Series | ADM Motorsport | 7 | 3 | 1 | 1 | 3 | 30 | 3rd |
| 2003 | Formula One | Trust Minardi Cosworth | Test Driver | | | | | | |
| 2004 | Formula One | Wilux Minardi Cosworth | 18 | 0 | 0 | 0 | 0 | 0 | 25th |
| 2005 | GP2 Series | Coloni Motorsport | 17 | 1 | 0 | 2 | 2 | 35 | 10th |
| 2005 | GP2 Series | Durango | 4 | 0 | 1 | 0 | 0 | 35 | 10th |
| 2006 | GP2 Series | Trident Racing | 21 | 2 | 2 | 1 | 2 | 33 | 7th |
| 2007 | FIA GT Championship - GT2 | Virgo Motorsport | 12 | 3 | ? | ? | 8 | 66 | 2nd |
| 2007 | Le Mans Series - GT2 | Virgo Motorsport | 1 | 0 | 0 | 0 | 0 | 10 | 12th |
| 2007 | American Le Mans Series - GT2 | Risi Competizione | 4 | 0 | 0 | 0 | 0 | 48 | 16th |
| 2008 | FIA GT Championship - GT2 | AF Corse | 13 | 5 | ? | ? | 13 | 93 | 1st |
| 2008 | Le Mans Series - GT2 | Virgo Motorsport | 4 | 3 | 2 | 0 | 3 | 30 | 3rd |
| 2008 | American Le Mans Series - GT2 | Risi Competizione | 1 | 0 | 0 | 0 | 0 | 0 | NC |
| 2008 | 24 Hours of Le Mans - GT2 | Risi Competizione | 1 | 1 | 0 | 0 | 1 | N/A | 1st |
| 2009 | FIA GT Championship - GT2 | AF Corse | 8 | 3 | ? | ? | 5 | 54 | 2nd |
| 2009 | Le Mans Series - GT2 | JMW Motorsport | 5 | 2 | 1 | 1 | 4 | 35 | 2nd |
| 2009 | American Le Mans Series - GT2 | Pecom Racing Team | 1 | 0 | 0 | 0 | 0 | 26 | 27th |
| 2009 | 24 Hours of Le Mans - GT2 | AF Corse | 1 | 0 | 0 | 0 | 0 | N/A | 6th |
| 2010 | Le Mans Series - GT2 | AF Corse | 4 | 2 | 1 | 0 | 3 | 50 | 4th |
| 2010 | American Le Mans Series - GT | Risi Competizione | 9 | 1 | 0 | 0 | 2 | 140 | 2nd |
| 2010 | 24 Hours of Le Mans - GT2 | Risi Competizione | 1 | 0 | 0 | 0 | 0 | N/A | N/A |
| 2011 | Le Mans Series - GTE Pro | AF Corse | 5 | 2 | 0 | 0 | 4 | 60 | 1st |
| 2011 | American Le Mans Series - GT | AF Corse | 2 | 0 | 0 | 0 | 0 | 0 | NC |
| 2011 | 24 Hours of Le Mans - GTE Pro | AF Corse | 1 | 0 | 0 | 0 | 1 | N/A | 2nd |
| 2012 | FIA World Endurance Championship - GTE Pro | AF Corse | 7 | 3 | 0 | 1 | 5 | 3 | 62nd |
| 2012 | International GT Open - GT | AF Corse | 16 | 2 | 4 | 5 | 7 | 195 | 1st |
| 2012 | 24 Hours of Le Mans - GTE Pro | AF Corse | 1 | 1 | 0 | 0 | 1 | N/A | 1st |
| 2013 | FIA World Endurance Championship - GTE Pro | AF Corse | 8 | 3 | 1 | 1 | 5 | 145 | 1st |
| 2013 | 24 Hours of Le Mans - GTE Pro | AF Corse | 1 | 0 | 0 | 0 | 0 | N/A | 6th |
| 2014 | FIA World Endurance Championship - GTE Pro | AF Corse | 8 | 4 | 4 | 1 | 5 | 168 | 1st |
| 2014 | 24 Hours of Le Mans - GTE Pro | AF Corse | 1 | 1 | 0 | 0 | 1 | N/A | 1st |
| 2015 | FIA World Endurance Championship - GTE Pro | AF Corse | 8 | 2 | 3 | 2 | 4 | 131.5 | 2nd |
| 2015 | 24 Hours of Le Mans - GTE Pro | AF Corse | 1 | 0 | 0 | 0 | 1 | N/A | 3rd |
| 2016 | FIA World Endurance Championship - GTE Pro | AF Corse | 9 | 1 | 1 | 1 | 7 | 128 | 3rd |
| 2016 | 24 Hours of Le Mans - GTE Pro | AF Corse | 1 | 0 | 0 | 0 | 0 | N/A | N/A |
| 2017 | IMSA SportsCar Championship - GTLM | Porsche GT Team | 6 | 0 | 1 | 0 | 2 | 186 | 10th |
| 2018 | IMSA SportsCar Championship - GTLM | Porsche GT Team | 2 | 0 | 0 | 0 | 1 | 55 | 15th |
| 2018 | 24 Hours of Le Mans - GTE Pro | Porsche GT Team | 1 | 0 | 0 | 0 | 1 | N/A | 2nd |
| 2018–19 | FIA World Endurance Championship - GTE Pro | Porsche GT Team | 8 | 1 | 1 | 1 | 4 | 131 | 3rd |
| 2019 | 24 Hours of Le Mans - GTE Pro | Porsche GT Team | 1 | 0 | 0 | 0 | 1 | N/A | 2nd |
| 2019–20 | FIA World Endurance Championship - GTE Pro | Porsche GT Team | 8 | 1 | 3 | 0 | 3 | 111 | 7th |
| 2020 | 24 Hours of Le Mans - GTE Pro | Porsche GT Team | 1 | 0 | 0 | 0 | 0 | N/A | 5th |
| 2021 | FIA World Endurance Championship - GTE Pro | Porsche GT Team | 6 | 0 | 0 | 1 | 3 | 111 | 3rd |
| 2021 | 24 Hours of Le Mans - GTE Pro | Porsche GT Team | 1 | 0 | 0 | 0 | 0 | N/A | 4th |
| 2022 | FIA World Endurance Championship - GTE Pro | Porsche GT Team | 6 | 1 | 1 | 1 | 2 | 125 | 4th |
| 2022 | 24 Hours of Le Mans - GTE Pro | Porsche GT Team | 1 | 1 | 0 | 0 | 1 | N/A | 1st |
| 2023 | European Le Mans Series - LMP2 Pro-Am | Proton Competition | 4 | 0 | 0 | 0 | 0 | 26 | 15th |
| 2023 | IMSA SportsCar Championship - GTP | Proton Competition | 3 | 0 | 0 | 0 | 1 | 814 | 15th |
| 2023 | FIA World Endurance Championship - Hypercar | Proton Competition | 3 | 0 | 0 | 0 | 0 | 4 | 20th |
| 2024 | IMSA SportsCar Championship - GTP | Proton Competition | 9 | 0 | 0 | 1 | 0 | 2372 | 9th |
| 2025 | IMSA SportsCar Championship - GTP | JDC–Miller MotorSports | 7 | 0 | 0 | 0 | 0 | 1680 | 14th |
| 2025 | European Le Mans Series - LMGT3 | JMW Motorsport | 6 | 0 | 0 | 0 | 0 | 11 | 18th |

=== Complete British Formula Three Championship results ===
(key) (Races in bold indicate pole position; races in italics indicate fastest lap)

| Year | Entrant | Chassis | Engine | Class | 1 | 2 | 3 | 4 | 5 | 6 | 7 | 8 | 9 | 10 | 11 | 12 | 13 | 14 | 15 | 16 | 17 | 18 | 19 | 20 | 21 | 22 | 23 | 24 | 25 | 26 | 27 | DC | Points |
|---|---|---|---|---|---|---|---|---|---|---|---|---|---|---|---|---|---|---|---|---|---|---|---|---|---|---|---|---|---|---|---|---|---|
| 2000 | Fortec Motorsport | Dallara F399 | Mugen-Honda | Championship | THR; 7 | CRO; 4 | OUL; 6 | DON; 7 | DON; Ret | SIL; 5 | BRH; 8 | DON; 2 | DON; 4 | CRO; 19 | SIL; 3 | SNE; Ret | SPA; 4 | SIL; 5 | | | | | | | | | | | | | | 5th | 95 |
| 2001 | Fortec Motorsport | Dallara F301 | Renault Sodemo | Championship | SIL; 1; 5 | SIL; 2; 2 | SNE; 1; 3 | SNE; 2; 10 | DON; 1; 3 | DON; 2; 6 | OUL; 1; 2 | OUL; 2; 9 | CRO; 1 Ret | CRO; 2; 5 | ROC; 1 DNS | ROC; 2 Ret | CAS; 1; 8 | CAS; 2; 11 | BRH; 1; 8 | BRH; 2; 10 | DON; 1; 1 | DON; 2; 7 | KNO; 1; 6 | KNO; 2 C | THR; 1 Ret | THR; 2; 3 | THR; 3; 11 | BRH; 1; 7 | BRH; 2; 8 | SIL; 1; 5 | SIL; 2; 3 | 5th | 156 |

=== Complete Euro Formula 3000 Series results ===
(key) (Races in bold indicate pole position; races in italics indicate fastest lap)

| Year | Entrant | 1 | 2 | 3 | 4 | 5 | 6 | 7 | 8 | 9 | 10 | DC | Points |
|---|---|---|---|---|---|---|---|---|---|---|---|---|---|
| 2002 | Scuderia Coloni | VLL; 6 | NÜR; C | PER; 3 | MNZ | DON | | | | | | 12th | 5 |
| 2002 | ADM Motorsport | | | | | | SPA; 9 | BRN | DIJ | JER | CAG | 12th | 5 |
| 2003 | ADM Motorsport | NÜR; 1 | MAG; 1 | PER; Ret | MNZ; Ret | SPA; 9 | **DON**; 1 | BRN; Ret | JER | CAG | | 3rd | 30 |

=== Complete Formula One results ===
(key) (Races in bold indicate pole position; races in italics indicate fastest lap)

| Year | Entrant | Chassis | Engine | 1 | 2 | 3 | 4 | 5 | 6 | 7 | 8 | 9 | 10 | 11 | 12 | 13 | 14 | 15 | 16 | 17 | 18 | WDC | Pts |
|---|---|---|---|---|---|---|---|---|---|---|---|---|---|---|---|---|---|---|---|---|---|---|---|
| 2003 | Trust Minardi Cosworth | Minardi PS03 | Cosworth CR-3 3.0 V10 | AUS | MAL | BRA | SMR | ESP | AUT | MON | CAN | EUR | FRA | GBR | GER; TD | HUN; TD | ITA; TD | USA; TD | JPN; TD | | | – | – |
| 2004 | Wilux Minardi Cosworth | Minardi PS04B | Cosworth CR-3L 3.0 V10 | AUS; NC | MAL; 14 | BHR; 17 | SMR; Ret | ESP; Ret | MON; Ret | EUR; 14 | CAN; Ret | USA; Ret | FRA; 18^{†} | GBR; 16 | GER; 17 | | | | | | | 25th | 0 |
| 2004 | Minardi Cosworth | Minardi PS04B | Cosworth CR-3L 3.0 V10 | | | | | | | | | | | | | HUN; 14 | BEL; Ret | ITA; Ret | CHN; Ret | JPN; 16 | BRA; 17 | 25th | 0 |

^{†} Did not finish the race, but was classified as he had completed more than 90% of the race distance.

=== Complete GP2 Series results ===
(key) (Races in bold indicate pole position) (Races in italics indicate fastest lap)

| Year | Entrant | 1 | 2 | 3 | 4 | 5 | 6 | 7 | 8 | 9 | 10 | 11 | 12 | 13 | 14 | 15 | 16 | 17 | 18 | 19 | 20 | 21 | 22 | 23 | DC | Points |
|---|---|---|---|---|---|---|---|---|---|---|---|---|---|---|---|---|---|---|---|---|---|---|---|---|---|---|
| 2005 | Coloni Motorsport | IMO; FEA; 4 | IMO; SPR; 4 | CAT; FEA; 1 | CAT; SPR; Ret | MON; FEA; 2 | NÜR; FEA; 8 | NÜR; SPR; Ret | MAG; FEA; 18 | MAG; SPR; 11 | SIL; FEA; 7 | SIL; SPR; 11 | HOC; FEA; NC | HOC; SPR; 14 | HUN; FEA; 10 | HUN; SPR; 8 | IST; FEA; Ret | IST; SPR; 9 | MNZ; FEA | MNZ; SPR | | | | | 10th | 35 |
| 2005 | Durango | | | | | | | | | | | | | | | | | | | | **SPA**; **FEA**; Ret | SPA; SPR; 16 | BHR; FEA; Ret | BHR; SPR; 14 | 10th | 35 |
| 2006 | Trident Racing | VAL; FEA; 6 | VAL; SPR; 5 | **IMO**; **FEA**; 1 | IMO; SPR; Ret | NÜR; FEA; Ret | NÜR; SPR; 16 | CAT; FEA; Ret | CAT; SPR; 17 | MON; FEA; Ret | SIL; FEA; Ret | SIL; SPR; 15 | MAG; FEA; Ret | MAG; SPR; Ret | **HOC**; **FEA**; 1 | HOC; SPR; 6 | HUN; FEA; Ret | HUN; SPR; 8 | IST; FEA; Ret | IST; SPR; 15 | MNZ; FEA; Ret | MNZ; SPR; 9 | | | 7th | 33 |

=== Complete European Le Mans Series results ===
(key) (Races in bold indicate pole position; races in italics indicate fastest lap)

| Year | Entrant | Class | Chassis | Engine | 1 | 2 | 3 | 4 | 5 | 6 | Pos. | Points |
|---|---|---|---|---|---|---|---|---|---|---|---|---|
| 2007 | Virgo Motorsport | GT2 | Ferrari F430GT | Ferrari 4.0 L V8 | MNZ | VAL | NÜR | SPA | **SIL**; 1 | INT | 12th | 10 |
| 2008 | Virgo Motorsport | GT2 | Ferrari F430GT | Ferrari 4.0 L V8 | **CAT**; 1 | MNZ; Ret | **SPA**; 1 | NÜR; 1 | SIL | | 3rd | 30 |
| 2009 | JMW Motorsport | GT2 | Ferrari F430 GT2 | Ferrari 4.0 L V8 | **CAT**; 2 | SPA; 2 | ALG; 1 | NÜR; 9 | SIL; 1 | | 2nd | 35 |
| 2010 | AF Corse | GT2 | Ferrari F430 GT2 | Ferrari 4.0 L V8 | **LEC**; Ret | SPA; 2 | **ALG**; 1 | HUN | SIL; 1 | | 4th | 50 |
| 2011 | AF Corse | GTE Pro | Ferrari 458 Italia GT2 | Ferrari 4.5 L V8 | **LEC**; 2 | SPA; 1 | IMO; 2 | SIL; 1 | EST; Ret | | 1st | 60 |
| 2012 | Pecom Racing | LMP2 | Oreca 03 | Nissan VK45DE 4.5 L V8 | LEC; 7 | DON | PET | | | | 14th | 6 |
| 2018 | Proton Competition | LMGTE | Porsche 911 RSR | Porsche 4.0 L Flat-6 | LEC | MNZ; 5 | RBR | SIL | SPA | ALG | 12th | 10 |
| 2021 | WeatherTech Racing | LMGTE | Porsche 911 RSR-19 | Porsche 4.2 L Flat-6 | **CAT**; 2 | RBR | LEC; 4 | MNZ; 9 | SPA | ALG; 5 | 12th | 43 |
| 2022 | Proton Competition | LMGTE | Porsche 911 RSR-19 | Porsche 4.2 L Flat-6 | LEC; 2 | IMO; Ret | **MNZ**; 2 | CAT; 1 | SPA; 5 | ALG; 5 | 1st | 82 |
| 2023 | Proton Competition | LMP2 Pro-Am | Oreca 07 | Gibson GK428 4.2 L V8 | CAT; 6 | LEC; 6 | ARA; 5 | SPA; Ret | ALG | ALG | 15th | 26 |
| 2025 | JMW Motorsport | LMGT3 | Ferrari 296 GT3 | Ferrari F163CE 3.0 L Turbo V6 | CAT; 12 | LEC; 10 | IMO; 6 | SPA; 11 | SIL; 9 | ALG; 11 | 18th | 11 |

=== Complete FIA World Endurance Championship results ===
(key) (Races in bold indicate pole position; races in italics indicate fastest lap)

| Year | Entrant | Class | Car | Engine | 1 | 2 | 3 | 4 | 5 | 6 | 7 | 8 | 9 | Rank | Points |
|---|---|---|---|---|---|---|---|---|---|---|---|---|---|---|---|
| 2012 | AF Corse | LMGTE Pro | Ferrari 458 Italia GT2 | Ferrari 4.5L V8 | SEB; EX | SPA; 2 | LMS; 1 | SIL; 1 | SÃO; 1 | BHR | FUJ; 2 | SHA; Ret | | 62nd | 3 |
| 2013 | AF Corse | LMGTE Pro | Ferrari 458 Italia GT2 | Ferrari 4.5L V8 | SIL; 5 | **SPA**; 1 | LMS; 5 | SÃO; 1 | COA; 2 | FUJ; 2 | SHA; 4 | BHR; 1 | | 1st | 145 |
| 2014 | AF Corse | LMGTE Pro | Ferrari 458 Italia GT2 | Ferrari 4.5 L V8 | **SIL**; 4 | **SPA**; 1 | **LMS**; 1 | **COA**; 3 | FUJ; 1 | SHA; Ret | BHR; 1 | SÃO; 4 | | **1st** | **168** |
| 2015 | AF Corse | LMGTE Pro | Ferrari 458 Italia GT2 | Ferrari 4.5 L V8 | SIL; 1 | SPA; 4 | LMS; 4 | **NÜR**; 14 | COA; 7 | FUJ; 1 | **SHA**; 2 | **BHR**; 2 | | 2nd | 131.5 |
| 2016 | AF Corse | LMGTE Pro | Ferrari 488 GTE | Ferrari F154CB 3.9 L Turbo V8 | SIL; 2 | SPA; Ret | **LMS**; Ret | NÜR; 1 | MEX; 2 | COA; 2 | FUJ; 3 | SHA; 3 | BHR; 2 | 3rd | 128 |
| 2018–19 | Porsche GT Team | LMGTE Pro | Porsche 911 RSR | Porsche 4.0 L Flat-6 | SPA; 4 | **LMS**; 2 | SIL; DSQ | FUJ; 5 | SHA; 2 | SEB; 1 | SPA; 8 | LMS; 2 | | 3rd | 131 |
| 2019–20 | Porsche GT Team | LMGTE Pro | Porsche 911 RSR-19 | Porsche 4.2 L Flat-6 | SIL; 1 | **FUJ**; 6 | SHA; 3 | **BHR**; 5 | COA; 8 | SPA; 5 | **LMS**; 9 | BHR; 2 | | 7th | 111 |
| 2021 | Porsche GT Team | LMGTE Pro | Porsche 911 RSR-19 | Porsche 4.2 L Flat-6 | SPA; 4 | ALG; 4 | MNZ; 3 | LMS; 3 | BHR; 2 | BHR; 4 | | | | 3rd | 111 |
| 2022 | Porsche GT Team | LMGTE Pro | Porsche 911 RSR-19 | Porsche 4.2 L Flat-6 | SEB; 3 | **SPA**; 5 | LMS; 1 | MNZ; 5 | FUJ; 4 | **BHR**; 4 | | | | 4th | 125 |
| 2023 | Proton Competition | Hypercar | Porsche 963 | Porsche 4.6 L Turbo V8 | SEB | ALG | SPA | LMS | MNZ; Ret | FUJ; 9 | BHR; 10 | | | 20th | 4 |

=== Complete 24 Hours of Le Mans results ===
| Year | Team | Co-Drivers | Car | Class | Laps | Pos. | Class Pos. |
|---|---|---|---|---|---|---|---|
| 2008 | (United States) Risi Competizione | (Finland) Mika Salo (Brazil) Jaime Melo | Ferrari F430 GT2 | GT2 | 326 | 19th | **1st** |
| 2009 | (Italy) AF Corse | (Argentina) Luís Pérez Companc (Argentina) Matías Russo | Ferrari F430 GT2 | GT2 | 317 | 26th | 6th |
| 2010 | (United States) Risi Competizione | (Brazil) Jaime Melo (Germany) Pierre Kaffer | Ferrari F430 GT2 | GT2 | 116 | DNF | DNF |
| 2011 | (Italy) AF Corse | (Italy) Giancarlo Fisichella (Finland) Toni Vilander | Ferrari 458 Italia GT2 | GTE; Pro | 314 | 13th | **2nd** |
| 2012 | (Italy) AF Corse | (Italy) Giancarlo Fisichella (Finland) Toni Vilander | Ferrari 458 Italia GT2 | GTE; Pro | 336 | 17th | **1st** |
| 2013 | (Italy) AF Corse | (Italy) Giancarlo Fisichella (Italy) Matteo Malucelli | Ferrari 458 Italia GT2 | GTE; Pro | 311 | 21st | 6th |
| 2014 | (Italy) AF Corse | (Italy) Giancarlo Fisichella (Finland) Toni Vilander | Ferrari 458 Italia GT2 | GTE; Pro | 339 | 13th | **1st** |
| 2015 | (Italy) AF Corse | (Italy) Giancarlo Fisichella (Finland) Toni Vilander | Ferrari 458 Italia GT2 | GTE; Pro | 330 | 25th | **3rd** |
| 2016 | (Italy) AF Corse | (United Kingdom) James Calado (Italy) Alessandro Pier Guidi | Ferrari 488 GTE | GTE; Pro | 179 | DNF | DNF |
| 2018 | (Germany) Porsche GT Team | (Austria) Richard Lietz (France) Frédéric Makowiecki | Porsche 911 RSR | GTE; Pro | 343 | 16th | **2nd** |
| 2019 | (Germany) Porsche GT Team | (Austria) Richard Lietz (France) Frédéric Makowiecki | Porsche 911 RSR | GTE; Pro | 342 | 21st | **2nd** |
| 2020 | (Germany) Porsche GT Team | (Austria) Richard Lietz (France) Frédéric Makowiecki | Porsche 911 RSR-19 | GTE; Pro | 335 | 31st | 5th |
| 2021 | (Germany) Porsche GT Team | (Austria) Richard Lietz (France) Frédéric Makowiecki | Porsche 911 RSR-19 | GTE; Pro | 343 | 23rd | 4th |
| 2022 | (Germany) Porsche GT Team | (Austria) Richard Lietz (France) Frédéric Makowiecki | Porsche 911 RSR-19 | GTE; Pro | 350 | 28th | **1st** |

=== Complete IMSA SportsCar Championship results ===
(key) (Races in bold indicate pole position) (Races in italics indicate fastest lap)

| Year | Team | Class | Car | Engine | 1 | 2 | 3 | 4 | 5 | 6 | 7 | 8 | 9 | 10 | 11 | Rank | Points | Ref |
|---|---|---|---|---|---|---|---|---|---|---|---|---|---|---|---|---|---|---|
| 2014 | Risi Competizione | GTLM | Ferrari 458 Italia GT2 | Ferrari F142 4.5 L V8 | DAY; 11 | SEB; 11 | LBH | LGA | WGL | MOS | IMS | ELK | VIR | COA | PET | 33rd | 42 | |
| 2015 | AF Corse | GTLM | Ferrari 458 Italia GT2 | Ferrari F142 4.5 L V8 | DAY; 10 | SEB | LBH | LGA | WGL | MOS | LIM | ELK | VIR | COA | PET | 27th | 22 | |
| 2016 | SMP Racing | GTLM | Ferrari 488 GTE | Ferrari F154CB 3.9 L V8 | DAY; 10 | SEB | LBH | LGA | WGL | MOS | LIM | ELK | VIR | COA | PET | 28th | 22 | |
| 2017 | Porsche GT Team | GTLM | Porsche 911 RSR | Porsche 4.0 L Flat-6 | DAY | SEB | LBH | COA | WGL; 6 | MOS; 6 | **LIM**; 2 | ELK; 2 | VIR; 7 | LGA; 7 | PET; 5 | 10th | 186 | |
| 2018 | Porsche GT Team | GTLM | Porsche 911 RSR | Porsche 4.0 L Flat-6 | DAY; 6 | SEB; 3 | LBH | MDO | WGL | MOS | LIM | ELK | VIR | LGA | PET | 15th | 55 | |
| 2021 | WeatherTech Racing | GTLM | Porsche 911 RSR-19 | Porsche 4.2 L Flat-6 | DAY; 6 | SEB | DET | WGL | WGL | LIM | ELK | LGA | LBH | VIR | PET | 15th | 280 | |
| 2023 | Proton Competition | LMP2 | Oreca 07 | Gibson GK428 V8 | DAY; 1† | SEB | | LGA | WGL | | | | | | | NC† | 0† | |
| 2023 | Proton Competition | GTP | Porsche 963 | Porsche 9RD 4.6 L V8 | | | LBH | | | MOS | ELK; 8 | IMS; 9 | PET; 3 | | | 15th | 814 | |
| 2024 | Proton Competition Mustang Sampling | GTP | Porsche 963 | Porsche 9RD 4.6 L V8 | DAY; 5 | SEB; 8 | LBH; 5 | LGA; 10 | DET; 9 | WGL; 7 | ELK; 5 | IMS; 5 | PET; 6 | | | 9th | 2372 | |
| 2025 | JDC–Miller MotorSports | GTP | Porsche 963 | Porsche 9RD 4.6 L V8 | DAY; 6 | SEB; 8 | LBH; 10 | LGA; 9 | DET; 11 | WGL; 10 | ELK; 10 | IMS | PET | | | 14th | 1680 | |

^{†} Points only counted towards the Michelin Endurance Cup, and not the overall LMP2 Championship.

=== Complete 24 Hours of Daytona results ===
| Year | Team | Co-Drivers | Car | Class | Laps | Pos. | Class Pos. |
|---|---|---|---|---|---|---|---|
| 2014 | (United States) Risi Competizione | (Monaco) Olivier Beretta (Italy) Giancarlo Fisichella (Italy) Matteo Malucelli | Ferrari 458 Italia GT2 | GTLM | 88 | DNF | DNF |
| 2015 | (Italy) AF Corse | (France) Emmanuel Collard (France) François Perrodo (Finland) Toni Vilander | Ferrari 458 Italia GT2 | GTLM | 211 | DNF | DNF |
| 2016 | (Russia) SMP Racing | (Italy) Andrea Bertolini (United Kingdom) James Calado (Russia) Viktor Shaytar | Ferrari 488 GTE | GTLM | 557 | DNF | DNF |
| 2018 | (United States) Porsche GT Team | (New Zealand) Earl Bamber (Belgium) Laurens Vanthoor | Porsche 911 RSR | GTLM | 774 | 17th | 6th |
| 2021 | (United States) WeatherTech Racing | (France) Kévin Estre (Austria) Richard Lietz (United States) Cooper MacNeil | Porsche 911 RSR-19 | GTLM | 760 | 17th | 6th |
| 2023 | (Germany) Proton Competition | (Australia) James Allen (Italy) Francesco Pizzi (United States) Fred Poordad | Oreca 07 | LMP2 | 761 | 7th | 1st |
| 2024 | (Germany) Proton Competition Mustang Sampling | (France) Romain Dumas (Switzerland) Neel Jani (Belgium) Alessio Picariello | Porsche 963 | GTP | 791 | 5th | 5th |

Sporting positions
| Preceded by Bruno Besson | Eurocup Formula Renault; Champion; 1999 | Succeeded by Felipe Massa |
| Preceded by Marc Lieb; Richard Lietz (GT2) | Le Mans Series; LMGTE Pro Champion; 2011; With: Giancarlo Fisichella | Succeeded by Jonny Cocker |
| Preceded by Soheil Ayari | International GT Open; Champion; 2012; With: Federico Leo | Succeeded by Andrea Montermini |
| Preceded by Inaugural | FIA World Endurance Cup for GT Drivers; 2013–2014; With: Toni Vilander (2014) | Succeeded by Richard Lietz |
| Preceded by Miguel Molina; Matteo Cressoni; Rino Mastronardi | European Le Mans Series; LMGTE Champion; 2022; With: Christian Ried & Lorenzo Ferrari | Succeeded by Alessio Picariello; Zacharie Robichon; Ryan Hardwick |
