= Augusto Farfus =

Brazilian racing driver (born 1983)

Augusto Farfus Jr.
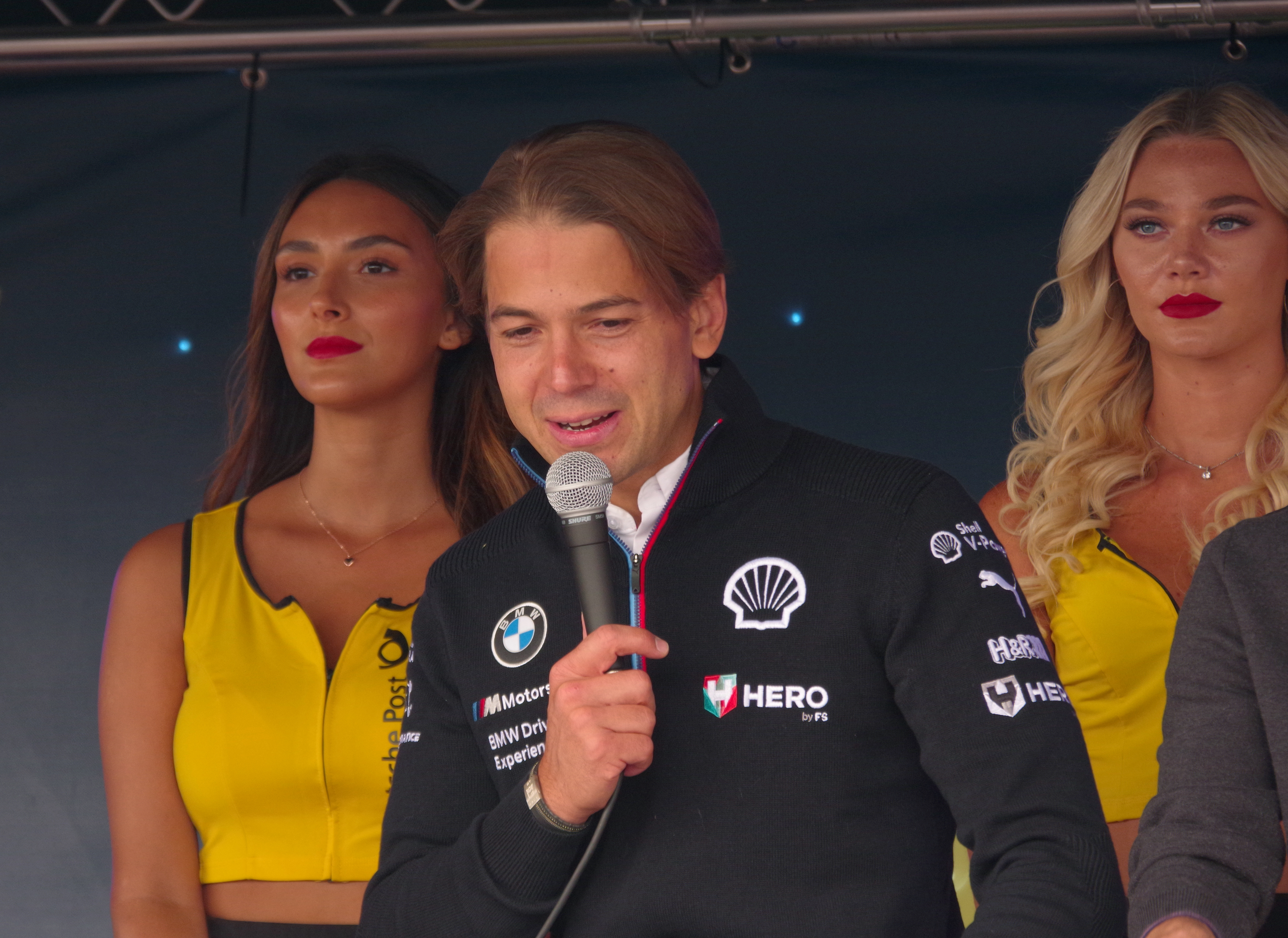
- Farfus in 2018
- Nationality: (Brazil) Brazilian
- Born: Augusto Celestino Farfus dos Santos Jr. 3 September 1983 (age 43) Curitiba, Paraná, Brazil
- Relatives: Vicky Farfus (daughter)

DTM career
- Debut season: 2012
- Current team: BMW Team RMG
- Categorisation: FIA Platinum
- Car number: 18
- Former teams: BMW Team MTEK, BMW Team RBM
- Starts: 103
- Wins: 4
- Podiums: 13
- Poles: 6
- Fastest laps: 2
- Best finish: 2nd in 2013
- Finished last season: 16th (56 pts)

Previous series
- 2011 2005–10 2004 2002–03 2000–01 2000–01: Intercontinental Le Mans Cup; WTCC; ETCC; Euro Formula 3000; Formula Renault 2000 Eurocup; Italian Formula Renault

Championship titles
- 2020 2003 2001: Intercontinental GT Challenge; Euro Formula 3000; Eurocup Formula Renault 2.0

24 Hours of Le Mans career
- Years: 2010, 2011, 2018, 2019, 2020, 2024, 2025, 2026
- Teams: BMW Motorsport, Aston Martin Racing, Team WRT
- Best finish: 2nd
- Class wins: 0

Augusto Celestino Farfus dos Santos Jr. (born 3 September 1983) is a Brazilian professional racing driver, and BMW Motorsport works driver since 2007. He lives in Monaco.

Once a test driver for BMW Sauber in Formula One, Farfus competed in the WTCC between 2005 and 2010, and DTM between 2012 and 2018. He has been most successful in GT racing, winning the Nürburgring 24 Hours in 2010 and 2025, and the Intercontinental GT Challenge in 2020 alongside Nicky Catsburg. Farfus has also won at Bathurst, Macau, and twice at Daytona for BMW.

== Early years ==
Born in Curitiba, Farfus first tasted racing in minibike races and won the local championships in 1991.

Like many drivers, Farfus' motorsport career began with karting. In 1992, at the age of nine, he won the Paraná state championship (cadet class), and mainly competed in São Paulo states championship from 1993 to 1998. In 1999, he succeeded in both winning the Italian Winter Cup and finishing runner-up in the North American Championship. He is married to Elirane Johnsson.

== Formula racing ==
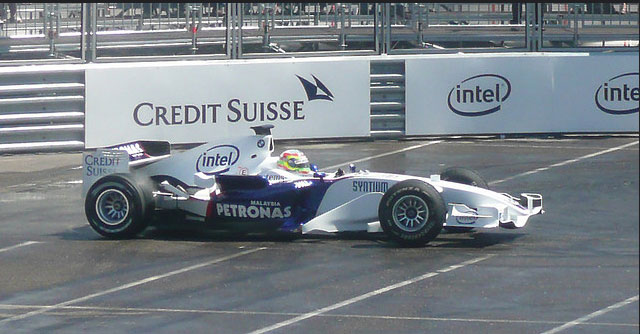
Farfus demonstrating the BMW Sauber F1.07.

In 2000, Farfus moved to Italy and competed in the Formula Renault Italian championship and the Eurocup series for the next two years, winning the Eurocup in 2001.

For 2002, Farfus joined Draco Racing in Euro Formula 3000. In 2003, he won the Euro Formula 3000 Championship aged just 20 years old.

== Touring cars ==
=== Alfa Romeo ===
From 2004 to 2006, Farfus was a factory Alfa Romeo (N.Technology) driver in the European Touring Car Championship and later, the World Touring Car Championship.

In the 2006 season, Farfus fought for the title against Andy Priaulx and Jörg Müller until the final race in Macau, but a string of bad results and too many retirements meant he ended the season in third place.

=== BMW ===
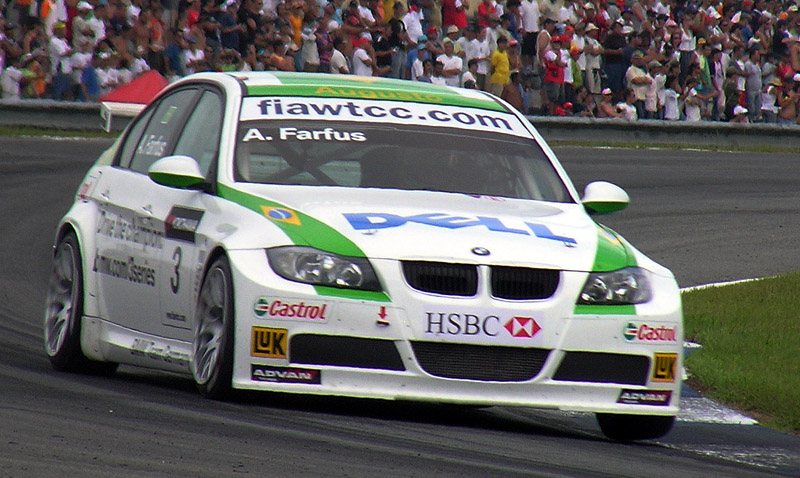
Farfus driving a BMW 320si (BMW Team Germany) at Curitiba in the 2007 World Touring Car Championship season.

Before the 2007 season, Farfus switched to the Schnitzer BMW-run squad, BMW Team Germany, alongside the German, 2006 season runner-up, Jörg Müller. He temporarily led the championship during the season, but ended this season in fourth place as Priaulx won. He continued with the team through the 2008 season and into 2009. He scored six wins in 2009, missing out on the title to SEAT's Gabriele Tarquini at the final meeting In 2010, BMW's participation in the WTCC was limited to a two-car line-up, as Farfus joined Andy Priaulx at the Racing Bart Mampaey team. Farfus scored no wins, however he won race 2 at Okayama on the road, but he and teammate Priaulx were disqualified by running a non-homologated gearbox that did not conform to the technical regulations. On 5 December 2010, BMW announced it was withdrawing from the WTCC, but would continue to supply customer teams with its 320TC car.

On 25 January 2011, it was announced that Farfus would contest the Intercontinental Le Mans Cup with BMW, which would also include its former WTCC drivers Andy Priaulx, Jörg Müller and Dirk Muller.

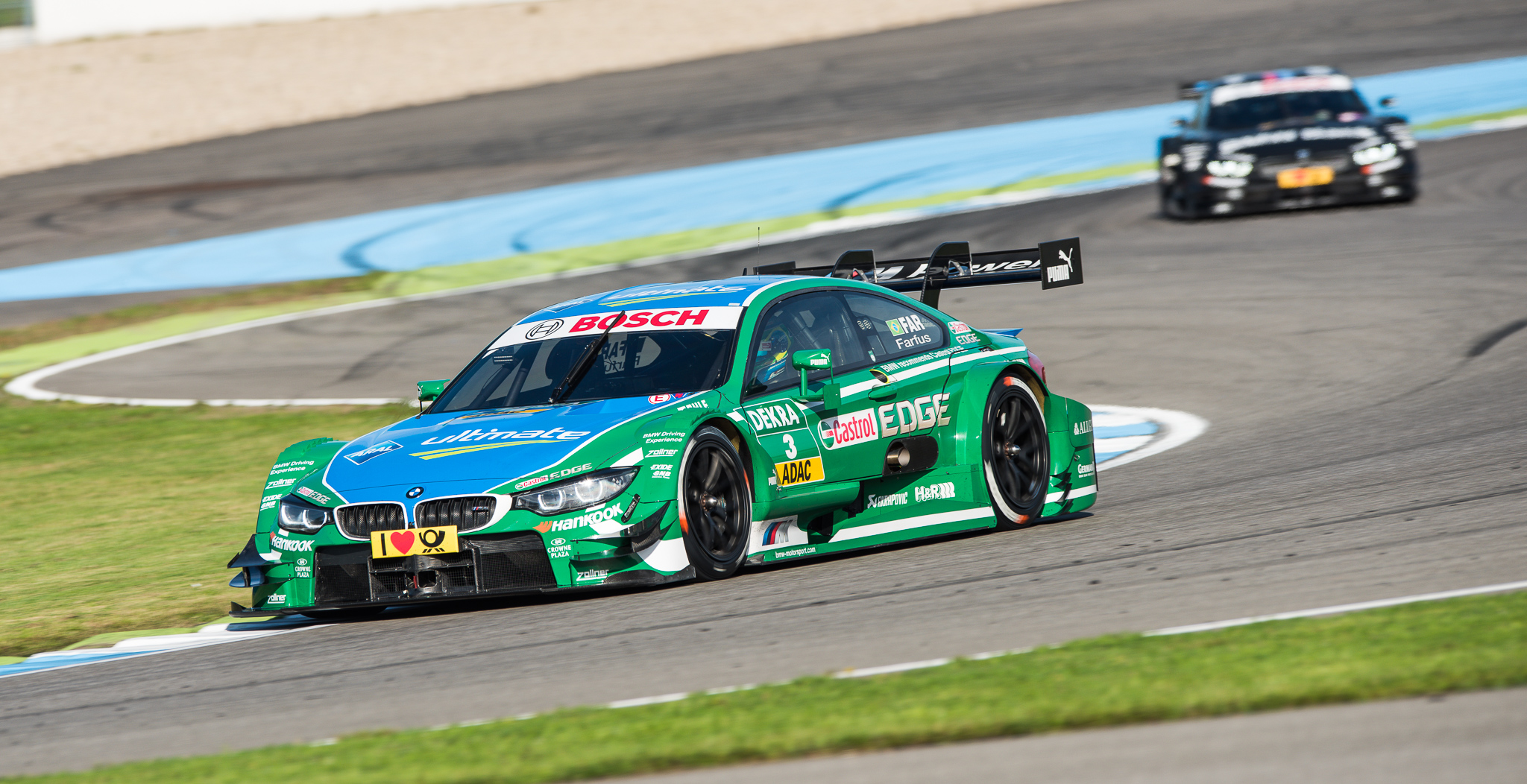
Farfus competing in the 2014 DTM season

=== Hyundai ===
On 3 December 2018, it was announced that Farfus would join Hyundai for the 2019 World Touring Car Cup season, partnering the series's inaugural driver's champion, Gabriele Tarquini, Norbert Michelisz and Nicky Catsburg.

== Racing record ==
=== Career summary ===
| Season | Series | Team | Races | Wins | Poles | F/Laps | Podiums | Points | Position |
|---|---|---|---|---|---|---|---|---|---|
| 2000 | Formula Renault 2000 Italia | Cram Competition | 9 | 1 | 1 | 1 | 1 | 46 | 10th |
| 2000 | Formula Renault 2000 Eurocup | Cram Competition | 8 | 0 | 0 | 0 | 0 | 10 | 21st |
| 2001 | Formula Renault 2000 Eurocup | RC Motorsport | 10 | 4 | 3 | 1 | 4 | 160 | **1st** |
| 2001 | Formula Renault 2000 Italia | RC Motorsport | 4 | 0 | 1 | 1 | 2 | 50 | 9th |
| 2002 | Euro Formula 3000 | Draco Junior Team | 9 | 0 | 0 | 0 | 1 | 8 | 9th |
| 2003 | Euro Formula 3000 | Draco Junior Team | 9 | 4 | 5 | 4 | 8 | 60 | **1st** |
| 2003 | Rolex Sports Car Series - GT | JMB Racing | 1 | 0 | 0 | 0 | 0 | 24 | 30th |
| 2004 | European Touring Car Championship | AutoDelta Squadra Corse | 19 | 0 | 2 | 3 | 7 | 54 | 6th |
| 2005 | World Touring Car Championship | Alfa Romeo Racing Team | 20 | 1 | 1 | 0 | 4 | 65 | 4th |
| 2006 | World Touring Car Championship | N.Technology | 20 | 3 | 2 | 2 | 6 | 64 | **3rd** |
| 2007 | World Touring Car Championship | BMW Team Germany | 21 | 3 | 0 | 2 | 6 | 71 | 4th |
| 2007 | Formula One | BMW Sauber F1 Team | Test driver | | | | | | |
| 2008 | World Touring Car Championship | BMW Team Germany | 24 | 2 | 3 | 6 | 4 | 63 | 6th |
| 2008 | 24 Hours of Nürburgring - S1 | Motorsport Arena Oschersleben | 1 | 1 | 1 | 1 | 1 | N/A | **1st** |
| 2009 | World Touring Car Championship | BMW Team Germany | 24 | 6 | 3 | 1 | 9 | 113 | **3rd** |
| 2009 | 24 Hours of Nürburgring - SP6 | Motorsport Arena Oschersleben | 1 | 0 | 0 | 0 | 0 | N/A | DNF |
| 2010 | World Touring Car Championship | BMW Team RBM | 22 | 0 | 2 | 1 | 3 | 167 | 7th |
| 2010 | 24 Hours of Le Mans - LMGT2 | BMW Motorsport | 1 | 0 | 0 | 0 | 0 | N/A | 6th |
| 2010 | 24 Hours of Nürburgring - E1-XP2 | BMW Motorsport | 1 | 1 | 1 | 1 | 1 | N/A | **1st** |
| 2011 | American Le Mans Series - GT | BMW Team RLL | 2 | 0 | 0 | 0 | 2 | 52 | 11th |
| 2011 | International V8 Supercars Championship | Garry Rogers Motorsport | 2 | 0 | 0 | 0 | 0 | 132 | 66th |
| 2011 | 24 Hours of Le Mans - GTE Pro | BMW Motorsport | 1 | 1 | 0 | 0 | 0 | N/A | DNF |
| 2011 | 24 Hours of Nürburgring - E1-XP2 | BMW Motorsport | 1 | 1 | 1 | 1 | 1 | N/A | **1st** |
| 2012 | Deutsche Tourenwagen Masters | BMW Team RBM | 10 | 1 | 2 | 0 | 3 | 69 | 7th |
| 2013 | Deutsche Tourenwagen Masters | BMW Team RBM | 10 | 3 | 1 | 1 | 5 | 116 | **2nd** |
| 2013 | 24 Hours of Nürburgring - SP9 | BMW Team Schubert | 1 | 0 | 0 | 0 | 0 | N/A | DNF |
| 2014 | Deutsche Tourenwagen Masters | BMW Team RBM | 10 | 0 | 0 | 0 | 1 | 39 | 13th |
| 2014 | Super GT - GT300 | BMW Sports Trophy Team Studie | 1 | 0 | 0 | 0 | 1 | 13 | 20th |
| 2014 | United SportsCar Championship - GTD | Turner Motorsport | 1 | 0 | 0 | 0 | 0 | 1 | 130th |
| 2014 | Blancpain Endurance Series - Pro | BMW Sports Trophy Team Marc VDS | 1 | 0 | 0 | 0 | 0 | 0 | NC |
| 2014 | Stock Car Brasil | Full Time Sports | 1 | 0 | 0 | 1 | 0 | 0 | NC† |
| 2015 | Deutsche Tourenwagen Masters | BMW Team RBM | 18 | 0 | 2 | 0 | 2 | 77 | 12th |
| 2015 | United SportsCar Championship - GTLM | BMW Team RLL | 3 | 0 | 0 | 0 | 1 | 86 | 15th |
| 2015 | Blancpain Endurance Series - Pro | BMW Sports Trophy Team Marc VDS | 1 | 0 | 0 | 0 | 0 | 14 | 18th |
| 2015 | 24 Hours of Nürburgring - SP9 | BMW Sports Trophy Team Marc VDS | 1 | 0 | 1 | 0 | 0 | N/A | 4th |
| 2016 | Deutsche Tourenwagen Masters | BMW Team MTEK | 18 | 0 | 0 | 0 | 1 | 44 | 16th |
| 2016 | IMSA SportsCar Championship - GTLM | BMW Team RLL | 2 | 0 | 0 | 0 | 0 | 50 | 22nd |
| 2016 | Super GT - GT300 | BMW Team Studie | 1 | 0 | 0 | 0 | 0 | 0 | NC |
| 2016 | 24 Hours of Nürburgring - SP9 | Schubert Motorsport | 1 | 0 | 0 | 0 | 0 | N/A | NC |
| 2017 | Deutsche Tourenwagen Masters | BMW Team RMG | 19 | 0 | 1 | 0 | 0 | 35 | 16th |
| 2017 | International GT Open - GT3 Pro | BMW Team Teo Martín | 4 | 1 | 1 | 2 | 1 | 22 | 15th |
| 2017 | IMSA SportsCar Championship - GTLM | BMW Team RLL | 1 | 0 | 0 | 0 | 0 | 23 | 26th |
| 2017 | Stock Car Brasil | HERO Motorsport | 1 | 0 | 0 | 0 | 0 | 0 | NC† |
| 2017 | Super GT - GT300 | BMW Team Studie | 1 | 0 | 0 | 0 | 0 | 0 | NC |
| 2017 | 24 Hours of Nürburgring - SP9 | BMW Team Schnitzer | 1 | 0 | 0 | 0 | 0 | N/A | 4th |
| 2017 | FIA GT World Cup | BMW Team Schnitzer | 2 | 0 | 0 | 0 | 1 | N/A | 4th |
| 2018 | Deutsche Tourenwagen Masters | BMW Team RMG | 20 | 0 | 0 | 0 | 1 | 56 | 16th |
| 2018 | IMSA SportsCar Championship - GTLM | BMW Team RLL | 1 | 0 | 0 | 0 | 0 | 24 | 22nd |
| 2018 | Stock Car Brasil | HERO Motorsport | 1 | 0 | 0 | 0 | 0 | 0 | NC† |
| 2018 | 24 Hours of Nürburgring - SP9 | BMW Team Schnitzer | 1 | 0 | 0 | 0 | 0 | N/A | 12th |
| 2018 | FIA GT World Cup | BMW Team Schnitzer | 2 | 2 | 0 | 1 | 2 | N/A | **1st** |
| 2018 | 24 Hours of Le Mans - LMGTE Pro | BMW Team MTEK | 1 | 0 | 0 | 0 | 0 | N/A | DNF |
| 2018-19 | FIA World Endurance Championship - LMGTE Pro | BMW Team MTEK | 5 | 0 | 0 | 0 | 0 | 32 | 16th |
| 2019 | 24 Hours of Le Mans - LMGTE Pro | BMW Team MTEK | 1 | 0 | 0 | 0 | 0 | N/A | 10th |
| 2019 | World Touring Car Cup | BRC Hyundai N LUKOIL Racing Team | 27 | 0 | 0 | 0 | 2 | 142 | 15th |
| 2019 | IMSA SportsCar Championship - GTLM | BMW Team RLL | 1 | 1 | 0 | 0 | 1 | 35 | 21st |
| 2019 | Blancpain GT Series Endurance Cup | BMW Team Schnitzer | 1 | 0 | 0 | 0 | 0 | 4 | 30th |
| 2019 | Intercontinental GT Challenge | BMW Team Schnitzer | 5 | 0 | 1 | 0 | 0 | 38 | 14th |
| 2019 | 24 Hours of Nürburgring - SP9 | BMW Team Schnitzer | 1 | 0 | 0 | 0 | 0 | N/A | DNF |
| 2019 | FIA GT World Cup | BMW Team Schnitzer | 2 | 0 | 0 | 0 | 0 | N/A | 4th |
| 2019-20 | FIA World Endurance Championship - LMGTE Am | Aston Martin Racing | 2 | 0 | 0 | 1 | 0 | 18 | 23rd |
| 2020 | European Le Mans Series - LMGTE | Aston Martin Racing | 1 | 0 | 0 | 0 | 1 | 0 | NC† |
| 2020 | 24 Hours of Le Mans - LMGTE Am | Aston Martin Racing | 1 | 0 | 0 | 0 | 0 | N/A | 8th |
| 2020 | ADAC GT Masters | MRS-GT Racing | 2 | 0 | 0 | 0 | 0 | 0 | NC |
| 2020 | GT World Challenge Europe Endurance Cup | Walkenhorst Motorsport | 1 | 0 | 0 | 0 | 0 | 0 | NC |
| 2020 | Intercontinental GT Challenge | Walkenhorst Motorsport | 4 | 2 | 0 | 0 | 2 | 50 | **1st** |
| 2020 | IMSA SportsCar Championship - GTLM | BMW Team RLL | 3 | 1 | 0 | 0 | 3 | 95 | 8th |
| 2020 | 24 Hours of Nürburgring - SP9 | BMW Team Schnitzer | 1 | 0 | 0 | 0 | 1 | N/A | **3rd** |
| 2021 | FIA World Endurance Championship - LMGTE Am | Aston Martin Racing | 5 | 0 | 0 | 0 | 1 | 58 | 8th |
| 2021 | IMSA SportsCar Championship - GTLM | BMW Team RLL | 5 | 1 | 0 | 0 | 5 | 1336 | 6th |
| 2021 | GT World Challenge Europe Endurance Cup | BMW M Motorsport | 1 | 0 | 0 | 0 | 0 | 0 | NC† |
| 2021 | Pure ETCR Championship | Hyundai Motorsport N | 5 | 0 | 0 | 0 | 2 | 224 | 6th |
| 2021 | 24 Hours of Nürburgring - SP9 | BMW Junior Team Shell | 1 | 0 | 0 | 0 | 0 | N/A | DNF |
| 2022 | Super GT - GT300 | BMW Team Studie x CSL | 6 | 0 | 0 | 0 | 0 | 8 | 25th |
| 2022 | IMSA SportsCar Championship - GTD Pro | BMW M Team RLL | 3 | 0 | 1 | 0 | 0 | 767 | 14th |
| 2022 | GT World Challenge Europe Endurance Cup | Rowe Racing | 5 | 0 | 0 | 0 | 0 | 34 | 12th |
| 2022 | 24 Hours of Nürburgring - SP9 | Rowe Racing | 1 | 0 | 0 | 0 | 0 | N/A | DNF |
| 2022 | Stock Car Brasil | Eurofarma RC | 1 | 0 | 0 | 0 | 1 | 0 | NC† |
| 2023 | IMSA SportsCar Championship - GTP | BMW M Team RLL | 9 | 0 | 0 | 0 | 0 | 2341 | 8th |
| 2023 | GT World Challenge Europe Endurance Cup | Team WRT | 5 | 0 | 0 | 0 | 0 | 13 | 15th |
| 2023 | Intercontinental GT Challenge | Team WRT | 4 | 0 | 0 | 0 | 1 | 39 | 12th |
| 2023 | 24 Hours of Nürburgring - SP9 | Rowe Racing | 1 | 0 | 0 | 0 | 0 | N/A | DNF |
| 2023 | FIA GT World Cup | Rowe Racing | 1 | 0 | 0 | 0 | 1 | N/A | **3rd** |
| 2024 | FIA World Endurance Championship - LMGT3 | Team WRT | 8 | 1 | 0 | 1 | 2 | 85 | 4th |
| 2024 | GT World Challenge America - Pro | Team WRT | 1 | 0 | 0 | 0 | 0 | 0 | NC† |
| 2024 | IMSA SportsCar Championship - GTP | BMW M Team RLL | 3 | 0 | 0 | 0 | 0 | 833 | 19th |
| 2024 | GT World Challenge Europe Endurance Cup | Rowe Racing | 5 | 1 | 0 | 1 | 1 | 36 | 8th |
| 2024 | Nürburgring Langstrecken-Serie - SP9 | Rowe Racing | | | | | | | |
| 2024 | Intercontinental GT Challenge | Rowe Racing | 3 | 0 | 0 | 0 | 1 | 28 | 8th |
| 2024 | 24 Hours of Nürburgring - SP9 | Rowe Racing | | | | | | | |
| 2024 | FIA GT World Cup | Team KRC | 2 | 0 | 0 | 0 | 1 | N/A | **2nd** |
| 2025 | FIA World Endurance Championship - LMGT3 | The Bend Team WRT | 8 | 0 | 0 | 0 | 2 | 49 | 10th |
| 2025 | Intercontinental GT Challenge | BMW | 5 | 2 | 0 | 0 | 3 | 87 | **3rd** |
| 2025 | IMSA SportsCar Championship - GTD Pro | Paul Miller Racing | 1 | 0 | 0 | 0 | 0 | 220 | 39th |
| 2025 | Nürburgring Langstrecken-Serie - SP9 | Rowe Racing | | | | | | | |
| 2025 | GT World Challenge Europe Endurance Cup | Rowe Racing | 5 | 1 | 0 | 0 | 2 | 60 | 4th |
| 2025 | 24 Hours of Nürburgring - SP9 | Rowe Racing | 1 | 1 | 0 | 1 | 1 | N/A | **1st** |
| 2025 | GT World Challenge Europe Sprint Cup | Paradine Competition | 2 | 0 | 0 | 0 | 0 | 0 | NC |
| 2025 | GT World Challenge Europe Sprint Cup - Bronze Cup | Paradine Competition | 2 | 0 | 0 | 0 | 1 | 19.5 | 12th |
| 2025-26 | Asian Le Mans Series - GT | UNX Racing by Team WRT | | | | | | | |
| 2025-26 | Asian Le Mans Series - GT | Team WRT | | | | | | | |
| 2025-26 | 24H Series Middle East - GT3 | Paradine Competition | | | | | | | |
| 2026 | Nürburgring Langstrecken-Serie - SP9 | Rowe Racing | | | | | | | |
| 2026 | 24 Hours of Nürburgring - SP9 | Rowe Racing | 1 | 0 | 0 | 0 | 0 | N/A | DNF |
| 2026 | GT World Challenge Europe Endurance Cup | Rowe Racing | 4 | 0 | 0 | 0 | 0 | 26 | 8th |
| 2026 | FIA World Endurance Championship - LMGT3 | Team WRT | 8 | 1 | 0 | 0 | 1 | 48 | 13th |
| 2026 | GT World Challenge Europe Sprint Cup | Paradine Competition | 8 | 0 | 0 | 0 | 0 | 0 | NC |
| 2026 | GT World Challenge Europe Sprint Cup - Bronze | Paradine Competition | 8 | 1 | 0 | 0 | 2 | 65 | 4th |
| 2026 | FIA GT World Cup | Team KRC | | | | | | | |

^{†} As Farfus was a guest driver, he was ineligible to score points.

=== Complete Euro Formula 3000 results ===
(key) (Races in bold indicate pole position; races in italics indicate fastest lap)

| Year | Entrant | 1 | 2 | 3 | 4 | 5 | 6 | 7 | 8 | 9 | DC | Points |
|---|---|---|---|---|---|---|---|---|---|---|---|---|
| 2002 | Draco Junior Team | VLL; Ret | PER; Ret | MOZ; Ret | SPA; 3 | DON; 6 | BRN; 4 | DIJ; 7 | JER; Ret | CAG; 13 | 9th | 8 |
| 2003 | Draco Junior Team | NÜR; 2 | **MAG**; 3 | **PER**; 1 | **MOZ**; 1 | **SPA**; 1 | DON; 3 | **BRN**; Ret | JER; 1 | CAG; 2 | 1st | 60 |

=== 24 Hours of Daytona results ===
| Year | Team | Co-drivers | Car | Class | Laps | Pos. | Class pos. |
|---|---|---|---|---|---|---|---|
| 2003 | (United States) JMB USA Racing | (France) Emmanuel Collard (Italy) Max Papis (Italy) Andrea Garbagnati | Ferrari 360 Modena N-GT | GT | 621 | 14th | 7th |
| 2014 | (United States) Turner Motorsport | (Canada) Paul Dalla Lana (United States) Dane Cameron (Finland) Markus Palttala | BMW Z4 GT3 | GTD | 659 | 25th | 7th |
| 2015 | (United States) BMW Team RLL | (United States) Bill Auberlen (Germany) Dirk Werner (Canada) Bruno Spengler | BMW Z4 GTLM | GTLM | 725 | 5th | **2nd** |
| 2016 | (United States) BMW Team RLL | (United States) Bill Auberlen (Germany) Dirk Werner (Canada) Bruno Spengler | BMW M6 GTLM | GTLM | 721 | 11th | 5th |
| 2017 | (United States) BMW Team RLL | (United States) Bill Auberlen (United Kingdom) Alexander Sims (Canada) Bruno Spengler | BMW M6 GTLM | GTLM | 651 | 12th | 8th |
| 2018 | (United States) BMW Team RLL | (Netherlands) Nick Catsburg (United States) John Edwards (Finland) Jesse Krohn | BMW M8 GTE | GTLM | 773 | 18th | 7th |
| 2019 | (United States) BMW Team RLL | (United States) Connor De Phillippi (Austria) Philipp Eng (United States) Colton Herta | BMW M8 GTE | GTLM | 571 | 10th | **1st** |
| 2020 | (United States) BMW Team RLL | (United States) John Edwards (Australia) Chaz Mostert (Finland) Jesse Krohn | BMW M8 GTE | GTLM | 786 | 13th | **1st** |
| 2021 | (United States) BMW Team RLL | (Germany) Marco Wittmann (United States) John Edwards (Finland) Jesse Krohn | BMW M8 GTE | GTLM | 769 | 13th | **3rd** |
| 2022 | (United States) BMW Team RLL | (United States) John Edwards (Finland) Jesse Krohn (United States) Connor De Phillippi | BMW M4 GT3 | GTD; Pro | 698 | 30th | 7th |
| 2023 | (United States) BMW M Team RLL | (Austria) Philipp Eng (United States) Colton Herta (Germany) Marco Wittmann | BMW M Hybrid V8 | GTP | 768 | 6th | 6th |
| 2024 | (United States) BMW M Team RLL | (Austria) Philipp Eng (Finland) Jesse Krohn (Belgium) Dries Vanthoor | BMW M Hybrid V8 | GTP | 776 | 8th | 8th |
| 2025 | (United States) Paul Miller Racing | (United Kingdom) Dan Harper (Germany) Max Hesse (Finland) Jesse Krohn | BMW M4 GT3 Evo | GTD Pro | 668 | 12th | 12th |

=== Complete European Touring Car Championship results ===
(key) (Races in bold indicate pole position) (Races in italics indicate fastest lap)

| Year | Team | Car | 1 | 2 | 3 | 4 | 5 | 6 | 7 | 8 | 9 | 10 | 11 | 12 | 13 | 14 | 15 | 16 | 17 | 18 | 19 | 20 | DC | Pts |
|---|---|---|---|---|---|---|---|---|---|---|---|---|---|---|---|---|---|---|---|---|---|---|---|---|
| 2004 | AutoDelta Squadra Corse | Alfa Romeo 156 | MNZ; 1; 19 | MNZ; 2; 16 | **VAL**; **1**; 3 | VAL; 2; 3 | MAG; 1; 3 | MAG; 2; 3 | HOC; 1 Ret | HOC; 2 DNS | BRN; 1; 12 | BRN; 2 Ret | DON; 1; 5 | DON; 2 Ret | SPA; 1; 8 | **SPA**; **2**; 22 | IMO; 1; 3 | IMO; 2; 11 | **OSC**; **1**; 2 | OSC; 2; 3 | DUB; 1; 4 | DUB; 2; 15 | 6th | 54 |

=== Complete World Touring Car Championship results ===
(key) (Races in bold indicate pole position) (Races in italics indicate fastest lap)

| Year | Team | Car | 1 | 2 | 3 | 4 | 5 | 6 | 7 | 8 | 9 | 10 | 11 | 12 | 13 | 14 | 15 | 16 | 17 | 18 | 19 | 20 | 21 | 22 | 23 | 24 | DC | Points |
|---|---|---|---|---|---|---|---|---|---|---|---|---|---|---|---|---|---|---|---|---|---|---|---|---|---|---|---|---|
| 2005 | Alfa Romeo Racing Team | Alfa Romeo 156 | ITA; 1; 3 | ITA; 2; 9 | FRA; 1; 8 | FRA; 2; 5 | GBR; 1; 4 | GBR; 2; 4 | SMR; 1; 5 | SMR; 2; 5 | MEX; 1; 9 | MEX; 2; 10 | **BEL**; **1** DSQ | BEL; 2; 4 | GER; 1; 9 | GER; 2; 5 | TUR; 1; 8 | TUR; 2; 2 | ESP; 1 NC | ESP; 2; 7 | MAC; 1; 1 | MAC; 2; 3 | | | | | 4th | 65 |
| 2006 | N.Technology | Alfa Romeo 156 | ITA; 1; 8 | ITA; 2; 1 | FRA; 1; 21 | FRA; 2; 12 | GBR; 1; 22 | GBR; 2; 11 | GER; 1; 6 | GER; 2; 2 | **BRA**; **1**; 3 | BRA; 2 Ret | MEX; 1; 2 | MEX; 2; 1 | CZE; 1 Ret | CZE; 2; 15 | TUR; 1; 9 | TUR; 2; 20 | **ESP**; **1**; 1 | ESP; 2; 5 | MAC; 1; 5 | MAC; 2 Ret | | | | | **3rd** | **64** |
| 2007 | BMW Team Germany | BMW 320si | BRA; 1; 3 | BRA; 2; 1 | NED; 1; 5 | NED; 2; 2 | ESP; 1; 22 | ESP; 2; 10 | FRA; 1; 7 | FRA; 2; 1 | CZE; 1; 4 | CZE; 2; 2 | POR; 1; 9 | POR; 2; 6 | SWE; 1; 16 | SWE; 2; 9 | GER; 1; 7 | GER; 2; 1 | GBR; 1; 11 | GBR; 2 Ret | ITA; 1; 7 | ITA; 2 Ret | MAC; 1; 26 | MAC; 2 DNS | | | 4th | 71 |
| 2008 | BMW Team Germany | BMW 320si | BRA; 1 DSQ | BRA; 2; 6 | MEX; 1; 11 | MEX; 2; 10 | ESP; 1 Ret | ESP; 2; 20 | **FRA**; **1**; 1 | FRA; 2; 6 | CZE; 1; 4 | CZE; 2; 3 | POR; 1 Ret | POR; 2; 10 | **GBR**; **1** Ret | GBR; 2; 6 | GER; 1; 1 | GER; 2; 6 | EUR; 1; 7 | EUR; 2; 8 | ITA; 1 Ret | ITA; 2; 8 | **JPN**; **1**; 6 | JPN; 2; 2 | MAC; 1; 4 | MAC; 2; 11 | 6th | 63 |
| 2009 | BMW Team Germany | BMW 320si | BRA; 1; 5 | BRA; 2; 6 | **MEX**; **1**; 2 | MEX; 2; 4 | MAR; 1; 12 | MAR; 2; 6 | **FRA**; **1**; 2 | FRA; 2; 2 | ESP; 1; 4 | ESP; 2; 1 | **CZE**; **1** Ret | CZE; 2 Ret | POR; 1; 8 | **POR**; **2**; 1 | GBR; 1; 8 | **GBR**; **2**; 1 | GER; 1; 5 | GER; 2; 1 | ITA; 1 NC | ITA; 2; 8 | JPN; 1; 8 | **JPN**; **2**; 1 | MAC; 1; 8 | **MAC**; **2**; 1 | **3rd** | **113** |
| 2010 | BMW Team RBM | BMW 320si | BRA; 1; 6 | BRA; 2; 6 | MAR; 1; 10 | MAR; 2 Ret | **ITA**; **1**; 2 | ITA; 2; 4 | BEL; 1; 9 | BEL; 2; 8 | POR; 1; 4 | POR; 2; 5 | GBR; 1; 6 | GBR; 2; 8 | CZE; 1; 4 | CZE; 2; 5 | **GER**; **1**; 2 | GER; 2; 2 | ESP; 1; 18 | ESP; 2; 8 | JPN; 1 DSQ | JPN; 2 DSQ | MAC; 1; 6 | MAC; 2; 5 | | | 7th | 167 |

=== Complete 24 Hours of Le Mans results ===
| Year | Team | Co-drivers | Car | Class | Laps | Pos. | Class pos. |
|---|---|---|---|---|---|---|---|
| 2010 | (Germany) BMW Motorsport | (Germany) Jörg Müller (Germany) Uwe Alzen | BMW M3 GT2 | GT2 | 320 | 19th | 6th |
| 2011 | (Germany) BMW Motorsport | (Germany) Jörg Müller (Germany) Dirk Werner | BMW M3 GT2 | GTE; Pro | 276 | DNF | DNF |
| 2018 | (Germany) BMW Team MTEK | (Portugal) António Félix da Costa (United Kingdom) Alexander Sims | BMW M8 GTE | GTE; Pro | 223 | DNF | DNF |
| 2019 | (Germany) BMW Team MTEK | (Portugal) António Félix da Costa (Finland) Jesse Krohn | BMW M8 GTE | GTE; Pro | 335 | 30th | 10th |
| 2020 | (United Kingdom) Aston Martin Racing | (Canada) Paul Dalla Lana (United Kingdom) Ross Gunn | Aston Martin Vantage AMR | GTE; Am | 333 | 33rd | 8th |
| 2024 | (Belgium) Team WRT | (Indonesia) Sean Gelael (United Kingdom) Darren Leung | BMW M4 GT3 | LMGT3 | 280 | 28th | **2nd** |
| 2025 | (Belgium) The Bend Team WRT | Timur Boguslavskiy (Australia) Yasser Shahin | BMW M4 GT3 Evo | LMGT3 | 168 | DNF | DNF |
| 2026 | (Belgium) Team WRT | (Indonesia) Sean Gelael (United Kingdom) Darren Leung | BMW M4 GT3 Evo | LMGT3 | 334 | 39th | 7th |

=== Complete Deutsche Tourenwagen Masters results ===
(key) (Races in bold indicate pole position) (Races in italics indicate fastest lap)

| Year | Team | Car | 1 | 2 | 3 | 4 | 5 | 6 | 7 | 8 | 9 | 10 | 11 | 12 | 13 | 14 | 15 | 16 | 17 | 18 | 19 | 20 | Pos | Points |
|---|---|---|---|---|---|---|---|---|---|---|---|---|---|---|---|---|---|---|---|---|---|---|---|---|
| 2012 | BMW Team RBM | BMW M3 DTM | HOC; 15 | LAU; 3 | BRH; 11 | SPL; 10 | NOR; Ret | NÜR; 10 | ZAN; 9 | OSC; 5 | **VAL**; 1 | **HOC**; 3 | | | | | | | | | | | 7th | 69 |
| 2013 | BMW Team RBM | BMW M3 DTM | HOC; 1 | BRH; Ret | SPL; 6 | LAU; 12 | NOR; 16 | MSC; 3 | **NÜR**; 2 | OSC; 1 | ZAN; 1 | HOC; 11 | | | | | | | | | | | 2nd | 116 |
| 2014 | BMW Team RBM | BMW M4 DTM | HOC; 8 | OSC; 5 | HUN; 21† | NOR; 14 | MSC; 10 | SPL; 2 | NÜR; Ret | LAU; 7 | ZAN; Ret | HOC; 16 | | | | | | | | | | | 13th | 39 |
| 2015 | BMW Team RBM | BMW M4 DTM | HOC; 1; 10 | HOC; 2; 21 | LAU; 1 Ret | LAU; 2 Ret | NOR; 1; 8 | NOR; 2 Ret | **ZAN**; **1**; 4 | ZAN; 2; 2 | SPL; 1; 6 | SPL; 2; 18 | MSC; 1; 15 | MSC; 2; 11 | OSC; 1; 4 | **OSC**; **2**; 2 | NÜR; 1; 18 | NÜR; 2; 8 | HOC; 1 Ret | HOC; 2; 14 | | | 12th | 77 |
| 2016 | BMW Team MTEK | BMW M4 DTM | HOC; 1; 14 | HOC; 2; 2 | SPL; 1; 9 | SPL; 2; 4 | LAU; 1; 21 | LAU; 2 Ret | NOR; 1; 11 | NOR; 2 Ret | ZAN; 1 Ret | ZAN; 2; 13 | MSC; 1; 14 | MSC; 2; 4 | NÜR; 1; 22 | NÜR; 2; 21 | HUN; 1; 19 | HUN; 2 Ret | HOC; 1; 11 | HOC; 2 Ret | | | 16th | 44 |
| 2017 | BMW Team RMG | BMW M4 DTM | HOC; 1; 13 | HOC; 2 Ret | LAU; 1; 12 | LAU; 2; 14 | HUN; 1; 11 | HUN; 2; 12 | NOR; 1 Ret | NOR; 2; 7 | MSC; 1; 17 | MSC; 2; 11 | ZAN; 1; 6 | **ZAN**; **2**; 8 | NÜR; 1; 8 | NÜR; 2; 9 | SPL; 1 DNS | SPL; 2; 12 | HOC; 1; 17 | HOC; 2; 7 | | | 16th | 35 |
| 2018 | BMW Team RMG | BMW M4 DTM | HOC; 1; 15 | HOC; 2; 10 | LAU; 1; 10 | LAU; 2; 16 | HUN; 1; 15 | HUN; 2; 7 | NOR; 1; 14 | NOR; 2; 17 | ZAN; 1; 8 | ZAN; 2; 5 | BRH; 1; 2 | BRH; 2 Ret | MIS; 1; 11 | MIS; 2 Ret | NÜR; 1; 9 | NÜR; 2; 7 | SPL; 1; 9 | SPL; 2 Ret | HOC; 1 Ret | HOC; 2; 7 | 16th | 56 |

^{†} Driver retired, but was classified as they completed 75% of the winner's race distance.

=== Complete IMSA SportsCar Championship results ===
(key) (Races in bold indicate pole position) (Races in italics indicate fastest lap)

| Year | Team | Class | Car | Engine | 1 | 2 | 3 | 4 | 5 | 6 | 7 | 8 | 9 | 10 | 11 | Rank | Points | Ref |
|---|---|---|---|---|---|---|---|---|---|---|---|---|---|---|---|---|---|---|
| 2014 | Turner Motorsport | GTD | BMW Z4 GT3 | BMW 4.4 L V8 | DAY; 7† | SEB | LGA | DET | WGL | MOS | IMS | ELK | VIR | COA | PET | 130th | 1 | |
| 2015 | BMW Team RLL | GTLM | BMW Z4 GTE | BMW 4.4 L V8 | DAY; 2 | SEB; 8 | LBH | LGA | WGL | MOS | ELK | VIR | COA | PET; 4 | | 15th | 86 | |
| 2016 | BMW Team RLL | GTLM | BMW M6 GTLM | BMW 4.4 L V8 | DAY; 5 | SEB | LBH | LGA | WGL | MOS | LIM | ELK | VIR | COA | PET; 9 | 22nd | 50 | |
| 2017 | BMW Team RLL | GTLM | BMW M6 GTLM | BMW 4.4 L Turbo V8 | DAY; 8 | SEB | LBH | COA | WGL | MOS | LIM | ELK | VIR | LGA | PET | 26th | 23 | |
| 2018 | BMW Team RLL | GTLM | BMW M8 GTE | BMW S63 4.0 L Twin-turbo V8 | DAY; 7 | SEB | LBH | MDO | WGL | MOS | LIM | ELK | VIR | LGA | PET | 22nd | 24 | |
| 2019 | BMW Team RLL | GTLM | BMW M8 GTE | BMW S63 4.0 L Twin-turbo V8 | DAY; 1 | SEB | LBH | MDO | WGL | MOS | LIM | ELK | VIR | LGA | PET | 21st | 35 | |
| 2020 | BMW Team RLL | GTLM | BMW M8 GTE | BMW S63 4.0 L Twin-turbo V8 | DAY; 1 | DAY | SEB | ELK | VIR | ATL | MDO | CLT | PET; 3 | LGA | SEB; 3 | 7th | 95 | |
| 2021 | BMW Team RLL | GTLM | BMW M8 GTE | BMW S63 4.0 L Turbo V8 | DAY; 3 | SEB; 3 | DET | WGL; 2 | WGL | LIM | ELK | LGA | LBH | VIR | **PET**; 3 | 6th | 1336 | |
| 2022 | BMW M Team RLL | GTD Pro | BMW M4 GT3 | BMW S58B30T0 3.0 L Twin Turbo I6 | DAY; 7 | SEB; 10 | LBH | LGA | **WGL**; 7 | MOS | LIM | ELK | VIR | PET | | 14th | 767 | |
| 2023 | BMW M Team RLL | GTP | BMW M Hybrid V8 | BMW P66/3 4.0 L Turbo V8 | DAY; 6 | SEB; 8 | LBH; 4 | LGA; 5 | WGL; 8 | MOS; 8 | ELK; 9 | IMS; 10 | PET; 8 | | | 8th | 2341 | |
| 2024 | BMW M Team RLL | GTP | BMW M Hybrid V8 | BMW P66/3 4.0 L Turbo V8 | DAY; 8 | SEB; 6 | LBH | LGA | DET | WGL | ELK | IMS | PET; 4 | | | 19th | 833 | |
| 2025 | Paul Miller Racing | GTD Pro | BMW M4 GT3 Evo | BMW P58 3.0 L Twin Turbo I6 | DAY; 12 | SEB | LGA | DET | WGL | MOS | ELK | VIR | IMS | PET | | 39th | 220 | |

^{†} Farfus did not complete sufficient laps in order to score full points.

=== Complete Super GT results ===
(key) (Races in bold indicate pole position) (Races in italics indicate fastest lap)

| Year | Team | Car | Class | 1 | 2 | 3 | 4 | 5 | 6 | 7 | 8 | DC | Points |
|---|---|---|---|---|---|---|---|---|---|---|---|---|---|
| 2014 | BMW Sports Trophy Team Studie | BMW Z4 GT3 | GT300 | OKA | FUJ | AUT | SUG | FUJ | SUZ; 3 | BUR | MOT | 20th | 13 |
| 2016 | BMW Team Studie | BMW M6 GT3 | GT300 | OKA | FUJ | SUG | FUJ | SUZ; DNS | CHA | MOT | MOT | NC | 0 |
| 2017 | BMW Team Studie | BMW M6 GT3 | GT300 | OKA | FUJ | AUT | SUG | FUJ | SUZ; 11 | CHA | MOT | NC | 0 |
| 2022 | BMW Team Studie × CSL | BMW M4 GT3 | GT300 | OKA; Ret | FUJ; Ret | SUZ | FUJ; 21 | SUZ; 12 | SUG; 5 | AUT | MOT; 9 | 25th | 8 |

=== Complete GT World Challenge Europe results ===
==== GT World Challenge Europe Endurance Cup ====
(key) (Races in bold indicate pole position) (Races in italics indicate fastest lap)

| Year | Team | Car | Class | 1 | 2 | 3 | 4 | 5 | 6 | 7 | Pos. | Points |
|---|---|---|---|---|---|---|---|---|---|---|---|---|
| 2014 | BMW Sports Trophy Team Marc VDS | BMW Z4 GT3 | Pro | MNZ | SIL | LEC | SPA; 6H; 47 | SPA; 12H; Ret | SPA; 24H; Ret | NÜR | NC | 0 |
| 2015 | BMW Sports Trophy Team Marc VDS | BMW Z4 GT3 | Pro | MNZ | SIL | LEC | SPA; 6H; 3 | SPA; 12H; 3 | SPA; 24H; 31 | NÜR | 18th | 14 |
| 2019 | BMW Team Schnitzer | BMW M6 GT3 | Pro | MNZ | SIL | LEC | SPA; 6H; 6 | SPA; 12H; 13 | SPA; 24H; Ret | CAT | 30th | 4 |
| 2020 | Walkenhorst Motorsport | BMW M6 GT3 | Pro | IMO | NÜR | SPA; 6H; 50 | SPA; 12H; 53 | SPA; 24H; Ret | LEC | | NC | 0 |
| 2021 | BMW M Motorsport | BMW M4 GT3 | INV | MNZ | LEC | SPA; 6H | SPA; 12H | SPA; 24H | NUR | CAT; 16 | NC | 0 |
| 2022 | Rowe Racing | BMW M4 GT3 | Pro | IMO; 11 | LEC; 11 | SPA; 6H; 1 | SPA; 12H; 1 | SPA; 24H; 6 | HOC; 11 | CAT; 9 | 12th | 34 |
| 2023 | Team WRT | BMW M4 GT3 | Pro | MNZ; Ret | LEC; 8 | SPA; 6H; 13 | SPA; 12H; 9 | SPA; 24H; 6 | NÜR; 49† | CAT; Ret | 15th | 13 |
| 2024 | Rowe Racing | BMW M4 GT3 | Pro | LEC; 1 | SPA; 6H; 7 | SPA; 12H; 17 | SPA; 24H; 6 | NÜR; 11 | MNZ; 27 | JED; Ret | 8th | 36 |
| 2025 | Rowe Racing | BMW M4 GT3 Evo | Pro | LEC; 7 | MNZ; Ret | SPA; 6H; 8 | SPA; 12H; 8 | SPA; 24H; 5 | NÜR; 1 | CAT; 3 | 4th | 60 |
| 2026 | Rowe Racing | BMW M4 GT3 Evo | Pro | LEC; 6 | MNZ; 5 | SPA; 6H; 5 | SPA; 12H; 21 | SPA; 24H; 9 | NÜR; 17 | ALG | 8th | 26 |

==== GT World Challenge Europe Sprint Cup ====
(key) (Races in bold indicate pole position) (Races in italics indicate fastest lap)

| Year | Team | Car | Class | 1 | 2 | 3 | 4 | 5 | 6 | 7 | 8 | 9 | 10 | Pos. | Points |
|---|---|---|---|---|---|---|---|---|---|---|---|---|---|---|---|
| 2025 | Paradine Competition | BMW M4 GT3 Evo | Bronze | BRH; 1 | BRH; 2 | ZAN; 1; 19 | ZAN; 2; 31 | MIS; 1 | MIS; 2 | MAG; 1 | MAG; 2 | VAL; 1 | VAL; 2 | 12th | 19.5 |
| 2026 | Paradine Competition | BMW M4 GT3 Evo | Bronze | BRH; 1 | BRH; 2 | MIS; 1; 25 | MIS; 2; 38 | MAG; 1; 31 | MAG; 2; 23 | ZAN; 1; 18 | ZAN; 2; 35 | CAT; 1; 20 | CAT; 2; 29 | 4th | 65 |

=== Complete FIA World Endurance Championship results ===
(key) (Races in bold indicate pole position; races in italics indicate fastest lap)

| Year | Entrant | Class | Chassis | Engine | 1 | 2 | 3 | 4 | 5 | 6 | 7 | 8 | Rank | Points |
|---|---|---|---|---|---|---|---|---|---|---|---|---|---|---|
| 2018–19 | BMW Team MTEK | LMGTE Pro | BMW M8 GTE | BMW S63 4.0 L Turbo V8 | SPA | LMS; Ret | SIL; Ret | FUJ | SHA | SEB; 7 | SPA; 4 | LMS; 6 | 16th | 32 |
| 2019–20 | Aston Martin Racing | LMGTE Am | Aston Martin Vantage AMR | Aston Martin 4.0 L Turbo V8 | SIL | FUJ | SHA | BHR | COA | SPA; 9 | LMS; 6 | BHR | 23rd | 18 |
| 2021 | Aston Martin Racing | LMGTE Am | Aston Martin Vantage AMR | Aston Martin 4.0 L Turbo V8 | SPA; 6 | ALG; 4 | MNZ; 2 | LMS | BHR; 4 | BHR; 10 | | | 8th | 58 |
| 2024 | Team WRT | LMGT3 | BMW M4 GT3 | BMW P58 3.0 L I6 t | QAT; 6 | IMO; 1 | SPA; Ret | LMS; 2 | SÃO; 10 | COA; 5 | FUJ; 10 | BHR; 13 | 4th | 85 |
| 2025 | The Bend Team WRT | LMGT3 | BMW M4 GT3 Evo | BMW P58 3.0 L I6 t | QAT; 3 | IMO; 12 | SPA; Ret | LMS; Ret | SÃO; 12 | COA; 9 | FUJ; 3 | BHR; 7 | 10th | 49 |
| 2026 | Team WRT | LMGT3 | BMW M4 GT3 Evo | BMW P58 3.0 L I6 t | IMO; 5 | SPA; 14 | LMS; 7 | SÃO; 12 | COA; 16 | FUJ; 1 | CAT; 10 | MNZ; Ret | 13th | 48 |

=== Complete World Touring Car Cup results ===
(key) (Races in bold indicate pole position) (Races in italics indicate fastest lap)

| Year | Team | Car | 1 | 2 | 3 | 4 | 5 | 6 | 7 | 8 | 9 | 10 | 11 | 12 | 13 | 14 | 15 | 16 | 17 | 18 | 19 | 20 | 21 | 22 | 23 | 24 | 25 | 26 | 27 | 28 | 29 | 30 | DC | Pts |
|---|---|---|---|---|---|---|---|---|---|---|---|---|---|---|---|---|---|---|---|---|---|---|---|---|---|---|---|---|---|---|---|---|---|---|
| 2019 | BRC Hyundai N LUKOIL Racing Team | Hyundai i30 N TCR | MAR; 1; 13 | MAR; 2; 11 | MAR; 3 Ret | HUN; 1; 9 | HUN; 2; 9 | HUN; 3; 8 | SVK; 1; 5 | SVK; 2; 21 | SVK; 3; 7 | NED; 1 Ret | NED; 2; 6 | NED; 3; 4 | GER; 1; 8 | GER; 2; 3 | GER; 3 Ret | POR; 1; 3 | POR; 2 Ret | POR; 3 Ret | CHN; 1; 7 | CHN; 2 Ret | CHN; 3; 4 | JPN; 1; 15 | JPN; 2; 21 | JPN; 3; 22 | MAC; 1 | MAC; 2 | MAC; 3 | MAL; 1; 28 | MAL; 2; 19 | MAL; 3 Ret | 15th | 142 |

=== Complete European Le Mans Series results ===
(key) (Races in bold indicate pole position; results in italics indicate fastest lap)

| Year | Entrant | Class | Chassis | Engine | 1 | 2 | 3 | 4 | 5 | Rank | Points |
|---|---|---|---|---|---|---|---|---|---|---|---|
| 2020 | Aston Martin Racing | LMGTE | Aston Martin Vantage AMR | Aston Martin 4.0 L Turbo V8 | LEC | SPA; 3 | LEC | MNZ | ALG | NC† | 0† |

^{†} As Farfus was a guest driver, he was ineligible for points.

Sporting positions
| Preceded by Felipe Massa | Formula Renault 2000 Eurocup; Champion; 2001 | Succeeded by Eric Salignon |
| Preceded by Jaime Melo | Euro Formula 3000; Champion; 2003 | Succeeded by Nicky Pastorelli |
| Preceded by Edoardo Mortara | FIA GT World Cup; Winner; 2018 | Succeeded by Raffaele Marciello |
| Preceded by Dennis Olsen | Intercontinental GT Challenge; Champion; 2020; With: Nicky Catsburg | Succeeded by Côme Ledogar; Alessandro Pier Guidi |
