= Jaime Melo =

Brazilian professional racing driver

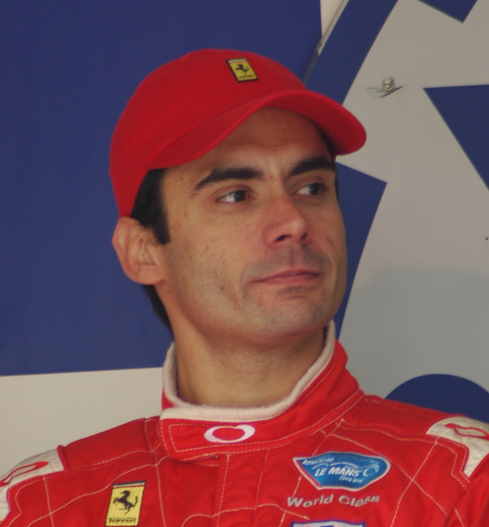
- Melo at the 2009 24 Hours of Le Mans.
- Nationality: (Brazil) Brazilian
- Born: 24 April 1980 (age 46) Cascavel, Brazil
- Categorisation: FIA Platinum

24 Hours of Le Mans career
- Years: 2004, 2007 – 2012
- Teams: JMB Racing, Risi Competizione, Luxury Racing
- Best finish: 18th (2009, 2012)
- Class wins: 2 (2008, 2009)

Jaime Melo Jr. (born 24 April 1980) is a Brazilian professional racing driver, best known for his success in grand tourers as a Ferrari driver. In 2006, he won the FIA GT Championship in the GT2 class driving for AF Corse, and the following year, he did the same in the American Le Mans Series for Risi Competizione. Melo has collected GT2 class wins at the 2008 and 2009 24 Hours of Le Mans; the 2009 24 Hours of Spa; the 2011 24 Hours of Nürburgring; the 2007, 2009, and 2010 12 Hours of Sebring; and the 2008 and 2009 Petit Le Mans, among other endurance race wins.

For 2012, Melo competed in the FIA World Endurance Championship, driving for Luxury Racing in GTE Pro.

In April 2013, Melo was arrested for reckless driving near his hometown of Cascavel after leading police on a car chase while under the influence. In November 2017, he was arrested again for driving with a suspended license, refusing to take a breathalyzer test and attempting to flee.

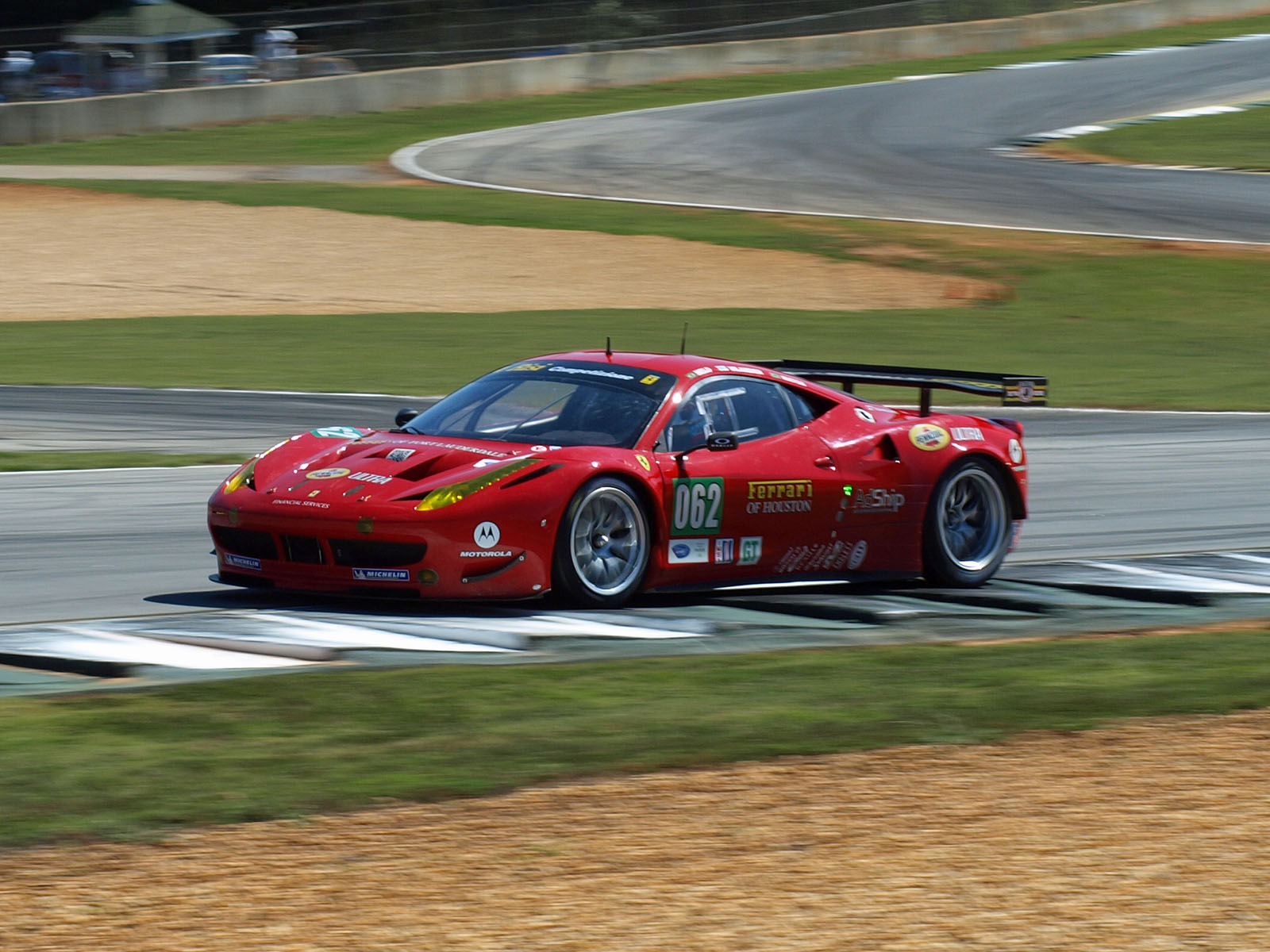
Melo driving the Risi Competizione Ferrari 458 in qualifying for the 2011 Petit Le Mans at Road Atlanta.

== Racing record ==
=== Complete International Formula 3000 results ===
(key)

Year	Entrant	1	2	3	4	5	6	7	8	9	10	11	12	DC	Points
2000	Petrobras Junior Team	IMO; 4	SIL; 16	CAT; 14	NÜR; 6	MON; DNQ	MAG; 17	A1R; 5	HOC; 8	HUN; DNQ	SPA; 18			14th	6
2001	Durango Formula	**INT**; 2	IMO; Ret	CAT; 21	A1R; 5	MON; 11	NÜR; 13	MAG; 14	SIL; 12	HOC; 12	HUN	SPA	MNZ	12th	8

=== Complete Euro Formula 3000 results ===
(key) (Races in bold indicate pole position; races in italics indicate fastest lap)

Year	Entrant	1	2	3	4	5	6	7	8	9	DC	Points
2002	Great Wall Racing Team	VLL; 11	PER; 4	MOZ; 9	SPA; 2	DON; 3	BRN; 1	**DIJ**; 1	**JER**; 1	CAG; 2	**1st**	**49**
2003	Uboldi Corse	NÜR	MAG	PER	MOZ	SPA; 5	DON	BRN			6th	14
2003	ADM Motorsport								JER; 5	**CAG**; 1	6th	14

=== 24 Hours of Le Mans results ===
Year	Team	Co-Drivers	Car	Class	Laps	Pos.	Class Pos.
2004	(France) JMB Racing	(France) Jean-René de Fornoux (France) Stéphane Daoudi	Ferrari 360 Modena GTC	GT	133	DNF	DNF
2007	(United States) Risi Competizione	(Finland) Mika Salo (United Kingdom) Johnny Mowlem	Ferrari F430 GT2	GT2	223	DNF	DNF
2008	(United States) Risi Competizione	(Italy) Gianmaria Bruni (Finland) Mika Salo	Ferrari F430 GT2	GT2	326	19th	**1st**
2009	(United States) Risi Competizione	(Germany) Pierre Kaffer (Finland) Mika Salo	Ferrari F430 GT2	GT2	329	18th	**1st**
2010	(United States) Risi Competizione	(Italy) Gianmaria Bruni (Germany) Pierre Kaffer	Ferrari F430 GT2	GT2	116	DNF	DNF
2011	(France) Luxury Racing	(Monaco) Stéphane Ortelli (France) Frédéric Makowiecki	Ferrari 458 Italia GTC	GTE; Pro	183	DNF	DNF
2012	(France) Luxury Racing	(France) Frédéric Makowiecki (Germany) Dominik Farnbacher	Ferrari 458 Italia GTC	GTE; Pro	333	18th	**2nd**

Sporting positions
Preceded by Felipe Massa	Euro Formula 3000 champion 2002	Succeeded by Augusto Farfus
