= 2003 Euro Formula 3000 Series =

Automobile race

The 2003 Euro Formula 3000 Series was scheduled over 10 rounds and contested over 9 rounds. 10 different teams, 26 different drivers competed. All teams raced with Lola B99/50 chassis with Zytek engines.

The scoring system was 10-6-4-3-2-1 points awarded to the first six finishers.

== Driver and team lineup ==
Team	No.	Driver	Rounds
(Italy) Traini Corse	1	(Italy) Matteo Grassotto	All
(Italy) Traini Corse	2	(United Kingdom) Colin Brown	1-6
(Italy) Traini Corse	2	(Italy) Matteo Cressoni	7
(Italy) Traini Corse	2	(Spain) Nicolas Dalli	8
(Italy) Traini Corse	2	(Italy) Leonardo Orecchioni	9
(United Kingdom) John Village Automotive	3	(United States) Peter Boss	All
(United Kingdom) John Village Automotive	4	(United States) Joel Nelson	All
(Italy) GP Racing	5	(Russia) Roman Rusinov	1-7
(Italy) GP Racing	5	(Belgium) Maxime Hodencq	8-9
(Italy) GP Racing	6	(Italy) Fabrizio del Monte	All
(Italy) Draco Junior Team	7	(Germany) Sven Heidfeld	All
(Italy) Draco Junior Team	8	(Brazil) Augusto Farfus	All
(Spain) B & C Competition	11	(France) Massimo Carli	2
(Spain) B & C Competition	12	(Argentina) Paolo Leonardo Biglieri	2
(Italy) Euronova Racing	14	(Austria) Norbert Siedler	9
(Italy) Euronova Racing	15	(Russia) Vitaly Petrov	9
(Italy) ADM Motorsport	16	(Italy) Gianmaria Bruni	1-7
(Italy) ADM Motorsport	16	(Brazil) Jaime Melo	8-9
(Italy) ADM Motorsport	17	(Brazil) Rafael Sperafico	1-7
(Italy) ADM Motorsport	17	(Italy) Mauro Contu	9
(Italy) Scuderia Famà	18	(Italy) "Babalus"	1-4
(Italy) Scuderia Famà	18	(France) Jean de Pourtales	5-9
(Italy) Scuderia Famà	19	(Netherlands) Nicky Pastorelli	All
(Italy) Energy Racing	23	(Serbia and Montenegro) Miloš Pavlović	1-2
(Italy) Uboldi Corse	34	(Italy) Gabriele Lancieri	4
(Italy) Uboldi Corse	34	(Brazil) Jaime Melo	5
(Italy) Uboldi Corse	34	(Italy) Giacomo Vargiu	9

== Race calendar ==
The season was scheduled to start at Autódromo do Estoril on 27 April, but the round was cancelled by promoter.

Round	Circuit/Location	Date	Laps	Distance	Time	Speed
1	(Germany) Nürburgring	4 May	30	5.148=154.44 km	0'56:20.557	164.465 km/h
2	(France) Circuit de Nevers Magny-Cours	11 May	35	4.25=148.75 km	0'52:45.207	169.183 km/h
3	(Italy) Autodromo di Pergusa	25 May	31	4.950=153.45 km	0'48:37.392	189.354 km/h
4	(Italy) Autodromo Nazionale Monza	29 June	25	5.770=144.25 km	0'42:45.086	202.449 km/h
5	(Belgium) Circuit de Spa-Francorchamps	20 July	19	6.968=132.392 km	0´46:20.006	? km/h
6	(United Kingdom) Donington Park	10 August	38	4.023=152.874 km	1'05:21.400	140.344 km/h
7	(Czech Republic) Masaryk Circuit, Brno	21 September	27	5.403=145.881 km	0'51:04.514	? km/h
8	(Spain) Circuito Permanente de Jerez	12 October	34	4.428=150.552 km	0'56:27.791	159.982 km/h
9	(Italy) Circuito di Cagliari	2 November	60	2.414=144.84 km	1'09:14.803	125.499 km/h

== Results ==
Round	Circuit	Pole position	Fastest lap	Winner	Winning team
1	(Germany) Nürburgring	(Russia) Roman Rusinov	(Brazil) Augusto Farfus	(Italy) Gianmaria Bruni	(Italy) ADM Motorsport
2	(France) Circuit de Nevers Magny-Cours	(Brazil) Augusto Farfus	(Italy) Gianmaria Bruni	(Italy) Gianmaria Bruni	(Italy) ADM Motorsport
3	(Italy) Autodromo di Pergusa	(Brazil) Augusto Farfus	(Brazil) Augusto Farfus	(Brazil) Augusto Farfus	(Italy) Draco Junior Team
4	(Italy) Autodromo Nazionale Monza	(Brazil) Augusto Farfus	(Italy) Fabrizio del Monte	(Brazil) Augusto Farfus	(Italy) Draco Junior Team
5	(Belgium) Circuit de Spa-Francorchamps	(Brazil) Augusto Farfus	unknown	(Brazil) Augusto Farfus	(Italy) Draco Junior Team
6	(United Kingdom) Donington Park	(Italy) Gianmaria Bruni	(Germany) Sven Heidfeld	(Italy) Gianmaria Bruni	(Italy) ADM Motorsport
7	(Czech Republic) Masaryk Circuit, Brno	(Brazil) Augusto Farfus	(Italy) Fabrizio del Monte	(Italy) Fabrizio del Monte	(Italy) GP Racing
8	(Spain) Circuito Permanente de Jerez	(United States) Joel Nelson	(Brazil) Augusto Farfus	(Brazil) Augusto Farfus	(Italy) Draco Junior Team
9	(Italy) Circuito di Cagliari	(Brazil) Jaime Melo	(Brazil) Jaime Melo	(Brazil) Jaime Melo	(Italy) ADM Motorsport

== Championships standings ==
Pos	Driver	NÜR (Germany)	MAG (France)	PER (Italy)	MNZ (Italy)	SPA (Belgium)	DON (United Kingdom)	BRN (Czech Republic)	JER (Spain)	CAG (Italy)	Pts
1	(Brazil) Augusto Farfus	2	3	1	1	1	3	Ret	1	2	60
2	(Italy) Fabrizio del Monte	Ret	9	6	3	3	4	1	2	4	31
3	(Italy) Gianmaria Bruni	1	1	Ret	Ret	9	1	Ret			30
4	(Italy) Matteo Grassotto	3	2	4	2	Ret	10†	3	Ret	12†	23
5	(Netherlands) Nicky Pastorelli	8	5	2	7	7	2	DNS	4	5	19
6	(Brazil) Jaime Melo					5			5	1	14
7	(United States) Peter Boss	5	10	3	4	4	Ret	8	Ret	8	12
8	(United States) Joel Nelson	10	Ret	Ret	Ret	2	7	2	7	Ret	12
9	(Russia) Roman Rusinov	6	4	Ret	Ret	Ret	5	DNS			6
10	(Italy) "Babalus"	4	7	5	Ret						5
11	(United Kingdom) Colin Brown	DNS	6	Ret	6	6	6				4
12	(Germany) Sven Heidfeld	Ret	8	7	Ret	Ret	8	7	3	11†	4
13	(Austria) Norbert Siedler									3	4
14	(Italy) Matteo Cressoni							4			3
15	(Italy) Gabriele Lancieri				5						2
16	(Brazil) Rafael Sperafico	9	12	Ret	Ret	Ret	9	5			2
17	(France) Jean de Pourtales					8	Ret	6	Ret	6	1
18	(Spain) Nicolas Dalli								6		1
-	(Serbia and Montenegro) Milos Pavlovic	7	11								0
-	(Italy) Giacomo Vargiu									7	0
-	(Italy) Mauro Contu									9	0
-	(Russia) Vitaly Petrov									10	0
-	(Italy) Massimo Carli		13								0
-	(Belgium) Maxime Hodencq								Ret	Ret	0
-	(Italy) Leonardo Orecchioni									Ret	0
-	(Argentina) Paolo Leonardo Biglieri		DNQ								0
Pos	Driver	NÜR (Germany)	MAG (France)	PER (Italy)	MNZ (Italy)	SPA (Belgium)	DON (United Kingdom)	BRN (Czech Republic)	JER (Spain)	CAG (Italy)	Pts

Colour	Result
Gold	Winner
Silver	Second place
Bronze	Third place
Green	Points classification
Blue	Non-points classification
Blue	Non-classified finish (NC)
Purple	Retired, not classified (Ret)
Red	Did not qualify (DNQ)
Red	Did not pre-qualify (DNPQ)
Black	Disqualified (DSQ)
White	Did not start (DNS)
White	Withdrew (WD)
White	Race cancelled (C)
Blank	Did not practice (DNP)
Blank	Did not arrive (DNA)
Blank	Excluded (EX)

- † — Drivers did not finish the race, but were classified as they completed over 90% of the race distance.

== See also ==
- 2003 International Formula 3000 season
