= Circuito di Cagliari =

Circuit

Circuito Cittadino di Cagliari
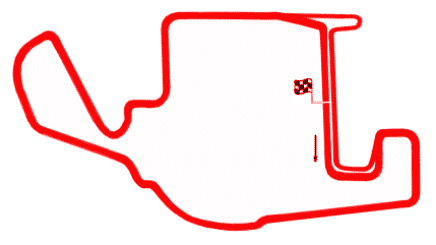
- Street Circuit (2002–2003)
- Location: Cagliari, Italy
- Coordinates: 39°11′57″N 9°8′6″E
- Opened: 10 November 2002; 23 years ago
- Closed: 2 November 2003; 22 years ago
- Major events: Euro Formula 3000 (2002–2003); Sardinia F3 Masters (2003)

Street Circuit (2002–2003)
- Length: 2.414 km (1.500 mi)
- Turns: 18
- Race lap record: 1:08.045 ( (Brazil) Jaime Melo, Lola B99/50, 2003, F3000)

The Circuito Cittadino di Cagliari was a temporary street circuit that encircled the Stadio Sant'Elia football stadium in Cagliari, Italy. The circuit was inaugurated on 10 November 2002. On that weekend the circuit hosted the final race of Euro Formula 3000. After this, the circuit hosted the race the year after, 2003.

== Lap records ==
The official race lap records at the Circuito di Cagliari are listed as:

Category	Time	Driver	Vehicle	Event
Street Circuit (2002–2003): 2.414 km (1.500 mi)
F3000	1:08.045	Jaime Melo	Lola B99/50	2003 Cagliari Euro F3000 round
F3	1:09.160	Robert Kubica	Dallara F303	2003 Sardinia F3 Masters
