= 2007 24 Hours of Daytona =

Previous: 2006	Next: 2008
Index: Races | Winners

Track map of Daytona International Speedway

The 2007 Rolex 24 at Daytona was a Grand-Am Rolex Sports Car Series 24-hour endurance sports car race held on January 27–28, 2007 at the Daytona International Speedway road course. The overall winner of the race was the Chip Ganassi/Felix Sabates-owned #01 car, a Lexus-powered Riley MkXI, driven by Juan Pablo Montoya, Salvador Durán, and Scott Pruett. The GT class was won by the #22 Alegra Motorsports/Fiorano Racing Porsche GT3 Cup car driven by driver/owner Carlos de Quesada, Jean-François Dumoulin, Scooter Gabel, and Porsche factory driver Marc Basseng.

== Prelude ==
GAINSCO/Bob Stallings Racing driver Alex Gurney took the pole, his fourth in Rolex Series competition, with a lap of 1:43.475 at an average speed of 123.856 mph (199.327 km/h).

== Race ==
At the green flag, which fell just past 1:30 p.m. Eastern time, Gurney jumped into the lead and the field made its way around the first lap cleanly. But after only seven laps of the 24-hour race, Gurney crashed into the back of a slower GT car which had lost its hood and unexpectedly slowed dramatically. The team would make repairs, but Gurney's GAINSCO Auto Insurance-sponsored Pontiac-powered Riley, which was co-driven by Jon Fogarty and Jimmy Vasser, would never again be in contention for the win.

On January 28, an early morning wreck of the #82 Porsche GT3 Cup, driven by Chris Pallis, damaged part of the outer retaining wall, causing the race stewards to display the red flag for only the third time in the history of the 24 Hours of Daytona, temporarily suspending the race while repairs took place. An exciting battle took place between three different teams with a diverse group of drivers. The DP class fight was between eventual winner Telmex Chip Ganassi Racing's Juan Pablo Montoya and Scott Pruett, SunTrust Racing's Max Angelelli and SAMAX Motorsport's Patrick Carpentier. Polesitter Alex Gurney's hopes for victory were dashed when his GAINSCO/Bob Stallings Racing Pontiac Riley was damaged in a first-hour accident.

=== 1,000,000th lap ===
At 11:11 a.m. on the morning of January 28, British-born female Champ Car driver Katherine Legge made history by completing the one millionth lap of the Rolex Daytona 24 hour race, since its inception. Legge, driving the #84 Robinson Racing Pontiac-powered Riley DP car, passed the finish line with less than 2 and a half hours left in the race, completing the 30,419th lap of the 2007 running of the race. Legge was lying in the 31st position at the time.

3 women competed at this years race. Valerie Limoges of Canada, Katherine Legge of Great Britain & Milka Duno of Venezuela.

Juan Pablo Montoya became the first racer in history to have won a Formula One race, the Indianapolis 500, a Champ Car title, and the 24 Hours of Daytona. Mario Andretti also won a Formula One race, a Champ Car title and an endurance sports car race at Daytona, but Andretti's victory came in the 1972 event alongside co-driver Jacky Ickx in a six-hour event.

== Race results ==
Class winners in bold.

Pos	Class	No	Team	Drivers	Chassis	Laps
Pos	Class	No	Team	Drivers	Engine	Laps
1	**DP**	**01**	**(United States) Telmex Chip Ganassi Racing with Felix Sabates**	**(United States) Scott Pruett (Mexico) Salvador Durán (Colombia) Juan Pablo Montoya**	**Riley Mk XI**	**668**
1	**DP**	**01**	**(United States) Telmex Chip Ganassi Racing with Felix Sabates**	**(United States) Scott Pruett (Mexico) Salvador Durán (Colombia) Juan Pablo Montoya**	**Lexus 5.0 L V8**	**668**
2	DP	11	(United States) SAMAX Motorsport	(Venezuela) Milka Duno (Canada) Patrick Carpentier (United Kingdom) Darren Manning (United Kingdom) Ryan Dalziel	Riley Mk XI	668
2	DP	11	(United States) SAMAX Motorsport	(Venezuela) Milka Duno (Canada) Patrick Carpentier (United Kingdom) Darren Manning (United Kingdom) Ryan Dalziel	Pontiac 5.0 L V8	668
3	DP	10	(United States) SunTrust Racing	(South Africa) Wayne Taylor (Italy) Max Angelelli (United States) Jeff Gordon (Denmark) Jan Magnussen	Riley Mk XI	666
3	DP	10	(United States) SunTrust Racing	(South Africa) Wayne Taylor (Italy) Max Angelelli (United States) Jeff Gordon (Denmark) Jan Magnussen	Pontiac 5.0 L V8	666
4	DP	59	(United States) Brumos Racing	(United States) J. C. France (United States) Hurley Haywood (Portugal) João Barbosa (Brazil) Roberto Moreno (United States) David Donohue	Riley Mk XI	662
4	DP	59	(United States) Brumos Racing	(United States) J. C. France (United States) Hurley Haywood (Portugal) João Barbosa (Brazil) Roberto Moreno (United States) David Donohue	Porsche 3.6 L Flat-6	662
5	DP	61	(United States) Exchange Traded Gold AIM Autosport	(United States) Brian Frisselle (United States) Burt Frisselle (Canada) Mark Wilkins (Canada) David Empringham	Riley Mk XI	657
5	DP	61	(United States) Exchange Traded Gold AIM Autosport	(United States) Brian Frisselle (United States) Burt Frisselle (Canada) Mark Wilkins (Canada) David Empringham	Lexus 5.0 L V8	657
6	DP	7	(United States) SAMAX Motorsport	(United States) Chris Festa (Czech Republic) Tomáš Enge (San Marino) Christian Montanari (United States) Roger Yasukawa (United States) Kris Szekeres	Riley Mk XI	655
6	DP	7	(United States) SAMAX Motorsport	(United States) Chris Festa (Czech Republic) Tomáš Enge (San Marino) Christian Montanari (United States) Roger Yasukawa (United States) Kris Szekeres	Pontiac 5.0 L V8	655
7	DP	77	(United States) Feeds The Need/Doran Racing	(United States) Memo Gidley (Italy) Fabrizio Gollin (Mexico) Michel Jourdain Jr. (Spain) Oriol Servià	Doran JE4	655
7	DP	77	(United States) Feeds The Need/Doran Racing	(United States) Memo Gidley (Italy) Fabrizio Gollin (Mexico) Michel Jourdain Jr. (Spain) Oriol Servià	Ford 5.0 L V8	655
8	DP	47	(United States) TruSpeed Motorsports	(United States) Charles Morgan (United States) Rob Morgan (Germany) Timo Bernhard (United States) B. J. Zacharias	Riley Mk XI	636
8	DP	47	(United States) TruSpeed Motorsports	(United States) Charles Morgan (United States) Rob Morgan (Germany) Timo Bernhard (United States) B. J. Zacharias	Porsche 3.6 L Flat-6	636
9	DP	60	(United States) Michael Shank Racing	(United States) Mark Patterson (Brazil) Oswaldo Negri Jr. (Brazil) Hélio Castroneves (United States) Sam Hornish Jr.	Riley Mk XI	628
9	DP	60	(United States) Michael Shank Racing	(United States) Mark Patterson (Brazil) Oswaldo Negri Jr. (Brazil) Hélio Castroneves (United States) Sam Hornish Jr.	Lexus 5.0 L V8	628
10 DNF	DP	19	(United States) Finlay Motorsports	(United States) Rob Finlay (Canada) Michael Valiante (United States) Michael McDowell (United States) Bobby Labonte	Crawford DP03	627
10 DNF	DP	19	(United States) Finlay Motorsports	(United States) Rob Finlay (Canada) Michael Valiante (United States) Michael McDowell (United States) Bobby Labonte	Ford 5.0 L V8	627
11	**GT**	**22**	**(United States) Alegra Motorsports/Fiorano Racing**	**(United States) Carlos de Quesada (Canada) Jean-François Dumoulin (United States) Scooter Gabel (Germany) Marc Basseng**	**Porsche 997 GT3 Cup**	**626**
11	**GT**	**22**	**(United States) Alegra Motorsports/Fiorano Racing**	**(United States) Carlos de Quesada (Canada) Jean-François Dumoulin (United States) Scooter Gabel (Germany) Marc Basseng**	**Porsche 3.6 L Flat-6**	**626**
12	GT	07	(United States) Banner Racing	(United States) Paul Edwards (United States) Kelly Collins (United States) Andy Pilgrim (United States) Johnny O'Connell	Pontiac GXP.R	626
12	GT	07	(United States) Banner Racing	(United States) Paul Edwards (United States) Kelly Collins (United States) Andy Pilgrim (United States) Johnny O'Connell	Pontiac LS2 6.0 L V8	626
13	GT	64	(United States) The Racer's Group	(United States) Jim Lowe (United States) Jim Pace (United States) Johannes van Overbeek (Germany) Ralf Kelleners	Porsche 997 GT3 Cup	625
13	GT	64	(United States) The Racer's Group	(United States) Jim Lowe (United States) Jim Pace (United States) Johannes van Overbeek (Germany) Ralf Kelleners	Porsche 3.6 L Flat-6	625
14	GT	06	(United States) Banner Racing	(United States) Leighton Reese (United States) Tim Lewis Jr. (United States) Johnny O'Connell (United States) Paul Edwards	Pontiac GXP.R	624
14	GT	06	(United States) Banner Racing	(United States) Leighton Reese (United States) Tim Lewis Jr. (United States) Johnny O'Connell (United States) Paul Edwards	Pontiac LS2 6.0 L V8	624
15	GT	70	(United States) SpeedSource	(United States) David Haskell (Canada) Sylvain Trembley (United States) Nick Ham (United States) Randy Pobst	Mazda RX-8	624
15	GT	70	(United States) SpeedSource	(United States) David Haskell (Canada) Sylvain Trembley (United States) Nick Ham (United States) Randy Pobst	Mazda 1.3 L 3-Rotor	624
16	GT	73	(United States) Tafel Racing	(Denmark) Lars Nielsen (Austria) Dieter Quester (United States) Brent Martini (Austria) Philipp Peter	Porsche 997 GT3 Cup	617
16	GT	73	(United States) Tafel Racing	(Denmark) Lars Nielsen (Austria) Dieter Quester (United States) Brent Martini (Austria) Philipp Peter	Porsche 3.6 L Flat-6	617
17	DP	75	(United States) Krohn Racing	(United States) Colin Braun (Italy) Max Papis (Finland) JJ Lehto	Riley Mk XI	615
17	DP	75	(United States) Krohn Racing	(United States) Colin Braun (Italy) Max Papis (Finland) JJ Lehto	Pontiac 5.0 L V8	615
18	DP	23	(United States) Ruby Tuesday Championship Racing	(Germany) Jörg Bergmeister (France) Romain Dumas (United States) Patrick Long	Crawford DP03	615
18	DP	23	(United States) Ruby Tuesday Championship Racing	(Germany) Jörg Bergmeister (France) Romain Dumas (United States) Patrick Long	Porsche 3.6 L Flat-6	615
19	GT	69	(United States) SpeedSource	(United States) Emil Assentato (United States) Nick Longhi (United States) Jeff Segal (United States) Matt Plumb	Mazda RX-8	612
19	GT	69	(United States) SpeedSource	(United States) Emil Assentato (United States) Nick Longhi (United States) Jeff Segal (United States) Matt Plumb	Mazda 1.3 L 3-Rotor	612
20	GT	17	(Canada) Doncaster Racing	(Canada) Dave Lacey (Canada) Greg Wilkins (United Kingdom) Johnny Mowlem (United States) Tom Papadopoulos (Germany) Lance David Arnold	Porsche 997 GT3 Cup	611
20	GT	17	(Canada) Doncaster Racing	(Canada) Dave Lacey (Canada) Greg Wilkins (United Kingdom) Johnny Mowlem (United States) Tom Papadopoulos (Germany) Lance David Arnold	Porsche 3.6 L Flat-6	611
21	DP	76	(United States) Krohn Racing	(United States) Tracy Krohn (Sweden) Niclas Jönsson (United States) Boris Said	Riley Mk XI	607
21	DP	76	(United States) Krohn Racing	(United States) Tracy Krohn (Sweden) Niclas Jönsson (United States) Boris Said	Pontiac 5.0 L V8	607
22	GT	35	(United States) Playboy Racing/Unitech	(United States) Tommy Constantine (United States) Mike Borkowski (United States) David Murry (United States) Hal Prewitt	Porsche 997 GT3 Cup	606
22	GT	35	(United States) Playboy Racing/Unitech	(United States) Tommy Constantine (United States) Mike Borkowski (United States) David Murry (United States) Hal Prewitt	Porsche 3.6 L Flat-6	606
23	GT	27	(United States) O'Connell Racing	(United States) Kevin O'Connell (United States) Mike Speakman (United States) Jason Bowles (United States) Kevin Roush (United States) Lonnie Pechnik	Porsche 996 GT3 Cup	605
23	GT	27	(United States) O'Connell Racing	(United States) Kevin O'Connell (United States) Mike Speakman (United States) Jason Bowles (United States) Kevin Roush (United States) Lonnie Pechnik	Porsche 3.6 L Flat-6	605
24	DP	39	(United States) Cheever Racing	(Brazil) Christian Fittipaldi (United States) Eddie Cheever (France) Emmanuel Collard (Germany) Sascha Maassen	Crawford DP03	601
24	DP	39	(United States) Cheever Racing	(Brazil) Christian Fittipaldi (United States) Eddie Cheever (France) Emmanuel Collard (Germany) Sascha Maassen	Porsche 3.6 L Flat-6	601
25	DP	84	(United States) Robinson Racing	(United States) George Robinson (United States) Wally Dallenbach Jr. (United States) Paul Dallenbach (United Kingdom) Katherine Legge	Riley Mk XI	596
25	DP	84	(United States) Robinson Racing	(United States) George Robinson (United States) Wally Dallenbach Jr. (United States) Paul Dallenbach (United Kingdom) Katherine Legge	Pontiac 5.0 L V8	596
26	DP	6	(United States) Michael Shank Racing	(United States) Henry Zogaib (United Kingdom) Ian James (Canada) Paul Tracy (United States) A. J. Allmendinger	Riley Mk XI	595
26	DP	6	(United States) Michael Shank Racing	(United States) Henry Zogaib (United Kingdom) Ian James (Canada) Paul Tracy (United States) A. J. Allmendinger	Lexus 5.0 L V8	595
27	GT	81	(United States) Synergy Racing	(United States) Steve Johnson (United Kingdom) Richard Westbrook (Austria) Richard Lietz (Netherlands) Patrick Huisman	Porsche 997 GT3 Cup	590
27	GT	81	(United States) Synergy Racing	(United States) Steve Johnson (United Kingdom) Richard Westbrook (Austria) Richard Lietz (Netherlands) Patrick Huisman	Porsche 3.6 L Flat-6	590
28	GT	67	(United States) The Racer's Group	(Belgium) Tom Cloet (Canada) Pierre Bourque (United States) Mike Solley (United States) Auston Harris	Porsche 997 GT3 Cup	588
28	GT	67	(United States) The Racer's Group	(Belgium) Tom Cloet (Canada) Pierre Bourque (United States) Mike Solley (United States) Auston Harris	Porsche 3.6 L Flat-6	588
29 DNF	DP	00	(United States) Vision Racing	(United States) Ed Carpenter (South Africa) Tomas Scheckter (United States) Tony George (United States) A. J. Foyt IV (France) Stéphane Grégoire	Crawford DP03	587
29 DNF	DP	00	(United States) Vision Racing	(United States) Ed Carpenter (South Africa) Tomas Scheckter (United States) Tony George (United States) A. J. Foyt IV (France) Stéphane Grégoire	Porsche 3.6 L Flat-6	587
30	GT	65	(United States) The Racer's Group	(United States) Murray Marden (United States) Brent Milner (United States) John Peterson (United States) Michael Gomez	Porsche 997 GT3 Cup	583
30	GT	65	(United States) The Racer's Group	(United States) Murray Marden (United States) Brent Milner (United States) John Peterson (United States) Michael Gomez	Porsche 3.6 L Flat-6	583
31 DNF	GT	85	(United States) Farnbacher Loles Racing	(United States) Leh Keen (Germany) Pierre Ehret (Germany) Dirk Werner (Germany) Jörg Hardt	Porsche 997 GT3 Cup	579
31 DNF	GT	85	(United States) Farnbacher Loles Racing	(United States) Leh Keen (Germany) Pierre Ehret (Germany) Dirk Werner (Germany) Jörg Hardt	Porsche 3.6 L Flat-6	579
32	DP	51	(United States) Cheever Racing	(United Kingdom) Mike Newton (Brazil) Thomas Erdos (United States) Harrison Brix (United States) Eddie Cheever	Fabcar FDSC/03	579
32	DP	51	(United States) Cheever Racing	(United Kingdom) Mike Newton (Brazil) Thomas Erdos (United States) Harrison Brix (United States) Eddie Cheever	Porsche 3.6 L Flat-6	579
33	GT	68	(United States) The Racer's Group	(United States) Ted Ballou (United States) Rocco DeSimone II (United States) Brad Jaeger (United States) Chris Gleason	Porsche 997 GT3 Cup	578
33	GT	68	(United States) The Racer's Group	(United States) Ted Ballou (United States) Rocco DeSimone II (United States) Brad Jaeger (United States) Chris Gleason	Porsche 3.6 L Flat-6	578
34	GT	14	(United States) Autometrics Motorsports	(United States) Bransen Patch (United States) Mac McGehee (United States) Wes Allen (United States) Jim Hamblin (United States) Cory Friedman	Porsche 996 GT3 Cup	572
34	GT	14	(United States) Autometrics Motorsports	(United States) Bransen Patch (United States) Mac McGehee (United States) Wes Allen (United States) Jim Hamblin (United States) Cory Friedman	Porsche 3.6 L Flat-6	572
35	GT	66	(United States) The Racer's Group	(United States) Spencer Pumpelly (United States) R. J. Valentine (United States) Andy Lally (United States) Mark Greenberg (United States) Kevin Buckler	Porsche 997 GT3 Cup	563
35	GT	66	(United States) The Racer's Group	(United States) Spencer Pumpelly (United States) R. J. Valentine (United States) Andy Lally (United States) Mark Greenberg (United States) Kevin Buckler	Porsche 3.6 L Flat-6	563
36 DNF	DP	91	(United States) Lowe's Riley-Matthews Motorsports	(United States) Jim Matthews (Belgium) Marc Goossens (United States) Jimmie Johnson (United States) Ryan Hunter-Reay	Riley Mk XI	560
36 DNF	DP	91	(United States) Lowe's Riley-Matthews Motorsports	(United States) Jim Matthews (Belgium) Marc Goossens (United States) Jimmie Johnson (United States) Ryan Hunter-Reay	Pontiac 5.0 L V8	560
37	GT	72	(United States) Tafel Racing	(United States) Andrew Davis (United States) Nathan Swartzbaugh (United Kingdom) Robin Liddell (Germany) Dirk Müller (United States) Jim Tafel	Porsche 997 GT3 Cup	555
37	GT	72	(United States) Tafel Racing	(United States) Andrew Davis (United States) Nathan Swartzbaugh (United Kingdom) Robin Liddell (Germany) Dirk Müller (United States) Jim Tafel	Porsche 3.6 L Flat-6	555
38	GT	87	(United States) Farnbacher Loles Racing	(Germany) Christian Zugel (United States) John Burke (United States) Gunnar Jeannette (United States) Ryan Eversley	Porsche 997 GT3 Cup	545
38	GT	87	(United States) Farnbacher Loles Racing	(Germany) Christian Zugel (United States) John Burke (United States) Gunnar Jeannette (United States) Ryan Eversley	Porsche 3.6 L Flat-6	545
39 DNF	GT	74	(United States) Tafel Racing	(United States) Eric Lux (Germany) Wolf Henzler (Germany) Dominik Farnbacher (United States) Jim Tafel	Porsche 997 GT3 Cup	544
39 DNF	GT	74	(United States) Tafel Racing	(United States) Eric Lux (Germany) Wolf Henzler (Germany) Dominik Farnbacher (United States) Jim Tafel	Porsche 3.6 L Flat-6	544
40	DP	58	(United States) Brumos Racing	(United States) David Donohue (United States) Darren Law (United States) Buddy Rice (United States) Scott Sharp (United States) Hurley Haywood	Riley Mk XI	542
40	DP	58	(United States) Brumos Racing	(United States) David Donohue (United States) Darren Law (United States) Buddy Rice (United States) Scott Sharp (United States) Hurley Haywood	Porsche 3.6 L Flat-6	542
41 DNF	DP	02	(United States) Target Chip Ganassi Racing with Felix Sabates	(New Zealand) Scott Dixon (United Kingdom) Dan Wheldon (Mexico) Memo Rojas	Riley Mk XI	538
41 DNF	DP	02	(United States) Target Chip Ganassi Racing with Felix Sabates	(New Zealand) Scott Dixon (United Kingdom) Dan Wheldon (Mexico) Memo Rojas	Lexus 5.0 L V8	538
42	GT	43	(United States) Team Sahlen	(United States) Joe Sahlen (United States) Joe Nonnamaker (United States) Will Nonnamaker (United States) Wayne Nonnamaker	Chevrolet Corvette	530
42	GT	43	(United States) Team Sahlen	(United States) Joe Sahlen (United States) Joe Nonnamaker (United States) Will Nonnamaker (United States) Wayne Nonnamaker	Chevrolet LS2 6.0 L V8	530
43	GT	42	(United States) Team Sahlen	(United States) Michael Auriemma (United States) John Mayes (United States) David Kaemmer (United States) Chris Willcox (United States) Matt Varsha	Porsche 996 GT3 Cup	514
43	GT	42	(United States) Team Sahlen	(United States) Michael Auriemma (United States) John Mayes (United States) David Kaemmer (United States) Chris Willcox (United States) Matt Varsha	Porsche 3.6 L Flat-6	514
44	GT	89	(United States) Autometrics Motorsports	(United States) Fraser Wellon (United States) Barry Ellis (Canada) Frank Rossi (United States) Michael Grande (United States) Owen Trinkler	Porsche 997 GT3 Cup	512
44	GT	89	(United States) Autometrics Motorsports	(United States) Fraser Wellon (United States) Barry Ellis (Canada) Frank Rossi (United States) Michael Grande (United States) Owen Trinkler	Porsche 3.6 L Flat-6	512
45	GT	83	(United States) Synergy Racing	(United States) Dave Gaylord (United States) Don Pickering (United States) Hal Hilton (United States) Ben McCrackin	Porsche 997 GT3 Cup	508
45	GT	83	(United States) Synergy Racing	(United States) Dave Gaylord (United States) Don Pickering (United States) Hal Hilton (United States) Ben McCrackin	Porsche 3.6 L Flat-6	508
46 DNF	DP	99	(United States) GAINSCO/Bob Stallings Racing	(United States) Alex Gurney (United States) Jon Fogarty (United States) Jimmy Vasser (United States) Bob Stallings	Riley Mk XI	493
46 DNF	DP	99	(United States) GAINSCO/Bob Stallings Racing	(United States) Alex Gurney (United States) Jon Fogarty (United States) Jimmy Vasser (United States) Bob Stallings	Pontiac 5.0 L V8	493
47 DNF	DP	12	(United States) RVO Motorsports	(United States) Roger Schramm (United States) Jack Baldwin (United States) Bill Lester (United Kingdom) Justin Bell (United States) John Heinricy	Riley Mk XI	458
47 DNF	DP	12	(United States) RVO Motorsports	(United States) Roger Schramm (United States) Jack Baldwin (United States) Bill Lester (United Kingdom) Justin Bell (United States) John Heinricy	Pontiac 5.0 L V8	458
48 DNF	DP	20	(United States) Howard Motorsports	(United Kingdom) Andy Wallace (United States) Butch Leitzinger (United States) Tony Stewart	Crawford DP03	450
48 DNF	DP	20	(United States) Howard Motorsports	(United Kingdom) Andy Wallace (United States) Butch Leitzinger (United States) Tony Stewart	Pontiac 5.0 L V8	450
49	GT	57	(United States) Stevenson Motorsports	(United States) Dominic Cicero II (United States) Marc Bunting (United States) James Gue (United States) John Stevenson (United States) Lou Gigliotti	Chevrolet Corvette Z06	444
49	GT	57	(United States) Stevenson Motorsports	(United States) Dominic Cicero II (United States) Marc Bunting (United States) James Gue (United States) John Stevenson (United States) Lou Gigliotti	Chevrolet LS7 7.0 L V8	444
50 DNF	GT	88	(United States) Farnbacher Loles Racing	(United States) Craig Stanton (United States) Bryce Miller (Czech Republic) Antonín Charouz (United States) Justin Jackson (United States) Tom Pank	Porsche 997 GT3 Cup	434
50 DNF	GT	88	(United States) Farnbacher Loles Racing	(United States) Craig Stanton (United States) Bryce Miller (Czech Republic) Antonín Charouz (United States) Justin Jackson (United States) Tom Pank	Porsche 3.6 L Flat-6	434
51	GT	97	(United States) Stevenson Motorsports	(United States) Vic Rice (United States) Tommy Riggins (United States) John Stevenson (United States) Spencer Trenery (United States) Lou Gigliotti	Chevrolet Corvette Z06	414
51	GT	97	(United States) Stevenson Motorsports	(United States) Vic Rice (United States) Tommy Riggins (United States) John Stevenson (United States) Spencer Trenery (United States) Lou Gigliotti	Chevrolet LS7 7.0 L V8	414
52 DNF	DP	05	(United States) Luggage Express Team Sigalsport BMW	(United States) Bill Auberlen (United States) Matthew Alhadeff (United States) Gene Sigal (Austria) Karl Wendlinger	Riley Mk XI	367
52 DNF	DP	05	(United States) Luggage Express Team Sigalsport BMW	(United States) Bill Auberlen (United States) Matthew Alhadeff (United States) Gene Sigal (Austria) Karl Wendlinger	BMW 5.0 L V8	367
53 DNF	GT	30	(United States) Racer's Edge Motorsports	(United States) Lawson Aschenbach (United States) Justin Lofton (United States) Ross Smith (Canada) Mark Pavan	Pontiac GXP.R	359
53 DNF	GT	30	(United States) Racer's Edge Motorsports	(United States) Lawson Aschenbach (United States) Justin Lofton (United States) Ross Smith (Canada) Mark Pavan	Pontiac LS2 6.0 L V8	359
54 DNF	GT	41	(United States) Team Sahlen	(United States) Robb Brent (United States) Tom Malloy (United States) Jim Michaelian (United States) Bob Michaelian (United States) Ernie Becker	Porsche 996 GT3 Cup	316
54 DNF	GT	41	(United States) Team Sahlen	(United States) Robb Brent (United States) Tom Malloy (United States) Jim Michaelian (United States) Bob Michaelian (United States) Ernie Becker	Porsche 3.6 L Flat-6	316
55 DNF	DP	16	(United States) Howard Motorsports	(United States) Chris Dyson (United States) Rob Dyson (United Kingdom) Guy Smith (United Kingdom) Oliver Gavin	Crawford DP03	295
55 DNF	DP	16	(United States) Howard Motorsports	(United States) Chris Dyson (United States) Rob Dyson (United Kingdom) Guy Smith (United Kingdom) Oliver Gavin	Porsche 3.6 L Flat-6	295
56 DNF	GT	24	(United States) Matt Connolly Motorsports	(United States) Matt Pickett (United States) Bill Cotter (United States) Mark Montgomery (United States) Todd Hanson (United States) Rich Walker	BMW M3 E46	276
56 DNF	GT	24	(United States) Matt Connolly Motorsports	(United States) Matt Pickett (United States) Bill Cotter (United States) Mark Montgomery (United States) Todd Hanson (United States) Rich Walker	BMW 3.2 L I6	276
57 DNF	GT	82	(United States) Synergy Racing	(United States) Don Kitch Jr. (United States) Chris Pennington (United States) Chris Pallis (United States) Tony Bawcutt	Porsche 997 GT3 Cup	250
57 DNF	GT	82	(United States) Synergy Racing	(United States) Don Kitch Jr. (United States) Chris Pennington (United States) Chris Pallis (United States) Tony Bawcutt	Porsche 3.6 L Flat-6	250
58 DNF	DP	18	(United States) VICI Racing	(Germany) Uwe Alzen (Germany) Robert Renauer (United States) Terry Borcheller (Argentina) Gastón Mazzacane	Fabcar FDSC/03	240
58 DNF	DP	18	(United States) VICI Racing	(Germany) Uwe Alzen (Germany) Robert Renauer (United States) Terry Borcheller (Argentina) Gastón Mazzacane	Porsche 3.6 L Flat-6	240
59 DNF	GT	15	(United States) Blackforest Motorsports	(United States) Tom Nastasi (Canada) Alex Tagliani (United States) Guy Cosmo (Canada) Valerie Limoges	Ford Mustang Cobra GT	235
59 DNF	GT	15	(United States) Blackforest Motorsports	(United States) Tom Nastasi (Canada) Alex Tagliani (United States) Guy Cosmo (Canada) Valerie Limoges	Ford 4.6 L V8	235
60	GT	86	(United States) Farnbacher Loles Racing	(United States) Larry Bowman (United States) Don Bell (United States) Lance Willsley (United States) Shawn Price	Porsche 997 GT3 Cup	232
60	GT	86	(United States) Farnbacher Loles Racing	(United States) Larry Bowman (United States) Don Bell (United States) Lance Willsley (United States) Shawn Price	Porsche 3.6 L Flat-6	232
61 DNF	GT	45	(United States) Howard Motorsports	(New Zealand) Rob Wilson (United States) John Lewis (United States) Bryan Sellers (United States) Joey Hand	Infiniti G35	230
61 DNF	GT	45	(United States) Howard Motorsports	(New Zealand) Rob Wilson (United States) John Lewis (United States) Bryan Sellers (United States) Joey Hand	Infiniti 3.7 L V6	230
62 DNF	DP	3	(United States) Southard Motorsports	(United States) Shane Lewis (United States) Randy Ruhlman (United States) Graham Rahal (United States) Elliott Forbes-Robinson	Riley Mk XI	214
62 DNF	DP	3	(United States) Southard Motorsports	(United States) Shane Lewis (United States) Randy Ruhlman (United States) Graham Rahal (United States) Elliott Forbes-Robinson	Lexus 5.0 L V8	214
63 DNF	GT	28	(United States) At Speed Motorsports	(United States) Ian Baas (United States) Joel Feinberg (United States) Bruce McQuiston (United States) Joseph Safina	Porsche 997 GT3 Cup	196
63 DNF	GT	28	(United States) At Speed Motorsports	(United States) Ian Baas (United States) Joel Feinberg (United States) Bruce McQuiston (United States) Joseph Safina	Porsche 3.6 L Flat-6	196
64 DNF	GT	46	(United States) Michael Baughman Racing	(United States) Michael Baughman (United States) Bryan Collyer (United States) John Connolly (United States) Mike Yeakle (United States) Frank Del Vecchio	Chevrolet Corvette	186
64 DNF	GT	46	(United States) Michael Baughman Racing	(United States) Michael Baughman (United States) Bryan Collyer (United States) John Connolly (United States) Mike Yeakle (United States) Frank Del Vecchio	Chevrolet 5.7 L V8	186
65 DNF	GT	08	(United States) Goldin Brothers Racing	(United States) Steve Goldin (United States) Keith Goldin (United States) John Finger (United States) Ronald Zitza	Mazda RX-8	163
65 DNF	GT	08	(United States) Goldin Brothers Racing	(United States) Steve Goldin (United States) Keith Goldin (United States) John Finger (United States) Ronald Zitza	Mazda 1.3 L 3-Rotor	163
66 DNF	GT	21	(United States) Matt Connolly Motorsports	(United States) Matt Connolly (United States) Adam Pecorari (United States) Jason Workman (United States) Ray Mason (United States) Romeo Kapudija	BMW M3 E46	153
66 DNF	GT	21	(United States) Matt Connolly Motorsports	(United States) Matt Connolly (United States) Adam Pecorari (United States) Jason Workman (United States) Ray Mason (United States) Romeo Kapudija	BMW 3.2 L I6	153
67 DNF	GT	48	(Switzerland) WTF Engineering	(Switzerland) Hans Hauser (Switzerland) Robert Dubler (United States) Ed Magner (United Kingdom) Michael DeFontes	Chevrolet Corvette	89
67 DNF	GT	48	(Switzerland) WTF Engineering	(Switzerland) Hans Hauser (Switzerland) Robert Dubler (United States) Ed Magner (United Kingdom) Michael DeFontes	Chevrolet 5.7 L V8	89
68 DNF	GT	52	(Italy) Mastercar	(Italy) Luca Drudi (Italy) Gabrio Rosa (Italy) Andrea Ceccato (Italy) Pierangelo Masselli (Italy) Andrea Montermini	Ferrari 360 Modena Challenge	83
68 DNF	GT	52	(Italy) Mastercar	(Italy) Luca Drudi (Italy) Gabrio Rosa (Italy) Andrea Ceccato (Italy) Pierangelo Masselli (Italy) Andrea Montermini	Ferrari 3.6 L V8	83
69 DNF	GT	63	(United States) Team Spencer Motorsports	(United States) Dennis Spencer (United States) Scott Spencer (United States) Rich Grupp (United States) Gary Drummond (United States) Charles Espenlaub	Mazda RX-8	74
69 DNF	GT	63	(United States) Team Spencer Motorsports	(United States) Dennis Spencer (United States) Scott Spencer (United States) Rich Grupp (United States) Gary Drummond (United States) Charles Espenlaub	Mazda 1.3 L 3-Rotor	74
DNS	GT	49	(United States) Team Sahlen	(United States) Joe Sahlen (United States) Joe Nonnamaker (United States) Will Nonnamaker (United States) Wayne Nonnamaker	Chevrolet Corvette	-
DNS	GT	49	(United States) Team Sahlen	(United States) Joe Sahlen (United States) Joe Nonnamaker (United States) Will Nonnamaker (United States) Wayne Nonnamaker	Chevrolet LS2 6.0 L V8	-
