= Milka Duno =

Venezuelan racing driver and model

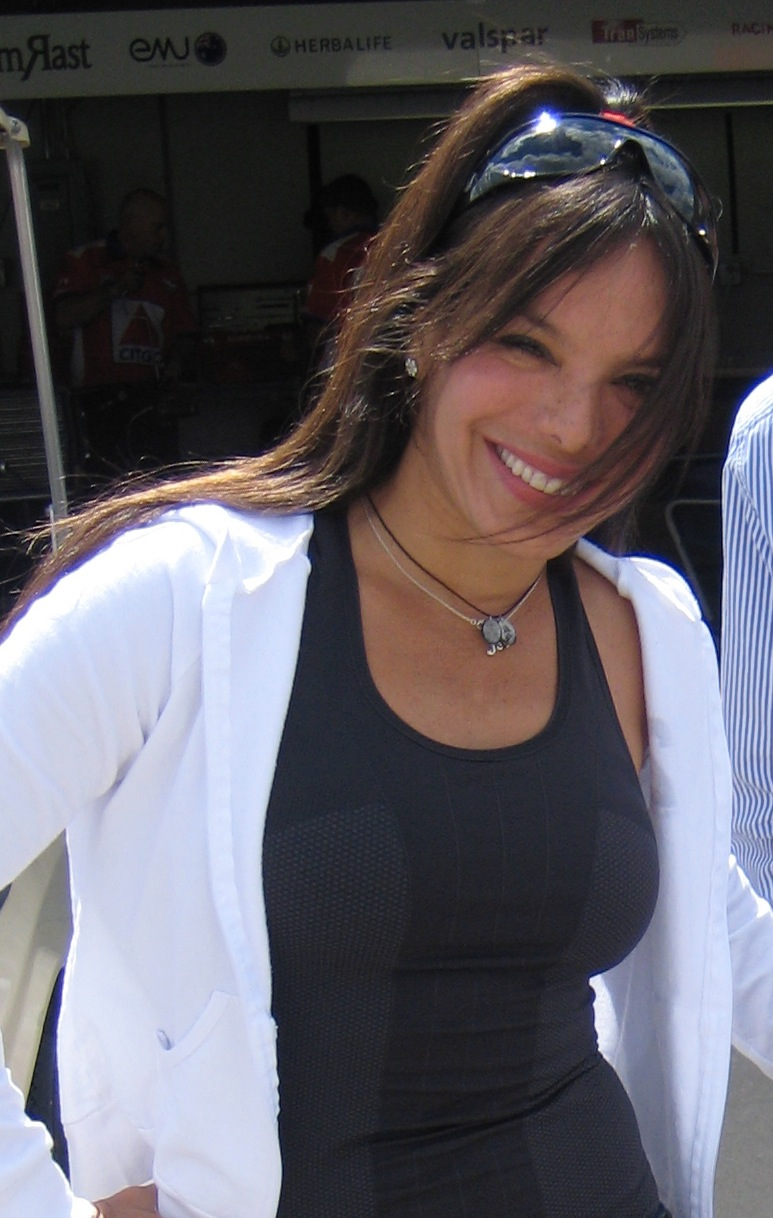
- Duno in 2008
- Born: Milka Beatriz Duno-Olivero; April 22, 1972 (age 54) Caracas, Venezuela

Previous series
- 2011–2013 2007–2010 2004–2007 2000–2002 2004 2003 2001–2002 2002 2000 1999 1998: ARCA Racing Series; IndyCar Series; Rolex Sports Car Series; American Le Mans Series; World Series Lights; World Series by Nissan; Formula Nissan 2000; Barber Dodge Pro Series; Women's Global GT Series; Venezuelan Porsche Supercup

IndyCar Series career
- 43 races run over 4 years
- Best finish: 11th (2007)
- First race: 2007 Kansas Lottery Indy 300 (Kansas)
- Last race: 2010 Cafés do Brasil Indy 300 (Homestead)
Wins	Podiums	Poles
0	0	0

NASCAR O'Reilly Auto Parts Series career
- 2 races run over 1 year
- 2014 position: 74th
- Best finish: 74th (2014)
- First race: 2014 Kansas Lottery 300 (Kansas)
- Last race: 2014 Ford EcoBoost 300 (Homestead)
Wins	Top tens	Poles
0	0	0

NASCAR FedEx Freight Truck Series career
- 1 race run over 1 year
- 2014 position: 103rd
- Best finish: 25th (2014)
- First race: 2014 Fred's 250 (Talladega)
Wins	Top tens	Poles
0	0	0

24 Hours of Le Mans career
- Years: 2001, 2002
- Teams: Dick Barbour Racing, MBD Sportscar
- Best finish: 28th
- Class wins: 0
- Statistics current as of November 15, 2014.

Milka Beatriz Duno-Olivero (born April 22, 1972) is a Venezuelan real estate agent and former race car driver who competed in the IndyCar Series and ARCA Racing Series. She is best known for holding the record of highest finish for a female driver in the 24 Hours of Daytona. She entered the NASCAR Nationwide Series in 2014.

Duno's racing career is unusual because of her late start. She was introduced to the sport when she was invited to a driving clinic by a car club in Venezuela and did not start racing until she was 24. Prior to racing, her background was primarily academic. Duno holds master's degrees in organizational development, naval architecture, maritime business, and marine biology, and she has prior experience working as a naval engineer.

== Biography ==
=== Racing career ===
Duno began her career as a driver in Venezuela in 1996, finishing second in the Venezuelan GT Championship. In 1998, she placed fourth in the Venezuelan Porsche Supercup Championship. In 1999, she moved to the United States, attended advanced racing schools, and drove in the Barber Dodge Pro Series in 2000. Duno was the first woman in history to win a Ferrari Challenge Race in the USA; at that time she also won her first Series Championship, The Panoz GT Series.

Later in 2000, Duno made her American Le Mans Series debut; she was the first woman to finish in a class podium on this championship. She made her 24 Hours of Daytona debut the next year and her 24 Hours of Le Mans debut a year later. In 2001 and 2003, Duno also competed in the World Series by Nissan open-wheel series in Europe; she became the first woman to score points in this championship. Also in 2001, she was crowned Vice-Champion Driver in the LMP 675 Class of the American Le Mans Series. She scored an impressive four wins in this class, including the prestigious 10 hours Petit Le Mans, becoming the first woman to score a class win in this major international sportscar competition. In 2004, she scored yet another LMP 675 class win in Petit Le Mans.

Beginning in 2004, Duno competed full-time in the Rolex Grand-Am series driving a Pontiac-Riley Daytona Prototype for the Howard-Boss Motorsports team. Duno joined the SAMAX Motorsport team in 2006. For the 2007 24 Hours of Daytona, Duno teamed up with Ryan Dalziel, Darren Manning, and her regular driving partner, Patrick Carpentier; with a second-place finish, Duno became the highest-finishing female in the history of the prestigious race and highest placing Venezuelan driver, eclipsing Ernesto Soto's fifth-place finish in 1982. In the Rolex Sports Car Series, Duno scored three impressive and historical overall wins – twice at Homestead-Miami Speedway and once at Le Circuit Mont-Tremblant in Quebec: With her first Rolex Series won at Miami she became the first woman in history to win overall a major international sports car race in North America, Duno was also the first woman to pilot the fastest car in the series – the Daytona Prototype. During her time competing in the Rolex Series, Duno earned three overall wins, seven podium appearances, ten top-five finishes, and eighteen top-ten finishes.

=== Indy Racing League ===
==== 2007 ====
On March 23, 2007, Duno and her Grand Am Series team, SAMAX Motorsport, sponsored by CITGO, announced that they acquired the equipment to run a 10 race IndyCar series schedule in 2007, including the Indianapolis 500. It was also announced that Duno would no longer run a full schedule in the Grand Am series.

On April 26, 2007, Duno successfully passed her IRL rookie test at Kansas Speedway. When Duno made the field for the Kansas Lottery Indy 300 (also held at Kansas Speedway) on April 29, 2007, it marked the first time in North American open wheel history that three women (Duno, Danica Patrick and Sarah Fisher) ran in the same race. Duno stayed out of trouble after qualifying last in the 21-car field and finished fourteenth.

On May 6, 2007, Duno successfully completed her rookie test for the Indianapolis 500 race. This 91st running of the "Indy 500" was the first where three women were included in the 33-car field. Duno qualified on May 19, and her speed held through Bump Day. Duno was one of two rookie drivers competing in the Race. She crashed out of the race on lap 65 and finished 31st.

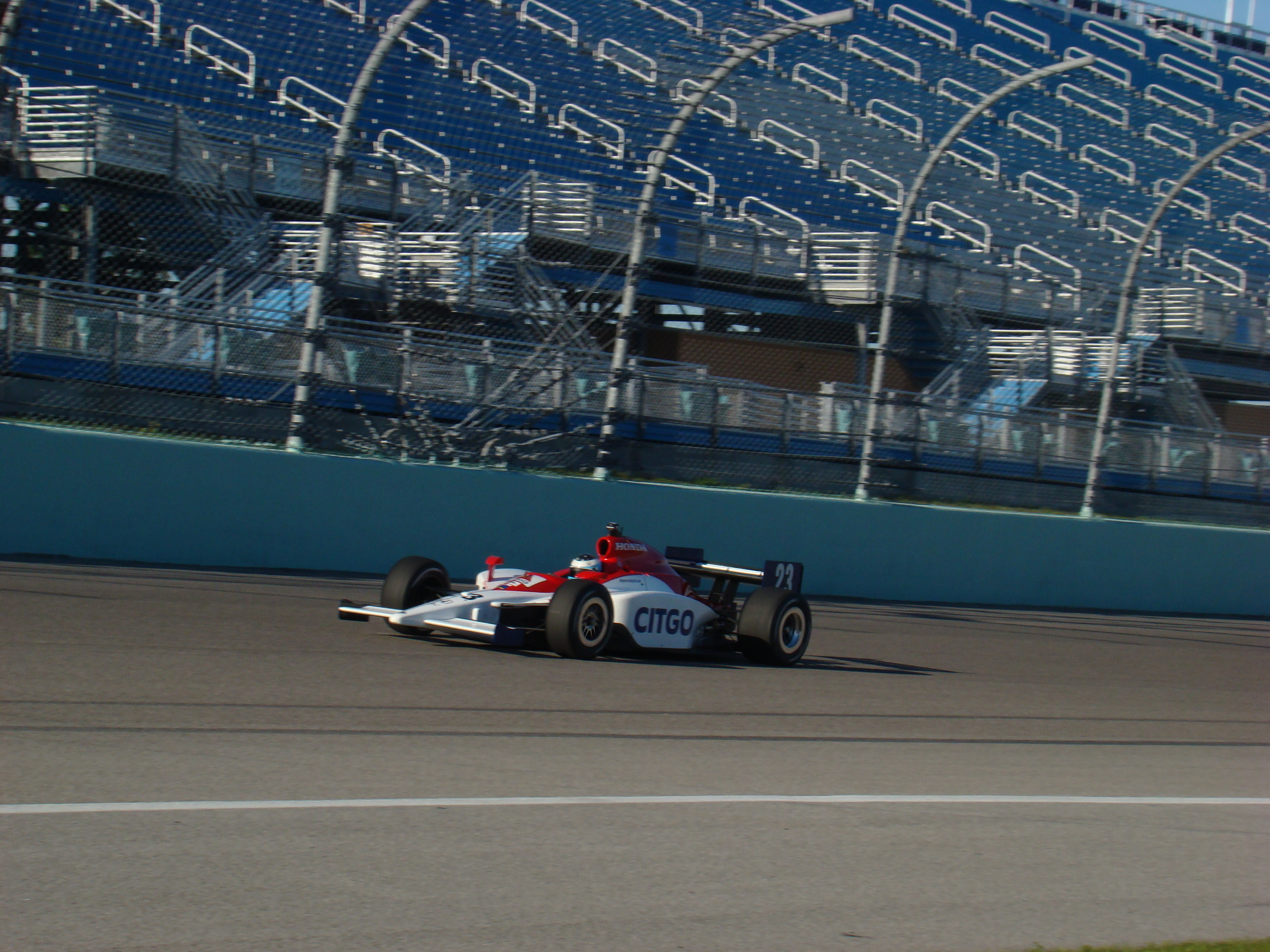
Milka Duno testing at Homestead-Miami Speedway in 2008.

==== 2008 ====
SAMAX chose not to return to the IndyCar Series in 2008. Duno signed with Dreyer & Reinbold Racing for another partial season schedule (eleven races) also sponsored by Citgo. While practicing and racing alongside veteran teammate and former Indy 500 winner Buddy Rice, throughout the season, Duno began to show a bit of improvement. Townsend Bell was signed as the driver of the Dreyer & Reinbold No. 23 during the seven races Duno was not scheduled to drive it.

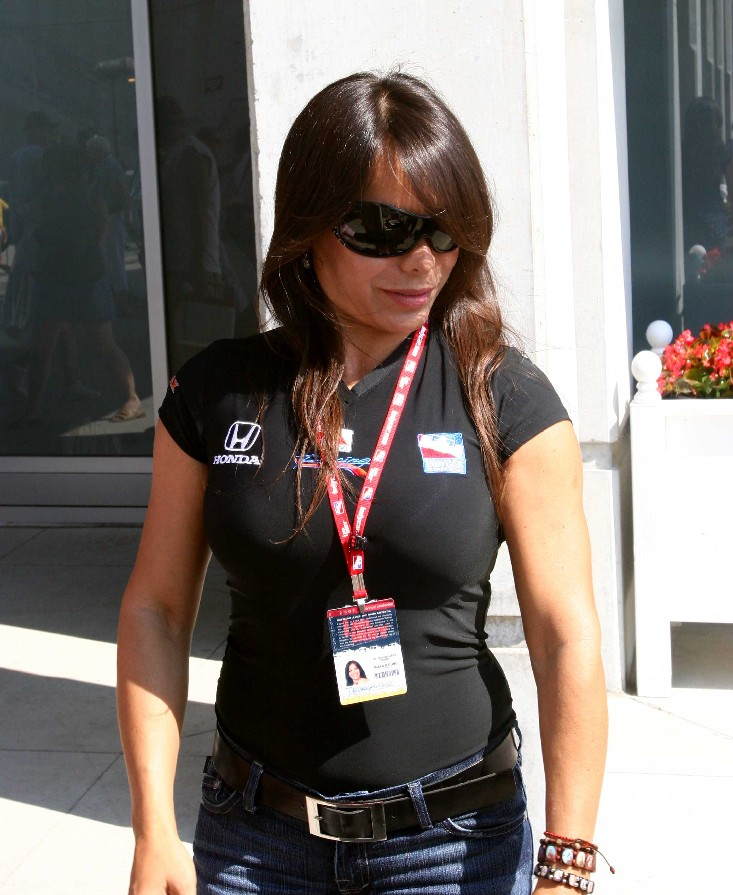
Duno at Indianapolis Motor Speedway on May 12, 2007.

Duno qualified for her second Indianapolis 500 on the second weekend (due to the second day of qualifications being rained out) and finished nineteenth. She was the highest finishing female, as Danica Patrick and Sarah Fisher placed 22nd and 24th, respectively. Although all three women were involved in accidents during the race, Duno was able to reenter the race after her car was moved to the pits, thus making her the only woman running at the end.

==== 2009 ====
Duno returned to Dreyer & Reinbold for the 2009 season driving another part–time schedule (nine races) after driving in the Indy Racing League's pre–season open test at Homestead-Miami Speedway for Newman/Haas/Lanigan Racing. Darren Manning, Tomas Scheckter, and Roger Yasukawa also drove the No. 23 car when Duno was not racing. She had a best finish of sixteenth and finished 24th in points.

Duno was also among a record number of nine women to participate in ARCA testing in December 2009 at Daytona International Speedway.

==== 2010 ====
On March 4, 2010, it was announced that Duno would return to the IRL IndyCar Series driving for Dale Coyne Racing full–time for the 2010 season.

Duno failed to qualify for the 2010 Indianapolis 500. Duno competed in sixteen of seventeen races on the 2010 schedule and the "DNQ" at Indianapolis was the first and only race that she did not qualify for in her 43 race IndyCar Series career.

On Saturday, August 28, 2010, for the first time in history, Duno (along with Danica Patrick, Simona de Silvestro, Ana Beatriz and Sarah Fisher) qualified and ran in an IndyCar Series race that included five women. Duno qualified 26th and finished in nineteenth place.

=== ARCA Racing Series ===
==== 2010 ====
Duno made her stock car debut in the ARCA Racing Series' season-opening event at Daytona International Speedway driving the No. 90 Stringer Motorsports Toyota. She started in 41st place and had picked up ten positions before being swept up in a fourteen-car accident on lap six, ending her day.

==== 2011 ====
Duno signed with Sheltra Motorsports to race in the ARCA Racing Series' season-opening event at Daytona International Speedway. Assigned to the No. 63 Dodge, the announcement was the culmination of several months' work by the team to sign Duno to race in the event.

In winter testing at Daytona in January, Duno was seventh fastest in the first morning of testing, and fifth fastest that afternoon, finishing sixth-fastest overall after the first day's test. For the Lucas Oil Slick Mist 200 at Daytona one month later, Duno qualified 23rd. She had moved up to twelfth place with only sixteen laps to go when Duno was caught up in a nine-car crash that ended her day and relegated her to 31st place.

It was announced on April 14, 2011, that Duno would run the entire 2011 ARCA Racing Series presented by Menards season for Sheltra Motorsports. Over the first five races of the season, Duno had a best starting position of eighth (Talladega) and a best finishing position of fifteenth (Toledo) with two DNF's. Duno was originally awarded the pole position due to qualifying being rained out for the Menards 200 presented by Federated Car Care at Toledo Speedway. Unfortunately, she had to start that race at the back of the field in her backup car due to crashing in the final practice.

Duno's season was then cut short when her car was officially pulled from the entry list eight minutes before the June 3 practice session for the Messina Wildlife Animal Stopper 150 at Chicagoland Speedway due to Sheltra Motorsports's decision to abruptly cease operations. Milka and Sheltra Motorsports resumed ARCA Series competition with the July 16 Prairie Meadows 200 at Iowa Speedway. Despite missing seven races, Duno finished eighteenth in driver points.

In preparation for the 2012 ARCA Series presented by Menards, Duno tested the No. 63 Citgo Lubricants Sheltra Motorsports Ford during the annual ARCA Daytona International Speedway open test from December 16–18, 2011. In the six test sessions held, Duno was the only driver fastest in two of the sessions and was second in a third session.

==== 2012 ====
On February 7, 2012, Duno's entry for the Lucas Oil Slick Mist 200 was officially changed from the No. 63 of Sheltra Motorsports to the No. 33 of Eddie Sharp Racing. Duno ran both the No. 33 and No. 6 of Eddie Sharp Racing in the first five races of the 2012 season logging a qualifying high of sixteenth at Daytona and a high finish of eighteenth at Mobile. She returned to the series when her crew chief at Sheltra & ESR, Dave Leiner Jr. started his own team, Dave Leiner Racing. Duno's first race back was Thunderbolt Raceway at New Jersey Motorsports Park. After qualifying 21st, she finished tenth. This marked her first ARCA top-ten finish, won her the CGS Imaging Hard Charger of the Race award and was the highest place by a Venezuelan driver in ARCA history.

==== 2013 ====
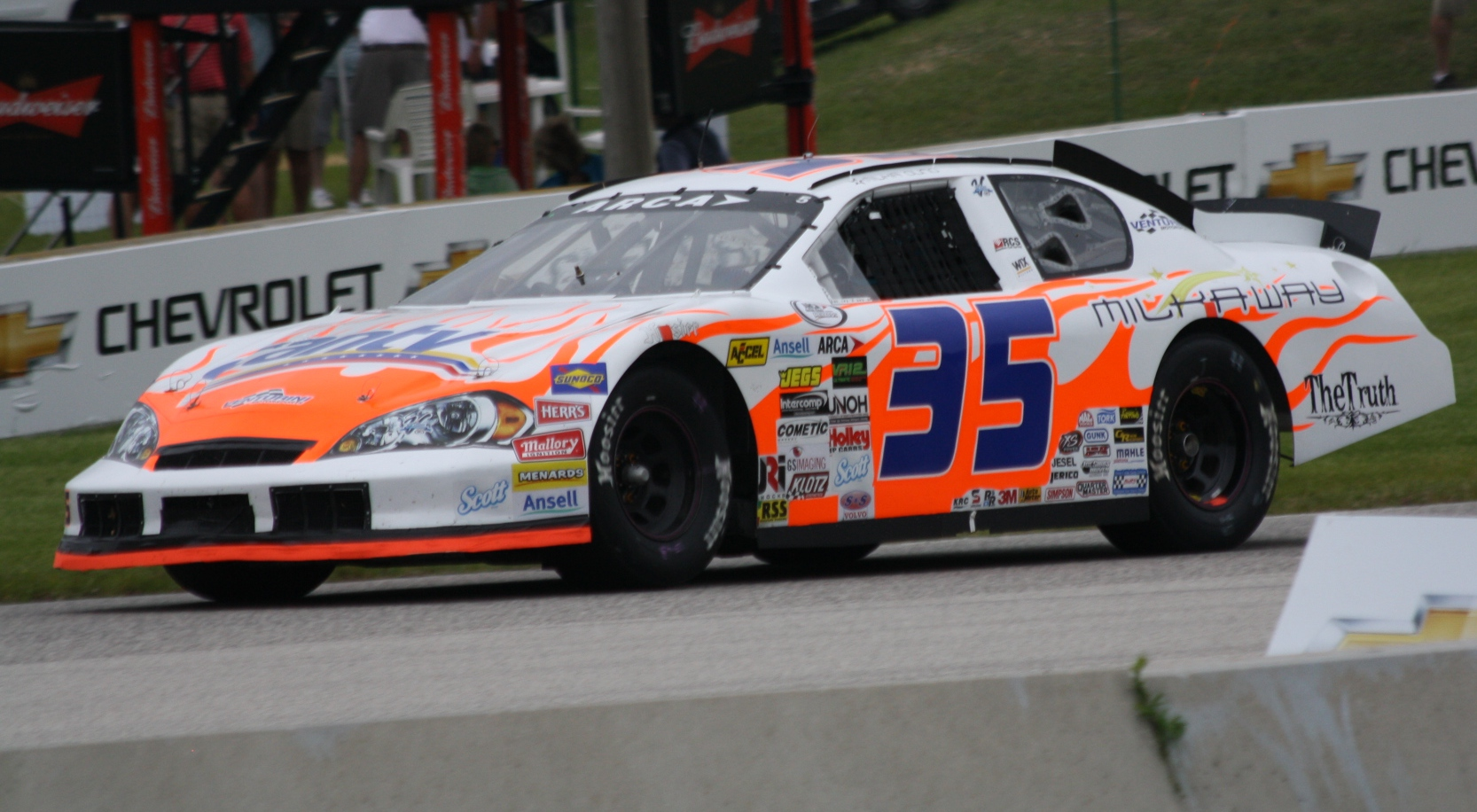
Duno's 2013 ARCA car

In her first full season in the ARCA Racing Series, Duno finished the 2013 season seventh in driver championship standings, becoming the second highest finishing female driver in ARCA's 61-year history. Duno's season highlights include earning the pole at Talladega Superspeedway and leading the first eleven laps at Daytona International Speedway from her outside row one starting position. Her pole at Talladega ranks her as one of only four female drivers to earn pole positions in the ARCA Racing Series. Over 21 races in 2013, Duno earned a career-best eighth-place finish at Salem Speedway and a tenth-place finish at Winchester Speedway. Overall, she earned two top-ten and thirteen top-fifteen finishes. She would also finish the 2013 season third in CGS Imaging Hard Charger points and third in the S&S Volvo Laps Completed points with a total of 2423 laps completed during the season.

=== NASCAR ===
In August 2014, it was announced that Duno had signed with RAB Racing to drive the team's No. 29 Toyota on a limited basis in the NASCAR Nationwide Series. Duno competed in two Nationwide Series races at Kansas Speedway and Homestead-Miami Speedway, crashing out at Kansas and finishing at Homestead. When she qualified for and competed in the race at Kansas, she became the first Hispanic female driver in history to compete in a NASCAR national series in the USA. She also competed in one Camping World Truck Series race, in 2014 she ran MAKE Motorsports' No. 1 truck at Talladega Superspeedway, leading two laps.

== Off–track activities ==
Through the Milka Way Foundation that Duno founded in 2004, she is engaged in programs such as visits to schools in many of the cities she races in to encourage youth of all races to achieve more academically. In 2008, Duno became a movie actress and a published author. Duno played the role of Kellie "Gearbox", a race car driver, in the live-action-from-animated Warner Brothers movie Speed Racer. Duno's bilingual kids book, Go, Milka, Go!, depicted her as an animated character teaching the importance of education. Go, Milka, Go! was awarded the Best Young Adult Sports/Recreation Book of 2009 at the 11th Annual International Latino Book Awards.

== Criticism ==
Duno's IndyCar career was controversial; in a number of instances, she was criticized for running too slow and blocking other drivers.

During the 2007 IndyCar season, Ashley Judd criticized allowing Duno, then a rookie, to race. After the final race, Judd said to reporters, "I know this is not very sportsmanlike, but they've got to get the 23 car (Duno) off the track. It's very dangerous. I'm tired of holding my tongue. She shouldn't be out there. When a car is 10 miles [an hour] off the pace, it's not appropriate to be racing. People's lives are at stake."

In 2008, Duno was confronted by Danica Patrick after an incident at the Mid-Ohio Sports Car Course for being too slow during a practice session. At the Grand Prix of Toronto and at Iowa Speedway in 2010, she was parked by officials due to her lack of speed and was subsequently placed on probation by IndyCar for consistently poor performance.

== Motorsports career results ==
=== Complete American Le Mans Series results ===
American Le Mans Series results
Year	Entrant	Class	Chassis	Engine	Tyres	1	2	3	4	5	6	7	8	9	10	11	12	Rank	Points
2000	Chamberlain Motorsport	GTS	Chrysler Viper GTS-R	Chrysler 8.0L V10	M	SEB	CHA	SIL	NÜR	SON	MOS	TEX	ROS	PET ovr:26 cls:7	MON ovr:15 cls:5	LSV	ADE ovr:8 cls:3	15th	57
2001	Dick Barbour Racing	LMP675	Reynard 01Q	Judd GV675 3.4L V8	G	TEX	SEB	DON	JAR ovr:Ret cls:Ret	SON ovr:13 cls:1	POR ovr:6 cls:1	MOS ovr:19 cls:2	MID ovr:Ret cls:Ret	MON ovr:26 cls:1	PET ovr:7 cls:1			**2nd**	**126**
2002	MBD Sportscar	LMP900	Panoz LMP07	Mugen MF408S 4.0L V8	G	SEB ovr:Ret cls:Ret	SON ovr:10 cls:7	MID ovr:8 cls:6	AME ovr:Ret cls:Ret									12th	106
2002	Intersport	LMP900	Lola B2K/10B	Judd GV4 4.0L V10	G					WAS ovr:25 cls:8	TRO	MOS						12th	106
2002	Chamberlain	LMP900	Dome S101	Judd GV4 4.0L V10	G								MON ovr:12 cls:8	MIA ovr:Ret cls:Ret	PET ovr:35 cls:10			12th	106
2004	Taurus Racing	LMP1	Lola B2K/10	Judd GV4 4.0L V10	D	SEB ovr:22 cls:9	MID	LIM	SON	POR	MOS	AME						27th	8
2004	Intersport Racing	LMP2	Lola B2K/40	Judd KV675 3.4L V8	P								PET ovr:6 cls:1	MON				13th	26

=== Complete 24 Hours of Daytona results ===
Year	Team	Co-drivers	Car	Class	Laps	Pos.	Class Pos.
2001	(United Kingdom) Chamberlain Motorsports	(United Kingdom) David Gooding (Italy) Raffaele Sangiuolo (Italy) Stefano Zonca	Dodge Viper GTS-R	GTS	530	31st	6th
2004	(United States) Spirit of Daytona Racing	(United States) Doug Goad (United States) Robby Gordon (France) Stéphane Grégoire	Crawford-Pontiac DP03	DP	401	35th	9th
2005	(United States) Howard-Boss Motorsports	(United Kingdom) Dario Franchitti (United Kingdom) Marino Franchitti (United Kingdom) Dan Wheldon	Crawford-Pontiac DP03	DP	528	DNF	DNF
2006	(United States) CITGO Racing/SAMAX Motorsport	(United Kingdom) Dario Franchitti (United Kingdom) Marino Franchitti (United Kingdom) Kevin McGarrity	Riley-Pontiac Mk XI	DP	695	8th	8th
2007	(United States) SAMAX Motorsport	(Canada) Patrick Carpentier (United Kingdom) Ryan Dalziel (United Kingdom) Darren Manning	Riley-Pontiac Mk XI	DP	668	**2nd**	**2nd**
2008	(United States) SAMAX Motorsport	(United Kingdom) Ryan Dalziel (Czech Republic) Tomáš Enge (Switzerland) Harold Primat	Riley-Pontiac Mk XI	DP	97	DNF	DNF

=== Complete 24 Hours of Le Mans results ===
24 Hours of Le Mans results
Year	Class	No	Tyres	Car	Team	Co-Drivers	Laps	Pos.	Class Pos.
2001	LMP675	37	**G**	Reynard 01Q-LM; Judd GV675 3.4L V8	(United States) Dick Barbour Racing	(Canada) John Graham (United States) David Murry	4	DNF	DNF
2002	LMP900	19	**A**	Panoz LMP07; Mugen MF408S 4.0L V8	(United States) MBD Sportscar Team	(Belgium) Didier de Radiguès (Canada) John Graham	259	DNF	DNF

=== Complete Euro Open by Nissan/Nissan World Series Lights results ===
(key)

World Series by Nissan results
Year	Entrant	1	2	3	4	5	6	7	8	9	10	11	12	13	14	15	16	17	18	DC	Points
2001	Vergani Racing	JAR; 1 Ret	JAR; 2; 19	EST; 1; 16	EST; 2; 18	ALB; 1; 14	ALB; 2; 15	VAL; 1 Ret	VAL; 2; 17	MNZ; 1; 13	MNZ; 2 Ret	MAG; 1 Ret	MAG; 2; 13	BAR; 1; 14	BAR; 2; 13	VAL; 1; 10	VAL; 2; 12			27th	1
2002	Vergani Racing	VAL; 1; 11	VAL; 2; 11	JAR; 1; 11	JAR; 2; 10	ALB; 1 Ret	ALB; 2; 12	MNZ; 1	MNZ; 2	MAG; 1; 11	MAG; 2; 11	CAT; 1; 12	CAT; 2; 13	VAL; 1; 11	VAL; 2; 11					18th	1
2003	Vergani Racing	MNZ; 1; 9	MNZ; 2; 11	LAU; 1; 6	LAU; 2; 9	MAG; 1; 9	MAG; 2; 9	A1R; 1; 11	A1R; 2 Ret	CAT; 1; 10	CAT; 2; 11	VAL; 1; 5	VAL; 2; 9	ALB; 1; 12	ALB; 2; 11	JAR; 1; 9	JAR; 2; 10			11th	28

=== Complete World Series by Nissan results ===
(key)

World Series Lights results
Year	Entrant	1	2	3	4	5	6	7	8	9	10	11	12	13	14	15	16	17	18	DC	Points
2002	Vergani Racing	VAL; 1	VAL; 2	JAR; 1	JAR; 2	ALB; 1	ALB; 2	MNZ; 1	MNZ; 2	MAG; 1	MAG; 2	BAR; 1	BAR; 2	VAL; 1	VAL; 2	CUR; 1; 16	CUR; 2; 16	INT; 1 DNS	INT; 2; 12	28th	0

=== American Open-Wheel racing results ===
(key) (Races in bold indicate pole position, races in italics indicate fastest race lap)

==== Barber Dodge Pro Series ====
Barber Dodge Pro Series results
Year	1	2	3	4	5	6	7	8	9	10	11	12	Rank	Points
2000	SEB; 24	MIA; 24	NAZ; 20	LRP; 17	DET; 20	CLE; 21	MOH; 24	ROA; 22	VAN	LS	RAT	HMS	**34th**	-

==== IndyCar ====
Year	Team	No.	Chassis	Engine	1	2	3	4	5	6	7	8	9	10	11	12	13	14	15	16	17	18	19	Rank	Points	Ref
2007	SAMAX Motorsport	23	Dallara IR-05	Honda	HMS	STP	MOT	KAN; 14	INDY; 31	MIL	TXS; 11	IOW; 18	RIR; 19	WGL	NSH	MOH	MIS; 19	KTY	SNM	DET	CHI; 15			20th	96	
2008	Dreyer & Reinbold Racing	23	Dallara IR-05	Honda	HMS; 20	STP	MOT^{1}	LBH^{1}	KAN; 16	INDY; 19	MIL	TXS; 17	IOW; 24	RIR	WGL; 20	NSH; 17	MOH; 23	EDM	KTY; 21	SNM	DET; 23	CHI; 14	SRF^{2}	25th	140	
2009	Dreyer & Reinbold Racing	23	Dallara IR-05	Honda	STP	LBH	KAN; 16	INDY; 20	MIL	TXS; 23	IOW	RIR	WGL; 17	TOR	EDM	KTY; 20	MOH; 21	SNM; 17	CHI; 21	MOT	HMS; 17			24th	113	
2010	Dale Coyne Racing	18	Dallara IR-05	Honda	SAO; 21	STP; 24	ALA; 24	LBH; 25	KAN; 24	INDY; DNQ	TXS; 23	IOW; 23	WGL; 23	TOR; 26	EDM; 25	MOH; 23	SNM; 22	CHI; 19	KTY; 19	MOT; 19	HMS; 24			23rd	184	

^{1} Run on same day.
^{2} Non-points paying, exhibition race.

Years	Teams	Races	Poles	Wins	Podiums (Non-win)	Top 10s (Non-podium)	Indianapolis 500 Wins	Championships
4	3	43	0	0	0	0	0	0

==== Indianapolis 500 ====
Year	Chassis	Engine	Start	Finish	Team
2007	Dallara IR-05	Honda HI7R V8	29	31	SAMAX Motorsport
2008	Dallara IR-05	Honda HI7R V8	27	19	Dreyer & Reinbold Racing
2009	Dallara IR-05	Honda HI7R V8	30	20	Dreyer & Reinbold Racing
2010	Dallara IR-05	Honda HI7R V8	DNQ		Dale Coyne Racing

=== NASCAR ===
(key) (Bold – Pole position awarded by qualifying time. Italics – Pole position earned by points standings or practice time. * – Most laps led.)

==== Nationwide Series ====
NASCAR Nationwide Series results
Year	Team	No.	Make	1	2	3	4	5	6	7	8	9	10	11	12	13	14	15	16	17	18	19	20	21	22	23	24	25	26	27	28	29	30	31	32	33	NNSC	Pts	Ref
2014	RAB Racing	29	Toyota	DAY	PHO	LVS	BRI	CAL	TEX	DAR	RCH	TAL	IOW	CLT	DOV	MCH	ROA	KEN	DAY	NHA	CHI	IND	IOW	GLN	MOH	BRI; DNQ	ATL	RCH	CHI	KEN	DOV; DNQ	KAN; 40	CLT	TEX	PHO		74th	14	
2014	RAB Racing	87	Toyota																																	HOM; 34	74th	14	

==== Camping World Truck Series ====
NASCAR Camping World Truck Series results
Year	Team	No.	Make	1	2	3	4	5	6	7	8	9	10	11	12	13	14	15	16	17	18	19	20	21	22	NCWTC	Pts	Ref
2014	MAKE Motorsports	1	Chevy	DAY	MAR	KAN	CLT	DOV	TEX	GTW	KEN	IOW	ELD	POC	MCH	BRI	MSP	CHI	NHA	LVS	TAL; 25	MAR	TEX	PHO	HOM	103rd	0^{1}	

==== K&N Pro Series East ====
NASCAR K&N Pro Series East results
Year	Team	No.	Make	1	2	3	4	5	6	7	8	9	10	11	12	13	14	15	16	NKNPSEC	Pts	Ref
2014	RAB Racing	18	Toyota	NSM	DAY	BRI	GRE	RCH	IOW	BGS	FIF	LGY	NHA	COL	IOW	GLN	VIR	GRE	DOV; 20	61st	24	

^{*} Season still in progress
^{1} Ineligible for series points

=== ARCA Racing Series ===
(key) (Bold – Pole position awarded by qualifying time. Italics – Pole position earned by points standings or practice time. * – Most laps led.)

ARCA Racing Series results
Year	Team	No.	Make	1	2	3	4	5	6	7	8	9	10	11	12	13	14	15	16	17	18	19	20	21	ARSC	Pts	Ref
2010	Stringer Motorsports	90	Toyota	DAY; 43	PBE	SLM	TEX	TAL	TOL	POC	MCH	IOW	MFD	POC	BLN	NJE	ISF	CHI	DSF	TOL	SLM	KAN	CAR		140th	30	
2011	Sheltra Motorsports	63	Dodge	DAY; 31		SLM; 17									IRP; 19					SLM; 20		TOL; 18			18th	1780	
2011	Sheltra Motorsports	63	Toyota		TAL; 19									IOW; 23		POC; 25	ISF				KAN; 19				18th	1780	
2011	Sheltra Motorsports	63	Chevy				TOL; 15	NJE; 22	CHI	POC	MCH	WIN	BLN					MAD; 18	DSF						18th	1780	
2012	Eddie Sharp Racing	33	Chevy	DAY; 37																					19th	1790	
2012	Eddie Sharp Racing	6	Chevy		MOB; 18	SLM; 31	TAL; 37																		19th	1790	
2012	Eddie Sharp Racing	6	Toyota					TOL; 24	ELK	POC	MCH	WIN													19th	1790	
2012	David Leiner	94	Toyota										NJE; 10	IOW; 16	CHI; 18	IRP; 17	POC; 19	BLN	ISF	MAD; 17	SLM; 13	DSF; C	KAN; 33		19th	1790	
2013	Venturini Motorsports	35	Toyota	DAY; 28		SLM; 8	**TAL**; 29	TOL; 13		POC; 14	MCH; 11		WIN; 10	CHI; 15	NJE; 21	POC; 21	BLN; 15	ISF; 21	MAD; 12	DSF; 16	IOW; 19	SLM; 13	KEN; 23	KAN; 15	7th	4405	
2013	Venturini Motorsports	35	Chevy		MOB; 13				ELK; 13			ROA; 12													7th	4405	
