= Roger Yasukawa =

Japanese-American auto racing driver

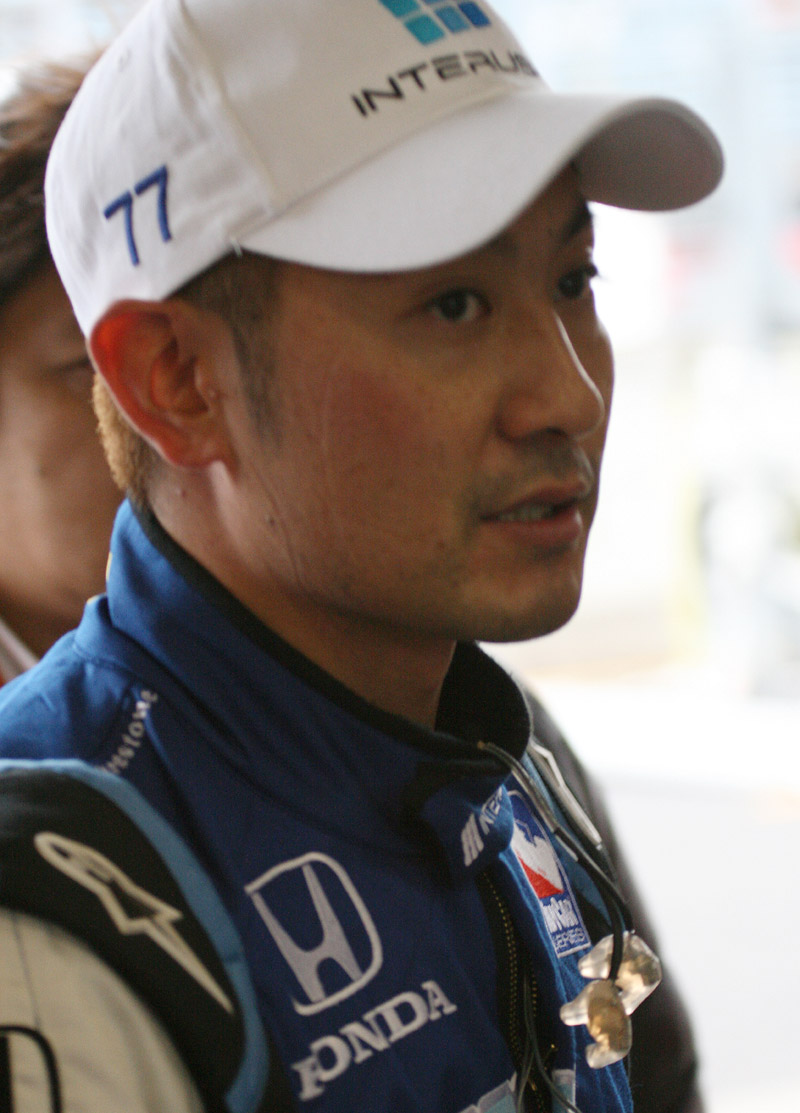
- Yasukawa in 2008
- Nationality: (Japan) Japanese (after 2003) (United States) American (before 2003)
- Born: October 10, 1977 (age 49) Los Angeles, California, U.S.
- Relatives: Minoru Yasukawa, worked for McLaren and Leyton House F1 teams.

IRL IndyCar Series career
- Debut season: 2003
- Current team: Conquest Racing
- Car number: 36
- Former teams: Super Aguri Fernandez Racing; Rahal Letterman Racing; Playa Del Racing; Dreyer & Reinbold Racing; CURB/Agajanian/Beck Motorsports
- Starts: 40
- Wins: 0
- Poles: 0
- Best finish: 12th in 2003

Previous series
- 2002 2000-2001 1999 1998 1997: Toyota Atlantic Championship; Barber Dodge Pro Series; Formula Palmer Audi; Skip Barber Formula Dodge; Formula Vauxhall Junior

Roger Yasukawa (Japanese: ロジャー安川, Hepburn: Roja Yasukawa; born October 10, 1977) is an American-born Japanese former auto racing driver. He was born in Los Angeles, California, but holds Japanese citizenship.

Yasukawa started karting in Southern California, winning the California State Championship in 1991 in Junior Sportsman. He then moved to Italy to compete in JICA. He moved to car racing in 1997 in the Formula Vauxhall Junior Championship in England, before winning the West Coast Skip Barber Formula Dodge 2-Liter Championship in 1998. He moved back to the UK to compete in the inaugural Formula Palmer Audi Championship, before driving several years in the Barber Dodge Pro Series before moving up to the Toyota Atlantic championship in 2002 as a teammate to Ryan Hunter-Reay. He finished tenth in points.

Yasukawa signed to drive for former Formula One driver Aguri Suzuki's new Indy Racing League team in 2003. He was second to future series champion Dan Wheldon in the rookie-of-the-year standings and twelfth overall, with eight top-ten finishes. He ran only two races for Rahal Letterman Racing in 2004 but finished tenth both times. He struggled on a return to a full-time seat in 2005 for the underfunded Dreyer & Reinbold Racing.

Yasukawa has only made occasional IRL appearances since 2006. He drove in the 2006 Indianapolis 500 for Playa Del Racing and finished sixteenth. He was a late entry for the 2007 event, running in Dreyer and Reinbold's third car, alongside 2004 Indianapolis 500 champion Buddy Rice and Sarah Fisher. In 2008, he contested the Motegi round as well as the 2008 Indianapolis 500, for Beck Motorsports, however he failed to qualify for Indy.

In 2007, Yasukawa drove the No. 11 SAMAX Motorsport Daytona Prototype at Infineon Raceway, finishing seventeenth.

Yasukawa currently works in driver management, representing drivers both in the United States and Japan. He was instrumental in bringing Spaniard Álex Palou to IndyCar from Japan and secured a deal between Team Goh and Dale Coyne Racing for Palou to debut in the IndyCar series. Yasukawa was then able to secure Palou a drive with Chip Ganassi Racing the following year, which helped Palou become a title contender and eventual champion of the 2021 IndyCar Series.

== Motorsports Career Results ==
=== American open–wheel racing results ===
(key)

==== Barber Dodge Pro Series ====
Year	1	2	3	4	5	6	7	8	9	10	11	12	Rank	Points
1999	SEB; 10	NAZ; 11	LRP; 15	POR; 11	CLE; 10	ROA; 11	DET; 6	MOH; 7	GRA; 6	LS; 6	HMS; 6	WGI; 6	9th	81
2000	SEB; 4	MIA; 25	NAZ; 5	LRP; 11	DET; 5	CLE; 5	MOH; 8	ROA; 4	VAN; 11	LS; 25	RAT; 5	HMS; 8	7th	94
2001	SEB; 4	PIR; 7	LRP1; 3	LRP2; 10	DET; 2	CLE; 6	TOR; 4	CHI; 8	MOH; 5	ROA; 2	VAN; 1	LS	4th	128

==== Atlantic Championship ====
Year	Team	1	2	3	4	5	6	7	8	9	10	11	12	Rank	Points
2002	Hylton Motorsports	MTY	LBH; 7	MIL; 1	LS; 3	POR; 8	CHI; 2	TOR; Ret	CLE; 21	TRR; Ret	ROA; 10	MTL	DEN	10th	73

==== IndyCar Series ====
Year	Team	No.	Chassis	Engine	1	2	3	4	5	6	7	8	9	10	11	12	13	14	15	16	17	18	Rank	Points	Ref
2003	Fernandez Racing Super Aguri	55	Dallara IR-03	Honda HI3R V8	HMS; 14	PHX; 17	MOT; 21	INDY; 10	TXS; 9	PPI; 17	RIR; 11	KAN; 7	NSH; 15	MIS; 8	STL; 18	KTY; 12	NZR; 8	CHI; 8	CAL; 7	TX2; 10			12th	301	
2004	Rahal Letterman Racing	16	G-Force GF09B	Honda HI4R V8	HMS	PHX	MOT; 11	INDY; 10	TXS	RIR	KAN	NSH	MIL	MIS	KTY	PPI	NZR	CHI	CAL	TX2			26th	39	
2005	Dreyer & Reinbold Racing	24	Dallara IR-05	Honda HI5R V8	HMS; 17	PHX; 18	STP; 11	MOT; 18	INDY; 18	TXS; 15	RIR; 16	KAN; 22	NSH; 11	MIL; 15	MIS; 18	KTY; 17	PPI; 15	SNM; 11	CHI; 15	WGL; 15	CAL; 16		17th	246	
2006	Playa Del Racing	12	Panoz GF09C	Honda HI6R V8	HMS	STP	MOT	INDY; 16	WGL	TXS	RIR	KAN	NSH	MIL	MIS	KTY	SNM	CHI					28th	14	
2007	Dreyer & Reinbold Racing	24	Dallara IR-05	Honda HI7R V8	HMS	STP	MOT	KAN	INDY; 21	MIL	TXS	IOW	RIR	WGL	NSH	MOH	MIS	KTY	SNM	DET	CHI		30th	12	
2008	CURB/Agajanian/Beck Motorsports	77	Dallara IR-05	Honda HI7R V8	HMS	STP	MOT^{1} 14	LBH^{1} DNP	KAN	INDY; DNQ	MIL	TXS	IOW	RIR	WGL	NSH	MOH	EDM	KTY	SNM	DET	CHI	35th	16	
2009	Dreyer & Reinbold Racing	43	Dallara IR-05	Honda HI7R V8	STP	LBH	KAN	INDY	MIL	TXS	IOW	RIR	WGL	TOR	EDM	KTY	MOH	SNM	CHI	MOT; 20	HMS		39th	12	
2010	Conquest Racing	36	Dallara IR-05	Honda HI7R V8	SAO	STP	ALA	LBH	KAN	INDY	TXS	IOW	WGL	TOR	EDM	MOH	SNM	CHI	KTY	MOT; 20	HMS		40th	12	

^{1} Run on same day.

Years	Teams	Races	Poles	Wins	Podiums (Non-win)	Top 10s (Non-podium)	Indianapolis 500 Wins	Championships
8	6	41	0	0	0	9	0	0

=== Indianapolis 500 results ===
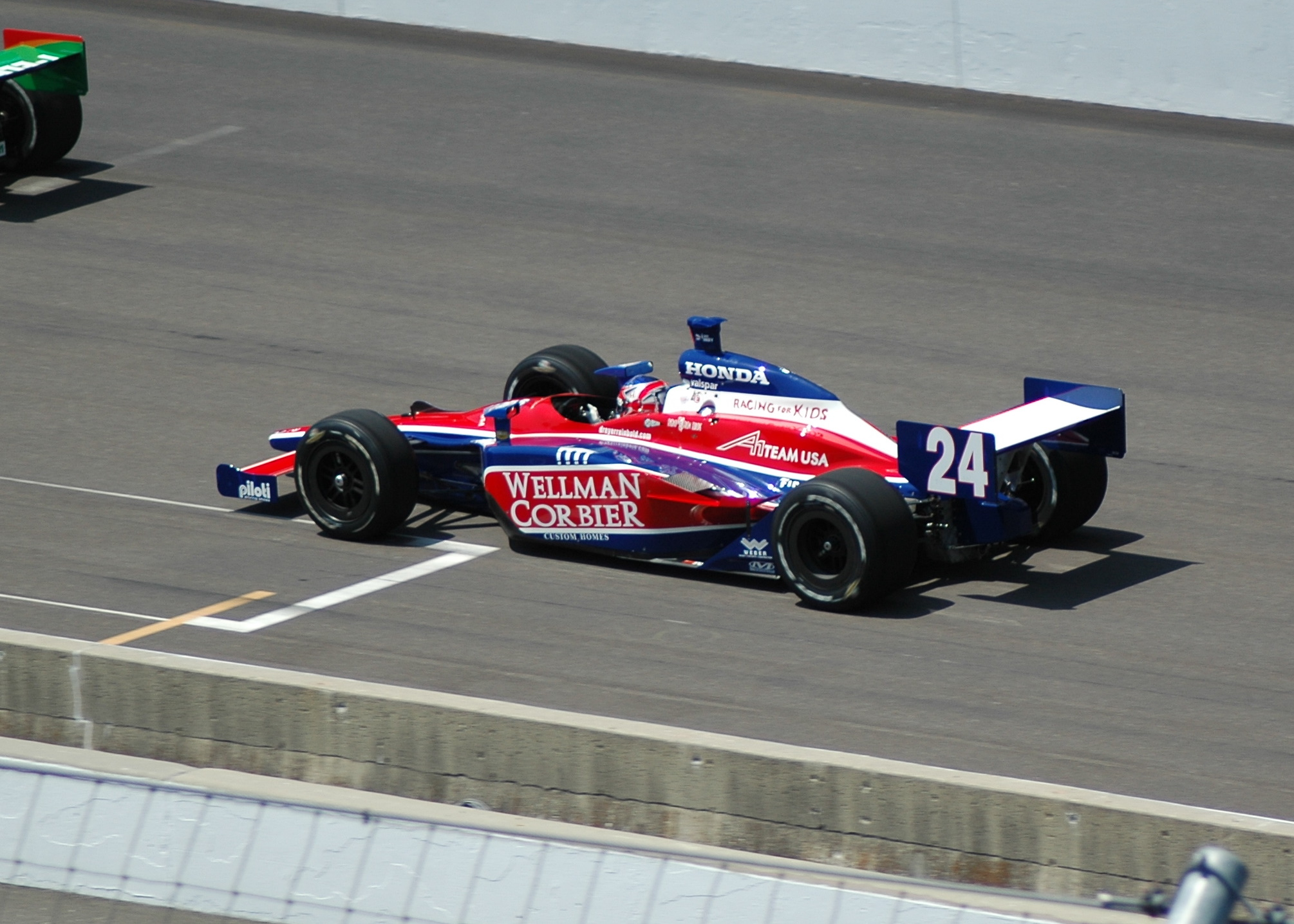
Practicing for the 2007 Indianapolis 500.

Year	Chassis	Engine	Start	Finish	Team
2003	Dallara	Honda	11th	10th	Fernández
2004	G-Force	Honda	12th	10th	Rahal Letterman
2005	Dallara	Honda	17th	18th	Dreyer & Reinbold
2006	Panoz	Honda	28th	16th	Playa Del
2007	Dallara	Honda	23rd	21st	Dreyer & Reinbold
2008	Dallara	Honda	Failed to Qualify		Beck
