= 2007 Peak Antifreeze Indy 300 =

Motor race held in Chicago, Illinois

(United States) 2007 Peak Antifreeze Indy 300
Race details
- Race 17 of 17 in the 2007 IndyCar Series season
- Layout of Chicagoland Speedway
- Date: September 9, 2007
- Official name: Peak Antifreeze Indy 300 presented by Mr. Clean
- Location: Chicagoland Speedway, Joliet, Illinois
- Course: Permanent racing facility 1.500 mi / 2.414 km
- Distance: 200 laps 300.000 mi / 482.803 km
- Weather: Sunny, dry

Pole position
- Driver: (United Kingdom) Dario Franchitti (Andretti Green Racing)
- Time: 25.4931

Fastest lap
- Driver: (Japan) Hideki Mutoh (Panther Racing)
- Time: 25.2578 (on lap 173 of 200)

Podium
- First: (United Kingdom) Dario Franchitti (Andretti Green Racing)
- Second: (New Zealand) Scott Dixon (Chip Ganassi Racing)
- Third: (United States) Sam Hornish Jr. (Team Penske)

The 2007 Peak Antifreeze Indy 300 presented by Mr. Clean was an IndyCar Series motor race that was held on September 9, 2007 at Chicagoland Speedway in Joliet, Illinois. It was the 17th and final round of the 2007 IndyCar Series and the seventh running of the event. Dario Franchitti of the Andretti Green Racing team won the 200-lap race from the pole position. Chip Ganassi Racing driver Scott Dixon finished second and Sam Hornish Jr. came in third for Team Penske.

Before the race, Franchitti, Dixon, and Tony Kanaan all had a chance to win the Drivers' Championship. Franchitti earned the pole by recording the fastest lap time of qualifying, but quickly lost the lead to Hornish on the first lap. He and his teammate Hélio Castroneves dominated the majority of the race before a lengthy caution flag on lap 137 gave Franchitti and Dixon the opportunity to top off on their fuel supply without having to make another pit stop. This strategy benefitted them when another caution was issued on lap 195, allowing the two racers to gain a full lap advantage over the other competitors. On the final lap, Dixon's car ran out of fuel as he was leading in turn three, and Franchitti overtook him to claim the eighth victory of his career.

There were three cautions and 13 lead changes among five drivers during the race. The race result won Franchitti his first Drivers' Championship and the third title for Andretti Green Racing, a record-high for the series. Kanaan failed to challenge Franchitti or Dixon for the title because of an unplanned pit stop early in the race and remained third in the standings, ahead of fourth-place Dan Wheldon and fifth-place Hornish in what wound up being his final race in the series.

== Background ==
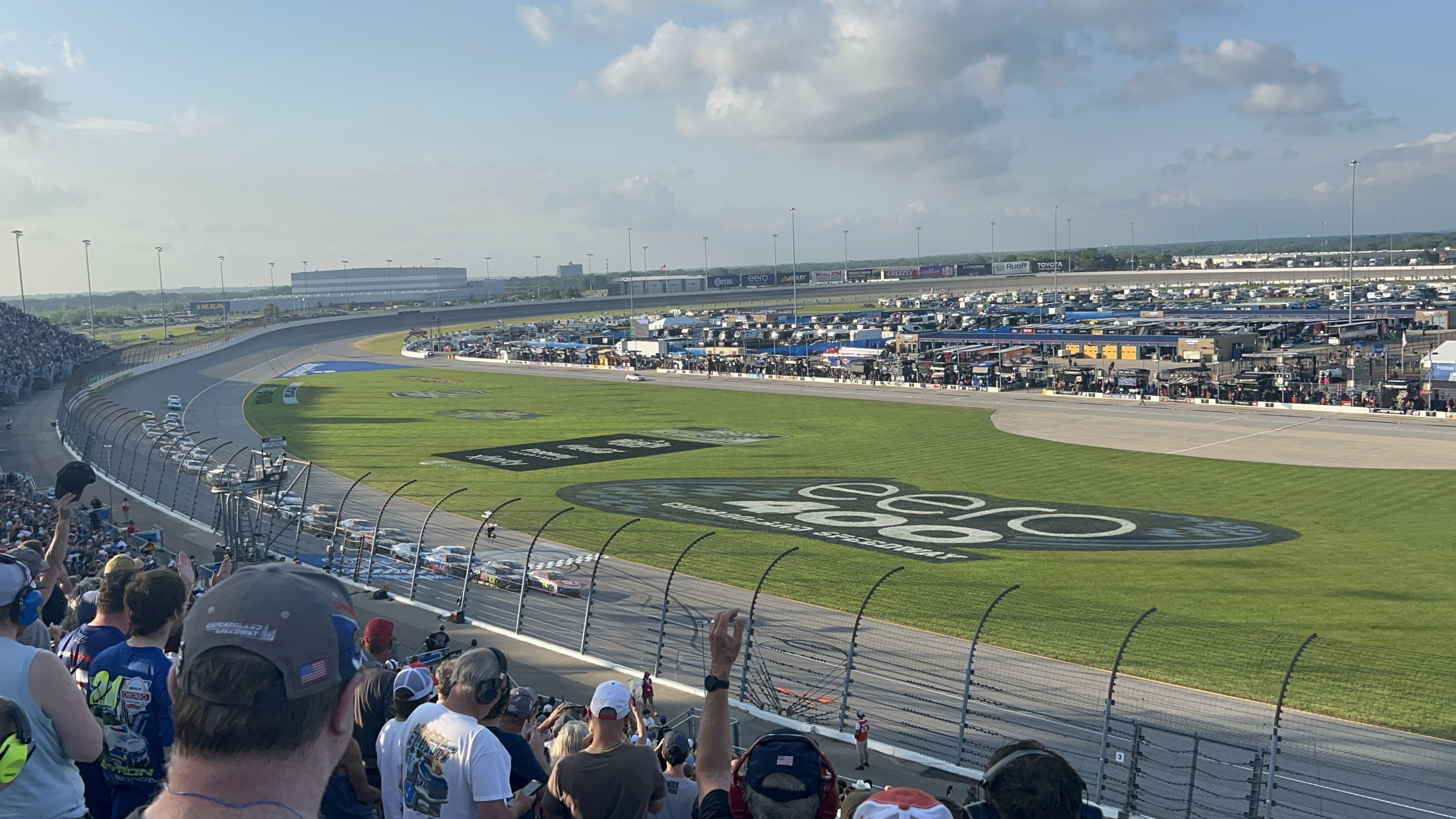
Chicagoland Speedway (pictured in 2026), where the race was held.

The 2007 Peak Antifreeze Indy 300 was the 17th and final round of the 2007 IndyCar Series and the seventh consecutive year that the event was included on the IndyCar Series schedule dating back to 2001. It was held at Chicagoland Speedway, a 1.5 mi (2.4 km) D-shaped asphalt tri-oval race track, in Joliet, Illinois on Sunday, September 9, 2007, over a scheduled distance of 200 laps and 300 miles (480 km). Dan Wheldon was the defending race winner from the 2005 and 2006 editions.

Heading into the race, Dario Franchitti held the Drivers' Championship lead with 587 points, three more than Scott Dixon and 39 more than Tony Kanaan. Because the race offered a maximum of 53 points, Franchitti, Dixon, and Kanaan were the only drivers who had a mathematical chance of winning the title. Franchitti and Dixon needed to win the race in order to clinch the championship; Kanaan had to win the race, lead the most laps, and have Franchitti finish no higher than 13th and Dixon no better than 16th. Behind them, Wheldon held fourth place with 449 points, and Sam Hornish Jr. had fifth on 427.

Franchitti, who lost the 1999 CART championship to Juan Pablo Montoya on a tiebreaker, held a 65-point advantage over Dixon after the SunTrust Indy Challenge race in June, but Dixon's three-race winning streak and Franchitti's numerous crashes allowed Dixon to take the championship lead following the Motorola Indy 300 in August. Franchitti regained the lead in the season's penultimate round, the Detroit Indy Grand Prix, but only after a last-lap collision with Dixon which drew outrage from Franchitti's team owner Michael Andretti. Franchitti recognized the competitive nature of his and Kanaan's team, Andretti Green Racing, and Dixon's team, Chip Ganassi Racing, but remained determined to "win the race or try to be up front and do the best we can to beat Dixon." Dixon felt that his win streak did not provide him with a major advantage over Franchitti because he "seemed to be finishing right behind us," but assured that his team would put up a good fight at Chicagoland. Kanaan similarly stated that he and his team "have nothing to lose so we're going to go out and go for it."

A total of 22 cars were entered for the race, all of which used Dallara IR-05 chassis, Honda Indy V8 engines, and Firestone tires. After completing a rookie test at Chicagoland Speedway on August 16, Indy Pro Series (IPS) driver Hideki Mutoh was hired to drive a third entry for Panther Racing in what was his IndyCar Series debut. He expressed confidence that he could perform well because of his win in the IPS race at Kentucky Speedway in August, which was his first victory on an oval track. Marty Roth, who had not competed in the series since that year's Indianapolis 500, fielded two cars from his Roth Racing team. The second entry was initially reserved for the 2007 IPS champion, who wound up being Alex Lloyd, but a scheduling conflict led to P. J. Chesson attaining the seat, his first start since the 2006 Indianapolis 500.

== Practice and qualifying ==
One day before the race, two practice sessions were held at Chicagoland Speedway, the first lasting for 105 minutes and the second 60 minutes. The racers were split into two groups for the second session, with each being allotted equal track time. Dixon was fastest in the first practice session on Saturday morning with a lap time of 25.1725 seconds, ahead of Hornish, Kanaan, Franchitti, and Wheldon. The session was briefly halted for Buddy Rice, whose car ran out of fuel in turn three. Milka Duno was forced to miss most of the session because her spotter was not at the spotter stand, as did Castroneves because his team had to remove his engine to repair a broken O-ring; he resultantly received an extra ten minutes of track time for the second practice session, which he led with a 25.3097 second-lap. He was followed by Dixon, Franchitti, Kanaan, and Marco Andretti.

The qualifying session on Saturday afternoon set the starting grid for the race. Each driver was required to go on track individually and complete two timed laps, the faster of which would determine their starting position. Franchitti earned the pole position with a time of 25.4931 seconds, his third pole of the season and his sixth in the IndyCar Series. Hornish joined him on the front row of the grid with a lap that was less than two hundredths of a second slower. Castroneves started third, Kanaan fourth, and Wheldon fifth, with Dixon, Danica Patrick, Darren Manning, Tomas Scheckter, and Andretti completing the top-ten. Scott Sharp, in 11th, only completed one lap in his qualifying attempt because his team hoped to gain an advantage by pulling him out of line in order to qualify last on a cooling track surface. Ryan Hunter-Reay, Mutoh, Ed Carpenter, Vítor Meira, Kosuke Matsuura, Sarah Fisher, A. J. Foyt IV, Rice, Chesson, Roth, and Duno took the last 11 positions. After qualifying, Franchitti spoke positively of his car: "First run already I knew the Canadian Club car was very fast, which is something I haven't had here at Chicago before. And it's a big part of running up front here, just getting a good car, very good balance in the car. The speed was there as well."

=== Qualifying classification ===
Final qualifying results
| Pos | No. | Driver | Team | Time | Speed | Grid |
|---|---|---|---|---|---|---|
| 1 | 27 | (United Kingdom) Dario Franchitti | Andretti Green Racing | 25.4931 | 214.646 | 1 |
| 2 | 6 | (United States) Sam Hornish Jr. | Team Penske | 25.5115 | 214.492 | 2 |
| 3 | 3 | (Brazil) Hélio Castroneves | Team Penske | 25.5248 | 214.380 | 3 |
| 4 | 11 | (Brazil) Tony Kanaan | Andretti Green Racing | 25.5331 | 214.310 | 4 |
| 5 | 10 | (United Kingdom) Dan Wheldon | Chip Ganassi Racing | 25.5407 | 214.246 | 5 |
| 6 | 9 | (New Zealand) Scott Dixon | Chip Ganassi Racing | 25.5442 | 214.217 | 6 |
| 7 | 7 | (United States) Danica Patrick | Andretti Green Racing | 25.5925 | 213.813 | 7 |
| 8 | 14 | (United Kingdom) Darren Manning | A. J. Foyt Enterprises | 25.6900 | 213.001 | 8 |
| 9 | 2 | (South Africa) Tomas Scheckter | Vision Racing | 25.6995 | 212.922 | 9 |
| 10 | 26 | (United States) Marco Andretti | Andretti Green Racing | 25.7031 | 212.893 | 10 |
| 11 | 8 | (United States) Scott Sharp | Rahal Letterman Racing | 25.7095 | 212.840 | 11 |
| 12 | 17 | (United States) Ryan Hunter-Reay | Rahal Letterman Racing | 25.7566 | 212.450 | 12 |
| 13 | 60 | (Japan) Hideki Mutoh | Panther Racing | 25.7829 | 212.234 | 13 |
| 14 | 20 | (United States) Ed Carpenter | Vision Racing | 25.8297 | 211.849 | 14 |
| 15 | 4 | (Brazil) Vítor Meira | Panther Racing | 25.8678 | 211.537 | 15 |
| 16 | 55 | (Japan) Kosuke Matsuura | Panther Racing | 25.8784 | 211.450 | 16 |
| 17 | 5 | (United States) Sarah Fisher | Dreyer & Reinbold Racing | 25.9194 | 211.116 | 17 |
| 18 | 22 | (United States) A. J. Foyt IV | Vision Racing | 25.9430 | 210.924 | 18 |
| 19 | 15 | (United States) Buddy Rice | Dreyer & Reinbold Racing | 25.9585 | 210.798 | 19 |
| 20 | 76 | (United States) P. J. Chesson | Roth Racing | 26.0962 | 209.686 | 20 |
| 21 | 25 | (Canada) Marty Roth | Roth Racing | 26.1307 | 209.409 | 21 |
| 22 | 23 | (Venezuela) Milka Duno | SAMAX Motorsport | 26.5623 | 206.006 | 22 |

== Race ==
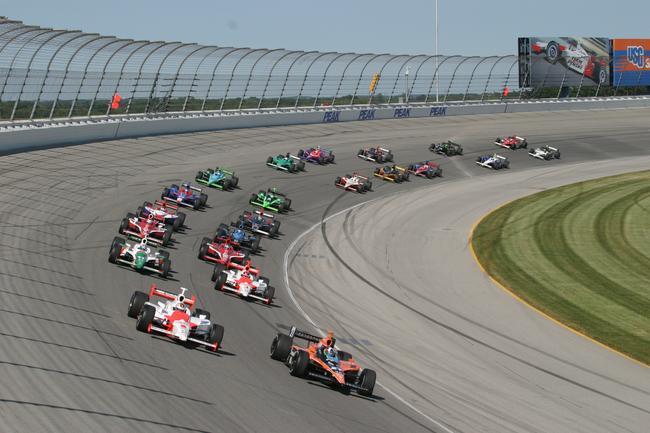
The start of the race, with Dario Franchitti and Sam Hornish Jr. leading the field.

The weather conditions towards the beginning of the race were sunny and dry, with an air temperature at 81 °F (27 °C) and a track temperature between 107 and 115 °F (42 and 46 °C). Jim Shea, the executive vice president of merchandising for AutoZone, commanded the drivers to start their engines. The race began at 3:00 p.m. Central Daylight Time (UTC−05:00). Hornish pulled alongside Franchitti on the back stretch and led the first lap by 0.0617 seconds. His Team Penske teammate Castroneves quickly assumed second place from Franchitti and remained within under a tenth of a second behind Hornish's lead. On the 17th lap, Kanaan sustained a puncture to his right-rear tire and was forced to make a pit stop, effectively eliminating him from championship contention. Nine laps later, Dixon passed Franchitti for fourth place. The first caution flag of the race was issued on lap 35; Andretti spun backwards into the outside wall in turn four and did not return to the race. Due to complaints of neck pain, he was transported to Provena St. Joseph's Medical Center in Joliet, Illinois to be evaluated by CAT scan; he was found to have no significant injury. The next lap, Scheckter lost his right-rear tire and came into pit road to replace it. All of the drivers, except Kanaan, made their first pit stops on lap 38, with Castroneves exiting pit road ahead of the others to claim the lead ahead of Dixon, Hornish, Wheldon, and Franchitti. Chesson endured a long stop because of a bent right-side mirror, while Carpenter was ordered to drop to the rear of the field for exceeding the pit road speed violation.

Green-flag racing resumed on lap 45; Hornish promptly overtook Dixon for second, as did Sharp for fifth place over Franchitti. Following a lap-53 pit stop from Manning, who later retired from the race because of handling issues, a round of green-flag pit stops began with Kanaan and Carpenter on the 70th lap. Castroneves and Hornish pitted 16 laps later, giving up the lead to Dixon, who himself came in for a stop on the 89th lap. After Franchitti made his stop on lap 93, Castroneves retained his lead, only to be passed by Hornish in turn three nine laps later. The Team Penske drivers remained near each other until the second cycle of green-flag pit stops commenced on the 126th lap. Dixon again assumed the lead for six laps once they both came in for their stops on lap 130. As Dixon and Patrick made their pit stops on the 136th lap, the caution flag was flown for the second time the following lap when Meira slammed the turn four wall, by which point Franchitti had already taken the lead. He made a stop on lap 140 for four fresh tires and fuel, handing the lead to Dixon. The caution was extended to let track officials repair the damaged SAFER barrier that Meira collided into. Dixon and Franchitti took advantage of the lengthy caution period to fill up their fuel tanks on lap 147, which put them on a separate fuel strategy from their fellow competitors. The green flag was waved again on lap 152. Hornish moved his way through the field over the next eight laps, taking the lead from Dixon in the second turn on the 160th lap. He maintained an approximately 0.2-second lead over Dixon until he pulled into pit road for the last round of stops on lap 184.

Dixon led the next seven laps before his Chip Ganassi Racing teammate Wheldon got by him on lap 191; he maintained the lead until he ran out of fuel on the back stretch three laps later. On the 195th lap, Patrick spun while entering pit road. The resulting caution flag — the third of the race — gave Franchitti and Dixon the opportunity to save fuel; the title contenders gained a lap on all other racers as they chose to pit once more. Franchitti drove to the outside alongside Dixon during the ensuing restart on lap 198, but was unable to complete a pass. On the final lap, however, Dixon's car sputtered and twitched with a dwindling supply of fuel as he and Franchitti entered turn three. Franchitti swerved up the track to avoid the slowing Dixon and drove to the win, his fourth victory of the season and the eighth of his career, which gave him enough points to clinch the first Drivers' Championship of his 23-year motor racing career and the record-breaking third IndyCar Series title for Andretti Green Racing. The margin between Franchitti and Dixon, the only two drivers to finish on the lead lap, was 1.8439 seconds. Hornish finished in third, Castroneves fourth, and Sharp fifth. Kanaan came in sixth, ahead of Hunter-Reay, who secured the Rookie of the Year award by finishing seventh. Mutoh, Rice, and Foyt rounded out the top-ten, and the remaining classified finishers were Patrick, Fisher, Roth, Duno, Carpenter, and Chesson. The race featured 13 lead changes between five different drivers. Hornish led 90 laps, more than anyone else, while Franchitti led three times for a total of ten laps.

=== Post-race ===
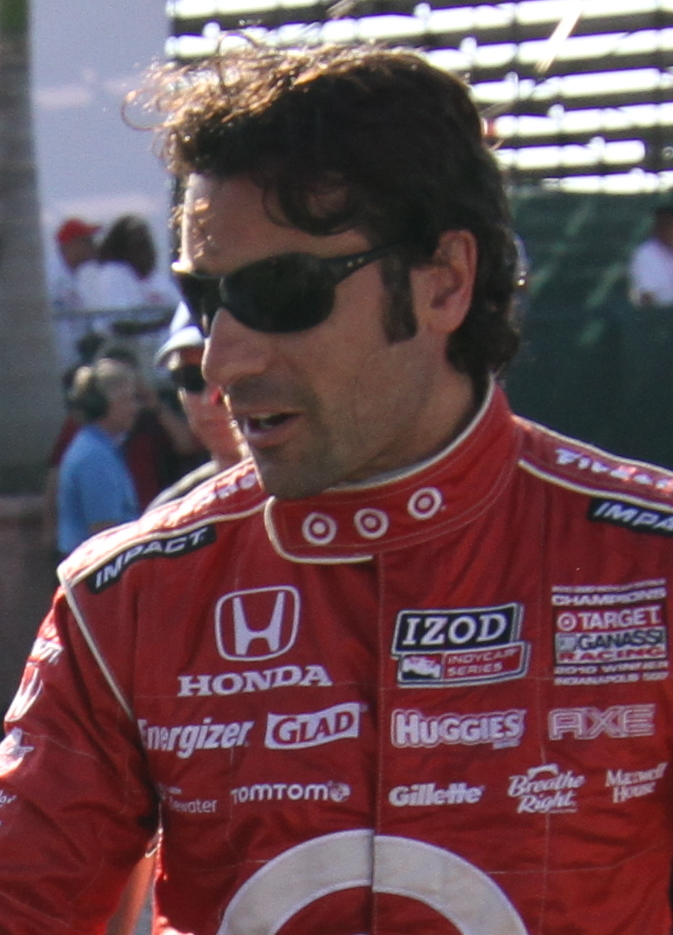
Dario Franchitti (pictured in 2011) earned his eighth career win and his first IndyCar Series championship after overtaking Scott Dixon on the last lap.

Franchitti celebrated his first championship with his team in victory lane in front of a crowd; the race win earned him $111,400. He discussed his emotions in a post-race interview: "I’m stunned. That was a hell of a finish. Most of the race I was just sitting in the car; I couldn’t do anything out there. [...] The car came back stronger toward the end, and on the last lap I was trying to set up a pass on Scott [Dixon], and then he slowed down. I was so surprised I almost ran into the back of him. It was some good strategy by my boys on the team. The whole Andretti Green team is the best in the business. It’s been a great season. I’ve loved working with my guys and racing in front of these great IndyCar fans." Franchitti did not defend his title in 2008, choosing instead to divert to the NASCAR Sprint Cup Series with Chip Ganassi Racing; however, he quit mid-season because of a string of poor results and returned to the IndyCar Series in 2009. A disappointed Dixon stated that Franchitti seemed to have better fuel milage in the race, "We were on even par with that last stop, coming in together and topping off, but they just seemed to be back in the pack saving fuel, and we didn't have enough. But I pretty much knew going back to the restart that it was going to be a slim chance." He still congratulated Franchitti on his title, calling him a "deserving champion."

Third-placed Hornish expressed discontentment that he and Castroneves failed to win the race, saying: "We definitely had the fastest car, and it's just unfortunate things ended up the way they did. I'm not sure how the leaders were able to save so much fuel, but it is what it is. Hélio and I had the cars to beat out there and it's just a shame Team Penske didn't get the win and end the season on a high note." Hornish, who was the winningest driver in IndyCar Series history at the time (19 wins), also pursued a career in the Sprint Cup Series beginning in 2008, but never raced in the IndyCar Series again. Castroneves was displeased with the officiating that placed everyone except Franchitti and Dixon a lap down, "It's unfortunate that the race officials made the call that left only two cars on the lead lap. If it wasn't for this, I'm confident that either Sam or I would have come away with the win." However, he was proud of his pit crew for executing "flawless" pit stops in the race. Franchitti ended the 2007 season with 637 points to earn his first Drivers' Championship; it was the highest amount of points that an IndyCar Series champion had ever accumulated in a season. Dixon trailed Franchitti by 11 points, and Kanaan in third was a further 48 points in arrears. Wheldon finished fourth in the standings with 466 points, one more than Hornish in fifth place.

=== Race classification ===
Final race results
| Pos | No. | Driver | Team | Laps | Time/Retired | Grid | Points |
|---|---|---|---|---|---|---|---|
| 1 | 27 | (United Kingdom) Dario Franchitti | Andretti Green Racing | 200 | 1:44:53.7950 | 1 | 50 |
| 2 | 9 | (New Zealand) Scott Dixon | Chip Ganassi Racing | 200 | +1.8439 | 6 | 40 |
| 3 | 6 | (United States) Sam Hornish Jr. | Team Penske | 199 | +1 Lap | 2 | 38^{1} |
| 4 | 3 | (Brazil) Hélio Castroneves | Team Penske | 199 | +1 Lap | 3 | 32 |
| 5 | 8 | (United States) Scott Sharp | Rahal Letterman Racing | 199 | +1 Lap | 11 | 30 |
| 6 | 11 | (Brazil) Tony Kanaan | Andretti Green Racing | 199 | +1 Lap | 4 | 28 |
| 7 | 17 | (United States) Ryan Hunter-Reay | Rahal Letterman Racing | 198 | +2 Laps | 12 | 26 |
| 8 | 60 | (Japan) Hideki Mutoh | Panther Racing | 198 | +2 Laps | 13 | 24 |
| 9 | 15 | (United States) Buddy Rice | Dreyer & Reinbold Racing | 198 | +2 Laps | 19 | 22 |
| 10 | 22 | (United States) A. J. Foyt IV | Vision Racing | 198 | +2 Laps | 18 | 20 |
| 11 | 7 | (United States) Danica Patrick | Andretti Green Racing | 198 | +2 Laps | 7 | 19 |
| 12 | 5 | (United States) Sarah Fisher | Dreyer & Reinbold Racing | 196 | +4 Laps | 17 | 18 |
| 13 | 10 | (United Kingdom) Dan Wheldon | Chip Ganassi Racing | 193 | Out of fuel | 5 | 17 |
| 14 | 25 | (Canada) Marty Roth | Roth Racing | 190 | +10 Laps | 21 | 16 |
| 15 | 23 | (Venezuela) Milka Duno | SAMAX Motorsport | 184 | +16 Laps | 22 | 15 |
| 16 | 20 | (United States) Ed Carpenter | Vision Racing | 164 | +36 Laps | 14 | 14 |
| 17 | 55 | (Japan) Kosuke Matsuura | Panther Racing | 156 | Electrical | 16 | 13 |
| 18 | 4 | (Brazil) Vítor Meira | Panther Racing | 133 | Accident | 15 | 12 |
| 19 | 76 | (United States) P. J. Chesson | Roth Racing | 94 | +106 Laps | 20 | 12 |
| 20 | 2 | (South Africa) Tomas Scheckter | Vision Racing | 73 | Handling | 9 | 12 |
| 21 | 14 | (United Kingdom) Darren Manning | A. J. Foyt Enterprises | 62 | Handling | 8 | 12 |
| 22 | 26 | (United States) Marco Andretti | Andretti Green Racing | 34 | Accident | 10 | 12 |

Notes

- ^1 – Includes three bonus points for leading the most laps.

== Championship standings after the race ==
Drivers' Championship standings
| +/– | Pos. | Driver | Points |
|---|---|---|---|
| Unchanged | 1 | (United Kingdom) **Dario Franchitti** | **637** |
| Unchanged | 2 | (New Zealand) Scott Dixon | 624 (–13) |
| Unchanged | 3 | (Brazil) Tony Kanaan | 576 (–61) |
| Unchanged | 4 | (United Kingdom) Dan Wheldon | 466 (–171) |
| Unchanged | 5 | (United States) Sam Hornish Jr. | 465 (–172) |

- Note: Only the top five positions are included.
- **Bold text** indicates the National Champion.

| Previous race: 2007 Detroit Indy Grand Prix | IndyCar Series; 2007 season | Next race: 2008 Gainsco Auto Insurance Indy 300 |
| Previous race: 2006 Peak Antifreeze Indy 300 | Peak Antifreeze Indy 300 | Next race: 2008 Peak Antifreeze Indy 300 |
