= SAMAX Motorsport =

SAMAX Motorsport was a racing team owned by Peter Baron that competed primarily in the Rolex Sports Car Series but also spent one year in the IndyCar Series.

== Team history ==
The team was founded in 2005 by fielding a car for Mark Greenberg at the 6 Hours of Mont Tremblant. Shortly after that race the team ran the #7 Riley-Pontiac Daytona Prototype co-owned by millionaire businessman Brian Tuttle, Greg Wilkins and Dave Lacey and the #17 Porsche 911 GT3 in Grand Am. In 2006, Milka Duno joined the Daytona Prototype team, bringing with her sponsorship from Citgo. The team of Duno, Patrick Carpentier, Darren Manning, and Ryan Dalziel finished 2nd overall in the 2007 24 Hours of Daytona, the team's best Grand Am finish and the best finish in a major sports car race for a female driver. SAMAX fielded a second Prototype in the 2007 24 Hours of Daytona for Roger Yasukawa, Tomáš Enge, Chris Festa, and Christian Montanari that finished 6th.

On March 23, 2007, the team announced that it would enter the Indy Racing League IndyCar Series. They ran Duno with Citgo sponsorship in 6 races during the 2007 season, including the Indianapolis 500. French-Canadian driver Jean-Francois Dumoulin replaced her in the prototype. The team did not return to the IndyCar Series in 2008 as Duno moved to Dreyer & Reinbold Racing, but continued in the Rolex Sports Car Series with their BMW-Riley being driven by Dalziel and Henri Zogaib. The team of Dalziel and Zogaib captured the team's first Daytona Prototype victory in the 5th race of the season at Mazda Raceway Laguna Seca. Despite the success, the team did not return for 2009. Reportedly, Zogaib had been funding the racing venture through employing a Ponzi scheme in which he had conned the Dalziel family for US$550,000 and owes SAMAX owner Peter Baron US$450,000 in team expenses and US$800,000 in investments Baron had made in the Ponzi scheme.

In 2010, Baron re-entered team ownership with the new Starworks Motorsport team.

== Racing results ==
=== Complete IRL IndyCar Series results ===
(key)

Year	Chassis	Engine	Drivers	No.	1	2	3	4	5	6	7	8	9	10	11	12	13	14	15	16	17
2007					HMS	STP	MOT	KAN	INDY	MIL	TXS	IOW	RIR	WGL	NSH	MDO	MCH	KTY	SNM	DET	CHI
2007	Dallara IR-05	Honda HI7R V8	(Venezuela) Milka Duno	23				14	31		11	18	19				19				15
