= Childress-Howard Motorsports =

Professional sports car racing team

Childress-Howard Motorsports is a professional sports car racing team competing in the Rolex Sports Car Series Daytona Prototype class.

== Howard Motorsports (2002-2007) ==
The team campaigned two Daytona Prototypes throughout the season with a third car being added in select races. The No. 2 Citgo-sponsored Pontiac Crawford was driven by Milka Duno and Andy Wallace, while the team's No. 4 BOSS Snowplow Pontiac Crawford was piloted by the pairing of Elliott Forbes-Robinson and Butch Leitzinger. The third car, the No. 20 Citgo Pontiac Crawford, was generally driven by NASCAR driver Tony Stewart.

== Childress-Howard Motorsports (2008-) ==
It was later announced in early 2007 that the team had partnered with NASCAR team Richard Childress Racing and will be called Childress-Howard Motorsports. The team ran a limited schedule in 2008 in preparation for a possible full season in 2009 and Wallace will be the full-time driver for the team. The only race that the team ran in 2008 was the Crown Royal 200 at Watkins Glen International with the next generation #4 AT&T Pontiac Crawford with Wallace and Andy Lally driving. The team started the race 13th and finished 19th out of the 20 cars entered.

Wallace will continue for the 2009 Rolex Sports Car Series season, and will be joined by Rob Finlay as full-time drivers of the #2 Crawford-Pontiac. At the Rolex 24 at Daytona, they will be joined by Childress' #07 NASCAR driver Casey Mears and IndyCar Series driver Danica Patrick.

The team receives factory backing from chassis constructor Crawford Composites.
