= 2007 Iowa Corn Indy 250 =

Indycar race held in Newton, Iowa

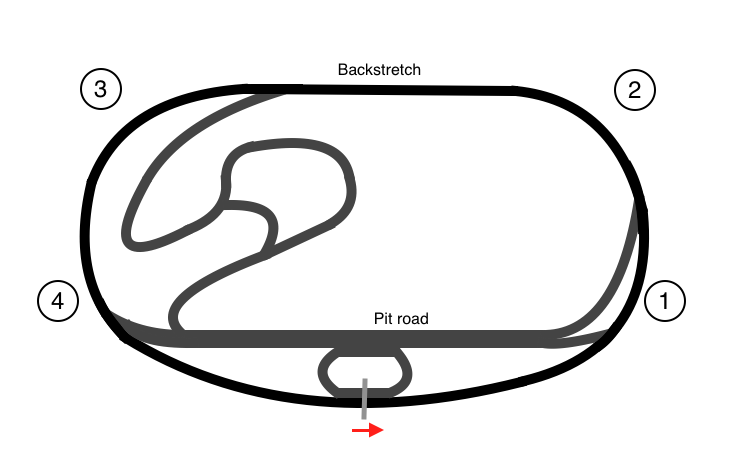
The layout of Iowa Speedway

The 2007 Iowa Corn Indy 250 was a race in the 2007 IRL IndyCar Series. It was held over the weekend of June 22–24, 2007, as the eighth round of the seventeen-race calendar. It was the inaugural race at the brand-new 0.875-mile (1.408 km) Iowa Speedway.

== Pre-Race ==
Practice scheduled for Friday was shortened due to thunderstorms in the area. Despite lack of Friday practice, many drivers expressed awe at the 7/8th mile track for being so fast, with practice speeds averaging over 180 mph (290 km/h). Drivers originally believed that it would be a competitive race, but soon found out that passing would be very difficult. The other main concern of the track was the physical requirements, with the 7/8th mile track driving like a superspeedway and drivers experiencing 4.8 lateral G-Forces during the race. Scott Dixon won the pole in qualifying on Saturday (182.360 mph/17.6486 secs). Hélio Castroneves qualified 2nd (182.272 mph/17.6571 secs), while Danica Patrick came in 11th (180.974 mph/17.7838 secs).

== Race ==
The first half of the race was a "crashfest" with 7 cars crashing out in the first 100 laps. The largest crash occurred on a restart on lap 100, when cars tried to go 4 wide on the frontstretch. Danica Patrick, Sam Hornish Jr., and others were eliminated. Many driver's blamed the hard tires of the race. This was caused because of an unusually cool day, with temperatures around 75 degrees for the race, originally forecast as late as the night before the race around 90-95 degrees. Pole sitter Scott Dixon had steering problems at the start, and originally retired, though his team repaired the car and he ended up 10th, many laps down. The race ended up a battle between Andretti-Green Racing teammates Dario Franchitti and Marco Andretti, with Franchitti winning. Scott Sharp came in third.

=== Classification ===
Fin. Pos	Car No.	Driver	Team	Laps	Time/Retired	Grid	Laps Led	Points
1	27	(United Kingdom) Dario Franchitti	Andretti Green Racing	250	1:48:14.1344	3	96	50+3
2	26	(United States) Marco Andretti	Andretti Green Racing	250	+0.0681	12	4	40
3	8	(United States) Scott Sharp	Rahal Letterman Racing	250	+1.0577	4	4	35
4	15	(United States) Buddy Rice	Dreyer & Reinbold Racing	250	+4.2426	17	5	32
5	14	(United Kingdom) Darren Manning	A.J. Foyt Racing	250	+5.2156	15	0	30
6	20	(United States) Ed Carpenter	Vision Racing	247	+3 Laps	5	0	28
7	5	(United States) Sarah Fisher	Dreyer & Reinbold Racing	247	+3 Laps	18	0	26
8	3	(Brazil) Hélio Castroneves	Team Penske	246	+4 Laps	2	57	24
9	4	(Brazil) Vítor Meira	Panther Racing	216	Suspension	13	71	22
10	9	(New Zealand) Scott Dixon	Chip Ganassi Racing	173	+77 Laps	1	10	20
11	10	(United Kingdom) Dan Wheldon	Chip Ganassi Racing	145	+105 Laps	9	0	19
12	22	(United States) A. J. Foyt IV	Vision Racing	99	Crash	10	0	18
13	7	(United States) Danica Patrick	Andretti Green Racing	99	Crash	11	1	17
14	6	(United States) Sam Hornish Jr.	Team Penske	99	Crash	8	0	16
15	55	(Japan) Kosuke Matsuura	Panther Racing	99	Crash	16	0	15
16	11	(Brazil) Tony Kanaan	Andretti Green Racing	85	Crash	7	0	14
17	17	(United States) Jeff Simmons	Rahal Letterman Racing	85	Crash	6	0	13
18	23	(Venezuela) Milka Duno (R)	SAMAX Motorsport	60	Too slow*	19	0	12
19	2	(South Africa) Tomas Scheckter	Vision Racing	0	Crash	14	0	12
Lead changes: 13 between 8 drivers

=== Note ===
Milka Duno was ordered by race officials to maintain a minimum speed and when she failed to meet that speed she was parked.

== Caution Periods ==
There were six caution periods during the race, with a total of sixty-seven laps run under yellow.

Laps	Cause
1-12	Dan Wheldon and Tomas Scheckter crash in turn 2
74-82	Hélio Castroneves spin in turn 2
86-98	Tony Kanaan and Jeff Simmons crash in turn 2
100-120	Hélio Castroneves, Sam Hornish Jr, Danica Patrick, Ed Carpenter, A.J. Foyt IV, and Kosuke Matsuura crash on the frontstretch
144-150	Debris on the frontstretch
227-231	Debris in turn 2
