= 2008 Indy Japan 300 =

IndyCar Series event

(Japan) 2008 Motegi
Race details
- 3rd (A) round of the 2008 IndyCar Series season
- Date: April 20, 2008
- Official name: Indy Japan 300
- Location: Twin Ring Motegi
- Course: Permanent racing facility 1.520 mi / 2.446 km
- Distance: 200 laps 304.000 mi / 489.241 km
- Weather: 54 °F (12 °C), Mostly cloudy

Pole position
- Driver: (Brazil) Hélio Castroneves ( (United States) Penske Racing)
- Time: set by driver points

Fastest lap
- Driver: (Brazil) Hélio Castroneves ( (United States) Penske Racing)
- Time: 27.6476 (on lap 12 of 200)

Podium
- First: (United States) Danica Patrick ( (United States) Andretti Green Racing)
- Second: (Brazil) Hélio Castroneves ( (United States) Penske Racing)
- Third: (New Zealand) Scott Dixon ( (United States) Chip Ganassi Racing)

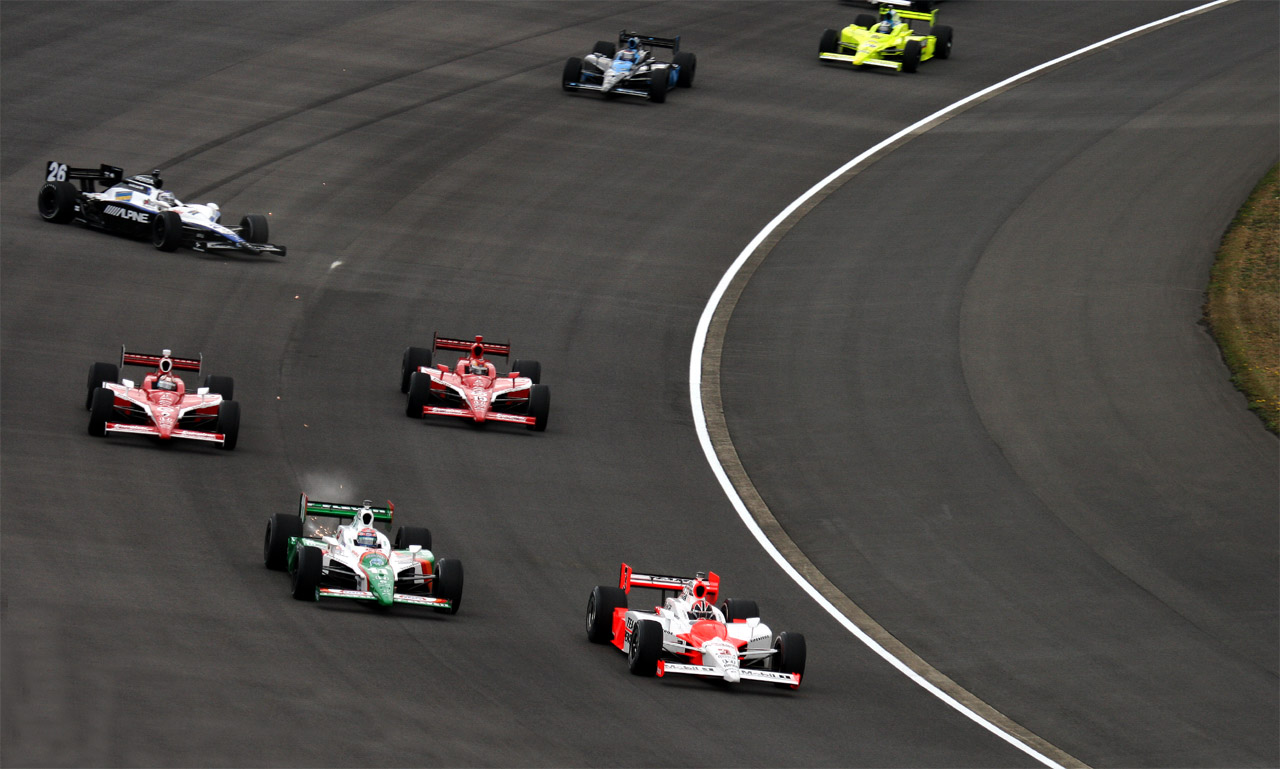
The race, with Marco Andretti spinning out.

The 2008 Indy Japan 300 was the third round of the 2008 IndyCar Series season, for drivers who competed in the series in 2007 and teams that had entered for 2008 who were not former Champ Car teams that were in transition. This was because the 2008 Toyota Grand Prix of Long Beach occurred on the same weekend and there was no way of changing dates to avoid the clash when the reunification took place. Originally scheduled for the afternoon of April 19, 2008 at the 1.52-mile (2.45 km) Twin Ring Motegi in Motegi, Tochigi, the race was delayed by 22 hours until the morning of April 20, due to water seeping up onto the track from previous heavy rains. Danica Patrick won the race, becoming the first female winner in the history of top-level American open-wheel racing.

== Qualifying ==
Due to rain in the Tochigi region, qualifying was cancelled and the field was set by driver points. Thus, the grid was:

Qualifying grid for the 2008 Indy Japan 300
Pos	No.	Driver	Team
1	3	(Brazil) Hélio Castroneves	Penske Racing
2	9	(New Zealand) Scott Dixon	Chip Ganassi Racing
3	11	(Brazil) Tony Kanaan	Andretti Green Racing
4	26	(United States) Marco Andretti	Andretti Green Racing
5	10	(United Kingdom) Dan Wheldon	Chip Ganassi Racing
6	7	(United States) Danica Patrick	Andretti Green Racing
7	20	(United States) Ed Carpenter	Vision Racing
8	2	(United States) A. J. Foyt IV	Vision Racing
9	27	(Japan) Hideki Mutoh (R)	Andretti Green Racing
10	17	(United States) Ryan Hunter-Reay	Rahal Letterman Racing
11	15	(United States) Buddy Rice	Dreyer & Reinbold Racing
12	14	(United Kingdom) Darren Manning	A. J. Foyt Enterprises
13	4	(Brazil) Vítor Meira	Panther Racing
14	24	(United Kingdom) Jay Howard (R)	Roth Racing
15	6	(Australia) Ryan Briscoe	Penske Racing
16	23	(United States) Townsend Bell	Dreyer & Reinbold Racing
17	25	(Canada) Marty Roth	Roth Racing
18	77	(United States) Roger Yasukawa	CURB/Agajanian/Beck Motorsports

== Race ==
The race's average speed was 164.258 mph (264.348 km/h) and it featured five lead changes between four drivers, as well as cautions on four for 29 laps.

Outcome of the 2008 Indy Japan 300
Finish	Car No.	Driver	Team	Laps	Time/Retired	Grid	Laps Led	Points
1	7	(United States) Danica Patrick	Andretti Green Racing	200	1:51:02.6739	6	3	50
2	3	(Brazil) Hélio Castroneves	Penske Racing	200	+5.8594	1	94	40
3	9	(New Zealand) Scott Dixon	Target Chip Ganassi	200	+10.0559	2	101	38
4	10	(United Kingdom) Dan Wheldon	Target Chip Ganassi	200	+13.1116	5	2	32
5	11	(Brazil) Tony Kanaan	Andretti Green Racing	200	+16.0731	3	0	30
6	20	(United States) Ed Carpenter	Vision Racing	200	+16.2872	7	0	28
7	17	(United States) Ryan Hunter-Reay (R)	Rahal Letterman Racing	200	+17.5193	10	0	26
8	14	(United Kingdom) Darren Manning	A. J. Foyt Enterprises	199	+1 Lap	12	0	24
9	6	(Australia) Ryan Briscoe	Penske Racing	199	+1 Lap	15	0	22
10	23	(United States) Townsend Bell	Dreyer & Reinbold Racing	199	+1 Lap	16	0	20
11	27	(Japan) Hideki Mutoh (R)	Andretti Green Racing	199	+1 Lap	9	0	19
12	15	(United States) Buddy Rice	Dreyer & Reinbold Racing	198	+2 Laps	11	0	18
13	24	(United Kingdom) Jay Howard	Roth Racing	192	+8 Laps	14	0	17
14	77	(United States) Roger Yasukawa	CURB/Agajanian/Beck Motorsports	134	Brakes	18	0	16
15	2	(United States) A. J. Foyt IV	Vision Racing	103	Accident	8	0	15
16	4	(Brazil) Vítor Meira	Panther Racing	92	Accident	13	0	14
17	25	(Canada) Marty Roth	Roth Racing	44	Accident	17	0	13
18	26	(United States) Marco Andretti	Andretti Green Racing	0	Collision	4	0	12
