= 2007 SunTrust Indy Challenge =

Indycar race held in Richmond, Virginia

The layout of Richmond International Raceway

The 2007 SunTrust Indy Challenge was a race in the 2007 IRL IndyCar Series, held at Richmond International Raceway. It was held over 28 -June 30, 2007, as the ninth round of the seventeen-race calendar. It was the third of four night races on the 2007 calendar.

== Classification ==
Fin. Pos	Car No.	Driver	Team	Laps	Time/Retired	Grid	Laps Led	Points
1	27	(United Kingdom) Dario Franchitti	Andretti Green Racing	250	1:24:19.6684	1	241	50+3
2	9	(New Zealand) Scott Dixon	Chip Ganassi Racing	250	+0.4194	3	0	40
3	10	(United Kingdom) Dan Wheldon	Chip Ganassi Racing	250	+1.3629	4	0	35
4	11	(Brazil) Tony Kanaan	Andretti Green Racing	250	+2.9088	2	8	32
5	15	(United States) Buddy Rice	Dreyer & Reinbold Racing	250	+5.9130	12	0	30
6	7	(United States) Danica Patrick	Andretti Green Racing	250	+6.3619	8	0	28
7	2	(South Africa) Tomas Scheckter	Vision Racing	250	+7.5597	10	0	26
8	8	(United States) Scott Sharp	Rahal Letterman Racing	250	+8.5739	7	0	24
9	4	(Brazil) Vítor Meira	Panther Racing	250	+9.5276	9	0	22
10	20	(United States) Ed Carpenter	Vision Racing	250	+10.3247	15	0	20
11	3	(Brazil) Hélio Castroneves	Team Penske	249	+1 Lap	6	1	19
12	26	(United States) Marco Andretti	Andretti Green Racing	249	+1 Lap	14	0	18
13	22	(United States) A. J. Foyt IV	Vision Racing	249	+1 Lap	17	0	17
14	14	(United Kingdom) Darren Manning	A.J. Foyt Racing	249	+1 Lap	13	0	16
15	6	(United States) Sam Hornish Jr.	Team Penske	248	+2 Laps	5	0	15
16	5	(United States) Sarah Fisher	Dreyer & Reinbold Racing	247	+3 Laps	16	0	14
17	55	(Japan) Kosuke Matsuura	Panther Racing	236	Crash	18	0	13
18	17	(United States) Jeff Simmons	Rahal Letterman Racing	153	Crash	11	0	12
19	23	(Venezuela) Milka Duno (R)	SAMAX Motorsport	79	Too slow*	19	0	12
Lead changes: 5 between 3 drivers

== Note ==
Milka Duno was for the second race in a row parked by race officials for failing to meet the minimum speed.

== Caution Periods ==
There were four caution periods during the race, with a total of thirty-three laps run under yellow.

Laps	Cause
1-3	Sam Hornish Jr spun on the frontstretch
61-70	Debris in turn 2
86-98	Tony Kanaan and Jeff Simmons crash in turn 2
100-120	Jeff Simmons crash in turn 2
239-243	Sam Hornish Jr and Kosuke Matsuura crash in turn 4
