= Darren Manning =

British racing driver (born 1975)

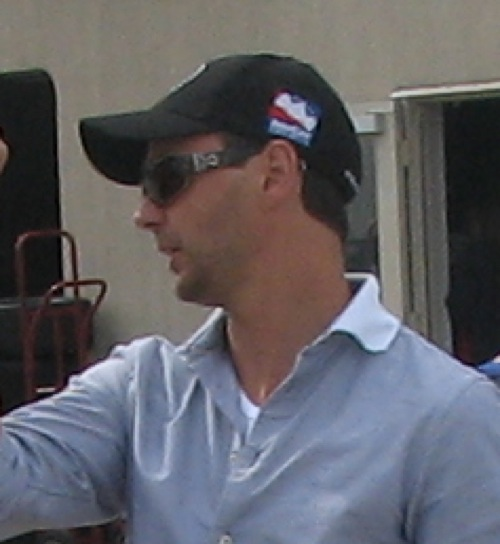
- Darren Manning at the Indianapolis Motor Speedway in 2009.
- Nationality: British
- Born: 30 April 1975 (age 51) Knaresborough, England

IRL IndyCar Series career
- Debut season: 2004
- Car number: 23
- Former teams: Chip Ganassi Racing, A. J. Foyt Enterprises
- Starts: 60
- Wins: 0
- Poles: 0
- Best finish: 11th in 2004

Previous series
- 2000–2001 2002 2002–2003 2006–2007: Formula 3000; ASCAR; CART; A1 Grand Prix

Darren Manning (born 30 April 1975) is a British motor racing driver who has raced in the IRL IndyCar Series for Chip Ganassi Racing and Dreyer & Reinbold Racing.

== Career history ==
=== Early career ===
Manning was born in Knaresborough, North Yorkshire, and began his racing career at the age of ten, competing in British and International karting events. In 1992, he took part in the Brands Hatch Formula First Winter Series, finishing second after recording two wins. His SpeedSport team took him in 1993 to race in the Formula Vauxhall championship again recording two victories en route to a second-place finish in the championship. He was also a finalist for the McLaren Autosport Young Driver of the Year award.

Manning continued in Formula Vauxhall in 1994 and 1995 and moved up to Formula 3 in 1996 and 1997. Budget constraints meant that he only raced a limited F3 schedule in 1998, but he did achieve two wins including at Silverstone for the British Grand Prix support race.

=== International career ===
In 1999, Manning won the All-Japan Formula Three championship, and was the first driver to achieve the "perfect victory" at the Macau Grand Prix since Ayrton Senna by winning from pole position, leading every lap and setting a lap record. He also tested with the Williams F1 team. In 2000, he began working for the BAR Honda F1 team as a test driver while also racing in the FIA International Formula 3000 championship for Arden Team Russia.

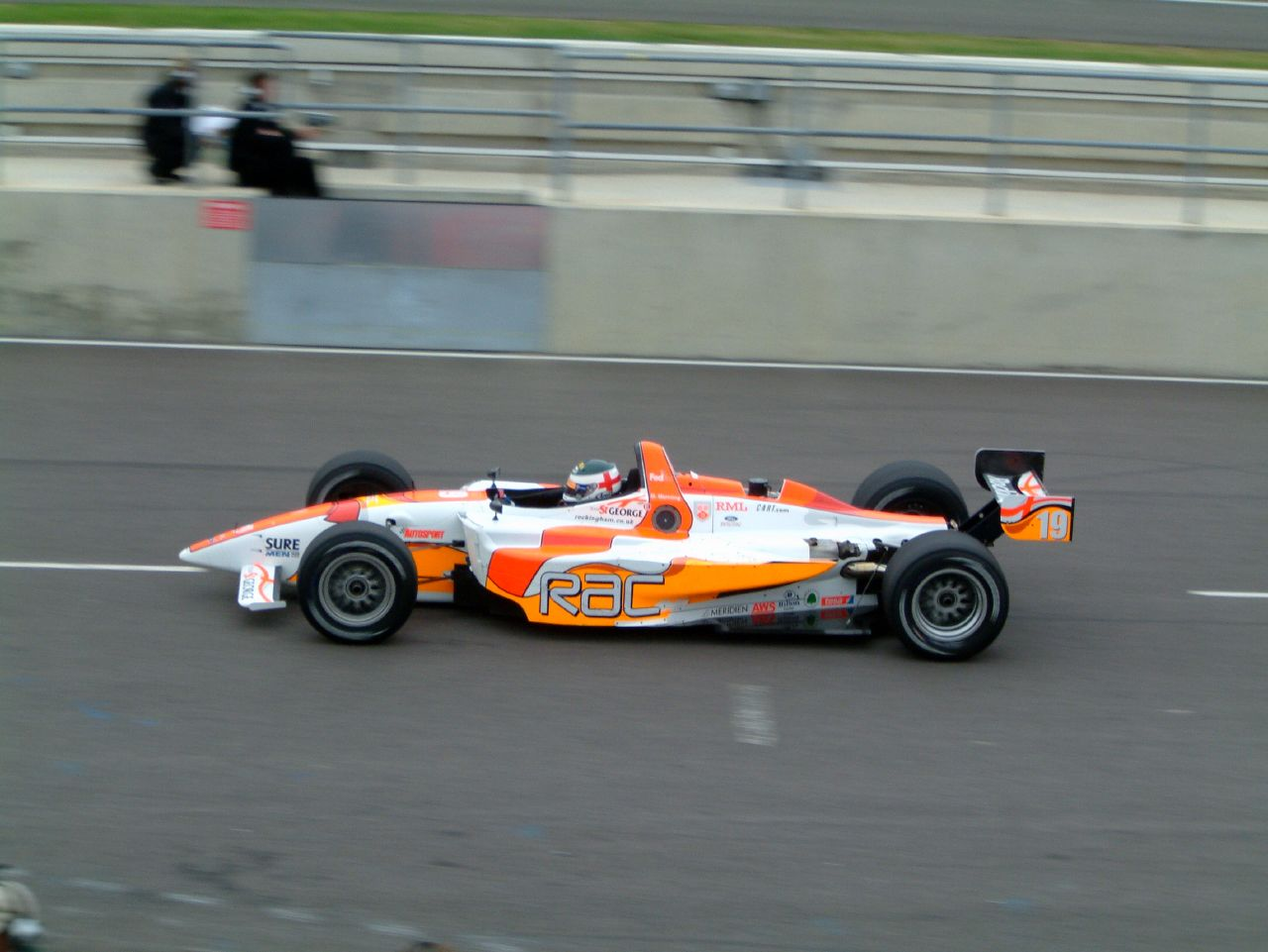
Manning competing in the 2002 Sure for Men Rockingham 500

In 2002, Manning competed in the ASCAR (now SCSA) championship. He had a one-off drive in the FIA Sportscar championship at Magny-Cours driving a Tampolli SR2 RTA-2001 in the SR2 class for JCI Developments. He also had a one-off drive at Rockingham in the CART series for Team St George, leading eighteen laps on the way to ninth place. This led to a full-time drive for Walker Racing in 2003, taking one top-three finish and ninth overall in the championship.

Manning joined Chip Ganassi's IRL team for 2004, in place of Tony Renna after Renna's fatal testing accident, finishing eleventh in the championship having achieved eight top-ten finishes, but he was released from his contract in the middle of 2005 after 24 starts, including the 2004 and 2005 Indianapolis 500.

Manning raced at the last round of the 2005/6 A1 Grand Prix series at Shanghai, because main driver Robbie Kerr had other commitments and Manning helped secure A1 Team Great Britain third place in the overall standings. During 2006, he also drove a Nissan 350Z in the FIA GT Championship for RJN Motorsport.

For the 2006-07 A1 Grand Prix season, Manning moved into a permanent role in the Great Britain A1GP team, alongside Robbie Kerr and Oliver Jarvis.

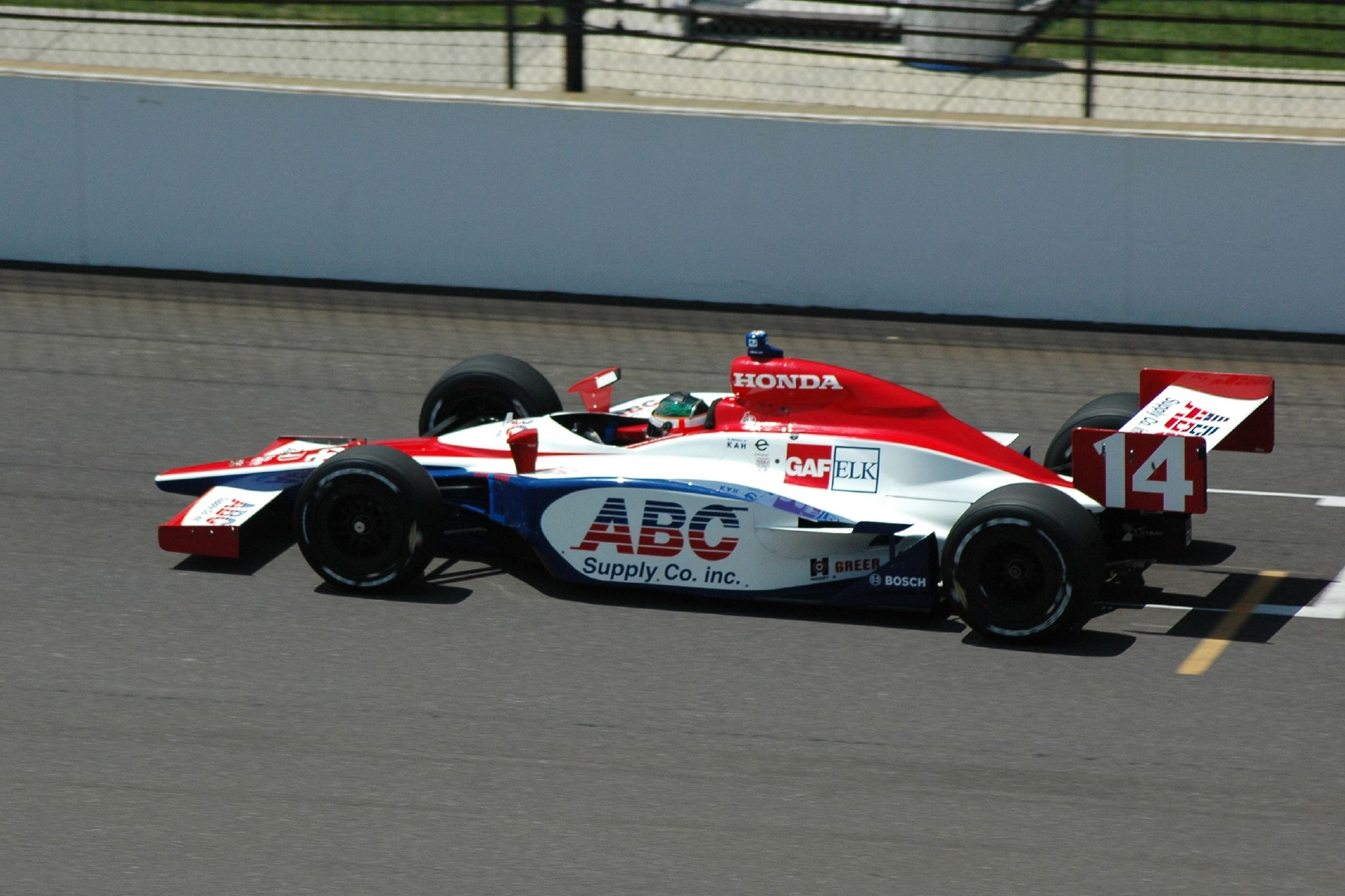
Manning practicing for the 2008 Indianapolis 500

On 14 November 2006, Manning was named the driver of the A. J. Foyt Enterprises No. 14 car in the IRL IndyCar series for the 2007 season, marking his return to the league after a one-year absence. Manning also drove in the 2007 24 Hours of Daytona and led his team to a second-place finish, leading the race during a long overnight stint in the rain. He finished thirteenth in IndyCar points in 2007, capturing five top-tens in what was widely considered a significant step forward for the previously struggling Foyt team. In 2008, he finished second at Watkins Glen, with six further top ten finishes en route to fourteenth overall.

In 2009, Manning was racing for Dreyer & Reinbold Racing in IndyCar, but left after two races. No reason has been given by either driver or team.

In 2010, Manning drove for Spirit of Daytona Racing in the Rolex 24 Hours of Daytona in the No. 90 Daytona Prototype.

== Motorsports career results ==
=== Complete Japanese Formula Three Championship results ===
(key) (Races in bold indicate pole position) (Races in italics indicate fastest lap)

Year	Team	Engine	1	2	3	4	5	6	7	8	9	10	DC	Pts
1998	Team Yellow Hat	HKS-Mitsubishi	SUZ	TSU	MIN	FUJ	MOT	SUZ	SUG	TAI; 17	SEN; 3	SUG; 8	11th	4
1999	TOM'S	Toyota	SUZ; 4	**TSU**; 1	**FUJ**; 1	**MIN**; 1	**FUJ**; 1	**SUZ**; 1	SUG; 1	**TAI**; 3	MOT; 2	SUZ	1st	60

=== Complete Super GT results ===
Year	Team	Car	Class	1	2	3	4	5	6	7	8	9	DC	Points
1999	TOM'S	Toyota Supra	GT500	SUZ	FUJ; 4	SUG	MIN	FUJ	TAI	MOT			19th	10
2006	Hasemi Motorsport	Nissan Z	GT500	SUZ	TAI	FUJ	SEP	SUG	SUZ; 8	MOT	AUT	FUJ	25th	8

=== Complete International Formula 3000 results ===
(key) (Races in bold indicate pole position) (Races in italics indicate fastest lap)

Year	Entrant	1	2	3	4	5	6	7	8	9	10	11	12	DC	Points
2000	Arden Team Russia	IMO; 12	**SIL**; 2	CAT; 7	NUR; Ret	MON; Ret	MAG; 8	A1R; 3	HOC; 13	HUN; 8	SPA; Ret			8th	10
2001	Arden Team Russia	INT; 8	IMO; 2	CAT; 20	A1R; Ret	MON; Ret	NUR; 7	MAG; 5	SIL; 6	HOC; Ret	HUN; Ret	SPA; Ret	MNZ; Ret	11th	9

=== American Open-Wheel ===
(key)

==== CART ====
Year	Team	No.	Chassis	Engine	1	2	3	4	5	6	7	8	9	10	11	12	13	14	15	16	17	18	19	Rank	Points	Ref
2002	Team St. George	19	Lola B02/00	Ford XF V8 t	MTY	LBH	MOT	MIL	LS	POR	CHI	TOR	CLE	VAN	MDO	ROA	MTL	DEN	ROC; 9	MIA	SRF	FON	MXC	**21st**	**4**	
2003	Walker Racing	15	Reynard 02i	Ford XFE V8 t	STP; 13	MTY; 7	LBH; 8	BRH; 10	LAU; 6	MIL; 4	LS; 18	POR; 6	CLE; 10	TOR; 8	VAN; 5	ROA; 6	MDO; 8	MTL; 10	DEN; 8	MIA; 11	MXC; 9	SRF; 2	FON; NH	**9th**	**103**	

==== IndyCar Series ====
Year	Team	No.	Chassis	Engine	1	2	3	4	5	6	7	8	9	10	11	12	13	14	15	16	17	18	19	Rank	Points	Ref
2004	Chip Ganassi Racing	10	G-Force GF09B	Toyota Indy V8	HMS; 6	PHX; 5	MOT; 4	INDY; 25	TXS; 8	RIR; 20	KAN; 11	NSH; 4	MIL; 19	MIS; 13	KTY; 10	PPIR; 4	NZR; 6	CHI; 15	FON; DNS	TX2; INJ				11th	323	
2005	Chip Ganassi Racing	10	Panoz GF09C	Toyota Indy V8	HMS; 6	PHX; 8	STP; 9	MOT; 8	INDY; 29	TXS; 17	RIR; 15	KAN; 7	NSH; 20	MIL; 20	MIS	KTY	PPIR	SNM	CHI	WGL	FON			21st	186	
2007	A. J. Foyt Enterprises	14	Dallara IR-05	Honda HI7R V8	HMS; 13	STP; 12	MOT; 12	KAN; 11	INDY; 20	MIL; 11	TXS; 13	IOW; 5	RIR; 14	WGL; 9	NSH; 9	MDO; 6	MIS; 15	KTY; 13	SNM; 12	DET; 4	CHI; 21			13th	332	
2008	A. J. Foyt Enterprises	14	Dallara IR-05	Honda HI7R V8	HMS; 13	STP; 13	MOT^{1} 8	LBH^{1} DNP	KAN; 24	INDY; 9	MIL; 13	TXS; 28	IOW; 21	RIR; 12	WGL; 2	NSH; 9	MDO; 8	EDM; 10	KTY; 19	SNM; 22	DET; 12	CHI; 7	SRF^{2}	14th	323	
2009	Dreyer & Reinbold Racing	23	Dallara IR-05	Honda HI7R V8	STP; 8	LBH; 16	KAN	INDY	MIL	TXS	IOW	RIR	WGL	TOR	EDM	KTY	MDO	SNM	CHI	MOT	HMS			31st	38	

^{1} Run on same day.
^{2} Non-points-paying, exhibition race.

Years	Teams	Races	Poles	Wins	Podiums (non-win)	Top 10s (non-podium)	Indianapolis 500 wins	Championships
5	3	60	0	0	1	25	0	0

=== Complete A1 Grand Prix results ===
(key) (Races in bold indicate pole position) (Races in italics indicate fastest lap)

Year	Entrant	1	2	3	4	5	6	7	8	9	10	11	12	13	14	15	16	17	18	19	20	21	22	DC	Points
2005–06	Great Britain	GBR; SPR	GBR; FEA	GER; SPR	GER; FEA	POR; SPR	POR; FEA	AUS; SPR	AUS; FEA	MYS; SPR	MYS; FEA	UAE; SPR	UAE; FEA	RSA; SPR	RSA; FEA	IDN; SPR	IDN; FEA	MEX; SPR	MEX; FEA	USA; SPR	USA; FEA	CHN; SPR; 2	CHN; FEA; 15	**3rd**	**97**
2006–07	Great Britain	NED; SPR; 5	NED; FEA; 7	CZE; SPR	CZE; FEA	BEI; SPR	BEI; FEA	MYS; SPR	MYS; FEA	IDN; SPR	IDN; FEA	NZL; SPR	NZL; FEA	AUS; SPR	AUS; FEA	RSA; SPR	RSA; FEA	MEX; SPR	MEX; FEA	SHA; SPR	SHA; FEA	GBR; SPR	GBR; SPR	**3rd**	**92**

=== Complete American Le Mans Series results ===
Year	Entrant	Class	Chassis	Engine	Tyres	1	2	3	4	5	6	7	8	9	10	11	12	Rank	Points
2007	Arena Motorsports International	LMP1	Zytek 07S	Zytek 2ZG408 4.0L V8	**M**	SEB	STP	LNB	TEX	UTA	LIM	MID	AME	MOS	DET	PET ovr:Ret cls:Ret	MON ovr:10 cls:4	16th	25

Sporting positions
Preceded by Peter Dumbreck	All-Japan Formula Three; Champion; 1999	Succeeded by Sebastien Philippe
Preceded by Peter Dumbreck	Macau Grand Prix; Winner; 1999	Succeeded by André Couto
