= World Series Formula V8 3.5 =

Former Single-Seater Racing Championship

- Category: Open-wheel single-seater Formula auto racing
- Country: International
- Inaugural season: 1998
- Folded: 2017
- Constructors: Dallara
- Engine suppliers: Zytek badged as Renault (2011–2015); Zytek (2016–2017)
- Tyre suppliers: Michelin
- Last Drivers' champion: (Brazil) Pietro Fittipaldi
- Last Teams' champion: (Czech Republic) Lotus
- Official website: Official website

The World Series Formula V8 3.5, formerly the World Series by Nissan from 1998 to 2004, the Formula Renault 3.5 Series from 2005 to 2015 and the Formula V8 3.5 in 2016 and 2017, was a motor racing series promoted by RPM Racing (1998–2004) and Renault Sport (2005–2015).

== History ==
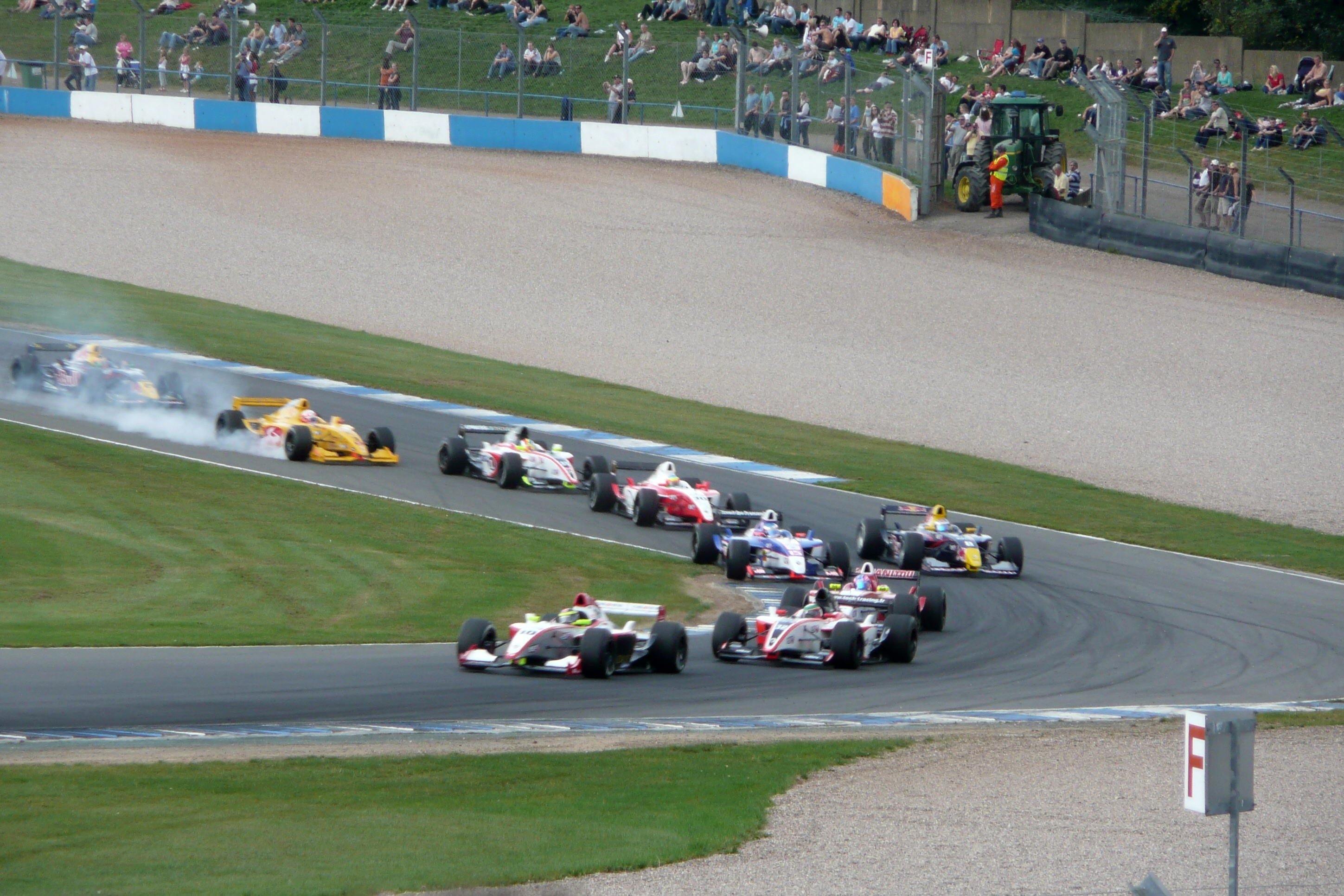
Formula Renault 3.5 Series at Donington Park in 2007.

The series came out of the Spanish Formula Renault Championship, which ran from 1991 to 1997. The World Series was founded as Open Fortuna by Nissan in 1998, and was mostly based in Spain, but visited other countries throughout its history, including France, Italy, Portugal and Brazil. The organization was handled by RPM Comunicacion, founded by Jaime Alguersuari Tortajada. The series changed name a number of times, usually adopting the name of its main sponsor, but was also known by other common names such as the unofficial "Formula Nissan".

In its early years, the series used chassis built by Coloni (type N1/C983), with a 2.0 L Nissan SR20 engine developed by Nissan Motorsports Europe in Britain, fielding 250bhp. The series slotted in between Formula Three and Formula 3000. In 2002, it adopted a new format, with chassis supplied by Dallara and the engine upgraded to the VQ30. The series also became more international, with more than half of the race calendar held outside Spain.

Renault started the Formula Renault V6 Eurocup in 2003, as a support series in Eurosport's Super Racing Weekends (European Touring Car Championship and FIA GT Championship). The series ran with Tatuus chassis and a Nissan 3.5 L V6 engine.

In 2005, Renault left the Super Racing Weekend and started the World Series by Renault and the Formula Renault 3.5 Series, merging both the World Series by Nissan (whose engine contract had finished) and Renault V6 Eurocup. The Dallara chassis was retained, while the Renault V6 was improved to 425 PS. Formula Renault 2.0 Eurocup and the Eurocup Mégane Trophy also joined the series in 2005 to support the main FR3.5 series.

At the end of July 2015, Renault Sport announced it would be withdrawing its backing to the Formula Renault 3.5 from 2016 onwards, handing the control of the series to co-organiser RPM. However, Renault Sport also said it would continue the World Series by Renault with the Renault Sport Trophy and the Formula Renault 2.0 Eurocup. As a result of this, RPM decided to change the series' name to Formula V8 3.5. In December 2016, the series' name was changed again to World Series Formula V8 3.5, giving extra recognition to the championship. On 17 November 2017 was announced that due to lack of entries the series would not take place in 2018 with a possibility of relaunch in the near future.

== Technical ==
From 2008 to 2011, the chassis for the Formula Renault 3.5 Series is the Dallara T08 and the engine a 3.5 litre V6 Nissan VQ35 unit producing 480 bhp with a rev limit of 8500 rpm. The gearbox is a 6 speed semi-automatic supplied by Ricardo with steering wheel paddle shift. Total weight of the car is 600 kg (dry).

Starting from 2012 season, the Formula Renault 3.5 Series adopted a new chassis, the Dallara T12, powered by a 3.4 litre V8 engine producing 530 BHP at 9250 rpm developed by Zytek. The cars have 50 more horsepower than previous season and lost 15 kg (33 pounds) of weight. In addition, a Drag Reduction System is used, which operates in a similar way to the one in use in Formula One.

=== Specifications ===
- Engine displacement: 3.4 L (207 cu in) DOHC V8
- Gearbox: 6-speed paddle shift gearbox (must have reverse)
- Weight: 623 kg (1,373 lb)
- Power output: 530 hp (395 kW)
- Torque output: 330 lb⋅ft (447 N⋅m)
- Fuel: Elf LMS 102 RON unleaded
- Fuel capacity: 29 US gallons (110 litres)
- Fuel delivery: Fuel injection
- Aspiration: Normally-aspirated
- Length: 5,070 mm (200 in)
- Width: 1,930 mm (76 in)
- Wheelbase: 3,125 mm (123 in)
- Steering: Power-assisted rack and pinion

== Champions ==
=== World Series by Nissan ===
Season	Series Name	Champion	Team Champion	Ref
1998	Open Fortuna by Nissan	(Spain) Marc Gené	(Spain) Campos Motorsport	
1999	Euro Open MoviStar by Nissan	(Spain) Fernando Alonso	(Spain) Campos Motorsport	
2000	Open Telefónica by Nissan	(Spain) Antonio García	(Spain) Campos Motorsport	
2001	Open Telefónica by Nissan	(France) Franck Montagny	(Italy) Vergani Racing	
2002	Telefónica World Series	(Brazil) Ricardo Zonta	(Spain) Racing Engineering	
2003	Superfund World Series	(France) Franck Montagny	(France) Gabord Competición	
2004	World Series by Nissan	(Finland) Heikki Kovalainen	(Spain) Pons Racing	

NOTE – 1998–2001, mainly Spanish-based series (also known as Formula Nissan) with 2.0L engine.
NOTE – 2002–2004, international series with V6 engine.

=== World Series Light ===
Season	Champion	Team Champion	Ref
2002	(Spain) Santiago Porteiro	(Spain) Meycom	
2003	(Argentina) Juan Cruz Álvarez	(Spain) Meycom	
2004	(Serbia) Miloš Pavlović	(Italy) Vergani Racing	

=== Formula Renault 3.5 Series ===
Season	Champion	Team Champion	Rookie of the year	Ref
2005	(Poland) Robert Kubica	(Spain) Epsilon Euskadi	not awarded	
2006	(Sweden) Alx Danielsson	(Austria) Interwetten.com	not awarded	
2007	(Portugal) Álvaro Parente	(France) Tech 1 Racing	(Portugal) Filipe Albuquerque	
2008	(Netherlands) Giedo van der Garde	(France) Tech 1 Racing	(France) Charles Pic	
2009	(Belgium) Bertrand Baguette	(Portugal) International DracoRacing	(United Kingdom) Oliver Turvey	
2010	(Russia) Mikhail Aleshin	(France) Tech 1 Racing	(Australia) Daniel Ricciardo	
2011	(Canada) Robert Wickens	(United Kingdom) Carlin	(United States) Alexander Rossi	
2012	(Netherlands) Robin Frijns	(France) Tech 1 Racing	(Netherlands) Robin Frijns	
2013	(Denmark) Kevin Magnussen	(France) DAMS	(Belgium) Stoffel Vandoorne	
2014	(Spain) Carlos Sainz Jr.	(France) DAMS	(France) Pierre Gasly	
2015	(United Kingdom) Oliver Rowland	(United Kingdom) Fortec Motorsports	(Netherlands) Nyck de Vries	

=== World Series Formula V8 3.5 ===
Season	Champion	Team Champion	Ref
2016	(France) Tom Dillmann	(United Kingdom) Arden Motorsport	
2017	(Brazil) Pietro Fittipaldi	(Czech Republic) Lotus	

== Notable drivers ==
Formula One drivers in the future and/or past

- Marc Gené (1998: Champion, 2003: 12th), competed in Formula One for Minardi and Williams.
- Fernando Alonso (1999: Champion), competed in Formula One for Minardi, McLaren, Ferrari, Alpine, and was twice world champion with Renault. Currently competing in Formula One for Aston Martin.
- Giorgio Pantano (1999: 21st), competed in Formula One for Jordan.
- Franck Montagny (2001: Champion, 2002: 2nd, 2003: Champion), competed in Formula One for Super Aguri, and with Andretti in Formula E.
- Ricardo Zonta (2002: Champion), 1997 FIA GT Champion, competed in Formula One for BAR, Jordan and Toyota.
- Justin Wilson (2002: 4th), competed in Formula One for Minardi and Jaguar, and in IndyCar for Dale Coyne and Andretti Autosport.
- Narain Karthikeyan (2002: 9th, 2003: 4th, 2004: 6th), competed in Formula One for Jordan and HRT in 2011.
- Heikki Kovalainen (2003: 2nd, 2004: Champion), competed in Formula One for Renault, McLaren, Caterham and Team Lotus.
- Enrique Bernoldi (2003: 6th, 2004: 3rd), competed in Formula One for Arrows.
- Stéphane Sarrazin (2003: 7th), competed in Formula One for Minardi, currently with SMP Racing in the FIA World Endurance Championship.
- Tiago Monteiro (2004: 2nd), competed in Formula One for Jordan and Midland/Spyker. Currently competing in World Touring Car Cup (WTCR) with Munnich Motorsport.
- Robert Kubica (2005: Champion), competed in Formula One for BMW Sauber, Renault, Williams F1, and Alfa Romeo Racing.
- Markus Winkelhock (2005: 3rd), one-off Formula One drive for Spyker (Nurburgring 2007).
- Kamui Kobayashi (2005 Eurocup: 1st), competed in Formula One for Toyota, Sauber and Caterham.
- Karun Chandhok (2005: 29th), competed in Formula One for HRT and Lotus.
- Pastor Maldonado (2005: 25th; 2006: 3rd), competed in Formula One for Williams and Lotus.
- Sebastian Vettel (2006: 15th, 2007: 5th − 1st after seven races, when withdrew to compete in F1), competed in Formula One for BMW Sauber, Toro Rosso, Ferrari, Aston Martin, and was four time Formula One world champion with Red Bull Racing.
- Giedo van der Garde (2007: 6th, 2008: Champion), competed in Formula One for Caterham.
- Jaime Alguersuari (2009: 6th), competed in Formula One for Toro Rosso.
- Daniel Ricciardo (2010: 2nd; 2011: 5th), competed in Formula One for HRT, Toro Rosso, Red Bull Racing, Renault, McLaren, AlphaTauri and RB.
- Jean-Éric Vergne (2010: 8th; 2011: 2nd), competed in Formula One for Toro Rosso, currently competing for DS Penske in Formula E.
- Robin Frijns (2012: Champion), Formula One reserve driver for Caterham in 2014.
- Jules Bianchi (2012: 2nd), last competed in Formula One with Marussia. On 5 October 2014, during the Japanese Grand Prix, Bianchi lost control of his Marussia in very wet conditions and collided with a recovery vehicle, suffering a brain injury. He underwent emergency surgery and was placed into an induced coma, and remained comatose until his death on 17 July 2015.
- Will Stevens (2012: 12th; 2013: 4th; 2014: 6th), competed in Formula One for Caterham and Marussia.
- Sergey Sirotkin (2013: 8th), competed in Formula One for Williams.
- Kevin Magnussen (2013: Champion), competed in Formula One with McLaren, Renault and Haas.
- Stoffel Vandoorne (2013: 2nd), competed in Formula One for McLaren, currently competing for DS Penske in Formula E.
- Roberto Merhi (2014: 3rd; 2015: 14th), competed in Formula One for Marussia.
- Carlos Sainz Jr. (2014: Champion), competed in Formula One for Toro Rosso, Renault, McLaren and Ferrari. Currently competing in Formula One for Williams.
- Alfonso Celis Jr. (2014: 27th; 2015: 16th; 2016: 11th; 2017: 3rd), development driver in Formula One for Force India from 2016 until 2017.
- Esteban Ocon (2014: 23rd), competed in Formula One for Force India, Renault and Alpine. Currently competing in Formula One for Haas.
- Pierre Gasly (2014: 2nd), competed in Formula One for Scuderia Toro Rosso, Red Bull Racing, and AlphaTauri. Currently competing in Formula One for Alpine.
- Pietro Fittipaldi (2017 Champion), competed in Formula One for Haas F1 Team. Reserve/development driver for Haas F1 Team in 2023.
- Nyck de Vries (2015: 3rd) competed in Formula One for Williams and AlphaTauri, currently competing for Mahindra in Formula E.

Champions in other categories

- Andy Priaulx (2001: 18th) – 2004 European Touring Car Championship (ETCC) Champion, 2005, 2006 and 2007 World Touring Car Championship (WTCC) World Champion
- Matteo Bobbi (2001: 11th, 2002: 6th) – 2003 FIA GT Champion
- Alex Lloyd (2005: 40th) – 2007 Indy Lights champion.
- Simon Pagenaud (2005: 16th) – 2006 Atlantics Champion 2016 IndyCar champion.
- Davide Valsecchi (2006: 10th, 2007: 16th) – 2012 GP2 Series Champion.
- Will Power (2005: 7th) 2014, 2022 IndyCar champion.
- Miloš Pavlović (2005: 17th; 2006: 11th; 2007: 3rd) – 2014 Lamborghini Super Trofeo
- Tom Dillmann (2015: 7th, 2016 Champion) 2022 Le Mans Cup - LMP3, 2024 IMSA SportsCar Championship - LMP2 champion, 2025 24 Hours of Le Mans - LMP2 winner.
- Alex Palou (2017: 10th) 2021, 2023, 2024, 2025 IndyCar champion.

Other notable drivers

- Álvaro Parente (2006: 5th; 2007: 1st) GP2 Series winner, has driven and stood on the podium for Super Nova Racing, Ocean Racing Technology, Scuderia Coloni, and Racing Engineering
- Esteban Guerrieri (2008: 8th, 2009: 19th, 2010: 3rd) 2011 and 2012 Indy Lights runner-up for Sam Schmidt Motorsports. 2019 WTCR runner-up.

== Television broadcast ==
World Series by Renault races were broadcast live as part of a package of the combined open-wheel and touring car races on the pan-European Eurosport subscription channel or its sister stations Eurosport2 and British Eurosport. Eurosport is also on-sold to several non-European networks, extending World Series by Renault's international reach as far as South East Asia and Oceania. The races are also carried live by Estonia channel Kanal 12 and Spain channel Aragon TV. Abbreviated highlights packages were carried by several other television networks and stations, including the British channels Sky Sports and MotorsTV, the Dutch RTL 7 channel, ESPN Star Sports in Asia, Speed in South America and Esporte Interativo in Brazil.

== See also ==
- Formula Renault V6 Eurocup
- World Series by Renault
