= 2003 World Series Lights =

2003 World Series Lights season

Seasons
- ← 2002 2004 →

The 2003 World Series Lights season was contested over eight race weekends with 16 races. In this one-make formula all drivers had to use the new Dallara chassis (Light 01/WSL3) and Nissan engines (Nissan AER). Six different teams and sixteen drivers competed with the titles going to Argentinian driver Juan Cruz Álvarez and Spanish team Meycom.

== Teams and drivers ==
All teams used the Dallara WSL3 chassis and Nissan AER engines.

Team	No.	Driver	Rounds
(Spain) Meycom	1	(Spain) Celso Míguez	All
(Spain) Meycom	2	(Argentina) Juan Cruz Álvarez	All
(Spain) Escuela Lois Circuit	3	(Spain) Adrián Vallés	All
(Spain) Escuela Lois Circuit	4	(Spain) Álvaro Barba	All
(Italy) Vergani Racing	5	(Austria) Mathias Lauda	All
(Italy) Vergani Racing	6	(Chile) Pablo Donoso	1-7
(Italy) Vergani Racing	6	(Netherlands) Paul Meijer	8
(Italy) Vergani Racing	12	(Venezuela) Milka Duno	All
(France) Epsilon by Graff	7	(France) Julien Vidot	All
(France) Epsilon by Graff	8	(Serbia and Montenegro) Miloš Pavlović	All
(Italy) RC Motorsport	9	(Brazil) Wagner Ebrahim	1
(Italy) RC Motorsport	9	(France) Bastien Brière	4-5
(Italy) RC Motorsport	9	(Spain) Sergio Hernández	7-8
(Italy) RC Motorsport	10	(Italy) Matteo Pellegrino	All
(Italy) RC Motorsport	11	(Indonesia) Ananda Mikola	All
(Hungary) Szasz Motorsport	14	(Israel) Chanoch Nissany	1–2, 4, 6-8

== Race calendar and results ==
Round		Location	Circuit	Date	Pole position	Fastest lap	Winning driver	Winning team
1	R1	Monza, Italy	Autodromo Nazionale Monza	22 June	(Spain) Adrián Vallés	(Spain) Álvaro Barba	(Spain) Adrián Vallés	(Spain) Escuela Lois Circuit
1	R2	Monza, Italy	Autodromo Nazionale Monza	22 June	(Spain) Adrián Vallés	(Serbia and Montenegro) Miloš Pavlović	(Spain) Adrián Vallés	(Spain) Escuela Lois Circuit
2	R1	Brandenburg, Germany	EuroSpeedway Lausitz	20 July	(Chile) Pablo Donoso	(Spain) Adrián Vallés	(Spain) Adrián Vallés	(Spain) Escuela Lois Circuit
2	R2	Brandenburg, Germany	EuroSpeedway Lausitz	20 July	(Chile) Pablo Donoso	(Spain) Adrián Vallés	(Chile) Pablo Donoso	(Italy) Vergani Racing
3	R1	Magny-Cours, France	Circuit de Nevers Magny-Cours	27 July	(Serbia and Montenegro) Miloš Pavlović	(France) Julien Vidot	(France) Julien Vidot	(Italy) Vergani Racing
3	R2	Magny-Cours, France	Circuit de Nevers Magny-Cours	27 July	(Spain) Celso Míguez	(Argentina) Juan Cruz Álvarez	(Argentina) Juan Cruz Álvarez	(Spain) Meycom
4	R1	Spielberg, Austria	Österreichring	21 September	(France) Julien Vidot	(Indonesia) Ananda Mikola	(France) Julien Vidot	(Italy) Vergani Racing
4	R2	Spielberg, Austria	Österreichring	21 September	(Indonesia) Ananda Mikola	(France) Julien Vidot	(France) Julien Vidot	(Italy) Vergani Racing
5	R1	Montmeló, Spain	Circuit de Catalunya	5 October	(France) Julien Vidot	(Spain) Álvaro Barba	(France) Julien Vidot	(Italy) Vergani Racing
5	R2	Montmeló, Spain	Circuit de Catalunya	5 October	(France) Julien Vidot	(Argentina) Juan Cruz Álvarez	(Argentina) Juan Cruz Álvarez	(Spain) Meycom
6	R1	Valencia, Spain	Circuit de Valencia	19 October	(Argentina) Juan Cruz Álvarez	(Serbia and Montenegro) Miloš Pavlović	(Argentina) Juan Cruz Álvarez	(Spain) Meycom
6	R2	Valencia, Spain	Circuit de Valencia	19 October	(Argentina) Juan Cruz Álvarez	(France) Julien Vidot	(Argentina) Juan Cruz Álvarez	(Spain) Meycom
7	R1	Albacete, Spain	Circuito de Albacete	2 November	(France) Julien Vidot	(Argentina) Juan Cruz Álvarez	(Argentina) Juan Cruz Álvarez	(Spain) Meycom
7	R2	Albacete, Spain	Circuito de Albacete	2 November	(Argentina) Juan Cruz Álvarez	(Argentina) Juan Cruz Álvarez	(Argentina) Juan Cruz Álvarez	(Spain) Meycom
8	R1	Madrid, Spain	Circuito del Jarama	30 November	(France) Julien Vidot	(Argentina) Juan Cruz Álvarez	(Argentina) Juan Cruz Álvarez	(Spain) Meycom
8	R2	Madrid, Spain	Circuito del Jarama	30 November	(France) Julien Vidot	(France) Julien Vidot	(Argentina) Juan Cruz Álvarez	(Spain) Meycom

=== Final points standings ===
For every race the points were awarded: 15 points to the winner, 12 for runner-up, 10 for third place, 8 for fourth place, 6 for fifth place, winding down to 1 point for 10th place. Lower placed drivers did not award points. Additional points were awarded to the driver setting the fastest race lap (2 points).

- Points System:

Pos	1	2	3	4	5	6	7	8	9	10	FL
Pts	20	15	12	10	8	6	4	3	2	1	2

Pos	Driver	MNZ (Italy)		LAU (Germany)		MAG (France)		A1R (Austria)		CAT (Spain)		VAL (Spain)		ALB (Spain)		JAR (Spain)		Points
1	(Argentina) Juan Cruz Álvarez	Ret	5	2	6	2	1	6	3	3	1	1	1	1	1	1	1	244
2	(France) Julien Vidot	2	13	Ret	Ret	1	4	1	1	1	8	Ret	Ret	3	3	2	2	170
3	(Serbia and Montenegro) Miloš Pavlović	Ret	4	Ret	3	3	3	9	4	2	2	4	2	5	4	5	Ret	145
4	(Spain) Adrián Vallés	1	1	1	2	6	Ret	13	6	7	4	Ret	Ret	8	5	7	6	126
5	(Spain) Celso Míguez	Ret	6	4	4	7	2	7	5	4	3	Ret	8	2	2	Ret	Ret	112
6	(Italy) Matteo Pellegrino	6	8	3	5	4	Ret	4	8	8	7	3	3	4	8	Ret	8	99
7	(Indonesia) Ananda Mikola	5	7	Ret	8	Ret	5	5	2	6	5	Ret	6	10	10	3	4	92
8	(Austria) Mathias Lauda	4	3	5	7	5	7	3	Ret	Ret	10	Ret	5	9	9	6	5	85
9	(Chile) Pablo Donoso	7	10	Ret	1	Ret	6	2	Ret	5	9	2	7	7	7			83
10	(Spain) Álvaro Barba	3	2	Ret	10	8	8	8	7	Ret	DNS	Ret	4	11	6	Ret	9	63
11	(Venezuela) Milka Duno	9	11	6	9	9	9	11	Ret	10	11	5	9	12	11	9	10	28
12	(Netherlands) Paul Meijer															4	3	22
13	(Spain) Sergio Hernández													6	Ret	8	7	13
14	(Israel) Chanoch Nissany	10	12	7	11			10	9			Ret	10	13	12	Ret	11	9
15	(France) Bastien Brière							12	Ret	9	6							8
16	(Brazil) Wagner Ebrahim	8	9															5
