= Tomas Scheckter =

South African racing driver

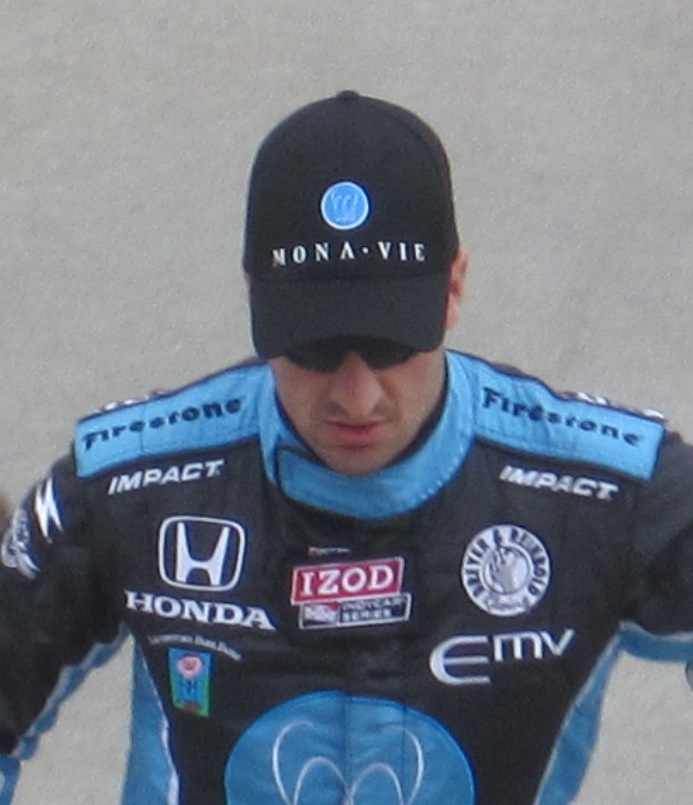
- Scheckter in 2010
- Nationality: (South Africa) South African
- Born: Tomas Michael Scheckter; 21 September 1980 (age 46) Monte Carlo, Monaco
- Relatives: Jody Scheckter (father); Ian Scheckter (uncle); Toby Scheckter (brother)

IRL IndyCar Series career
- Debut season: 2002
- Current team: Team REDLINE Xtreme
- Car number: 07
- Former teams: Conquest Racing; Dreyer & Reinbold Racing; Luczo Dragon Racing; Vision Racing; Panther Racing; Chip Ganassi Racing; Cheever Racing; KV Racing
- Starts: 115
- Wins: 2
- Poles: 8
- Best finish: 7th in 2003

Tomas Michael Scheckter (born 21 September 1980) is a South African former racing driver best known for his time in the IndyCar Series.

== Early years ==
Scheckter was born in Monte Carlo to 1979 Formula One World Champion Jody Scheckter and his first wife Pamela. Scheckter started racing karts in South Africa at the age of 11 and it did not take long for the young driver to reach the podium. He had his first taste of a major championship as a teenager when he captured the South African Kart Championship in 1995. In 1996, he ventured on to the main circuit in the South African Formula Vee series and soon after he was in the South African Formula Ford Series where he posted two wins.

Scheckter had proven his speed in South African motorsports and was then off to Europe the following year, where he entered the British Formula Vauxhall Junior series where he raced against the likes of Antônio Pizzonia and Takuma Sato. Scheckter earned third in the championship with one victory and one pole. He was also named series Rookie of the Year.

In 1999, Scheckter won the Formula Opel Euroseries championship with a record eight victories and eight poles, and in the process broke all the winning records previously set by Mika Häkkinen, Rubens Barrichello, and David Coulthard. That success landed him a drive that same year in the last two races of the Formula Nissan championship which Fernando Alonso had dominated that whole season. Even though Scheckter was with a new team for this brief stint in Formula Nissan, he captured a win, two poles and a second-place position.

Scheckter moved on to the Formula 3 Series in 2000, and in his rookie year, he was the runner-up in the British Formula 3 Championship with two victories and two pole positions, while contending again with drivers such as Takuma Sato, Antônio Pizzonia and Narain Karthikeyan. He also had time to race in the prestigious Marlboro Masters F3 race at Zandvoort where he took the third podium position. To complete his year, he competed in the final four races of the FIA Formula 3000 Championship, finishing second at Hockenheim behind future IRL teammate Tomáš Enge. He also raced in the Open Telefónica by Nissan, finishing as championship runner-up.

Scheckter was signed as a test/reserve driver by Jaguar for the 2001 Formula One season, but was soon let go after being found "kerb crawling."

== IndyCar Series ==
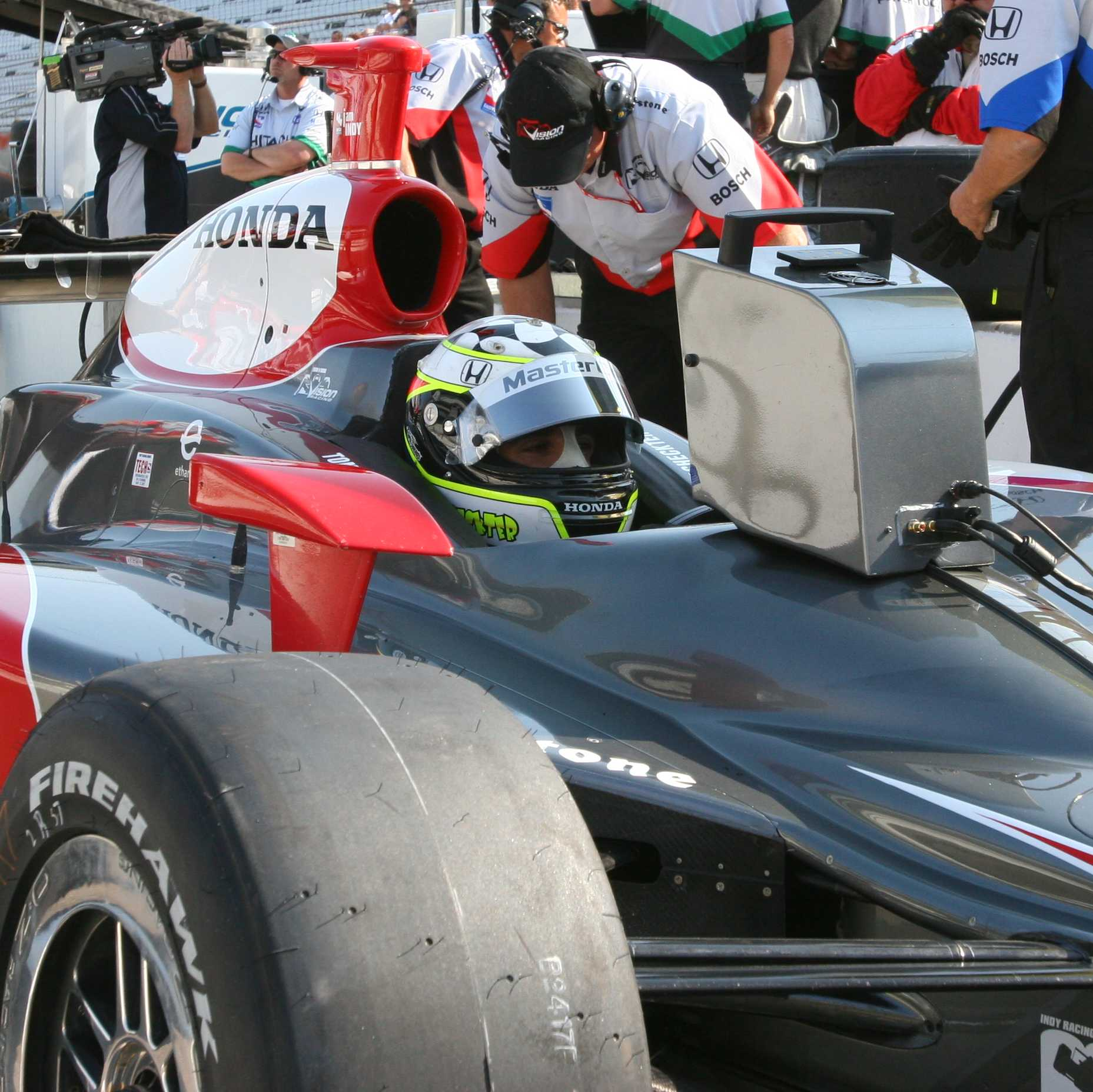
Scheckter watches practice speeds while waiting for his turn to qualify for the 2007 Indy 500. Photo by Tim Wohlford.

2002

Scheckter was signed to drive for Eddie Cheever's Red Bull Cheever Racing in the IndyCar Series for the 2002 season. He was the Indianapolis 500 co-Rookie of the year (with fourth placed Alex Barron) after leading 85 laps of the race. However, Cheever soon grew tired of Scheckter's frequent crashes, and looked to replace him with Buddy Rice. At Michigan International Speedway, Cheever was forced to race Scheckter due to contractual obligations, but gave Rice the best equipment and crew. In the 2002 Michigan Indy 400, Scheckter won by 1.7 seconds over Rice for his first IRL win, while team owner Cheever crashed out. However, he was soon gone from Cheever Racing.

2003-Mid 2005

In 2003, Scheckter moved to Target Ganassi Racing with mixed results, often being criticized for his inconsistency and frequency of crashing, finishing well behind title winning teammate Scott Dixon. In 2004, he moved to Panther Racing to replace double champion Sam Hornish Jr. In 2004 and 2005, Scheckter and Panther were the dominant Chevrolet powered team, greatly outpacing other teams powered by what many considered the weakest engine in the series. Scheckter broke through a horrendous string of bad luck, defeating Hornish to win the Bombardier Learjet 500 at Texas Motor Speedway in June 2005 for his second career victory.

Mid 2005-07

In mid-2005, Scheckter was announced as one of the drivers for A1 Team South Africa in the inaugural A1 Grand Prix series. He raced in the rounds at EuroSpeedway Lausitz and Estoril. In 2006, Scheckter drove for Tony George and Patrick Dempsey's Vision Racing alongside teammate Ed Carpenter and finished tenth in points. In 2007, Scheckter again raced for Vision Racing sponsored by Joost. Scheckter was one of the few drivers that year to challenge the Team Penske, Andretti Green Racing and Target Chip Ganassi Racing drivers on a regular basis during races, on occasion leading races. He ultimately finished tenth in points for the second season in a row with a best finish of fifth.

2008-09

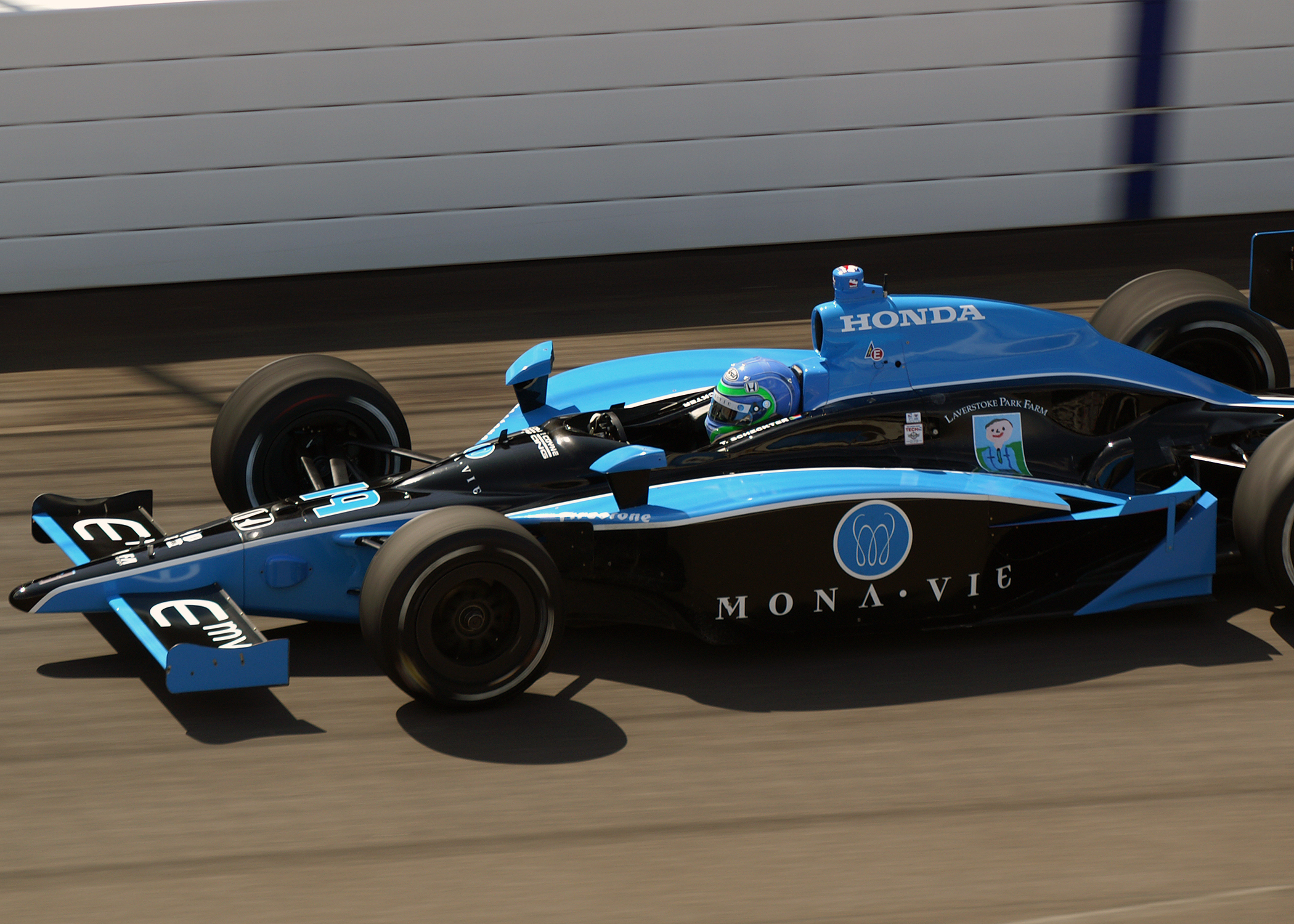
Scheckter practicing for the 2009 Indianapolis 500

For the 2008 season, Scheckter was scheduled to race for Luczo Dragon Racing in three races: Kansas, Indianapolis, and Infineon. Despite not finishing at Kansas or Indy, Scheckter's runs gave the team additional race time at Texas, Detroit, and Chicagoland. Scheckter failed to return any good results in the additional races despite qualifying well. He did not return to the team in 2009, as it became a full-time team with 2008 Indy Lights champion Raphael Matos. Scheckter was reported to be joining Beck Motorsports, now renamed Team 3G, starting at the 2009 Long Beach race, but the deal never materialized. Scheckter personally secured sponsorship from MonaVie which he shopped to a number of teams, ultimately signing with Dale Coyne Racing for a second week program. He qualified 26th and finished twelfth. Later in the 2009 season, he returned with the MonaVie sponsorship with Dreyer & Reinbold Racing sharing the No. 23 car with Milka Duno, who brought her own sponsorship, as well as driving a third car, the No. 43, in select races.

2010

In 2010, Scheckter once again brought Mona-Vie to Dreyer & Reinbold Racing to drive the No. 23 car in the Indianapolis 500. Scheckter had a great race, and was in the top for the majority of the race. In the last twenty laps a fuel mileage problem forced Scheckter to conserve fuel and he dropped back to finish twelfth. Scheckter's teammate Mike Conway suffered a leg injury in a terrible crash at the Indianapolis 500 and Scheckter was hired to fill in for Conway at Texas and Iowa finished fifteenth and nineteenth at each. Later in the year, he was hired to drive for Conquest Racing at Chicago and Kentucky. Scheckter finished 28th at Chicago, but after having a surprisingly quick time in practice and qualifying he was accidentally hit from behind by Alex Lloyd in the first ten laps and made contact with the wall that ended his day. At Kentucky Scheckter struggled getting the car up to speed and finished fourteenth.

2011

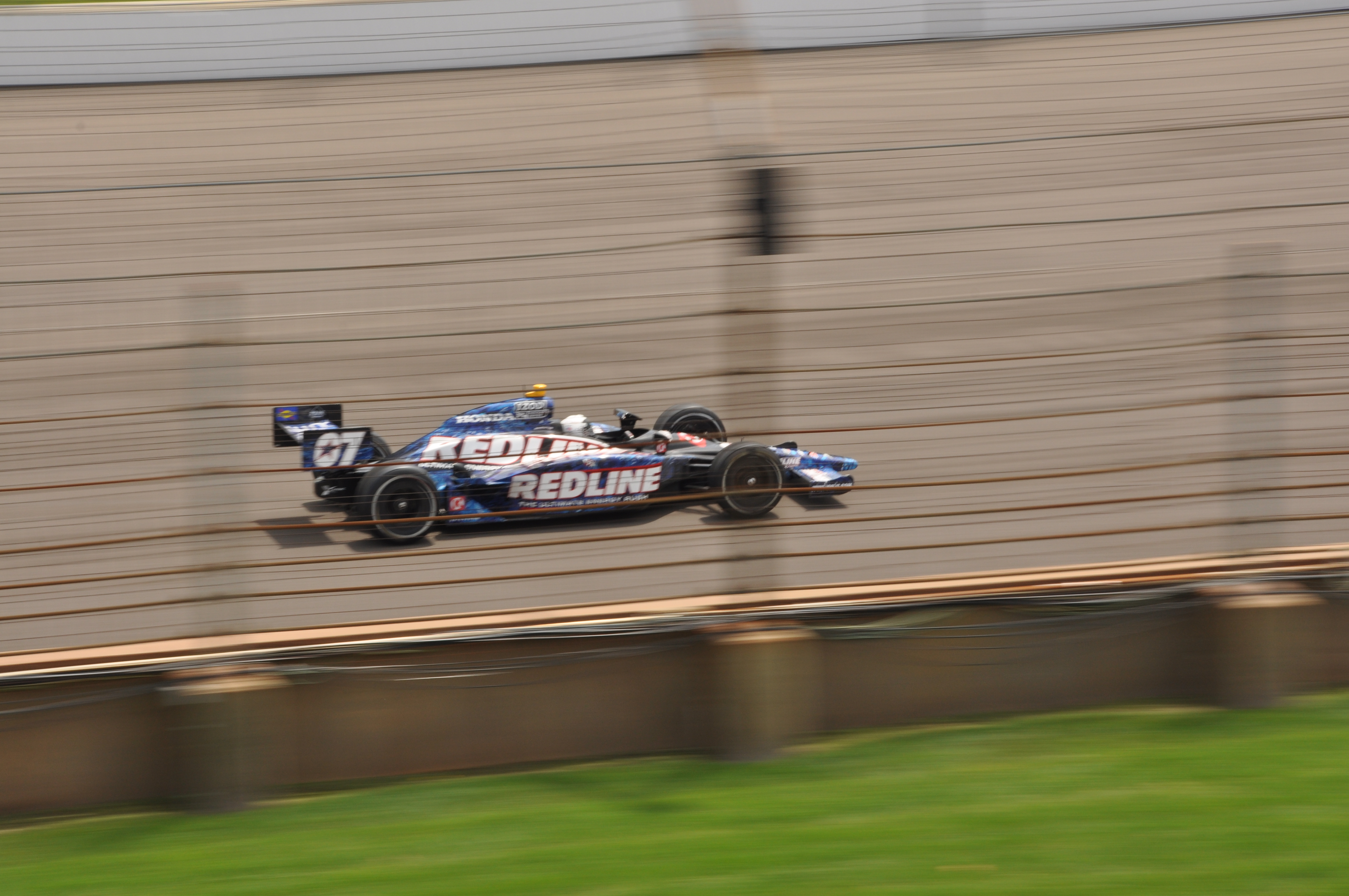
Scheckter competing in the 2011 Indianapolis 500

For 2011, Scheckter joined KV-SH Racing and drive the No. 07 Team Redline Extreme car in the Indianapolis 500. At Loudon, Scheckter would replace the injured Justin Wilson, driving the No. 22 car for Dreyer & Reinbold Racing. Schekter would also drive the No. 07 car in Baltimore. For the season's final race in Las Vegas, Scheckter drove the No. 57 car for Sarah Fisher Racing with Angie's List as the primary sponsor, but the race was red flagged due to a multicar pile up early in the race in which Dan Wheldon was killed.

== Personal life ==
Scheckter is the son of 1979 Formula One World Champion Jody Scheckter and the nephew of racer Ian Scheckter. He also has an older brother named Toby, and a younger brother Hugo, who often updates Tomas's fans through his Twitter page.

In April 2020, Scheckter announced that he had suffered multiple strokes and required a heart operation at the Mayo Clinic. Scheckter currently resides in the United Kingdom.

== Motorsports career results ==
=== Career summary ===
Season	Series	Team	Races	Wins	Poles	F.Laps	Podiums	Points	Position
1998	Formula Vauxhall Junior	John Village Automotive	16	1	1	1	1	112	**3rd**
1998	Formula Renault 2.0 UK Winter Series	Martin Donnelly Racing	4	0	?	?	?	44	6th
1999	EFDA Euroseries	AR Motorsport	20	8	7	?	?	295	**1st**
1999	Euro Open by Nissan	Vergani Racing	2	1	2	0	2	35	12th
2000	International Formula 3000	mySAP.com Team	4	0	0	0	1	6	11th
2000	Italian Formula 3000	ADM Competizione	2	0	0	0	1	6	10th
2000	British Formula Three Championship	Stewart Racing Team	14	2	2	3	7	161	**2nd**
2000	Masters of Formula 3	Stewart Racing Team	1	0	0	0	1	0	**3rd**
2000	Macau Grand Prix	Swiss Racing Team	1	0	0	0	0	0	6th
2000	Korea Super Prix	Swiss Racing Team	1	0	0	0	0	0	7th
2000	French Formula Three Championship		2	0	0	0	0	0	NC
2001	International Formula 3000	European Minardi F3000	1	0	0	0	0	0	NC
2001	Euro Formula 3000	Martello Racing	1	0	0	0	0	0	NC
2001	Open Telefónica by Nissan	Vergani Racing	16	4	8	3	11	196	**2nd**
2001	Formula One	Jaguar Racing	Test Driver						
2002	Indy Racing League	Cheever Racing	12	1	3	6	1	210	14th
2003	IndyCar Series	Chip Ganassi Racing	16	0	2	2	1	356	7th
2004	IndyCar Series	Panther Racing	16	0	0	1	0	230	19th
2005	IndyCar Series	Panther Racing	17	1	3	1	3	390	9th
2005–06	A1 Grand Prix	A1 Team South Africa	4	0	0	0	0	20	17th
2006	IndyCar Series	Vision Racing	14	0	0	1	1	298	10th
2007	IndyCar Series	Vision Racing	14	0	0	0	0	357	10th
2007	Rolex Sports Car Series - DP	Vision Racing	1	0	0	0	0	14	72nd
2008	IndyCar Series	Luczo Dragon Racing	6	0	0	0	0	66	31st
2009	IndyCar Series	Dale Coyne Racing	11	0	0	1	0	195	20th
2010	IndyCar Series	Dreyer & Reinbold Racing	6	0	0	0	0	89	29th
2011	IndyCar Series	Dreyer & Reinbold Racing	3	0	0	0	0	52	32nd

=== Complete Euro Open by Nissan results ===
(key) (Races in bold indicate pole position) (Races in italics indicate fastest lap)

Year	Entrant	1	2	3	4	5	6	7	8	9	10	11	12	13	14	15	16	DC	Points
1999	Vergani Racing	ALB; 1	ALB; 2	JER; 1	JER; 2	JAR; 1	JAR; 2	MNZ; 1	MNZ; 2	JAR; 1	JAR; 2	DON; 1	DON; 2	BAR; 1	BAR; 2	**VAL**; **1**; 1	**VAL**; **2**; 2	12th	35
2001	Vergani Racing	JAR; 1; 10	JAR; 2; 3	**EST**; **1**; 1	**EST**; **2**; 1	ALB; 1; 2	**ALB**; **2**; 2	**VAL**; **1**; 1	VAL; 2; 2	MNZ; 1; 3	MNZ; 2; 2	MAG; 1; 5	MAG; 2; 2	**BAR**; **1**; 1	**BAR**; **2** Ret	**VAL**; **1** Ret	**VAL**; **2**; 9	**2nd**	**185**

=== Complete British Formula Three Championship results ===
(key) (Races in bold indicate pole position) (Races in italics indicate fastest lap)

Year	Entrant	Chassis	Engine	Class	1	2	3	4	5	6	7	8	9	10	11	12	13	14	DC	Points
2000	Stewart Racing	Dallara F399	Mugen-Honda	Championship	**THR**; 2	CRO; 2	OUL; 1	DON; Ret	**DON**; 1	SIL; 4	BRH; 4	DON; 23	DON; 6	CRO; 2	SIL; 4	SNE; 2	SPA; 5	SIL; 3	2nd	161

=== Complete International Formula 3000 results ===
(key) (Races in bold indicate pole position) (Races in italics indicate fastest lap)

Year	Entrant	1	2	3	4	5	6	7	8	9	10	11	12	DC	Points
2000	MySap.com	IMO	SIL	CAT	NÜR	MON	MAG	A1R; 18	HOC; 2	HUN; 21	SPA; DNS			13th	6
2001	European Minardi F3000	INT	IMO	CAT	A1R	MON	NÜR	MAG	SIL	HOC; Ret	HUN	SPA	MNZ	NC	0

=== Complete Italian/Euro Formula 3000 results ===
(key) (Races in bold indicate pole position; races in italics indicate fastest lap)

Year	Entrant	1	2	3	4	5	6	7	8	DC	Points
2000	Da Vinci Team	VLL	MUG	IMO	MNZ; 2	VLL	DON; 8	PER		10th	6
2000	ADM Competizione								MIS; 8	10th	6
2001	Martello Racing	VLL	PER	MNZ	DON	ZOL	IMO	NÜR	VAL; Ret	-	0

=== Complete IndyCar Series results ===
(key) (Races in bold indicate pole position)

Year	Team	No.	Chassis	Engine	1	2	3	4	5	6	7	8	9	10	11	12	13	14	15	16	17	18	19	Rank	Points	Ref
2002	Red Bull Cheever Racing	52	Dallara	Infiniti	HMS; 6	PHX; 24	FON; 24	NZR; 21	INDY; 26	**TXS**; 17	PPIR; 16	RIR; 4	**KAN**; 15	NSH; 13	**MIS**; 1	KTY; 22	STL; DNS	CHI	TX2					14th	210	
2003	Chip Ganassi Racing	10	G-Force	Toyota	HMS; 8	PHX; 15	MOT; 16	INDY; 4	**TXS**; 18	PPIR; 8	RIR; 18	KAN; 9	NSH; 10	**MIS**; 3	STL; 4	KTY; 10	NZR; 19	CHI; 5	FON; 5	TX2; 15				7th	356	
2004	Panther Racing	4	Dallara	Chevrolet	HMS; 5	PHX; 16	MOT; 13	INDY; 18	TXS; 20	RIR; 17	KAN; 15	NSH; 19	MIL; 21	MIS; 19	KTY; 22	PPIR; 17	NZR; 13	CHI; 19	FON; 15	TX2; 18				19th	230	
2005	Panther Racing	4	Dallara	Chevrolet	**HMS**; 11	PHX; 17	STP; 17	MOT; 10	INDY; 20	**TXS**; 1	RIR; 4	KAN; 5	**NSH**; 17	MIL; 3	MIS; 3	KTY; 21	PPIR; 14	SNM; 16	CHI; 4	WGL; 20	FON; 7			9th	390	
2006	Vision Racing	2	Dallara	Honda	HMS; 9	STP; 12	MOT; 13	INDY; 27	WGL; 10	TXS; 10	RIR; 7	KAN; 7	NSH; 15	MIL; 3	MIS; 5	KTY; 7	SNM; 17	CHI; 10						10th	298	
2007	Vision Racing	2	Dallara	Honda	HMS; 8	STP; 6	MOT; 9	KAN; 5	INDY; 7	MIL; 17	TXS; 14	IOW; 19	RIR; 7	WGL; 13	NSH; 11	MDO; 9	MIS; 11	KTY; 5	SNM; 8	DET; 13	CHI; 20			10th	357	
2008	Luczo Dragon Racing	12	Dallara	Honda	HMS	STP	MOT^{1}	LBH^{1}	KAN; 23	INDY; 24	MIL	TXS; 25	IOW	RIR	WGL	NSH	MDO	EDM	KTY	SNM; 27	DET; 21	CHI; 26	SRF^{2}	31st	66	
2009	Dale Coyne Racing	19	Dallara	Honda	STP	LBH	KAN	INDY; 12																20th	195	
2009	Dreyer & Reinbold Racing	23	Dallara	Honda					MIL; 13		IOW; 6	RIR; 11	WGL	TOR; 16	EDM; 19					MOT; 23				20th	195	
2009	Dreyer & Reinbold Racing	43	Dallara	Honda						TXS; 13						KTY; 22	MDO	SNM	CHI; 8		HMS; 9			20th	195	
2010	Dreyer & Reinbold Racing	23	Dallara	Honda	SAO	STP	ALA	LBH	KAN	INDY; 15														29th	89	
2010	Dreyer & Reinbold Racing	24	Dallara	Honda							TXS; 13	IOW	WGL	TOR; 15	EDM; 19	MDO	SNM							29th	89	
2010	Conquest Racing	36	Dallara	Honda														CHI; 28	KTY; 14	MOT	HMS			29th	89	
2011	SH Racing KV Racing Technology	07	Dallara	Honda	STP	ALA	LBH	SAO	INDY; 8	TXS	TX2	MIL	IOW	TOR	EDM	MDO								32nd	52	
2011	Dreyer & Reinbold Racing	22	Dallara	Honda													NHM; 23	SNM						32nd	52	
2011	SH Racing Dreyer & Reinbold Racing	07	Dallara	Honda															BAL; 22	MOT	KTY			32nd	52	
2011	Sarah Fisher Racing	57	Dallara	Honda																		LVS; C		32nd	52	

^{1} Run on same day.
^{2} Non-points-paying, exhibition race.

Years	Teams	Races	Poles	Wins	Podiums (Non-win)	Top 10s (Non-podium)	Indianapolis 500 Wins	Championships
10	8	117	8	2	4	38	0	0

==== Indianapolis 500 ====
Year	Chassis	Engine	Start	Finish	Team	Notes
2002	Dallara	Infiniti	10	26	Team Cheever	Led most laps, crashed in Turn 4
2003	G-Force	Toyota	12	4	Chip Ganassi Racing	Led the most laps
2004	Dallara	Chevrolet	10	18	Panther Racing	Running
2005	Dallara	Chevrolet	11	20	Panther Racing	Accident
2006	Dallara	Honda	11	27	Vision Racing	Accident
2007	Dallara	Honda	10	7	Vision Racing	Running
2008	Dallara	Honda	11	24	Luczo Dragon Racing	Mechanical failure
2009	Dallara	Honda	26	12	Dale Coyne Racing	Running
2010	Dallara	Honda	20	15	Dreyer & Reinbold Racing	Led 5 laps
2011	Dallara	Honda	21	8	SH Racing/KVRT	Running

Scheckter started on the fourth row of the Indy 500 his first seven races until 2009, when he qualified 26th.

=== Complete A1 Grand Prix results ===
(key) (Races in bold indicate pole position) (Races in italics indicate fastest lap)

Year	Entrant	1	2	3	4	5	6	7	8	9	10	11	12	13	14	15	16	17	18	19	20	21	22	DC	Points
2005–06	A1 Team South Africa	GBR; SPR	GBR; FEA	GER; SPR; 12	GER; FEA; Ret	POR; SPR; 10	POR; FEA; Ret	AUS; SPR	AUS; FEA	MYS; SPR	MYS; FEA	UAE; SPR	UAE; FEA	RSA; SPR	RSA; FEA	IDN; SPR	IDN; FEA	MEX; SPR	MEX; FEA	USA; SPR	USA; FEA	CHN; SPR	CHN; FEA	17th	20

== See also ==
- List of select Jewish racing drivers

Awards and achievements
Preceded by Hélio Castroneves	Indianapolis 500; Rookie of the Year (with Alex Barron); 2002	Succeeded by Toranosuke Takagi
