= 2002 Formula Nissan 2000 Series =

2002 Formula Nissan 2000 season

Seasons
- ← 2001 2003 →

The 2002 Formula Nissan 2000 season was contested over seven race weekends with 14 races. In this one-make formula all drivers had to use Coloni CN1/C chassis and Nissan engines used on the previous 2001 Open Telefónica by Nissan season. Twelve different teams and 25 drivers competed with the titles going to Spanish driver Santiago Porteiro and Spanish team Meycom.

== Teams and drivers ==
All teams used the Coloni CN1/C chassis and Nissan engines.

Team	No.	Driver	Rounds
(France) Epsilon by Graff	1	(Austria) Matthias Lauda	All
(France) Epsilon by Graff	2	(Spain) Celso Míguez	All
(France) Epsilon by Graff	3	(Spain) Gelete Nieto	All
(Italy) Vergani Racing	4	(Italy) Matteo Bobbi	All
(Italy) Vergani Racing	5	(Venezuela) Milka Duno	1–3, 5–7
(Spain) Meycom	6	(Spain) Juan Antonio del Pino	All
(Spain) Meycom	7	(Spain) Santiago Porteiro	All
(Italy) Venturini Racing	8	(Italy) Giorgio Sernagiotto	1–4
(Italy) Venturini Racing	8	(Spain) Borja García	5–7
(Italy) Venturini Racing	9	(Portugal) Paulo Alho	All
(Spain) Escuela Lois Circuit	10	(Spain) Borja García	1–4
(Spain) Escuela Lois Circuit	10	(Spain) Adrián Vallés	5–7
(Spain) Escuela Lois Circuit	11	(Spain) José Maria Pérez Aicart	All
(Spain) Skualo Competición	12	(Spain) Sergei Yborra	All
(Spain) Skualo Competición	14	(Spain) Antonio Orol	1–4
(Spain) Skualo Competición	14	(Spain) Emilio de Villota Jr.	5–6
(Spain) BCN Competicion	15	(Italy) Andrea Belicchi	2–7
(Spain) BCN Competicion	16	(Spain) Carlos Martin	4–7
(Spain) Team Elias	17	(Spain) Ricardo Ferrando Vicente	1–2
(Spain) Fajas	18	(Spain) Abel Fajas	1–2
(Spain) Auto Planet	18	(Spain) Diego Puyo	6
(Spain) Auto Planet	18	(Spain) Javier Sosa	7
(Spain) CMC Albacete	19	(Spain) Fernando Navarrete	1–5
(Spain) CMC Albacete	20	(Spain) Pedro Muñoz	1–5
(Italy) CiBiEmme Team	21	(Italy) Michele Rugolo	4–7

== Race calendar and results ==
Round		Location	Circuit	Date	Pole position	Fastest lap	Winning driver	Winning team
1	R1	Valencia, Spain	Circuit de Valencia	12 May	(Spain) Juan Antonio del Pino	(Italy) Matteo Bobbi	(Italy) Matteo Bobbi	(Italy) Vergani Racing
1	R2	Valencia, Spain	Circuit de Valencia	12 May	(Spain) Celso Míguez	(Spain) Santiago Porteiro	(Spain) Santiago Porteiro	(Spain) Meycom
2	R1	Madrid, Spain	Circuito del Jarama	9 June	(Italy) Matteo Bobbi	(Spain) Santiago Porteiro	(Italy) Matteo Bobbi	(Italy) Vergani Racing
2	R2	Madrid, Spain	Circuito del Jarama	9 June	(Italy) Matteo Bobbi	(Spain) Santiago Porteiro	(Italy) Matteo Bobbi	(Italy) Vergani Racing
3	R1	Albacete, Spain	Circuito de Albacete	23 June	(Portugal) Paulo Alho	(Spain) Santiago Porteiro	(Spain) José Manuel Pérez-Aicart	(Spain) Escuela Lois
3	R2	Albacete, Spain	Circuito de Albacete	23 June	(Italy) Matteo Bobbi	(Spain) José Manuel Pérez-Aicart	(Spain) José Manuel Pérez-Aicart	(Spain) Escuela Lois
4	R1	Monza, Italy	Autodromo Nazionale Monza	7 July	(Italy) Andrea Belicchi	(Spain) Santiago Porteiro	(Spain) Santiago Porteiro	(Spain) Meycom
4	R2	Monza, Italy	Autodromo Nazionale Monza	7 July	(Italy) Andrea Belicchi	(Spain) Santiago Porteiro	(Spain) Santiago Porteiro	(Spain) Meycom
5	R1	Magny-Cours, France	Circuit de Nevers Magny-Cours	1 September	(Italy) Matteo Bobbi	(Italy) Matteo Bobbi	(Spain) Borja García	(Spain) Escuela Lois
5	R2	Magny-Cours, France	Circuit de Nevers Magny-Cours	1 September	(Italy) Matteo Bobbi	(Italy) Matteo Bobbi	(Italy) Andrea Belicchi	(Spain) BCN Competicion
6	R1	Montmeló, Spain	Circuit de Catalunya	29 September	(Spain) Borja García	(Spain) Borja García	(Spain) Borja García	(Spain) Escuela Lois
6	R2	Montmeló, Spain	Circuit de Catalunya	29 September	(Spain) Adrián Vallés	(Italy) Matteo Bobbi	(Italy) Matteo Bobbi	(Italy) Vergani Racing
7	R1	Valencia, Spain	Circuit de Valencia	20 October	(Spain) José Manuel Pérez-Aicart	(Italy) Matteo Bobbi	(Spain) Santiago Porteiro	(Spain) Meycom
7	R2	Valencia, Spain	Circuit de Valencia	20 October	(Italy) Matteo Bobbi	(Italy) Matteo Bobbi	(Italy) Matteo Bobbi	(Italy) Vergani Racing

=== Final points standings ===
For every race the points were awarded: 15 points to the winner, 12 for runner-up, 10 for third place, 8 for fourth place, 6 for fifth place, winding down to 1 point for 10th place. Lower placed drivers did not award points. Additional points were awarded to the driver setting the fastest race lap (2 points).

- Points System:

Pos	1	2	3	4	5	6	7	8	9	10	FL
Pts	20	15	12	10	8	6	4	3	2	1	2

Pos	Driver	VAL (Spain)		JAR (Spain)		ALB (Spain)		MNZ (Italy)		MAG (France)		CAT (Spain)		VAL (Spain)		Points
1	(Spain) Santiago Porteiro	Ret	1	12	2	2	3	1	1	Ret	3	Ret	4	1	DNS	168
2	(Italy) Matteo Bobbi	1	3	1	1	10	5	5	Ret	Ret	1	Ret	1	2	1	167
3	(Spain) Borja García	2	5	2	4	Ret	9	4	7	1	Ret	1	9	3	2	131
4	(Spain) José Maria Pérez Aicart	5	2	3	8	1	1	7	Ret	14	4	2	2	Ret	8	122
5	(Italy) Andrea Belicchi			8	6	4	4	3	2	2	2	4	6	6	6	105
6	(Spain) Celso Míguez	8	6	4	5	3	2	8	Ret	3	8	5	5	4	Ret	84
7	(Spain) Juan Antonio del Pino	3	4	14	3	7	6	Ret	5	4	6	3	7	Ret	DNS	84
8	(Portugal) Paulo Alho	6	Ret	6	Ret	Ret	8	6	4	7	5	7	8	7	4	64
9	(Spain) Fernando Navarrete	4	7	5	9	8	7	2	6	8	DNS					55
10	(Spain) Adrián Vallés									6	Ret	6	3	9	3	38
11	(Italy) Giorgio Sernagiotto	7	9	10	Ret	5	Ret	Ret	3							27
12	(Austria) Matthias Lauda	Ret	8	7	Ret	Ret	Ret	12	10	5	12	Ret	Ret	8	7	23
13	(Italy) Michele Rugolo							10	Ret	Ret	7	11	11	5	5	21
14	(Spain) Gelete Nieto	10	10	Ret	7	6	10	Ret	Ret	9	9	8	Ret	Ret	12	20
15	(Spain) Sergei Yborra	9	12	9	12	9	11	9	9	10	10	12	10	Ret	9	15
16	(Spain) Carlos Martin							14	DNS	13	14	9	12	10	10	4
17	(Spain) Pedro Muñoz	Ret	13	Ret	11	Ret	Ret	11	8	Ret	13					3
18	(Venezuela) Milka Duno	11	11	11	10	Ret	12			11	11	12	13	11	11	1
19	(Spain) Diego Puyo											10	Ret			1
20	(Spain) Emilio de Villota Jr.									12	Ret	Ret	Ret			0
21	(Spain) Antonio Orol	Ret	Ret	13	Ret	Ret	DNS	13	DNS							0
22	(Spain) Javier Sosa													13	13	0
	(Spain) Abel Fajas	Ret	Ret	Ret	Ret											
	(Spain) Ricardo Ferrando Vicente	Ret	Ret	Ret	Ret											
