= 2010 Honda Indy Edmonton =

(Canada) 2010 Honda Indy Edmonton
Race details
- 11th round of the 2010 IndyCar Series season
- Date: July 25, 2010
- Official name: Honda Indy Edmonton
- Location: Edmonton City Centre Airport, Edmonton, Alberta, Canada
- Course: Temporary street circuit 1.973 mi / 3.154 km
- Distance: 95 laps 187.435 mi / 299.630 km
- Weather: Temperatures reaching up to 27.5 °C (81.5 °F), with wind speeds up to 19.0 kilometres per hour (11.8 mph)

Pole position
- Driver: (Australia) Will Power (Team Penske)
- Time: 1:00.7126

Fastest lap
- Driver: (New Zealand) Scott Dixon (Chip Ganassi Racing)
- Time: 1:02.1277 (on lap 88 of 95)

Podium
- First: (New Zealand) Scott Dixon (Chip Ganassi Racing)
- Second: (Australia) Will Power (Team Penske)
- Third: (United Kingdom) Dario Franchitti (Chip Ganassi Racing)

The 2010 Honda Indy Edmonton was an IndyCar race that took place on July 25, 2010, at Edmonton City Centre Airport in Edmonton, Alberta, Canada. It was the 11th round of the 2010 IndyCar Series, the third Edmonton Indy in the series, and the race's sixth anniversary (including three years on the Champ Car World Series (CCWS) schedule). Chip Ganassi Racing driver Scott Dixon won the 95-lap race after starting third. Team Penske's Will Power finished second, and Dixon's teammate Dario Franchitti finished third.

Going into the race, Power, the defending Indy Edmonton champion, led the Drivers' Championship. Power took pole position by posting the fastest qualifying lap. Power led for the majority of the race, but was passed by teammate Hélio Castroneves with 18 laps left. On the race's final restart, lap 92, Power attempted to retake the lead from Castroneves, but the latter defended his position and was penalised with a drive-through penalty. He declined to serve the penalty and was demoted to tenth place, while Dixon was awarded the victory.

During the race, there were four cautions and four lead changes among three different drivers. It was Dixon's second win of the season and his 23rd of his career. With six races remaining in the season, Power's lead in the Drivers' Championship increased to 50 points over Franchitti and 71 points over Dixon.

== Background ==
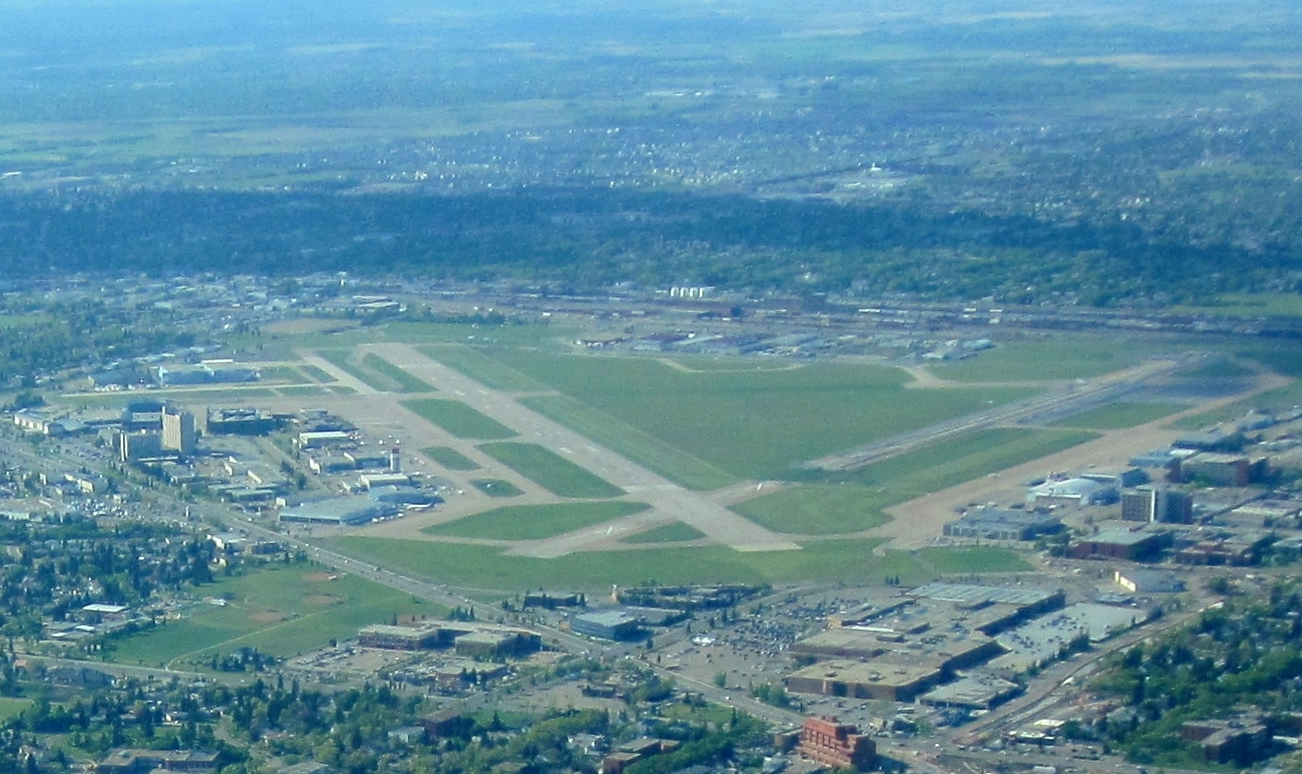
Edmonton City Centre Airport, where the race was held.

The Honda Indy Edmonton was confirmed as part of the Indy Racing League's (IRL) 2010 schedule for the IndyCar Series in December 2009, after Edmonton City Council voted to keep the race on the calendar despite losing $9.2 million in the previous two seasons. It was the third year in a row that the race was held in the series, and the sixth Edmonton Indy since 2005, when it was a Champ Car World Series (CCWS) event for three years. It was the second consecutive round held in Canada, following the Honda Indy Toronto the previous week. Tire supplier Firestone brought the black-sidewall "Primary" and red-banded "Alternate" tire compounds and grooved rain tires to the race.

Prior to the race, Team Penske driver Will Power led the points standings with 377 points, with Dario Franchitti 42 points back in second and Scott Dixon third. Ryan Briscoe was fourth with 292 points, and Ryan Hunter-Reay was fifth, six points behind. Having dominated the 2009 Indy Edmonton, Power said he felt he could repeat the success and believed it would be "very competitive" in the qualifying session and "very tough" in the race. Franchitti said he wanted to return to championship contention after retiring with a gearbox problem in the Iowa Corn Indy 250 and hoped for a good performance in Edmonton with seven races remaining in the season (two on road courses and four on oval tracks) after the race. Power's teammate Hélio Castroneves said it was going to be difficult to catch up to his teammate because of his recent form but that "we just need to go out and win a couple races and see what happens."

== Practice and qualifying ==
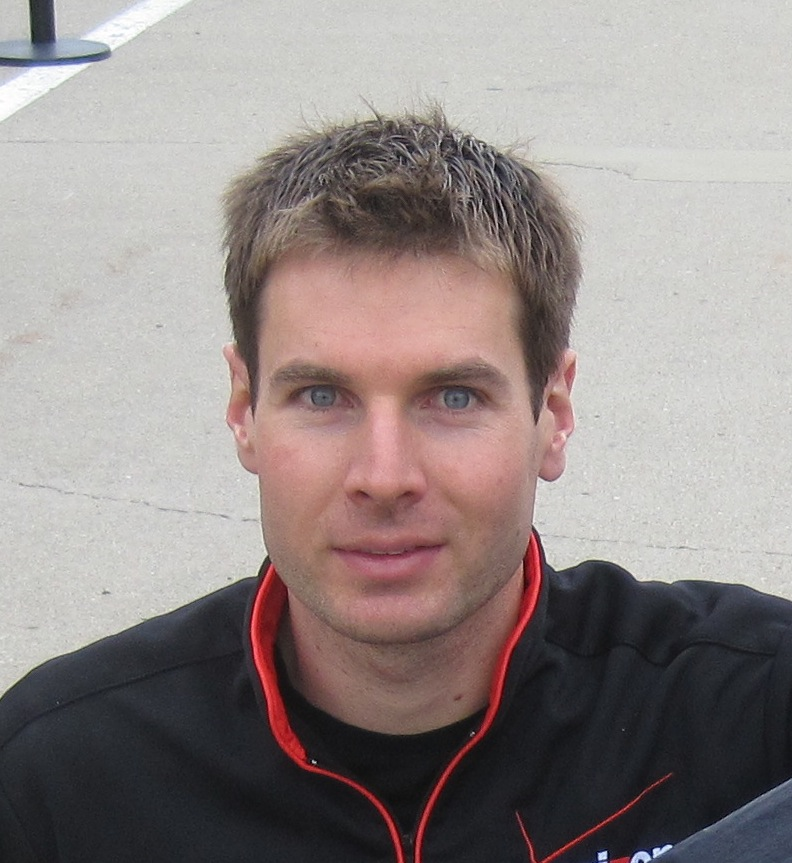
Will Power had the sixth pole position of the 2010 season.

There were three one hour practice sessions on Friday and Saturday morning preceding the race. Franchitti was fastest in the first practice session with a time of 1:03.0885; Dixon was second and Power third. Castroneves was fourth-fastest, ahead of Justin Wilson, Paul Tracy. Ryan Briscoe, Ryan Hunter-Reay, E. J. Viso and Takuma Sato in positions two to ten. The session was stopped twice: once for Milka Duno, who lost control of her car and collided with the turn ten tire barrier, damaging her front wing, and again for Bertrand Baguette, who spun after hitting a chicane kerb and driving through an advertising hoarding. In the second practise session, Power set the day's fastest time of with a lap of 1:01.6689, followed by teammates Briscoe and Castroneves. Franchitti finished fourth, Sato fifth, and Dixon sixth. Wilson, Viso, Tracy, and Tony Kanaan rounded out the top ten. Three caution flags came out; Baugette crashed, Duno stalled after she spun and Tomas Scheckter slid into a tire barrier.

In the final practice session, Castroneves set the fastest lap time of 1:01.6642, ahead of Team Penske teammates Power and Briscoe. Hideki Mutoh was fourth, Dixon fifth, and Tracy sixth. Wilson was seventh fastest, Kanaan eighth, Marco Andretti ninth, and Sato tenth. Several drivers experienced high-speed spins without causing damage to their vehicles, prompting the display of caution flags. Tracy and Alex Tagliani both spun in the first turn, causing a stoppage; Tracy narrowly avoided colliding with Baguette, who was exiting the pit lane.

Qualifying used the standard road and street course system, with the field divided into two groups. All cars were divided into two groups of twelve, with the top six from each group qualifying for the "Top 12" session. The "Firestone Fast Six" were formed from the fastest six runners in this session. The fastest driver in the final session took pole position, with the remaining competitors lining up in session order, regardless of qualifying times. (Fast Six from one to six, Top 12 from seven to twelve, and Round 1 from 13 to 24, with Group 1 drivers in the odd-numbered grid positions and Group 2 drivers taking the even-numbered starting positions). Duno was barred from qualifying because her practice lap times did not meet the required performance standards, but she was permitted to start the race. Power led the first group of twelve runners, nearly three-tenths of a second faster than teammate Briscoe, with Castroneves third. Other drivers who advanced to the second qualifying session were Franchitti, Wilson, and Raphael Matos, who secured his best qualifying result of the season with 10th. Simona de Silvestro set her fastest lap of the day in the second group of twelve drivers. The other top six competitors were Hunter-Reay, Dixon, Viso, Mutoh, and Scheckter, who advanced to the second qualifying round. Power set the fastest lap time in the Top 12, beating teammate Castroneves and Dixon. Briscoe, Franchitti, and Viso finished fourth to sixth, making up the other half of the Fast Six. With a time of 1:00.7126, Power secured his sixth pole position of the season, his eighth in the IndyCar Series and 13th in top-level Indy car racing. Castroneves, who had the pole position until Power's lap, joined him on the grid's front row. Dixon and Franchitti of Chip Ganassi Racing (CGR) finished third and fourth, respectively, with Briscoe taking fifth ahead of Viso.

=== Qualifying classification ===
Bold text indicates the fastest lap of each group.

Qualifying results
Pos	No.	Driver	Team	Group 1	Group 2	Top 12	Fast 6
1	12	Will Power (AUS)	Team Penske	**1:00.9285**		**1:01.0731**	**1:00.7126**
2	3	Hélio Castroneves (BRA)	Team Penske	1:01.5903		1:01.2138	1:00.7891
3	9	Scott Dixon (NZL)	Chip Ganassi Racing		1:01.8583	1:01.2329	1:01.2395
4	10	Dario Franchitti (GBR)	Chip Ganassi Racing	1:01.7341		1:01.3530	1:01.2481
5	6	Ryan Briscoe (AUS)	Team Penske	1:01.2556		1:01.2349	1:01.3799
6	8	E. J. Viso (VEN)	KV Racing Technology		1:01.9084	1:01.4394	1:01.6122
7	78	Simona de Silvestro (SUI)	HVM Racing		**1:01.7385**	1:01.5438	
8	37	Ryan Hunter-Reay (USA)	Andretti Autosport		1:01.8249	1:01.5596	
9	22	Justin Wilson (GBR)	Dreyer & Reinbold Racing	1:01.7594		1:01.5887	
10	2	Raphael Matos (BRA)	De Ferran Dragon Racing	1:01.8319		1:01.7015	
11	06	Hideki Mutoh (JPN)	Newman/Haas Racing		1:02.0307	1:02.1935	
12	24	Tomas Scheckter (RSA)	Dreyer & Reinbold Racing		1:02.1022	1:02.9751	
13	5	Takuma Sato (JPN)	KV Racing Technology	1:01.9181			
14	32	Mario Moraes (BRA)	KV Racing Technology		1:02.1324		
15	15	Paul Tracy (CAN)	KV Racing Technology	1:02.3264			
16	26	Marco Andretti (USA)	Andretti Autosport		1:02.1465		
17	34	Mario Romancini (BRA)	Conquest Racing	1:02.4191			
18	19	Alex Lloyd (GBR)	Dale Coyne Racing		1:02.2203		
19	77	Alex Tagliani (CAN)	FAZZT Race Team	1:02.5240			
20	36	Bertrand Baguette (BEL)	Conquest Racing		1:02.5193		
21	7	Danica Patrick (USA)	Andretti Autosport	1:02.5795			
22	4	Dan Wheldon (GBR)	Panther Racing		1:02.7397		
23	14	Vítor Meira (BRA)	A. J. Foyt Enterprises	1:02.7511			
24	11	Tony Kanaan (BRA)	Andretti Autosport		no time		
25	18	Milka Duno (VEN)	Dale Coyne Racing	no time			

== Warm-up ==
The drivers took to the track at 10:00 AM (UTC−06:00) for a 30-minute warm-up session. Power set the fastest lap of the session of 1:01.8397. Dixon was second-fastest. Team Penske teammates Castroneves and Briscoe completed the top four.

== Race ==
The race began at 4:00 p.m. local time, and was televised live in the United States on Versus. The weather was sunny and mild at the start of the race, with air temperatures ranging from 76 to 78 °F (24 to 26 °C) and track temperatures ranging from 102 and 111 °F (39 and 44 °C). Power maintained his lead into the first turn. Duno spun off the track at the start, but no caution was issued. De Silvestro passed Viso for sixth place on the same lap. Power led Castroneves at the end of the first lap, with Dixon, Franchitti, Briscoe, de Silvestro, Viso, Hunter-Reay, Wilson, and Matos completing the top ten. The top five drivers began to distance themselves from the rest of the field. Tracy collided with the rear of Matos' car in turn two on lap two, sending Matos spinning into the infield grass and the latter driving cautiously to the pit lane with a flat left-rear tire. Scheckter's front wing was damaged on lap 10, prompting him make a pit stop for a replacement nose cone. After starting 15th, Tracy drove aggressively and moved to 10th by the 20th lap.

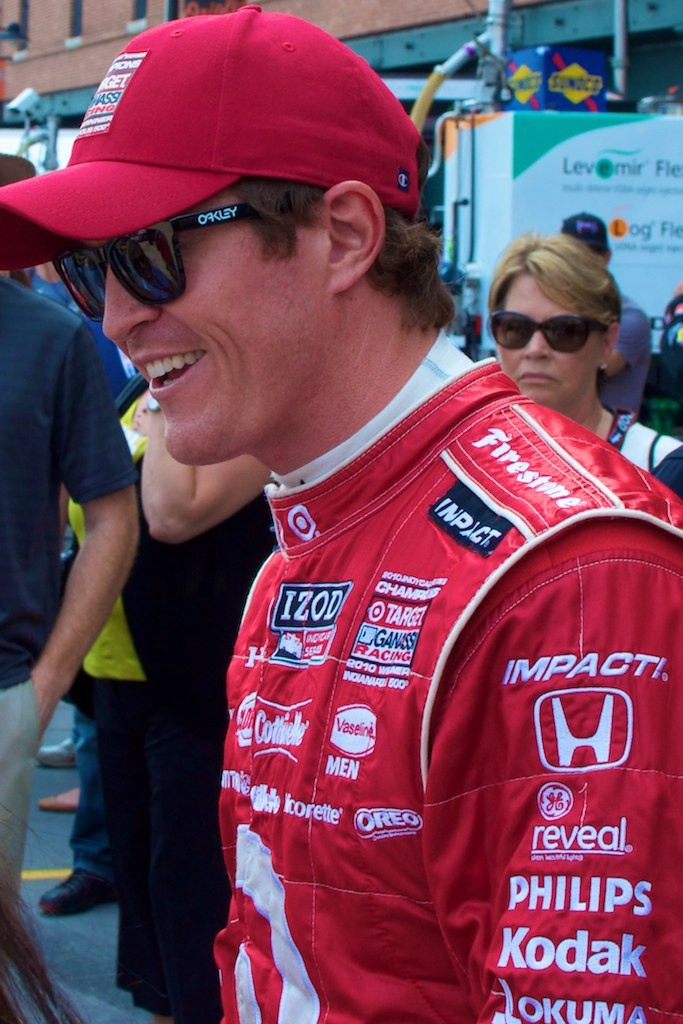
Scott Dixon (pictured in 2011) won the race after Hélio Castroneves was demoted for blocking Will Power.

Briscoe passed the CGR drivers on lap 29 after they were delayed by slower cars. Four laps later, green-flag pit stops began. Wilson spun under braking on the 36th lap at the end of the backstretch at turn ten due to a right-rear shock absorber failure and drove slowly to his pit box to repair damage to his vehicle. On lap 39, Danica Patrick attempted to pass Baugette on the inside, but lost control of her car and ran wide into the infield grass, rejoining the circuit in 17th without damaing her suspension. On lap 46, Andretti's front wing separated while baulking four cars, and Scheckter ran wide as the four cars passed Andretti. On the following lap, Alex Lloyd spun into the grass and stalled his engine, necessitating the event's first full course caution. During the caution, Andretti made a pit stop for a replacement front wing. The race resumed on lap 51, with Power leading Castroneves, Briscoe, and Dixon. Soon after, going into turn 11, de Silvestro was hit from behind by Viso, who overheated his brakes and crashed into the turn one tire barrier, prompting the second caution. On the same lap, Viso avoided hitting teammate Tracy (who took evasive action).

Viso received a drive-through penalty and rejoined in tenth place. On the lap 54 restart, Power maintained his lead. The third caution of the race was issued shortly after the restart when Kanaan made light contact with the side of Tagliani, who spun in turn three. Mario Romancini was blinded by smoke from the incident and was hit by the recovering Tagliani. Both cars were severely damaged and retired; Kanaan was able to continue without apparent damage. At the lap 58 restart, Power led the field. Briscoe fell behind the two CGR drivers, while Tracy moved to sixth place, passing Hunter-Reay. The second (and final) round of green-flag pit stops began on the 63rd lap; Tracy and Hunter-Reay made pit stops over the next five laps in the hope that a caution flag would be displayed, allowing them to lead the race. After the pit stops, Power (on the Alternate tires) remained the race leader over Castroneves and Dixon.

On the 77th lap, Power and teammate Castroneves (on the Primary tires) encountered slower cars, and the latter took advantage of the situation to overtake Power for the lead. Castroneves began to pull away from Power. Ten laps later, de Silvestro's engine shut down because her car ran out of fuel and pulled over to the side of the track onto the infield grass to retire from the race, prompting the fourth (and final) caution. The caution mandated each driver to reduce their speed and remain in formation. At the start of lap 92, the pace car drove into the pit lane, resuming the race. At the first turn's entrance, Power moved to the outside lane and almost lost control of his car on the dirty part of the track after using his push-to-pass system early. His teammate Castroneves drove left to widen his arc into turn one. Race control, however, interpreted this as a blocking manoeuvre. Castroneves accelerated out of the corner, causing Power to go wide. Dixon took advantage of the situation to pass Power on his right and move into second place through turn two. Franchitti attempted to pass Power into turn three but ran wide onto the dirty side of the track and was unsuccessful. The move was immediately reviewed by IndyCar chief steward and competition president Brian Barnhart, which resulted in him issuing the black flag to Castroneves for being deemed to have blocked Power a minute later. Castroneves was informed of a drive-through penalty, which required him to enter the pit lane on his next lap at 60 mph (97 km/h), but chose to remain on the track for the final two laps and crossed the start-finish line first on the road.

Dixon was awarded his second victory of the season and 23rd of his career because Castroneves did not take his penalty and was penalized 20 seconds. Power was second, 2.67 seconds adrift, with Franchitti third. Briscoe finished fourth despite damaging his rear suspension early in the race, and Hunter-Reay held off Tracy to finish fifth. Moraes, Viso, and Sato finished seventh through ninth, with Castroneves demoted to tenth, the last driver on the lead lap. There were four cautions and four lead changes among three different drivers during the race.

=== Post-race ===
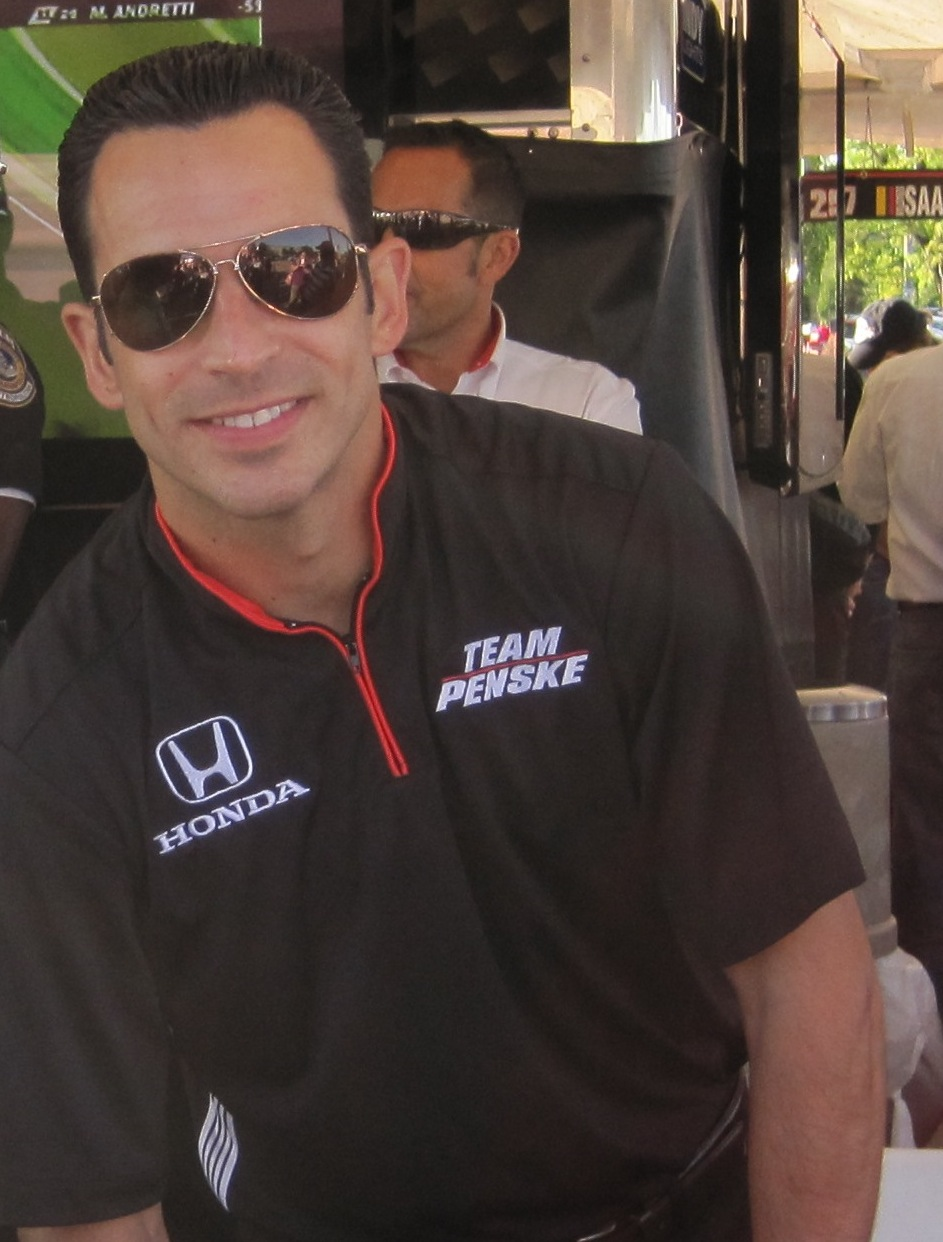
Hélio Castroneves was demoted to tenth after he was judged to have blocked Will Power.

Castroneves was enraged by the penalty and jumped out of his car, yelled angrily at the flagman (seeking an explanation), and grabbed Head of Security Charles Burns as he sought an explanation before he was restrained and led away by others. He argued he had not changed his line: "I actually gave him room outside. When you go side by side like that with your teammate and the guy [Barnhart] has just swept ... literally, literally just takes it away from you ... it's just absurd." The IRL fined Castroneves $60,000 for "unsportsmanlike conduct" and placed him on probation for the remainder of the season. IndyCar CEO Randy Bernard later revealed that the series considered suspending Castroneves but decided against it due to his popularity among the series' fanbase and his overall reputation for professionalism and friendliness. Castroneves later apologized for his actions but continued to object to the penalty. Castroneves' block was compared to his manoeuvre against Wilson in the 2008 Detroit Indy Grand Prix. Gordon Kirby of Motor Sport Magazine opined that Castroneves' move was fair and sportsmanlike and noted that several fans perceived it as "good, hard racing".

Dixon said of his victory: "It's not a way you want to win for sure. When I win, I want to win being faster or putting a good pass on someone. But the way our season is going, I'll be taking anything at the moment." Power, who finished second, said it was a good finish in terms of points. Franchitti said of his attempted pass on Power late in the race: "Scott created the hole and I tried to get through it. It was close, I'm talking about a foot or two. We came up a foot short of making that move happen." Tracy commented on his sixth-place finish: "Coming from 15th to finish sixth feels very good. I just wish we could've got the car figured out earlier in the weekend and got a better starting spot. I think we can race with the leaders if we can do that." Tagliani stated his belief his team could have achieved a top-ten result had he not been hit by Kanaan, "I'm disappointed. The whole FAZZT team is disappointed." De Silvestro said Viso had attempted "an impossible move" that was "a bit stupid" but thought of achieving a decent result before her retirement from the race.

In February 2011, Tony Cotman, the circuit's design consultant, announced that the track would be improved and lengthened for that year. In order to try and create more excitement, he said that the track layout be moved to the City Centre Airport's Eastern runway. The result of the alterations would be an additional 0.3 miles (0.48 km) of track, creating a 2.2-mile (3.5 km) circuit. By finishing second, Power increased his points lead over Franchitti to 50 and 71 to Dixon. Briscoe and Hunter-Reay held on to fourth and fifth place, respectively.

=== Race classification ===
Race results
Pos	No.	Driver	Team	Laps	Time/Retired	Points
1	9	Scott Dixon (NZL)	Chip Ganassi Racing	95	1:50:37.0551	50
2	12	Will Power (AUS)	Team Penske	95	1:50:38.7239	43
3	10	Dario Franchitti (GBR)	Target Chip Ganassi Racing	95	1:50:40.3382	35
4	6	Ryan Briscoe (AUS)	Team Penske	95	1:50:45.9203	32
5	37	Ryan Hunter-Reay (USA)	Andretti Autosport	95	1:50:48.2033	30
6	15	Paul Tracy (CAN)	KV Racing Technology	95	1:50:48.9642	28
7	32	Mario Moraes (BRA)	KV Racing Technology	95	1:50:53.9566	26
8	8	E. J. Viso (VEN)	KV Racing Technology	95	1:50:55.2757	24
9	5	Takuma Sato (JPN)	KV Racing Technology	95	1:50:58.6431	22
10	3	Hélio Castroneves (BRA)	Team Penske	95	1:51:39.6562	20
11	26	Marco Andretti (USA)	Andretti Autosport	94	+1 lap	19
12	11	Tony Kanaan (BRA)	Andretti Autosport	94	+1 lap	18
13	2	Raphael Matos (BRA)	De Ferran Dragon Racing	94	+1 lap	17
14	36	Bertrand Baguette (BEL)	Conquest Racing	84	+1 lap	16
15	7	Danica Patrick (USA)	Andretti Autosport	94	+1 lap	15
16	14	Vítor Meira (BRA)	A. J. Foyt Enterprises	93	+2 laps	14
17	06	Hideki Mutoh (JPN)	Newman/Haas Racing	93	+2 laps	13
18	19	Alex Lloyd (GBR)	Dale Coyne Racing	92	+3 laps	12
19	24	Tomas Scheckter (RSA)	Dreyer & Reinbold Racing	90	+5 laps	12
20	4	Dan Wheldon (GBR)	Panther Racing	90	+5 laps	12
21	22	Justin Wilson (GBR)	Dreyer & Reinbold Racing	88	+7 laps	12
22	78	Simona de Silvestro (SUI)	HVM Racing	87	Out of Fuel	12
23	77	Alex Tagliani (CAN)	FAZZT Race Team	52	Contact	12
24	34	Mario Romancini (BRA)	Conquest Racing	52	Contact	12
25	18	Milka Duno (VEN)	Dale Coyne Racing	4	Handling	10

== Standings after the race ==
Drivers' Championship standings
Pos	+/–	Driver	Points
1		Will Power (AUS)	420
2		Dario Franchitti (GBR)	370 (−50)
3		Scott Dixon (NZL)	349 (−71)
4		Ryan Briscoe (AUS)	324 (−96)
5		Ryan Hunter-Reay (USA)	316 (−104)

- Note: Only the top five positions are included for the drivers' standings.

Previous race: 2010 Honda Indy Toronto	IndyCar Series; 2010 season	Next race: 2010 Honda Indy 200
Previous race: 2009 Rexall Edmonton Indy	2010 Honda Indy Edmonton	Next race: 2011 Edmonton Indy
