= Celso Míguez =

Spanish racing driver

- Nationality: (Spain) Spanish
- Full name: Celso Míguez Pereira
- Born: 1 May 1982 (age 44) Pontevedra, Spain

European F3 Open Championship career
- Current team: Drivex
- Car number: 9

Celso Míguez Pereira (Note: In this Spanish name, the first or paternal surname is Míguez and the second or maternal family name is Pereira.) (born 1 May 1982 in Pontevedra, Galicia) is a Spanish former racing driver. He has competed in events such as the 2006 Formula Renault 3.5 World Series and 2007 Euroseries 3000.

Míguez was runner-up to Bruno Méndez in the 2009 European F3 Open season and collected five wins over the course of the races. In 2010, he raced in the Superleague Formula for Olympique Lyonnais.

== Racing record ==
=== Career summary ===
Season	Series	Team	Races	Wins	Poles	F.Laps	Podiums	Points	Position
2002	Spanish Formula Three Championship	GTA Motor Competición	6	0	0	0	0	43	13th
2002	Formula Nissan 2000 Series	Epsilon by Graff	14	0	1	0	3	84	6th
2003	World Series Lights	Meycom	16	0	1	0	4	112	5th
2004	Spanish Formula Three Championship	Meycom	2	0	1	0	1	0	NC
2004	World Series Lights	Meycom	14	3	3	3	9	145	2nd
2005	Formula Renault 3.5 Series	Pons Racing	17	0	0	0	0	15	19th
2006	Formula Renault 3.5 Series	Pons Racing	17	0	0	0	0	11	24th
2007	Formula Renault 3.5 Series	EuroInternational	5	0	0	0	0	10	23rd
2007	Euroseries 3000	G-Tec	2	0	0	0	1	6	18th
2008	Spanish Formula Three Championship	Meycom	15	0	0	0	2	35	14th
2009	European F3 Open	Drivex	16	5	3	2	11	143	2nd
2010	Superleague Formula	Olympique Lyonnais	4	0	0	0	0	372	11th
2010	Auto GP	RP Motorsport	8	0	0	0	1	6	14th
2011	Spanish GT Championship	Aurora Energy Drink	8	2	1	3	7	122	1st
2011	International GT Open	Aurora Energy Drink	2	0	0	0	0	0	NC
2012	Spanish GT Championship	Ray Racing Team	2	0	0	1	1	13	22nd

=== Complete Formula Renault 3.5 Series results ===
(key)

Year	Entrant	1	2	3	4	5	6	7	8	9	10	11	12	13	14	15	16	17	DC	Points
2005	Pons Racing	ZOL; 1; 12	ZOL; 2; 16†	MON; 1; 11	VAL; 1; 18	VAL; 2 Ret	LMS; 1; 16	LMS; 2; 12	BIL; 1; 7	BIL; 2 Ret	OSC; 1 Ret	OSC; 2; 5	DON; 1; 10	DON; 2; 11	EST; 1; 18	EST; 2; 15	MOZ; 1; 7	MOZ; 2 Ret	19th	15
2006	Pons Racing	ZOL; 1 Ret	ZOL; 2 Ret	MON; 1 Ret	IST; 1; 10	IST; 2 Ret	MIS; 1; 13	MIS; 2; 11	SPA; 1; 13	SPA; 2; 16	NÜR; 1; 13	NÜR; 2; 15							24th	11
2006	Comtec Racing												DON; 1 Ret	DON; 2; 18	LMS; 1; 6	LMS; 2; 6	CAT; 1 Ret	CAT; 2 Ret	24th	11
2007	Eurointernational	MNZ; 1; 7	MNZ; 2; 5	NÜR; 1; 25	NÜR; 2 Ret	MON; 1; 20†	HUN; 1	HUN; 2	SPA; 1	SPA; 2	DON; 1	DON; 2	MAG; 1	MAG; 2	EST; 1	EST; 2	CAT; 1	CAT; 2	23rd	10

^{†} Driver did not finish the race, but was classified as he completed more than 90% of the race distance.
