= 2004 World Series Lights =

2004 World Series Lights season

Seasons
- ← 2003 none →

The 2004 World Series Lights season was contested over eight race weekends with 16 races. In this one-make formula all drivers had to use the Dallara chassis (Dallara WSL3) and Nissan engines (Nissan AER). Five different teams and eleven drivers competed with the titles going to Serbian driver Miloš Pavlović and Italian team Vergani Racing.

== Teams and drivers ==
All teams used the Dallara WSL3 chassis and Nissan AER engines.

Team	No.	Driver	Rounds
(Spain) Meycom	1	(Spain) Celso Míguez	All
(Spain) Meycom	2	(Spain) Christian Cano	1
(France) Epsilon by Graff	3	(France) Simon Abadie	All
(France) Epsilon by Graff	4	(France) Bastien Brière	1–5
(France) Epsilon by Graff	4	(Spain) Juan Antonio del Pino	7
(Italy) RC Motorsport	5	(Spain) Juan Antonio del Pino	1
(Italy) RC Motorsport	6	(Italy) Marco Cencetti	1
(Italy) Vergani Racing	8	(Italy) Matteo Pellegrino	All
(Italy) Vergani Racing	9	(Italy) Giovanni Tedeschi	1–4
(Italy) Vergani Racing	10	(Serbia and Montenegro) Miloš Pavlović	1–7
(France) Saulnier Racing	11	(Switzerland) Harold Primat	All
(France) Saulnier Racing	12	(France) Matthieu Lahaye	All

== Race calendar and results ==
Round		Location	Circuit	Date	Pole position	Fastest lap	Winning driver	Winning team
1	R1	Madrid, Spain	Circuito del Jarama	28 March	(France) Matthieu Lahaye	(Serbia and Montenegro) Miloš Pavlović	(Serbia and Montenegro) Miloš Pavlović	(Italy) Vergani Racing
1	R2	Madrid, Spain	Circuito del Jarama	28 March	(Serbia and Montenegro) Miloš Pavlović	(Spain) Juan Antonio del Pino	(Serbia and Montenegro) Miloš Pavlović	(Italy) Vergani Racing
2	R1	Heusden-Zolder, Belgium	Zolder	25 April	(Serbia and Montenegro) Miloš Pavlović	(Serbia and Montenegro) Miloš Pavlović	(Spain) Celso Míguez	(Spain) Meycom
2	R2	Heusden-Zolder, Belgium	Zolder	25 April	(France) Simon Abadie	(Serbia and Montenegro) Miloš Pavlović	(France) Simon Abadie	(France) Epsilon by Graff
3	R1	Magny-Cours, France	Circuit de Nevers Magny-Cours	23 May	(Serbia and Montenegro) Miloš Pavlović	(France) Simon Abadie	(Serbia and Montenegro) Miloš Pavlović	(Italy) Vergani Racing
3	R2	Magny-Cours, France	Circuit de Nevers Magny-Cours	23 May	(France) Bastien Brière	(France) Simon Abadie	(Serbia and Montenegro) Miloš Pavlović	(Italy) Vergani Racing
4	R1	Valencia, Spain	Circuit de Valencia	20 June	(France) Simon Abadie	(Serbia and Montenegro) Miloš Pavlović	(France) Simon Abadie	(France) Epsilon by Graff
4	R2	Valencia, Spain	Circuit de Valencia	20 June	(Serbia and Montenegro) Miloš Pavlović	(France) Bastien Brière	(France) Matthieu Lahaye	(France) Saulnier Racing
5	R1	Brandenburg, Germany	EuroSpeedway Lausitz	8 August	(Spain) Celso Míguez	(Spain) Celso Míguez	(Spain) Celso Míguez	(Spain) Meycom
5	R2	Brandenburg, Germany	EuroSpeedway Lausitz	8 August	(Spain) Celso Míguez	(Serbia and Montenegro) Miloš Pavlović	(Italy) Matteo Pellegrino	(Italy) Vergani Racing
6	R1	Estoril, Portugal	Autódromo do Estoril	19 September	(Serbia and Montenegro) Miloš Pavlović	(France) Simon Abadie	(Serbia and Montenegro) Miloš Pavlović	(Italy) Vergani Racing
6	R2	Estoril, Portugal	Autódromo do Estoril	19 September	(Serbia and Montenegro) Miloš Pavlović	(Serbia and Montenegro) Miloš Pavlović	(Italy) Matteo Pellegrino	(Italy) Vergani Racing
7	R1	Montmeló, Spain	Circuit de Catalunya	3 October	(Serbia and Montenegro) Miloš Pavlović	(Spain) Celso Míguez	(Serbia and Montenegro) Miloš Pavlović	(Italy) Vergani Racing
7	R2	Montmeló, Spain	Circuit de Catalunya	3 October	(Serbia and Montenegro) Miloš Pavlović	(Serbia and Montenegro) Miloš Pavlović	(Serbia and Montenegro) Miloš Pavlović	(Italy) Vergani Racing
8	R1	Valencia, Spain	Circuit de Valencia	17 October	(Spain) Celso Míguez	(Spain) Celso Míguez	(Spain) Celso Míguez	(Spain) Meycom
8	R2	Valencia, Spain	Circuit de Valencia	17 October	(France) Simon Abadie	(France) Simon Abadie	(France) Simon Abadie	(France) Epsilon by Graff

== Championship standings ==
=== Final points standings ===
For every race the points were awarded: 15 points to the winner, 12 for runner-up, 10 for third place, 8 for fourth place, 6 for fifth place, winding down to 1 point for 10th place. Lower placed drivers did not award points. Additional points were awarded to the driver setting the fastest race lap (2 points). The best 12 race results count, but all additional points count. Four drivers had a point deduction, which are given in tooltips.

- Points System:

Pos	1	2	3	4	5	6	7	8	9	10	FL
Pts	20	15	12	10	8	6	4	3	2	1	2

Pos	Driver	JAR (Spain)		ZOL (Belgium)		MAG (France)		VAL (Spain)		LAU (Germany)		EST (Portugal)		CAT (Spain)		VAL (Spain)		Points
1	(Serbia and Montenegro) Miloš Pavlović	1	1	3	4	1	1	Ret	2	2	2	1	Ret	1	1			161
2	(Spain) Celso Míguez	4	3	1	5	5	Ret	3	DNS	1	2	3	2	2	Ret	1	4	139
3	(France) Simon Abadie	6	6	Ret	1	2	2	1	Ret	4	Ret	2	DSQ	4	3	Ret	1	125
4	(Italy) Matteo Pellegrino	3	9	5	2	7	5	2	4	5	1	Ret	1	3	Ret	Ret	3	114
5	(France) Matthieu Lahaye	7	4	DNS	DNS	4	3	4	1	7	Ret	Ret	Ret	5	Ret	2	2	87
6	(Switzerland) Harold Primat	9	5	Ret	6	6	6	6	5	6	3	4	3	Ret	4	3	Ret	83
7	(France) Bastien Brière	8	8	2	3	3	Ret	5	3	3	4							74
8	(Spain) Juan Antonio del Pino	2	2											Ret	2			38
9	(Italy) Giovanni Tedeschi	10	Ret	4	Ret	8	4	7	6									29
10	(Italy) Marco Cencetti	5	7															10
11	(Spain) Christian Cano	11	Ret															0

Only in race 1 all points were awarded — in all other races not all points were awarded (not enough competitors).
