= Julien Vidot =

French racing driver (born 1982)

- Nationality: (France) French
- Born: 4 December 1982 (age 43) Perigord, France

Julien Vidot (born 4 December 1982, in Perigord) is a French racing driver. He has competed in such series as Euro Formula 3000, World Series by Nissan/Lights and the Formula Chrysler Euroseries.

In 2001, Vidot competed in the Formula Chrysler Euroseries, coming second in the final two-race round behind R. van der Ende.
