= Miloš Pavlović (racing driver) =

Serbian racing driver

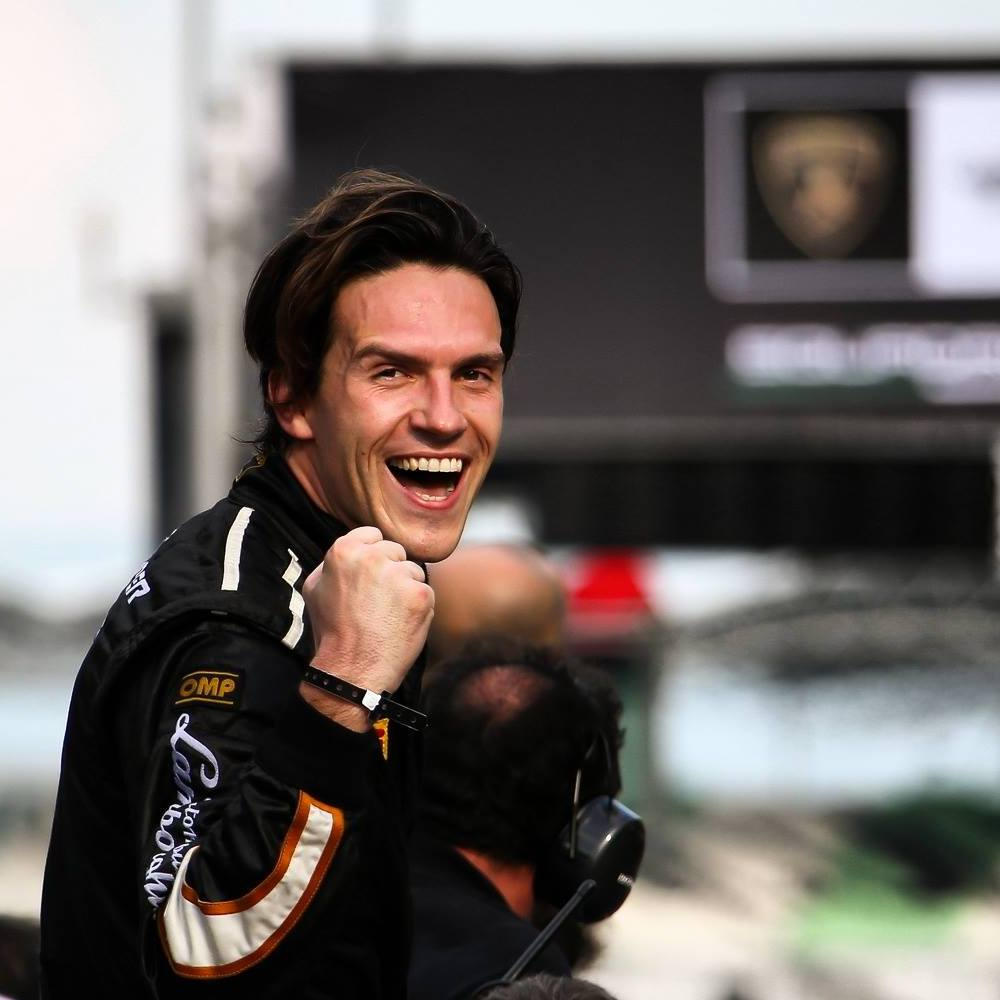
- Pavlović in 2014
- Nationality: Serbian
- Born: 8 October 1982 (age 44) Belgrade, Yugoslavia

Lamborghini Super Trofeo Europe career
- Debut season: 2014
- Current team: Auto Sport Racing
- Categorisation: FIA Gold (until 2026); FIA Silver (2027–)
- Car number: 33
- Starts: 14
- Wins: 5
- Poles: 1
- Fastest laps: 4
- Best finish: 1 in 2014

Championship titles
- 2014 2014 2004 2002: Lamborghini Super Trofeo World; Lamborghini Super Trofeo Europe; World Series Lights; Italian Formula 3 Championship

Miloš Pavlović (Serbian Cyrillic: Милош Павловић; born 8 October 1982) is a Serbian professional racing driver.

== Biography ==
=== Karting ===
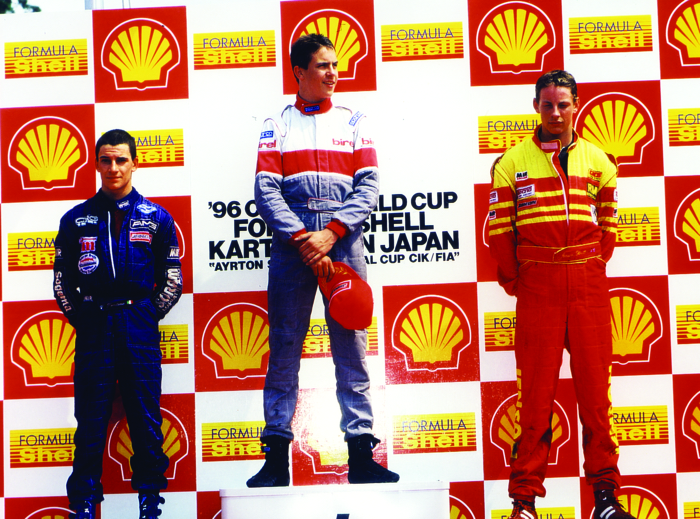
Pavlovic, Giorgio Pantano and Jenson Button on the podium in Suzuka, Japan.

Pavlović was born in Belgrade. His career began in 1991 in go-karts, winning two national titles the following year. He went in 1993 to Italy, where in his first season, he became regional champion of Italy and reached second place in the Winter Cup. He became vice-champion of Europe in Portugal (Braga), and he came third in the World Championship in Italy (Ugento), and was named Yugoslav Driver of the Year.

In 1996, Pavlović became the youngest-ever winner of the Karting World Cup, winning the "Ayrton Senna Trophy”, and was awarded in 2003 a prize for his contribution to the development of the sport by the governing body of karting, the CIK.

=== Formula Vauxhall ===
During 1997, Pavlović tested in various formulas and completed the Jim Russell Racing Drivers School in Formula Vauxhall in England, winning at Donington Park.

In 1998, Pavlović competed in the Formula Vauxhall Junior Championship. However, lack of finance meant that he took part in 12 out of the 16 races in the season, and finished in tenth. Staying in the championship for 1999, he achieved two pole positions, two wins and three podium finishes. His gearbox failed at Thruxton, leaving him fourth in the standings at seasons' end.

=== Formula Three ===
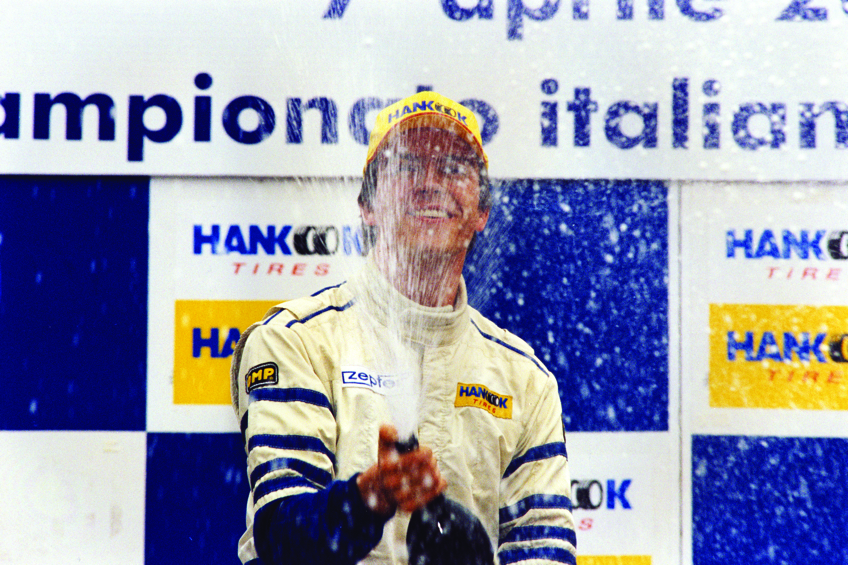
Pavlović celebrating on the podium after winning the Italian F3 title in Mugello

Pavlović moved up to British Formula Three in 2000, debuting with new team RC Motorsport. He finished 11th in the standings with two top-five finishes, and moved back to Italy having struggled to find funding for 2002. Despite this, he found a drive at Target Racing in Italian Formula Three, and won five races on his way to the title, and becoming the first driver from any of the former Yugoslav states to gain an FIA Super License.

=== World Series by Nissan/Renault ===
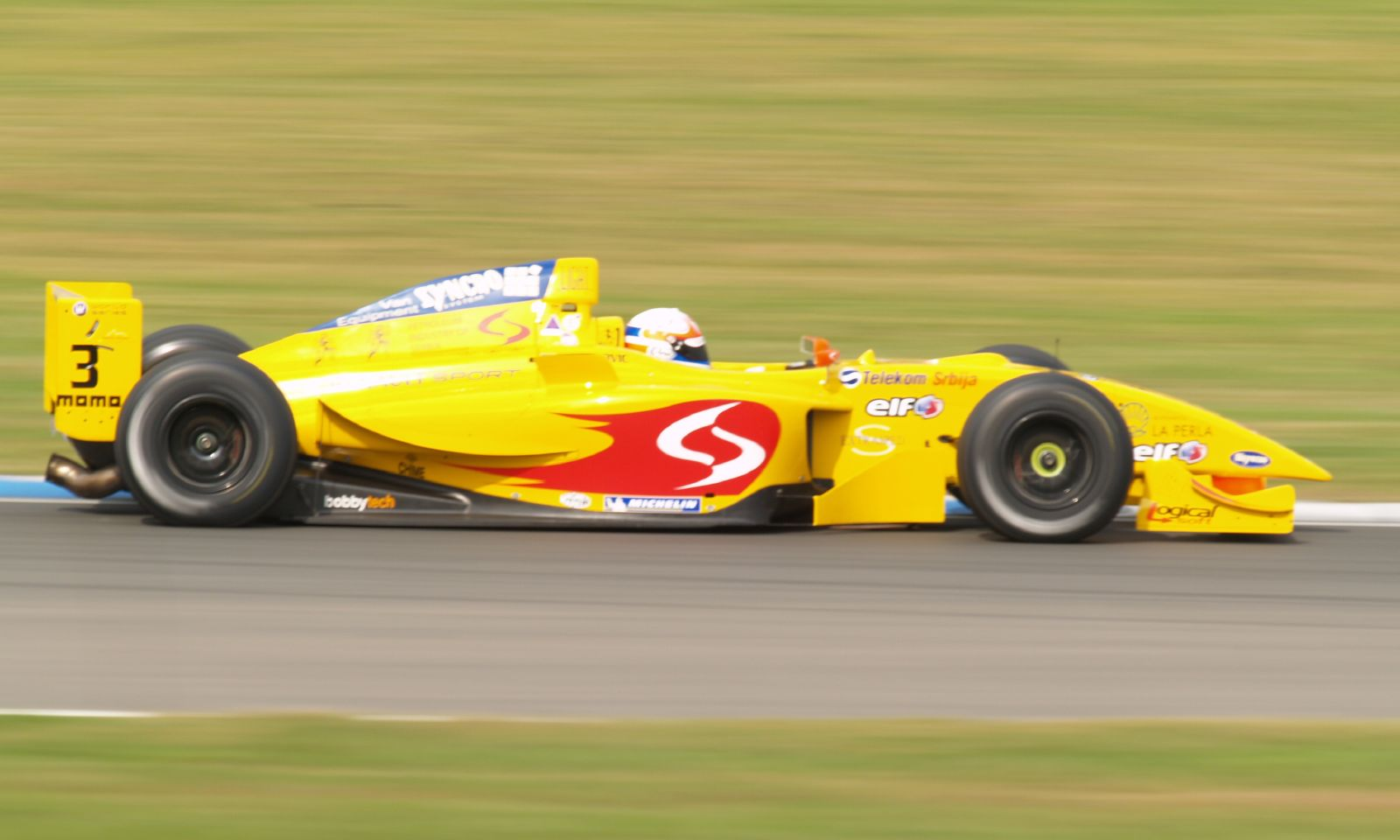
Pavlović driving for Draco Racing in the Donington Park round of the 2007 World Series by Renault season

Pavlović competed in the World Series Lights championship in 2003, driving for Epsilon by Graff, finishing third. He won the title at his second attempt with Italian team Vergani Racing having won seven out of sixteen races, and moved on to the main series. Finishing 17th and 11th in his first two seasons, he managed two wins with Draco Racing to finish third in the championship.

=== GP2 Series ===
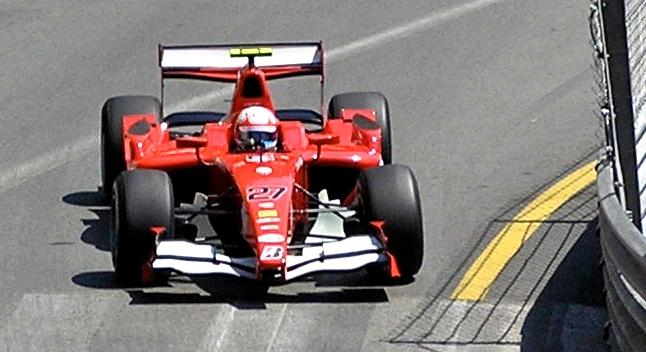
Pavlović driving for BCN Competicion at the Monaco round of the 2008 GP2 Series season

Pavlović competed in GP2 for 2008 with BCN Competicion, but was dropped after three rounds in favour of Brazilian Carlos Iaconelli.

=== FIA Formula Two Championship ===
For 2009, Pavlović moved into the reborn FIA Formula Two Championship. Pavlović finished in ninth place overall despite retiring from a third of the races.

=== FIA GT1 World Championship ===
Pavlović debuted in the FIA GT1 World Championship in 2011, driving for Belgian Racing alongside Czech Martin Matzke. The team scored two 12th places in Abu Dhabi and 11th place at Zolder before he was replaced with Frenchman Antoine Leclerc. He returned with Sunred Engineering in 2012, with a best result of ninth in Portugal.

=== Lamborghini Super Trofeo ===
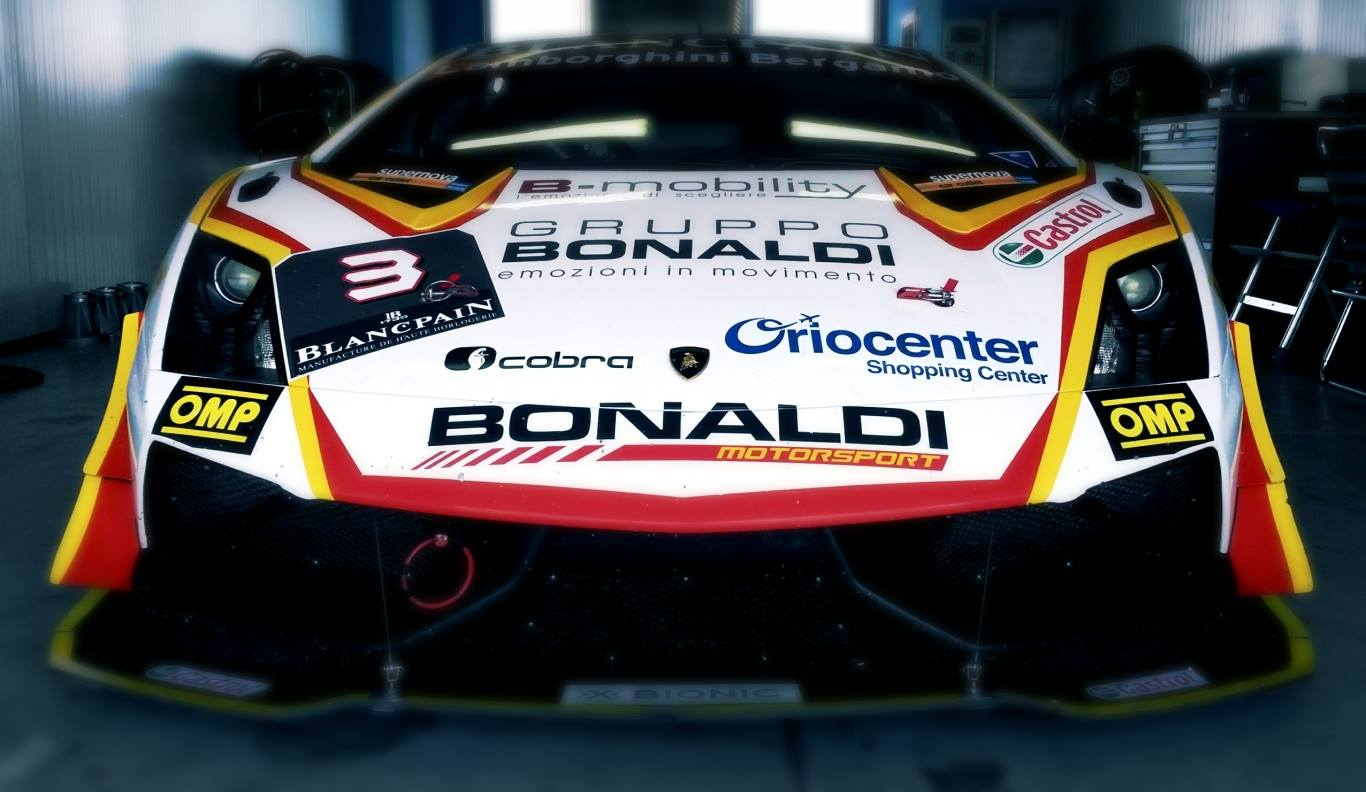
Pavlović's Lamborghini Gallardo Super Trofeo at the test session in Franciacorta, Italy.

In 2014, Pavlović joined the Italian racing team Bonaldi Motorsport in the Lamborghini Super Trofeo series. Sharing a drive with Edoardo Piscopo, Pavlović won both the Pro Division of the European and World Championships, becoming the first duo to win the title. He competed in the Pro-Am class of the European Division in 2015, winning at Circuit Paul Ricard.

Since 2014, Pavlović has been racing and coaching different gentlemen drivers. He focused on helping them develop their skills on and off the racing track - Pro-AM category. In the process, he achieved various pole positions and wins. In 2024, he finished together with Alessio Ruffini third in the World Finals.

=== ADAC GT Masters ===
In 2016, Pavlović joined the Bonaldi team's ADAC GT Masters assault. Driving with Patrick Kujala, the entry scored a total of seven points with three points-paying finishes.

=== Italian GT Endurance Championship ===
In 2022, Pavlović has won the GT Cup category alongside the German Michael Fischbaum.

In 2024, Pavlović raced in the AM class alongside Thai Pek and German Spengler. They finished fourth in the standings and achieved along the way one win and one second place.

In 2025, Pavlović raced once again in the AM class alongside Thai Mai and German Spengler. This time, they finished second in the overall standings falling short of a title by only three points. Along the way, they achieved one race win, one second and one third place.

=== GT Open ===
In 2023, Pavlović paired the Thai driver Pek and together they finished sixth in the standings achieving one race win and four podium finished.

== Results ==
=== Complete Formula Renault 3.5 Series results ===
(key) (Races in bold indicate pole position) (Races in italics indicate fastest lap)

Year	Entrant	1	2	3	4	5	6	7	8	9	10	11	12	13	14	15	16	17	DC	Points
2005	GD Racing	ZOL; 1; 17	ZOL; 2 Ret	MON; 1 Ret	VAL; 1; 15	VAL; 2 Ret	LMS; 1; 9	LMS; 2 Ret	BIL; 1; 21	BIL; 2; 3	OSC; 1; 10	OSC; 2; 12	DON; 1; 17	DON; 2; 12	EST; 1; 11	EST; 2; 6	MNZ; 1 Ret	MNZ; 2; 10	17th	19
2006	Cram Competition	ZOL; 1; 20	ZOL; 2; 6	MON; 1; 9	IST; 1; 13	IST; 2; 21	MIS; 1; 17	MIS; 2; 14											11th	41
2006	EuroInternational								SPA; 1; 15	SPA; 2; 23	NÜR; 1; 4	NÜR; 2 Ret							11th	41
2006	Draco Racing												DON; 1; 3	DON; 2; 8	LMS; 1; 2	LMS; 2 Ret	CAT; 1 Ret	CAT; 2; 18†	11th	41
2007	Draco Racing	MNZ; 1; 6	MNZ; 2; 2	NÜR; 1; 15	NÜR; 2; 24	MON; 1; 4	HUN; 1; 7	HUN; 2; 2	SPA; 1; 7	SPA; 2; 1	DON; 1; 11	DON; 2 Ret	MAG; 1; 4	MAG; 2 Ret	EST; 1; 9	EST; 2; 1	CAT; 1; 4	CAT; 2; 4	**3rd**	**96**

=== Complete GP2 Series results ===
(key) (Races in bold indicate pole position) (Races in italics indicate fastest lap)

Year	Entrant	1	2	3	4	5	6	7	8	9	10	11	12	13	14	15	16	17	18	19	20	DC	Points
2008	BCN Competición	CAT; FEA; DNS	CAT; SPR; 12	IST; FEA; Ret	IST; SPR; 16	MON; FEA; DNS	MON; SPR; DNS	MAG; FEA	MAG; SPR	SIL; FEA	SIL; SPR	HOC; FEA	HOC; SPR	HUN; FEA	HUN; SPR	VAL; FEA	VAL; SPR	SPA; FEA	SPA; SPR	MNZ; FEA	MNZ; SPR	32nd	0

==== Complete GP2 Asia Series results ====
(key) (Races in bold indicate pole position) (Races in italics indicate fastest lap)

Year	Entrant	1	2	3	4	5	6	7	8	9	10	DC	Points
2008	BCN Competición	DUB; FEA; 10	DUB; SPR; 14	SEN; FEA; 6	SEN; SPR; Ret	SEP; FEA; 7	SEP; SPR; 12	BHR; FEA; 19	BHR; SPR; 15	DUB; FEA; 8	DUB; SPR; Ret	16th	6

=== Complete FIA Formula Two Championship results ===
(key) (Races in bold indicate pole position) (Races in italics indicate fastest lap)

Year	1	2	3	4	5	6	7	8	9	10	11	12	13	14	15	16	DC	Points
2009	VAL; 1 Ret	VAL; 2; 17	BRN; 1 Ret	BRN; 2; 5	SPA; 1; 2	SPA; 2; 4	BRH; 1; 7	BRH; 2 Ret	DON; 1 Ret	DON; 2; 8	OSC; 1 Ret	OSC; 2; 21	IMO; 1; 6	IMO; 2; 3	CAT; 1; 10	CAT; 2; 19	9th	29

=== Complete GT1 World Championship results ===
Year	Team	Car	1	2	3	4	5	6	7	8	9	10	11	12	13	14	15	16	17	18	19	20	Pos	Points
2011	Belgian Racing	Matech Ford GT1	ABU; QR; 12	ABU; CR; 12	ZOL; QR; Ret	ZOL; CR; 11	ALG; QR	ALG; CR	SAC; QR	SAC; CR	SIL; QR	SIL; CR	NAV; QR	NAV; CR	PRI; QR	PRI; CR	ORD; QR	ORD; CR	BEI; QR	BEI; CR	SAN; QR	SAN; CR	38th	0
2012	Sunred	Ford GT GT3	NOG; QR; 15	NOG; CR; 14	ZOL; QR; DNS	ZOL; CR; 16	NAV; QR; Ret	NAV; QR; Ret	SVK; QR; 7	SVK; CR; 12	ALG; QR; 7	ALG; CR; 9	SVK; QR; DNS	SVK; CR; Ret	MOS; QR	MOS; CR	NUR; QR	NUR; CR	DON; QR	DON; CR			22nd	2

* Season still in progress.

=== Complete IMSA SportsCar Championship results ===
(key) (Races in bold indicate pole position) (Races in italics indicate fastest lap)

Year	Team	Class	Car	Engine	1	2	3	4	5	6	7	8	9	10	11	12	Pos.	Points
2017	GRT Grasser Racing Team	GTD	Lamborghini Huracán GT3	Lamborghini 5.2 L V10	DAY; 17	SEB	LBH	COA	DET	WGL	MOS	LIM	ELK	VIR	LGA	PET	76th	14
2019	Precision Performance Motorsports	GTD	Lamborghini Huracán GT3 Evo	Lamborghini 5.2 L V10	DAY; 18	SEB	MOH	DET	WGL	MOS	LIM	ELK	VIR	LGA	PET		65th	13

Sporting positions
Preceded by Lorenzo del Gallo	Italian Formula Three Champion; 2002	Succeeded by Fausto Ippoliti
Preceded by Juan Cruz Álvarez	World Series by Nissan; World Series Lights Champion; 2004	Succeeded by None
Preceded by Andrea Amici	Super Trofeo European Champion; 2014	Succeeded by Patrick Kujala
