= 2001 Open Telefónica by Nissan =

Seasons
- ← 2000 2002 →

The 2001 Open Telefónica by Nissan was contested over 8 race weekends/16 rounds. In this one-make formula all drivers had to use Coloni chassis (Coloni CN1) and Nissan engines (Nissan 2L). 12 different teams and 33 different drivers competed.

== Teams and Drivers ==
Team	No.	Driver	Rounds
(Spain) Campos Motorsport	1	(Spain) Rafael Sarandeses	All
(Spain) Campos Motorsport	2	(Italy) Matteo Bobbi	All
(Spain) Campos Motorsport	3	(Spain) Borja García	All
(Italy) Vergani Racing	4	(South Africa) Tomas Scheckter	All
(Italy) Vergani Racing	5	(Spain) Santiago Porteiro	All
(Italy) Vergani Racing	6	(Venezuela) Milka Duno	All
(Italy) Venturini Racing	7	(France) Jonathan Cochet	2-4
(Italy) Venturini Racing	7	(Italy) Maurizio Mediani	5
(Italy) Venturini Racing	7	(Spain) Abel Fajas	7-8
(Italy) PSN GD Racing	9	(Argentina) Leandro Iglesias	All
(Italy) PSN GD Racing	10	(Argentina) Mariano Acebal	1
(Italy) PSN GD Racing	10	(Argentina) Brian Smith	2-3
(Italy) PSN GD Racing	10	(Argentina) Nicolás Filiberti	4-7
(Italy) PSN GD Racing	10	(United Kingdom) Andy Priaulx	8
(France) Epsilon by Graff	11	(France) Franck Montagny	All
(France) Epsilon by Graff	12	(France) Grégoire de Galzain	1-4, 6
(France) Epsilon by Graff	12	(France) Jean-Christophe Ravier	7-8
(France) Epsilon by Graff	26	(France) Geoffrey Dellus	All
(Italy) Sitec Motorsport	14	(Italy) Andrea Belicchi	All
(Italy) Sitec Motorsport	15	(Italy) Filippo Zadotti	1-4
(Italy) Sitec Motorsport	15	(Italy) Angelo Ferrazano	5-6
(France) G-Tec	16	(Spain) Jordi Nogués	1-4, 6
(France) G-Tec	17	(Spain) Carlos Martín	3-4
(France) G-Tec	27	(France) Philippe Benoliel	1-3
(Italy) Scuderia Famà	18	(Portugal) Manuel Gião	1-7
(Italy) Scuderia Famà	19	(Portugal) Paulo Alho	1-7
(Spain) Repsol YPF-Meycom	20	(Spain) Victor Ordóñez	All
(Spain) Repsol YPF-Meycom	21	(Portugal) Ricardo Megre	1-3
(Spain) Repsol YPF-Meycom	21	(Spain) Fernando Navarrete	7-8
(Spain) Repsol YPF-Meycom	22	(Spain) Ángel Burgueño	All
(Spain) Skualo Competición	23	(Spain) Sergi Iborra	1, 3-5, 7
(Spain) Skualo Competición	24	(Spain) Abel Fajas	3-6
(Spain) Skualo Competición	24	(Spain) Antonio Oriol	7-8
(France) G-Tec Formax	28	(France) Benoit Garnier	1-2

== Race calendar ==
Round		Circuit	Date	Pole position	Fastest lap	Winning driver	Winning team	Report
1	R1	Circuito del Jarama, San Sebastián de los Reyes, Spain	March 31	(Spain) Rafael Sarandeses	(France) Franck Montagny	(France) Franck Montagny	(France) Epsilon by Graff	Report
1	R2	Circuito del Jarama, San Sebastián de los Reyes, Spain	April 1	(France) Franck Montagny	(Spain) Rafael Sarandeses	(France) Franck Montagny	(France) Epsilon by Graff	Report
2	R1	Autódromo do Estoril, Estoril, Portugal	April 21	(South Africa) Tomas Scheckter	(France) Franck Montagny	(South Africa) Tomas Scheckter	(Italy) Vergani Racing	Report
2	R2	Autódromo do Estoril, Estoril, Portugal	April 22	(South Africa) Tomas Scheckter	(France) Jonathan Cochet	(South Africa) Tomas Scheckter	(Italy) Vergani Racing	Report
3	R1	Circuito de Albacete, Albacete, Spain	May 12	(France) Franck Montagny	(France) Franck Montagny	(Italy) Andrea Belicchi	(Italy) Sitec Motorsport	Report
3	R2	Circuito de Albacete, Albacete, Spain	May 13	(South Africa) Tomas Scheckter	(France) Franck Montagny	(France) Franck Montagny	(France) Epsilon by Graff	Report
4	R1	Circuito Ricardo Tormo, Valencia, Spain	June 9	(South Africa) Tomas Scheckter	(Spain) Ángel Burgueño	(South Africa) Tomas Scheckter	(Italy) Vergani Racing	Report
4	R2	Circuito Ricardo Tormo, Valencia, Spain	June 10	(France) Franck Montagny	(France) Franck Montagny	(France) Franck Montagny	(France) Epsilon by Graff	Report
5	R1	Autodromo Nazionale Monza, Monza, Italy	July 14	(France) Franck Montagny	(Spain) Rafael Sarandeses	(Italy) Andrea Belicchi	(Italy) Sitec Motorsport	Report
5	R2	Autodromo Nazionale Monza, Monza, Italy	July 15	(France) Franck Montagny	(France) Franck Montagny	(France) Franck Montagny	(France) Epsilon by Graff	Report
6	R1	Circuit de Nevers Magny-Cours, Nevers, France	August 31	(France) Franck Montagny	(France) Franck Montagny	(France) Franck Montagny	(France) Epsilon by Graff	Report
6	R2	Circuit de Nevers Magny-Cours, Nevers, France	September 1	(France) Franck Montagny	(France) Franck Montagny	(France) Franck Montagny	(France) Epsilon by Graff	Report
7	R1	Circuit de Catalunya, Barcelona, Spain	September 29	(South Africa) Tomas Scheckter	(South Africa) Tomas Scheckter	(South Africa) Tomas Scheckter	(Italy) Vergani Racing	Report
7	R2	Circuit de Catalunya, Barcelona, Spain	September 30	(South Africa) Tomas Scheckter	(South Africa) Tomas Scheckter	(France) Franck Montagny	(France) Epsilon by Graff	Report
8	R1	Circuito Ricardo Tormo, Valencia, Spain	October 27	(South Africa) Tomas Scheckter	(France) Franck Montagny	(Spain) Ángel Burgueño	(Spain) Repsol YPF-Meycom	Report
8	R2	Circuito Ricardo Tormo, Valencia, Spain	October 28	(South Africa) Tomas Scheckter	(South Africa) Tomas Scheckter	(Italy) Matteo Bobbi	(Spain) Campos Motorsport	Report

== Final points standings ==
For every race the points were awarded: 20 points to the winner, 15 for runner-up, 12 for third place, 10 for fourth place, 8 for fifth place, 6 for sixth place, 4 for seventh place, winding down to 1 point for 10th place. Lower placed drivers did not award points. Additional points were awarded to the driver setting the fastest race lap (2 points). The best 11 race results count, but all additional points count. Five drivers had a point deduction, which are given in ().

=== Drivers ===
- Points System:

Pos	1	2	3	4	5	6	7	8	9	10	FL
Pts	20	15	12	10	8	6	4	3	2	1	2

Pos	Driver	JAR (Spain)		EST (Portugal)		ALB (Spain)		VAL (Spain)		MNZ (Italy)		MAG (France)		CAT (Spain)		VAL (Spain)		Pts
1	(France) Franck Montagny	1	1	5	4	9	1	Ret	1	Ret	1	1	1	5	1	2	Ret	211
2	(South Africa) Tomas Scheckter	10	3	1	1	2	2	1	2	3	2	5	2	1	Ret	Ret	9	185
3	(Italy) Andrea Belicchi	5	6	4	2	1	4	2	4	1	4	6	4	7	15	Ret	4	138
4	(Spain) Rafael Sarandeses	2	2	7	5	8	11	3	9	2	3	3	5	3	9	Ret	2	132
5	(Spain) Ángel Burgueño	4	8	6	6	Ret	Ret	4	3	4	6	2	Ret	2	3	1	Ret	124
6	(Italy) Matteo Bobbi	7	4	Ret	Ret	6	Ret	Ret	5	6	7	8	Ret	Ret	Ret	6	1	67
7	(Portugal) Manuel Gião	3	5	2	12	Ret	7	Ret	Ret	5	5	4	10	EX	EX			66
8	(Spain) Santiago Porteiro	13	10	9	8	Ret	3	12	Ret	8	13	10	Ret	4	4	3	3	66
9	(France) Jonathan Cochet			3	3	5	5	5	10									51
10	(Spain) Borja García	12	15	Ret	7	Ret	DNS	8	7	Ret	9	11	3	6	Ret	4	6	47
11	(Spain) Víctor Ordóñez	6	9	14	Ret	3	13	14	12	12	11	7	6	Ret	6	11	8	39
12	(Argentina) Leandro Iglesias	Ret	13	Ret	13	Ret	Ret	13	6	9	8	9	9	9	8	7	7	28
13	(France) Jean-Christophe Ravier													10	2	Ret	5	24
14	(France) Geoffrey Dellus	11	12	13	14	Ret	Ret	6	Ret	10	12	Ret	Ret	Ret	5	8	11	18
15	(Portugal) Paulo Alho	16	7	8	16	Ret	6	11	13	7	DNS	Ret	Ret	11	10			18
16	(Argentina) Nicolás Filiberti							7	8	Ret	Ret	Ret	7	8	7			18
17	(Spain) Jordi Nogués	8	18	12	19	4	9	10	Ret			DNS	DNS					16
18	(United Kingdom) Andy Priaulx															5	Ret	8
19	(France) Grégoire De Galzain	Ret	21	Ret	11	7	12	Ret	DNS			12	8					7
20	(Italy) Filippo Zadotti	Ret	11	Ret	9	10	Ret	9	11									5
21	(Portugal) Ricardo Megre	9	17	10	Ret	12	10											4
22	(France) Philippe Benoliel	14	14	17	15	11	8											3
23	(Spain) Fernando Navarrete													12	11	9	Ret	2
24	(Argentina) Brian Smith			11	10	EX	EX											1
25	(Italy) Maurizio Mediani									11	10							1
26	(Spain) Abel Fajas					15	16	16	16	Ret	Ret	13	12	13	12	Ret	10	1
27	(Venezuela) Milka Duno	Ret	19	16	18	14	15	Ret	17	13	Ret	Ret	13	14	13	10	12	1
28	(Italy) Angelo Ferrazano									Ret	Ret	14	11					0
29	(Spain) Antonio Oriol													15	14	Ret	13	0
30	(Spain) Carlos Martín					13	Ret	17	14									0
31	(Spain) Sergi Yborra	Ret	16			Ret	14	15	15	14	14			16	DNS			0
32	(France) Benoit Garnier	15	20	15	17													0
33	(Argentina) Mariano Acebal	Ret	DNS															0
Pos	Driver	JAR (Spain)		EST (Portugal)		ALB (Spain)		VAL (Spain)		MZA (Italy)		MAG (France)		BAR (Spain)		VAL (Spain)		Pts

=== Teams ===
- Points System:

Pos	1	2	3	4	5	6	7	8	9	10	FL
Pts	20	15	12	10	8	6	4	3	2	1	2

Pos	Team	JAR (Spain)		EST (Portugal)		ALB (Spain)		VAL (Spain)		MZA (Italy)		MAG (France)		BAR (Spain)		VAL (Spain)		Pts
1	(France) Epsilon by Graff	1	1	5	4	7	1	6	1	10	1	1	1	5	1	2	5	238
2	(Italy) Vergani Racing	10	3	1	1	2	2	1	2	3	2	5	2	1	4	3	3	228
3	(Spain) Campos Motorsport	2	2	7	5	6	11	3	5	2	3	3	3	3	9	4	1	167
4	(Italy) Sitec Motorsport	5	6	4	2	1	4	2	4	1	4	6	4	7	15	Ret	4	154
5	(Spain) Repsol YPF-Meycom	4	8	6	6	Ret	Ret	4	3	4	6	2	6	2	3	1	8	149
6	(Italy) Scuderia Famà	3	5	2	12	Ret	6	11	13	5	5	4	10	11	10			69
7	(Italy) Venturini Racing			3	3	5	5	5	10	11	10			13	12	Ret	10	53
8	(Italy) PSN GD Racing	Ret	13	11	10	Ret	Ret	7	6	9	8	9	7	8	7	5	7	41
9	(France) G-Tec	8	14	12	15	4	8	10	14			DNS	DNS					17
10	(Spain) Skualo Competición	Ret	16			15	14	15	15	14	14			15	14	Ret	13	0
11	(France) G-Tec Formax	15	20	15	17													0
Pos	Team	JAR (Spain)		EST (Portugal)		ALB (Spain)		VAL (Spain)		MZA (Italy)		MAG (France)		BAR (Spain)		VAL (Spain)		Pts
