= Juan Cruz Álvarez =

Argentine car racer

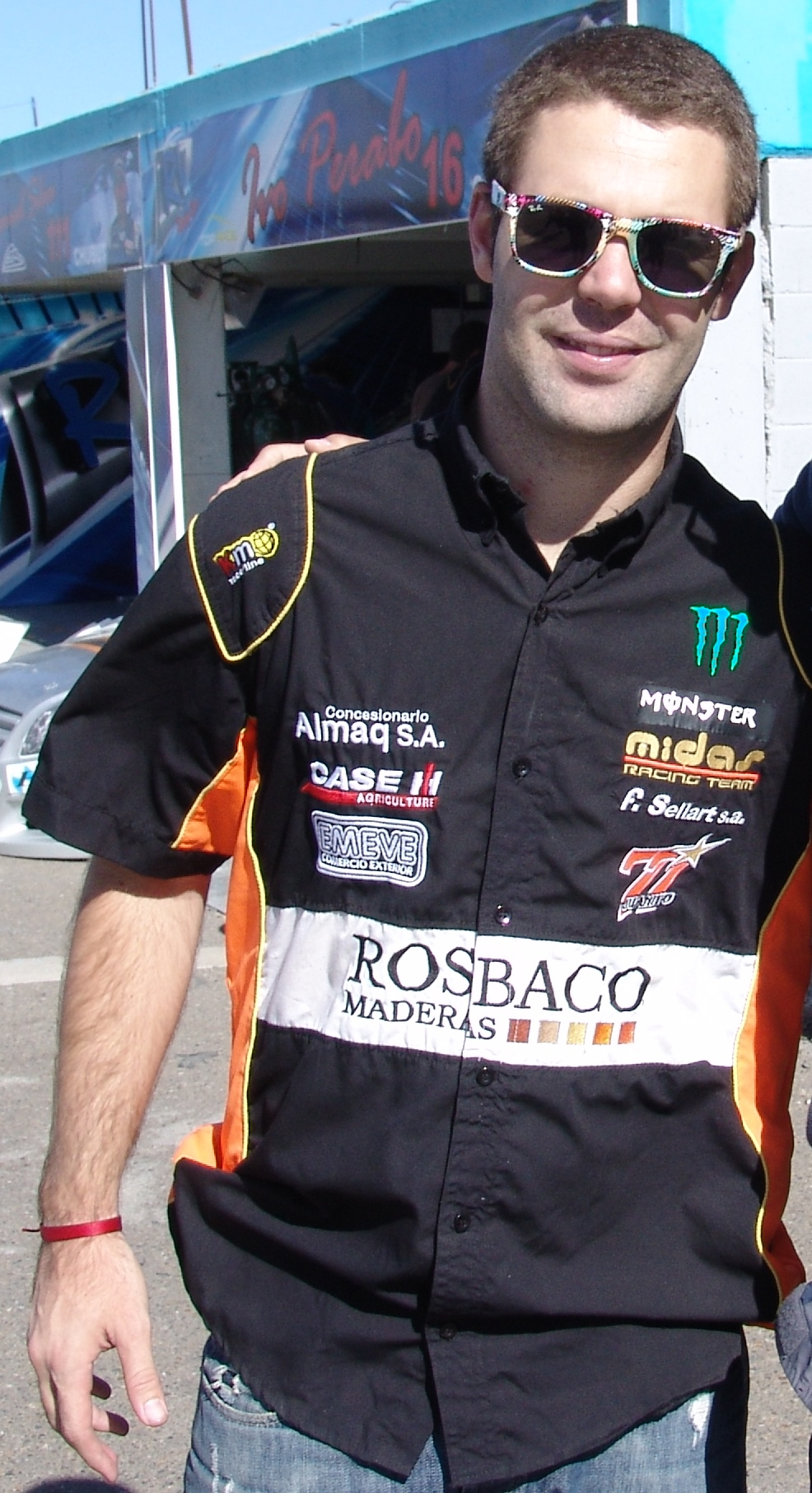
- Álvarez in 2012
- Nationality: Argentine
- Born: November 20, 1985 (age 40) Arrecifes, Argentina

Top Race V6 career
- Debut season: 2007
- Current team: Midas Racing Team
- Categorisation: FIA Silver
- Former teams: Catalan Magni Motorsports
- Starts: 15
- Wins: 1
- Poles: 0
- Best finish: 15th in 2007

Previous series
- 2007 2005 2004 2003: TC 2000; GP2 Series; World Series by Nissan; World Series Lights; Eurocup Formula Renault 2.0; Formula Renault 2.0 Italia

Championship titles
- 2003: World Series Lights

Juan Cruz Álvarez (born November 20, 1985, in Arrecifes, Argentina) is an Argentine former race car driver.

== Career ==
Álvarez was the World Series Lights champion in 2003, driving for the Meycom team. He moved up to the World Series by Nissan for 2004. In 2005, he drove in the inaugural GP2 Series season for Campos Racing, scoring 4.5 points overall.

Álvarez was not retained for 2006, and did not race during this year. For 2007, he moved back to Argentina, competing in the Top Race V6 championship. He continued in the series for 2008. He has also driven in TC2000 and International GT Open.

Álvarez left racing in 2019 to focus on his DJ career.

== Racing record ==
=== Complete World Series Lights results ===
(key) (Races in bold indicate pole position) (Races in italics indicate fastest lap)

Year	Entrant	1	2	3	4	5	6	7	8	9	10	11	12	13	14	15	16	DC	Points
2003	Meycom	MNZ; 1 Ret	MNZ; 2; 5	LAU; 1; 2	LAU; 2; 6	MAG; 1; 2	MAG; 2; 1	A1R; 1; 6	A1R; 2; 3	CAT; 1; 3	CAT; 2; 1	**VAL**; **1**; 1	**VAL**; **2**; 1	ALB; 1; 1	**ALB**; **2**; 1	JAR; 1; 1	JAR; 2; 1	1st	244

=== Complete World Series by Nissan results ===
(key) (Races in bold indicate pole position) (Races in italics indicate fastest lap)

Year	Entrant	1	2	3	4	5	6	7	8	9	10	11	12	13	14	15	16	17	18	DC	Points
2004	Gabord Reyco	JAR; 1; 3	JAR; 2; 2	ZOL; 1; 17	ZOL; 2; 6	MAG; 1; 6	MAG; 2; 7	VAL; 1; 12	VAL; 2 Ret	LAU; 1 Ret	LAU; 2; 7	EST; 1; 8	EST; 2; 4	CAT; 1; 7	CAT; 2; 5	VAL; 1 Ret	VAL; 2; 8	JER; 1; 10	JER; 2; 2	7th	77

=== Complete GP2 Series results ===
(key) (Races in bold indicate pole position) (Races in italics indicate fastest lap)

Year	Entrant	1	2	3	4	5	6	7	8	9	10	11	12	13	14	15	16	17	18	19	20	21	22	23	DC	Points
2005	Campos Racing	IMO; FEA; Ret	IMO; SPR; 7	CAT; FEA; Ret	CAT; SPR; 12	MON; FEA; Ret	NÜR; FEA; 18^{†}	NÜR; SPR; 15	MAG; FEA; Ret	MAG; SPR; DSQ	SIL; FEA; 11	SIL; SPR; Ret	HOC; FEA; 10	HOC; SPR; NC	HUN; FEA; Ret	HUN; SPR; 7	IST; FEA; 15	IST; SPR; Ret	MNZ; FEA; 12	MNZ; SPR; 17^{†}	SPA; FEA; 5	SPA; SPR; 6	BHR; FEA; 10	BHR; SPR; 12	18th	4.5
