= Vergani Racing =

(Italy) Vergani Racing
- Former series: World Series by Renault/Nissan/Lights
- Teams' Championships: 2001 Open Telefonica by Nissan season 2004 World Series Lights season
- Drivers' Championships: 2004 World Series Lights season (Pavlović)

Vergani Racing is an auto racing team based in Italy.
