= Jon Herb =

American racing driver and sex offender

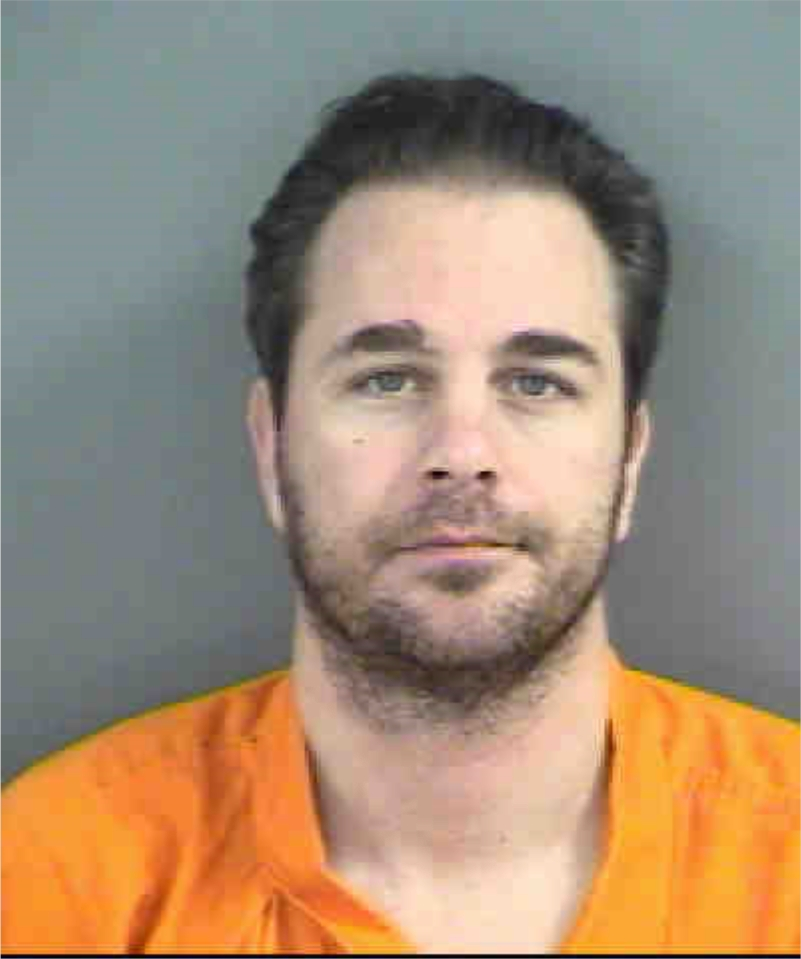
- Herb's booking photo following his arrest on child sexual abuse charges by the Collier County Sheriff's Department
- Born: Jon Allen Herb; June 1, 1970 (age 56) Milwaukee, Wisconsin, U.S.

IRL IndyCar Series
- Years active: 2000–2002, 2007
- Teams: Byrd-McCormack Racing; Tri-Star Racing; Racing Professionals
- Starts: 16
- Wins: 0
- Poles: 0
- Fastest laps: 0
- Best finish: 23rd in 2001 & 2007

Previous series
- 2004–2006 1998–2001: Indy Pro Series; ARCA Racing Series

Jon Allen Herb (born June 1, 1970) is an American convicted child sex offender and former racecar owner and driver in the Indy Racing League and ARCA.

== Racing career ==
=== IRL debut ===
Herb made his IRL debut in the opening round of the 2000 season. Herb raced in the Delphi Indy 200 at Walt Disney World Speedway. He qualified 26th, and finished 22nd, dropping out with handling problems. Herb spent most of the rest of the year driving in the ARCA series (best finished was eleventh, three times).

Herb made his Indianapolis 500 debut in 2001, finishing 27th. He competed in five other races, with a best finish of ninth at Texas. He made six more starts in 2002, but did not attempt to qualify at Indy.

=== Indy Pro Series ===
In 2004, Herb moved to the Infiniti Pro Series, where he co-owned his team with Matt Young. His first IPS start was the Freedom 100, where dropped out with a broken suspension and finished seventeenth. He finished in the top-ten at the next two events he entered, netting a sixth place finish at Fontana and a seventh in the season finale in Fort Worth.

Herd ran a full schedule in 2005, won the race at Phoenix, and finished seventh in the season points standings.

In 23 Indy Pro Series starts from 2004 to 2006, Herb had one win, and a total of fifteen top-ten finishes.

=== IRL return ===
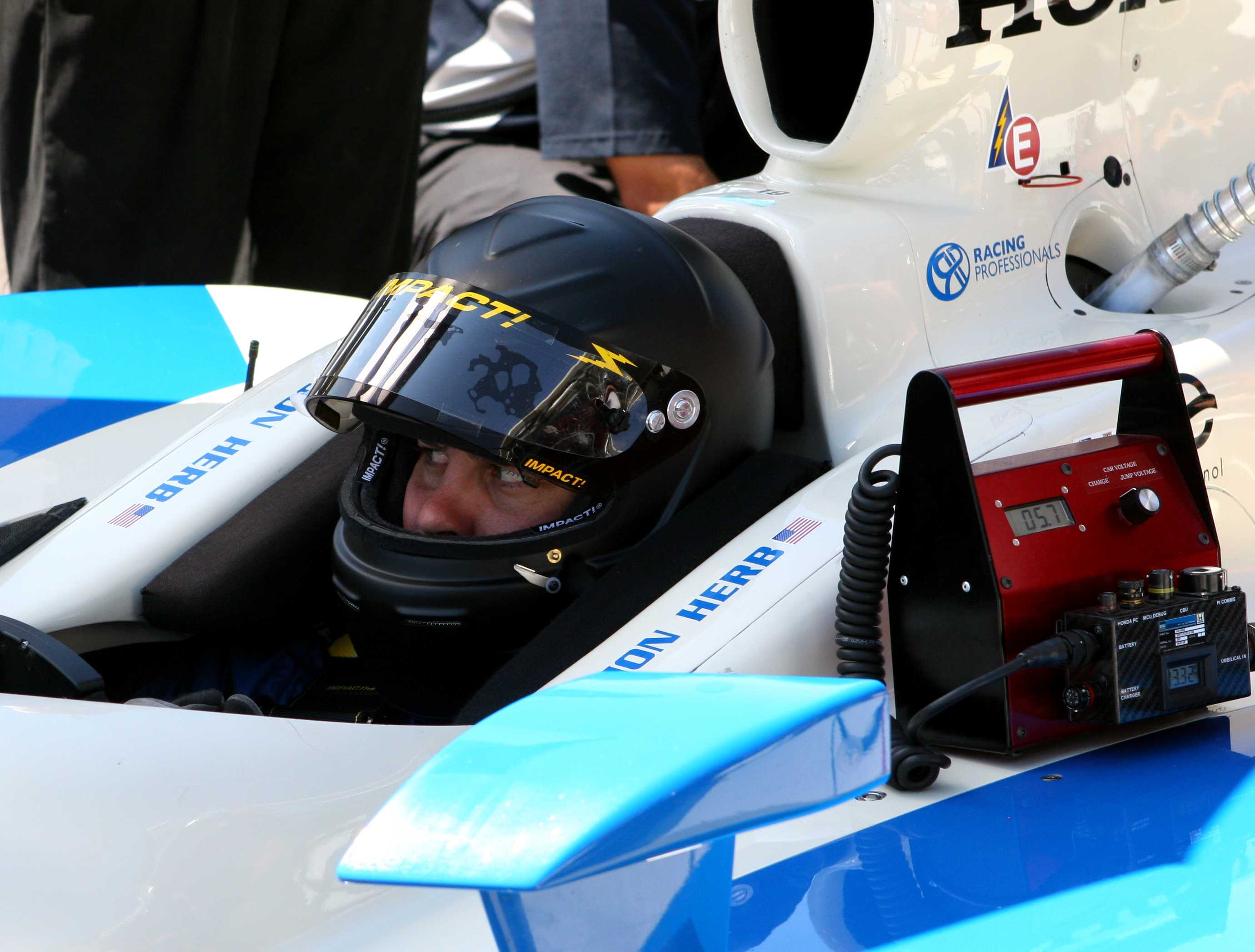
Herb prepares for a qualification attempt prior to the 2007 Indianapolis 500.

Herb intended to return to the IndyCar series for the 2006 Indianapolis 500 in a Playa Del Racing Panoz, of which he was a co-owner. However, he yielded the car to Roger Yasukawa, who qualified it for the race.

Herb qualified in the 27th starting position for the 2007 Indianapolis 500 and finished 32nd after crashing on lap 53.

Herb made two other starts in 2007. In June 2007, he raced at Texas, finishing twentieth after spinning entering the pits. At Michigan, he struggled with suspension problems, and finished twentieth after spinning. It was his final start.

Herb sold his team's cars to the league's pool of chassis for former Champ Car teams following open wheel unification prior to the 2008 IndyCar season.

== Child sexual abuse conviction ==
Herb was arrested by authorities in Collier County, Florida on October 4, 2013. He was charged with numerous counts of possession of child pornography. Herb's wife reportedly went to a police station after finding pictures of nude girls on Herb's laptop. Photos on the laptop also allegedly depicted Herb engaged in sexual acts with a girl who appeared to be four years old.

On January 4, 2016, Herb pleaded no contest to lewd and lascivious molestation and 13 counts of child pornography possession and was sentenced to 25 years in prison and lifetime probation. Under current Florida law he is required to serve at least 85% of his prison sentence.

== Career results ==
=== Complete American open–wheel racing results ===
(key) (Races in bold indicate pole position)

==== IRL IndyCar Series ====
Year	Team	No.	Chassis	Engine	1	2	3	4	5	6	7	8	9	10	11	12	13	14	15	16	17	Rank	Points	Ref
2000	Byrd-McCormack Racing	30	G-Force GF05	Oldsmobile Aurora V8	WDW; 22	PHX	LVS	INDY	TXS	PPIR	ATL	KTY	TX2									41st	8	
2001	Tri-Star Motorsports	6	Dallara IR-01	Oldsmobile Aurora V8	PHX	HMS; 25	ATL; 16	INDY; 27	TXS; Rpl	PPIR	RIR	KAN; 19	NSH	KTY	STL							23rd	70	
2001	PDM Racing	18	G-Force GF05B	Oldsmobile Aurora V8												CHI; 15	TX2; 9					23rd	70	
2002	Racing Professionals	16	G-Force GF05C	Chevrolet Indy V8	HMS; DNS	PHX; 11	FON; 19	NZR; 22	INDY; DNQ													31st	70	
2002	Racing Professionals	16	Dallara IR-02	Chevrolet Indy V8						TXS; 22	PPIR; 21	RIR; 19	KAN	NSH	MIS	KTY	STL	CHI	TX2			31st	70	
2006	Playa Del Racing	12	Panoz GF09C	Honda HI6R V8	HMS	STP	MOT	INDY; DNQ	WGL	TXS	RIR	KAN	NSH	MIL	MIS	KTY	SNM	CHI				NC	-	
2007	Racing Professionals	19	Dallara IR-05	Honda HI7R V8	HMS	STP	MOT	KAN	INDY; 32	MIL	TXS; 20	IOW	RIR	WGL	NSH	MDO	MIS; 20	KTY	SNM	DET	CHI	23rd	34	

Years	Teams	Races	Poles	Wins	Podiums (non-win)	Top 10s (non-podium)	Indianapolis 500 wins	Championships
5	4	16	0	0	0	1	0	0

==== Indianapolis 500 ====
Year	Chassis	Engine	Start	Finish	Team
2001	Dallara	Oldsmobile	18th	27th	Tri-Star
2002	G-Force	Chevrolet	Failed to Qualify		Racing Professionals
2006	Panoz	Honda	driven by R. Yasukawa		Playa Del
2007	Dallara	Honda	27th	32nd	Racing Professionals

==== Indy Lights ====
Year	Team	1	2	3	4	5	6	7	8	9	10	11	12	13	14	Rank	Points
2004	Racing Professionals Matt Young Motorsports	HMS	PHX	INDY; 17	KAN	NSH	MIL	MIS	KTY	PPIR	CHI	FON; 6	TXS; 7			**18th**	**67**
2005	Racing Professionals Matt Young Motorsports	HMS; 3	PHX; 1	STP; 11	INDY; 13	TXS; 7	IMS; 9	NSH; 6	MIL; 4	KTY; 11	PPIR; 11	SNM; 9	CHI; 4	WGL; 11	FON; 9	**7th**	**364**
2006	Racing Professionals Matt Young Motorsports	HMS; 6	STP1; 13	STP2; 9	INDY; 19	WGL; 8	IMS; 8	NSH	MIL	KTY	SNM1	SNM2	CHI			**11th**	**126**

Years	Teams	Races	Poles	Wins	Podiums (non-win)	Top 10s (non-podium)	Championships
3	1	23	0	1	1	15	0
