= 2007 Firestone Indy 400 =

Open-wheel race held in Brooklyn, Michigan

(United States) 2007 Firestone Indy 400
Race details
Race 13 of 17 in the 2007 IndyCar Series season
← Previous race	Next race →
- Layout of Michigan International Speedway
- Date: August 5, 2007
- Official name: Firestone Indy 400
- Location: Michigan International Speedway; Brooklyn, Michigan, United States
- Course: Permanent racing facility 2.000 mi / 3.219 km
- Distance: 200 laps 400.000 mi / 643.738 km
- Weather: Cloudy

Pole position
- Driver: (United Kingdom) Dario Franchitti (Andretti Green Racing)
- Time: 32.9810

Fastest lap
- Driver: (United States) Danica Patrick (Andretti Green Racing)
- Time: 32.9067 (on lap 4 of 200)

Podium
- First: (Brazil) Tony Kanaan (Andretti Green Racing)
- Second: (United States) Marco Andretti (Andretti Green Racing)
- Third: (United States) Scott Sharp (Rahal Letterman Racing)

The 2007 Firestone Indy 400 was an IRL IndyCar Series open-wheel race that was held on August 5, 2007, in Brooklyn, Michigan at Michigan International Speedway. It was the 13th round of the 2007 IRL IndyCar Series and the final American open-wheel car race at the track. Andretti Green Racing driver Tony Kanaan won the 200-lap race from the eighth starting position. Kanaan's teammate Marco Andretti finished second and Scott Sharp of Rahal Letterman Racing finished third.

Dario Franchitti, the points leader heading into the race, started on the pole position after posting the fastest lap during qualifications. The race was delayed by over four and a half hours due to rainfall. Franchitti led most of the race's first 50 laps before stalling his engine during a pit stop, forcing him to drop to the rear of the field. By lap 63, he made his way back to the front, but was heavily challenged by Dan Wheldon. The two drivers battled alongside each other for the lead until their wheels touched on lap 144, which sparked a multi-car pileup in which Franchitti pirouetted in the air; none of the drivers involved were injured. Soon after the race's final restart on the 171st lap, Kanaan, Andretti, and Danica Patrick got by Sharp, though Patrick's chances of earning her first win were ruined when she pitted for a blown tire on lap 186. Kanaan successfully fended off Andretti's attempts to overtake him on the outside line and earned the victory.

Six cautions slowed the event and the lead was traded 23 times between nine drivers. The win was Kanaan's third of the season and tenth in the IndyCar Series. (Note: Counting his one previous win in CART-sanctioned races, this was Kanaan's 11th career victory in American open-wheel car racing.) Despite Franchitti's poor finish, he maintained his 24-point gap over Scott Dixon in the Drivers' Championship standings, with four races left in the season.

== Background ==
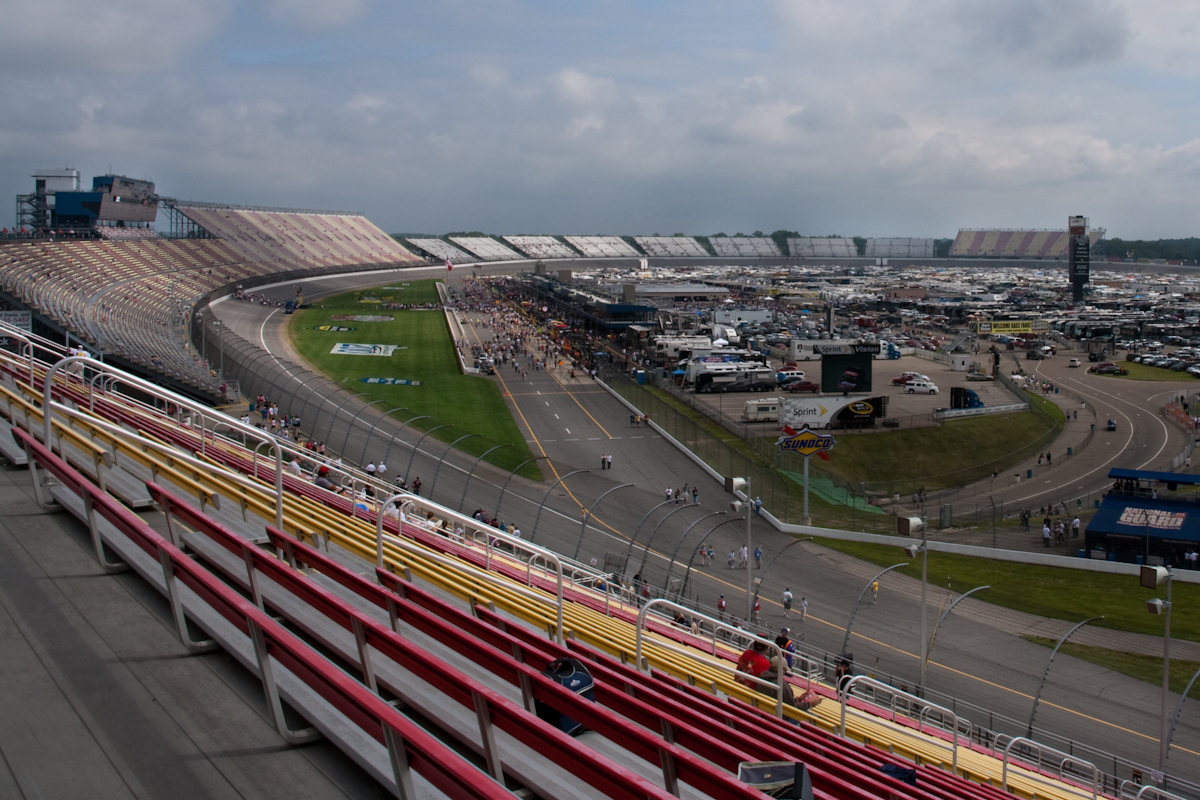
Michigan International Speedway (pictured in 2010), where the race was held.

The Firestone Indy 400 was the 13th of 17 scheduled open-wheel races for the 2007 IRL IndyCar Series and the 56th American open-wheel car race at the track, counting the races sanctioned by the United States Auto Club (1968, 1970–1978) and Championship Auto Racing Teams (CART; 1979–2001). It was held on August 5, 2007, in Brooklyn, Michigan, United States, at Michigan International Speedway, a four-turn 2 mi (3.2 km) asphalt tri-oval track with 18-degree banking in the corners, 12-degree banking in the front stretch, and 5-degree banking in the back stretch, and was contested over 200 laps and 400 miles (640 km). The race was the last to be included in the IndyCar Series' 2007 schedule, and was initially planned to be held on July 22 before being moved back to August 5 in order to accommodate for the series' inaugural event at Mid-Ohio Sports Car Course.

Heading into the race, Dario Franchitti earned 474 points and held a 24-point lead over Scott Dixon in the Drivers' Championship standings. Tony Kanaan was third on 363 points, six points ahead of fourth-placed Dan Wheldon and 18 more than Sam Hornish Jr. in fifth. Dixon had won the three preceding IndyCar Series races leading up to the Firestone Indy 400, but he admitted that Franchitti's consistency throughout the season made it tougher for him to close the gap on his points lead. Defending race winner Hélio Castroneves opined that Franchitti had the advantage of his three teammates who were capable of stealing points from Dixon. Franchitti looked forward to returning to the track after a week off and aimed to win the race at Michigan. Kanaan, a fellow Andretti Green Racing driver, reminisced of his prior successes at the track and hoped to battle with Franchitti and Dixon for the title.

Twenty cars were entered for the race at Michigan, up from 18 in the previous round at Mid-Ohio, all of which utilized the Dallara IR-05 chassis, tires supplied by Firestone, and Honda Indy V8 engines powered with ethanol fuel. Rookie driver Milka Duno planned to compete in the two preceding races at Nashville Superspeedway and Mid-Ohio, but injuries sustained in a testing crash at Nashville forced her to miss both races. She was medically cleared to race at Michigan and received assistance from former IndyCar Series driver Tomáš Enge in preparing the setup of her car. Jon Herb, who had not raced in the IndyCar Series since the Bombardier Learjet 550 in June, gained enough sponsorship to compete in the event and hoped to race in the season-ending Peak Antifreeze Indy 300. The two drivers completed a rookie orientation session at Michigan ahead of the race weekend alongside Ryan Hunter-Reay, who made his abrupt series debut with Rahal Letterman Racing in the previous round, replacing Jeff Simmons.

It had already been determined that this would be the Indy Racing League (IRL)'s final event at Michigan International Speedway, as was confirmed by track officials in July 2007. Track president Roger Curtis explained that IRL officials planned to host their annual race at the track two weeks prior to one of the track's events for the NASCAR Nextel Cup Series, which he felt would create issues regarding the promotion of both races. Curtis expressed sorrow for the event's removal from the IndyCar Series calendar because of the track's long history with American open-wheel car racing and discussed the possibility of adding a road course to the track in order to attract other motorsport series besides NASCAR.

== Practice and qualifying ==
There were two 120-minute practice sessions on Saturday that preceded the raceon Sunday, both of which were split into two groups of drivers that each received 60 minutes of track time per session. The first practice session, held on Saturday morning, was led by Kanaan with a time of 33.0803 seconds, one hundredth of a second quicker than Dixon, with Hornish Jr., Franchitti, and Danica Patrick rounding out the top-five. The session was briefly paused after Duno slid into the inside line while exiting the fourth turn. Tomas Scheckter—the winner of the 2002 Michigan race—lapped quickest in the second practice session later that day with a time of 32.9999 seconds; Franchitti was second, Castroneves third, Patrick fourth, and Wheldon fifth. Herb caused the only stoppage of the session when he crashed into the SAFER barrier in the fourth corner.

The qualifying session, officially named the AAMCO Transmissions Pole Qualifying, was held 75 minutes after the second practice session ended. Each driver was required to complete up to two timed laps in their qualifying attempt, with the fastest of the two laps determining their starting position. With a time of 32.9810 seconds, Franchitti earned the fourth pole position of his IndyCar Series career, (Note: Counting his 12 previous pole positions in CART-sanctioned races, this was Franchitti's 16th career pole in American open-wheel car racing.) and was joined on the grid's front row by Hornish Jr., whose lap time trailed Franchitti by four hundredths of a second. Castroneves, Scott Sharp, and Wheldon rounded out the top five, and Scheckter and Dixon took the next two positions. Kanaan qualified eighth; he was only permitted to complete one lap after suffering an issue with his dashboard during his first qualifying attempt. Patrick's team was late to pre-qualifying technical inspection and was also forced to run a single lap, which earned her the ninth spot on the grid. Ed Carpenter started 10th, ahead of eleventh-placed Vítor Meira, who failed technical inspection and only ran one lap. The remaining positions on the grid were occupied by Hunter-Reay, Marco Andretti, Kosuke Matsuura, A. J. Foyt IV, Sarah Fisher, Buddy Rice, Darren Manning, Duno, and Herb, the latter of whom did not participate in qualifications due to his crash earlier that day.

=== Qualifying classification ===
Final qualifying results
Pos.	No.	Driver	Team	Time	Speed	Grid
1	27	(United Kingdom) Dario Franchitti	Andretti Green Racing	32.9810	218.308	1
2	6	(United States) Sam Hornish Jr.	Team Penske	33.0239	218.024	2
3	3	(Brazil) Hélio Castroneves	Team Penske	33.0436	217.894	3
4	8	(United States) Scott Sharp	Rahal Letterman Racing	33.0835	217.631	4
5	10	(United Kingdom) Dan Wheldon	Chip Ganassi Racing	33.1113	217.448	5
6	2	(South Africa) Tomas Scheckter	Vision Racing	33.1135	217.434	6
7	9	(New Zealand) Scott Dixon	Chip Ganassi Racing	33.1234	217.369	7
8	11	(Brazil) Tony Kanaan	Andretti Green Racing	33.1504	217.192	8
9	7	(United States) Danica Patrick	Andretti Green Racing	33.1848	216.967	9
10	20	(United States) Ed Carpenter	Vision Racing	33.2879	216.295	10
11	4	(Brazil) Vítor Meira	Panther Racing	33.3399	215.957	11
12	17	(United States) Ryan Hunter-Reay	Rahal Letterman Racing	33.3521	215.878	12
13	26	(United States) Marco Andretti	Andretti Green Racing	33.3629	215.809	13
14	55	(Japan) Kosuke Matsuura	Panther Racing	33.4307	215.371	14
15	22	(United States) A. J. Foyt IV	Vision Racing	33.4363	215.335	15
16	5	(United States) Sarah Fisher	Dreyer & Reinbold Racing	33.4422	215.297	16
17	15	(United States) Buddy Rice	Dreyer & Reinbold Racing	33.5103	214.859	17
18	14	(United Kingdom) Darren Manning	A. J. Foyt Racing	33.6174	214.175	18
19	23	(Venezuela) Milka Duno	SAMAX Motorsport	33.8185	212.901	19
20	19	(United States) Jon Herb	Racing Professionals	—	—	20

== Race ==
Although the race was scheduled to start around 12:00 p.m. Eastern Daylight Time (UTC−04:00), heavy rainfall that began the night prior forced IRL officials to push the start of the race back by four hours and 37 minutes. When the rain finally subsided, the skies remained cloudy around the track with air temperatures measured at 73 °F (23 °C) and track temperatures at 80 °F (27 °C). Live television coverage of the race in the United States was moved from ESPN2 to ESPN Classic as a result of the delay, with Marty Reid and Scott Goodyear providing commentary. Four-time Indianapolis 500 winner Al Unser commanded the drivers to start their engines and three-time Indianapolis 500 winner Johnny Rutherford drove the pace car. An additional warm-up lap was permitted by the IRL in order to help drivers warm their tires, engines, and gearboxes.

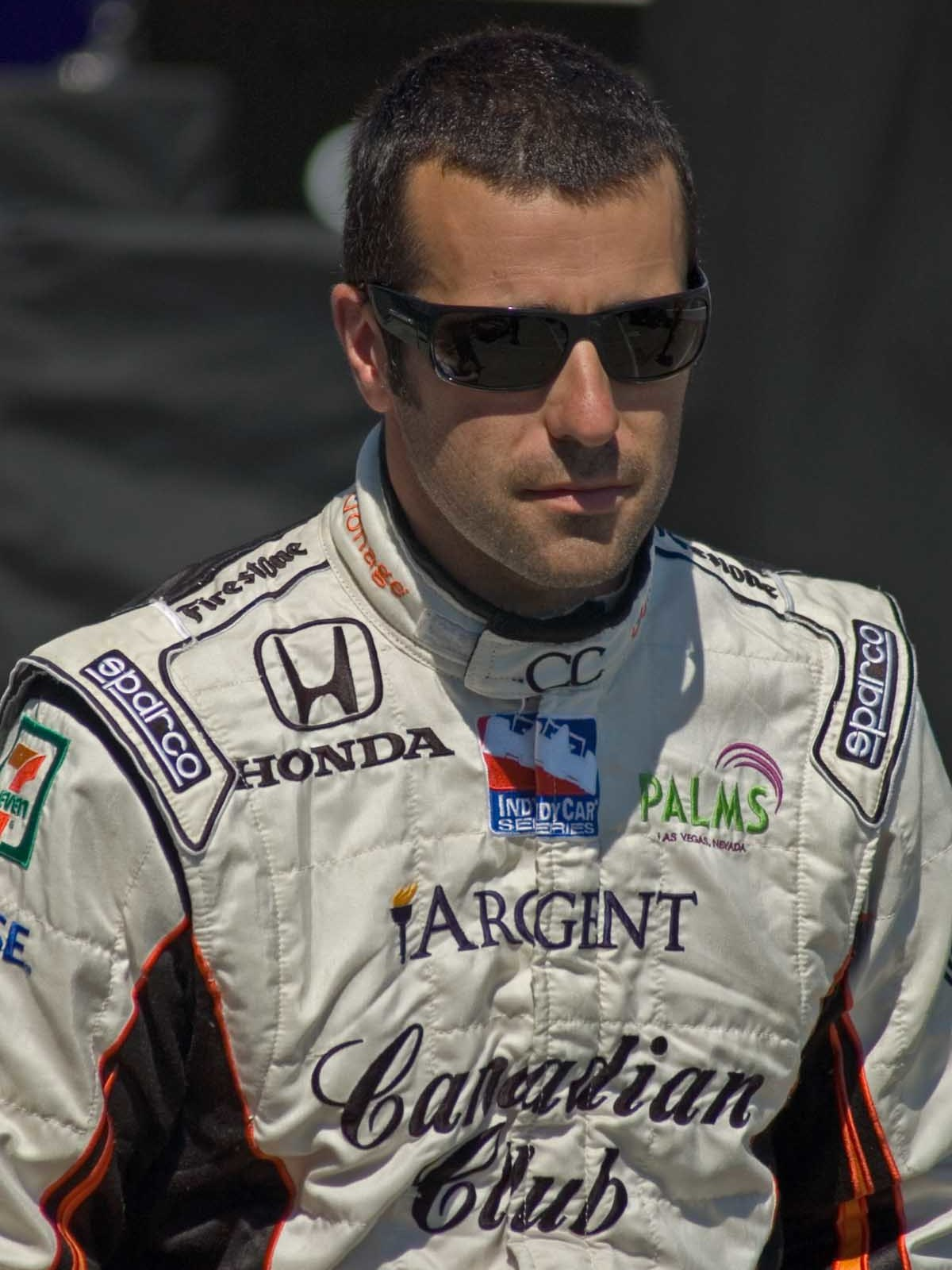
Dario Franchitti (pictured in 2007) led the most laps, but retired from the race after crashing upside-down on lap 144.

Franchitti maintained his pole position advantage at the start of the race and pulled ahead of Hornish Jr. in the fourth turn by the end of lap one. Two laps later, Dixon had moved into the fifth position; he and his teammate Wheldon then overtook Sharp for fourth and fifth, respectively, on the fifth lap, while Herb entered pit road to alleviate his overheating engine. Hornish Jr. remained within no more than three tenths of a second behind Franchitti until the 29th lap, when the rear of Herb's car slammed the outside wall in the second turn, prompting the first caution flag of the race. All of the leaders made pit stops for new tires and fuel, along with front wing adjustments for several drivers. Franchitti exited pit road first and thus led the field back up to speed on lap 35, ahead of Hornish Jr., Dixon, Castroneves, and Kanaan. Patrick dove to the left-hand side of Wheldon and Scheckter in the third turn and overtook them both for sixth place, while Kanaan improved to the second position by the 38th lap. One lap later, Castroneves, Dixon, and Wheldon raced three-abreast for fourth; Dixon passed both drivers on lap 40.

The second caution was issued on the 46th lap for Duno, whose car slowed to a halt in the fourth turn due to a fuel pressure issue. All of the leaders entered pit road two laps later, and Franchitti's engine stalled as he attempted to drive away from pit road, allowing Dixon to assume the lead position; Franchitti, meanwhile, dropped to 18th. Dixon led the field on the lap-51 restart, followed by Kanaan, Wheldon, Castroneves, and Hornish Jr. Wheldon overtook Kanaan for second place on the 52nd lap and Franchitti made his way into the top ten positions two laps later. By lap 57, Franchitti had passed Wheldon for the second position. Castroneves and Meira's cars then collided into each other and slammed into the outside barrier on the front stretch, prompting the race's third caution. More pit stops were completed for the leaders; while Hornish Jr. was forced to enter pit road a second time for additional adjustments, Franchitti retained the lead ahead of the restart on lap 70, with Scheckter, Dixon, Manning, and Sharp rounding out the top five positions.

Kanaan and Wheldon overtook Manning and Sharp for the fourth and fifth positions, respectively, on the 71st lap. Franchitti, meanwhile, extended his gap over Scheckter to 0.2 seconds before the fourth caution was flown on lap 84 when Fisher backed into the turn-two wall. Wheldon took the first position during pit stops and led the field at the restart on the 91st lap, followed by Franchitti, Kanaan, Andretti, and Dixon. On lap 92, Franchitti drove to Wheldon's right hand side to reclaim the lead; the two drivers drove alongside each other until lap 94, with Franchitti maintaining his lead. Meanwhile, Hornish Jr. had made his way up to eighth place by the 97th lap, while Sheckter and Patrick battled with Wheldon within the top five by lap 110. Franchitti's 0.4-second lead over Kanaan was diminished four laps later when Manning slammed the turn-four wall with the rear of his car, bringing out the race's fifth caution.

After more pit stops for new tires and fuel, Franchitti held onto the lead for the lap-121 restart; Wheldon, Scheckter, Patrick, and Dixon rounded out the top five. Patrick promptly overtook Scheckter for third place on the front stretch. Wheldon drove on the outside line next to Franchitti and took the lead once again after receiving a push from Scheckter on the 123rd lap. As Hornish Jr. moved up to the fourth position, Franchitti swerved up the track and remained close in Wheldon's trail. The two drivers swapped the lead several times over the next 21 laps, with Franchitti leading on lap 126, Wheldon on lap 127, Franchitti on lap 129, Wheldon on lap 130, Franchitti on lap 135, and Wheldon on the 136th lap. Although Scheckter never led a lap, he also made several bids to take the lead. On the 144th lap, Wheldon's right-front tire made contact with Franchitti's left-rear tire as they raced for the lead on the back stretch, sending Franchitti's car pirouetting about 20 feet (6.1 m) in the air and upside-down. With little time to react, Dixon and Foyt IV piled into Franchitti, while Hornish Jr., Carpenter, and Scheckter were also taken out in the accident, which caused the sixth caution to be issued. Hornish Jr. exited his damaged car to help track marshals lift Franchitti's car upright. Franchitti and everyone else involved were unhurt.

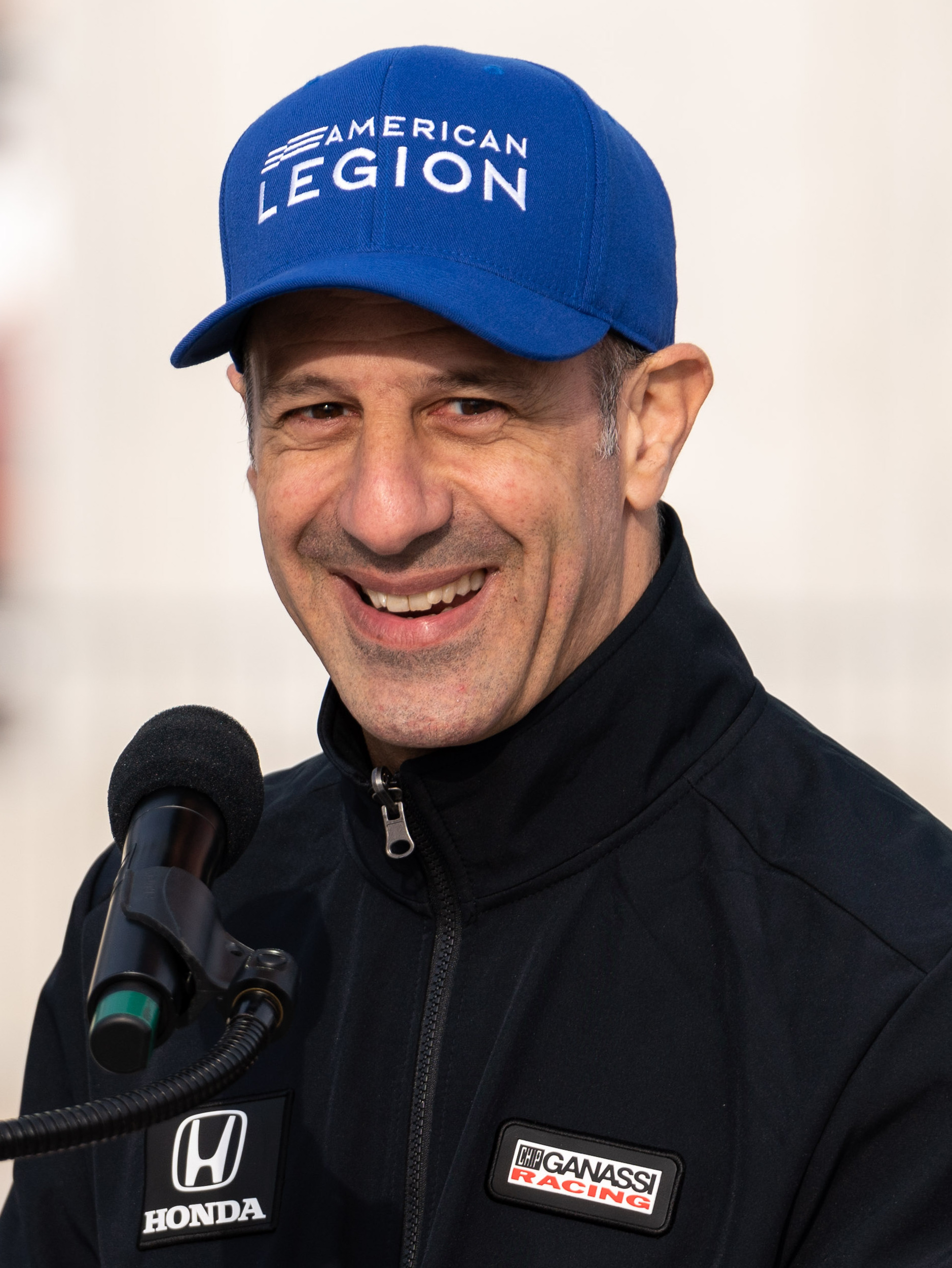
Tony Kanaan (pictured in 2022) led the last 28 laps and won the race.

Patrick escaped the melee to assume the lead, but a mistake during her pit stop allowed Andretti to overtake her on lap 147. During the lengthy caution period which allowed marshals to clean up the track, several drivers pitted to fill up their fuel tanks, including leader Andretti on the 158th lap. Patrick assumed the lead for the next three laps before she entered pit road as well, allowing Sharp to take the first position. Although he was several laps down, Dixon rejoined the race on the 168th lap after his team made extensive repairs. Andretti was placed sixth ahead of the restart on lap 171, but overtook teammate Patrick and executed a slingshot pass on the outermost line to get by Sharp, Kanaan, Hunter-Reay, and Matsuura for the first position. However, IRL officials handed a penalty to Andretti for his jump start over the rest of the field. Andretti opted to give up his positions in order to avoid a drive-through penalty.

On the 173rd lap, Sharp fell from first to third place after being passed by Kanaan and Andretti on the back stretch. Hornish Jr. reentered the race three laps later to gain more points. Dixon, meanwhile, officially retired from the race on lap 177 after taking the ninth position. Patrick had also taken third place from Sharp. She ran steadily behind teammates Kanaan and Andretti until her right-rear tire deflated on the 186th lap, forcing her to make an unscheduled pit stop. Throughout the last 13 laps of the race, Andretti stayed within a tenth of a second of Kanaan's lead and made several attempts to overtake him on the outside line. Kanaan utilized the inside line to his advantage and successfully held off Andretti to score his tenth IndyCar Series victory. Andretti finished in second place, 0.0595 seconds in arrears, with Sharp taking the third finishing position. The final classified finishers were Matsuura, Rice, Hunter-Reay, and Patrick. The race was slowed by six cautions and had 23 lead changes between nine drivers. Franchitti led eight times for a total of 101 laps, the most of any driver.

=== Post-race ===
Kanaan performed doughnuts on the front stretch before driving to victory lane to celebrate his third of a season-high five wins, which earned him $110,800 (USD), with his teammates. Although Kanaan was disappointed that Michigan International Speedway was excluded from the series' 2008 schedule, he was disapproving of the pack racing throughout the event, stating: "I definitely think a lot of people disrespected each other out there, and it's not anybody's fault besides ours and the Indy Racing League not to take the measures with the drivers that have been driving a crazy race." Andretti, who finished second, stated that his team removing the diffuser from his car "made a difference for us," although he acknowledged that he "just didn't have enough speed like we had in a big pack at the end to get by [Kanaan]." Third-place finisher Sharp thanked his pit crew for repairing his car after ramming into the rear of Hornish Jr.'s car during the lap-144 accident and was pleased that he earned a lot of points. It wound up being the final podium finish of his IndyCar Series career.

An uninjured Franchitti explained his thoughts about his flip on lap 144: "[Me and Wheldon] touched and the next thing I knew I was upside down going backward. I thought, 'This isn't good.' [...] When I stopped and realized I was in one piece, I couldn't believe it. I'm a lucky guy." He also attributed his survival of the crash to the Dallara chassis, as the roll hoop remained intact despite being hit by two other cars. However, during a press conference leading up to the succeeding Meijer Indy 300 at Kentucky Speedway, Franchitti revealed he sent Wheldon a text message with "strong language" after watching a replay of the incident. Wheldon, a former teammate and friend of Franchitti, took offense to the message and avoided speaking to him. Castroneves and Meira were similarly at odds over their lap-58 crash, with Castroneves confronting Meira immediately after exiting his car. He later claimed that Meira, whom he had great respect for, was too aggressive in the early portions of the race. Meira pinned the blame on Castroneves, opining that he held his line in the middle of the track. Castroneves suffered a sore right knee in his incident, while Fisher strained her neck and Manning's right knee was stapled twice to heal a laceration as a result of their respective crashes.

Because of the race's result, Franchitti kept his lead in the Drivers' Championship standings with 494 points; Dixon held second on 470, while Kanaan's 413 points maintained his third position. Wheldon and Hornish Jr. rounded out the top five with 375 and 367 points, respectively, as four races remained in the season. Although the close-quarters racing received criticism, many drivers pushed for the IRL to reconcile with Michigan International Speedway due to the action in the race. Roger Curtis admitted that he had discussed hosting an IndyCar Series event in 2008 with IRL officials several times throughout the weekend. This never ended up materializing, however, and the series has not returned to the track as of 2026.

=== Race classification ===
Final race results
Pos	No.	Driver	Team	Laps	Time/Retired	Grid	Points
1	11	(Brazil) Tony Kanaan	Andretti Green Racing	200	2:49:38.0509	8	50
2	26	(United States) Marco Andretti	Andretti Green Racing	200	+0.0595	13	40
3	8	(United States) Scott Sharp	Rahal Letterman Racing	200	+0.3867	4	35
4	55	(Japan) Kosuke Matsuura	Panther Racing	200	+0.4703	14	32
5	15	(United States) Buddy Rice	Dreyer & Reinbold Racing	200	+4.9097	17	30
6	17	(United States) Ryan Hunter-Reay	Rahal Letterman Racing	200	+10.0114	12	28
7	7	(United States) Danica Patrick	Andretti Green Racing	199	+1 lap	9	26
8	22	(United States) A. J. Foyt IV	Vision Racing	167	Handling	15	24
9	6	(United States) Sam Hornish Jr.	Team Penske	148	Handling	2	22
10	9	(New Zealand) Scott Dixon	Chip Ganassi Racing	145	Handling	7	20
11	2	(South Africa) Tomas Scheckter	Vision Racing	144	Accident	6	19
12	10	(United Kingdom) Dan Wheldon	Chip Ganassi Racing	143	Accident	5	18
13	27	(United Kingdom) Dario Franchitti	Andretti Green Racing	143	Accident	1	20^{1}
14	20	(United States) Ed Carpenter	Vision Racing	143	Accident	10	16
15	14	(United Kingdom) Darren Manning	A. J. Foyt Racing	113	Accident	18	15
16	5	(United States) Sarah Fisher	Dreyer & Reinbold Racing	83	Accident	16	14
17	3	(Brazil) Hélio Castroneves	Team Penske	58	Accident	3	13
18	4	(Brazil) Vítor Meira	Panther Racing	58	Accident	11	12
19	23	(Venezuela) Milka Duno	SAMAX Motorsport	43	Fuel pressure	19	12
20	19	(United States) Jon Herb	Racing Professionals	26	Accident	20	12

Notes

- ^1 — Includes three bonus points for leading the most laps.

== Championship standings after the race ==
Drivers' Championship standings
+/-	Pos.	Driver	Points
Unchanged	1	(United Kingdom) Dario Franchitti	494
Unchanged	2	(New Zealand) Scott Dixon	470 (–24)
Unchanged	3	(Brazil) Tony Kanaan	413 (–81)
Unchanged	4	(United Kingdom) Dan Wheldon	375 (–119)
Unchanged	5	(United States) Sam Hornish Jr.	367 (–127)
Sources:

- Note: Only the top five positions are included.

== Notes ==
Previous race: 2007 Honda 200	IndyCar Series; 2007 season	Next race: 2007 Meijer Indy 300
Previous race: 2006 Firestone Indy 400	Firestone Indy 400	Next race: —
