= Heath Pearce =

American soccer player

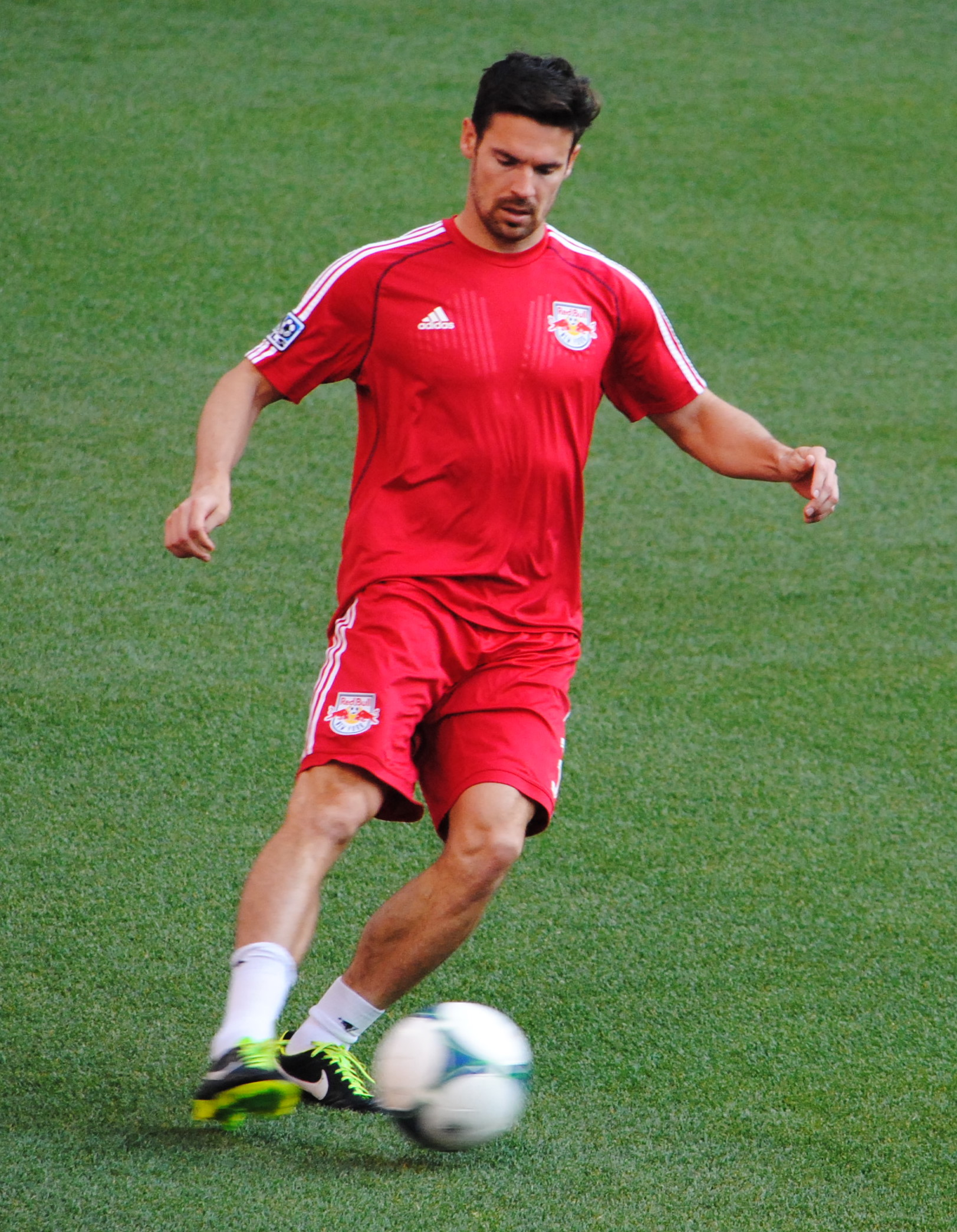

Personal information
- Full name: Heath Gregory Pearce
- Date of birth: August 13, 1984 (age 42)
- Place of birth: Modesto, California, United States
- Height: 6 ft 0 in (1.83 m)
- Positions: Center back; full back

Youth career
- –2001: IMG Soccer Academy

College career
| Years | Team | Apps | (Gls) |
| 2002–2004 | Portland Pilots | | |

Senior career*
| Years | Team | Apps | (Gls) |
| 2005–2007 | FC Nordsjælland | 75 | (2) |
| 2007–2009 | Hansa Rostock | 31 | (0) |
| 2009–2010 | FC Dallas | 34 | (0) |
| 2011–2012 | Chivas USA | 40 | (0) |
| 2012–2013 | New York Red Bulls | 32 | (2) |
| 2014 | Montreal Impact | 23 | (0) |
| 2015 | IFK Göteborg | 0 | (0) |
| Total | | 235 | (4) |

International career
| 2000–2001 | United States U17 | 4 | (2) |
| 2003 | United States U18 | 1 | (0) |
| 2003 | United States U20 | 3 | (0) |
| 2005–2012 | United States | 35 | (0) |
Medal record
Representing United States
FIFA Confederations Cup
| Runner-up | 2009 South Africa | Team |
CONCACAF Gold Cup
| Runner-up | CONCACAF Gold Cup | 2009 |
Men's Soccer
- * Club domestic league appearances and goals

Heath Pearce (born August 13, 1984) is an American former professional soccer player who played as a defender for teams in Europe and North America. He represented his national team on 35 occasions. Pearce is the host of "The Mixer," "KPR" (Kick Power Rankings) and "WTF" (Walk Talk Football), all programs on the YouTube channel COPA90 US (formerly known as KICKTV).

== Club career ==
=== College and amateur ===
Pearce played his high school soccer at Peter Johansen High School in Modesto, California before playing his college soccer at the University of Portland, where he was an All-West Coast Conference honorable mention selection. In his final year at Portland, he started all 20 games, scoring two goals and racking up five assists.

During his college years he also played for the Bradenton Academics in the USL Premier Development League.

=== FC Nordsjælland ===
Pearce signed with FC Nordsjælland and began his professional career in the 2004–05 Danish Superliga season. He made 75 league appearances and scored two goals for club in his two and a half seasons there.

=== Hansa Rostock ===
After stating that he would leave Nordsjælland after the 2007 season with a goal to be signed by a team in Germany, Scotland, or the Netherlands, Pearce signed a two-year contract with Hansa Rostock on July 16, 2007. In January 2008, Pearce was briefly suspended for being late to return to the club from international duty, but was eventually allowed back on the team. On April 13, 2009, Pearce was permanently suspended from Hansa Rostock's first team and demoted to the reserve squad. At the end of the season, Pearce was released from his contract.

=== FC Dallas ===
On September 2, 2009, Pearce reportedly signed a two-year contract with Turkish team Bursaspor, but the next day it had emerged that a deal was not reached until after the transfer window had closed. After his failed move to Turkey, he signed with Major League Soccer side FC Dallas on September 11, 2009. In his first full season in Dallas Pearce helped the club to the 2010 MLS Cup final.

=== Chivas USA ===
On February 15, 2011, after two seasons with Dallas, Pearce was traded to Chivas USA in return for allocation money. Pearce was traded to New York Red Bulls on May 17, 2012, with allocation money and future considerations in exchange for forward Juan Agudelo. Pearce scored his first MLS goal on June 20 versus the Vancouver Whitecaps helping New York to earn a 1–1 draw with his late equalizer.

=== New York Red Bulls ===
Midway through the 2013 season, Pearce elected to have hip surgery that ruled him out for the remainder of the season. New York and Pearce mutually parted ways at the end of the 2013 MLS season. He entered the 2013 MLS Re-Entry Draft but was not selected.

=== Montreal Impact ===
On March 6, 2014, Pearce signed with Montreal Impact. Pearce appeared in 29 matches in his lone season in Montreal. After one season in Montreal, in December 2014 Pearce was selected by Orlando City SC in the 2014 MLS Expansion Draft.

=== IFK Göteborg ===
On January 29, 2015, Pearce signed a five-month-long contract with Allsvenskan club IFK Göteborg.

== International career ==
Pearce made his international debut in November 2005 against Scotland. Pearce was included by Bruce Arena in United States training camps and friendly matches prior to the 2006 FIFA World Cup but did not make the team.

Under Bob Bradley, Pearce became a regular starter for the national team. With relatively little competition in the U.S. player pool at left back, Pearce played the most minutes of any American field player in 2008. But as his club situation deteriorated, Pearce has seen less time with national team. Though a member of the squad at the 2009 FIFA Confederations Cup, he did not make an appearance in the tournament as Jonathan Bornstein and Carlos Bocanegra were the preferred choices. Pearce was a member of the second-tier U.S. team for the 2009 CONCACAF Gold Cup. Lately he has not seen much action due to the return of Bornstein and also Bocanegra and Jonathan Spector both being versatile enough to play in that position.

Pearce was included on the 30-man preliminary roster for the 2010 FIFA World Cup, but did not make the final 23 man squad.

== Personal life ==
Pearce has one younger adopted sister and two brothers. His sister Lindsay has starred in the TV series The Glee Project where she won a role on the Fox hit show Glee.

Pearce is an avid car and racing enthusiast. He has partnered with Matt Young as a co-owner in a professional sports car racing venture, Matt Young Motorsports with Heath Pearce.

Pearce now works in the field of media and broadcast. He has replaced his former Chivas USA teammate Jimmy Conrad as host of the YouTube channel KICK, now known as COPA90 US. Since 2023, Pearce has been a match analyst for MLS Season Pass on Apple TV.

== Career statistics ==
=== Club ===
As of March 14, 2015

Appearances and goals by club, season and competition
| Club | Season | League | | | Cup | | Continental | | Total | |
| Club | Season | Division | Apps | Goals | Apps | Goals | Apps | Goals | Apps | Goals |
|---|---|---|---|---|---|---|---|---|---|---|
| Portland Pilots | 2002 | | 20 | 2 | — | | — | | 20 | 2 |
| Portland Pilots | 2003 | | 20 | 1 | — | | — | | 20 | 1 |
| Portland Pilots | 2004 | | 22 | 5 | — | | — | | 22 | 5 |
| Portland Pilots | Total | | 62 | 8 | 0 | 0 | 0 | 0 | 62 | 8 |
| Bradenton Academics | 2003 | | 11 | 1 | 1 | 0 | — | | 12 | 1 |
| FC Nordsjælland | 2004–05 | Danish Superliga | 15 | 0 | 0 | 0 | — | | 15 | 0 |
| FC Nordsjælland | 2005–06 | Danish Superliga | 31 | 1 | 0 | 0 | — | | 31 | 1 |
| FC Nordsjælland | 2006–07 | Danish Superliga | 29 | 1 | 0 | 0 | — | | 29 | 1 |
| FC Nordsjælland | Total | | 75 | 2 | 0 | 0 | 0 | 0 | 75 | 2 |
| Hansa Rostock | 2007–08 | Bundesliga | 19 | 0 | 2 | 0 | — | | 21 | 0 |
| Hansa Rostock | 2008–09 | 2. Bundesliga | 12 | 0 | 1 | 0 | — | | 13 | 0 |
| Hansa Rostock | 2009–10 | 2. Bundesliga | 0 | 0 | 0 | 0 | — | | 0 | 0 |
| Hansa Rostock | Total | | 31 | 0 | 3 | 0 | 0 | 0 | 34 | 0 |
| FC Dallas | 2009 | Major League Soccer | 6 | 0 | — | | — | | 6 | 0 |
| FC Dallas | 2010 | Major League Soccer | 28 | 0 | 1 | 0 | — | | 29 | 0 |
| FC Dallas | Total | | 34 | 0 | 1 | 0 | 0 | 0 | 35 | 0 |
| Chivas USA | 2011 | Major League Soccer | 30 | 0 | 1 | 0 | — | | 31 | 0 |
| Chivas USA | 2012 | Major League Soccer | 10 | 0 | — | | — | | 10 | 0 |
| Chivas USA | Total | | 40 | 0 | 1 | 0 | 0 | 0 | 41 | 0 |
| New York Red Bulls | 2012 | Major League Soccer | 18 | 2 | 2 | 1 | — | | 20 | 3 |
| New York Red Bulls | 2013 | Major League Soccer | 14 | 0 | 2 | 0 | — | | 16 | 0 |
| New York Red Bulls | Total | | 32 | 2 | 4 | 1 | 0 | 0 | 36 | 3 |
| Montreal Impact | 2014 | Major League Soccer | 23 | 0 | 4 | 0 | 2 | 0 | 29 | 0 |
| IFK Göteborg | 2015 | Allsvenskan | 0 | 0 | 3 | 0 | — | | 3 | 0 |
| Career total | | | 308 | 13 | 17 | 1 | 2 | 0 | 327 | 14 |

=== International ===
As of January 25, 2012

Appearances and goals by national team and year
| National team | Year | Apps | Goals |
|---|---|---|---|
| United States | 2005 | 1 | 0 |
| United States | 2006 | 4 | 0 |
| United States | 2007 | 5 | 0 |
| United States | 2008 | 11 | 0 |
| United States | 2009 | 7 | 0 |
| United States | 2010 | 5 | 0 |
| United States | 2011 | 0 | 0 |
| United States | 2012 | 2 | 0 |
| Total | | 35 | 0 |

== Honors ==
Portland Pilots

- West Coast Conference Regular Season: 2002

FC Dallas

- Major League Soccer Western Conference Championship: 2010

New York Red Bulls

- Major League Soccer Supporters' Shield: 2013

Montreal Impact

- Canadian Championship: 2014

IFK Göteborg

- Svenska Cupen: 2014–15
