= 2007 Indianapolis 500 =

American motor race

91st Indianapolis 500

Indianapolis Motor Speedway

Indianapolis 500
- Sanctioning body: Indy Racing League
- Season: 2007 IndyCar season
- Date: May 27, 2007
- Winner: (United Kingdom) Dario Franchitti
- Winning Chief Mechanic: Jeff Grahn
- Time of race: 2:44:03.5608
- Average speed: 151.774
- Pole position: (Brazil) Hélio Castroneves
- Pole speed: 225.817
- Fastest qualifier: (Brazil) Hélio Castroneves
- Rookie of the Year: (United States) Phil Giebler
- Most laps led: (Brazil) Tony Kanaan (83)

Pre-race ceremonies
- National anthem: Members of United States Armed Forces
- "Back Home Again in Indiana": Race fans & the Purdue Band
- Starting command: Mari Hulman George
- Pace car: Chevrolet Corvette
- Pace car driver: Patrick Dempsey
- Starter: Bryan Howard
- Honorary starter: Peyton Manning
- Estimated attendance: 300,000+ (estimated)

Television in the United States
- Network: ESPN on ABC
- Announcers: Marty Reid, Scott Goodyear, and Rusty Wallace
- Nielsen ratings: 4.3 / 12

Chronology
Previous	Next
2006	2008

The 91st Indianapolis 500 was held at the Indianapolis Motor Speedway in Speedway, Indiana on Sunday May 27, 2007. It was the twelfth Indianapolis 500 sanctioned by the Indy Racing League and the fifth race of the 2007 IndyCar Series season. Hélio Castroneves started the race on the pole position. This would be the final Indy 500 held during the "Split" as the open wheel unification would take place in early 2008.

The race began at 1:11 p.m. EDT, and was televised in the United States on the ABC. The race was broadcast in high-definition for the first time. The race also was carried live on the IMS Radio Network and XM Satellite Radio.

On lap 113, the race underwent a lengthy rain delay, with Tony Kanaan tentatively sitting as the leader. After three hours, the rain ceased, the track was dried, and the race restarted shortly before 6:15 p.m. EDT. A crash on lap 162 between Dan Wheldon and Marco Andretti brought out the yellow flag with Dario Franchitti leading. Under the caution, rain began falling again and officials halted the race on lap 166. Dario Franchitti was declared the winner after leading 34 laps during the race.

All entries utilized ethanol, after 42 years of utilizing methanol. As part of a two-year roll-out, the cars used a 10% ethanol blend in 2006, and for 2007, the cars utilized a full ethanol mixture. Although branded as "100% percent fuel-grade", the fuel was actually a denatured 98% ethanol/2% gasoline blend (E98). The 2007 race was also the final 500 to see the Panoz chassis in competition. Jim Nabors, who sang "Back Home Again in Indiana" during the pre-race festivities twenty-nine times from 1972 to 2006, missed the 2007 race due to an illness. The fans were asked to sing the song in his place.

== Race schedule ==
Race schedule — May 2007
Sun	Mon	Tue	Wed	Thu	Fri	Sat
		1	2	3	4	5 Mini-Marathon
6 ROP	7 ROP	8 Practice	9 Practice	10; Practice	11; Practice	12; Pole Day
13; Time Trials	14	15	16; Practice	17; Practice	18; Practice	19; Time Trials
20; Bump Day	21	22	23; Comm. Day	24	25; Carb Day	26; Parade
27; Indy 500	28; Memorial Day	29	30	31		

Color	Notes
Green	Practice
Dark Blue	Time trials
Silver	Race day
Red	Rained out*
Blank	No track activity

* Includes days where track activity
was significantly limited due to rain

ROP — denotes Rookie Orientation Program

Comm. Day — denotes 500 Festival Community Day

== Practice (week 1) ==
Unlike previous years, no testing took place prior to the start of official May activities. Private testing was banned for 2007, and no official open test was held. Dreyer & Reinbold Racing was fined $25,000 for the use of an illegal fuel mixture, containing 27% methanol (no methanol is allowed) in one of its cars during pole day. Team officials claimed this was due to an inexperienced crew member using an old container of fuel and was not intentional. Indy Racing League chief administrator Brian Barnhart called this "at least plausible," noting that the presence of water in the fuel mixture supports the claim that the fuel was old. The illegal mixture was used only during practice, not for a qualification attempt. From 1974 to 2005, only methanol fuel was used in the Indianapolis 500; and from 1965 to 1973, the rules were crafted in such a way to encourage the use of methanol in order to be competitive. In 2006, a 10% ethanol-90% methanol mixture had been used in the IRL in transition to the ethanol fuel used in the IRL for the 2007 season.

The initial official entry list was released on April 10, 2007, featuring 69 cars, four former winners, and one rookie.

=== Sunday May 6, 2007 - A. J. Foyt Opening Day & Rookie Orientation Program ===
- Weather: Sunny, 73 °F (23 °C)
- Practice summary: The first day of practice opened with a ceremonial lap celebrating A. J. Foyt's fiftieth year of participation at Indianapolis. Practice focused on the rookie tests of Milka Duno and Phil Giebler, as well as refresher tests by five veterans. Duno completed all four phases of her rookie test, and Giebler completed two. Michael Andretti posted the fastest speed of the day, while popular Davey Hamilton made his return to the cockpit, after a devastating 2001 crash at Texas. No incidents were reported.

May 6, 2007 - Top Practice Speeds
Rank	Car No.	Driver	Team	Best Speed
1	39	(United States) Michael Andretti	Andretti Green	219.871
2	12	(Australia) Ryan Briscoe	Luczo-Dragon Racing	218.216
3	02	(United States) Davey Hamilton	Vision Racing	218.022
4	21	(United States) Jaques Lazier	Playa Del Racing	216.467
5	23	(Venezuela) Milka Duno R	SAMAX Motorsports	214.128

=== Monday May 7, 2007 - Rookie Orientation Program ===
- Weather: Sunny, 76 °F (24 °C)
- Practice summary: The second day of Rookie Orientation saw the same seven drivers from the previous day's practice without incident. Rookie Phil Giebler finished the final two phases of his rookie test. Rookie Milka Duno completed the most practice laps of the day (74), while Michael Andretti posted the fastest speed for the second day in a row.

May 7, 2007 - Top Practice Speeds
Rank	Car No.	Driver	Team	Best Speed
1	39	(United States) Michael Andretti	Andretti Green	221.579
2	12	(Australia) Ryan Briscoe	Luczo-Dragon Racing	221.427
3	02	(United States) Davey Hamilton	Vision Racing	220.214
4	21	(United States) Phil Giebler R	Playa Del Racing	217.091
5	19	(United States) Jon Herb	Racing Professionals	216.763

=== Tuesday May 8, 2007 - IndyCar Series practice ===
- Weather: Sunny, 82 °F (28 °C)
- Practice summary: The first full day of practice featured veterans on the track for the first time. Dan Wheldon led the speed chart as the first driver over 225 mph (362 km/h). Jon Herb was involved in the first crash of the month, doing a half-spin at the exit of turn two and crashing into the outside wall. Herb was not injured.

May 8, 2007 - Top Practice Speeds
Rank	Car No.	Driver	Team	Best Speed
1	10	(United Kingdom) Dan Wheldon	Target Chip Ganassi	225.074
2	3	(Brazil) Hélio Castroneves	Team Penske	224.996
3	2	(South Africa) Tomas Scheckter	Vision Racing	224.783
4	11	(Brazil) Tony Kanaan	Andretti Green	224.622
5	9	(New Zealand) Scott Dixon	Target Chip Ganassi	224.564

=== Wednesday May 9, 2007 - IndyCar Series practice ===
- Weather: Morning rain, afternoon clouds, 78 °F (26 °C)
- Practice summary: Rain in the morning and early afternoon delayed the start of practice until 4:00 p.m. The two-hours session saw heavy action, with Dan Wheldon leading the speed chart for the second day in a row. No incidents were reported.

May 9, 2007 - Top Practice Speeds
Rank	Car No.	Driver	Team	Best Speed
1	10	(United Kingdom) Dan Wheldon	Target Chip Ganassi	226.391
2	3	(Brazil) Hélio Castroneves	Team Penske	225.820
3	9	(New Zealand) Scott Dixon	Target Chip Ganassi	224.902
4	26	(United States) Marco Andretti	Andretti Green	224.745
5	11	(Brazil) Tony Kanaan	Andretti Green	224.112

=== Thursday May 10, 2007 - IndyCar Series practice ===
- Weather: Partly cloudy, 86 °F (30 °C)
- Practice summary: The warmest day of the week thus far saw some of the fastest laps turned so far for the month. Scott Dixon set fast lap with two minutes remaining in the session. Danica Patrick was second fastest for the day. No incidents were reported

May 10, 2007 - Top Practice Speeds
Rank	Car No.	Driver	Team	Best Speed
1	9	(New Zealand) Scott Dixon	Target Chip Ganassi	226.473
2	7	(United States) Danica Patrick	Andretti Green	226.358
3	10	(United Kingdom) Dan Wheldon	Target Chip Ganassi	224.902
4	2	(South Africa) Tomas Scheckter	Vision Racing	226.161
5	12	(Australia) Ryan Briscoe	Luczo-Dragon Racing	225.995

=== Friday May 11, 2007 - "Fast" Friday IndyCar Series practice ===
- Weather: Partly cloudy, 85 °F (29 °C)
- Practice summary: The final day of practice before pole qualifying saw Scott Dixon turn the fastest lap of the month. Rookie Milka Duno crashed in the exit of turn 1. She spun and hit the SAFER barrier hard with the rear of the car, but she was not injured.

May 11, 2007 - Top Practice Speeds
Rank	Car No.	Driver	Team	Best Speed
1	9	(New Zealand) Scott Dixon	Target Chip Ganassi	227.167
2	10	(United Kingdom) Dan Wheldon	Target Chip Ganassi	226.650
3	11	(Brazil) Tony Kanaan	Andretti Green	226.236
4	26	(United States) Marco Andretti	Andretti Green	226.230
5	27	(United Kingdom) Dario Franchitti	Andretti Green	226.189

== Qualifying (first weekend) ==
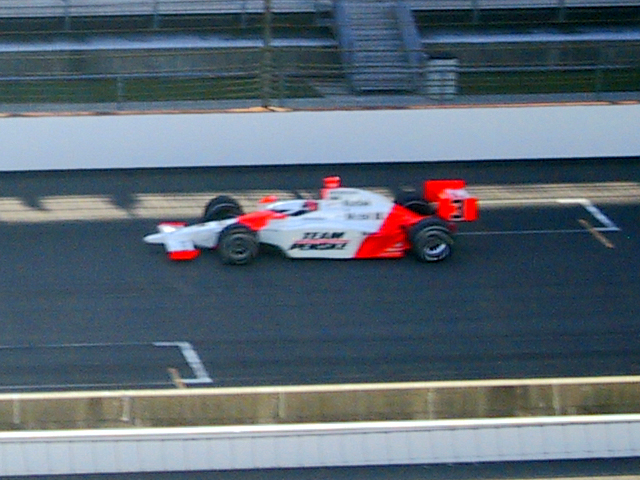
Hélio Castroneves makes his pole-winning qualification run.

=== Saturday May 12, 2007 - AAMCO Pole Day ===
- Weather: Sunny, high 82 °F (28 °C)
- Qualifying summary: Pole day time trials were held under a new qualifying procedure, implemented in 2005, but not fully utilized in 2005 or 2006 due to rain delays. Only the top 11 cars would qualify on pole day, and the remaining would be "bumped" out. Each qualifying run consisted of four laps, and each car was allowed three attempts per day. Buddy Rice was the first out to qualify, but his speed ultimately did not make the top 11. During the first trip through the qualifying order, Team Penske pulled both Hélio Castroneves and Sam Hornish Jr. out of line, and decided to attempt to qualify later in the day, when the temperatures would be cooler. After the initial qualifying runs, Dario Franchitti qualified for the provisional pole position. Later in the afternoon, both Castroneves and Hornish completed qualifying runs, but neither were unable to knock Franchitti off the pole. Hornish's first attempt would have been fast enough to take the pole, but he nearly hit the outside wall in the southchute on his second lap. Even with this error, however, Hornish's run was only 0.0327 seconds slower than Franchitti's. Almost immediately, Hornish withdrew and tried a second attempt, and again nearly took the pole, but on his final lap, his car bobbled in the north chute, and his second attempt was slower than his first. This would cost him a spot on the starting grid when Scott Dixon later withdrew his qualifying run and made another attempt, this one faster than Hornish's second attempt. With eight minutes left in qualifying, Castroneves' car was withdrawn, and he made a second attempt. After nearly four hours, Franchitti was finally knocked off the pole position. With only three minutes left, Tony Kanaan withdrew his first attempt, made the final qualifying run of the day. While his first three laps were fast enough to take the pole away from Castroneves, his last lap fell short and qualified second. This was Hélio Castroneves' second Indy 500 pole position. He also won the pole in 2003.

May 12, 2007 - Pole Day Qualifying Results
Rank	Car No.	Driver	Team	Qual. Speed
1	3	(Brazil) Hélio Castroneves	Team Penske	225.817
2	11	(Brazil) Tony Kanaan	Andretti Green	225.757
3	27	(United Kingdom) Dario Franchitti	Andretti Green	225.191
4	9	(New Zealand) Scott Dixon	Target Chip Ganassi	225.122
5	6	(United States) Sam Hornish Jr.	Team Penske	225.109
6	10	(United Kingdom) Dan Wheldon	Target Chip Ganassi	224.641
7	12	(Australia) Ryan Briscoe	Luczo-Dragon Racing	224.410
8	7	(United States) Danica Patrick	Andretti Green	224.076
9	26	(United States) Marco Andretti	Andretti Green	223.299
10	2	(South Africa) Tomas Scheckter	Vision Racing	222.877
11	39	(United States) Michael Andretti	Andretti Green	222.789

May 12, 2007 - Top Practice Speeds
Rank	Car No.	Driver	Team	Best Speed
1	11	(Brazil) Tony Kanaan	Andretti Green	226.827
2	7	(United States) Danica Patrick	Andretti Green	226.058
3	9	(New Zealand) Scott Dixon	Target Chip Ganassi	225.968
4	3	(Brazil) Hélio Castroneves	Team Penske	225.920
5	10	(United Kingdom) Dan Wheldon	Target Chip Ganassi	225.917

=== Sunday May 13, 2007 - Second Day Qualifying ===
- Weather: Fair skies, high 74 °F (23 °C)
- Qualifying summary: The second day of time trials filled positions 12–22 on the starting grid. The first hour saw heavy action, featuring strong runs from IndyCar Series regulars such as Scott Sharp (the first to qualify, and his 223.875 speed would hold up as the fastest of the day), Jeff Simmons and Darren Manning. Fan favorite Davey Hamilton also qualified with a solid speed. Later in the afternoon, Sarah Fisher became the second woman to qualify for the field. Bumping began with Marty Roth, Buddy Lazier and Jon Herb all being bumped. Herb went out later, and bumped himself back into the field, only to be bumped out a second time by Lazier. As time was running out, Jaques Lazier took to the track to try to bump himself into the top 22, and effectively bump his brother Buddy out. He was too slow and waved off the run. At the end of the day, two-time Indy 500 winner Al Unser Jr. was the most notable driver bumped for the day, and had to attempt to qualify on the second weekend.

May 13, 2007 - Second Day Qualifying Results
Rank	Car No.	Driver	Team	Qual. Speed
12	8	(United States) Scott Sharp	Rahal Letterman	223.875
13	17	(United States) Jeff Simmons	Rahal Letterman	223.693
14	20	(United States) Ed Carpenter	Vision Racing	223.495
15	14	(United Kingdom) Darren Manning	A. J. Foyt Racing	223.471
16	15	(United States) Buddy Rice	Dreyer & Reinbold	222.820
17	55	(Japan) Kosuke Matsuura	Panther Racing	222.595
18	22	(United States) A. J. Foyt IV	Vision Racing	222.413
19	4	(Brazil) Vítor Meira	Panther Racing	222.333
20	02	(United States) Davey Hamilton	Vision Racing	222.327
21	5	(United States) Sarah Fisher	Dreyer & Reinbold	221.960
22	99	(United States) Buddy Lazier	Sam Schmidt Motorsports	221.380

May 13, 2007 - Top Practice Speeds
Rank	Car No.	Driver	Team	Best Speed
1	8	(United States) Scott Sharp	Rahal Letterman	224.214
2	20	(United States) Ed Carpenter	Vision Racing	224.106
3	17	(United States) Jeff Simmons	Rahal Letterman	223.894
4	14	(United Kingdom) Darren Manning	A. J. Foyt Racing	223.603
5	4	(Brazil) Vítor Meira	Panther Racing	223.095

== Practice (week 2) ==
=== Wednesday May 16, 2007 - IndyCar Series practice ===
- Weather: Mostly cloudy early, clearing late, high 62 °F (17 °C), 18 mph (29 km/h) WNW winds
- Practice summary: The first day of practice for second-week deals. Only incident was a spin of Jimmy Kite's car when the gearbox casing of his PDM Racing Panoz cracked in turn 2, causing the left-rear suspension to fail. The car made moderate wall contact with the left-front corner and Kite was cleared to drive. Several teams that qualified during the first weekend tested race set ups and ran in packs, including Danica Patrick who set the fastest lap of the day. Jaques Lazier (217.159 mph (349.484 km/h)) had the fastest lap among drivers who are not yet in the field.

May 16, 2007 - Top Practice Speeds
Rank	Car No.	Driver	Team	Best Speed
1	7	(United States) Danica Patrick	Andretti Green	221.189
2	9	(New Zealand) Scott Dixon	Target Chip Ganassi	220.556
3	6	(United States) Sam Hornish Jr.	Team Penske	220.484
4	26	(United States) Marco Andretti	Andretti Green	220.399
5	27	(United Kingdom) Dario Franchitti	Andretti Green	220.131

=== Thursday May 17, 2007 - IndyCar Series practice ===
- Weather: Mostly cloudy early, clearing late, high 65 °F (18 °C), 16 mph (26 km/h) North winds
- Practice summary: The second straight day of cold and windy weather resulted in fewer than 800 total laps being turned among 23 drivers. The only incident of the day resulted when Stephan Gregoire lost control on the exit of turn 1 and backed the car into the wall in the south short chute. Only light damage was sustained to the car, but Gregoire complained of back pain and was transported to Methodist Hospital where he was diagnosed with a fracture of the third vertebra endplate and was ruled out for the rest of the month. John Andretti made his first appearance in an IndyCar since 1994 and completed his refresher test. Scott Dixon turned the fastest lap of the day while drafting with teammate Dan Wheldon. Gregoire (217.851 mph (350.597 km/h)) turned the fastest lap among drivers yet to qualify before his encounter with the wall.

May 17, 2007 - Top Practice Speeds
Rank	Car No.	Driver	Team	Best Speed
1	9	(New Zealand) Scott Dixon	Target Chip Ganassi	219.985
2	10	(United Kingdom) Dan Wheldon	Target Chip Ganassi	219.773
3	14	(United Kingdom) Darren Manning	A. J. Foyt Racing	219.116
4	2	(South Africa) Tomas Scheckter	Vision Racing	218.230
5	20	(United States) Ed Carpenter	Vision Racing	217.995

=== Friday May 18, 2007 - IndyCar Series practice ===
- Weather: Sunny, high 65 °F (18 °C)
- Practice summary: The final full day of practice went incident free as 31 cars took to the track. All the front runners were running in packs, learning how their cars performed in "dirty air." Sam Hornish Jr. turned the fastest lap of the day during such a session. The non-qualified cars of John Andretti and Roger Yasukawa both turned laps over 222 mph (357 km/h) without drafting assistance as their teams trimmed their cars out to prepare for qualifying. Friday marked the last day of full practice; however, all cars were permitted to practice on Saturday and Sunday during down periods when no cars were presenting to qualify.

May 18, 2007 - Top Practice Speeds
Rank	Car No.	Driver	Team	Best Speed
1	6	(United States) Sam Hornish Jr.	Team Penske	225.006
2	9	(New Zealand) Scott Dixon	Target Chip Ganassi	224.458
3	11	(Brazil) Tony Kanaan	Andretti Green	224.340
4	27	(United Kingdom) Dario Franchitti	Andretti Green	224.253
5	26	(United States) Marco Andretti	Andretti Green	223.668

== Qualifying (second weekend) ==
=== Saturday May 19, 2007 - Third Day Qualifying ===
- Weather: 72 °F (22 °C), sunny and fair skies
- Qualifying summary: The third day of time trials focused on positions 23–33. Rookie Milka Duno was the first car to make an attempt, and she became the third female (along with Danica Patrick and Sarah Fisher) to qualify for the same race, an Indy 500 record, becoming the fifth female in Indy 500 history to start the race. Veterans Al Unser Jr. and John Andretti qualified solidly, while second-week drivers Roger Yasukawa and Alex Barron also completed runs. In the final hour, Jon Herb finally made the field, after being bumped the weekend before, but rookie Phil Giebler crashed on his fourth and final lap. Veteran Roberto Moreno, just named to replace Gregoire on Friday, along with Jimmy Kite, wrapped up the qualifying for the day. At the end of the day, the field stood with 32 qualified cars, one short of a full field. During the morning and afternoon, 32 cars made practice runs, most in preparations for race day. Since only 10 of the 11 allotted positions were filled, no bumping occurred Saturday.

May 19, 2007 - Third Day Qualifying Results
Rank	Car No.	Driver	Team	Qual. Speed
23	24	(United States) Roger Yasukawa	Dreyer & Reinbold Racing	222.654
24	33	(United States) John Andretti	Panther Racing	221.756
25	50	(United States) Al Unser Jr.	A. J. Foyt Racing	220.876
26	98	(United States) Alex Barron	CURB/Agajanian/Beck Motorsports	220.471
27	19	(United States) Jon Herb	Racing Professionals	220.108
28	21	(United States) Jaques Lazier	Playa Del Racing	219.409
29	23	(Venezuela) Milka Duno	SAMAX Motorsports	219.228
30	25	(Canada) Marty Roth	Roth Racing	218.922
31^{†}	77	(Brazil) Roberto Moreno	Chastain Motorsports	216.229
32^{††}	18	(United States) Jimmy Kite	PDM Racing	214.528

^{†}Qualification withdrawn on bump day.

^{††}Bumped on bump day.

May 19, 2007 - Top Practice Speeds
Rank	Car No.	Driver	Team	Best Speed
1	10	(United Kingdom) Dan Wheldon	Target Chip Ganassi	224.895
2	3	(Brazil) Hélio Castroneves	Team Penske	224.692
3	11	(Brazil) Tony Kanaan	Andretti Green	224.593
4	9	(New Zealand) Scott Dixon	Target Chip Ganassi	223.692
5	39	(United States) Michael Andretti	Andretti Green	223.417

=== Sunday May 20, 2007 - Bump Day Qualifying ===
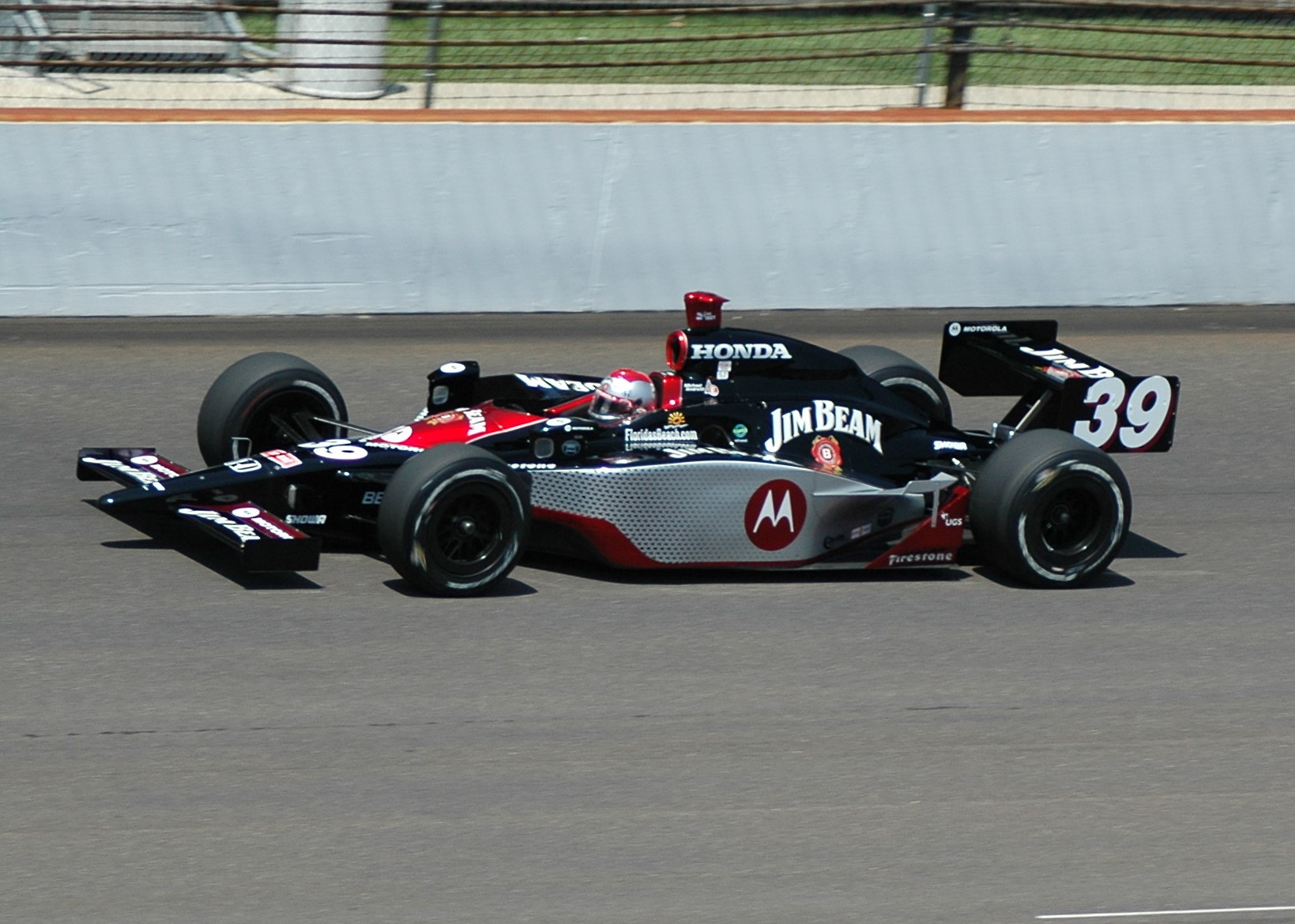
Michael Andretti practicing for the 2007 Indianapolis 500 on May 20

- Weather: Sunny and warm
- Qualifying summary: The field filled to 33 cars just before 3 p.m. as Richie Hearn completed a qualifying attempt. Phil Giebler recovered from his crash the previous day and was able to put his car solidly in the field, bumping Jimmy Kite. Roberto Moreno withdrew his time from the previous day and improved his average by about 4 mph (6.4 km/h), putting Marty Roth on the bubble. P. J. Jones and Jimmy Kite spent the afternoon trying to get their cars up to speed. In the final hour, both Jones and Kite were running out of miles on their Honda engines leases, and neither had made much progress. Ultimately, Jones gave up. Meanwhile, Kite decided to go out and make last ditch qualifying effort, but his speed was not nearly fast enough to bump Roth. The 6 p.m. gun sounded, and Roth held on to qualify for his third Indy 500.

May 20, 2007 - Bump Day Qualifying Results
Rank	Car No.	Driver	Team	Qual. Speed
31	77	(Brazil) Roberto Moreno	Chastain Motorsports	220.299
32	91	(United States) Richie Hearn	Hemelgarn Racing/Racing Professionals	219.860
33	31	(United States) Phil Giebler	Playa Del Racing	219.637

May 20, 2007 - Top Practice Speeds
Rank	Car No.	Driver	Team	Best Speed
1	10	(United Kingdom) Dan Wheldon	Target Chip Ganassi	222.797
2	9	(New Zealand) Scott Dixon	Target Chip Ganassi	222.779
3	27	(United Kingdom) Dario Franchitti	Andretti Green	222.699
4	11	(Brazil) Tony Kanaan	Andretti Green	222.632
5	26	(United States) Marco Andretti	Andretti Green	222.144

== Carb Day ==
=== Friday May 25, 2007 - IndyCar Series final practice ===
- Weather: cloudy, humid, 82 °F (28 °C)
- Practice summary: All 33 qualified cars took to the track and turned in a complete hour-long final practice without incident. Later that day at 3:30 the Miller Lite Concert started with headline act Kid Rock.

May 25, 2007 - Top Practice Speeds
Rank	Car No.	Driver	Team	Best Speed
1	11	(Brazil) Tony Kanaan	Andretti Green	225.467
2	27	(United Kingdom) Dario Franchitti	Andretti Green	223.807
3	39	(United States) Michael Andretti	Andretti Green	223.575
4	3	(Brazil) Hélio Castroneves	Team Penske	223.527
5	21	(United States) Jaques Lazier	Playa Del Racing	223.468

=== Pit Stop Challenge ===
Team Penske won the 31st annual Checkers/Rally's Pit Stop Challenge, their record tenth overall victory in the event. The teams of Hélio Castroneves and Sam Hornish Jr. (both Penske entries) met in the finals with Castroneves and his chief mechanic Rick Rinaman winning the $100,000 first prize after an 8.335-second pit stop.

Quarterfinals
Scott Sharp (Rahal Letterman)	8.466
Scott Dixon (Chip Ganassi Racing)	11.650
Vítor Meira (Panther Racing)	10.095
Dario Franchitti (Andretti Green Racing)	11.773

Semifinals
Hélio Castroneves (Team Penske)	7.6770
Scott Sharp (Rahal Letterman)	stalled
Sam Hornish Jr. (Team Penske)	8.4471
Vítor Meira (Panther Racing)	11.7395

Final
Hélio Castroneves (Team Penske)	8.335
Sam Hornish Jr. (Team Penske)	8.888

== Qualifying chronology ==
Pole Day - Saturday, May 12, 2007
Attempt	Time	Day	Car No.	Driver	Laps	Total Time	Speed (mph)	Result	Position	Rank
1	12:03	1	15	(United States) Buddy Rice	4	2:42.3336	221.766	Qualified; bumped by Michael Andretti	—	—
2	12:08	1	9	(New Zealand) Scott Dixon	4	2:40.4630	224.351	Qualified; withdrawn	—	—
3	12:12	1	12	(Australia) Ryan Briscoe	4	2:40.4208	224.410	Qualified	7	7
4	12:18	1	8	(United States) Scott Sharp	4	2:41.7994	222.498	Qualified; bumped by Marco Andretti	—	—
5	12:21	1	10	(United Kingdom) Dan Wheldon	4	2:40.9401	223.686	Qualified; withdrawn	—	—
6	12:27	1	20	(United States) Ed Carpenter	4	2:41.6630	222.685	Qualified; bumped by Castroneves	—	—
7	12:31	1	22	(United States) A. J. Foyt IV	4	2:42.5527	221.467	Qualified; bumped by Scheckter	—	—
8	12:36	1	55	(Japan) Kosuke Matsuura	4	2:42.2603	221.866	Qualified; bumped by Simmons	—	—
9	12:40	1	7	(United States) Danica Patrick	4	2:40.6596	224.076	Qualified	8	8
10	12:45	1	4	(Brazil) Vítor Meira	2	1:21.4705	220.939	Waved off	—	—
11	12:48	1	11	(Brazil) Tony Kanaan	4	2:40.2719	224.618	Qualified; withdrawn	—	—
12	12:53	1	27	(United Kingdom) Dario Franchitti	4	2:39.8642	225.191	Qualified	3	3
13	12:58	1	2	(South Africa) Tomas Scheckter	4	2:41.5238	222.877	Qualified, bumping Foyt IV	10	14
14	1:03	1	39	(United States) Michael Andretti	4	2:41.5880	222.789	Qualified, bumping Rice	11	16
15	1:07	1	17	(United States) Jeff Simmons	4	2:41.6617	222.687	Qualified, bumping Matsuura; bumped by Hornish	—	—
16	1:11	1	26	(United States) Marco Andretti	4	2:41.2186	223.299	Qualified, bumping Sharp	9	13
17	4:12	1	3	(Brazil) Hélio Castroneves	4	2:40.0088	224.988	Qualified, bumping Carpenter; withdrawn	—	—
18	4:36	1	6	(United States) Sam Hornish Jr.	4	2:39.8969	225.145	Qualified, bumping Simmons; withdrawn	—	—
19	4:51	1	6	(United States) Sam Hornish Jr.	4	2:39.9227	225.109	Qualified	5	5
20	5:23	1	9	(New Zealand) Scott Dixon	4	2:39.9136	225.122	Qualified	4	4
21	5:28	1	8	(United States) Scott Sharp	4	2:41.6209	222.743	Failed to qualify	—	—
22	5:33	1	17	(United States) Jeff Simmons	4	2:41.8433	222.437	Failed to qualify	—	—
23	5:38	1	10	(United Kingdom) Dan Wheldon	4	2:40.2557	224.641	Qualified	6	6
24	5:42	1	20	(United States) Ed Carpenter	4	2:41.6871	222.652	Failed to qualify	—	—
25	5:48	1	14	(United Kingdom) Darren Manning	4	2:41.6844	222.656	Failed to qualify	—	—
26	5:52	1	3	(Brazil) Hélio Castroneves	4	2:39.4214	225.817	Qualified	1	1
27	5:57	1	11	(Brazil) Tony Kanaan	4	2:39.4634	225.757	Qualified	2	2

Sunday May 13, 2007
Attempt	Time	Day	Car No.	Driver	Laps	Total Time	Speed (mph)	Result	Position	Rank
28	12:02	2	8	(United States) Scott Sharp	4	2:40.8041	223.875	Qualified	12	9
29	12:07	2	55	(Japan) Kosuke Matsuura	4	2:41.7290	222.595	Qualified	17	18
30	12:11	2	99	(United States) Buddy Lazier	4	2:43.3010	220.452	Qualified; bumped by Rice	—	—
31	12:16	2	17	(United States) Jeff Simmons	4	2:40.9352	223.693	Qualified	13	10
32	12:20	2	25	(Canada) Marty Roth	4	2:43.7193	219.889	Qualified; bumped by Foyt IV	—	—
33	12:25	2	14	(United Kingdom) Darren Manning	4	2:41.0950	223.471	Qualified	15	12
34	12:30	2	50	(United States) Al Unser Jr.	4	2:42.9233	220.963	Qualified; bumped by Herb	—	—
35	12:35	2	19	(United States) Jon Herb	4	2:43.7065	219.906	Qualified; bumped by Fisher	—	—
36	12:39	2	02	(United States) Davey Hamilton	4	2:41.9238	222.327	Qualified	20	21
37	1:09	2	4	(Brazil) Vítor Meira	4	2:41.9196	222.333	Qualified	19	20
38	1:45	2	20	(United States) Ed Carpenter	4	2:41.0777	223.495	Qualified	14	11
39	2:24	2	22	(United States) A. J. Foyt IV	4	2:41.8607	222.413	Qualified, bumping Roth	18	19
40	3:26	2	5	(United States) Sarah Fisher	4	2:42.1914	221.960	Qualified, bumping Herb	21	22
41	3:34	2	15	(United States) Buddy Rice	4	2:41.5612	222.826	Qualified, bumping B. Lazier	16	15
42	5:29	2	19	(United States) Jon Herb	4	2:42.8440	221.070	Qualified, bumping Unser Jr.; bumped by B. Lazier	—	—
43	5:53	2	99	(United States) Buddy Lazier	4	2:42.6165	221.380	Qualified, bumping Herb	22	24
44	5:58	2	21	(United States) Jaques Lazier	1	0:40.8700	220.210	Waved off	—	—

Saturday May 19, 2007
Attempt	Time	Day	Car No.	Driver	Laps	Total Time	Speed (mph)	Result	Position	Rank
45	12:03	3	23	(Venezuela) Milka Duno	4	2:44.2129	219.228	Qualified	29	32
46	12:07	3	24	(United States) Roger Yasukawa	4	2:41.6855	222.654	Qualified	23	17
47	12:12	3	19	(United States) Jon Herb	3	2:02.5974	220.233	Waved off	—	—
48	12:25	3	25	(Canada) Marty Roth	4	2:44.4421	218.922	Qualified	30	33
49	12:59	3	33	(United States) John Andretti	4	2:42.3403	221.756	Qualified	24	23
50	2:20	3	50	(United States) Al Unser Jr.	4	2:42.9871	220.876	Qualified	25	25
51	5:14	3	98	(United States) Alex Barron	4	2:43.2871	220.471	Qualified	26	26
52	5:18	3	21	(United States) Jaques Lazier	4	2:44.0774	219.409	Qualified	28	31
53	5:23	3	19	(United States) Jon Herb	4	2:43.5561	220.108	Qualified	27	28
54	5:27	3	31	(United States) Phil Giebler	3	2:01.9724	221.362	Crashed in turn 2 on 4th lap	—	—
55	5:44	3	77	(Brazil) Roberto Moreno	4	2:46.4902	216.229	Qualified; withdrawn on bump day	—	—
56	5:54	3	18	(United States) Jimmy Kite	4	2:47.8104	214.528	Qualified; bumped by Giebler on bump day	—	—

Bump Day - Sunday May 20, 2007
Attempt	Time	Day	Car No.	Driver	Laps	Total Time	Speed (mph)	Result	Position	Rank
57	2:39	4	91	(United States) Richie Hearn	4	2:43.7408	219.860	Qualified	32	29
58	3:52	4	31	(United States) Phil Giebler	4	2:43.9071	219.637	Qualified, bumping Kite	33	30
59	5:01	4	77	(Brazil) Roberto Moreno	4	2:43.4139	220.299	Qualified	31	27
60	5:57	4	18	(United States) Jimmy Kite	1	0:41.9103	214.744	Waved off	—	—

== Starting grid ==
Row	Inside		Middle		Outside	
1	3	(Brazil) Hélio Castroneves W	11	(Brazil) Tony Kanaan	27	(United Kingdom) Dario Franchitti
2	9	(New Zealand) Scott Dixon	6	(United States) Sam Hornish Jr. W	10	(United Kingdom) Dan Wheldon W
3	12	(Australia) Ryan Briscoe	7	(United States) Danica Patrick	26	(United States) Marco Andretti
4	2	(South Africa) Tomas Scheckter	39	(United States) Michael Andretti	8	(United States) Scott Sharp
5	17	(United States) Jeff Simmons	20	(United States) Ed Carpenter	14	(United Kingdom) Darren Manning
6	15	(United States) Buddy Rice W	55	(Japan) Kosuke Matsuura	22	(United States) A. J. Foyt IV
7	4	(Brazil) Vítor Meira	02	(United States) Davey Hamilton	5	(United States) Sarah Fisher
8	99	(United States) Buddy Lazier W	24	(United States) Roger Yasukawa	33	(United States) John Andretti
9	50	(United States) Al Unser Jr. W	98	(United States) Alex Barron	19	(United States) Jon Herb
10	21	(United States) Jaques Lazier	23	(Venezuela) Milka Duno R	25	(Canada) Marty Roth
11	77	(Brazil) Roberto Moreno	91	(United States) Richie Hearn	31	(United States) Phil Giebler R

W = Former Indianapolis 500 winner; R = Indianapolis 500 rookie

Failed to Qualify

No.	Driver	Team	Reason
18	(United States) Jimmy Kite	PDM Racing	Bumped, too slow
40	(United States) P. J. Jones	Team Leader Motorsports	Too slow
77	(France) Stéphan Grégoire	Chastain Motorsports	Injured in practice crash

== Race summary ==
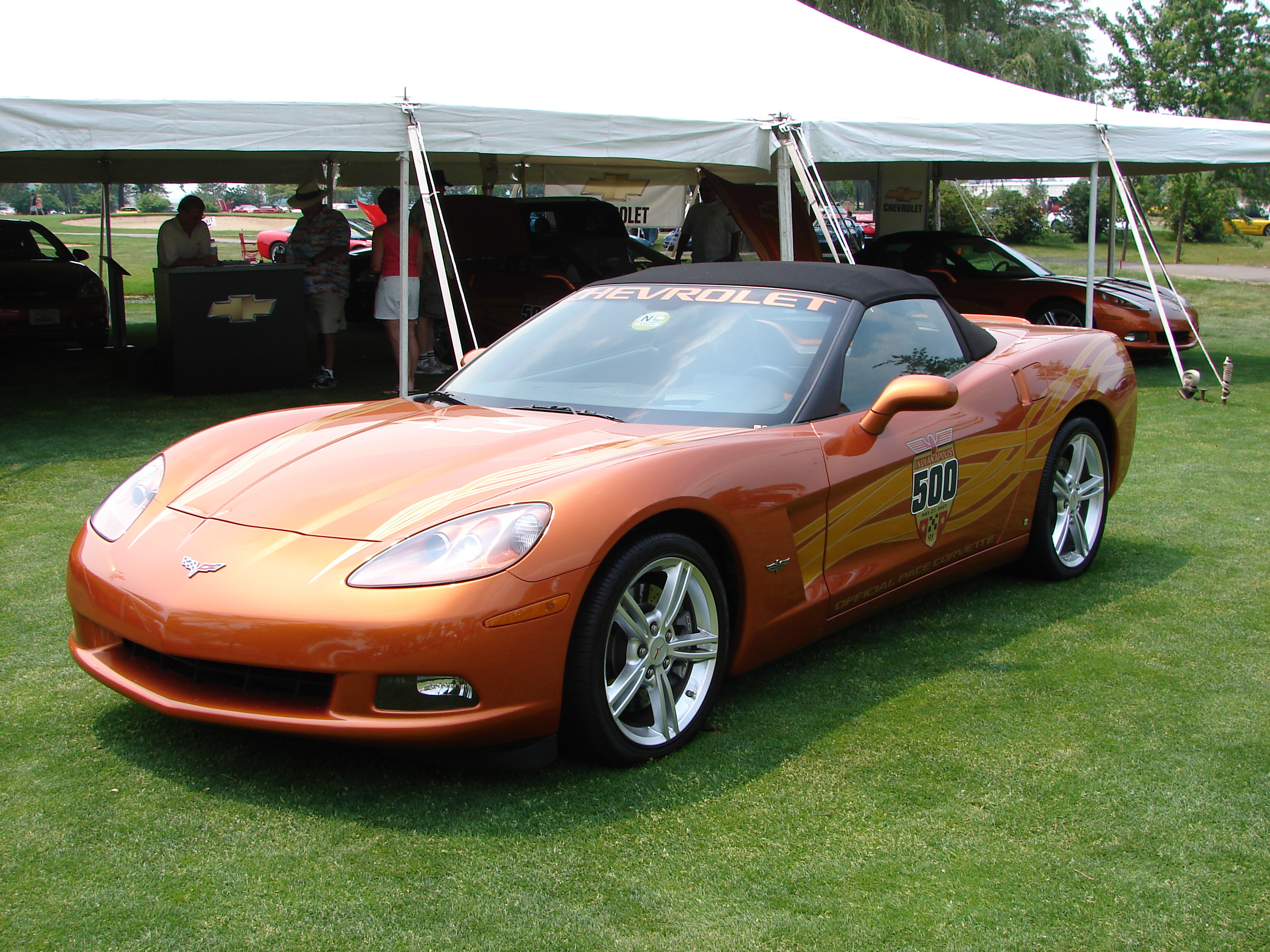
The pace car, a 2007 Chevrolet Camaro

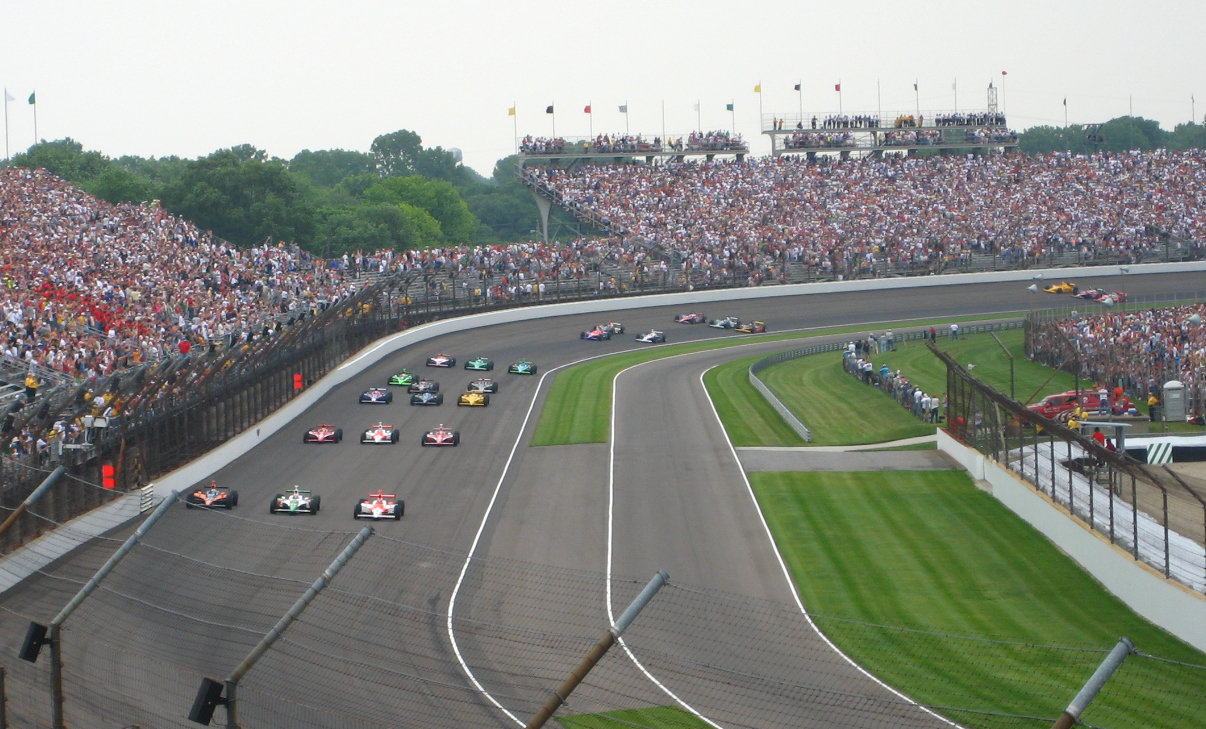
The field in formation entering Turn 4 en route to the green flag

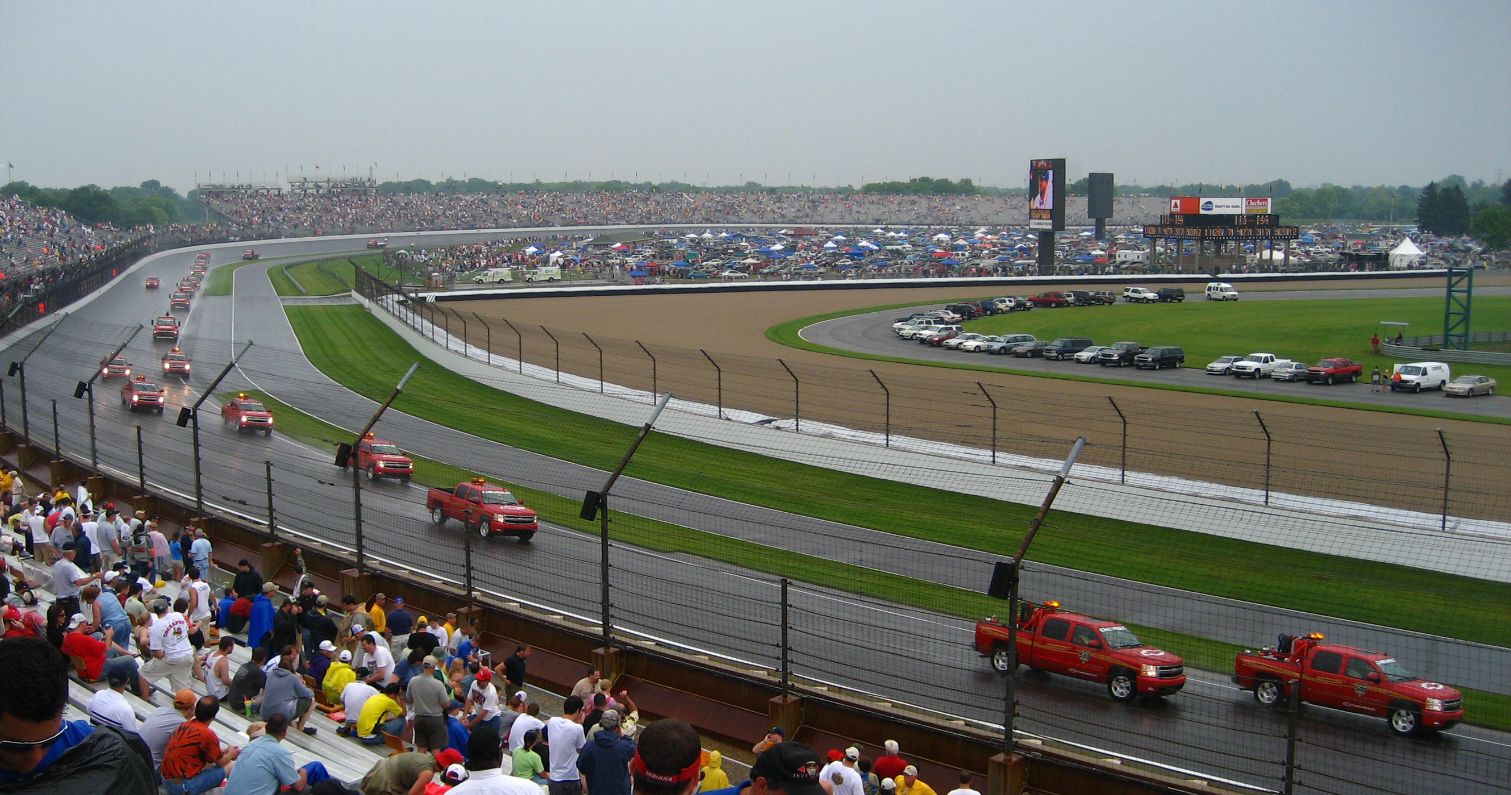
Emergency crews attempting to dry the track during the red flag

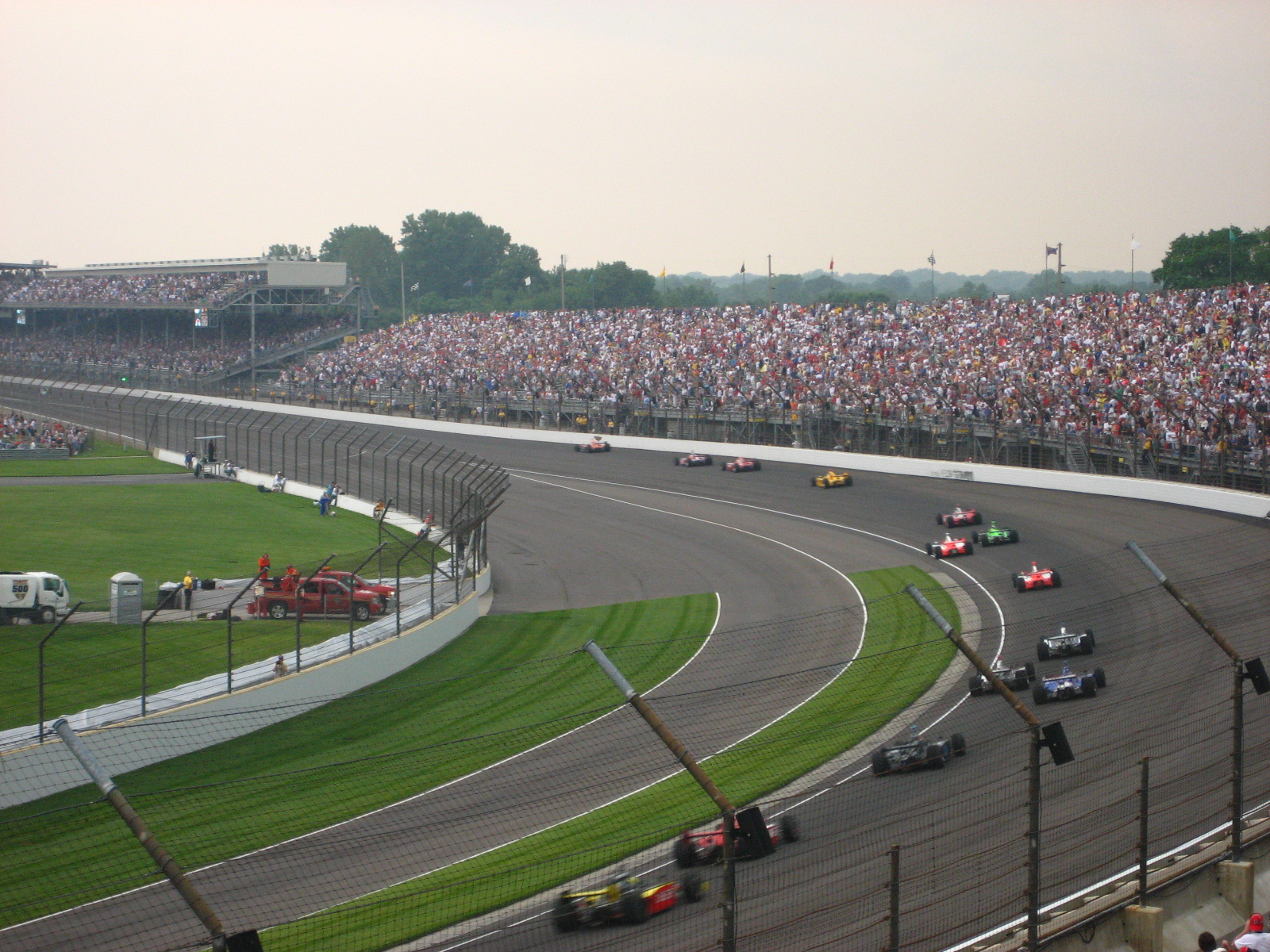
Dario Franchitti leads the field back to the final restart on Lap 162

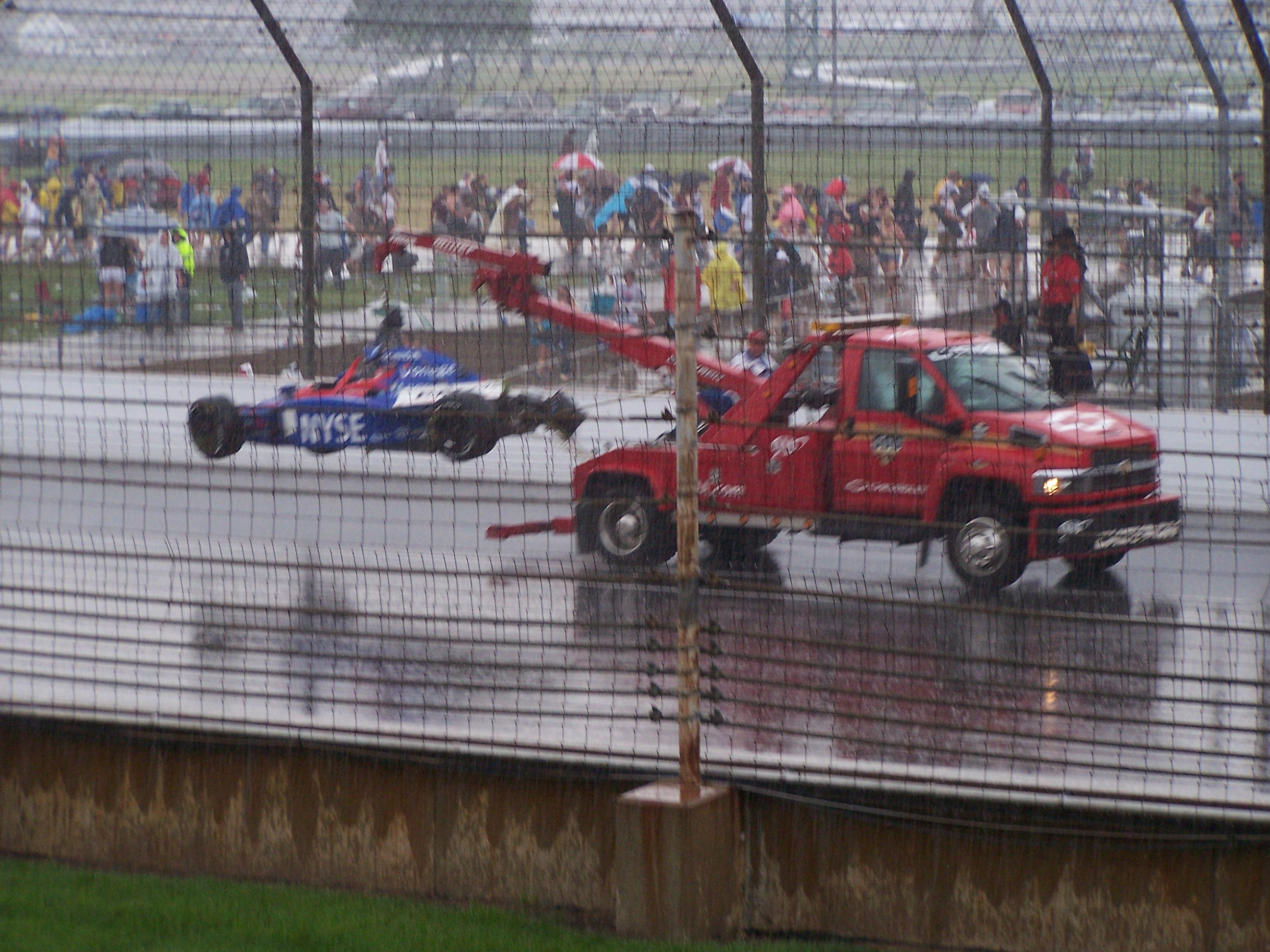
Marco Andretti's beaten car being towed after his wreck

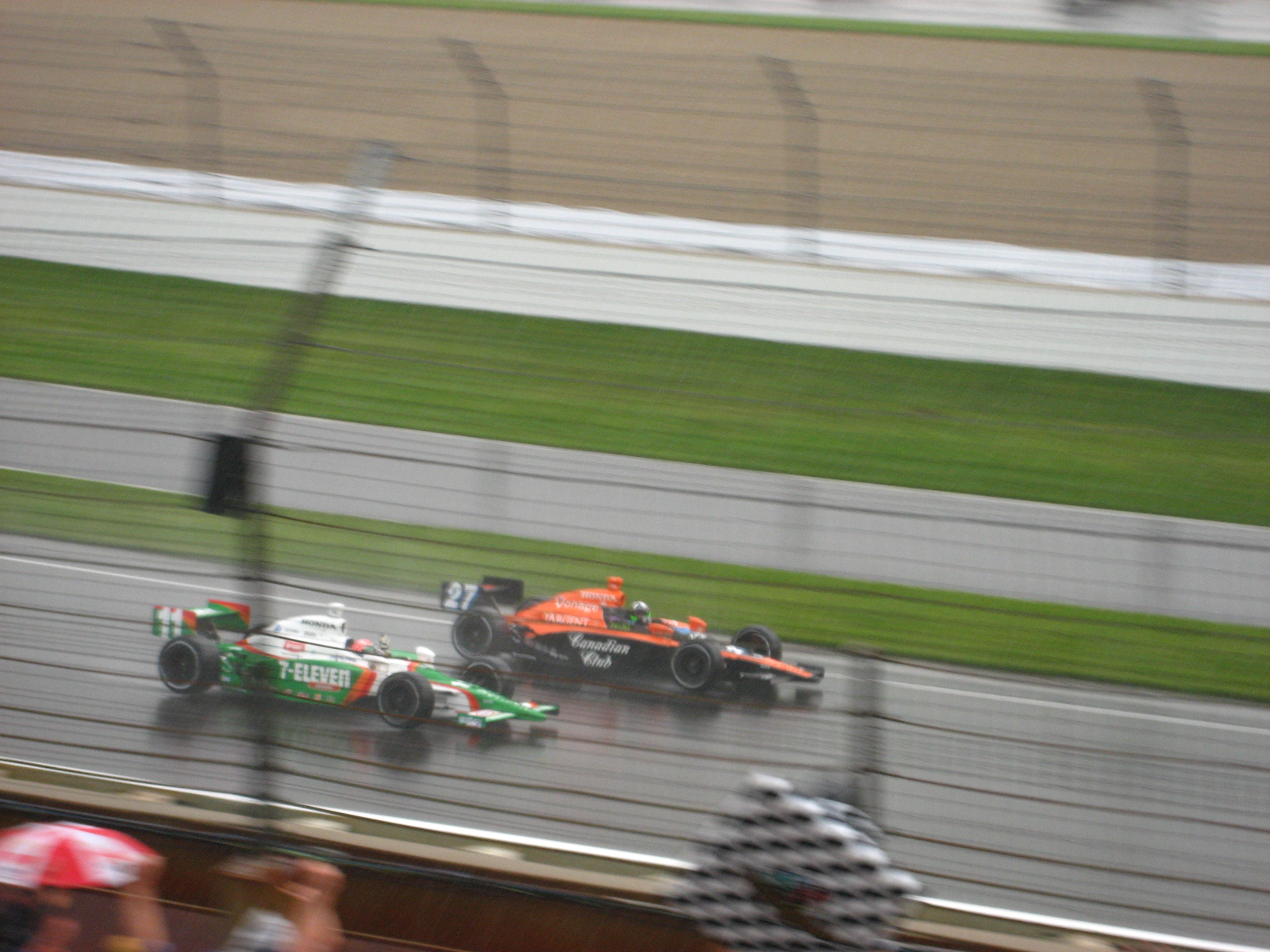
Race winner Dario Franchitti celebrating with teammate Tony Kanaan in the rain

=== Pre-race ===
- Weather: 76 °F (24 °C), cloudy and rain, some patches of sunshine in the afternoon

Rain fell overnight, but stopped before the gates opened in the morning. At 7:45 a.m., rain began to fall again, and threatened to delay or wash out the race. Around 10:00 a.m., the rain stopped and maintenance crews began to dry the track. Despite the morning showers, Speedway chairperson Mari Hulman George gave the command to start engines on time as scheduled at 1:05 p.m. EDT.

=== Start ===
During the pace lap, the race nearly took a dramatic turn as pole-sitter Hélio Castroneves failed to start. After several attempts, his car finally fired, and he joined the field in turn 4. A rather ragged start saw Castroneves take the lead into the first turn, but Tony Kanaan slipped by to lead lap one. Green-flag racing continued until lap 11, when John Andretti lost a rear-view mirror, bringing out a debris caution yellow flag.

When racing resumed, Castroneves, Tony Kanaan, Marco Andretti, and Scott Dixon all took their turn at the lead. Roberto Moreno caused the 2nd caution when he slid high in turn 1, slapped the wall, and hit the wall again in turn 2 before coming to rest. Jon Herb was the next car to be in an accident after he slid in turn 2 and hit the wall, ending his day. Milka Duno also spun in turn 1 and backed her car into the wall, damaging and ending her day as well.

On the 74th lap, Dario Franchitti took the lead for the first time, and led until he pit on the 89th lap. Around that time, officials were warning that rain was approaching the area. After several drivers sequenced through green-flag pit stops, Tony Kanaan led Marco Andretti. Suddenly, on the 99th lap, John Andretti got high in turn two, and crashed into the outside wall, bringing out the caution. Jeff Simmons found himself unexpectedly in the lead, but pitted a lap later, giving Marco Andretti the lead. With rain only a few miles away, the ensuing lap 107 restart could decide the winner. As the green came out, Tony Kanaan got the jump on Andretti, and took the lead in turn 1. Moments later, Phil Giebler spun and crashed in turn 1, bringing the yellow out once again. Before safety crews could clear the track, heavy rain fell, and the race was red flagged.

=== Red flag ===
When the race was stopped, 113 laps were completed. A race is required to go a minimum of 101 laps before it can be official. If rain continued the rest of the afternoon, it could be declared official. Andretti Green Racing was scored 1st-2nd-3rd with Kanaan leading, Marco Andretti second, and Danica Patrick third. After nearly three hours, the rain stopped and the track was dry. Shortly after 6:00 p.m., the field lined up in the pits for a restart.

=== Restart ===
Tony Kanaan took over where he left off and pulled away from the field. Danica Patrick got by Marco Andretti and took over second place. Approximately 30 laps of uninterrupted intense green flag racing followed. Another sequence of green-flag pit stops saw all of the leaders head to the pits. Jaques Lazier stayed out a couple of extra laps, and led the race for the first time in his career. After the stops, Kanaan returned to the lead, followed by defending champion Sam Hornish Jr.

=== Finish ===
On the 151st lap, Marty Roth slid high in turn 1 and smacked the wall, and started an exciting sequence of events. The skies were darkening, and rain was fast approaching again, which would certainly end the race for good. Under the yellow, many leaders pit for tires and fuel, while some drivers, including Dario Franchitti and Scott Dixon, stayed out to gain track position. On the 156th lap, the field went back to green, however, in turn four, Tony Kanaan came up on the back of Jaques Lazier, sending Lazier into the wall, and sending Kanaan's car into a spin. He blew a tire and coasted into the pits. Moments later, the field assembled for what was expected to be the final restart before the rains came. Franchitti, working lap 163, held the lead into the backstretch. Behind him, Marco Andretti tangled with Dan Wheldon, and Andretti's car flipped down the backstretch. Buddy Rice was also involved. Before the track could be cleared, a heavy rainstorm fell on the track, and the race was called after 166 laps with Dario Franchitti declared the winner. As was the case in 2004, victory lane celebrations were cancelled. Franchitti drove his car inside the Master Control Tower ("Pagoda") for victory ceremonies in an indoor setting, which is now established as the standard procedure in inclement weather.

As of the 2026 race, this was the most recent "500" to be shortened by rain.

== Box score ==
Finish	Start	Car No.	Driver	Team	Chassis	Engine	Laps	Status	Points
1	3	27	(United Kingdom) Dario Franchitti	Andretti Green Racing	Dallara	Honda	166	151.774 mph	50
2	4	9	(New Zealand) Scott Dixon	Chip Ganassi Racing	Dallara	Honda	166	+0.3610	40
3	1	3	(Brazil) Hélio Castroneves W	Team Penske	Dallara	Honda	166	+1.8485	35
4	5	6	(United States) Sam Hornish Jr. W	Team Penske	Dallara	Honda	166	+4.6324	32
5	7	12	(Australia) Ryan Briscoe	Luczo-Dragon Racing	Dallara	Honda	166	+5.2109	30
6	12	8	(United States) Scott Sharp	Rahal Letterman Racing	Dallara	Honda	166	+9.3470	28
7	10	2	(South Africa) Tomas Scheckter	Vision Racing	Dallara	Honda	166	+11.3823	26
8	8	7	(United States) Danica Patrick	Andretti Green Racing	Dallara	Honda	166	+12.1789	24
9	20	02	(United States) Davey Hamilton	Vision Racing	Dallara	Honda	166	+15.4116	22
10	19	4	(Brazil) Vítor Meira	Panther Racing	Dallara	Honda	166	+17.6991	20
11	13	17	(United States) Jeff Simmons	Rahal Letterman Racing	Dallara	Honda	166	+19.7119	19
12	2	11	(Brazil) Tony Kanaan	Andretti Green Racing	Dallara	Honda	166	+21.4339	18+3
13	11	39	(United States) Michael Andretti	Andretti Green Racing	Dallara	Honda	166	+35.1235	17
14	18	22	(United States) A. J. Foyt IV	Vision Racing	Dallara	Honda	165	-1 Lap	16
15	26	98	(United States) Alex Barron	CURB/Agajanian/Beck Motorsports	Dallara	Honda	165	-1 Lap	15
16	17	55	(Japan) Kosuke Matsuura	Panther Racing	Dallara	Honda	165	-1 Lap	14
17	14	20	(United States) Ed Carpenter	Vision Racing	Dallara	Honda	164	-1 Lap	13
18	21	5	(United States) Sarah Fisher	Dreyer & Reinbold Racing	Dallara	Honda	164	-2 Laps	12
19	22	99	(United States) Buddy Lazier W	Sam Schmidt Motorsports	Dallara	Honda	164	-2 Laps	12
20	15	14	(United Kingdom) Darren Manning	A. J. Foyt Racing	Dallara	Honda	164	-2 Laps	12
21	23	24	(United States) Roger Yasukawa	Dreyer & Reinbold Racing	Dallara	Honda	164	-2 Laps	12
22	6	10	(United Kingdom) Dan Wheldon W	Chip Ganassi Racing	Dallara	Honda	163	Crash	12
23	32	91	(United States) Richie Hearn	Hemelgarn Racing/Racing Professionals	Dallara	Honda	163	-3 Laps	12
24	9	26	(United States) Marco Andretti	Andretti Green Racing	Dallara	Honda	162	Crash	12
25	16	15	(United States) Buddy Rice W	Dreyer & Reinbold Racing	Dallara	Honda	162	Crash	10
26	25	50	(United States) Al Unser Jr. W	A. J. Foyt Racing	Dallara	Honda	161	-5 Laps	10
27	28	21	(United States) Jaques Lazier	Playa Del Racing	Panoz	Honda	155	Crash	10
28	30	25	(Canada) Marty Roth	Roth Racing	Dallara	Honda	148	Crash	10
29	33	31	(United States) Phil Giebler R	Playa Del Racing	Panoz	Honda	106	Crash	10
30	24	33	(United States) John Andretti	Panther Racing	Dallara	Honda	95	Crash	10
31	29	23	(Venezuela) Milka Duno R	SAMAX Motorsport	Dallara	Honda	65	Crash	10
32	27	19	(United States) Jon Herb	Racing Professionals	Dallara	Honda	51	Crash	10
33	31	77	(Brazil) Roberto Moreno	Chastain Motorsports	Panoz	Honda	36	Crash	10

W Former Indianapolis 500 winner

R Indianapolis 500 Rookie

All entrants utilized Firestone tires.

=== Race statistics ===
Nine drivers led the race, with a total of twenty-three lead changes.

Lap Leaders
Laps	Leader
1–2	Tony Kanaan
3	Hélio Castroneves
4–13	Tony Kanaan
14–17	Hélio Castroneves
18–26	Tony Kanaan
27–40	Hélio Castroneves
41–46	Marco Andretti
47–53	Scott Dixon
54–68	Tony Kanaan
69–71	Scott Dixon
72–73	Sam Hornish Jr.
74–88	Dario Franchitti
89	Scott Dixon
90	Michael Andretti
91–100	Tony Kanaan
101	Jeff Simmons
102–107	Marco Andretti
108–116	Tony Kanaan
117	Marco Andretti
118–136	Tony Kanaan
137–143	Dario Franchitti
144–145	Jaques Lazier
146–154	Tony Kanaan
155–166	Dario Franchitti

Total laps led
Driver	Laps
Tony Kanaan	83
Dario Franchitti	34
Hélio Castroneves	19
Marco Andretti	13
Scott Dixon	11
Sam Hornish Jr.	2
Jaques Lazier	2
Michael Andretti	1
Jeff Simmons	1

Cautions: 11 for 55 laps
Laps	Reason
11–15	Debris; John Andretti lost mirror
38–43	Roberto Moreno crash in turn 1
52–59	Jon Herb crash in turn 2
66–70	Milka Duno crash in turn 1
99–106	John Andretti crash in turn 2
108–111	Phil Giebler crash in turn 1
112–113	Rain (red flag)
114–115	Warm-up laps for restart
151–156	Marty Roth crash in turn 1
157–161	Tony Kanaan, Jaques Lazier crash in turn 4
163–166	Andretti, Wheldon, Rice, Carpenter crash on backstretch; Rain (red flag)

== Awards ==
The Victory Celebration was held Monday May 28, 2007. Some of the many awards handed out during the evening included:

- A record total purse of $10,668,815
- Race winner Dario Franchitti won $1,645,233
- Phil Giebler won the Rookie of the Year
- Tony Kanaan won the Scott Brayton Driver's Trophy

== Broadcasting ==
=== Television ===
The race was broadcast in the United States on ABC for the 43rd consecutive year. Time trials were shown live on ABC, ESPN, and ESPN2. For the first time, the race would be aired in high definition.

This was the final 500 broadcast for Rusty Wallace as he was involved with ESPN on ABC NASCAR broadcasts.

For the second year in a row, the telecast utilized the Side-by-Side format for commercial breaks.

ABC Television
Booth Announcers	Pit/garage reporters
Host: Brent Musburger; Announcer: Marty Reid; Color: Scott Goodyear; Color: Rusty Wallace	Jack Arute; Vince Welch; Brienne Pedigo; Jamie Little

=== Radio ===
The race was broadcast on radio by the IMS Radio Network for the 55th consecutive year. Mike King served as anchor. Davey Hamilton, who previously served as the "driver expert" on the network, returned to cockpit for the first time since 2001. After six years recovery from his serious crash, he offered live in-car reporting to the broadcast during caution periods.

Making a popular return to the IMS Radio Network was former "Voice of the 500" Bob Jenkins. In 2006, Jenkins had worked on the Speedway public address system, but for 2007, he took over the turn two reporting location. Jenkins filled the spot previously held by Adam Alexander, who departed the network.

For the third year in a row, Kevin Olson conducted his annual pre-race interview with David Letterman. Olson served as a pit reporter in the center pits during the early stages of the race, then later moved to cover the garages and track hospital.

Indianapolis Motor Speedway Radio Network
Booth Announcers	Turn Reporters	Pit/garage reporters
Chief Announcer: Mike King; Driver expert: Johnny Parsons; Color: Dave Wilson; Historian: Donald Davidson; Live in-car reports: Davey Hamilton; Commentary: Chris Economaki	Turn 1: Jerry Baker; Turn 2: Bob Jenkins; Turn 3: Mark Jaynes; Turn 4: Chris Denari	Jake Query (north pits); Dave Argabright (center pits); Kevin Lee (south pits); Kevin Olson (garages/hospital)

== See also ==
- Indy Racing League
- 2007 IndyCar Series season

== Notes ==
=== Works cited ===
- 2007 Indianapolis 500 Daily Trackside Report for the Media
- Indianapolis 500 History: Race & All-Time Stats - Official Site

2006 Indianapolis 500; Sam Hornish Jr.	2007 Indianapolis 500; Dario Franchitti	2008 Indianapolis 500; Scott Dixon

Preceded by Kansas Lottery Indy 300	IRL IndyCar Series round 5; 2007	Succeeded by ABC Supply Company A. J. Foyt 225
