= Racing Professionals =

Former racing team

Racing Professionals was a racing team owned by Indy Racing League/IndyCar Series driver Jon Herb. Herb formed the team in the middle of the 2001 season and competed in a total of eight races at the end of that season and the 2002 season. In 2004 the team fielded a car for Herb in three events in the Infiniti Pro Series. In 2005 Herb ran the full IPS season, highlighted by winning the Phoenix race.

The team competed in the 2007 Indianapolis 500 as Herb filed an entry on March 29. The team also fielded a second car in conjunction with Hemelgarn Racing for driver Richie Hearn. Herb also competed in the Texas Motor Speedway and Michigan International Speedway races during the 2007 season. Herb sold the team's chassis to the League for redistribution to former Champ Car teams after 2008's open wheel unification.

== Complete IRL IndyCar Series results ==
(key) (Results in bold indicate pole position; results in italics indicate fastest lap)

Year	Chassis	Engine	Drivers	No.	1	2	3	4	5	6	7	8	9	10	11	12	13	14	15	16	17
2002					HMS	PHX	FON	NAZ	INDY	TXS	PPIR	RIR	KAN	NSH	MCH	KTY	GAT	CHI	TXS		
2002	G-Force GF01C	Chevrolet Indy V8	(United States) Jon Herb	16	DNS	11	19	22	DNQ												
2002	Dallara IR-02	Chevrolet Indy V8	(United States) Jon Herb	16						22	21	19									
2007					HMS	STP	MOT	KAN	INDY	MIL	TXS	IOW	RIR	WGL	NSH	MDO	MCH	KTY	SNM	DET	CHI
2007	Dallara IR-05	Honda HI7R V8	(United States) Jon Herb	19					32		20						20				
2007	Dallara IR-05	Honda HI7R V8	(United States) Richie Hearn	91					23^{1}												

1. In conjunction with Hemelgarn Racing.
