= Matt Young Motorsports =

Professional auto racing organization in Texas

Matt Young Motorsports is a professional auto racing organization based in Bryan, Texas. The organization first launched operations in the Infiniti Pro Series (now Indy Lights) in 2004. Debuting at Indianapolis Motor Speedway in the Freedom 100, 18-year-old team owner Matt Young became the youngest team owner in racing history.

== 2005-2006 ==
The following season, on the heels of a podium finish in the opening round of the 2005 Infiniti Pro Series season at Homestead-Miami Speedway the team would go on to its first professional race victory in the Phoenix 100 at Phoenix International Raceway on March 19. They would leave Phoenix leading the series points standings. The team would never regain its early season form nor would they maintain the top spot in the series points standings after being plagued by a series of engine and mechanical failures for the rest of 2005.

After a slow start to the 2006 Indy Pro Series season that would see the team finish outside of the top 5 in the first 6 races of the year, Matt Young Motorsports shuttered its Indianapolis, IN Indy Pro Series operation.

== 2011-2013 ==
In 2011, after nearly a 5-year hiatus from professional racing, Matt Young Motorsports returned to top-level motorsport, working with soccer player and United States Men's National Team regular Heath Pearce. Competing in Grand-Am Road Racing's Continental Tires Sports Car Challenge, the team campaigned a pair of Porsche 997s in the Grand Sport (GS) class, debuting rookie co-drivers Andy Lee, a professional driving instructor at Bob Bondurant School of High Performance Driving, and BestIT CEO Harry Curtin in the race at Barber Motorsports Park.

In 2012 Matt Young Motorsports moved to the Pirelli World Challenge Championship competing in the Touring Car (TC) class and campaigning two Mazda RX-8's. The team's two cars finished in the top 10 in every race entered that season, with the exception of a single mechanical DNF for J.D. Mobley in race 3 at Miller Motorsports Park. Between its two entries, Matt Young Motorsports collected four top 5s in six races.

In 2013 the team launched an effort to market and support Camp Quality USA, a nonprofit organization that serves pediatric cancer patients and their families by providing year-round programs, experiences, and companionship at no cost, along with a week at one of 15 summer camps across 12 states for its more than 900 participants. Matt Young Motorsports initially decided to continue its relationship with Mazda and returned to Pirelli World Challenge with the intent to campaign Mazda MX-5s in the Touring Car class. But after significant mechanical gremlins cost the team a chance to compete in all 3 rounds of the season's opening race weekend at Circuit of the Americas, the team abandoned the new MX-5 project. The team would, however, run the entire season in the Touring Car B-Spec (TCB) class with its two Honda Fit racecars. With lead driver Joel Lipperini behind the wheel of its #81 entry, the team took 6 podiums in 14 races, scoring back-to-back wins mid-season at Lime Rock Park race 3 and Toronto race 1. After two second-place finishes in the two season ending rounds at the Grand Prix of Houston Lipperini and the team just missed out on the TCB class championship, settling for a runner-up finish in the points.

== 2016-present ==
The team has announced its return to Pirelli World Challenge Touring Car competition for the full 2016 season, running Canadian Nick Wittmer in the Honda Ste-Rose Honda Accord V6. The team started the season with a Pole for the Nissan Grand Prix of Texas Presented by VP Racing Fuels TC Round 1. After leading from pole in the early stages of the race, the #91 Touring Car's engine blew and Wittmers day was done. The team made an overnight motor change in order to make the grid for Round 2, Nick Wittmer started 4th and finished 2nd in the Honda Accord V6 Touring Car. At CTMP the team scored a double podium weekend after winning Round 3, and finishing a close second to Toby Grahovic in Round 4. Wittmer grabbed his second win and 4th podium of the season at Lime Rock Race 1, but had a mechanical issue and had to settle for a 7th-place finish in Round 6. The team finished the season with a string of top 4 finishes and ended up second in the team points, with Nick Wittmer taking third in the drivers standings.

== Pirelli World Challenge ==
| Year | Car # | Driver | Sponsor | Make/Model | Class | 1 | 2 | 3 | 4 | 5 | 6 | 7 | 8 | 9 | 10 | 11 | 12 | 13 | 14 | Driver Rank | Driver Points | Team Rank | Team Points |
|---|---|---|---|---|---|---|---|---|---|---|---|---|---|---|---|---|---|---|---|---|---|---|---|
| 2012 | 97 | (United States) J D Mobley | Global Barter Corporation/iTraycer/MYM | Mazda RX-8 | TC | (United States); STP1 | (United States); STP2 | (United States); MMP1; 5 | (United States); MMP2; 4 | (United States); MMP3; 12 | (United States); LAG | (Canada); CTMP1 | (Canada); CTMP2 | (Canada); CTMP3 | (United States); MidO1 | (United States); MidO2 | (United States); SNM1 | (United States); SNM2 | (United States); SNM3 | - | - | - | - |
| 2012 | 98 | (United States) Tommy Boileau | Global Barter Corporation/iTraycer/MYM | Mazda RX-8 | TC | (United States); STP1 | (United States); STP2 | (United States); MMP1; 8 | (United States); MMP2; 8 | (United States); MMP3; 8 | (United States); LAG | (Canada); CTMP1 | (Canada); CTMP2 | (Canada); CTMP3 | (United States); MidO1 | (United States); MidO2 | (United States); SNM1 | (United States); SNM2 | (United States); SNM3 | - | - | - | - |
| 2012 | 97 | (Canada) Marlin Langeveldt | GoopyPerf/iTraycer/MYM | Mazda RX-8 | TC | (United States); STP1 | (United States); STP2 | (United States); MMP1 | (United States); MMP2 | (United States); MMP3 | (United States); LAG | (Canada); CTMP1; 10 | (Canada); CTMP2; 4 | (Canada); CTMP3; 7 | (United States); MidO1 | (United States); MidO2 | (United States); SNM1 | (United States); SNM2 | (United States); SNM3 | - | - | - | - |
| 2012 | 98 | (United States) Steve Blethen | MYM/iTraycer | Mazda RX-8 | TC | (United States); STP1 | (United States); STP2 | (United States); MMP1 | (United States); MMP2 | (United States); MMP3 | (United States); LAG | (Canada); CTMP1; 9 | (Canada); CTMP2; 5 | (Canada); CTMP3; 6 | (United States); MidO1 | (United States); MidO2 | (United States); SNM1 | (United States); SNM2 | (United States); SNM3 | - | - | - | - |
| 2013 | 5 | (United States) Mike Skeen | Camp Quality USA/MYM | Mazda MX-5 | TC | (United States); COTA1; MEC | (United States); COTA2; MEC | (United States); COTA3; MEC | (United States); LRP1 | (United States); LRP2 | (United States); LRP3 | (Canada); TOR1 | (Canada); TOR2 | (United States); MidO1 | (United States); MidO2 | (United States); SNM1 | (United States); SNM2 | (United States); HOU1 | (United States); HOU2 | - | - | - | - |
| 2013 | 81 | (United States) Joel Lipperini | Camp Quality USA/RaceLabz/MYM | Honda Fit | TCB | (United States); COTA1; 6 | (United States); COTA2; 4 | (United States); COTA3; 4 | (United States); LRP1; 18 | (United States); LRP2; 5 | (United States); LRP3; 1 | (Canada); TOR1; 1 | (Canada); TOR2; 3 | (United States); MidO1; 3 | (United States); MidO2; 4 | (United States); SNM1; 4 | (United States); SNM2; 3 | (United States); HOU1; 2 | (United States); HOU2; 2 | 2nd | 1352 | - | - |
| 2013 | 32 | (United States) Jonathan Baker | Camp Quality USA/32Racing/MYM | Honda Fit | TCB | (United States); COTA1; 12 | (United States); COTA2; 8 | (United States); COTA3; 7 | (United States); LRP1 | (United States); LRP2 | (United States); LRP3 | (Canada); TOR1 | (Canada); TOR2 | (United States); MidO1; 6 | (United States); MidO2; 10 | (United States); SNM1 | (United States); SNM2 | (United States); HOU1; 5 | (United States); HOU2; 4 | 11th | 589 - | - | |
| 2016 | 91 | (Canada) Nick Wittmer | Honda Ste-Rose/Matt Young Motorsports | Honda Accord V6 | TC | (United States); COTA1; MEC | (United States); COTA2; 2 | (Canada); CTMP1; 1 | (Canada); CTMP2; 2 | (United States); LRP1; 1 | (United States); LRP2; 7 | (United States); RA1; 3 | (United States); RA2; 18 | (United States); UMC1; 4 | (United States); UMC2; 11 | (United States); MRLS1; 4 | (United States); MRLS2; 4 | - | - | 3rd | 971 | 2nd | 926 |
| 2018 | 5 | (United States) Max Fedler | Matt Young Motorsports | BMW M235iR Cup | TC | (United States); COTA1; 13 | (United States); COTA2; 12 | (United States); VIR1 | (United States); VIR2 | (United States); LRP1 | (United States); LRP2 | (United States); POR1 | (United States); POR2 | (United States); UMC1 | (United States); UMC2 | (United States); WGI1 | (United States); WGI2 | - | - | | | | |

| Years | Races | Poles | Wins | Podiums | Top 5s | Top 10s | Championships |
|---|---|---|---|---|---|---|---|
| 4 | 33 | 3 | 4 | 12 | 26 | 36 | 0 |

== Indy Lights ==
| Year | Driver | Sponsor | 1 | 2 | 3 | 4 | 5 | 6 | 7 | 8 | 9 | 10 | 11 | 12 | 13 | 14 | Rank | Points |
|---|---|---|---|---|---|---|---|---|---|---|---|---|---|---|---|---|---|---|
| 2004 | Jon Herb | Aercon/Old Republic International/Matt Young Motorsports | (United States); HMS | (United States); PHX | (United States); INDY; 26 | (United States); KAN | (United States); NSH | (United States); MIL | (United States); MIS | (United States); KTY | (United States); PPIR | (United States); CHI | (United States); FON; 6 | (United States); TXS; 7 | | | 18th | 67 |
| 2005 | Jon Herb | Aercon/Fossil, Inc./Matt Young Motorsports | (United States); HMS; 3 | (United States); PHX; 1 | (United States); STP; 11 | (United States); INDY; 13 | (United States); TXS; 7 | (United States); IMS; 9 | (United States); NSH; 6 | (United States); MIL; 4 | (United States); KTY; 11 | (United States); PPIR; 11 | (United States); SNM; 9 | (United States); CHI; 4 | (United States); WGL; 11 | (United States); FON; 9 | 7th | 364 |
| 2006 | Jon Herb | Aercon | (United States); HMS; 6 | (United States); STP1; 13 | (United States); STP2; 9 | (United States); INDY; 19 | (United States); WGL; 8 | (United States); IMS; 8 | (United States); NSH | (United States); MIL | (United States); KTY | (United States); SNM1 | (United States); SNM2 | (United States); CHI | | | 11th | 126 |

| Years | Races | Poles | Front Row Starts | Wins | Podiums | Top 5s | Top 10s | Championships |
|---|---|---|---|---|---|---|---|---|
| 3 | 23 | 0 | 1 | 1 | 2 | 4 | 15 | 0 |

== 2011 Continental Tire Sports Car Challenge season ==
| Year | Car # | Drivers | Sponsor | Make/Model | Class | 1 | 2 | 3 | 4 | 5 | 6 | 7 | 8 | 9 | 10 |
|---|---|---|---|---|---|---|---|---|---|---|---|---|---|---|---|
| 2011 | 89 | Marcelo Abello/Barry Ellis | Hop A Jet Worldwide Jet Charter/Gulfstream Brazil | Porsche 997 | GS | (United States); DIS; 21 | (United States); HMI | (United States); BMP | (United States); VIR | (United States); LRP | (United States); WGI | (United States); RAM | (United States); LAG | (United States); NJMP | (United States); MidO |
| 2011 | 88 | Fraser Wellon/Barry Ellis | Hop A Jet Worldwide Jet Charter | Porsche 997 | GS | (United States); DIS | (United States); HMI; 12 | (United States); BMP | (United States); VIR | (United States); LRP | (United States); WGI | (United States); RAM | (United States); LAG | (United States); NJMP | (United States); MidO; 19 |
| 2011 | 89 | Frank Rossi/Marcelo Abello | Hop A Jet Worldwide Jet Charter | Porsche 997 | GS | (United States); DIS | (United States); HMI; 19 | (United States); BMP | (United States); VIR | (United States); LRP | (United States); WGI | (United States); RAM | (United States); LAG | (United States); NJMP | (United States); MidO |
| 2011 | 88 | Jeff Courtney/Barry Ellis | Hop A Jet Worldwide Jet Charter/Kenda/RecStuff.com | Porsche 997 | GS | (United States); DIS | (United States); HMI | (United States); BMP; 23 | (United States); VIR | (United States); LRP | (United States); WGI | (United States); RAM | (United States); LAG | (United States); NJMP | (United States); MidO |
| 2011 | 89 | Harry Curtin/Andy Lee | BestIT/Matt Young Motorsports with/Heath Pearce | Porsche 997 | GS | (United States); DIS | (United States); HMI | (United States); BMP; 26 | (United States); VIR | (United States); LRP | (United States); WGI | (United States); RAM | (United States); LAG | (United States); NJMP | (United States); MidO; DNS |
| 2011 | 89 | Jack Corthell/Barry Ellis | Hop A Jet Worldwide Jet Charter | Porsche 997 | GS | (United States); DIS | (United States); HMI | (United States); BMP | (United States); VIR | (United States); LRP | (United States); WGI | (United States); RAM | (United States); LAG | (United States); NJMP | (United States); MidO; 24 |

| Years | Races | Poles | Wins | Podiums (Non-win) | Top 10s (Non-podium) | Championships |
|---|---|---|---|---|---|---|
| 1 | 4 | 0 | 0 | 0 | 0 | 0 |
