= 2007 Bombardier Learjet 550 =

Indycar race held in Fort Worth, Texas

The layout of Texas Motor Speedway

The 2007 Bombardier Learjet 550 was a race in the 2007 IRL IndyCar Series, held at Texas Motor Speedway. It was held over 7–9 June 2007, as the seventh round of the seventeen-race calendar. It was also the second of the four night races of the season.

== Classification ==
Fin. Pos	Car No.	Driver	Team	Laps	Time/Retired	Grid	Laps Led	Points
1	6	(United States) Sam Hornish Jr.	Team Penske	228	1:52:15.2873	2	159	50+3
2	11	(Brazil) Tony Kanaan	Andretti Green Racing	228	+0.0786	4	1	40
3	7	(United States) Danica Patrick	Andretti Green Racing	228	+0.3844	6	2	35
4	27	(United Kingdom) Dario Franchitti	Andretti Green Racing	228	+3.9765	3	0	32
5	4	(Brazil) Vítor Meira	Panther Racing	228	+4.0019	13	3	30
6	17	(United States) Jeff Simmons	Rahal Letterman Racing	228	+4.6340	8	5	28
7	8	(United States) Scott Sharp	Rahal Letterman Racing	227	+1 Lap	1	0	26
8	15	(United States) Buddy Rice	Dreyer & Reinbold Racing	225	+3 Laps	16	0	24
9	55	(Japan) Kosuke Matsuura	Panther Racing	225	+3 Laps	15	0	22
10	5	(United States) Sarah Fisher	Dreyer & Reinbold Racing	221	+7 Laps	18	0	20
11	23	(Venezuela) Milka Duno (R)	SAMAX Motorsport	221	+7 Laps	19	0	19
12	9	(New Zealand) Scott Dixon	Chip Ganassi Racing	206	+22 Laps	7	6	18
13	14	(United Kingdom) Darren Manning	A.J. Foyt Racing	200	Mechanical	11	0	17
14	2	(South Africa) Tomas Scheckter	Vision Racing	199	+29 Laps	9	0	16
15	10	(United Kingdom) Dan Wheldon	Chip Ganassi Racing	196	Collision	5	52	15
16	3	(Brazil) Hélio Castroneves	Team Penske	196	Collision	10	0	14
17	22	(United States) A. J. Foyt IV	Vision Racing	195	Tire/ Collision	17	0	13
18	20	(United States) Ed Carpenter	Vision Racing	195	Collision	20	0	12
19	26	(United States) Marco Andretti	Andretti Green Racing	140	Mechanical	12	0	12
20	19	(United States) Jon Herb	Racing Professionals	44	Accident	14	0	12
Lead changes: 17 between 7 drivers
