= Susan Maxman =

American architect (born 1938)

- Born: December 30, 1938 (age 87); Columbus, Ohio, US
- Occupation: Architecture
- Years active: 1977–1997
- Notable work: first woman president of American Institute of Architects in 1992
- Spouses: Leonard Frankel; William Maxman; Rolf Eric Sauer
- Website: SMP Architects

Susan A. Maxman (born 30 December 1938) is an American architect who founded a firm called Susan Maxman Architects in 1985, which she expanded to Susan Maxman & Partners Ltd in 1995. Her firm is associated with a large number of projects involving a wide spectrum of architectural services, including design of old and new buildings, restoration and rehabilitation works, master and site planning, feasibility reports, programming, historic preservation, and interior design. She was the first woman elected as president of the American Institute of Architects in 1992. Her expertise in adoption of the "principles of sustainable design" in her projects has received national appreciation, and in 2011 Maxman was nominated by President Barack Obama to the board of directors of the National Institute of Building Sciences.

== Early life ==
Maxman was born on 30 December 1938 in Columbus, Ohio, to Gussie Seiden of Palm Beach and Richard J. Abel of Miami Beach. Her older siblings were twin sisters. When she completed her high school studies at the Columbus School for Girls, Maxman continued her education at Smith College in Northampton, Massachusetts, graduating in two years. She married Leonard Frankel in 1958 and, subsequently, they had three children: Andrew, Thomas, and Elizabeth. In 1965 the couple commissioned Philadelphia architect Louis Sauer, to design a weekend home for them in New Jersey, an event that would be instrumental to Maxman's decision to eventually pursue architecture herself.

Maxman and Frankel later divorced and she married William Maxman, father of three children from an earlier marriage. The six children lived together and were compared to the "blended family" of The Brady Bunch. With six school-age children, Maxman restarted her college education in the 1970s to qualify as an architect and enrolled as a student of Louis Kahn at the University of Pennsylvania, obtaining her Master of Architecture degree in 1977.

== Professional career ==
After obtaining her master's degree in architecture in 1977, Maxman started her professional career as an architect with Kopple Sheward and Day. In 1980, she formed a partnership firm with architect Ann Sutphin, a former classmate at the University of Pennsylvania, called Maxman Sutphin Architects, but in 1985 she opened a solo firm called Susan Maxman Architects. After a decade, she expanded the firm to Susan Maxman & Partners Ltd, associating four architects with the business.

Maxman's early assignments were historic conservation and rehabilitation projects. She completed a restoration of the Girl Scout's Camp Tweedale in Oxford, Pennsylvania, and was honored by an AIA Award. The recognition led to other contracts from the Episcopal Church and the Girl Scouts and to many projects from NGOs, academic institutions, government organizations, and cultural organizations, which established her expertise in "sustainable design". Restoration of the Immaculate Heart of Mary Motherhouse in Monroe, Michigan, and the United States Fish and Wildlife Service's Cusano Environmental Education Center in Philadelphia are some of the notable projects executed by her firm.

Another assignment credited to her firm is known as "manufactured home" or prefabricated homes that are transported and erected at sites in urban areas, which was implemented in 1997 for the Manufactured Housing Institute. These houses are two storied and single storied buildings built at affordable cost which were erected in Wilkinsburg, Washington, D.C., and Louisville. These houses did not differ in their looks from other in situ-built houses in the neighborhood. William Maxman had died in 1997 and in 2001 she remarried. Her new husband, Rolf Sauer, was an architect from Philadelphia and had one daughter by an earlier marriage. Thus, Maxman has seven children, three of her own and four step children. She has 15 grandchildren.

== Memberships ==
Maxman joined the American Institute of Architecture (AIA) in 1980. From 1981 to 1987 she served on the board of directors of the Philadelphia chapter of AIA and in 1987, she became president of the Pennsylvania Society of Architects, establishing a regional magazine for them. From 1983 to 1986, she was on the AIA's Women in Architecture Committee and served as its chair in 1985. Maxman served on the national AIA Board of Directors from 1989 to 1991. She was elected the 69th AIA president—the first women to hold this position in the 134-year history of AIA—which was notable because the first women member, Louise Bethune, had been enrolled 103 years earlier in 1883. In regards to her role as the first woman president of the organization, Maxman later wrote:

It was never in my game plan at all to be president of the AIA. I just was not interested, though I was interested in promoting my ideas and trying to get the profession to look at things differently. I became interested when I talked to women architects around the country. I had been involved in the Women in Architecture group at the AIA and when I saw how women felt about the profession at the time, how hostile it was for them, and how downtrodden they were, I thought the best way to show them that you can do whatever you want if you want to do it hard enough is by example. You can get beyond the barriers and go forward and not think about being a woman, just about being the best you can be at something.

In 1992, she represented the AIA at the Earth Summit in Rio de Janeiro. As president of AIA, in one of the interviews Maxman elaborated on the theme of sustainability in architectural designs stating:

What's so annoying is that it's not new ... It's just that we've forgotten everything that we used to know as common sense. We don't use common sense anymore because when man started to control his environment by [artificial heating and cooling systems] ..., it freed us up and we forgot that wasn't really a very sustainable way to design.

In 1993, as President of the AIA, Maxman presided over the joint convention of the American Institute of Architects and the International Union of Architects (UIA), the largest gathering of architects to date, drawing an estimated 5,000 architects from more than 85 countries, Argentina to Zimbabwe to Chicago for the World Congress of Architects.

== Recognition and awards ==
Maxman's firm has received many awards and recognition for their designs. Of their 65 awards, 14 were AIA design awards and another 14 were honored for their environmental importance.

Maxman's professional recognition of membership and awards include the following:

- College of Fellows, AIA
- Honorary fellow, Royal Architectural Institute of Canada
- Member of Honor, La Federación de Colegios de Arquitectos de la República Méxicana
- Honorary doctorate, Ball State University
- Honorary doctorate, University of Detroit-Mercy
- Distinguished Daughter of Pennsylvania
- Thomas U. Walter Award (first recipient), AIA Philadelphia
- Pennsylvania's Best 50 Women in Business Award
- Shattering the Glass Ceiling, Women's National Democratic Club
- Ruth Carter Stevenson Chair, School of Architecture, University of Texas at Austin

== Bibliography ==
- Davies, Colin (15 June 2005). The Prefabricated Home. Reaktion Books. ISBN 978-1-86189-616-2.
- Porter, Douglas R. (1 January 2000). The Practice of Sustainable Development. Urban Land Institute. ISBN 978-0-87420-831-3.
