= Quarter midget racing =

Form of automobile racing

Sarah Fisher's quarter midget car in 2007

Quarter midget racing is a form of automobile racing. The cars are approximately one-quarter (1/4) the size of a full-size midget car. The adult-size midget being raced during the start of quarter midget racing used an oval track of one-fifth of a mile in length. The child's quarter midget track is one quarter that length, or 1/20 mile (264 feet; 80 m).

An adult-size midget in the 1940s and 1980s could reach 120 mph (190 km/h), while the single-cylinder 7 cu in (110 cc) quarter midget engine could make available a speed of 30 mph (48 km/h) in a rookie class (called novices), or one-quarter the speed of the adult car. Most of the competitive classes run speeds near 45 mph (72 km/h). Current upper-class quarter midgets can exceed 45 miles per hour, but remain safe due to the limited size of the track. Quarter midget racecars have four-wheel suspension, unlike go-karts.

The drivers are typically restricted to ages 5 to 16. Tracks are typically banked ovals one-twentieth of a mile long, and have surfaces of dirt, concrete, or asphalt.

== Statistics ==
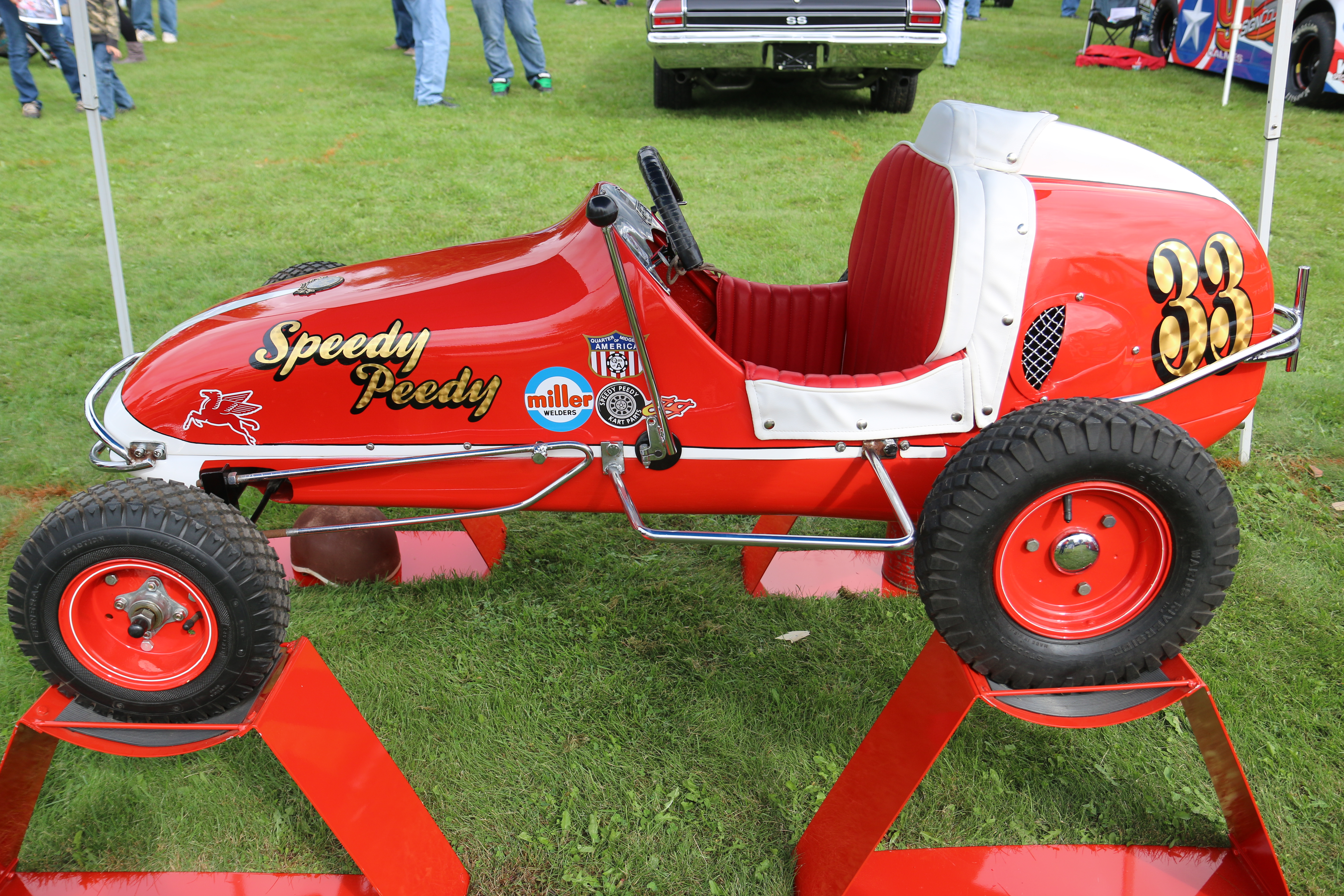
1956 quarter midget

Quarter midgets have been around in one form or another since before World War II, with NASCAR Youth Series being the premier sanctioning body for quarter midgets in the United States (previously known as USAC25 under the sanction of USAC Racing). To join today, interested families can go to nascaryouth.com. There were over 4,000 quarter midget drivers in the United States in 2007. Many of today's most recognizable names in racing got their start in quarter midgets, including A. J. Foyt, Jeff Gordon, Sarah Fisher, Jimmy Vasser, Joey Logano, Brad Keselowski, Terry Labonte, and Bobby Labonte.

The oldest continually run dirt quarter midget track east of the Mississippi is the Hulman Mini Speedway, operated since 1958 by the Terre Haute Quarter Midget Association (THQMA) located in Terre Haute, Indiana. On the west coast, the Capitol Quarter Midget Association has operated a dirt track for quarter midgets since 1954. Jeff Gordon raced in the Capitol Quarter Midget Association

Quarter midget cars can be reasonably affordable or can cost nearly as much as some full-sized racing cars. Engines can cost from $400 to 4,000. Car chassis can cost from $1,500 (used) up to $6,000 (new). Tires start at $50 each. There are many brands of cars as well as custom cars made by individuals. Some of the common brands are Stanley Racing, N/C chassis (Nervo/Coggin), Talon Chassis, Bullrider Racecars, Tad Fiser Race Cars, Rice Cars, Ashley Chassis, Cobra Race Cars, Storm Chassis, GT American, and Afco (ARC) race cars. Cars are covered by body panels which are made of fiberglass, aluminum, or occasionally carbon fiber.

Engine costs have driven a number of changes over the years. As the cost of the Deco engine platform continued to rise, Honda engines were adopted. The move from Deco to Honda was first highlighted by an exhibition race at the 1988 Western Grands in Pueblo, Colorado. Attempts to put the Deco/Continental engines back into production failed. Later problems with Honda engine revisions and parts tolerances led to the adoption of Briggs & Stratton engines as a cost-effective engine platform. This adoption has come in the form of both the World Formula and Briggs Animal engines. USAC started using Animal engines in 2010. QMA planned to introduce the Animal engine platform beginning in 2012 and begin phasing out the Honda platform altogether in 2013 but has not moved away from the Honda engine platform. USAC includes the Animal and Honda platforms. USAC has recently discarded all of the Deco platform and introduced the light and heavy modified World Formula for 2017.

== Engines and classes ==
Sources:

- Red & Blue Rookie (USAC), Jr. Novice & Adv. Novice (QMA) - Honda 120 (stock, restricted)
- Jr. Animal & Sr. Animal - Briggs & Stratton Animal engine (stock, restricted)
- Hvy. Animal - Briggs & Stratton Animal engine (stock)
- Jr. Honda - Honda 120 (stock, restricted)
- Sr. Honda - Honda 120 (stock)
- Hvy. Honda - Honda 120 (stock with Honda GX 160 carburetor)
- Jr. Super Stock & Sr. Super Stock (QMA) - Deco (stock, restricted)
- Mod (QMA) - Deco (modified)
- Jr. 160 - Honda 160 (QMA) (stock with Honda GX 120 carburetor)
- Lt. 160 - Honda 160 (stock)
- Hvy. 160 - Honda 160 (stock with Honda GX 200 carburetor)
- B (QMA) - Deco (modified)
- Modified World Formula (USAC) - Briggs and Stratton World Formula (modified, methanol)
- AA/Modified World Formula (QMA) - Deco (modified, methanol), or Briggs and Stratton World Formula (modified, methanol)
- Lt. & Hvy. World Formula - Briggs and Stratton World Formula (stock)

Junior classes are for drivers 5-8 years old, while senior classes are for drivers 9-16. Light classes are for drivers up to 100 lbs in normal street clothes. For heavy classes, drivers must be a minimum of 100 lbs.

== USAC National Championships ==
Jr. Honda: Easton Gardner Sr. Honda: Dylan Zampa Hvy. Honda: Canon Cochran Jr. 160: Roo Reaves Lt. 160: Emerson Axsom Hvy 160: Levi Rifle Jr. Animal: Gavin Boschele Sr. Animal: Nick Loden Unrestricted Animal: Gavin Gardner Light Mod: Chase Burda Light World Formula: Lincoln Smith Heavy World Formula: Canon Cochran Light AA: Connor Gross Modified World Formula: Emerson Axsom
