= The Rich and Other Atrocities =

American book (1976)

- Author: Charlotte Curtis
- Language: English
- Publisher: Harper & Row
- Publication date: 1976
- Publication place: United States
- Media type: Hardcover
- Pages: 318 pages
- ISBN: 0-06-010931-9

The Rich and Other Atrocities is a 1976 book by Charlotte Curtis, about rich Americans and their lives in the 1960s and 1970s. The book is primarily a collection of Curtis' articles for The New York Times, although it also includes original writing and articles from Harper's Bazaar and Rolling Stone. The book discusses their "social capitals" of New York, Washington and Los Angeles, as well as their vacation destinations of Palm Beach. Acapulco, Palm Springs, Las Vegas, The Hamptons, Newport. and Saratoga Springs. Curtis also profiles local elites in cities such as Boston, New Orleans, and Seattle. The book ends with a description of the party thrown by the Shah of Iran to mark the 2,500th anniversary of the Persian Empire.
