= Sarah Fisher =

American racing driver (born 1980)

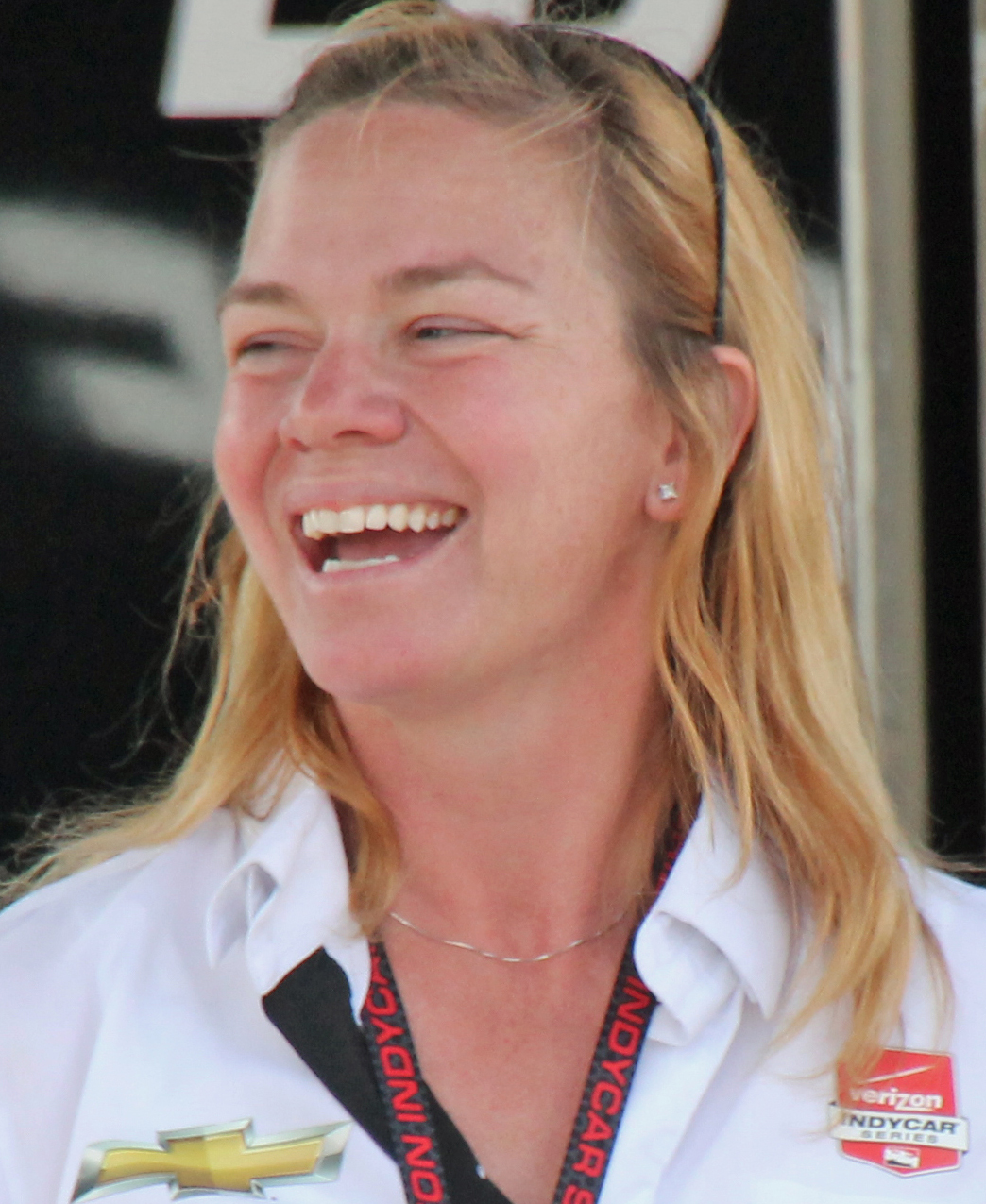
- Fisher in 2015
- Born: Sarah Marie Fisher; October 4, 1980 (age 46) Columbus, Ohio, U.S.

IRL IndyCar Series career
- Debut season: 1999
- Years active: 1999–2010
- Former teams: Sarah Fisher Racing; Dreyer & Reinbold Racing; Kelley Racing; Walker Racing; Team Pelfrey
- Starts: 81
- Wins: 0
- Podiums: 2
- Poles: 1
- Best finish: 17th in 2007

Previous series
- 2004–2005: NASCAR West Series

Championship titles
- 2017 1990: Indy Legends Charity Pro–Am race WKA Grand National Championship

Awards
- 1991, 1992, 1994 1993 1995 2001, 2002, 2003 2005 2009 2009: WKA Grand Nat'l Championship; Circleville Points Championship; Dirt Track Rookie of the Year; IndyCar Most Popular Driver; NASCAR West Most Popular Driver; Scott Brayton Driver's trophy for the Indy 500; Firestone Tireiffic Award

Sarah Marie Fisher (born October 4, 1980) is an American retired professional race car driver who competed in the Indy Racing League (IRL, now IndyCar Series) and the Indianapolis 500 intermittently from 1999 to 2010. She also raced in the NASCAR West Series in 2004 and 2005. Fisher took part in 81 IndyCar Series events, achieving a career-best finish of second at the 2001 Infiniti Grand Prix of Miami—the highest placing for a woman in the IRL until Danica Patrick's victory in the 2008 Indy Japan 300. In 2002, Fisher was the first female driver to win a pole position in a major American open-wheel race and competed in the Indianapolis 500 nine times, more than any other woman.

Fisher was born into an Ohioan family with a background in racing; she began competing at the age of five when her parents entered her in a quarter-midget race before progressing to karting three years later. She won three World Karting Association championships, and she subsequently progressed into sprint car racing, where her success was moderate. Fisher made her IRL debut at the final race of the 1999 season. During her eleven-year professional career, sponsorship problems limited her participation in the series. In 2008, Fisher established and drove for Sarah Fisher Hartman Racing until her retirement at the end of 2010.

In retirement, Fisher focused full-time on Sarah Fisher Hartman Racing, with drivers Ed Carpenter and Josef Newgarden achieving modest success with the team. She retained ownership of the team until she merged it with Ed Carpenter Racing, creating CFH Racing in 2010. In 2016, Fisher sold her stake in CFH Racing to focus on a full-time career in business in Indiana but remained with the team to help with sponsorship development. That year, she was hired as the IndyCar Series' official safety car driver, a role she shares with former driver Oriol Servià.

== Early life and junior career ==
Sarah Marie Fisher was born on October 4, 1980, in Columbus, Ohio. An only child, she hailed from a family with a racing background; Fisher's father Dave, a self-employed mechanical engineer, competed in go-kart events against race car drivers Mark Dismore and Scott Goodyear. Her mother Reba, a middle-school teacher in technology, is the daughter of Evelyn Grindell, one of Ohio's early woman aviators, and drove go-karts in the backyard of her house. The couple met at a go-kart street race in Commercial Point. Fisher's grandparents owned a go-kart track in Richwood and her uncle was a local engine builder. She grew up in Commercial Point, a small farming village 20 mi (32 km) south of Columbus, and was educated at Columbus School for Girls from preschool to third grade. As a young child, Fisher's parents tried to get her to take piano lessons, and she tried several sports, including soccer, swimming, and gymnastics; auto racing was the one thing that appealed most to her. She was taken by her parents to the local race track to watch her father compete.

Sarah Fisher's quarter midget race car, displayed at the 2007 Indianapolis 500

Fisher was given her first car, a Barbie pedal vehicle, at age four. She began racing at age five when her parents fitted her into a blue and white 3 hp (2.2 kW) quarter-midget car she used for three years. Fisher's father devised a schedule to enter her at small, indoor tracks during the winter, and both her parents supported her early racing career. She cited Jacques Villeneuve, Steve Kinser and Dave Blaney as her racing heroes. When Fisher turned eight, she began racing go-karts in her age group on the East Coast of the United States, and learned of how karts worked from her father. She was competing at the national level by the age of 11, and joined the World Karting Association (WKA), winning the Grand National Championship four times in 1991, 1993 and 1994; she was also Circleville Points Champion in 1993. Fisher and her family viewed her karting days as a family activity, not as a precedent to progression in the sport. She was introduced to endurance karting in 1994, learning endurance and patience, and reinforcing her smooth driving style. Fisher's father raised the seat in her car by 3 in (76 mm) and cut down on its front to improve her visibility, and she won the 1995 Dirt Track Racing Round-Up Rookie of the Year award.

In late 1995, John Bickford, the stepfather of Jeff Gordon, recommended Fisher to the Lyn St. James Foundation Driver Development Program and paid for all expenses. Fisher disliked the school because it focused mainly on the media and preparing the body and mind to drive and not on what the driver is doing inside the car. Not long after, her father purchased a 360 cu in (5,900 cm^{3}) sprint car and she drove eight World of Outlaws races. The following February, Fisher progressed to a 410 cu in (6,700 cm^{3}) car and raced locally with the All Star Circuit of Champions (ASCoC) during the season. She competed in all 62 races of the 1997 ASCoC, gaining a season-best finish of second at Eldora Speedway. Her father broke his arm at the start of the 1998 season, preventing him from rebuilding two engines to allow Fisher to continue racing. With her father's help, Fisher reconstructed both engines; he felt it would be better for her to compete against top-level sprint car drivers. During the year, Fisher participated in forty events; by the end of the season she had learned the techniques of driving sprint cars.

By 1999, Fisher and her father sought an alternative series to enter, following a suggestion from the CEO of one of her sponsors that she drive on pavement surfaces and not on dirt. Fisher's parents visited multiple tracks to sample three divisions of asphalt racing and they decided to enter her into the United States Auto Club (USAC) Midget division, which was the most competitive form of racing they saw. Fisher also drove in Automobile Racing Club of America (ARCA) and National Alliance of Midget Auto Racing-sanctioned events on asphalt ovals in the Midwestern United States. She won five feature races of the 23 she entered and broke Winchester Speedway's lap record. That year, Fisher graduated seventh overall in a class of 178 with honors and an A average from Teays Valley High School in Ashville, Ohio. She achieved a grade point average of 4.178, earning induction into the National Honor Society, and took 30 post-secondary credits at Columbus State Community College. Fisher enrolled at The Ohio State University in August 1999 to pursue a part-time undergraduate degree in Mechanical Engineering before she received a telephone call following the first day of classes inviting her to test an Indy Racing League (IRL) car.

== Racing career ==
=== 1999–2003 ===
Fisher's victory at Winchester Speedway attracted the attention of Team Pelfrey owner Dale Pelfrey. She signed a three-year contract to drive for Pelfrey on August 24, 1999, and passed an IRL-sanctioned rookie test at Las Vegas Motor Speedway supervised by former driver Johnny Rutherford six days later, becoming the youngest person to do so at the time. Fisher forwent a race at the track, wanting first to broaden her experience. She also chose not to enter the U.S. F2000 National Championship, a series in which several IRL drivers participated to further their careers. Since most of her previous experience was in dirt racing, she worked to familiarize herself with competing on asphalt tracks. Fisher made her IRL debut at Texas Motor Speedway, qualifying in seventeenth place, making her the youngest person to take part in an IRL event. She finished the race in 25th place, having driven into the pit lane after 66 laps to retire with a failed timing chain.

Team owner Derrick Walker sought a young driver who could appeal to both fans and his sponsors; he felt Fisher was the ideal person. Prior to the race in Texas, Walker talked to Fisher about driving for his newly formed IRL team that would be built around an American rookie driver after one of his employees asked whether he considered her. After an attorney helped Fisher terminate her contract with Pelfrey on January 18, 2000, she signed a three-year contract to drive for Walker Racing and moved to Indianapolis to be close to the team. She worked with four-time Indianapolis 500 winner and driver coach Al Unser. Fisher missed the season's first race at Walt Disney World Speedway but finished 13th at Phoenix International Raceway. After two races with the team, Walker moved Fisher from an outdated Riley & Scott car to an Oldsmobile-powered Dallara. Two races later, she became the third—and youngest—woman to compete in the Indianapolis 500; she started nineteenth but retired on the 74th lap after a collision with Lyn St. James and Jaques Lazier, finishing 31st. Over the season, Fisher occasionally raced at the front of the field, becoming the youngest woman to achieve a podium position by finishing third, and the youngest female to lead a lap in the IRL in the Belterra Resort Indy 300 at Kentucky Speedway. Her inexperience sometimes dropped her to the back of the running order in a race, and some drivers felt she was a risk in traffic. Fisher ended the year 18th in the drivers' standings and fans voted her Open Wheel Magazine Driver of the Year in the IRL category.

Fisher remained with Walker Racing for 2001, and was the first woman to compete full-time in the IRL. At the season's second race, the Infiniti Grand Prix of Miami at Homestead-Miami Speedway, she took second place, the best finish of her IRL career, and the highest for a woman until Danica Patrick's 2008 Indy Japan 300 win. Fisher qualified fifteenth for the Indianapolis 500 but retired after seven laps when her car understeered into the turn-two wall, collecting Scott Goodyear. Two races later, at Pikes Peak International Raceway for the Radisson Indy 200, Fisher came tenth, her second and final top-ten finish of 2001. During practice for the SunTrust Indy Challenge at Richmond International Raceway two weeks later, she crashed heavily in turn two and was hospitalized with neck pains. Later that day, IRL's director of medical services Henry Bock declared Fisher fit to race, and she finished in seventeenth place after qualifying a season-high second. She finished no better than eleventh in the final six races, and was nineteenth in the drivers' standings with 188 points. Fans voted Fisher the IRL's Most Popular Driver of 2001.

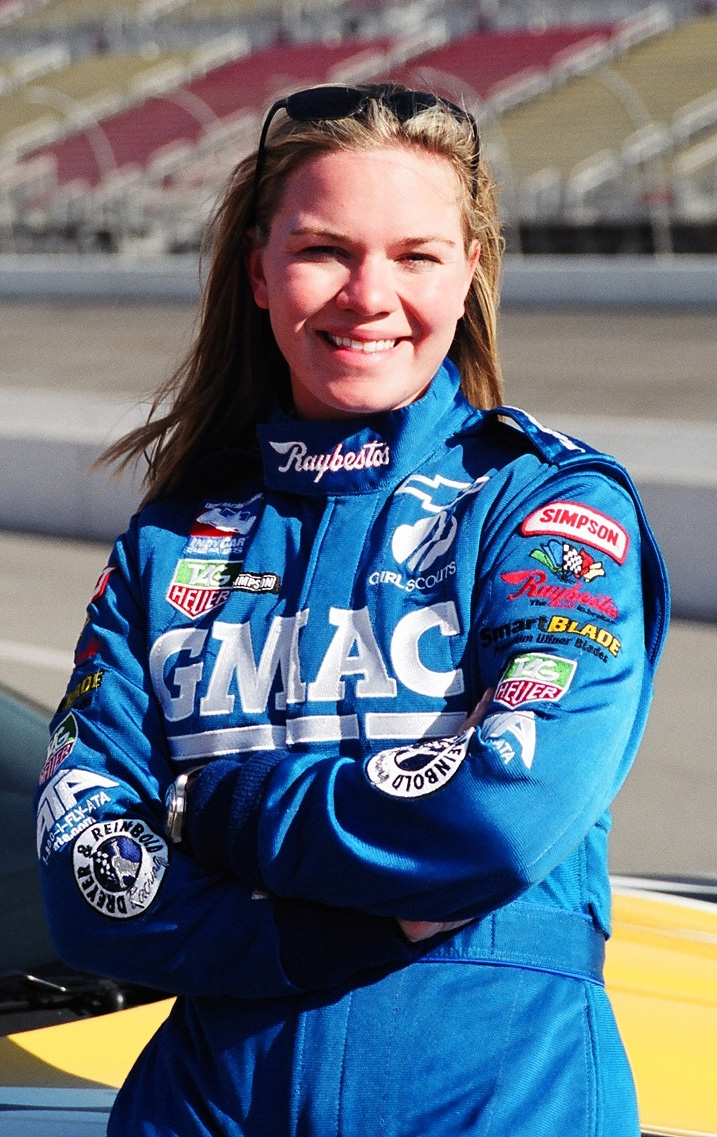
Fisher as a Dreyer & Reinbold Racing driver in 2003

On April 8, 2002, Fisher requested a release from her contract with Walker Racing after it switched to the rival Championship Auto Racing Teams (CART) full-time, and problems with finding sponsorship from her performance in the latter half of 2001 made a full IRL campaign was unfeasible. Walker wanted to enter Fisher into the Toyota Atlantic Series as preparation for CART, which she did not want to do because of her belief of the prestige of the Indianapolis 500 and wanted to help the IRL become the United States' premier open-wheel racing series. Her season began at the fund-raising Toyota Pro/Celebrity Race, where she finished third in the pro class and fifth overall. Her race engineer was Mark Weida. Two days later, Dreyer & Reinbold Racing hired Fisher to drive its No. 24 G-Force GF05C Infiniti car in place of the injured Robbie Buhl in the season's fourth round, the Firestone Indy 225, where she finished a year-best fourth.

Fisher was later signed to race in the Indianapolis 500 in May in Dreyer and Reinbold's No. 23 car. She qualified ninth and finished the race 24th. A month later, Fisher signed to drive the rest of the season with Dreyer and Reinbold. After leading four laps for eighth at the Michigan Indy 400, Fisher set a Kentucky Speedway track record at 221.390 mph (356.293 km/h) to earn the pole position for the Belterra Casino Indy 300, the first time a woman had claimed a pole in American open-wheel racing. In ten races, she scored 161 points for 18th in the championship standings. Fisher was voted by fans as IRL's Most Popular Driver for the second successive year.

In September 2002, Fisher drove a MP4-17 car in a demonstration run at Indianapolis Motor Speedway's road course in the 2002 United States Grand Prix. Fisher secured sponsorship to race the season-opening Toyota Indy 300 and Dreyer & Reinbold changed manufacturers to Dallara and engines to Chevrolet. At Phoenix International Speedway, the year's second race, she took her only top-ten finish of 2003, placing eighth. At the Indianapolis 500, she qualified in 24th; in the race, she retired after spinning into the turn-three wall due to an engine malfunction after fourteen laps, bruising her left foot and finishing in 31st. However, Fisher had received enough sponsorship funding at Indianapolis to finish the season. At the Richmond race, she had her season's best qualifying performance, recording the second-fastest lap time. Fisher did not start the Firestone Indy 225 at Nazareth Speedway because of a severe back contusion from a serious accident. She finished her 14-race season 18th in the points standings, scoring 211 points, because she drove an underpowered car and had difficulty remaining on the same lap as the race leader. Fans voted Fisher the IRL's Most Popular Driver Award for the third year in a row.

=== 2004–2007 ===
After the season, Fisher moved from Dreyer & Reinbold Racing to Kelley Racing after she learned that the team's general manager Jim Freudenberg might have had a potential seat for her; the team expressed its hope of racing in the majority of the 2004 season but Fisher did not enter the season-opening Toyota Indy 300 due to a lack of capital caused by the withdrawal of her primary sponsor December 2003. Two months later, Fisher entered the Indianapolis 500 in Kelley's No. 39 Dallara Toyota Indy V8 entry after they received sponsorship for the event. She qualified in nineteenth and finished the rain-shortened race in 21st. Afterward, she sought another team for which to drive. Later that year, Fisher made her stock car racing debut, entering a NASCAR West Series race in the No. 20 Bill McAnally Racing car at Phoenix after Richard Childress Racing (RCR) owner Richard Childress asked Bill McAnally if she could fill in for Kerry Earnhardt, who was competing in a Cup Series event at Talladega Superspeedway. This was to allow Childress to observe Fisher's ability in a stock car. Fisher qualified in fourteenth and finished in 21st place due to a battery failure after 104 laps.

Fisher drove a Chevrolet Monte Carlo for RCR's development program through NASCAR's Drive for Diversity program in the full 2005 NASCAR West Series after Childress offered her a contract to drive for Bill McNally Racing. She signed a three-year contract with RCR when Childress offered it to her with full financial support from Chevrolet, and planned to compete in the Busch East Series and the ARCA Re/Max Series in 2006. To prepare for the season, Fisher acquainted herself with the heavier, less-powerful stock cars, which she found difficult to control. She declined offers to race in the 2005 Indianapolis 500 so she could keep a promise that she made to Childress and NASCAR president Mike Helton to refrain from doing Double Duty, and wanting to avoid sending a message that she was not committed to NASCAR. She began the season with a twentieth place finish in the United Rentals 100 at Phoenix. Three races later, Fisher had her first lead-lap finish, coming in 12th in the Autozone Twin Championships before earning her first top-ten result, an eighth in the King Taco 150 at Irwindale Speedway. She qualified a season-high third in the Coors Light 200 at Evergreen Speedway; Fisher led the first laps for a woman in NASCAR West Series history, finishing 11th. She had top-ten finishes at Pikes Peak, Thunderhill Raceway and Mesa Marin Raceway for a final championship standing of 12th with 1,471 points. Fisher's results made her eligible for the exhibition Toyota All-Star Showdown, where she finished eleventh. She was named the NASCAR West Series Rookie of the Year and fans voted her the Most Popular Driver.

After she could not put together a full NASCAR program due to sponsorship problems, Fisher moved back to Indianapolis to find and prepare for a full-time role in the IndyCar Series. Although she missed the 2006 Indianapolis 500, Dreyer & Reinbold Racing signed her to a one-race contract for the Meijer Indy 300 in Kentucky. Fisher secured the seat by staying in contact with the team through her engagement with tire changer Andy O'Gara, as well as attending several IndyCar races throughout 2006. Additionally, the team contacted prospective sponsors requesting sufficient funding for her participation in place of Ryan Briscoe, who had Supercars commitments. Fisher finished in her starting position of twelfth after car setup problems. Her performance in this race led Dreyer & Reinbold to hire her for the season-ending Peak Antifreeze Indy 300 at Chicagoland Speedway. Fisher ended the event in sixteenth, giving her a two-race points total of 32. She finished the year 25th in the drivers' standings.

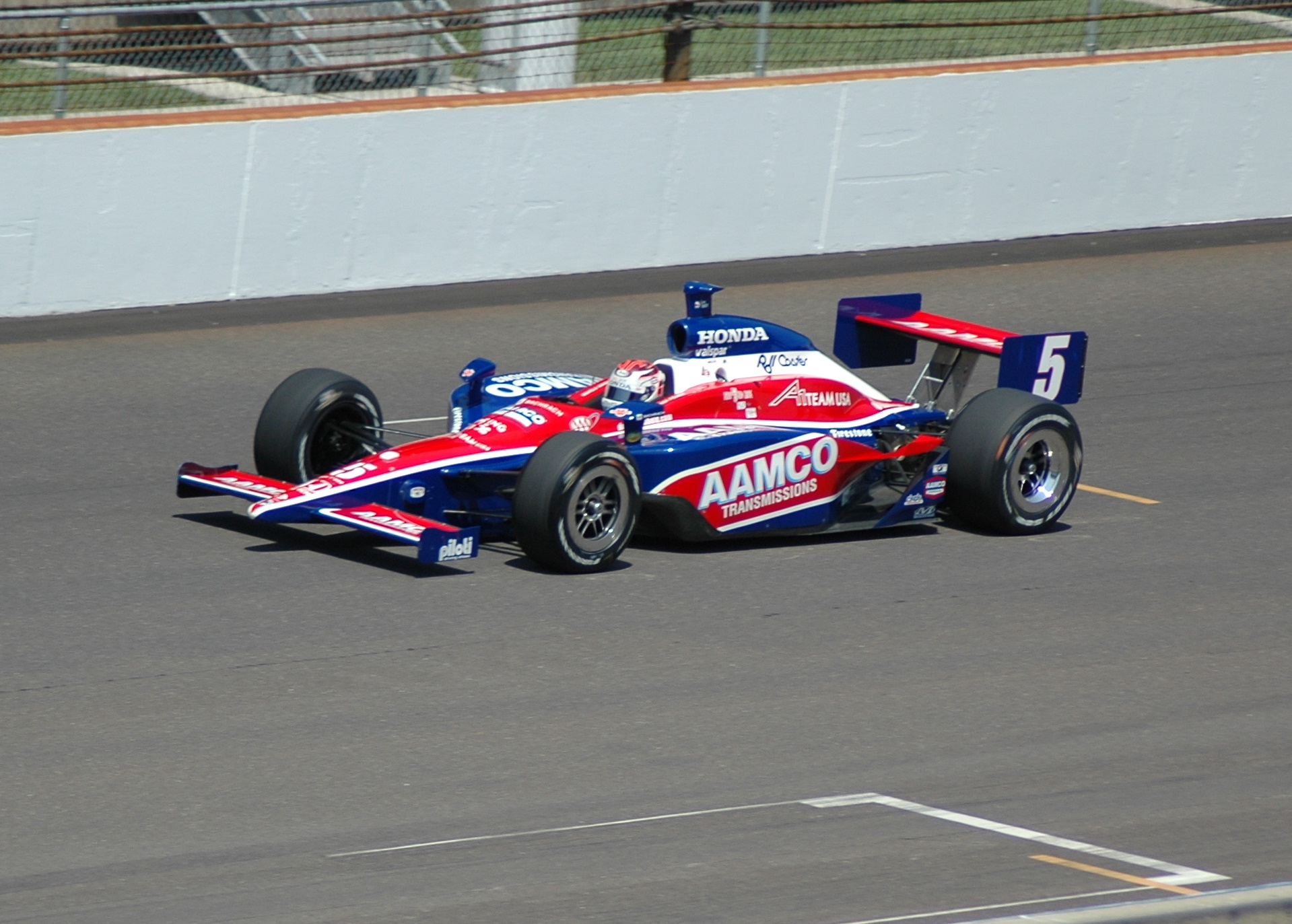
Fisher practicing for the 2007 Indianapolis 500

Fisher returned to Dreyer & Reinbold for 2007 after the team expanded to two cars. Starting eighth in the season-opening XM Satellite Radio Indy 300 at Homestead–Miami Speedway, her best qualifying performance of the season, she finished in 11th place. Although Fisher's team did not originally plan for her to compete on road courses, Dreyer & Reinbold later added those races to Fisher's schedule. The first and best road-course finish of Fisher's career was a fifteenth place result at the Honda Grand Prix of St. Petersburg, the season's second round. At the Indianapolis 500, Fisher qualified in 21st place, finishing eighteenth in the rain-shortened 166 lap race. Although Fisher struggled with her performance throughout the remainder of the season due to an uncompetitive car, she had two top-ten finishes; tenth at Texas Motor Speedway and seventh at Iowa Speedway. She finished seventeenth in the drivers' championship with 275 points.

=== 2008–2010 ===
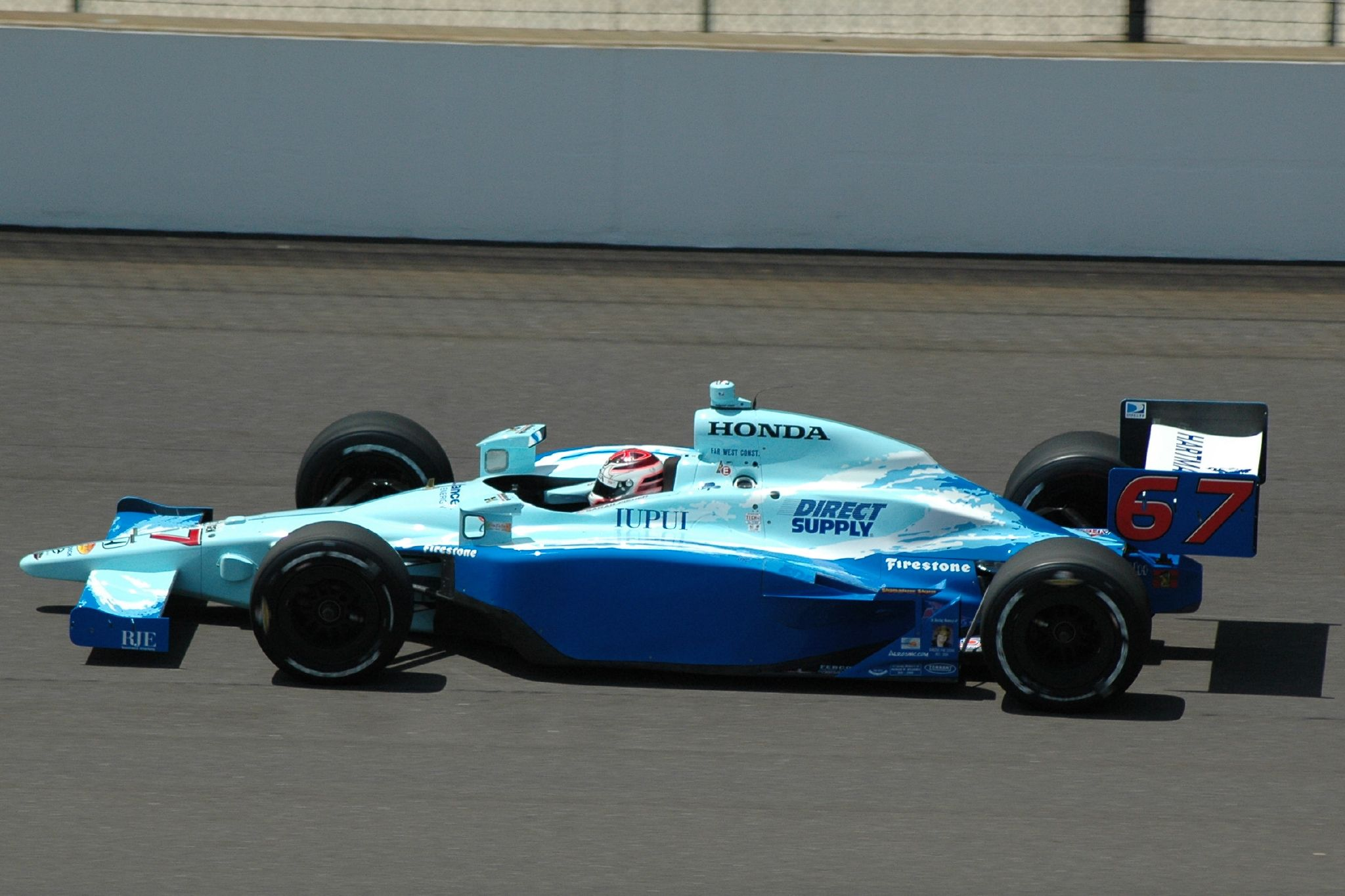
Fisher driving in practice for the 2008 Indianapolis 500

Fisher left Dreyer & Reinbold at the conclusion of the season to establish Sarah Fisher Racing with her husband Andy O'Gara, father-in-law John O'Gara and agent Klint Briney in February 2008. She drove part-time in the No. 67 Dallara IR-05 Honda HI7R car. To compete in the Indianapolis 500, Fisher relied on fan funding and had to secure $1 million from sponsors to enter the race after funding from an energy drinks company failed to materialize. She qualified in 22nd place. In the race, Fisher was collected by Tony Kanaan after he spun exiting turn three on the 106th lap. She finished thirtieth. Afterward, she expressed concerns to ESPN reporter Jamie Little about not being able to enter any more events that year due to sponsorship issues. Fisher eventually obtained financial support for the Kentucky and Chicagoland races. She finished fifteenth in Kentucky after her rear-right suspension broke while battling Danica Patrick in turn one. At Chicagoland, she bruised her right ankle in a heavy collision with a SAFER barrier due to a mechanical fault, finishing in 24th place. With 37 points, she was 34th in the final standings.

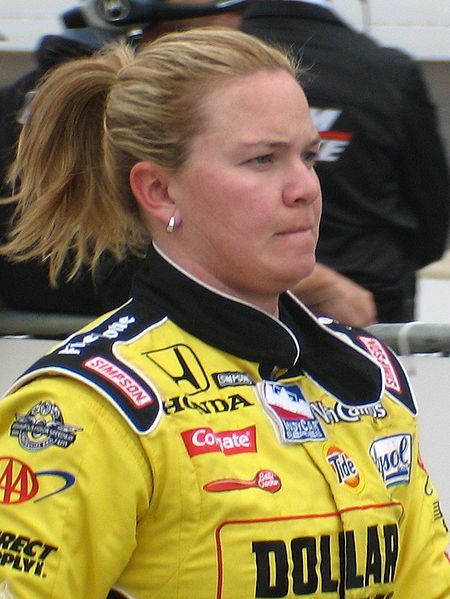
Fisher during qualifying for the 2009 Indianapolis 500

In January 2009, Fisher received funding from her primary team sponsor to enter four oval-track events in the season: Kansas, Indianapolis, Kentucky and Chicagoland. She did not race a full schedule due to budgetary constraints caused by the 2008 financial crisis. After finishing thirteenth in Kansas, she received additional sponsorship funding to compete at Texas and Homestead-Miami. She qualified 21st at the Indianapolis 500, finishing a career-best seventeenth place. By starting, she broke the record for the most starts by a woman in Indianapolis 500 history with eight. She received the Scott Brayton Award, voted on by the media and presented to the driver who best exemplified "the character and racing spirit of the late driver Scott Brayton." Fisher's best result for the rest of 2009 was a twelfth place finish at Kentucky. Her final championship placing was 25th, accruing 89 points.

Although the press initially reported that Fisher would compete in the 2010 Honda Grand Prix of St. Petersburg for the first time since 2007, she chose to forgo the race and the following Indy Grand Prix of Alabama at Barber Motorsports Park and replace herself with fellow American driver Graham Rahal, persuading her primary sponsor that Rahal was ideal for her team. The two-race agreement reduced Fisher's 2010 schedule from nine to seven rounds. Thus, her first race of 2010 was at Kansas, where she finished seventeenth after a season-best qualifying start of fourteenth. At the Indianapolis 500, Fisher had a career-worst start of 29th; she finished the race 26th after she was collected in a lap 124 multi-car crash. Fisher's best result of the season was a fifteenth place, which she achieved in Texas as well as in Chicagoland. She ended the season with a 22nd-place finish at Homestead-Miami Speedway. Fisher was 26th in the drivers' standings with 92 points. She looked for a full-time driver to replace her because she thought her driving was taking away from her ability to adequately run the team. Fisher left open that she would still run a part-time schedule the next season. In November, however, she announced her retirement from racing, and driver Ed Carpenter replaced her in the No. 67 car for the 2011 season.

== Post-racing career ==
In her first season solely as a team owner, Fisher focused on all of the oval track races of the 2011 championship with seventeen employees. In May 2011, she was appointed to a three-year term on the National Women's Business Council, a nonpartisan advisory panel to the President of the United States and Congress on woman's business issues. On the council, Fisher represented women in the entertainment and sporting industries, and she later participated in research initiatives aimed at helping women enter the American business sector. She formed a partnership with businessman and oil tycoon Wink Hartman in late 2011, and the renamed Sarah Fisher Hartman Racing team began competing in the IndyCar Series full-time from 2012 onward. As co-owner of Sarah Fisher Hartman Racing, Fisher had moderate success; Carpenter took the team's only IndyCar Series victory at the 2011 Kentucky Indy 300, and two-second-place finishes were scored by his successor Josef Newgarden—one in each of 2013 and 2014.

In 2015, Fisher returned to competitive racing by entering the Chili Bowl; she had watched her brother-in-law participate at the race in 2014. Fisher's brother-in-law and several other drives helped to acquaint her with driving midget cars on dirt. She reached the C-Features portion of the tournament and was eliminated at that stage after finishing sixth in its first race. That year, Sarah Fisher Hartman Racing merged with Ed Carpenter Racing to form CFH Racing. Newgarden won the 2015 Honda Indy Grand Prix of Alabama and the Honda Indy Toronto; he also earned two-second-place finishes at Pocono Raceway and Iowa Speedway. In January 2016, Fisher entered her second Chili Bowl, driving the No. 67SF car. She was eliminated after failing to finish high enough in the I-Main Division heat to advance further in the tournament.

Also in January 2016, Fisher sold her share in CFH Racing that month but stayed on to help the renamed Ed Carpenter Racing with sponsorship development, working with the team's existing partners. She focused on establishing a business venture, the Speedway Indoor Karting track in Speedway, Indiana, which began operations three months later. In September 2018, Fisher was part of a group of former team owners that purchased the defunct Whiteland Raceway Park in Whiteland, Indiana. The track reopened in October 2018.

In March 2016, Fisher accepted an offer by IndyCar's president of competition and operations Jay Frye to be its pace car driver for fourteen out of sixteen races, after the aging Johnny Rutherford retired for all but two events because he wanted to return home after his wife became ill. Fisher was the sole driver of the pace car for 2017, but she shared the duties with former driver Oriol Servià in 2018, since she was not available for every race. She continued to drive the pace car at the Indianapolis 500 the following years. In 2022, she was the honorary pace car driver as well.

== Public image and philanthropy ==
Fisher is listed at 5 ft 2 in (1.57 m) and 120 lb (54 kg). Amy Rosewater of USA Today noted that Fisher was called "the poster child of the IRL" in its formative years. Dave Scheiber of the St. Petersburg Times describes her as having a "upbeat style, big smile and engaging laugh that punctuates her conversations," making her popular with IndyCar's fanbase. Unlike Patrick, Fisher did not promote herself by exploiting her glamorous side, stating "That's definitely not me. It's not my personality." She had difficulty finding funding throughout her career because sponsors wanted her to be "more than a novelty in a man's sport" and become competitive.

Fisher was the first female driver who had experience in midget and sprint car racing to compete at the Indianapolis 500. Fisher eschewed the issue of gender, saying "I definitely don't look that way, The car doesn't know if it's being driven by a man or woman." Although team owner Derrick Walker said Fisher moved into top-level open-wheel racing early because she was a woman, she was included on Sports Illustrated's list of Top 10 Female Race Car Drivers in the World in 2007.

In June 2002, Fisher lent her support to the Girl Scouts' campaign "Girls Go Tech," which encourages young women to study science, technology, engineering and mathematics. She worked with the ALS Association Indiana Chapter in late 2011, raising more than $25,000 in a fundraiser in Beech Grove, Indiana to promote awareness of amyotrophic lateral sclerosis after an employee of Sarah Fisher Hartman Racing was diagnosed with the disease. Fisher co-wrote a book titled "99 Things Women Wish They Knew Before Getting Behind the Wheel of Their Dream Job" in 2010.

== Personal life ==
Fisher entered Butler University in 2000, studying part-time for a degree in mechanical engineering but leaving before she finished her course because of the demands of her racing schedule. She also enrolled at Ellis College of the New York Institute of Technology for a short time. In August 2013, Fisher began studying for a bachelor's degree at WGU Indiana's College of Business. The university allowed her to be flexible with her scheduling arrangements, and she graduated in April 2019.

Fisher married front-left tire changer Andy O'Gara on September 15, 2007, at St. Roch Catholic Church in front of members of the IndyCar community. They have two children, who compete in racing events.

== Motorsports career results ==
=== American open wheel results ===
(key) (Races in bold indicate pole position; Small number denotes finishing position)

==== IRL IndyCar Series ====
Year	Team	No.	Chassis	Engine	1	2	3	4	5	6	7	8	9	10	11	12	13	14	15	16	17	18	19	Rank	Points	Ref
1999	Team Pelfrey	48	Dallara IR9	Oldsmobile	WDW	PHX	CLT^{1}	INDY	TXS	PPIR	ATL	DOV	PP2	LVS	TX2; 25									46th	5	
2000	Walker Racing	15	Riley & Scott Mk V	Oldsmobile	WDW	PHX; 13	LVS; 17																	18th	124	
2000	Walker Racing	15	Dallara IR-00	Oldsmobile				INDY; 31	TXS; 12	PPIR; 25	ATL; 14	KTY; 3	TX2; 11											18th	124	
2001	Walker Racing	15	Dallara IR-01	Oldsmobile	PHX; 17	HMS; 2	ATL; 11	INDY; 31	TXS; 18	PPIR; 10	RIR; 17	KAN; 12	NSH; 19	KTY; 19	GTW; 11	CHI; 24	TX2; 25							19th	188	
2002	Dreyer & Reinbold Racing	24	G-Force GF05C	Infiniti	HMS	PHX	FON	NZR; 4																18th	161	
2002	Dreyer & Reinbold Racing	23	G-Force GF05C	Infiniti					INDY; 24	TXS	PPIR	RIR; 16	KAN; 14	NSH; 22	MIS; 8	**KTY**; 8	GTW; 20	CHI; 22	TX2; 11					18th	161	
2003	Dreyer & Reinbold Racing	23	Dallara IR-03	Chevrolet	HMS; 15	PHX; 8	MOT; 23	INDY; 31	TXS; 15	PPIR; 20	RIR; 19	KAN; 11	NSH; 20	MIS; 15	GTW; 13	KTY; 14	NZR; DNS	CHI; 18	FON; 19	TX2; 12				18th	211	
2004	Kelley Racing	39	Dallara IR-04	Toyota	HMS	PHX	MOT	INDY; 21	TXS	RIR	KAN	NSH	MIL	MIS	KTY	PPIR	NZR	CHI	FON	TX2				31st	12	
2006	Dreyer & Reinbold Racing	5	Dallara IR-05	Honda	HMS	STP	MOT	INDY	WGL	TXS	RIR	KAN	NSH	MIL	MIS	KTY; 12	SNM	CHI; 16						25th	32	
2007	Dreyer & Reinbold Racing	5	Dallara IR-05	Honda	HMS; 11	STP; 15	MOT; 14	KAN; 12	INDY; 18	MIL; 14	TXS; 10	IOW; 7	RIR; 16	WGL; 16	NSH; 15	MDO; 15	MIS; 16	KTY; 14	SNM; 17	DET; 16	CHI; 12			17th	275	
2008	Sarah Fisher Racing	67	Dallara IR-05	Honda	HMS	STP	MOT^{2}	LBH^{2}	KAN	INDY; 30	MIL	TXS	IOW	RIR	WGL	NSH	MDO	EDM	KTY; 15	SNM	DET	CHI; 24	SRF^{3}	34th	37	
2009	Sarah Fisher Racing	67	Dallara IR-05	Honda	STP	LBH	KAN; 13	INDY; 17	MIL	TXS; 17	IOW	RIR	WGL	TOR	EDM	KTY; 12	MDO	SNM	CHI; 14	MOT	HMS; 18			25th	89	
2010	Sarah Fisher Racing	67	Dallara IR-05	Honda	SAO	STP	ALA	LBH	KAN; 17	INDY; 26	TXS; 15	IOW; 22	WGL	TOR	EDM	MDO	SNM	CHI; 15	KTY; 22	MOT	HMS; 22			26th	92	

^{1} The VisionAire 500K was abandoned after three spectators were killed when debris from a crash on the track went into the grandstands.
^{2} Run on same day.
^{3} Non-points-paying, exhibition race.

Years	Teams	Races	Poles	Wins	Podiums (non-win)	Top 10s (non-podium)	Indianapolis 500 wins	Championships	Ref
11	5	83	1	0	2	7	0	0	

==== Indianapolis 500 ====
Year	Chassis	Engine	Start	Finish	Team
2000	Dallara IR-00	Oldsmobile Aurora V8	19	31	Walker Racing
2001	Dallara IR-01	Oldsmobile Aurora V8	15	31	Walker Racing
2002	G-Force GF05C	Infiniti VRH35ADE V8	9	24	Dreyer & Reinbold Racing
2003	Dallara IR-03	Chevrolet Indy V8	24	31	Dreyer & Reinbold Racing
2004	Dallara IR-04	Toyota Indy V8	19	21	Kelley Racing
2007	Dallara IR-05	Honda HI7R V8	21	18	Dreyer & Reinbold Racing
2008	Dallara IR-05	Honda HI7R V8	22	30	Sarah Fisher Racing
2009	Dallara IR-05	Honda HI7R V8	21	17	Sarah Fisher Racing
2010	Dallara IR-05	Honda HI7R V8	29	26	Sarah Fisher Racing

=== NASCAR ===
(key) (Bold – Pole position awarded by qualifying time. Italics – Pole position earned by points standings or practice time. * – Most laps led. Small number denotes finishing position)

==== West Series ====
NASCAR West Series results
Year	Team	No.	Make	1	2	3	4	5	6	7	8	9	10	11	12	13	NWSC	Pts	Ref
2004	Bill McAnally Racing	20	Chevy	PHO	MMR	CAL	S99	EVG	IRW	S99	RMR	DCS	PHO; 21	CNS	MMR	IRW	62nd	100	
2005	Bill Maropulos Racing	20	Chevy	PHO; 20	MMR; 16	PHO; 28	S99; 12	IRW; 8	EVG; 11	S99; 17	PPR; 9	CAL; 22	DCS; 12	CTS; 6	MMR; 7		12th	1471	

Awards
Preceded by Vítor Meira	Scott Brayton Award; 2009	Succeeded by Discontinued
