= Columbus School for Girls =

Private girls school in Bexley, Ohio, US

Location
- 65 South Drexel Avenue; Bexley, (Franklin County), Ohio 43209; United States; 39°58′5″N 82°56′18″W

Information
- Type: Private, College-prep, All-girls
- Motto: Forte et Gratum ((Strength and Grace))
- Established: 1898
- Founder: Mary Bole Scott and Florence Kelley
- CEEB code: 361530
- Head of School: Camille J.L. Seals
- Grades: PK–12
- Enrollment: 530
- Average class size: 13
- Colors: Red and gold
- Song: Schoolmates, Lift Your Voices
- Athletics conference: Central Buckeye League
- Mascot: Unicorn
- Team name: Unicorns
- Accreditation: Independent Schools Association of the Central States (ISACS)
- Newspaper: Silhouette
- Yearbook: Topknot
- Website: columbusschoolforgirls.org

Columbus School for Girls (CSG) is a private, all-girls, college-preparatory day school located in Bexley, Ohio, United States, an enclave of Columbus. It serves students from preschool to 12th grade and it is the only all-girls high school in Franklin County.

== History ==
- In 1898, Mary Bole Scott and Florence Kelley established Columbus School for Girls. The school was intended to replace the traditional "finishing school" for young women by adopting a solid college preparatory educational program.
- On September 22, 1898, Columbus School for Girls began their first school session.
- On June 2, 1899, the first commencement was held for two graduates
- In 1904, Alice Gladden and Grace Latimer Jones succeeded Miss Scott and Miss Kelley. A daughter of renowned Congregational Minister Washington Gladden, Alice Gladden (1904–1926) established the daily chapel services which remain a part of the school's traditions today. Miss Jones (1904–1938, latterly Mrs. McClure) strengthened the concept of an academically demanding education for girls and expanded the college preparatory curriculum. While the disciplines of English, mathematics, and foreign languages were stressed, Columbus School for Girls also included studies in theater, music, and fine arts.
- In 1927, the School was incorporated as a nonprofit institution.
- From 1938 to 1946, the headmaster was Dr. Samuel Shellabarger, historian, educator and writer of many historical novels, including "Captain from Castile" and "Prince of Foxes."
- In 1953, under headmistress Beatrice Constance Marvin, the School moved from a deteriorating Columbus neighborhood at Bryden Road and Parsons Avenue to a property on Broad Street at Columbia, in the suburb of Bexley.
- In 1957, headmaster Dr. Arleigh D. Richardson III instituted a policy of open admissions, loathing the national practice of segregation that existed in most independent schools across the country.
- In 1966, under Headmaster John V. Chapman's guidance, the school expanded its enrollment and began a building program.
- In 1969, ground was broken for a large addition on the Bexley site. The facilities, including a lower school, library, gymnasium with pool and locker room, fine arts complex, and theater-in-the-round were completed in 1970.
- In 1985, headmistress Patricia T. Hayot, Ph.D., promoted an interdisciplinary style of learning and guided CSG's decision to remain firmly committed to single-sex education. During her 18-year tenure, the School grew from one to three campuses, comprising more than 180 acres. The 10-acre main campus in Bexley houses the academic and administrative buildings, including the original Columbia Avenue mansion. The Kirk Campus, a 70-acre athletic facility is nearby. The third campus, Cynthia's Woods, consists of nearly 100 acres of environmentally protected woodland.
- In 2003, headmistress Diane B. Cooper was appointed. During her tenure, broad plans to renovate and expand the Bexley campus were initiated. This set of plans later became known as the Landmark Campaign and included such developments as the construction of a new Athletics Complex and theater, as well as numerous renovations of preexisting campus areas.
- In 2009, Ms. Elizabeth (Liza) Lee assumed the Head of School position. She realized the renovation plans as part of the Landmark Campaign, including the establishment of a new Athletics Complex in 2012 which features an eight lane pool, yoga room, lobby, and fitness center. Major renovations were also made to the dining room and commons during her tenure.
- In 2014, Jennifer M. Ciccarelli was appointed as the 13th Head of School on July 1.
- In 2015, the new Agnes Jeffrey Shedd Theater, a 400-seat performing arts center, was dedicated.
- In 2022, Camille J.L. Seals was made 14th Head of School on July 1.

== Traditions ==
- Cum Laude happens every year to bring in all the most academically accomplished students into the society. In 2022, nine students were inducted.
- Every first school day of the month, the dining staff makes chicken fingers and fries.
- Every year students in Form XII (seniors) host Senior Day, a festival of activities for the younger students. It always occurs on the last day before spring break.

== Faculty and accreditation ==
Columbus School for Girls is accredited by the Independent Schools Association of the Central States, and the National Association of Independent Schools. Columbus School for Girls is also affiliated with the International Coalition of Girls Schools and the Ohio Associations of Independent Schools.

== Academics ==
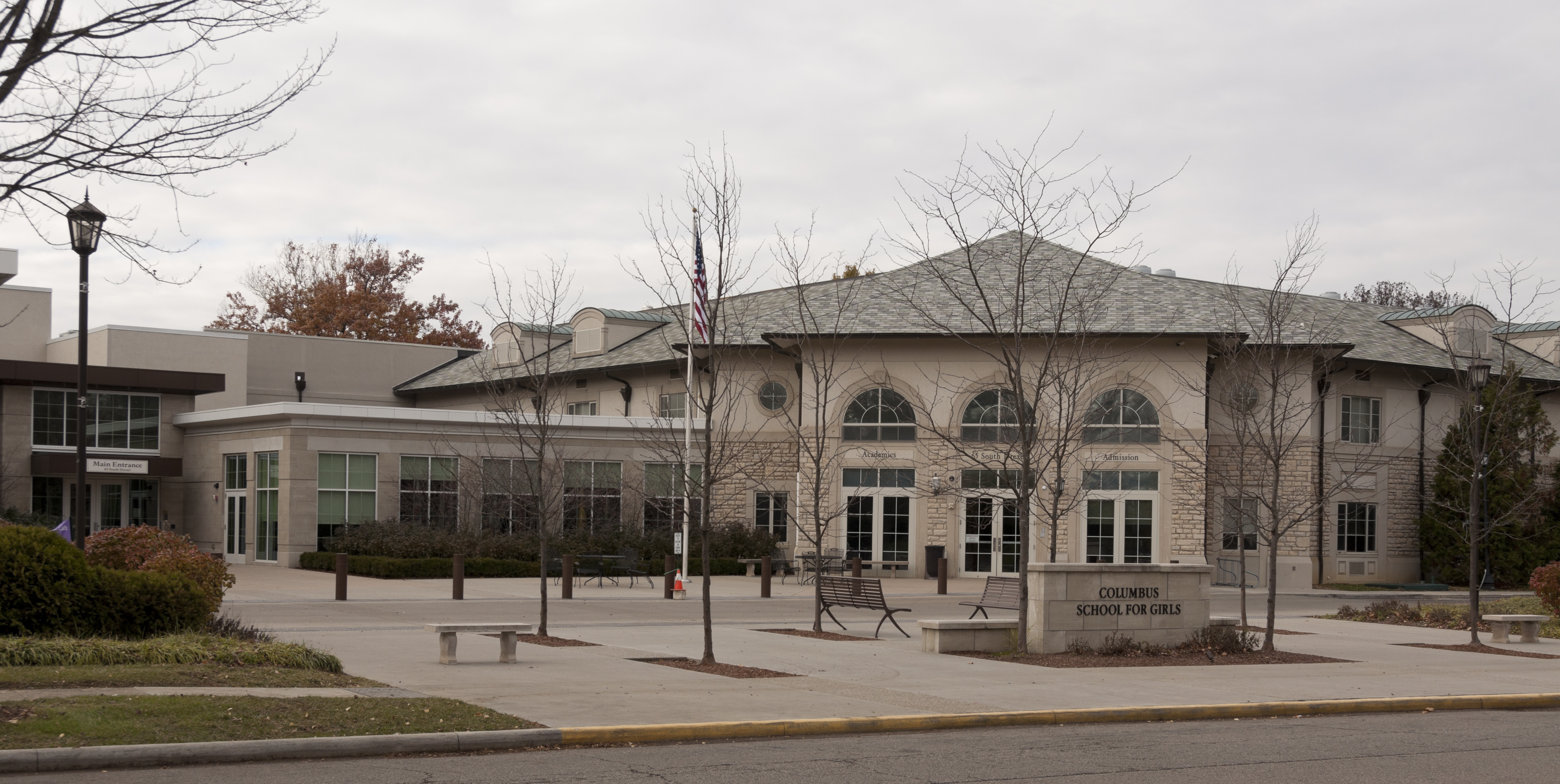
Columbus School for Girls Main Entrance

CSG offers programs for children from pre-K through 12th grade.

The Program for Young Children, or "PYC" (the equivalent of preschool and kindergarten) includes introductions to language arts, social studies, math, science, and physical education.

The Lower School includes Forms I through V (1st through 5th grade). The curriculum for the Lower School includes courses in language arts, library research, math, science, Spanish, visual arts, general music, technology, an integrated studies program, and physical education.

The Middle School consists of Forms VI through VIII (6th through 8th grade). The curriculum in the Middle School includes language arts, library, math, science, foreign language, technology, physical education, music, fine arts, theater, health, history, and performance ensembles.

The Upper School is for students in Forms IX through XII (9th through 12th grade). The Upper School has the broadest selection of courses. Courses offered include various literature, English, music, visual arts, theater, music ensemble, foreign language, ancient and modern history, technology, mathematics, science, and physical education classes.

== Clubs and activities ==
CSG offers more than 30 academic and special-interest clubs. The school's Latin Club functions as a local chapter of both the Ohio Junior Classical League (OJCL) and National Junior Classical League (NJCL). There is the opportunity for foreign travel, including a German foreign exchange student program. Students from the Lower, Middle, and Upper Schools can participate in the FIRST Robotics Program.

== Athletics ==
Athletic activities in the Lower School include field hockey, tennis, golf, volleyball, and basketball. For Middle and Upper School students, the choices expand to include field hockey, tennis, golf, track & field, swimming & diving, cross country, volleyball, basketball, lacrosse, and soccer. The Varsity Girls' Field Hockey team won the Ohio High School Athletic Association State Championship in 1987. CSG's mascot is the unicorn, and its team name is the Unicorns. The Unicorns are part of the Mid-State League of the Ohio High School Athletic Association.

== Notable alumnae ==
- Anne Burr - actress who was one of the first soap opera stars
- Lucille Atcherson Curtis - first woman in what become the U.S. Foreign Service
- Ellis Avery - author
- Charlotte Curtis—first woman to appear on the New York Times masthead
- Nika Elugardo—member of the Massachusetts House of Representatives
- Sarah Fisher—American race car driver
- Ann Hamilton - visual artist
- Susan Maxman - first elected woman president of American Institute of Architects
- Anna Shannon McAllister—American historian of Catholic women's history.
- Lynn Toler - judge on Divorce Court
