= Anna McAllister =

American historian

Anna Shannon McAllister
- Born: March 11, 1888; Cincinnati, Ohio
- Died: October 9, 1961 (aged 73); Columbus, Ohio
- Education: Ohio State University (B.A.)
- Occupation: Historian
- Spouse: Earl Sadler McAllister

Anna McAllister (March 11, 1888 – October 9, 1961) was an American historian of Catholic women's history.

== Life and work ==
Anna Shannon McAllister was born in Cincinnati, Ohio on March 11, 1888. Educated by the Sisters of Notre Dame de Namur, she graduated from the Columbus School for Girls and then earned her B.A. degree from Ohio State University in 1909. She married Earl Sadler McAllister two years later. She collected family papers to write her biography, Ellen Ewing, Wife of General Sherman in 1934. The book was the Catholic Book of the Month Club selection for June 1936 and was awarded third prize in the 1938 nonfiction contest of the National League of American Penwomen. Her next book was a biography of Sarah Worthington King Peter, In Winter We Flourish in 1939. She wrote Flame in the Wilderness five years later, a biography of Mother Angela Gillespie, the American founder of the Sisters of the Holy Cross. McAllister was a member of the Daughters of the American Revolution, the American Association of University Women, and the Columbus Chapter of the National League of American Penwomen. She was the president of the Columbus chapter of the National Society of Arts and Letters from 1946 to 1947.

She died in Columbus on October 9, 1961.
