= 2007 XM Satellite Radio Indy 300 =

Motor race held in Homestead, Florida

(United States) 2007 XM Satellite Radio Indy 300
Race details
Race 1 of 17 in the 2007 IndyCar season
← Previous race	Next race →
- Date: March 24, 2007
- Official name: XM Satellite Radio Indy 300
- Location: Homestead–Miami Speedway, Homestead, Florida
- Course: Permanent racing facility 1.500 mi / 2.414 km
- Distance: 200 laps 300.000 mi / 482.803 km

Pole position
- Driver: (United Kingdom) Dan Wheldon (Chip Ganassi Racing)
- Time: 24.9438

Fastest lap
- Driver: (United Kingdom) Dan Wheldon (Chip Ganassi Racing)
- Time: 24.9303 (on lap 112 of 200)

Podium
- First: (United Kingdom) Dan Wheldon (Chip Ganassi Racing)
- Second: (New Zealand) Scott Dixon (Chip Ganassi Racing)
- Third: (United States) Sam Hornish Jr. (Team Penske)

The 2007 XM Satellite Radio Indy 300 was an IndyCar Series motor race held on March 24, 2007, in Homestead, Florida at Homestead–Miami Speedway. It was the first of the 2007 IndyCar Series and the 12th running of the event (7th under Indy Racing League sanctioning). Chip Ganassi Racing's Dan Wheldon won the 200-lap race. Wheldon's teammate Scott Dixon finished second and Sam Hornish Jr. came in third for Team Penske.

Wheldon posted the fastest lap of both practice sessions and qualifying, giving him the pole position. He was the most dominant driver of the race, leading all but 21 laps. Even after being relegated to ninth due to a pit road miscue on lap 103, Wheldon quickly made his way through the field and reclaimed the lead for good by passing Dixon on the 120th lap. Wheldon's victory was the 12th of his IndyCar Series career and earned him the lead in the Drivers' Championship.

== Background ==
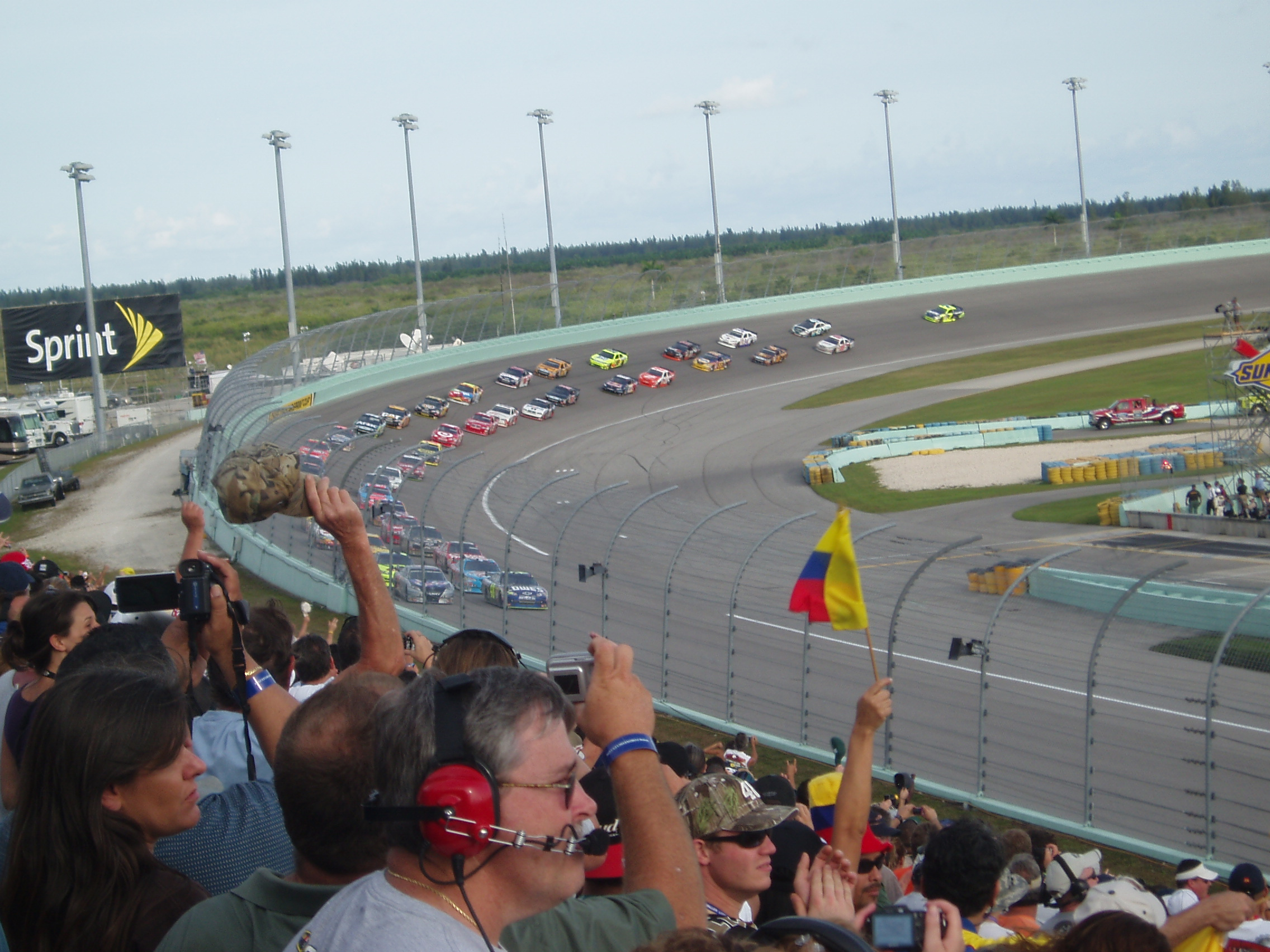
Homestead–Miami Speedway (pictured in 2009), where the race was held.

The XM Satellite Radio Indy 300 was the first of 17 scheduled open-wheel races for the 2007 IndyCar Series and the 12th annual edition of the event, counting the period from 1996 to 2000 when it was sanctioned by Championship Auto Racing Teams (CART). It was held on March 24, 2007, in Homestead, Florida, United States, at Homestead–Miami Speedway, a four-turn 1.5 mi (2.4 km) asphalt oval track with 18-degree banking in the turns and 4-degree banking on the front stretch and back stretch. It was announced in September 2006 that the race would be held at night, making the IndyCar Series the first open-wheel series in history to open a season with a nighttime race.

Ahead of the 2007 season, many of the drivers opted to swap teams. One of the most publicized changes was Danica Patrick's move to Andretti Green Racing, replacing the now-retired Bryan Herta. Patrick was one of two female drivers planning to compete full-time in 2007, the other being series veteran Sarah Fisher, who joined Dreyer & Reinbold Racing alongside Buddy Rice after partnering with the team for the final two oval races of the 2006 season. As Fernández Racing focused their efforts on the American Le Mans Series, Scott Sharp teamed with Jeff Simmons at Rahal Letterman Racing and Kosuke Matsuura moved to Panther Racing with Vítor Meira. All entries used Dallara-built chassis, Honda Indy V8 engines powered by 100-percent ethanol, and tires supplied by Firestone.

To prepare for the race, the Indy Racing League (IRL) conducted the second of its two preseason tests on February 21–22 at Homestead–Miami Speedway. Both testing sessions began at 4:00 PM EST (UTC−05:00) and ended at 10:00 PM. Dan Wheldon lapped the quickest time of the 19 participants on the first day at 214.858 mph (345.780 km/h), but crashed in turn two with an hour left. Wheldon continued to set the pace on the second day, which went without incident, with a top speed of 214.350 mph (344.963 km/h). All 19 drivers in the session were separated by about half a second.

== Practice and qualifying ==
Two practice sessions preceded the race on Saturday, both of which were held on Friday and lasted for two hours. The drivers were separated into two groups for the sessions and each allowed an hour of track time. The first practice session was led by Wheldon with a time of 25.0970 seconds, six hundredths of a second quicker than Sam Hornish Jr.; Tony Kanaan took third, Scott Dixon fourth, and Meira fifth. In the second practice session, Wheldon's time of 24.9899 seconds proved to be the quickest lap of the day thus far, with Hornish Jr., Kanaan, Fisher, and Dixon rounding out the top-five. The session was stopped twice for rain precipitating over the track, and once for Fisher running out of fuel and stopping her car on the back stretch.

During the qualifying session, held on Saturday evening, each driver was permitted to complete a maximum of two timed laps, with the fastest of their two laps determining their starting position. Wheldon earned his fifth career pole position with a time of 24.9438 seconds and was joined on the grid's front row by Hornish Jr., who was 0.0028 seconds slower ahead of his 100th start in the IndyCar Series. The Andretti Green Racing teammates Dario Franchitti, Tony Kanaan, and Marco Andretti occupied the next three positions. Dixon struggled with understeer during his qualifying attempt and took sixth, ahead of Sharp in seventh, Castroneves in eighth, Fisher in ninth, and A. J. Foyt IV in tenth. The starting lineup was completed by Meira, Tomas Scheckter, Rice, Patrick, Ed Carpenter, Simmons, Darren Manning, Matsuura, Marty Roth, and Alex Barron. The lap times of Sharp and Simmons, both of Rahal Letterman Racing, were disallowed after they failed technical inspection after qualifying and they were forced to start in the 19th and 20th positions, respectively.

=== Qualifying classification ===
Pos	No.	Driver	Team	Time	Speed	Final grid
1	10	(United Kingdom) Dan Wheldon	Chip Ganassi Racing	24.9438	214.322	1
2	6	(United States) Sam Hornish Jr.	Team Penske	24.9466	214.298	2
3	27	(United Kingdom) Dario Franchitti	Andretti Green Racing	25.0147	213.714	3
4	11	(Brazil) Tony Kanaan	Andretti Green Racing	25.0429	213.474	4
5	26	(United States) Marco Andretti	Andretti Green Racing	25.1276	212.754	5
6	9	(New Zealand) Scott Dixon	Chip Ganassi Racing	25.1301	212.733	6
7	8	(United States) Scott Sharp	Rahal Letterman Racing	25.1431	212.623	19^{1}
8	3	(Brazil) Hélio Castroneves	Team Penske	25.1459	212.599	7
9	5	(United States) Sarah Fisher	Dreyer & Reinbold Racing	25.1575	212.501	8
10	22	(United States) A. J. Foyt IV	Vision Racing	25.2160	212.008	9
11	4	(Brazil) Vítor Meira	Panther Racing	25.2443	211.771	10
12	2	(South Africa) Tomas Scheckter	Vision Racing	25.2651	211.596	11
13	15	(United States) Buddy Rice	Dreyer & Reinbold Racing	25.2707	211.549	12
14	7	(United States) Danica Patrick	Andretti Green Racing	25.2848	211.431	13
15	20	(United States) Ed Carpenter	Vision Racing	25.2975	211.325	14
16	17	(United States) Jeff Simmons	Rahal Letterman Racing	25.3240	211.104	20^{1}
17	14	(United Kingdom) Darren Manning	A. J. Foyt Racing	25.4298	210.226	15
18	55	(Japan) Kosuke Matsuura	Panther Racing	25.4355	210.179	16
19	25	(Canada) Marty Roth	Roth Racing	25.5182	209.498	17
20	98	(United States) Alex Barron	Curb/Agajanian/Beck Motorsports	25.7473	207.633	18

Notes

- ^1 – Scott Sharp and Jeff Simmons both failed post-qualifying technical inspection and were sent to the rear of the grid.

== Race ==
Weather conditions at the track were cloudy, with air temperatures at 71 °F (22 °C) and track temperatures at 74 °F (23 °C), and rainfall forced IRL officials to delay the start of the race 50 minutes from its scheduled time of 8:00 PM. Four-time Indianapolis 500 winner A. J. Foyt, who was celebrating his 50th anniversary in American open-wheel car racing, commanded the drivers to start their engines and three-time Indianapolis 500 winner Johnny Rutherford drove the pace car. Wheldon maintained his pole position advantage and pulled ahead of Hornish Jr. on the first lap. Kanaan struggled with the handling of his car and fell to seventh place in the first five laps. The first caution flag of the race was issued on lap 8 when Barron's car lost fuel pressure and came to a stop at the first turn. Kanaan, Andretti, Rice, Simmons, and Sharp made pit stops for fuel, tires, and adjustments under the caution period.

Wheldon remained on the track and led the field back up to speed at the restart on lap 14, followed by Hornish Jr. Over the next 31 laps, Wheldon's gap ahead of Hornish Jr. grew to 2.4 seconds. The first cycle of green-flag pit stops commenced with Franchitti on lap 47. Wheldon made his stop five laps later and gave up the lead to Kanaan. Matsuura passed Kanaan for the lead on the 55th lap as Kanaan made a pit stop. As Andretti retired from the race, Wheldon reclaimed the lead on lap 58 after Matsuura entered pit road. Nine laps later, moisture was seen on the track surface, prompting the second caution flag. All the leaders made stops during the caution, with Wheldon exiting pit road first and continuing to hold the lead.

Green-flag racing resumed on lap 77. Barron returned to the track five laps later as his team had alleviated his car's mechanical issue. The caution was thrown for the third time on the 92nd lap when Simmons spun backwards into the fourth-turn SAFER barrier and collected Matsuura and Foyt IV. During the leaders' pit stops under the caution, Wheldon's stop was prolonged after an air hose was caught under his car as Hornish Jr. stalled his engine; the two drivers rejoined the race in ninth and seventh, respectively. Patrick was also mandated to fall to the rear of the line of drivers by the IRL for hitting one of Franchitti's tires on pit road. Dixon benefitted from Wheldon and Hornish Jr.'s misfortunes and took the first position at the lap-109 restart, ahead of Carpenter and Meira.

As Meira overtook Carpenter for the second position, Wheldon began climbing up through the field. By lap 115, he improved to fifth, and five laps later, he moved ahead of Dixon to retake the lead. Dixon gradually fell half a second behind Wheldon by the 150th lap before the second round of green-flag pit stops commenced a lap later. On lap 155, Patrick's brakes locked as she entered pit road, causing her car to spin into the inside wall. The caution was not necessitated for the incident, although Patrick retired from the race. Wheldon and Dixon made their final stops of the race for fuel and tires a lap later, and Wheldon's quick pit stop allowed him to keep the lead. Over the final 40 laps of the race, Kanaan climbed to fifth, while Wheldon maintained the lead and earned his 12th career win and third consecutive win at Homestead, becoming the first driver in series history to win three successive races at a single track. He finished 6.4993 seconds ahead of Dixon, with Hornish Jr., Meira, and Kanaan rounding out the top-five finishers. The remaining classified finishers were Carpenter, Franchitti, Scheckter, Castroneves, Rice, Fisher, and Sharp.

=== Post-race ===
Wheldon drove into victory lane to celebrate the win with his team; he earned $129,800 for the victory. Wheldon thanked his team and described the adversities he endured throughout the race: "I think with (Chip) Ganassi Racing—this is not a sales pitch, this is the truth—we've worked very hard over the winter to try to perfect what we started last year. It's great to be at Homestead and win three in a row. I'm not sure how we've done it, because I've done it with two different teams. The win looked dominant, but anytime you have Dixon and Hornish (Jr.) around, you know it's going to be tough. Hopefully, this bodes well for the rest of the season." Second-place finisher Dixon admitted his car was not up to par with Wheldon's, stating: "We just didn't have enough speed. Dan (Wheldon) was very good over the long runs. We'd get 10 laps from the end of a stint and we'd just get a bit loose and a bit low on grip, so it was a bit of a handful. But it's great to see the team with another one-two." Hornish Jr., who finished third, had a similar sentiment to Dixon, saying: "I could stay with Dan, but as soon we got that gap I couldn't quite get there in time. It's unfortunate for the Team Penske crew."

Meira was pleased with his fourth-place result and commented: "Another great finish. This was a hard day for us, but we made the best of it. That's what we always do at Panther Racing. I knew today the Delphi car wasn't going to be good enough to win the race, but finishing fourth is a great start to the season." Carpenter also expressed contentment after finishing sixth: "I was really happy with how we finished last season, so to start up this season the way we did tonight, with running up front and inside the top ten makes me very happy. I'm thrilled for the Vision Racing team who did a great job for me." All four Andretti Green Racing drivers fought handling issues throughout the race and were left with underwhelming finishes, with Franchitti and Patrick revealing that they both felt very disappointed. The final result gave Wheldon the lead in the Drivers' Championship with 53 points. Dixon took second on 40 points, five more than Hornish Jr. in third and eight more than Meira in fourth. Kanaan, with 30 points, rounded out the top five as 16 races remained in the season.

=== Race classification ===
Pos	No.	Driver	Team	Laps	Time/Retired	Grid	Pts.
1	10	(United Kingdom) Dan Wheldon	Chip Ganassi Racing	200	1:48:06.8893	1	53^{2}
2	9	(New Zealand) Scott Dixon	Chip Ganassi Racing	200	+6.4993	6	40
3	6	(United States) Sam Hornish Jr.	Team Penske	200	+17.4754	2	35
4	4	(Brazil) Vítor Meira	Panther Racing	200	+22.5373	10	32
5	11	(Brazil) Tony Kanaan	Andretti Green Racing	200	+23.1179	4	30
6	20	(United States) Ed Carpenter	Vision Racing	199	+1 lap	14	28
7	27	(United Kingdom) Dario Franchitti	Andretti Green Racing	199	+1 lap	3	26
8	2	(South Africa) Tomas Scheckter	Vision Racing	199	+1 lap	11	24
9	3	(Brazil) Hélio Castroneves	Team Penske	199	+1 lap	7	22
10	15	(United States) Buddy Rice	Dreyer & Reinbold Racing	199	+1 lap	12	20
11	5	(United States) Sarah Fisher	Dreyer & Reinbold Racing	195	+5 laps	8	19
12	8	(United States) Scott Sharp	Rahal Letterman Racing	194	+6 laps	19	18
13	14	(United Kingdom) Darren Manning	A. J. Foyt Racing	158	Mechanical	15	17
14	7	(United States) Danica Patrick	Andretti Green Racing	154	Accident	13	16
15	25	(Canada) Marty Roth	Roth Racing	119	Handling	17	15
16	55	(Japan) Kosuke Matsuura	Panther Racing	92	Accident	16	14
17	17	(United States) Jeff Simmons	Rahal Letterman Racing	90	Accident	20	13
18	22	(United States) A. J. Foyt IV	Vision Racing	90	Accident	9	12
19	98	(United States) Alex Barron	Curb/Agajanian/Beck Motorsports	86	Handling	18	12
20	26	(United States) Marco Andretti	Andretti Green Racing	53	Mechanical	5	12

Notes

- ^2 – Includes three bonus points for leading the most laps.

== Standings after the race ==
Drivers' Championship standings
	Pos.	Driver	Points
Unchanged	1	(United Kingdom) Dan Wheldon	53
Unchanged	2	(New Zealand) Scott Dixon	40 (–13)
Unchanged	3	(United States) Sam Hornish Jr.	35 (–18)
Unchanged	4	(Brazil) Vítor Meira	32 (–21)
Unchanged	5	(Brazil) Tony Kanaan	30 (–23)
Sources:

- Note: Only the top five positions are included.

Previous race: 2006 Peak Antifreeze Indy 300	IndyCar Series; 2007 season	Next race: 2007 Honda Grand Prix of St. Petersburg
Previous race: 2006 Toyota Indy 300	Homestead Indy 300	Next race: 2008 Gainsco Auto Insurance Indy 300
