= Charlotte Curtis =

American journalist (1928–1987)

- Born: December 19, 1928; Chicago, Illinois
- Died: April 16, 1987 (aged 58)
- Education: Columbus School for Girls, Vassar College
- Occupations: Journalist, editor

Charlotte Murray Curtis (December 19, 1928 – April 16, 1987) was an American journalist, columnist and editor at The New York Times.

== Career ==
Curtis worked as a reporter and society editor for the Columbus Citizen for 11 years, and at The New York Times for 25 years. She began her career at the Times as a fashion reporter in 1961, and two years later was assigned to the "society beat," rising to editor of the Family/Style section by 1965. She transformed the traditional women's pages through her emphasis on current news and "lively writing." In 1974, she became an associate editor of the Times in charge of the Op-Ed Page, a position she held until 1982. Her name appeared on the Times masthead, the first woman to be included with the senior editors. Her column of social commentary ran from 1982 to June 1986.

At the Columbus Citizen, Curtis honed her skills as a writer, analyst and researcher, sometimes using humor "to the dismay of her subjects." While she was editor at the Times, she wrote articles for Harper's and Rolling Stone, and a book, The Rich and Other Atrocities, published by Harper and Row in 1976.

== Legacy ==
Journalist Emily Yoffe describes her as "both the first woman on the masthead of The New York Times and one of the last women to always be the only woman in the room in the world of big-time journalism", and says she was "one of those rare print journalists who are as famous as the famous people she profiled".

== Personal life ==
Curtis was born December 19, 1928, the daughter of George Morris and Lucile Atcherson Curtis, in Chicago, Illinois. She graduated from Columbus School for Girls and attended Vassar College, majoring in United States history. Curtis was married twice, first in 1950 to one Dwight L. Fullerton, whom she later divorced. In 1972 she was married to Dr. William E. Hunt, a professor and director of neurologic surgery at the College of Medicine at Ohio State University.

Curtis died of cancer on April 16, 1987, at Ohio State University Hospital at the age of 58.
