= Lucile Atcherson Curtis =

American diplomat, suffragist

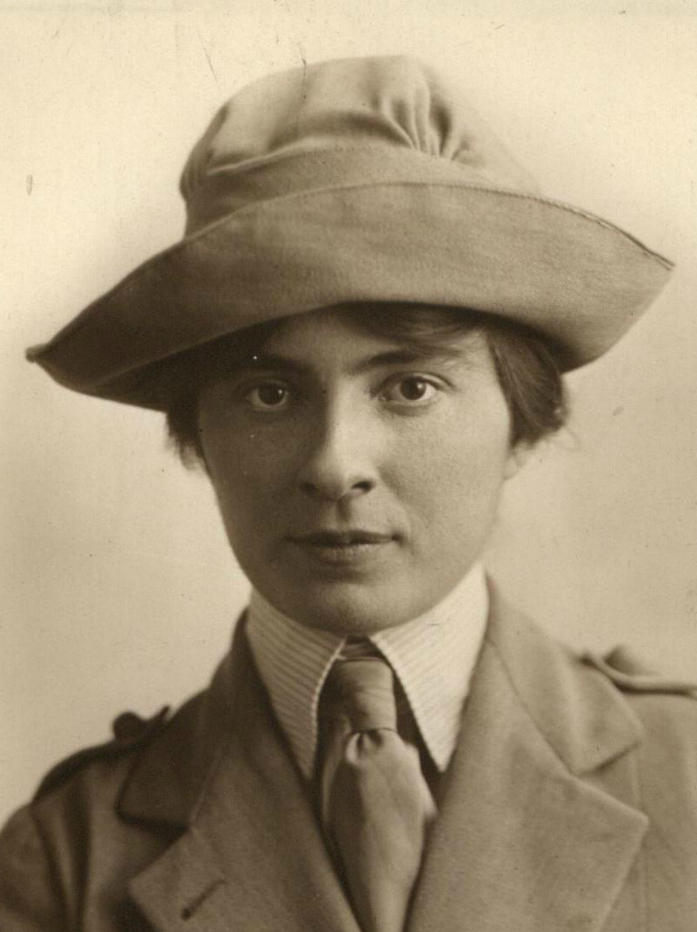
- Lucile Atcherson Curtis, 1922
- Born: Lucile Atcherson; October 11, 1894; Columbus, Ohio
- Died: March 6, 1986 (aged 91)
- Education: Columbus School for Girls; Smith College; Ohio State University; University of Chicago
- Occupation: Diplomatic Service Officer
- Spouse: George Morris Curtis (m. 1928; died 1965)

Lucile Atcherson Curtis (1894–1986) was the first woman in what became the U.S. Foreign Service. Specifically, she was the first woman appointed as a United States Diplomatic Officer or Consular Officer, in 1923; the U.S. would not establish the unified Foreign Service until 1924, at which time Diplomatic and Consular Officers became Foreign Service Officers.

== Biography ==
Curtis, née Atcherson, was born on October 11, 1894, in Columbus, Ohio. She attended Columbus School for Girls and completed her coursework there at the age of 14.

Curtis graduated from Smith College in 1913 and later did graduate and research work at Ohio State University and the University of Chicago.

She supported women's suffrage, joining a five thousand woman march through Columbus, Ohio, in 1912 in support of a constitutional amendment to give women the right to vote. She later became the first Columbus woman to join the National Woman's Party and helped organize the Ohio Suffrage Association.

In 1917 Curtis volunteered overseas with the American Fund for the French Wounded; in 1918 she was transferred to its new civilian division, called the American Committee for Devastated France, which sought to rebuild eleven villages and give medical and social services. Lucile was eventually transferred to Paris to become director of personnel there for the Committee, and in December 1919, she was given the Medaille de la Reconnaissance Francaise for her work.

In 1920 she became the first woman to apply to be tested to join what became the U.S. Foreign Service. Although she passed, and in 1922 President Warren G. Harding nominated her as the first woman in what became the U.S. Foreign Service, the Senate did not approve her appointment because its members did not think it was appropriate for a young single woman to travel overseas as a diplomat. She worked in the Department of State then, mostly in the Division of Latin-American Affairs. But after women's and political groups supported her with letters and telegrams, the Senate Committee on Foreign Relations recommended her appointment overseas and the Senate approved it in 1923. Lucile thus became a U.S. diplomat based in Bern, Switzerland, officially titled "third secretary of the legation" in Bern.

After serving in Switzerland, Lucile was assigned to the U.S. Legation in Panama in early 1927. In summer 1927, she wrote a letter to the legation's personnel chief asking when she would be promoted and noting that men had been promoted ahead of her; soon after this, the personnel board gave its members a bleak summary of her work, stating in part, "Her sex [is] a handicap to useful official friendships." She resigned later that year, although it was not because of her lack of promotion but because she disliked Panama and was in a serious relationship with her future husband.

In 1978, the State Department had a day honoring Lucile and diplomat Clifton Reginald Wharton Sr. Columbus, Ohio celebrated a day in her honor the same year.

== Personal life ==
On January 6, 1928 Lucile married George Morris Curtis with whom she had two children; Charlotte Curtis and Mary Curtis Davey. Lucile Atcherson Curtis died on March 6, 1986.

== Legacy ==
Lucile's papers are held at the Arthur and Elizabeth Schlesinger Library on the History of Women in America, a research library at the Radcliffe Institute for Advanced Study, Harvard University.
