= 2006 Peak Antifreeze Indy 300 =

Motor race held in Joliet, Illinois

(United States) 2006 Peak Antifreeze Indy 300
Race details
Race 14 of 14 in the 2006 IndyCar Series season
← Previous race	Next race →
- Map of Chicagoland Speedway
- Date: September 10, 2006
- Official name: Peak Antifreeze Indy 300 presented by Mr. Clean
- Location: Chicagoland Speedway; Joliet, Illinois, United States
- Course: Permanent racing facility 1.500 mi / 2.414 km
- Distance: 200 laps 300.000 mi / 482.803 km

Pole position
- Driver: (United States) Sam Hornish Jr. (Team Penske)
- Time: 25.4134

Fastest lap
- Driver: (United States) Sam Hornish Jr. (Team Penske)
- Time: 25.2500 (on lap 88 of 200)

Podium
- First: (United Kingdom) Dan Wheldon (Chip Ganassi Racing)
- Second: (New Zealand) Scott Dixon (Chip Ganassi Racing)
- Third: (United States) Sam Hornish Jr. (Team Penske)

The 2006 Peak Antifreeze Indy 300 presented by Mr. Clean was an IRL IndyCar Series open-wheel race that was held on September 10, 2006, in Joliet, Illinois at Chicagoland Speedway. It was the 14th and final round of the 2006 IRL IndyCar Series and the sixth running of the event. Dan Wheldon of Chip Ganassi Racing won the 200-lap race. Wheldon's teammate Scott Dixon finished second and Team Penske driver Sam Hornish Jr. finished third.

Wheldon, Dixon, Hornish Jr., and Hélio Castroneves all entered the race with a mathematical chance of winning the Drivers' Championship. Hornish Jr. won the pole position by recording the fastest lap of qualifying, although he was immediately passed by Dixon at the beginning of the race. Wheldon took the lead on the second lap and dominated most of the race while Dixon persistently trailed him in second and battled alongside him several times. With four laps remaining, Dixon nearly collided into Wheldon and briefly backed off, allowing Hornish Jr. to take second place. Dixon passed Hornish Jr. two laps later but Wheldon again defended his position for the final two laps to take the win. There were two cautions and twenty lead changes between four drivers during the race.

Wheldon's win was his second of the 2006 season and eleventh of his IndyCar Series career. The season ended with Hornish Jr. and Wheldon tied for first place in the championship standings, but the championship was awarded to Hornish Jr. by virtue of earning more wins in the season than Wheldon. Castroneves dropped to third, two points behind Hornish Jr. and Wheldon, while Dixon remained in fourth.

== Background ==
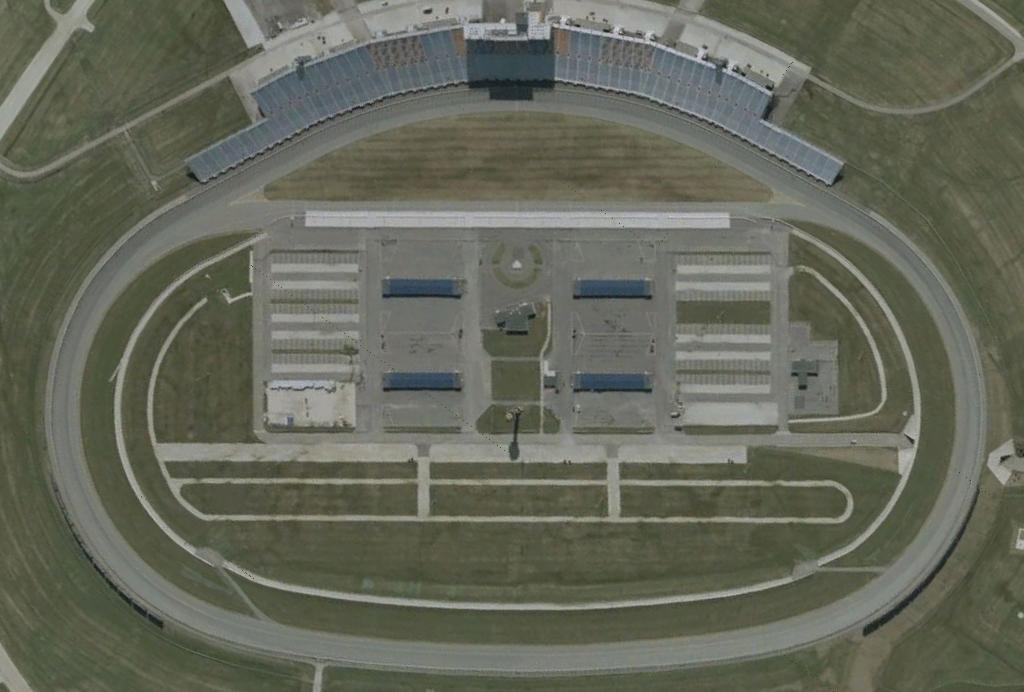
Chicagoland Speedway (pictured in 2005), where the race was held.

The Peak Antifreeze Indy 300 was the 14th and final round of the 2006 IRL IndyCar Series and the sixth edition of the event dating back to 2001. It was held on September 10, 2006, in Joliet, Illinois, United States, at Chicagoland Speedway, a four-turn 1.5 mi (2.4 km) asphalt tri-oval circuit with 18-degree banking in the turns, 11-degree banking in the front stretch, and 5-degree banking in the back stretch, and contested over 200 laps and 300 miles (480 km). Before the race, Team Penske driver Hélio Castroneves led the Drivers' Championship with 441 points, one more than teammate Sam Hornish Jr. in second. Dan Wheldon stood in third with 422 points and his Chip Ganassi Racing teammate Scott Dixon held fourth with 420 points. Vítor Meira, driving for Panther Racing, was fifth with 383 points. The top four drivers in the standings were all mathematically eligible to win the championship.

Hornish Jr., who endured a lackluster run in the preceding Indy Grand Prix of Sonoma and ceded the championship lead to Castroneves, was relieved that he remained in championship contention after being hampered by various issues throughout the season and aimed to win the race. Castroneves acknowledged Hornish Jr.'s prowess on oval tracks and promised to battle hard with him during the race, but assured that his team's ultimate goal was to prevent Chip Ganassi Racing from winning the championship. Wheldon warned he would adopt an aggressive racing strategy at Chicagoland because, according to him, he had "nothing to lose." Dixon predicted the championship would be decided by "a few inches" and evoked memories of his first championship in 2003.

Two test sessions were conducted at Chicagoland prior to the race. The first session, on August 31, was exclusively held for rookie drivers (Marco Andretti, Jeff Simmons, and Marty Roth) and Sarah Fisher, who last competed at the track in 2003. A. J. Foyt IV was the sole participant of the second session, held on September 7, as he reacquainted himself with the IndyCar Series. Foyt IV, who had not competed in an IndyCar Series race since the 2005 Toyota Indy 400, was chosen by Andretti Green Racing to replace Dario Franchitti after he suffered a concussion during qualifying for the Goodwood Revival on September 1. Team manager John Anderson explained that he was confident in Foyt IV's ability to perform well.

== Practice and qualifying ==
Two 90-minute practice sessions preceded the race on Sunday, both of which were held on Saturday and divided into two groups which received equal track time. Conditions on Saturday were warm and sunny. Dixon led the first practice session with a time of 25.2454 seconds, beating Wheldon, Castroneves, Hornish Jr., and Scott Sharp. The session was briefly paused when debris was spotted on the front stretch after Dixon and Roth made slight contact into each other. Wheldon topped the second practice session with a time of 25.2750 seconds; Hornish Jr., Dixon, Castroneves, and Meira rounded out the session's top-five quickest drivers.

Saturday afternoon's qualifying session required that each competitor complete two timed laps, with the quickest of the two determining their starting positions. Hornish Jr. earned his tenth career pole position with a time of 25.4996 seconds. He was joined on the grid's front row by Dixon, who was eight-hundredths of a second slower. Hornish Jr. later admitted he was somewhat surprised by his qualifying result due to the track's decrease in temperature. The other two championship contenders, Wheldon and Castroneves, occupied the next two positions, while Sharp qualified in fifth. The remaining top-ten positions were taken by Meira, Tomas Scheckter, Kosuke Matsuura, Buddy Rice, and Simmons; Foyt IV, Ed Carpenter, Tony Kanaan, Andretti, Danica Patrick, Fisher, Jeff Bucknum, Bryan Herta, and Roth completed the starting grid. Kanaan and Herta only completed one lap each after they experienced engine issues.

=== Qualifying classification ===
Final qualifying results
Pos.	No.	Driver	Team	Time	Speed	Grid
1	6	(United States) Sam Hornish Jr.	Team Penske	25.4134	215.319	1
2	9	(New Zealand) Scott Dixon	Chip Ganassi Racing	25.4996	214.592	2
3	10	(United Kingdom) Dan Wheldon	Chip Ganassi Racing	25.5239	214.387	3
4	3	(Brazil) Hélio Castroneves	Team Penske	25.5794	213.922	4
5	8	(United States) Scott Sharp	Fernández Racing	25.6212	213.573	5
6	4	(Brazil) Vítor Meira	Panther Racing	25.6331	213.474	6
7	2	(South Africa) Tomas Scheckter	Vision Racing	25.6872	213.024	7
8	55	(Japan) Kosuke Matsuura	Fernández Racing	25.7246	212.715	8
9	15	(United States) Buddy Rice	Rahal Letterman Racing	25.7331	212.644	9
10	17	(United States) Jeff Simmons	Rahal Letterman Racing	25.7892	212.182	10
11	27	(United States) A. J. Foyt IV	Andretti Green Racing	25.7919	212.160	11
12	20	(United States) Ed Carpenter	Vision Racing	25.8000	212.093	12
13	11	(Brazil) Tony Kanaan	Andretti Green Racing	25.8430	211.740	13
14	26	(United States) Marco Andretti	Andretti Green Racing	25.8908	211.349	14
15	16	(United States) Danica Patrick	Rahal Letterman Racing	25.9149	211.153	15
16	5	(United States) Sarah Fisher	Dreyer & Reinbold Racing	25.9410	210.940	16
17	14	(United States) Jeff Bucknum	A. J. Foyt Racing	25.9706	210.700	17
18	7	(United States) Bryan Herta	Andretti Green Racing	25.9732	210.679	18
19	25	(Canada) Marty Roth	Roth Racing	26.0928	209.713	19

== Race ==
Live television coverage of the race began at 12:30 p.m. local time (UTC−05:00) in the United States on ABC. Commentary was provided by Marty Reid, Rusty Wallace, and Scott Goodyear. Overnight rainfall forced Indy Racing League (IRL) officials to cancel the morning warm-up session. Though the track was dried in time for the race, weather conditions remained cloudy with air temperatures at 64 °F (18 °C) and track temperatures at 72 °F (22 °C). AutoZone Executive Vice President for Merchandising and Marketing Jim Shea commanded drivers to start their engines and three-time Indianapolis 500 winner Johnny Rutherford drove the pace car.

As the race began, Dixon immediately passed Hornish Jr. in the first turn and led the first lap, but lost the lead to Wheldon a lap later. Dixon drove side-by-side with Wheldon to lead the next two laps. The following lap, Wheldon nosed ahead of Dixon on his right side and held the lead until the first caution flag of the race was issued on lap 12 after Scheckter and Meira made contact and resultantly left debris at turn one. Most of the leaders made pit stops for fuel and adjustments, with the exception of Foyt IV, who assumed the lead for the first time in his IndyCar Series career. Castroneves was ordered to fall to the back of the field for exceeding the speed limit on pit road. Foyt IV led at the lap-17 restart, though he was quickly passed by Wheldon on the back stretch; Dixon also passed him for second. Castroneves had climbed to the eighth position by lap 30, and moved up to sixth ten laps later.

On the 60th lap, Andretti entered pit road after his right-rear tire flattened, kicking off the first round of green-flag pit stops. Wheldon made his stop five laps later and handed the lead to Dixon, who remained on track for an additional four laps. After pit stops concluded on lap 69, Wheldon reclaimed the lead while Hornish Jr. moved into second over Dixon. With Hornish Jr. utilizing Wheldon's draft, Wheldon only garnered a 0.2-second lead by lap 85. His gap gradually diminished as he maneuvered around lapped competitors, and on the 109th lap, Hornish Jr. drove to the left of Wheldon and took the lead. Wheldon passed him back a lap later and held it until he made a pit stop on lap 115 during the second round of green-flag pit stops. Hornish Jr. took the lead for three laps before pitting. Dixon then moved into first place until his stop on the 122nd lap, allowing Wheldon to regain the lead as pit stops ended.

The second (and final) caution was flown on lap 149 after debris was spotted in the fourth turn. All the leaders, including Wheldon, made pit stops during the caution period. Hornish Jr. had a quicker pit stop than Wheldon and led the field back up to speed at the restart on lap 156. Wheldon drove left to pass Hornish Jr. for the lead on lap 157, while Dixon moved into second a lap later. On the 167th lap, Dixon passed Wheldon to take first place. Hornish Jr. overtook Wheldon for second by lap 170, but on lap 175, Wheldon passed Hornish Jr. to regain second and raced alongside Dixon for the lead. Wheldon and Dixon traded the first two positions three times in the next five laps before Wheldon nosed ahead by less than a tenth of a second on the 181st lap. Castroneves, meanwhile, briefly challenged Hornish Jr. for third place before being embroiled in a battle between Carpenter and Kanaan, both of whom were a lap off the pace.

Though Wheldon and Dixon no longer raced alongside each other, Dixon remained in hot pursuit of Wheldon. On lap 196, Dixon closed the gap and inched closer to Wheldon until his front wing collided with Wheldon's right-rear tire, forcing Dixon to back off and give up the second position to Hornish Jr. Dixon retook second place from Hornish Jr. two laps later, but was unable to pass Wheldon, who maintained the lead in the final two laps to earn his 11th career win and second of the season. With Hornish Jr. finishing third, he had clinched his third career championship and his first since 2002. Castroneves finished fourth and was the last driver to finish on the lead lap. Carpenter finished fifth, the best result of his career thus far, ahead of Meira in sixth, Kanaan seventh, Simmons eighth, Sharp ninth, and Scheckter tenth. The remaining finishers were Matsuura, Patrick, Rice, Foyt IV, Herta, Fisher, Bucknum, and Andretti. There were two cautions and 20 lead changes among four different drivers throughout the race. Wheldon led a total of 166 laps, more than any other competitor. The average speed of 194.828 mph (313.545 km/h) made this the third-fastest race in IndyCar Series history to that point.

=== Post-race ===
"Well, I mean, it's just really been an unbelievable year for us. We came into this season and we've had some ups and downs. But, you know, obviously the highlight of the year was winning the Indianapolis 500. That's the highlight of my career. It really catapulted us back into the points championship, the hunt. Then we just kind of continued on from there. We had some problems here and there, but kind of kept our composure about ourselves. Things worked out well."

— Sam Hornish Jr. reflecting on his season.

Wheldon appeared in victory lane to celebrate his win, which earned him $125,800. In the subsequent press conference, Wheldon explained that he raced with one goal in mind: leading the most laps. Despite losing the championship, he gave his congratulations to Hornish Jr., saying: "I got to give credit to Roger Penske's organization and Sam Hornish (Jr.) They've given away less points than we have." Hornish Jr., who was awarded $1,000,000 for winning the championship, thanked his pit crew for giving him quick stops and stated that he wanted to keep up with the leaders' pace and avoid making mistakes. Regarding Wheldon and Dixon's battle for the lead, Hornish Jr. said: "I didn't think I needed to stick my nose in there. I didn't want to be part of an accident." Roger Penske, owner of Marlboro Team Penske, lauded Hornish Jr. for his performance: "There's no question that Sam had proven in '03 when he came to us that he was a great driver. To me, patience is the virtue that Sam has been developing. He's a smart race-car driver."

Dixon expressed slight frustration with Wheldon's aggressive block on lap 196, saying: "I was trying to race side-by-side, but Dan (Wheldon) had a problem with that, so whatever." During the press conference, however, he rationalized Wheldon's block and commented: "But that's racing. Coming down to the last five laps, I probably would have done the same thing." Castroneves congratulated Hornish Jr. on winning the title and regarded him as "one the best oval drivers that I know," but was irritated at Kanaan for his racing style: "Tony was trying to race me. He stayed on the bottom. I tried to pass him, and I tried to signal to him. 'Listen, give me a break. You're not going to do anything. You just make me slow.' Every time we were side by side, it was like two, three miles per hour slower." Carpenter attributed his career-best finish (at the time) to the final caution period, which allowed him to get by many of his competitors who were bunched together during the ensuing restart. He also praised his team for their efforts: "It was a lot of fun today. We ended the season on a high note. The whole team should really be proud of themselves for what they accomplished this year. I’m really proud of them.”

The final result tied Hornish Jr. and Wheldon for the Drivers' Championship as both drivers had earned a cumulative total of 475 points. Hornish Jr. was given the championship on account of having four wins in the season, two more than Wheldon. Castroneves fell to third with 473 points, while Dixon and Meira maintained the fourth and fifth positions with 460 and 411 points, respectively, to close out the season.

=== Race classification ===
Final race results
Pos.	No.	Driver	Team	Laps	Time/Retired	Grid	Points
1	10	(United Kingdom) Dan Wheldon	Chip Ganassi Racing	200	01:33:37.2662	3	53^{1}
2	9	(New Zealand) Scott Dixon	Chip Ganassi Racing	200	+0.1897	2	40
3	6	(United States) Sam Hornish Jr.	Team Penske	200	+0.2323	1	35
4	3	(Brazil) Hélio Castroneves	Team Penske	200	+2.6913	4	32
5	20	(United States) Ed Carpenter	Vision Racing	199	+1 lap	12	30
6	4	(Brazil) Vítor Meira	Panther Racing	199	+1 lap	6	28
7	11	(Brazil) Tony Kanaan	Andretti Green Racing	199	+1 lap	13	26
8	17	(United States) Jeff Simmons	Rahal Letterman Racing	199	+1 lap	10	24
9	8	(United States) Scott Sharp	Fernández Racing	199	+1 lap	5	22
10	2	(South Africa) Tomas Scheckter	Vision Racing	199	+1 lap	7	20
11	55	(Japan) Kosuke Matsuura	Fernández Racing	199	+1 lap	8	19
12	16	(United States) Danica Patrick	Rahal Letterman Racing	199	+1 lap	15	18
13	15	(United States) Buddy Rice	Rahal Letterman Racing	199	+1 lap	9	17
14	27	(United States) A. J. Foyt IV	Andretti Green Racing	198	+2 laps	11	16
15	7	(United States) Bryan Herta	Andretti Green Racing	198	+2 laps	18	15
16	5	(United States) Sarah Fisher	Dreyer & Reinbold Racing	198	+2 laps	16	14
17	14	(United States) Jeff Bucknum	A. J. Foyt Racing	198	+2 laps	17	13
18	26	(United States) Marco Andretti	Andretti Green Racing	198	+2 laps	14	12
19	25	(Canada) Marty Roth	Roth Racing	160	Electrical	19	12

Notes

- ^1 — Includes three bonus points for leading the most laps.

== Final championship standings ==
Drivers' Championship standings
+/-	Pos.	Driver	Points
1	1	(United States) Sam Hornish Jr.*	475
1	2	(United Kingdom) Dan Wheldon	475 (–0)
2	3	(Brazil) Hélio Castroneves	473 (–2)
Unchanged	4	(New Zealand) Scott Dixon	460 (–15)
Unchanged	5	(Brazil) Vítor Meira	411 (–64)
Sources:

- Note: Only the top five positions are included.
- Bold text and an asterisk indicates the national champion.

Previous race: 2006 Indy Grand Prix of Sonoma	IndyCar Series; 2006 season	Next race: 2007 XM Satellite Radio Indy 300
Previous race: 2005 Peak Antifreeze Indy 300	Peak Antifreeze Indy 300	Next race: 2007 Peak Antifreeze Indy 300
