= 2001 International Formula 3000 Championship =

Motor racing competition

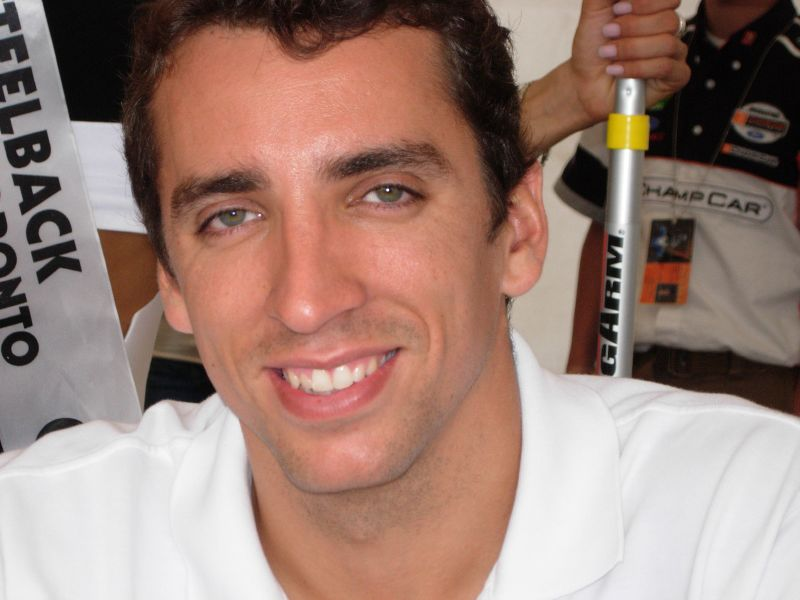
Justin Wilson (pictured in 2007), won the Drivers' Championship driving for Coca-Cola Nordic Team.

The 2001 International Formula 3000 Championship was the 35th season of the second-tier motorsport feeder championship of Formula One and the 17th season to be held under the series name. It featured the 2001 FIA International Formula 3000 Championship, a one-make motor racing series, recognised by the sport's governing body, the Fédération Internationale de l'Automobile (FIA), as the second highest class of competition of single seater racing cars. A total of 37 drivers representing 13 teams contested 12 races, starting in Brazil on 31 March and ending in Italy on 15 September as they competed for the Drivers' and Teams' Championships.

The calendar featured two significant changes from the 2000 season. They were the inclusion of a season-opening round at the Autódromo José Carlos Pace in Brazil to bring the series to South America for the first time in the modern era and a year-ending race at Italy's Autodromo Nazionale di Monza. Three teams withdrew from the championship before the season: Fortec Motorsport withdrew after they were unable to sign any suitable drivers and desired to focus on other junior series. MySap.com pulled out when owner David Brown left its parent company McLaren to join the Jordan Grand Prix team in Formula One and the World Racing Team withdrew due to a lack of financing and driver stability.

Justin Wilson of the Coca-Cola Nordic Team won three races over the course of the season and secured the Drivers' Championship with one race to go. He became the first British driver in history to win the International Formula 3000 Championship and accumulated a record-breaking 71 points. The runner-up was Super Nova Racing driver Mark Webber, who was 32 points behind Wilson, after a series of accidents eliminated him from title contention in the final third of the season. Wilson's teammate Tomáš Enge in third tied with Webber on championship points with two race victories. Coca-Cola Nordic Team took the Teams' Championship with two rounds remaining, ahead of Petrobras Junior Team and Super Nova Racing.

== Teams and drivers ==
The following teams and drivers were under contract to compete in the 2001 International Formula 3000 Championship. As the championship was a spec series, all competitors raced with a Lola B99/50 chassis with a V8 engine developed by Zytek. Teams competed with tyres supplied by Avon.

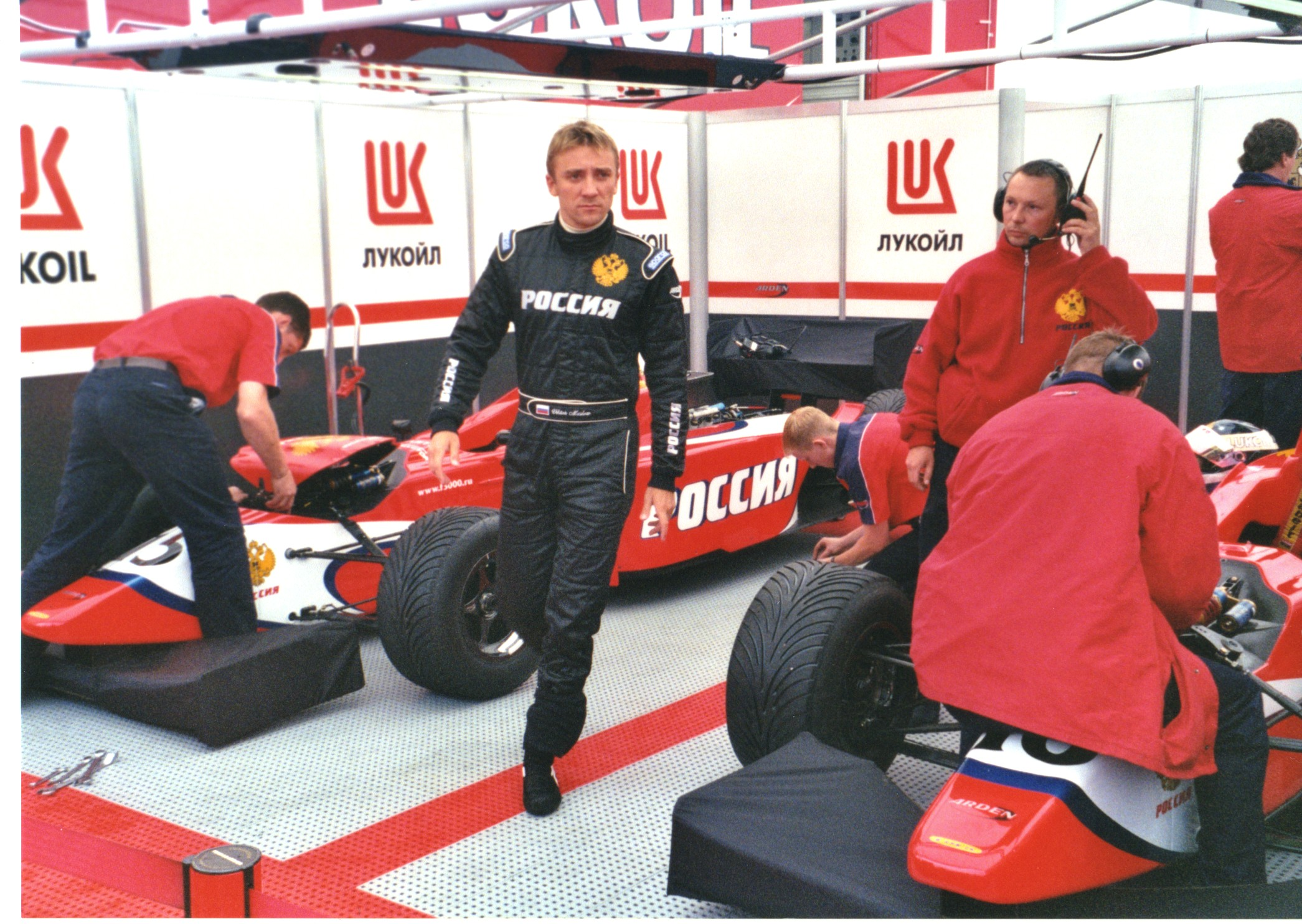
Viktor Maslov (Arden Team Russia) at the Silverstone round in July 2001

Teams and drivers competing in the 2001 season
Team	No.	Driver	Rounds
(United Kingdom) Super Nova Racing	1	(Australia) Mark Webber	All
(United Kingdom) Super Nova Racing	2	(Brazil) Mario Haberfeld	All
(Brazil) Petrobras Junior Team	3	(Brazil) Antônio Pizzonia	All
(Brazil) Petrobras Junior Team	4	(Brazil) Ricardo Sperafico	All
(Belgium) Team Astromega	5	(Indonesia) Ananda Mikola	1–3
(Belgium) Team Astromega	5	(United Kingdom) Dino Morelli	4–8
(Belgium) Team Astromega	5	(Italy) Enrico Toccacelo	9–12
(Belgium) Team Astromega	6	(Italy) Giorgio Pantano	All
(Italy) European Minardi F3000	7	(Belgium) David Saelens	1–8, 10–12
(Italy) European Minardi F3000	7	(South Africa) Tomas Scheckter	9
(Italy) European Minardi F3000	8	(Italy) Andrea Piccini	All
(United Kingdom) Coca-Cola Nordic Racing	9	(Czech Republic) Tomáš Enge	1–11
(United Kingdom) Coca-Cola Nordic Racing	9	(Czech Republic) Jaroslav Janiš	12
(United Kingdom) Coca-Cola Nordic Racing	10	(United Kingdom) Justin Wilson	All
(France) F3000 Prost Junior Team	11	(Argentina) Nicolás Filiberti	1–4
(France) F3000 Prost Junior Team	11	(France) Stéphane Sarrazin	5
(France) F3000 Prost Junior Team	11	(France) Jonathan Cochet	6–9
(France) F3000 Prost Junior Team	11	(Argentina) Norberto Fontana	10–12
(France) F3000 Prost Junior Team	12	(Italy) Gabriele Varano	1–5
(France) F3000 Prost Junior Team	12	(Hungary) Zsolt Baumgartner	6–12
(United Kingdom) Arden Team Russia	15	(United Kingdom) Darren Manning	All
(United Kingdom) Arden Team Russia	16	(Russia) Viktor Maslov	All
(Austria) Red Bull Junior Team F3000	17	(Austria) Patrick Friesacher	All
(Austria) Red Bull Junior Team F3000	18	(Spain) Antonio García	1–4
(Austria) Red Bull Junior Team F3000	18	(Brazil) Ricardo Mauricio	5–12
(Italy) Coloni F3000	19	(Italy) Fabrizio Gollin	All
(Italy) Coloni F3000	20	(Brazil) Rodrigo Sperafico	1–9
(Italy) Coloni F3000	20	(Belgium) Marc Goossens	10–12
(France) DAMS	21	(France) Sébastien Bourdais	All
(France) DAMS	22	(United States) Derek Hill	All
(Belgium) KTR	25	(Belgium) Bas Leinders	All
(Belgium) KTR	26	(Switzerland) Joël Camathias	All
(United Kingdom) Kid Jensen Racing	27	(United Kingdom) Justin Keen	1–2
(United Kingdom) Kid Jensen Racing	28	(France) Yann Goudy	1
(United Kingdom) Kid Jensen Racing	28	(Italy) Gianluca Calcagni	2
(Italy) Durango Formula	29	(Italy) Gabriele Lancieri	All
(Italy) Durango Formula	30	(Brazil) Jaime Melo	1–9
(Italy) Durango Formula	30	(Spain) Antonio García	10–12

=== Team changes ===
A total of 30 entries spread across 13 teams were initially entered into the championship with the publication of a drivers' list on 2 December 2000. MySap.com withdrew from the championship after its team principal David Brown left its parent company McLaren and moved to the Jordan team in Formula One. Car owner and former sports car driver Gabriele Rafanelli withdrew the World Racing Team (WRT) from the series to focus on the American Le Mans Series operation, tired of F3000 due to a lack of financing and driver stability. European Formula Racing ended its partnership with the Arrows Formula One team, causing team owner Paul Stoddart to re-brand the team European Minardi F3000. Fortec Motorsport were included on the initial entry list before the team withdrew from the championship because they could not locate any suitable drivers to sign and they wanted to focus on other junior series. Prost Grand Prix changed the name of its team from Gauloises Formula to F3000 Prost Junior Team after they lost sponsorship backing from the tobacco company Gauloises.

=== Driver changes ===
The 2001 season saw several driver changes. Defending series champion Bruno Junqueira left the Petrobras Junior Team and moved to Championship Auto Racing Teams (CART) to drive for Chip Ganassi Racing (CGR). His teammate Jaime Melo left the team to join Durango on a one-year contract with the option to extend by another season afterwards, partnering series debutant Gabriele Lancieri, who progressed from the Italian Formula 3000 Championship. Italian series champion Ricardo Sperafico drove the second Petrobras car; his twin brother Rodrigo Sperafico moved from the same championship to join Coloni and partnered Fabrizio Gollin. Fabrice Walfisch, who drove for Coloni and later Astromega, joined the European Touring Car Championship in 2001, and André Couto left the series to drive in a Japan-based series. Nordic Racing employed Tomáš Enge from MySap.com to replace the outgoing Kevin McGarrity.

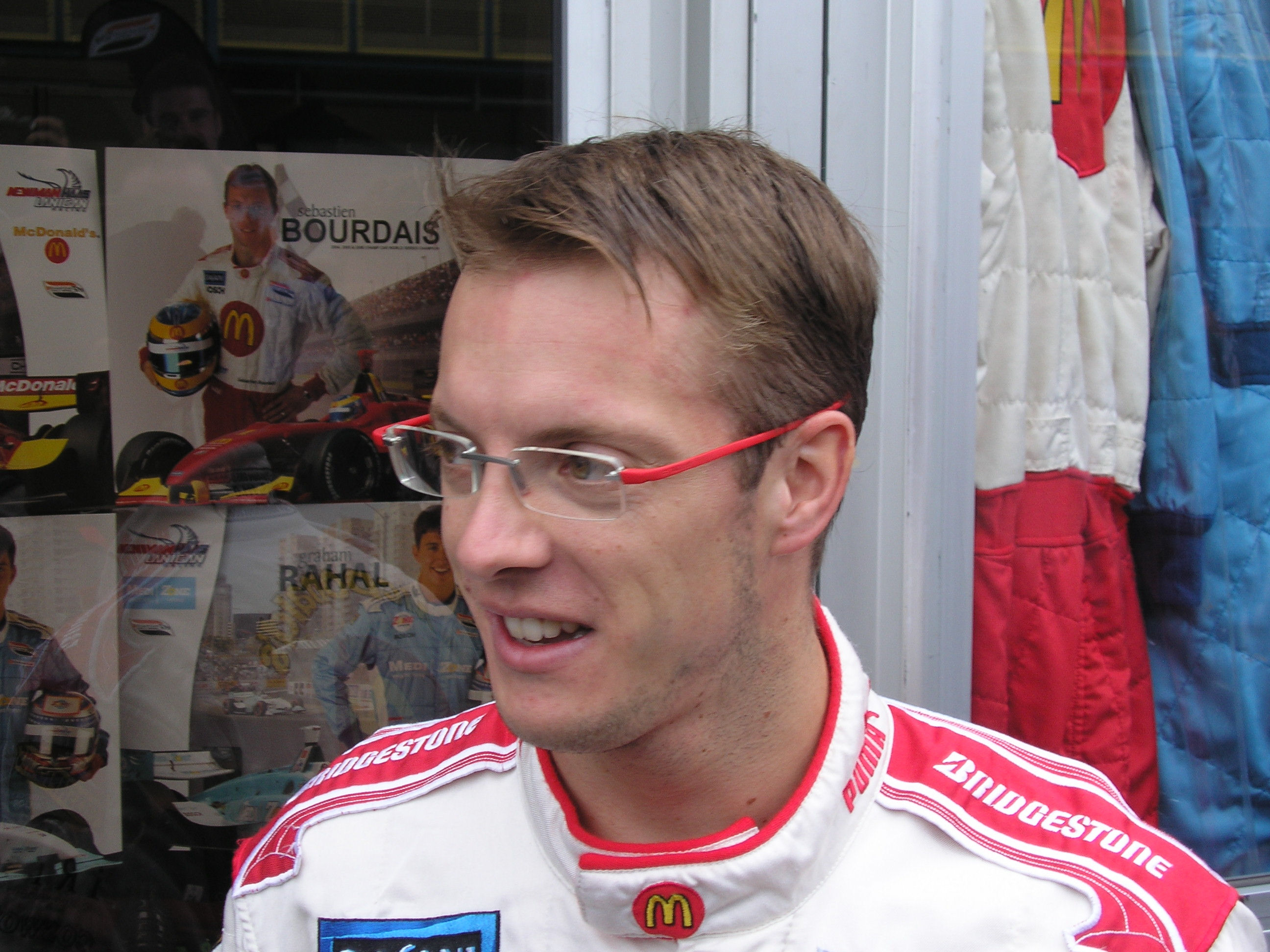
Sébastien Bourdais (pictured in 2007) joined the championship with the DAMS team

Team Astromega changed their entire line-up. They signed the German Formula Three (GF3) champion Giorgio Pantano to drive his first season in the championship and the WRT driver Ananda Mikola joined him. Driver Fernando Alonso went to Formula One to join Minardi, and Marc Goossens left the team. DAMS also had a new line-up in its team. Franck Montagny switched to the World Series by Nissan and Kristian Kolby competed in the American Indy Lights. The 1997 Barber Dodge Pro Series champion Derek Hill and the Gauloises Formula racer Sébastien Bourdais replaced them. Antonio García graduated from the World Series by Nissan to join the Red Bull Junior Team to pair with GF3 driver Patrick Friesacher. He replaced Enrique Bernoldi, who moved to the Arrows Formula One team. Super Nova Racing signed Mark Webber from European Arrows and Mário Haberfeld from Fortec. European Minardi employed David Saelens from Super Nova, to partner Andrea Piccini, who left Kid Jensen Racing (KJR) after two seasons.

Nicolas Minassian left Super Nova and the series to join CART as teammate to Junqueira at CGR. KJR released Bas Leinders and he moved to KTR to partner Joël Camathias, who transferred from the World Series by Nissan. Financial concerns meant Jeffrey van Hooydonk was unable to secure a seat in the championship and he went to drive in Belcar; his compatriot Yves Olivier and Christijan Albers of European Arrows entered the Deutsche Tourenwagen Masters. Italian F3000 competitors Gabriele Varano and Nicolás Filiberti joined the championship by signing for the Prost Junior Team. KJR employed the Formula Palmer Audi driver Justin Keen and Yann Goudy from Italian F3000 to fill the seats vacated by Piccini and Leinders.

==== Mid-season driver changes ====
KJR replaced Yann Goudy with Gianluca Calcagni for the Autodromo Enzo e Dino Ferrari round. The team later withdrew from the championship before the Circuit de Catalunya event due to ownership problems and Calcagni driving for them in Imola, which created tension with the series' governing body. Shortly before the A1 Ring round, Ananda Mikola's sponsorship money did not arrive in time at Astromega and a poor performance resulted in Astromega replacing him with Dino Morelli for the next four events. Enrico Toccacelo later drove in Morelli's place for the rest of the season.

Stéphane Sarrazin made a one-off appearance for Prost at the Monaco round as a replacement for Filiberti, who was absent due to "personal issues". Prost later replaced the underperforming Filiberti with Zsolt Baumgartner for the rest of the year from the Nürburgring round and the French Formula Three champion and Porsche Supercup driver Jonathan Cochet drove Variano's car. Prost backed the initiative of one of its major sponsors to promote Latin American drivers in its team and the GF3 series winner Norberto Fontana was drafted in place of Cochet for the season's final three rounds. Before the Monaco round, Red Bull terminated García's contract, and they replaced him with Ricardo Maurício.

European Minardi was represented by the Formula Nippon racer and Jaguar test driver Tomas Scheckter in one of its cars for the Hockenheimring race after Saelens sustained an injury in an accident during the Silverstone event. Rodrigo Sperafico ended his campaign after the same event and was replaced at Coloni by Goossens for the rest of the season with new sponsorship brought to them. García replaced Melo at Durango from the Hungaroring round on, and GF3 driver Jaroslav Janiš drove Enge's Nordic car at the season-ending Monza event, while Enge substituted for Luciano Burti at the Prost Formula One team after the latter was injured at the Belgian Grand Prix.

== Season calendar ==
A 12-race season calendar was released by the Fédération Internationale de l'Automobile (FIA; the series' governing body) at a meeting of the FIA World Motor Sport Council in Seville on 4 October 2000. All events were held in support on the Saturday of Formula One races. The series expanded from 10 to 12 races: a South American event to begin the season was at the Autódromo José Carlos Pace in Brazil for the series' first race to be held outside of Europe in the modern era. The season-ending round was held at Italy's Autodromo Nazionale di Monza. Drivers and teams had most of June off as the Toyota Atlantic Championship supported the Canadian Grand Prix.

Schedule of events and results
Round	Circuit	Date	Laps	Pole Position	Fastest Lap	Winner	Winning team	Report
1	(Brazil) Autódromo José Carlos Pace	31 March	35	(Brazil) Jaime Melo Jr.	(Brazil) Antônio Pizzonia	(United Kingdom) Justin Wilson	(United Kingdom) Coca-Cola Nordic Racing	Report
2	(Italy) Autodromo Enzo e Dino Ferrari	15 April	31	(Australia) Mark Webber	(Australia) Mark Webber	(Australia) Mark Webber	(United Kingdom) Super Nova Racing	Report
3	(Spain) Circuit de Catalunya	28 April	32	(United Kingdom) Justin Wilson	(United Kingdom) Justin Wilson	(Czech Republic) Tomáš Enge	(United Kingdom) Coca-Cola Nordic Racing	Report
4	(Austria) A1 Ring	13 May	35	(France) Sébastien Bourdais	(Italy) Giorgio Pantano	(United Kingdom) Justin Wilson	(United Kingdom) Coca-Cola Nordic Racing	Report
5	Circuit de Monaco	26 May	45	(Australia) Mark Webber	(Australia) Mark Webber	(Australia) Mark Webber	(United Kingdom) Super Nova Racing	Report
6	(Germany) Nürburgring	23 June	33	(Czech Republic) Tomáš Enge	(Italy) Giorgio Pantano	(Czech Republic) Tomáš Enge	(United Kingdom) Coca-Cola Nordic Racing	Report
7	(France) Circuit de Nevers Magny-Cours	30 June	36	(Czech Republic) Tomáš Enge	(Australia) Mark Webber	(Australia) Mark Webber	(United Kingdom) Super Nova Racing	Report
8	(United Kingdom) Silverstone Circuit	14 July	30	(Czech Republic) Tomáš Enge	(France) Sébastien Bourdais	(France) Sébastien Bourdais	(France) DAMS	Report
9	(Germany) Hockenheimring	28 July	22	(Brazil) Ricardo Sperafico	(Czech Republic) Tomáš Enge	(Brazil) Antônio Pizzonia	(Brazil) Petrobras Junior Team	Report
10	(Hungary) Hungaroring	19 August	38	(United Kingdom) Justin Wilson	(Italy) Giorgio Pantano	(United Kingdom) Justin Wilson	(United Kingdom) Coca-Cola Nordic Racing	Report
11	(Belgium) Circuit de Spa-Francorchamps	1 September	22	(Brazil) Ricardo Sperafico	(Brazil) Mario Haberfeld	(Brazil) Ricardo Sperafico	(Brazil) Petrobras Junior Team	Report
12	(Italy) Autodromo Nazionale Monza	15 September	24	(Brazil) Antônio Pizzonia	(Brazil) Antônio Pizzonia	(Italy) Giorgio Pantano	(Belgium) Team Astromega	Report

== Regulation and sporting changes ==
=== Technical changes ===
Cars were required to have their wheels attached to their primary structures by means of a single tether for each wheel to prevent them from becoming detached in case of an accident. They also had 2 mm (0.079 in) thick anti-intrusion panels installed onto the monocoque sides.

=== Sporting changes ===
Teams who finished 12th or higher in the 2000 International Formula 3000 Teams' Championship were granted automatic entry into the 2001 series. The final three slots were allocated to new entries or those who had won national Formula 3000 series. Had there been not enough entries via that process, the final three teams in the 2000 season received invitations to compete in the order they finished in the championship. The time for a practice session was lengthened, two 45-minute qualifying sessions held in late afternoon took place the day before the event and the overall race distance was decreased to 150 km (93 mi).

== Season report ==
=== Pre-season ===
The first official pre-season test took place at the Autodromo Enzo e Dino Ferrari from 14 to 15 February 2001. The two days saw Wilson lap fastest at 1 minute, 37.850 seconds and he later damaged the rear of his car in a collision with a tyre wall. Fernando Alonso helped Minardi's Formula 3000 team with chassis setup and provided its two drivers with a performance benchmark. A second official pre-season test was held at the Silverstone Circuit between 12 and 13 March 2001. Bourdais led overall for DAMS with a 1 minute, 36.326 seconds lap in variable weather.

=== Opening rounds ===
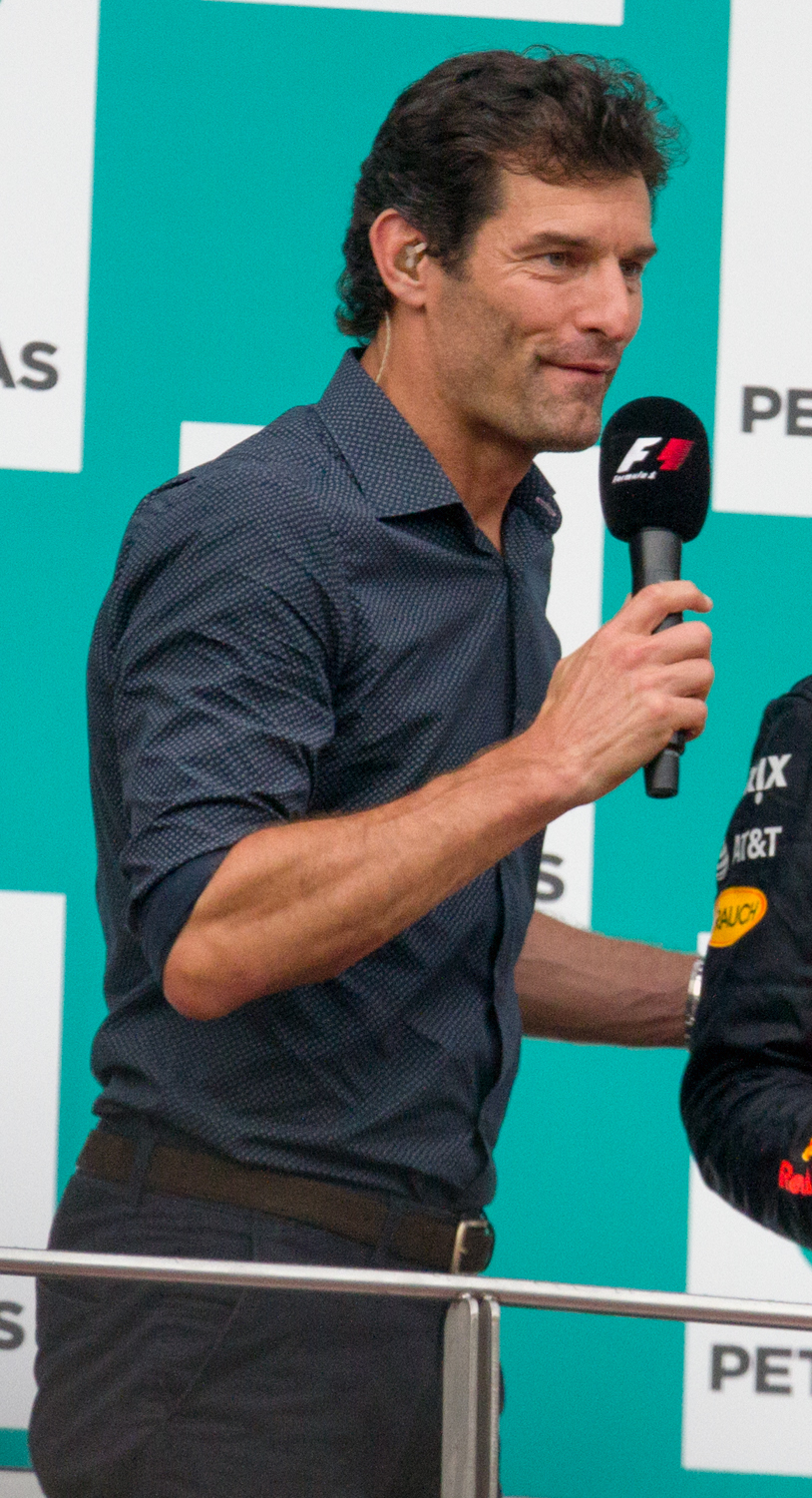
Mark Webber (pictured in 2017) finished second in the Drivers' Championship with three wins and 39 points.

The season began in Brazil. Brazilian drivers took the first four positions in qualifying with Melo claiming pole position for the first time in his career from Ricardo Sperafico, Rodrigo Sperafico and Pizzonia. The stewards neutralised the race on lap one with the safety car to clear the track when Pizzonia swerved to avoid Ricardo Sperafico's vehicle; the latter swerved to avoid other competitors, causing him to spin and crash into the barrier at the bottom of the Senna S chicane. Melo slowed sharply and allowed Pizzonia, Rodrigo Sperafico and Enge to pass him under safety car conditions. At the lap four restart, Wilson overtook Melo into the first corner, and moved into first when Pizzonia, Rodrigo Sperafico and Enge each incurred ten-second stop-and-go penalties for their earlier transgressions. Wilson led the rest of the race to win in motor racing for the first time since the 1998 Formula Palmer Audi, and was the first British driver to win in International Formula 3000 since Jamie Davies won at the Autodromo di Pergusa in the 1997 season. He lost control of his car afterwards and avoided hitting the pit lane wall. Webber, the pre-season favourite, took second from Melo in third, who had engine problems. The stewards later imposed a 25-second time penalty on Webber for passing David Saelens before the start/finish line after the safety car entered the pit lane for the restart. He moved from second to seventh.

Webber took his first Formula 3000 pole position in qualifying for the Imola round by leading both sessions with Patrick Friesacher second and Darren Manning third. He led every lap of the race to take his first win of the season after he took painkillers to ease the effects of a broken rib. The victory drew him to within one point of Wilson. A crash for Varano after losing control on the kerbs on the exit of the Tamburello chicane caused him to become dizzy and prompted the safety car's deployment. In an accordion effect behind the safety car, Hill made contact with the rear of Calcagni's car, who had turned to the right to avoid hitting slower cars ahead of him. Both drivers avoided hitting marshals tending to Varano. Nordic locked out the front row for the first time at the following race in Spain with Wilson on pole position and his teammate Enge second. Enge passed Wilson at the start of the race at the first turn and maintained the lead throughout a processional round for his second Formula 3000 victory. Enge passed Webber for second in the drivers' championship and was one point behind his teammate Wilson. An error from Wilson allowed Bas Leinders to pass him for second.

The A1 Ring in Austria hosted the fourth round of the 2001 championship. Wet weather affected the second qualifying session and a lap from Sébastien Bourdais in the first session was fast enough to earn him the second pole position of his career. A first-lap collision between Bourdais and Friesacher at Castrol Kurve corner caused eight cars to retire and allowed Leinders to move into the lead, just as Wilson progressed to second. After a safety car period to clear the area, Wilson passed Leinders on the outside on the fifth lap and he held off the latter to win for the second time in International Formula 3000. The victory further extended Wilson's championship lead to seven points over his Nordic teammate Enge. During qualifying at Monaco Webber took a second pole position of 2001 despite crashing at the outside of La Rascasse turn late in the second session in a desire to better his lap. Webber held off Wilson at the start of the race and led every lap for his second victory of the year by eight-tenths of a second. Webber thus overtook Enge for second position in the drivers' championship. Two safety car periods for a first lap five-car accident at a hairpin and for separate crashes involving Darren Manning and Antônio Pizzonia slowed the race.

=== Mid-season ===
Heading into round six, Wilson led Webber in second by eleven points and was another two points in front of the third-placed Enge. Pole position for the Nürburgring event was taken by Enge after a duel with Webber and Ricardo Sperafico. Wilson was down in seventh place after he ran wide at a chicane. Enge was unchallenged throughout a noncompetitive race and achieved his second win of the season. The result moved Enge past Webber and into second position in the championship. He stood three points behind his teammate Wilson, who spun into a gravel trap and subsequently retired with a sheared peg on the front-left wheel. One week later at the Circuit de Nevers Magny-Cours in France, Enge carried his form over from the Nürburgring round to qualify on pole position for the second race in succession on his second lap of the session with no slower traffic to impede him. Webber, Patrick Friesacher and Wilson were in positions two to four. Webber overtook Enge at the first corner to take the lead and Wilson passed Freisacher for third position. Webber pulled away from the rest of the field to claim victory and drew to within one championship point of Wilson, who finished second after Enge ran wide at a hairpin on the final lap.

Enge took another pole position when he set the fastest lap, ahead of his teammate Wilson and Bourdais at the Silverstone round in the United Kingdom. A major airborne accident at Becketts corner involving Saelens in qualifying caused a long stoppage to allow for him to be extricated from his car with FIA doctor Sid Watkins supervising. Saelens was transported to Northampton General Hospital and was withdrawn from the race with ninth vertebrae and wrist ligament damage. In the race, the Nordic cars of Enge and Wilson collided at Stowe turn on the fourth lap. Wilson ran wide onto the gravel and this elevated Bourdais to second position. A brief rain shower on lap nineteen caused Enge to go onto the gravel at Copse corner and Bourdais took the lead. He held off Wilson to take his first Formula 3000 victory as Enge's engine cut out on the final lap and gave his compatriot Antônio Pizzonia third.

=== Final rounds ===
Ricardo Sperafico beat Wilson by 0.071 seconds to achieve the first pole position of his career in the next round at the Hockenheimring. Sperafico had excess wheelspin off the line; he kept the lead by blocking Wilson, who lost second place to his teammate Enge. Wilson and Pizzonia subsequently took first and second before the latter passed the former on lap three. Pizzonia lead the rest of the race to win for the first time in the series. A second-place result for Wilson and a non-finish for Webber after hitting the rear of Darren Manning's car increased his lead to ten points in the championship. The season resumed three weeks later at the Hungaroring in Hungary. Wilson emerged ahead of Webber in qualifying with pole position, and broke away from the start as Webber had less grip and fell behind Enge and Mauricio. Enge delayed Webber until he made an error at the final turn and the latter passed him. This resulted in contact between Enge and Webber and the latter was imposed a ten-second stop-and-go penalty dropping him to eleventh. With four laps remaining, Webber beached his car upon a kerb and promoted Bourdais to third. Wilson took his third career victory with a margin of 5 1/2 seconds over Mauricio. He extended his championship lead over Webber to 20 points and Nordic won the Teams' Championship with two races to go.

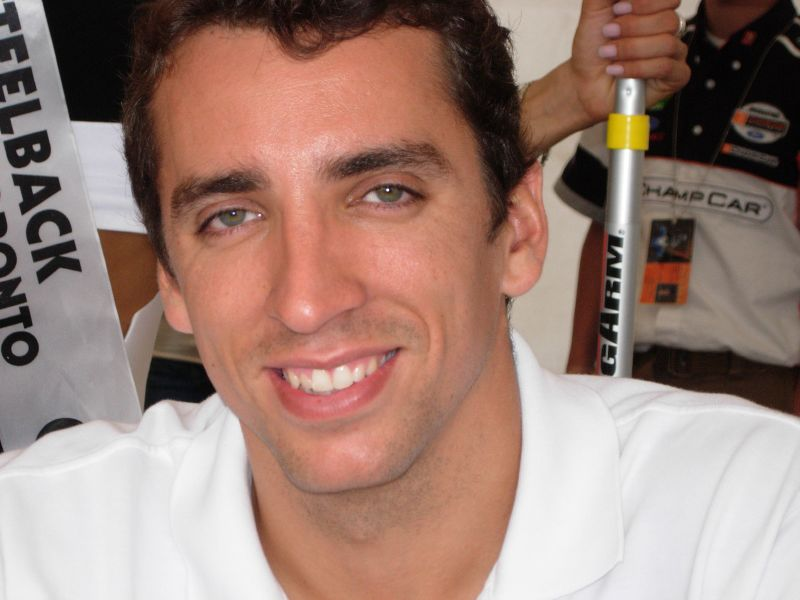
Justin Wilson (pictured in 2007) won three races and scored 71 championship points to become the first British driver in history to win the International Formula 3000 Championship.

Going into the Spa-Francorchamps round, Webber needed to win the final two races and for Wilson not to score any points to win the drivers' championship on countback with more race victories. Wilson required a sixth-place result in either race to secure the title regardless of where Webber finished. Petrobras took the first two positions in qualifying with Ricardo Sperafico on pole position and his teammate Antônio Pizzonia second. Wilson and Webber could only manage third and fifth respectively. The race began in inclement weather and the safety car was used for two laps to allow competitors to familiarise themselves with the wet track. An accident for Webber at Eau Rouge corner early on saw his car destroyed and him taken to a hospital in Verviers for a precautionary x-ray scan that discovered knee ligament damage and no fractured bones. Wilson finished second to clinch the drivers' title with one race remaining as Sperafico led every lap of the event to achieve his first career win. Wilson was the first British driver in history to win the International Formula 3000 Championship.

At the season-ending Autodromo Nationale di Monza race, a deluge caused localised flooding and strong winds blowing natural debris onto the circuit forced the postponement of qualifying. Qualifying was reformatted as a solitary 20-minute session on Saturday afternoon and the race began half an hour later than scheduled. Pizzonia qualified on pole position for the first time in his career and he was joined on the grid's front row by Wilson in second. The start was aborted twice and delayed for 23 minutes because several drivers stalled their cars on the grid. Pantano emerged a Formula 3000 race winner for the first time in his career after he overcame being put onto the grass by Pizzonia at the start, a manoeuvre which entailed a ten-second stop-and-go penalty for the latter. Wilson went on to finish second and Ricardo Sperafico placed third.

Wilson finished on 71 points with Webber and Enge tied for second position with 39 points each. He eclipsed the record of Juan Pablo Montoya from the 1998 season with the most points accumulated in an International Formula 3000 season, which he kept until Björn Wirdheim improved on it en route to winning the 2003 championship.

== Results and standings ==
=== Points system ===
Points were awarded to the top six classified finishers in every race, using the following structure:

Position	**1st**	**2nd**	**3rd**	**4th**	**5th**	**6th**	**Ref**
Points	10	6	4	3	2	1	

=== Drivers' Championship ===
Pos	Driver	INT (Brazil)	IMO (Italy)	CAT (Spain)	A1R (Austria)	MON (Monaco)	NÜR (Germany)	MAG (France)	SIL (United Kingdom)	HOC (Germany)	HUN (Hungary)	SPA (Belgium)	MNZ (Italy)	Points
1	(United Kingdom) Justin Wilson	1	6	**3**	1	2	Ret	2	2	2	**1**	2	2	71
2	(Australia) Mark Webber	7	**1**	7	Ret	**1**	2	1	4	Ret	Ret	Ret	Ret	39
3	(Czech Republic) Tomáš Enge	12	3	1	3	7	**1**	**3**	**5**	5	11	4		39
4	(France) Sébastien Bourdais	3	Ret	11	**Ret**	4	8	6	1	4	3	6	9	26
5	(Brazil) Ricardo Sperafico	Ret	14	19	Ret	5	3	13	11	**3**	7	**1**	3	24
6	(Brazil) Antônio Pizzonia	9	4	6	4	Ret	6	10	3	1	Ret	8	**Ret**	22
7	(Belgium) Bas Leinders	10	9	2	2	Ret	11	Ret	8	6	6	7	4	17
8	(Brazil) Ricardo Mauricio					6	5	Ret	7	17	2	3	6	14
9	(Italy) Giorgio Pantano	Ret	11	9	15	Ret	21	8	Ret	7	5	11	1	12
10	(Belgium) David Saelens	4	Ret	5	9	Ret	4	9	DNS			Ret	5	10
11	(United Kingdom) Darren Manning	8	2	20	Ret	Ret	7	5	6	Ret	Ret	Ret	Ret	9
12	(Brazil) Jaime Melo Jr.	**2**	Ret	21	5	11	13	14	12	12				8
13	(Austria) Patrick Friesacher	Ret	5	8	Ret	13†	10	4	19	11	4	10	Ret	8
14	(France) Stéphane Sarrazin					3								4
15	(Brazil) Mario Haberfeld	Ret	Ret	4	Ret	12†	Ret	7	15	Ret	Ret	19	13	3
16	(Belgium) Marc Goossens										Ret	5	7	2
17	(Switzerland) Joël Camathias	5	15	18	Ret	Ret	18	17	17	9	13	15	15	2
18	(Italy) Andrea Piccini	11	Ret	13	6	Ret	9	Ret	Ret	Ret	8	Ret	8	1
19	(Italy) Fabrizio Gollin	6	8	17	Ret	8	20	12	10	Ret	Ret	12	10	1
20	(Brazil) Rodrigo Sperafico	13	7	22	8	9	12	15	14	8				0
21	(United Kingdom) Dino Morelli				7	Ret	Ret	20	Ret					0
22	(Italy) Gabriele Lancieri	Ret	13	Ret	12	Ret	14	13	10	9	9	14	Ret	0
23	(France) Jonathan Cochet						16	11	9	15				0
24	(United States) Derek Hill	14	Ret	16	13	Ret	15	16	Ret	Ret	12	9	12	0
25	(Russia) Viktor Maslov	Ret	10	12	11	10	17	18	16	14	Ret	18	14	0
26	(Spain) Antonio García	Ret	16	10	Ret						10	16	11	0
27	(Argentina) Nicolás Filiberti	20	17	14	10									0
28	(United Kingdom) Justin Keen	16	12											0
29	(Hungary) Zsolt Baumgartner						19	Ret	18	16	Ret	13	17	0
30	(Italy) Enrico Toccacelo									13	Ret	17	Ret	0
31	(Italy) Gabriele Varano	15	Ret	15	14	Ret								0
32	(Argentina) Norberto Fontana										14	Ret	Ret	0
33	(Czech Republic) Jaroslav Janiš												16	0
34	(Indonesia) Ananda Mikola	17	Ret	23										0
35	(France) Yann Goudy	18												0
–	(Italy) Gianluca Calcagni		Ret											0
–	(South Africa) Tomas Scheckter									Ret				0
Pos	Driver	INT (Brazil)	IMO (Italy)	CAT (Spain)	A1R (Austria)	MON (Monaco)	NÜR (Germany)	MAG (France)	SIL (United Kingdom)	HOC (Germany)	HUN (Hungary)	SPA (Belgium)	MNZ (Italy)	Points

Colour	Result
Gold	Winner
Silver	Second place
Bronze	Third place
Green	Points classification
Blue	Non-points classification
Blue	Non-classified finish (NC)
Purple	Retired, not classified (Ret)
Red	Did not qualify (DNQ)
Red	Did not pre-qualify (DNPQ)
Black	Disqualified (DSQ)
White	Did not start (DNS)
White	Withdrew (WD)
White	Race cancelled (C)
Blank	Did not practice (DNP)
Blank	Did not arrive (DNA)
Blank	Excluded (EX)

**Bold** — Pole
Italics — Fastest lap

^{†} Driver did not finish the Race but was classified as he completed over 90% of the race distance.

=== Teams' Championship ===
Pos	Team	Nº	INT (Brazil)	IMO (Italy)	CAT (Spain)	A1R (Austria)	MON (Monaco)	NÜR (Germany)	MAG (France)	SIL (United Kingdom)	HOC (Germany)	HUN (Hungary)	SPA (Belgium)	MNZ (Italy)	Points
1	(United Kingdom) Coca-Cola Nordic Racing	9	1	6	**3**	1	2	Ret	2	2	2	**1**	2	2	110
1	(United Kingdom) Coca-Cola Nordic Racing	10	12	3	1	3	7	**1**	**3**	**5**	5	11	4	16	110
2	(Brazil) Petrobras Junior Team	3	9	4	6	4	Ret	6	10	3	1	Ret	8	**Ret**	46
2	(Brazil) Petrobras Junior Team	4	Ret	14	19	Ret	5	3	13	11	**3**	7	**1**	3	46
3	(United Kingdom) Super Nova Racing	1	7	**1**	7	Ret	**1**	2	1	4	Ret	Ret	Ret	Ret	42
3	(United Kingdom) Super Nova Racing	2	Ret	Ret	4	Ret	12	Ret	7	15	Ret	Ret	19	13	42
4	(France) DAMS	21	3	Ret	11	**Ret**	4	8	6	1	4	3	6	9	26
4	(France) DAMS	22	14	Ret	16	13	Ret	15	16	Ret	Ret	12	9	12	26
5	(Austria) Red Bull Junior Team F3000	17	Ret	5	8	Ret	13	10	4	19	11	4	10	Ret	22
5	(Austria) Red Bull Junior Team F3000	18	Ret	16	10	Ret	6	5	Ret	7	17	2	3	6	22
6	(Belgium) KTR	25	10	9	2	2	Ret	11	Ret	8	6	6	7	4	19
6	(Belgium) KTR	26	5	15	18	Ret	Ret	18	17	17	9	13	15	15	19
7	(Belgium) Team Astromega	5	17	Ret	23	7	Ret	Ret	20	Ret	13	Ret	17	Ret	12
7	(Belgium) Team Astromega	6	Ret	11	9	15	Ret	21	8	Ret	7	5	11	1	12
8	(Italy) European Minardi F3000	7	4	Ret	5	9	Ret	4	9	DNS	Ret	**2**	Ret	5	11
8	(Italy) European Minardi F3000	8	11	Ret	13	6	Ret	9	Ret	Ret	Ret	8	Ret	8	11
9	(United Kingdom) Arden Team Russia	14	8	2	20	Ret	Ret	7	5	6	Ret	Ret	Ret	Ret	9
9	(United Kingdom) Arden Team Russia	15	Ret	10	12	11	10	17	18	16	14	Ret	18	14	9
10	(Italy) Durango Formula	29	Ret	13	Ret	12	Ret	14	13	10	9	9	14	Ret	8
10	(Italy) Durango Formula	30	**2**	Ret	21	5	11	13	14	12	12	10	16	11	8
11	(France) F3000 Prost Junior Team	11	20	17	14	10	3	16	11	9	15	14	Ret	Ret	4
11	(France) F3000 Prost Junior Team	12	15	Ret	15	14	Ret	19	Ret	18	16	Ret	13	17	4
12	(Italy) Coloni F3000	19	6	8	17	Ret	8	20	12	10	Ret	Ret	12	10	3
12	(Italy) Coloni F3000	20	13	7	22	8	9	12	15	14	8	Ret	5	7	3
13	(United Kingdom) Kid Jensen Racing	27	16	12											0
13	(United Kingdom) Kid Jensen Racing	28	18	Ret											0

Colour	Result
Gold	Winner
Silver	Second place
Bronze	Third place
Green	Points classification
Blue	Non-points classification
Blue	Non-classified finish (NC)
Purple	Retired, not classified (Ret)
Red	Did not qualify (DNQ)
Red	Did not pre-qualify (DNPQ)
Black	Disqualified (DSQ)
White	Did not start (DNS)
White	Withdrew (WD)
White	Race cancelled (C)
Blank	Did not practice (DNP)
Blank	Did not arrive (DNA)
Blank	Excluded (EX)

**Bold** — Pole
Italics — Fastest lap

== See also ==
- 2001 Euro Formula 3000 season
