= 2001 Spa-Francorchamps F3000 round =

- Race 11 of 12 in the 2001 International Formula 3000 Championship
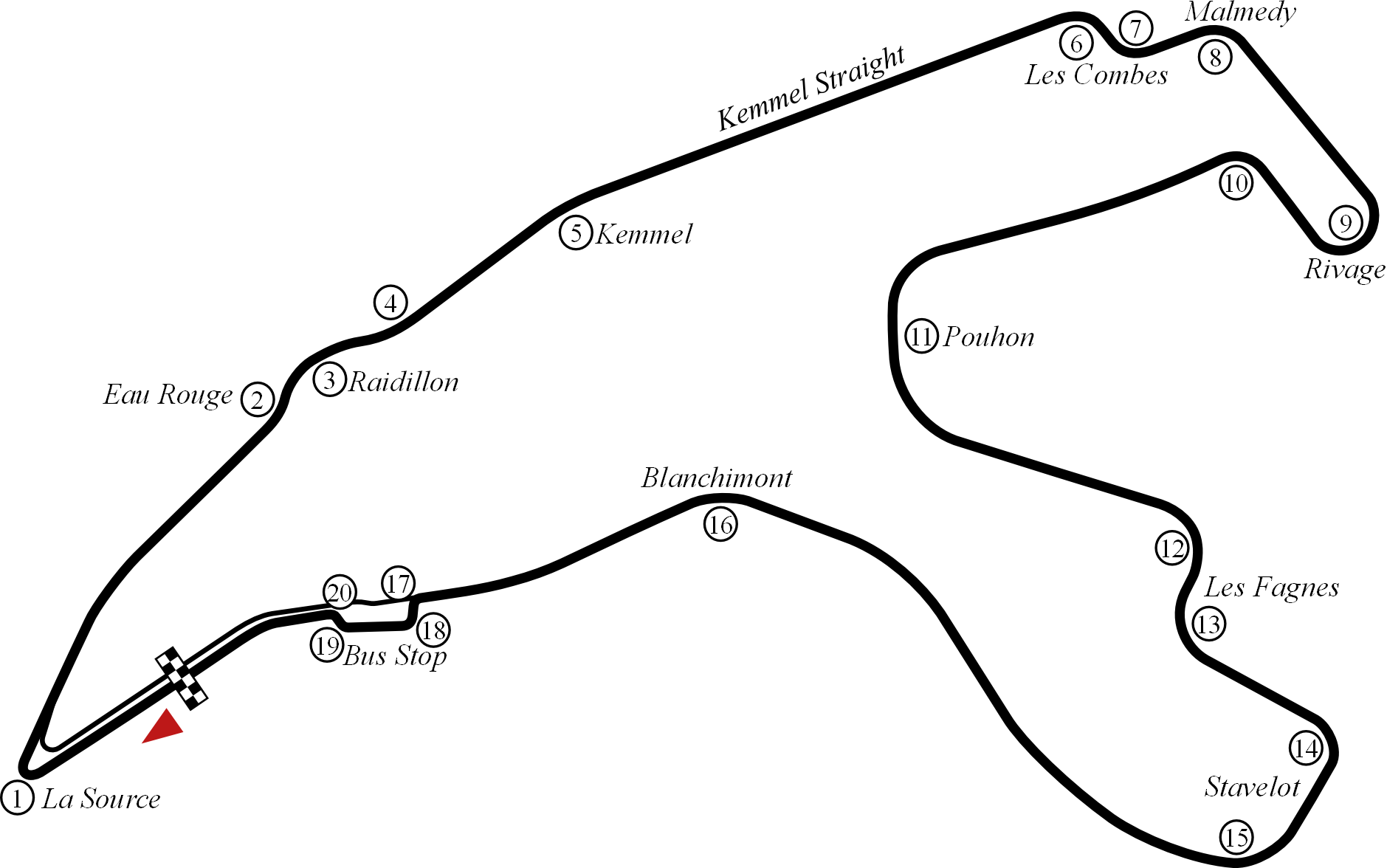

Race details
- Date: 1 September 2001
- Course: Permanent racing facility
- Course length: 6.968 km (4.330 miles)
- Distance: 22 laps, 153.279 km (95.260 miles)

Pole position
Driver	(Brazil) Ricardo Sperafico	Petrobras Junior Team
- Time: 2:13.129

Fastest lap
Driver	(Brazil) Mário Haberfeld	Super Nova Racing
- Time: 2:08.781 on lap 21

Podium
First	(Brazil) Ricardo Sperafico	Petrobras Junior Team
Second	(United Kingdom) Justin Wilson	Coca-Cola Nordic Racing
Third	(Brazil) Ricardo Maurício	Red Bull Junior Team F3000

The 2001 Spa-Francorchamps F3000 round was a motor racing event held on 1 September 2001 at the Circuit de Spa-Francorchamps, Belgium. It was the eleventh round of the 2001 International Formula 3000 Championship, and was held in support of the 2001 Belgian Grand Prix.

== Race report ==
Entering the weekend, Justin Wilson led the championship by 20 points from Mark Webber, with 20 points remaining. Qualifying was held in changing weather, with the best conditions coming at the end of the session. Petrobras Junior Team qualified one-two, with Ricardo Sperafico ahead of Antônio Pizzonia. Wilson qualified in third, but would be without the support of teammate Tomáš Enge at the start of the race, as he qualified ninth, with Webber between them in fifth.

The race was held in damp conditions, so the formation and first laps were completed under safety car conditions. Webber had lowered the rideheight of his car on the grid, a decision that led to him crashing in Raidillon on lap two; his car was destroyed, although he walked away with only a minor ankle injury. Pizzonia then spun behind the following safety car and dropped down the field to 15th, but was able to continue.

The race restarted on lap five, and Darren Manning briefly took third place from Ricardo Maurício, but hit a bollard later on the lap and had to replace his front wing. Two laps later, Enge overtook Marc Goossens for fourth. Further back, European Minardi F3000 teammates David Saelens and Andrea Piccini collided, eliminating both drivers from the race. On lap 17, Bas Leinders passed Patrick Friesacher to take sixth. Rain began to fall on the last lap, however, and Friesacher rear-ended Leinders, with Sébastien Bourdais passing them both to take the final point. Sperafico took his first win in F3000, with Wilson second and Maurício third. With Webber's retirement, Wilson secured the championship with one race remaining. Webber and Enge were equal on points in second and third, with fourth-placed Bourdais unable to catch them.

== Classification ==
=== Qualifying ===
Pos	No	Driver	Team	Time/Gap	Grid
1	4	(Brazil) Ricardo Sperafico	Petrobras Junior Team	2:13.129	1
2	3	(Brazil) Antônio Pizzonia	Petrobras Junior Team	+0.412	2
3	10	(United Kingdom) Justin Wilson	Coca-Cola Nordic Racing	+1.132	3
4	18	(Brazil) Ricardo Maurício	Red Bull Junior Team F3000	+1.376	4
5	1	(Australia) Mark Webber	Super Nova Racing	+1.551	5
6	17	(Austria) Patrick Friesacher	Red Bull Junior Team F3000	+1.634	6
7	15	(United Kingdom) Darren Manning	Arden Team Russia	+1.709	7
8	20	(Belgium) Marc Goossens	Coloni F3000	+2.154	8
9	9	(Czech Republic) Tomáš Enge	Coca-Cola Nordic Racing	+2.242	9
10	25	(Belgium) Bas Leinders	KTR	+2.347	10
11	21	(France) Sébastien Bourdais	DAMS	+2.352	11
12	19	(Italy) Fabrizio Gollin	Coloni F3000	+2.899	12
13	11	(Argentina) Norberto Fontana	F3000 Prost Junior Team	+3.387	13
14	2	(Brazil) Mário Haberfeld	Super Nova Racing	+3.406	14
15	22	(United States) Derek Hill	DAMS	+3.504	15
16	8	(Italy) Andrea Piccini	European Minardi F3000	+3.661	16
17	7	(Belgium) David Saelens	European Minardi F3000	+3.720	17
18	5	(Italy) Enrico Toccacelo	Team Astromega	+4.035	18
19	6	(Italy) Giorgio Pantano	Team Astromega	+4.108	19
20	12	(Hungary) Zsolt Baumgartner	F3000 Prost Junior Team	+4.481	20
21	29	(Italy) Gabriele Lancieri	Durango	+5.004	21
22	26	(Switzerland) Joël Camathias	KTR	+6.355	22
23	30	(Spain) Antonio García	Durango	+6.822	23
24	16	(Russia) Viktor Maslov	Arden Team Russia	+13.683	24

=== Race ===
Pos	No	Driver	Team	Laps	Time/Retired	Grid	Points
1	4	(Brazil) Ricardo Sperafico	Petrobras Junior Team	22	51:48.919	1	10
2	10	(United Kingdom) Justin Wilson	Coca-Cola Nordic Racing	22	+11.585	3	6
3	18	(Brazil) Ricardo Maurício	Red Bull Junior Team F3000	22	+16.982	4	4
4	9	(Czech Republic) Tomáš Enge	Coca-Cola Nordic Racing	22	+18.252	9	3
5	20	(Belgium) Marc Goossens	Coloni F3000	22	+31.865	8	2
6	21	(France) Sébastien Bourdais	DAMS	22	+32.782	11	1
7	25	(Belgium) Bas Leinders	KTR	22	+32.873	10	
8	3	(Brazil) Antônio Pizzonia	Petrobras Junior Team	22	+33.519	2	
9	22	(United States) Derek Hill	DAMS	22	+40.159	15	
10	17	(Austria) Patrick Friesacher	Red Bull Junior Team F3000	22	+47.749	6	
11	6	(Italy) Giorgio Pantano	Team Astromega	22	+48.713	19	
12	19	(Italy) Fabrizio Gollin	Coloni F3000	22	+50.663	12	
13	12	(Hungary) Zsolt Baumgartner	F3000 Prost Junior Team	22	+1:02.890	20	
14	29	(Italy) Gabriele Lancieri	Durango	22	+1:03.122	21	
15	26	(Switzerland) Joël Camathias	KTR	22	+1:04.230	22	
16	30	(Spain) Antonio García	Durango	22	+1:04.997	23	
17	5	(Italy) Enrico Toccacelo	Team Astromega	22	+1:17.505	18	
18	16	(Russia) Viktor Maslov	Arden Team Russia	22	+1:42.194	24	
19	2	(Brazil) Mário Haberfeld	Super Nova Racing	22	+1:42.753	14	
Ret	11	(Argentina) Norberto Fontana	F3000 Prost Junior Team	11	Retired	13	
Ret	15	(United Kingdom) Darren Manning	Arden Team Russia	8	Retired	7	
Ret	7	(Belgium) David Saelens	European Minardi F3000	7	Retired	17	
Ret	8	(Italy) Andrea Piccini	European Minardi F3000	7	Retired	16	
Ret	1	(Australia) Mark Webber	Super Nova Racing	1	Retired	5	
Fastest lap: (Brazil) Ricardo Sperafico (2:08.781 on lap 21)

== Standings after the event ==
Drivers' Championship standings

Pos.	Driver	Points
1	(United Kingdom) Justin Wilson	65
2	(Australia) Mark Webber	39
3	(Czech Republic) Tomáš Enge	39
4	(France) Sébastien Bourdais	26
5	(Brazil) Antônio Pizzonia	22

Teams' Championship standings

Pos.	Team	Points
1	(United Kingdom) Coca-Cola Nordic Racing	104
2	(United Kingdom) Super Nova Racing	42
3	(Brazil) Petrobras Junior Team	42
4	(France) DAMS	26
5	(Austria) Red Bull Junior Team F3000	21

- Note: Only the top five positions are included for both sets of standings.

== See also ==
- 2001 Belgian Grand Prix

Previous round: 2001 Hungaroring F3000 round	International Formula 3000 Championship; 2001 season	Next round: 2001 Monza F3000 round
Previous round: 2000 Spa-Francorchamps F3000 round	Spa-Francorchamps F3000 round	Next round: 2002 Spa-Francorchamps F3000 round
