= 2001 Belgian Grand Prix =

14th round of the 2001 Formula One season

Race 14 of 17 in the 2001 Formula One World Championship
← Previous race	Next race →
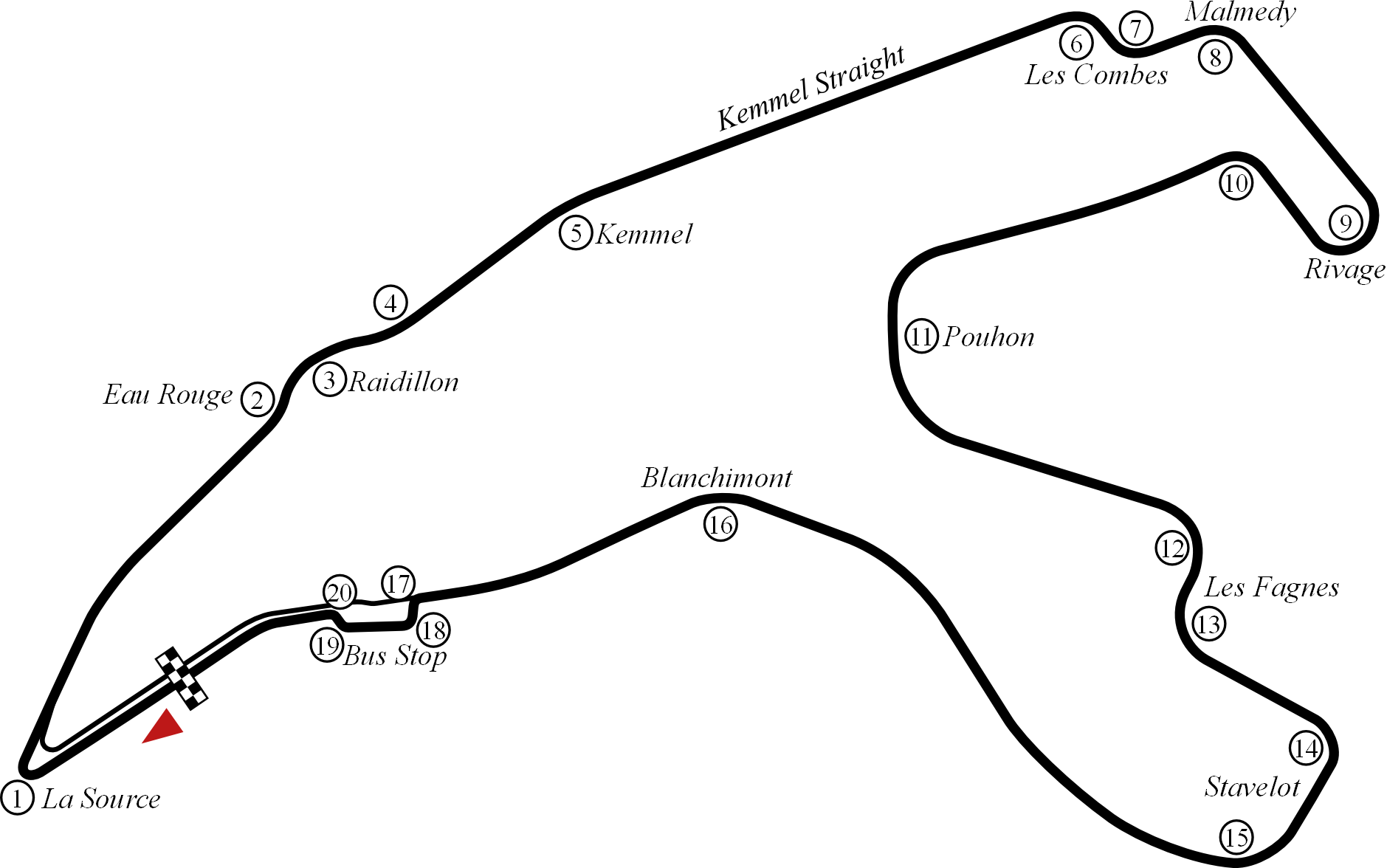

Race details
- Date: 2 September 2001
- Official name: 2001 Foster's Belgian Grand Prix
- Location: Circuit de Spa-Francorchamps, Francorchamps, Wallonia, Belgium
- Course: Permanent racing facility
- Course length: 6.968 km (4.330 miles)
- Distance: 36 laps, 250.848 km (155.870 miles)
- Scheduled distance: 44 laps, 306.592 km (190.507 miles)
- Weather: Overcast, mild, dry, Air Temp: 12 to 16 °C (54 to 61 °F)
- Attendance: 85,000

Pole position
Driver	(Colombia) Juan Pablo Montoya	Williams-BMW
- Time: 1:52.072

Fastest lap
Driver	(Germany) Michael Schumacher	Ferrari
- Time: 1:49.758 on lap 3

Podium
First	(Germany) Michael Schumacher	Ferrari
Second	(United Kingdom) David Coulthard	McLaren-Mercedes
Third	(Italy) Giancarlo Fisichella	Benetton-Renault

The 2001 Belgian Grand Prix (officially the 2001 Foster's Belgian Grand Prix) was a Formula One motor race held before 85,000 spectators at the Circuit de Spa-Francorchamps in Francorchamps, Wallonia, Belgium on 2 September 2001. It was the 14th round of the 2001 Formula One World Championship and the 48th Belgian Grand Prix counting as part of the World Championship. Ferrari driver and World Drivers' Champion Michael Schumacher won the 36-lap race starting from third. David Coulthard finished in second for McLaren with Benetton's Giancarlo Fisichella third, scoring the final podium of the Benetton team.

Juan Pablo Montoya of the Williams team won the pole position by recording the fastest lap in the one-hour qualifying session; he stalled on the grid and forfeited pole. His teammate Ralf Schumacher lost the lead to Michael Schumacher into Les Combes turn. Michael Schumacher led the next four laps before the race was stopped for an accident involving Jaguar's Eddie Irvine and Luciano Burti of Prost on lap five. The race was declared null and void and recommenced with a revised distance of 36 laps. Michael Schumacher led every lap of the restarted race to take his eighth victory of the season. Schumacher overtook the four-time world champion Alain Prost's all-time career wins total with his 52nd, a record he held until Lewis Hamilton surpassed it at the 2020 Portuguese Grand Prix.

Burti was kept in hospital with facial bruising and a concussion until 10 September; his accident helped enhance helmet safety. The race result allowed Coulthard to further his World Drivers' Championship advantage over the second Ferrari driver of Rubens Barrichello by four championship points in second position. Barrichello in turn moved another two championship points clear of fourth-placed Ralf Schumacher. In the World Constructors' Championship, McLaren in second moved further ahead of Williams in third by nine championship points as Jordan passed British American Racing (BAR) for fifth with three races left in the season.

== Background ==
The 2001 Belgian Grand Prix was the 14th of the 17 races in the 2001 Formula One World Championship and the 48th time it was part of the Formula One World Championship. It took place at the 21-turn 6.968 km (4.330 mi) Circuit de Spa-Francorchamps in Francorchamps, Wallonia, Belgium on 2 September. While the track's length has been reduced from 14 km (8.7 mi) for safety reasons, it is still the longest in Formula One. It contains a number of fast and long sweeping corners along with a high degree of gradient change, which puts a high amount of g-force on the driver.

Before the race, both the World Drivers' Championship and World Constructors' Championship were already settled, with Ferrari driver Michael Schumacher having claimed both titles in the preceding Hungarian Grand Prix, with the closest team McLaren too many championship points behind to be able to catch them. Several positions in the standings were undecided. In the battle for second place, David Coulthard of McLaren was five championship points in front of the second Ferrari of Rubens Barrichello in third and a further two ahead of Williams' Ralf Schumacher in fourth. In the Constructors' standings, McLaren in second were 13 championship points ahead of Williams, while Sauber and British American Racing (BAR) contended for fourth.

Although a crash during testing at the Mugello Circuit left him with a sore neck, doctors deemed Michael Schumacher fit to compete in Belgium. He stated that he would be unwilling to be concentrated in his driving, and did not say when he felt he would surpass four-time world champion Alain Prost's all-time record of 51 race victories (broken in 1987), which he equalled in Hungary. Coulthard said he set himself the objective of winning the season 's final four races to consolidate second in the World Drivers' Championship. Barrichello stated he had also targeted second and his teammate Michael Schumacher promised to help him, saying, "For me the season has just started."

There were 11 teams (each representing a different constructor) of two drivers each entered for the event. Several teams modified their cars to suit the mid-downforce setup of the Circuit de Spa-Francorchamps. Williams debuted a lighter and stiffer chassis by 3 kg (6.6 lb) for driver Ralf Schumacher with a revised aerodynamic package for better airflow to the FW23. Ferrari introduced a new front wing to the F2001 that was built upon a set of solutions tested in the previous race and adapted to suit the layout of the track. The Jordan team reverted to the aerodynamic configuration they used for the EJ11 at the preceding Hungarian Grand Prix. Prost adopted a new rear suspension geometry with a deformable structure and a new semi-axle structure, characterised by a large extractor profile. Benetton, Arrows and Jaguar carried over technical innovations developed for use in Hungary to Belgium, while Minardi manufactured a new chassis, the PS01B, which featured a revised rear crash structure and gearbox.

== Practice ==
There were four scheduled practice sessions prior to Sunday's race, two one-hour sessions on Friday and two 45-minute sessions on Saturday. The Friday practice sessions were held in cool and overcast conditions that turned to a downpour in the afternoon, causing several drivers to aquaplane on the wet track. In the first practice session, Michael Schumacher was fastest with a lap of 1:48.655, followed by Jordan's Jarno Trulli, Barrichello, Mika Häkkinen of McLaren, Ralf Schumacher, Jean Alesi in the second Jordan, the Saubers of Kimi Räikkönen and Nick Heidfeld, Juan Pablo Montoya of Williams and Giancarlo Fisichella's Benetton. Coulthard lost control of his car by running wide onto sodden dirt, hitting a kerb at the exit of Les Fagnes corner, a right-hander taken at 160 km/h (99 mph) and collided with a left-hand side metal barrier head-on, tearing the right-front wheel from his car's tethers. His damaged car skidded backwards along the wall before stopping. Coulthard clambered out of the car unhurt; he missed the second practice session while it was repaired.

Michael Schumacher recorded the day's quickest lap in the second session at 1:48.655. Trulli did not improve his lap but duplicated his first session result in second. Barrichello remained in third, with Fisichella was fourth-fastest, ahead of Häkkinen and his compatriot Räikkönen. Ralf Schumacher, Jaguar driver Eddie Irvine, Alesi and Benetton's Jenson Button rounded out the top ten fastest drivers. Rain fell came 16 minutes in and eased five minutes later. Button hit an armco metal barrier along the pit lane exiting the Bus Stop chicane. The impact damaged a track-rod on Button's car. As Michael Schumacher was about to overtake Pedro de la Rosa's Jaguar going downhill to Eau Rouge corner, he could not see him due to spray reducing visibility and he hit the rear of De la Rosa's car. His front wing was broken and De la Rosa's left-rear wheel was punctured. Montoya lost control of his car on a wet kerb and he damaged it after a spin into a tyre wall out of Les Combes corner.

The third practice session was delayed for two hours due to fog, rain showers and low clouds reducing visibility. Race organisers later cancelled it for safety reasons because the emergency medical helicopters were grounded in Liège. When the sky cleared at 10:00 local time, it was agreed by the Grand Prix organisers that a single 45-minute session would be held without practice starts to prevent a delay in television coverage for qualifying. Williams led the session with Montoya fastest with a 1:47.974 lap and Ralf Schumacher in second. Häkkinen, Coulthard. Barrichello, Fisichella, Irvine, BAR driver Jacques Villeneuve, Button and Alesi completed the top ten ahead of qualifying. Several drivers ran off the slippery track surface during the session. De la Rosa, Irvine and Häkkinen went wide into the grass at the Bus Stop chicane, while Heinz-Harald Frentzen of the Prost team and Button ran off at Les Combes turn.

== Qualifying ==
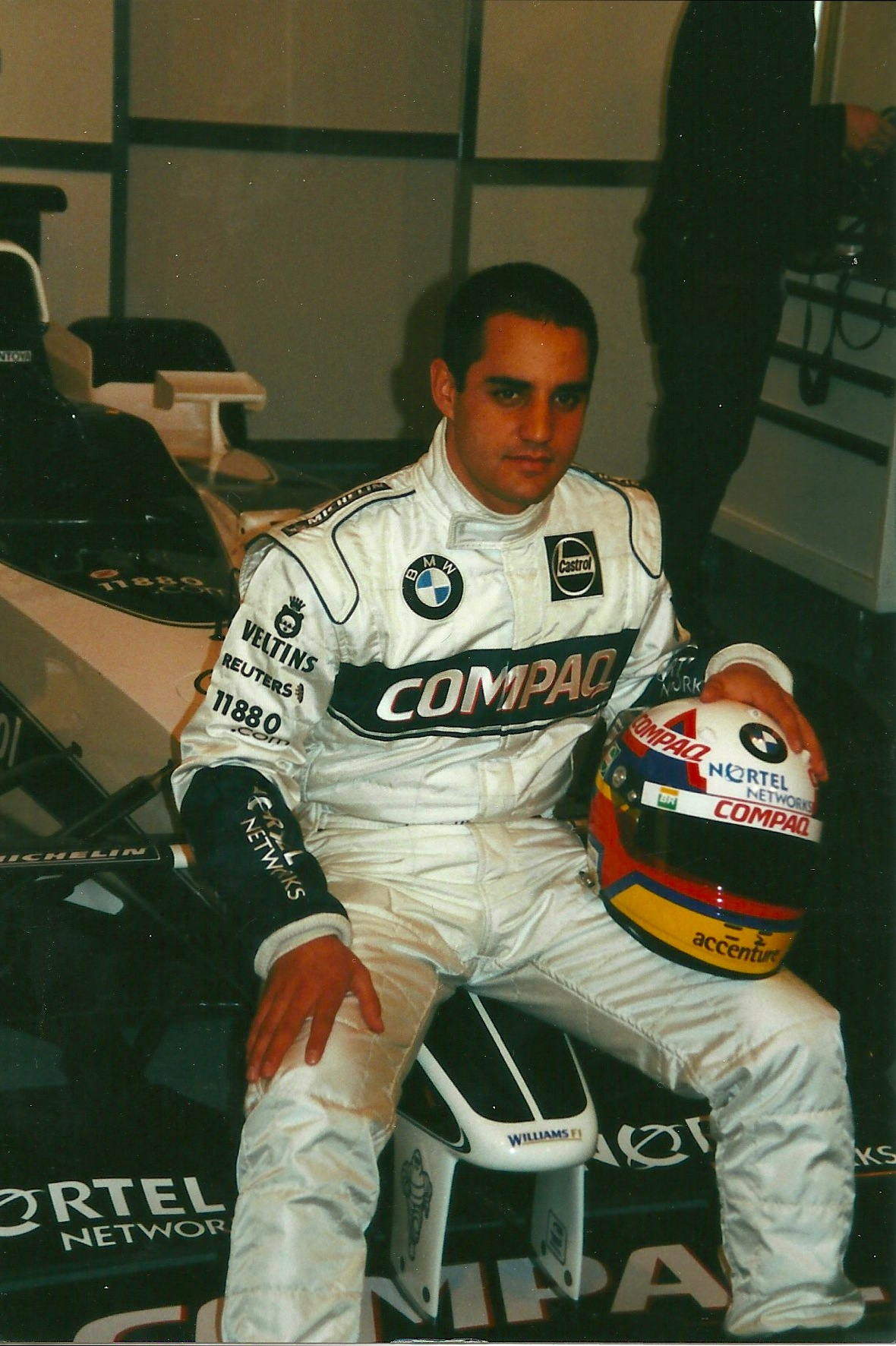
Juan Pablo Montoya earned the second pole position of his career after trading the fastest lap with his Williams teammate Ralf Schumacher in the final five minutes of qualifying.

Saturday afternoon's one-hour qualifying session saw drivers limited to twelve laps, with the starting order decided by their fastest laps. During this session the 107% rule was in effect, requiring each driver to remain within 107 per cent of the fastest lap time to qualify for the race. Heavy rain at the start meant the field stayed in their garages for 26 minutes before cars on intermediate tyres ventured onto the track. By then, sunny weather allowed the track to progressively dry and cars were fitted with dry tyres in the last five minutes. Williams were the first team to switch their cars onto the dry tyres earlier than any one else. Montoya traded the fastest lap with his teammate Ralf Schumacher and took the second pole position of his career with a 1:52.072 lap, with Ralf Schumacher second. Michael Schumacher in third drove the spare Ferrari before switching to his race car when the track dried. Frentzen was hesitant to switch to the dry tyres until his team owner Alain Prost convinced him to do so and qualified fourth. Barrichello, fifth, used the intermediate tyres throughout. Villeneuve ran conservatively because he feared making an error and took sixth. Häkkinen qualified in seventh, bemoaning his conservative driving style due to the timing of the switch from intermediate to dry tyres. Eighth-placed Fisichella reported that the feel of his car was adequate in changeable weather. Coulthard fell from third to ninth in qualifying's final seconds due to his team telling him there was insufficient time to have the dry tyres fitted to his car and traffic slowed him. De la Rosa, tenth, experienced a loss in oil pressure.

Panis in 11th was affected by an electrical fault that a change of steering wheel failed to rectify; his third timed lap was set too late to improve his position. Räikkönen was 6th in the final ten seconds until a reoccurring transmission fault left him in 12th. Alesi chose not to switch to the dry tyres and was 13th. Heidfeld in 14th had the same transmission fault as his teammate Räikkönen and yellow flags were waved when he stopped at Burneville corner. An excessive amount of oversteer and driving on intermediate tyres left Button in 15th. A lack of time to switch from the intermediate to dry tyres restricted Trulli to 16th. Irvine in 17th switched to the spare Jaguar because the exhaust on his car broke and the spare had excess understeer. 18th-placed Luciano Burti of Prost was delayed for half a minute because of a tyre pressure adjustment error that prevented him from improving his best lap. Jos Verstappen was 19th in the faster Arrows car. Irvine slowed him and a plan to do two timed laps did not come to fruition as he crossed the start/finish line three seconds after qualifying ended. Minardi's Fernando Alonso started 20th due to him being on intermediate tyres at qualifying's end. The Arrows and Minardi formation continued on the eleventh row with Enrique Bernoldi 21st after he lost time because he was called to the weighbridge with five minutes left and he ran out of fuel at the Bus Stop chicane. Tarso Marques took 22nd after Ralf Schumacher slowed him and his car's rear suspension buckled on his fourth timed lap.

=== Post-qualifying ===
Verstappen, Alonso, Bernoldi and Marques failed to lap within the 107 per cent limit; all four drivers were allowed to start the race because the stewards deemed that there had been "exceptional circumstances" owing to the changeable track conditions and also because they lapped within the limit during free practice. Afterwards, the McLaren team principal Ron Dennis lodged an official protest to the world governing body of motorsport, the Fédération Internationale de l'Automobile (FIA), to clarify if the regulation barring drivers on improving their lap times under yellow flag conditions was consistent after 17 competitors went faster with yellow flags to tend to Heidfeld's car. At a meeting of the race stewards eight hours later, data, information and oral arguments were reviewed and Dennis' protest was rejected. McLaren did not appeal the decision.

=== Qualifying classification ===
Pos	No.	Driver	Constructor	Lap	Gap	Grid
1	6	(Colombia) Juan Pablo Montoya	Williams-BMW	1:52.072	—	1
2	5	(Germany) Ralf Schumacher	Williams-BMW	1:52.959	+0.887	2
3	1	(Germany) Michael Schumacher	Ferrari	1:54.685	+2.613	3
4	22	(Germany) Heinz-Harald Frentzen	Prost-Acer	1:55.233	+3.161	4
5	2	(Brazil) Rubens Barrichello	Ferrari	1:56.116	+4.044	5
6	10	(Canada) Jacques Villeneuve	BAR-Honda	1:57.038	+4.966	6
7	3	(Finland) Mika Häkkinen	McLaren-Mercedes	1:57.043	+4.971	7
8	7	(Italy) Giancarlo Fisichella	Benetton-Renault	1:57.668	+5.596	8
9	4	(United Kingdom) David Coulthard	McLaren-Mercedes	1:58.008	+5.936	9
10	19	(Spain) Pedro de la Rosa	Jaguar-Cosworth	1:58.519	+6.447	10
11	9	(France) Olivier Panis	BAR-Honda	1:58.838	+6.766	11
12	17	(Finland) Kimi Räikkönen	Sauber-Petronas	1:59.050	+6.978	12
13	12	(France) Jean Alesi	Jordan-Honda	1:59.128	+7.056	13
14	16	(Germany) Nick Heidfeld	Sauber-Petronas	1:59.302	+7.230	14
15	8	(United Kingdom) Jenson Button	Benetton-Renault	1:59.587	+7.515	15
16	11	(Italy) Jarno Trulli	Jordan-Honda	1:59.647	+7.575	16
17	18	(United Kingdom) Eddie Irvine	Jaguar-Cosworth	1:59.689	+7.617	17
18	23	(Brazil) Luciano Burti	Prost-Acer	1:59.900	+7.828	18
107% time: 1:59.917
19	14	(Netherlands) Jos Verstappen	Arrows-Asiatech	2:02.039	+9.967^{1}	19
20	21	(Spain) Fernando Alonso	Minardi-European	2:02.594	+10.522^{1}	20
21	15	(Brazil) Enrique Bernoldi	Arrows-Asiatech	2:03.048	+10.976^{1}	21
22	20	(Brazil) Tarso Marques	Minardi-European	2:04.204	+12.132^{1}	22

Notes:

- ^1 – Jos Verstappen, Fernando Alonso, Enrique Bernoldi and Tarso Marques all set their lap times outside the 107% limit, but were allowed to race due to heavy rain during qualifying.

== Warm-up ==
A 30-minute warm-up session was held on Sunday morning in cloudy and dry weather. All drivers fine-tuned their race setups against the weather conditions of the time, and set laps in their spare cars. Michael Schumacher was fastest with a 1:49.495 lap, followed by Häkkinen, Räikkönen, Ralf Schumacher, Irvine, Frentzen, Montoya, Trulli, Heidfeld and Barrichello. Trulli removed his car's front wing and bargeboards by running wide onto some bumps at Les Combes turn. He was unable to steer and stopped on a trackside wall. Alonso lost control of his car exiting Stavelot corner and destroyed its left-hand corner in a collision with an inside wall. He ricocheted to the right; Alonso exited the car unhurt with aid from track marshals, as Marques stopped to check if his teammate was unhurt. Alonso was transported to the track's medical centre for a precautionary check-up. He was passed fit to compete in the race and used the spare Minardi car.

== Race ==
=== First start and Burti's accident ===
The race was attended by 85,000 spectators and took place in the afternoon from 14:00 local time. The weather at the start was overcast and some light rain fell on the track 11 minutes before the formation lap. The air temperature was between 12 and 16 °C (54 and 61 °F) and the track temperature was 17 °C (63 °F); weather forecasts on the day of the race predicted the possibility of heavy rain in its latter stages. After the formation lap, just before the race was about to commence, Frentzen and Marques stalled because of gearbox problems. Both drivers were ordered to start from the back of the grid, causing the start to be aborted, and the number of laps reduced from 44 to 43. At the start of the second formation lap, Montoya was stationary as he engaged first gear. He forfeited pole position and began from the rear of the grid. His teammate Ralf Schumacher led on the approach to Les Combes corner as he locked his brakes. Barrichello kept third as Fisichella moved to fourth. Going uphill into Les Combes corner, Michael Schumacher pulled out of Ralf Schumacher's slipstream and made a pass around the left for first place. Villeneuve fell behind the McLarens at the same time.

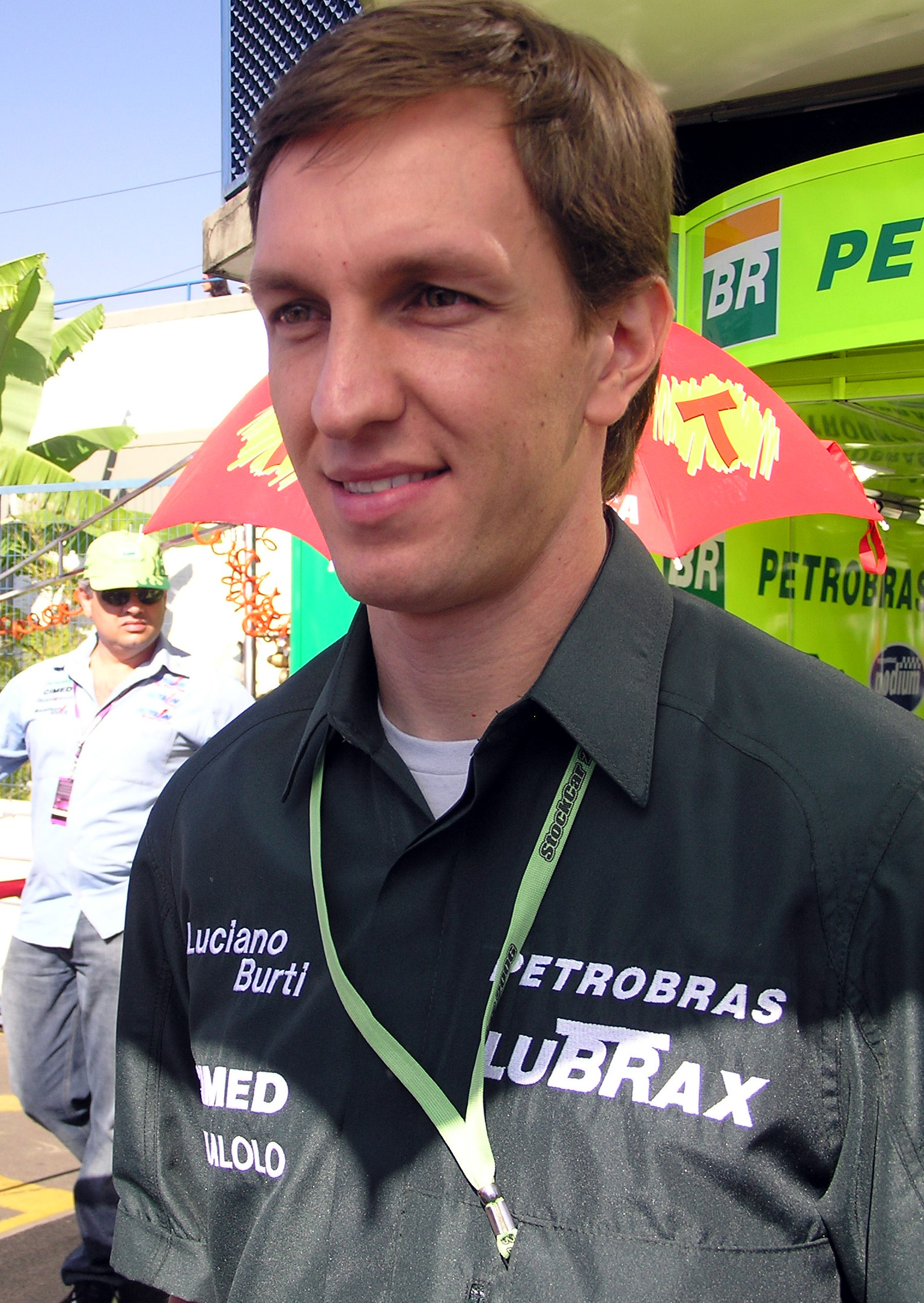
Luciano Burti (pictured in 2006) was involved in an impact with a tyre wall at Blanchimont corner on lap five.

Button moved from 13th to ninth by the conclusion of the first lap, while Villeneuve fell four positions over the same distance. At the close of the first lap, Michael Schumacher led Ralf Schumacher by 2.1 seconds. Barrichello was a further six-tenths of a second behind Ralf Schumacher in third, while Fisichella in fourth was 2.2 seconds adrift of Barrichello. Over the next three laps, Michael Schumacher pulled away from the rest of the field, extending his advantage to 6.3 seconds. In the meantime, Alesi overtook De la Rosa and Panis to advance to 16th as Montoya passed Verstappen for 16th. On lap three, Fisichella lost fourth to Häkkinen into Les Combes corner, and a driver error at the exit to Rivage turn lost him fifth to Coulthard on the outside into Pouhon corner. Further back, Räikkönen braked later than Villeneuve at the Bus Stop chicane to move into seventh. Trulli passed Irvine for 14th. On the same lap, Alonso retired with a broken gearshaft. On the fourth lap, Alesi passed Button for ninth, as Heidfeld and Trulli demoted Panis from 12th to 14th. Irvine lost another position when Montoya passed him for 15th.

As Burti was about to pass Irvine on the inside at the high-speed Blanchimont corner on lap five, Irvine was caught off guard and stayed on the racing line, putting Burti's left-hand wheels onto the grass. Burti's right-front wheel and Irvine's Jaguar made contact. removing Burti's front wing and downforce. Irvine drove over the Prost's front wing and destroyed it. Burti was sent spearing across the gravel trap and into a four-deep tyre barrier at 150 mph (240 km/h). The front of Burti's full-face crash helmet broke as it took the full force of the 111 g_{0} (1,090 m/s^{2}) impact. Further injury to Burti was prevented because a head and neck restraint absorbed the impact.

Irvine went off the track with the right-hand wheels removed from his Jaguar. He exited his car to assist the track marshals in removing the tyres pinned to Burti and released his car from the barrier. Räikkönen stopped with a transmission failure as Frentzen and Marques made pit stops. The safety car was deployed before the race was stopped. All the remaining drivers went on the starting grid to await the restart. Meanwhile, the FIA medical delegate Sid Watkins arrived to direct the extraction of Burti from his car. Burti was transported to the circuit's medical centre by ambulance with no emergency treatment. After a medical inspection, he was flown by helicopter to the Centre hospitalier universitaire de Liège in a conscious and stable condition with a serious concussion.

=== Restarted race ===
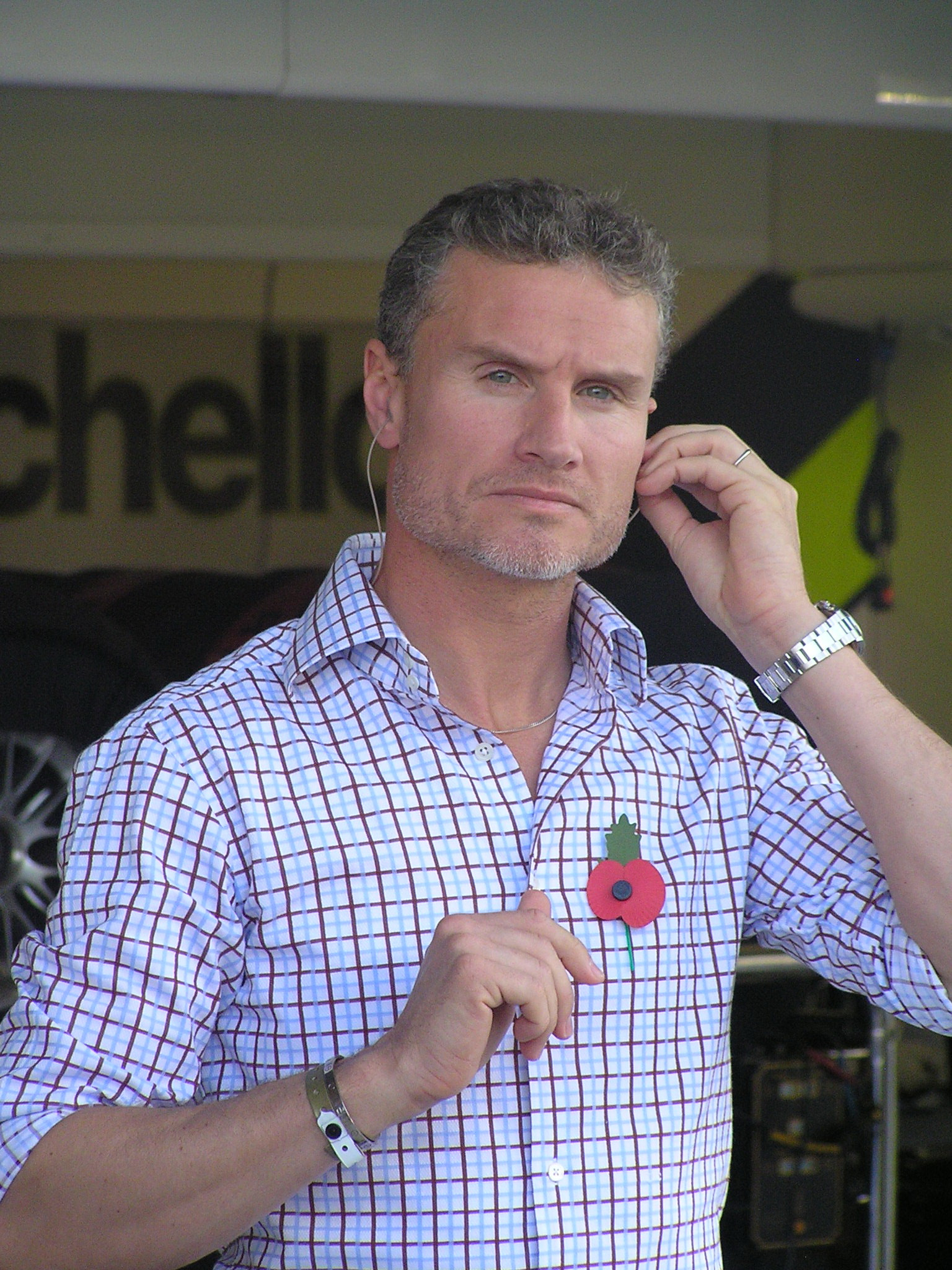
David Coulthard (pictured in 2009) finished in second to consolidate second in the World Drivers' Championship.

According to series regulations, the first four laps were not counted towards the restarted race because it had been declared null and void, meaning they did not officially happen with the only retained element being the order the cars were in after the end of lap four, revising the distance to 36 laps and reducing the field to 18 cars. The race restarted at 14:45 local time. Ralf Schumacher's Williams was not lowered from a jack at the start of the third formation lap because his mechanics immersed themselves with replacing a rear wing beam for safety reasons after Montoya's rear wing broke. He avoided incurring a ten-second stop-and-go penalty and was required to start from the back of the grid. Fisichella made a fast start from sixth to pass the McLarens and Barrichello, but not Michael Schumacher for first into the La Source hairpin. Barrichello maintained third as Button moved to fourth, who did not have the necessary frontal grip to maintain his pace through the first corner. Coulthard was briefly ahead of Häkkinen before his teammate passed. Cresting a hill, both McLarens overtook Button as the BARs made contact and briefly drove off the circuit.

On the lap, after Verstappen hit him, Heidfeld attempted to pass De la Rosa on the left at the La Source hairpin. The two made contact with Heidfeld retiring immediately with front wing and suspension damage. De la Rosa entered the pit lane the lap after with car damage. At the front, Michael Schumacher began to pull away from the rest of the field, increasing his lead over Fisichella to five seconds by the third lap, as Fisichella slowed the other faster cars. One lap prior, Montoya's car pulled to one side though he overtook four cars before he retired from an engine failure. On lap three, Trulli overtook Button for sixth. Button lost seventh to Alesi on the following lap. Michael Schumacher further extended his advantage to 14 seconds over Fisichella by lap six as Coulthard challenged the Benetton. Further back, Villeneuve passed Button for eighth. The first round of pit stops began at the conclusion of the lap when Trulli entered the pit lane. After his pit stop on lap seven, Panis crossed the white line to denote the pit lane exit, an infraction of the sporting regulations which entailed a ten-second stop-and-go penalty.

Barrichello made his first stop on the ninth lap. Michael Schumacher led the rest of the field by 20 seconds when he entered the pit lane for the first time on the next lap. He rejoined the race in second. Fisichella led before his own stop at the conclusion of the lap. He retained second place. Panis took his ten-second stop-and-go-penalty on the 12th lap. After the pit stops, the Grand Prix settled into a rhythm with Michael Schumacher further extending his advantage over Fisichella to 24.8 seconds by lap 15. At the rear of the field, Marques made an unscheduled visit to the pit lane for repairs to his suspension. Two laps later, Michael Schumacher lost concentration as he steered his Ferrari to the left at Stavelot turn and ran wide after missing the apex of the corner. He rejoined the track without losing the lead. His teammate Barrichello hit a trackside bollard entering the Bus Stop chicane on lap 17. His car lost front downforce from removing his front wing and he completed a full lap at reduced speed after missing the pit lane entry. Barrichello rejoined the race in ninth.

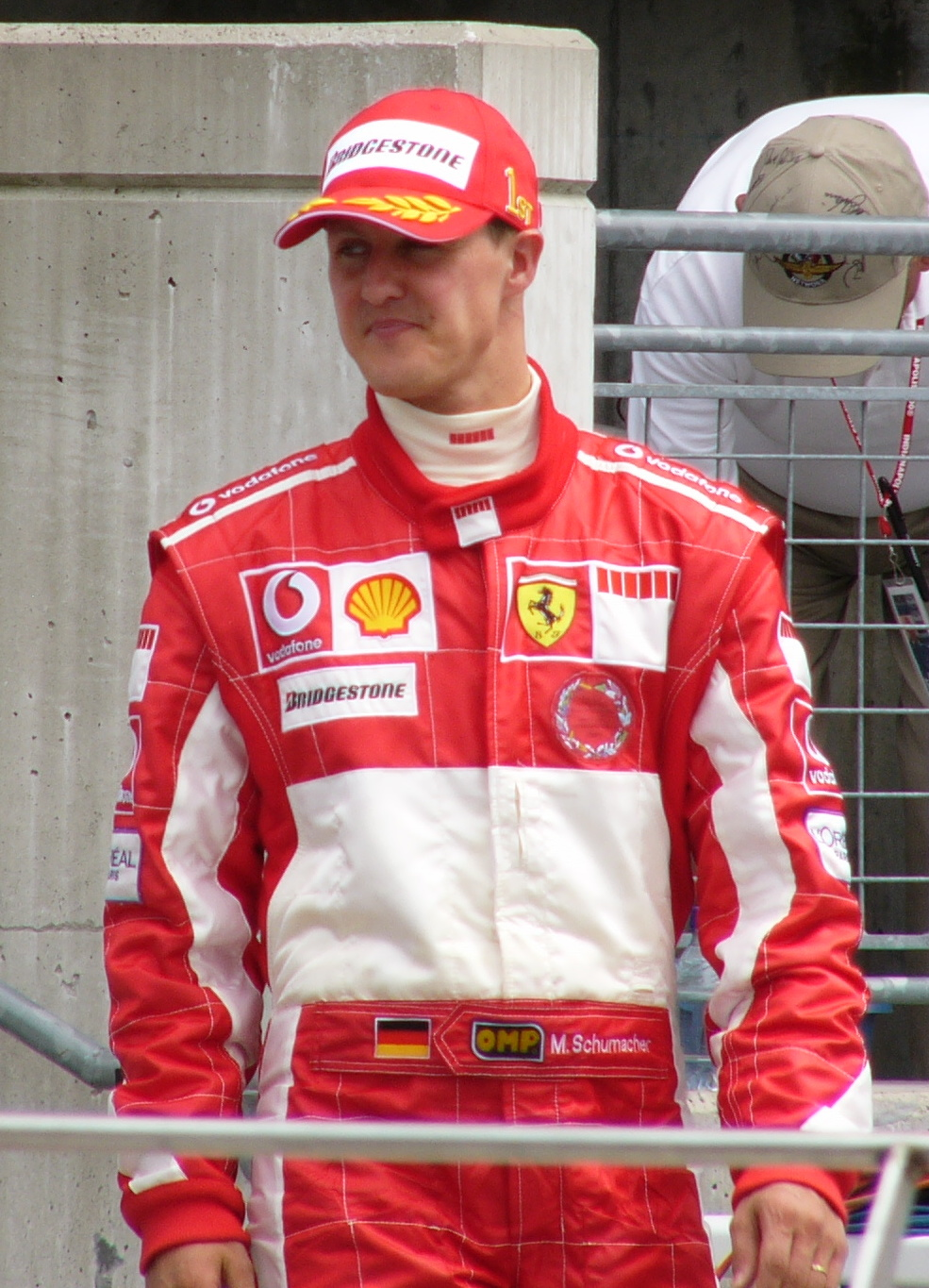
Michael Schumacher (pictured in 2005) took his eighth victory of the season and he broke the all-time wins record held by Alain Prost with the 52nd of his career.

On lap 18, while under pressure from Ralf Schumacher, Button struck a plastic bollard marker denoting the left-hand kerb situated on the entry to the Bus Stop Chicane. The contact removed his front wing which folded under his front-left wheel and the lack of downforce sent him into the outside barrier. Trulli entered the pit lane on the following lap to begin the second round of pit stops. His teammate Alesi followed on lap 20. Fisichella was six-tenths of a second ahead of Coulthard in third by the time of his second stop on lap 23. Fisichella's car sprayed oil on Coulthard, causing the McLaren driver to clean his visor on the main straights. Coulthard made his stop the lap after, and emerged in third behind Fisichella. Michael Schumacher led by 43.6 seconds by the time of his second pit stop at the end of lap 25 and he retained the lead. On lap 26, Coulthard steered left to attempt an unsuccessful overtake on Fisichella. Häkkinen ran wide entering the Bus Stop chicane on lap 27, rejoining the track through the grass. On the next lap, Fisichella lost momentum while lapping Bernoldi, and Coulthard steered left to pass but Fisichella defended at the La Source hairpin. Coulthard tried again by slipstreaming Fisichella in Eau Rouge corner and passed him on the outside for second.

On lap 29, Ralf Schumacher overtook Villeneuve for eighth. Three laps later, Barrichello passed Alesi on the straight towards Les Combes corner for sixth. Jordan lost one of its EJ11s on the lap when the fifth-placed Trulli drove to the side of the track with oil smoke billowing from the rear of his car. In the final three laps, Ralf Schumacher attempted to pass Alesi five times and was unsuccessful each time. At the front, Coulthard reduced Michael Schumacher's lead by a second per lap, as the latter slowed, but Schumacher took his fifth win at the Circuit de-Spa Francorchamps to equal the triple world champion Ayrton Senna's record number of wins at the track. It was his eighth victory of 2001 and the 52nd of his career, overtaking the four-time world champion Alain Prost's all-time record of 51 wins. (Note: Lewis Hamilton broke the record for the highest number of Formula One Grand Prix victories when he achieved his 92nd race win at the 2020 Portuguese Grand Prix.) Coulthard followed 10.098 seconds later in second and Fisichella finished a season-high third, by driving through the entire race on the same front tyres. Häkkinen took fourth, Barrichello fifth and Alesi was the last of the point-scorers in sixth. The final finishers were Ralf Schumacher, Villeneuve, Frentzen, Verstappen, Panis, Bernoldi and Marques.

== Post-race ==
The top three drivers appeared on the podium to collect their trophies and spoke to the media in a later press conference. Michael Schumacher said he slowed to be conservative, "For whatever reason, I thought I had the chance to open up the gap for an extra pit and we didn't know whether they would do so I just wanted to have that safety margin because I was faster than Giancarlo and David couldn't get by I was able to open up such a lead." He said that his 52nd win had no priority, saying, "Actually I'm very delighted about this but I will be much more delighted sitting one day on the sofa, retired, and I have a cigar and beer in hand and think about it." Coulthard admitted being surprised over Fisichella's pace. He said he was pleased to finish second and increase his World Drivers' Championship advantage over Barrichello, "Given the weekend I've had, I'm obviously very happy to have got second place, hoping that Luciano is 100 per cent and able to do the next race, and then we can all feel it's been a positive weekend." Fisichella attributed his third-place result to the new aerodynamic package on his Benetton that gave him improved grip and handling, "We did a very good job. I did two amazing starts, especially the second one from sixth position to second, and I'm happy. It's a great day, and I'd like to say thank you to the team."

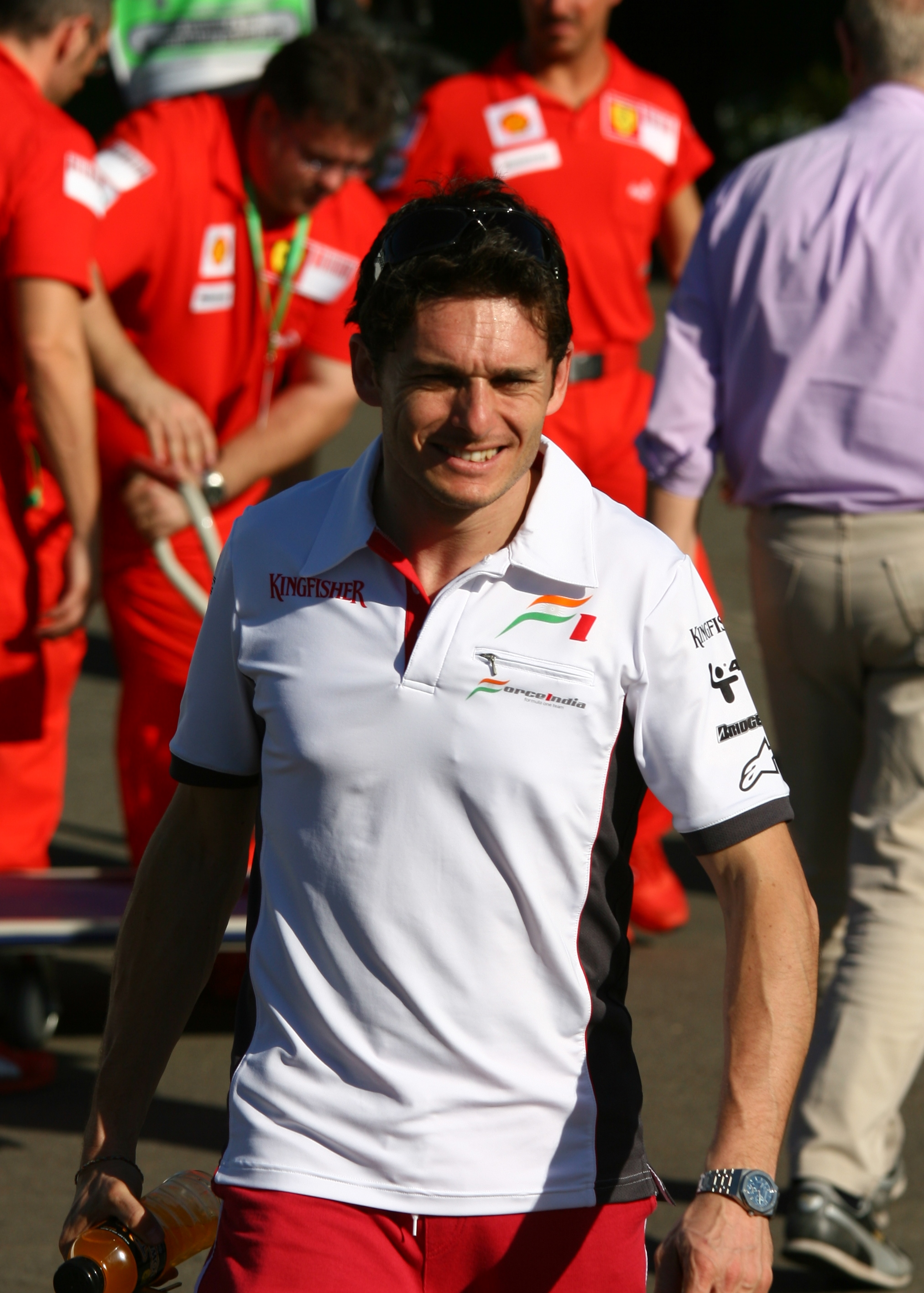
Giancarlo Fisichella (pictured in 2008) finished third for Benetton, his best result of the season.

After the race, the stewards investigated the collision between Irvine and Burti on lap five by reviewing television footage and listening to Irvine's oral explanation. They took no further action and deemed it "a racing incident", with neither driver in particular to blame. It was the second major accident Burti had sustained in more than a month as he barrel rolled twice after colliding with the rear of Michael Schumacher's car at the start of the German Grand Prix in July 2001. The accident was a talking point for days after the race, with Alain Prost noting that Burti's impact would have been fatal about ten years earlier, and former driver Jacques Laffite praised the strength of the modern Formula One car's monocoque. The Jaguar team principal Niki Lauda told the press he was unhappy with the inaction and conduct of the track marshals, "The marshals were not operating properly. Eddie had to take over and basically tell them what to do. He was really part of the rescue there, which normally drivers shouldn't do but he had to do it, since they didn't seem to have an idea what they need to do." Irvine said he had not seen Burti attempting to pass him on the outside but was relieved that Burti was conscious.

Burti sustained facial and head bruising and he underwent a brain scan, which revealed a head injury though no swelling of the brain. Gary Hartstein, a member of the FIA's medical delegation, predicted that Burti would take up to two months to complete a full recovery. Burti underwent further tests and was placed in an induced coma until he left intensive care on 4 September. He was discharged from hospital six days later and returned to Monaco to continue his recuperation. Burti was replaced by the Czech International Formula 3000 driver Tomáš Enge for the rest of the season. He stated in subsequent interviews that he cannot recall the crash. The effects of the accident caused Burti to suffer from seizures and amnesia for the next four months, both of which required medication. The FIA analysed the accident to enhance safety and outlawed the creation of holes in helmets allowing drinking tubes and radio communication wires to pass through. The incident was used as a case study in the development of the halo. In an interview with Autosport in 2019, Burti attributed his survival to vehicle and circuit safety improvements made after Ayrton Senna's fatal accident at the 1994 San Marino Grand Prix.

Prost was impressed by Michael Schumacher breaking his wins record, "Michael has the qualities to succeed with his talents and his concentration and motivation. That is why I believe he can be a five-time or even a six-time champion. He and Ferrari are a big force now. I don't know if he can win 60 or 70 races, but there is no reason why not." Frank Williams, the team principal of the Williams squad, stated that they made an error in keeping Ralf Schumacher's car on a jack at the start of the third formation lap and that nobody could be blamed for it. Button said of his accident that caused him to retire from the race on lap 18, "The car was fine when I turned left, but it didn't want to turn right because the wing had fallen under my wheels, and so I hit the wall." The result left Coulthard nine championship points in front of Barrichello in the battle for second while the latter moved a further two championship points clear of Ralf Schumacher. In the World Constructors' Championship, McLaren moved further away from Williams by another nine championship points, while Jordan moved past BAR for fifth with three races left in the season.

=== Race classification ===
Drivers who scored championship points are denoted in bold.

Pos	No.	Driver	Constructor	Tyre	Laps	Time/Retired	Grid	Points
1	1	(Germany) **Michael Schumacher**	**Ferrari**	B	36	1:08:05.002	1	10
2	4	(United Kingdom) **David Coulthard**	**McLaren-Mercedes**	B	36	+ 10.098	5	6
3	7	(Italy) **Giancarlo Fisichella**	**Benetton-Renault**	M	36	+ 27.742	6	4
4	3	(Finland) **Mika Häkkinen**	**McLaren-Mercedes**	B	36	+ 36.087	4	3
5	2	(Brazil) **Rubens Barrichello**	**Ferrari**	B	36	+ 54.521	3	2
6	12	(France) **Jean Alesi**	**Jordan-Honda**	B	36	+ 59.684	8	1
7	5	(Germany) Ralf Schumacher	Williams-BMW	M	36	+ 59.986	19	
8	10	(Canada) Jacques Villeneuve	BAR-Honda	B	36	+ 1:04.970	7	
9	22	(Germany) Heinz-Harald Frentzen	Prost-Acer	M	35	+ 1 Lap	15	
10	14	(Netherlands) Jos Verstappen	Arrows-Asiatech	B	35	+ 1 Lap	16	
11	9	(France) Olivier Panis	BAR-Honda	B	35	+ 1 Lap	13	
12	15	(Brazil) Enrique Bernoldi	Arrows-Asiatech	B	35	+ 1 Lap	17	
13	20	(Brazil) Tarso Marques	Minardi-European	M	32	+ 4 Laps	18	
Ret	11	(Italy) Jarno Trulli	Jordan-Honda	B	31	Engine	12	
Ret	8	(United Kingdom) Jenson Button	Benetton-Renault	M	17	Accident	9	
Ret	6	(Colombia) Juan Pablo Montoya	Williams-BMW	M	1	Engine	14	
Ret	19	(Spain) Pedro de la Rosa	Jaguar-Cosworth	M	1	Collision damage	10	
Ret	16	(Germany) Nick Heidfeld	Sauber-Petronas	B	0	Collision	11	
DNS	17	(Finland) Kimi Räikkönen	Sauber-Petronas	B	0	Transmission^{1}	—	
DNS	18	(United Kingdom) Eddie Irvine	Jaguar-Cosworth	M	0	Collision^{1}	—	
DNS	23	(Brazil) Luciano Burti	Prost-Acer	M	0	Collision/Injury^{1}	—	
DNS	21	(Spain) Fernando Alonso	Minardi-European	M	0	Gearbox^{1}	—	

Notes

- **^1** – Kimi Räikkönen, Eddie Irvine, Luciano Burti and Fernando Alonso are listed as Did Not Start even though they took part in the original start. (Note: Räikkönen, Irvine, Burti and Alonso are listed as Did Not Start in the official results, despite having taken the first start prior to the race being stopped. Regulations at the time were such that in the event of a stoppage being ordered on the first lap, that start would be deemed null-and-void, and the second start would take place as if the first had never occurred. As these drivers did not make the second start, they are classified as DNS.)

== Championship standings after the race ==
Drivers' Championship standings

+/–	Pos	Driver	Points
	1	(Germany) Michael Schumacher*	104
	2	(United Kingdom) David Coulthard	57
	3	(Brazil) Rubens Barrichello	48
	4	(Germany) Ralf Schumacher	44
	5	(Finland) Mika Häkkinen	24

Constructors' Championship standings

+/–	Pos	Constructor	Points
	1	(Italy) Ferrari*	152
	2	(United Kingdom) McLaren-Mercedes	81
	3	(United Kingdom) Williams-BMW	59
	4	(Switzerland) Sauber-Petronas	20
	5	(United Kingdom) BAR-Honda	16
Sources:

- Note: Only the top five positions are included for both sets of standings.
- Bold text and an asterisk indicates the 2001 World Champions.

== See also ==
- 2001 Spa-Francorchamps F3000 round

== Notes ==
Previous race: 2001 Hungarian Grand Prix	FIA Formula One World Championship; 2001 season	Next race: 2001 Italian Grand Prix
Previous race: 2000 Belgian Grand Prix	Belgian Grand Prix	Next race: 2002 Belgian Grand Prix
