= Petrobras Junior Team =

(Brazil) Petrobras Junior Team
- Founded: 1999
- Folded: 2002
- Team principal(s): David Sears
- Former series: Formula 3000
- Drivers' Championships: 2000 Formula 3000 (Junqueira)

Petrobras Junior Team was a team in the FIA Formula 3000 Championship, run by Petrobras as part of their Brazilian drivers development programme. Named after Williams Racing then sponsor and Brazil´s largest company, Petrobras, the team was active for three seasons between 1999 and 2002, earning numerous wins as well as the 2000 drivers title with Bruno Junqueira.

== History ==
The project was originally conceived as a means of supporting young Brazilian drivers and taking them through the ranks of the world's motorsport ladder to Formula One.

During the first years of the project there was a search for the best young Brazilian drivers in the South American championships. In the late 1990s, Petrobas entered into a sponsorship agreement with the Williams team, placing their protégé Bruno Junqueira in the role of test driver. At the same time, a technical support agreement was signed with Super Nova Racing and their own team was created in the International Formula 3000.

The project in F3000 lasted until the end of 2002. Peak results were obtained in 2000, when Bruno Junqueira defeated Super Nova Racing's Nicolas Minassian, winning the championship title.

The collaboration with Williams ended at the same time. On the eve of the 2000 season, the British team could have selected Junqeuria as one of the drivers for their Formula One team that season, but in the end, they preferred the British Jenson Button. The further attempt to put Jungueira behind the wheel of a competitive car could not be organized, and in 2001 the Brazilian left for North America to drive in the CART Series.

Antônio Pizzonia became the second Brazilian racer who, with the support of Petronas funding, got into Formula One. In 2002-2005 he served as a test driver for the Williams team, and in 2004-2005 he spent several races for the team, replacing injured drivers. In 2003 he ran several races for Jaguar F1 team, but was not kept on for the following season due to poor results.

== Complete Formula 3000 results ==
Year	Chassis	Engine	Tyres	Drivers	1	2	3	4	5	6	7	8	9	10	11	12	T.C.	Points
1999	Lola B99/50	Zytek V8	A		IMO	MON	CAT	MAG	SIL	A1R	HOC	HUN	SPA	NÜR			3rd	34
1999	Lola B99/50	Zytek V8	A	(Brazil) Max Wilson	Ret	3	Ret	Ret	Ret	Ret	2	Ret		3			3rd	34
1999	Lola B99/50	Zytek V8	A	(Brazil) Marcelo Battistuzzi									17				3rd	34
1999	Lola B99/50	Zytek V8	A	(Brazil) Bruno Junqueira	Ret	6	4	Ret	2	DNQ	1	15	Ret	16			3rd	34
2000	Lola B99/50	Zytek V8	A		IMO	SIL	CAT	NÜR	MON	MAG	A1R	HOC	HUN	SPA			2nd	54
2000	Lola B99/50	Zytek V8	A	(Brazil) Jaime Melo	4	16	14	6	DNQ	17	5	8	DNQ	18			2nd	54
2000	Lola B99/50	Zytek V8	A	(Brazil) Bruno Junqueira	2	5	1	1	1	13	7	Ret	1	9			2nd	54
2001	Lola B99/50	Zytek V8	A		INT	IMO	CAT	A1R	MON	NÜR	MAG	SIL	HOC	HUN	SPA	MNZ	2nd	46
2001	Lola B99/50	Zytek V8	A	(Brazil) Antônio Pizzonia	9	4	6	4	Ret	6	10	3	1	Ret	8	Ret	2nd	46
2001	Lola B99/50	Zytek V8	A	(Brazil) Ricardo Sperafico	Ret	14	19	Ret	5	3	13	11	3	7	1	3	2nd	46
2002	Lola B02/50	Zytek V8	A		INT	IMO	CAT	A1R	MON	NÜR	SIL	MAG	HOC	HUN	SPA	MNZ	4th	40
2002	Lola B02/50	Zytek V8	A	(Brazil) Antônio Pizzonia	4	4	10	7	4	3	5	4	Ret	Ret	Ret	DSQ	4th	40
2002	Lola B02/50	Zytek V8	A	(Brazil) Ricardo Sperafico	7	14	9	8	5	2	3	15	6	5	3	4	4th	40
