= 2000 International Formula 3000 Championship =

Motor racing competition

The 2000 International Formula 3000 season was the thirty-fourth season of the second-tier of Formula One feeder championship and also sixteenth season under the International Formula 3000 Championship moniker. It featured the 2000 FIA Formula 3000 International Championship which was contested over ten rounds from 8 April to 26 August 2000. Bruno Junqueira won the Drivers’ Championship and D2 Playlife Super Nova won the Teams’ title.

For 2000, the FIA imposed an upper limit of 15 teams of 2 cars each, with one of the places reserved for the winning team of the 1999 Italian Formula 3000 Championship; therefore, 7 bottom-ranked teams of 1999 would not have been eligible to advance to the next year. Portman-Arrows team collapsed midway through the 1999 championship, and 6 formerly competing teams were initially excluded from the 2000 championship.

In between the seasons, RSM Marko managed to buy the Oreca's slot (at the same time adopting the name Red Bull Junior Team), Arden merged with Draco, and Coloni bought the slot from Team Martello, the winners of the Italian championship; therefore, only Monaco Motorsport, GP Racing and Durango were left behind. Additionally, West Competition was renamed to mySap.com, and the second Super Nova squad (former Den Blå Avis) continued to operate under the name of Petrobras Junior Team.

As the FIA was changing the operational structure of Formula 3000 for the latter to be more of a proper seeder and supporting series for Formula One, a few F3000 teams announced their collaboration with Formula One teams. European Formula was confirmed as a junior team for Arrows instead of the de-funct Portman team, Team Astromega announced partnership with Minardi, and Super Nova announced two partnerships: with Benetton, as D2 Super Nova, and with Williams, as Petrobras Junior Team (former Den Blå Avis). Additionally, mySap.com was officially recognized as the McLaren junior team, Red Bull Junior Team retained the status of a junior team for Sauber, and Apomatox continued to run under Prost as Gauloises Formula. Although Arden's Darren Manning spent the full year as a BAR test driver, the BAR team opted not to work with Arden, and Ferrari, Jordan, and Jaguar also did not maintain active partnerships with any of the Formula 3000 teams.

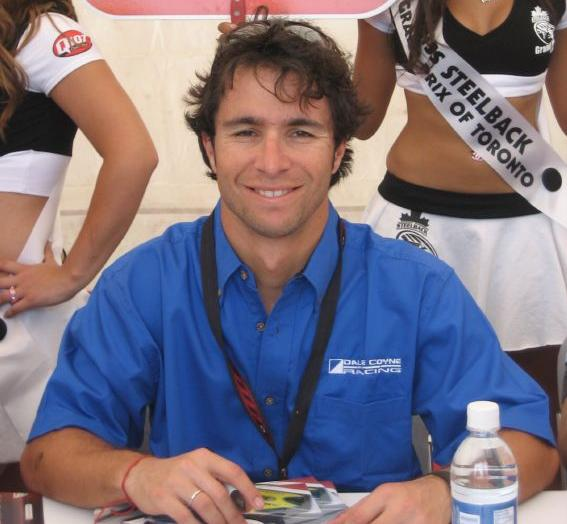
Bruno Junqueira (pictured in 2007), won the championship

== Drivers and teams ==
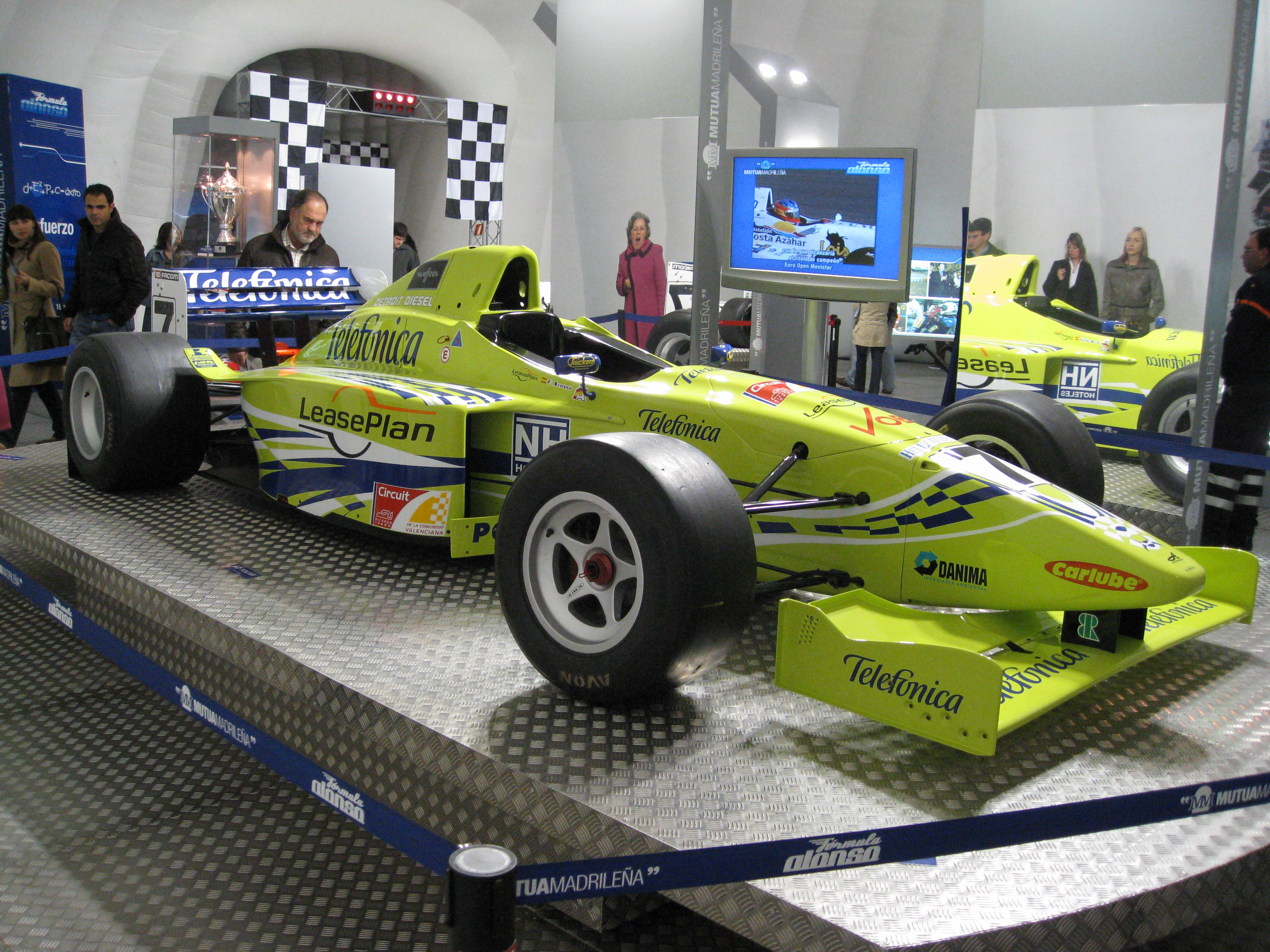
The Lola B99/50 driven to 4th place in the 2000 Drivers' Championship by Fernando Alonso

The following drivers and teams contested the 2000 FIA Formula 3000 International Championship.

| Team | No. | Driver | Rounds |
|---|---|---|---|
| (United Kingdom) MySAP.com | 1 | (France) Stéphane Sarrazin | 1–6 |
| (United Kingdom) MySAP.com | 1 | (South Africa) Tomas Scheckter | 7–10 |
| (United Kingdom) MySAP.com | 2 | (Czech Republic) Tomáš Enge | All |
| (United Kingdom) D2 Playlife Super Nova | 3 | (France) Nicolas Minassian | All |
| (United Kingdom) D2 Playlife Super Nova | 4 | (Belgium) David Saelens | All |
| (Brazil) Petrobras Junior Team | 5 | (Brazil) Jaime Melo | All |
| (Brazil) Petrobras Junior Team | 6 | (Brazil) Bruno Junqueira | All |
| (Belgium) Team Astromega | 7 | (Spain) Fernando Alonso | All |
| (Belgium) Team Astromega | 8 | (France) Fabrice Walfisch | 1–6 |
| (Belgium) Team Astromega | 8 | (Belgium) Marc Goossens | 7–10 |
| (France) Gauloises Formula | 9 | (Portugal) André Couto | All |
| (France) Gauloises Formula | 10 | (France) Sébastien Bourdais | All |
| (United Kingdom) Kid Jensen Racing | 11 | (Italy) Andrea Piccini | All |
| (United Kingdom) Kid Jensen Racing | 12 | (Belgium) Bas Leinders | All |
| (Austria) Red Bull Junior Team | 15 | (Brazil) Ricardo Mauricio | All |
| (Austria) Red Bull Junior Team | 16 | (Brazil) Enrique Bernoldi | All |
| (United Kingdom) Nordic Racing | 17 | (United Kingdom) Kevin McGarrity | All |
| (United Kingdom) Nordic Racing | 18 | (United Kingdom) Justin Wilson | All |
| (Italy) WRT | 19 | (Japan) Hidetoshi Mitsusada | 1–3 |
| (Italy) WRT | 19 | (United Kingdom) Marc Hynes | 4–6 |
| (Italy) WRT | 19 | (United Kingdom) Dino Morelli | 7–8 |
| (Italy) WRT | 19 | (France) Soheil Ayari | 9–10 |
| (Italy) WRT | 20 | (Indonesia) Ananda Mikola | All |
| (France) DAMS | 21 | (France) Franck Montagny | All |
| (France) DAMS | 22 | (Denmark) Kristian Kolby | All |
| (United Kingdom) Arden Team Russia | 23 | (United Kingdom) Darren Manning | All |
| (United Kingdom) Arden Team Russia | 24 | (Russia) Viktor Maslov | All |
| (United Kingdom) European Arrows F3000 | 25 | (Australia) Mark Webber | All |
| (United Kingdom) European Arrows F3000 | 26 | (Netherlands) Christijan Albers | All |
| (Belgium) Witmeur KTR | 27 | (Belgium) Jeffrey van Hooydonk | All |
| (Belgium) Witmeur KTR | 28 | (Belgium) Yves Olivier | All |
| (United Kingdom) Fortec Motorsport | 29 | (Brazil) Mario Haberfeld | 1–3, 6–10 |
| (United Kingdom) Fortec Motorsport | 29 | (United Kingdom) Jamie Davies | 4–5 |
| (United Kingdom) Fortec Motorsport | 30 | (United Kingdom) Jamie Davies | 10 |
| (United Kingdom) Fortec Motorsport | 30 | (Germany) Andreas Scheld | 1–9 |
| (Italy) Coloni F3000 | 31 | (France) Soheil Ayari | 1–7 |
| (Italy) Coloni F3000 | 31 | (France) Fabrice Walfisch | 9–10 |
| (Italy) Coloni F3000 | 32 | (Italy) Fabrizio Gollin | All |

All cars were Lola B99/50s powered by Zytek V8 engines.

== Calendar ==
| Round | Circuit | Date | Laps | Distance | Time | Speed | Pole position | Fastest lap | Winner | Winning team | Report |
|---|---|---|---|---|---|---|---|---|---|---|---|
| 1 | (Italy) Autodromo Enzo e Dino Ferrari | 8 April | 42 | 4.9325=207.165 km | 1'11:06.160 | 174.816 km/h | (Brazil) Bruno Junqueira | (France) Stéphane Sarrazin | (France) Nicolas Minassian | (United Kingdom) D2 Playlife Super Nova | Report |
| 2 | (United Kingdom) Silverstone Circuit | 22 April | 40 | 5.14=205.60 km | 1'22:24.239 | 149.702 km/h | (United Kingdom) Darren Manning | (France) Stéphane Sarrazin | (Australia) Mark Webber | (United Kingdom) European Arrows F3000 | Report |
| 3 | (Spain) Circuit de Catalunya | 5 May | 44 | 4.728=208.032 km | 1'11:52.069 | 173.679 km/h | (Brazil) Enrique Bernoldi | (Australia) Mark Webber | (Brazil) Bruno Junqueira | (Brazil) Petrobras Junior Team | Report |
| 4 | (Germany) Nürburgring | 20 May | 45 | 4.556=205.02 km | 1'24:07.032 | 146.239 km/h | (Belgium) David Saelens | (Brazil) Bruno Junqueira | (Brazil) Bruno Junqueira | (Brazil) Petrobras Junior Team | Report |
| 5 | Circuit de Monaco | 3 June | 50 | 3.367=168.35 km | 1'19:08.755 | 127.625 km/h | (Belgium) David Saelens | (Spain) Fernando Alonso | (Brazil) Bruno Junqueira | (Brazil) Petrobras Junior Team | Report |
| 6 | (France) Circuit de Nevers Magny-Cours | 1 July | 49 | 4.25=208.25 km | 1'15:44.627 | 164.964 km/h | (France) Sébastien Bourdais | (Australia) Mark Webber | (France) Nicolas Minassian | (United Kingdom) D2 Playlife Super Nova | Report |
| 7 | (Austria) A1 Ring | 15 July | 48 | 4.319=207.312 km | 1'10:42.354 | 175.922 km/h | (Belgium) Jeffrey van Hooydonk | (Czech Republic) Tomáš Enge | (France) Nicolas Minassian | (United Kingdom) D2 Playlife Super Nova | Report |
| 8 | (Germany) Hockenheimring | 29 July | 31 | 6.823=211.513 km | 1'14:50.567 | 169.566 km/h | (Czech Republic) Tomáš Enge | (United Kingdom) Darren Manning | (Czech Republic) Tomáš Enge | (United Kingdom) MySap.com | Report |
| 9 | (Hungary) Hungaroring | 12 August | 52 | 3.972=206.544 km | 1'21:30.052 | 152.055 km/h | (Brazil) Bruno Junqueira | (Belgium) Marc Goossens | (Brazil) Bruno Junqueira | (Brazil) Petrobras Junior Team | Report |
| 10 | (Belgium) Circuit de Spa-Francorchamps | 26 August | 30 | 6.968=209.04 km | 1'08:04.964 | 184.223 km/h | (Spain) Fernando Alonso | (Spain) Fernando Alonso | (Spain) Fernando Alonso | (Belgium) Team Astromega | Report |

== Final points standings ==
=== Teams ===
| Position | Team | Imo | Sil | Bar | Nur | Mon | Mag | A1-R | Hoc | Hun | Spa | Total |
| 1 | D2 Playlife Super Nova | 10 | – | 10 | – | 6 | 14 | 10 | – | 3 | 7 | 60 |
| 2 | Petrobras Junior Team | 9 | 2 | 10 | 11 | 10 | – | 2 | – | 10 | – | 54 |
| 3 | MySAP.com Team | 2 | – | – | 2 | – | 3 | – | 16 | – | 1 | 24 |
| 4 | Team Astromega | – | – | – | – | – | – | 1 | – | 6 | 16 | 23 |
| 5 | European Arrows Team | 4 | 10 | – | – | – | – | 3 | 4 | – | – | 21 |
| 6 | Nordic Racing.com | – | 4 | 2 | – | 3 | – | 6 | – | 2 | 2 | 19 |
| 7 | Gauloises Formula | – | – | – | 7 | – | 6 | – | – | – | – | 13 |
| 8 | Arden Team Russia | – | 6 | – | – | – | – | 4 | – | – | – | 10 |
| 9 | Red Bull Junior Team | – | 3 | – | – | – | – | – | 1 | 5 | – | 9 |
| 10 | Coloni F3000 | 1 | 1 | – | 6 | – | – | – | – | – | – | 8 |
| 11 | DAMS | – | – | 1 | – | 1 | 3 | – | 2 | – | – | 7 |
| 12 | Fortec Motorsport | – | – | – | – | 6 | – | – | – | – | – | 6 |
| 13 | Witmeur Team KTR | – | – | 3 | – | – | – | – | – | – | – | 3 |
| 14 | Kid Jensen Racing | – | – | – | – | – | – | – | 3 | – | – | 3 |
| 15 | World Racing Team | – | – | – | – | – | – | – | – | – | – | 0 |

== Drivers' championship ==
| Pos | Driver | IMO (Italy) | SIL (United Kingdom) | CAT (Spain) | NUR (Germany) | MON (Monaco) | MAG (France) | A1R (Austria) | HOC (Germany) | HUN (Hungary) | SPA (Belgium) | Points |
|---|---|---|---|---|---|---|---|---|---|---|---|---|
| 1 | (Brazil) Bruno Junqueira | **2** | 5 | 1 | 1 | 1 | 13 | 7 | Ret | **1** | 9 | 48 |
| 2 | (France) Nicolas Minassian | 1 | 11 | 2 | Ret | 5 | 1 | 1 | 7 | 4 | 3 | 45 |
| 3 | (Australia) Mark Webber | 3 | 1 | Ret | Ret | Ret | 16 | 4 | 3 | 9 | 16 | 21 |
| 4 | (Spain) Fernando Alonso | 9 | EX | 15 | Ret | 8 | Ret | 6 | Ret | 2 | **1** | 17 |
| 5 | (United Kingdom) Justin Wilson | 8 | 3 | 5 | Ret | 7 | 9 | 2 | Ret | 5 | 5 | 16 |
| 6 | (Czech Republic) Tomáš Enge | 5 | 13 | Ret | Ret | DNQ | 5 | 16 | **1** | 17 | 6 | 15 |
| 7 | (Belgium) David Saelens | Ret | 8 | 3 | **Ret** | **3** | 3 | Ret | 18 | 11 | 4 | 15 |
| 8 | (United Kingdom) Darren Manning | 12 | **2** | 7 | Ret | Ret | 8 | 3 | 13 | 8 | Ret | 10 |
| 9 | (France) Sébastien Bourdais | Ret | 10 | 8 | 4 | Ret | **2** | 9 | DNS | 14 | Ret | 9 |
| 10 | (Italy) Fabrizio Gollin | 6 | DNQ | 17 | 2 | 10 | 14 | DNQ | Ret | 18 | Ret | 7 |
| 11 | (United Kingdom) Jamie Davies | | | | 8 | 2 | | | | | 12 | 6 |
| 12 | (Belgium) Marc Goossens | | | | | | | 10 | 10 | 19 | 2 | 6 |
| 13 | (South Africa) Tomas Scheckter | | | | | | | 18 | 2 | 21 | DNS | 6 |
| 14 | (Brazil) Jaime Melo, Jr. | 4 | 16 | 14 | 6 | DNQ | 17 | 5 | 8 | DNQ | 18 | 6 |
| 15 | (France) Franck Montagny | Ret | 7 | 6 | Ret | 6 | 4 | 17 | Ret | 12 | Ret | 5 |
| 16 | (Brazil) Enrique Bernoldi | Ret | 4 | **Ret** | Ret | Ret | 23 | 14 | 6 | 6 | 10 | 5 |
| 17 | (Brazil) Ricardo Mauricio | Ret | Ret | Ret | Ret | Ret | Ret | Ret | 14 | 3 | 7 | 4 |
| 18 | (Portugal) André Couto | Ret | 14 | 10 | 3 | Ret | 21 | Ret | 17 | Ret | 11 | 4 |
| 19 | (Belgium) Jeffrey van Hooydonk | 13 | 9 | 4 | Ret | 9 | 19 | **12** | Ret | Ret | Ret | 3 |
| 20 | (Italy) Andrea Piccini | Ret | DNQ | 11 | 9 | Ret | 12 | Ret | 4 | 16 | 13 | 3 |
| 21 | (United Kingdom) Kevin McGarrity | 15 | Ret | Ret | Ret | 4 | 15 | DNQ | 11 | Ret | DNQ | 3 |
| 22 | (France) Stéphane Sarrazin | 7 | 19 | 9 | 5 | Ret | 6 | | | | | 3 |
| 23 | (Denmark) Kristian Kolby | 11 | 12 | Ret | DNQ | DNQ | DNQ | DNQ | 5 | 20 | 15 | 2 |
| 24 | (France) Soheil Ayari | 14 | 6 | Ret | Ret | Ret | 22 | Ret | | 13 | 14 | 1 |
| 25 | (Netherlands) Christijan Albers | Ret | Ret | 12 | Ret | Ret | 7 | Ret | DNQ | Ret | 8 | 0 |
| 26 | (Belgium) Bas Leinders | 16 | Ret | 13 | Ret | Ret | 10 | 11 | DNQ | 7 | Ret | 0 |
| 27 | (Belgium) Yves Olivier | DNQ | 20 | 16 | 7 | DNQ | DNQ | 13 | 16 | DNQ | 17 | 0 |
| 28 | (Brazil) Mario Haberfeld | 10 | 17 | DNS | | | 11 | 8 | 9 | 15 | Ret | 0 |
| 29 | (France) Fabrice Walfisch | Ret | Ret | DNQ | Ret | Ret | 18 | | | 10 | DNQ | 0 |
| 30 | (Germany) Andreas Scheld | DNQ | Ret | DNQ | DSQ | 11 | DNQ | Ret | 12 | DNQ | | 0 |
| 31 | (Indonesia) Ananda Mikola | Ret | 15 | 19 | DNQ | Ret | 20 | 15 | DNQ | Ret | DNQ | 0 |
| 32 | (Russia) Viktor Maslov | DNQ | Ret | 18 | DNQ | Ret | DNQ | Ret | 15 | DNQ | DNQ | 0 |
| – | (United Kingdom) Marc Hynes | | | | DNQ | Ret | Ret | | | | | 0 |
| – | (United Kingdom) Dino Morelli | | | | | | | DNQ | Ret | | | 0 |
| – | (Japan) Hidetoshi Mitsusada | DNQ | DNQ | DNQ | | | | | | | | 0 |
| Pos | Driver | IMO (Italy) | SIL (United Kingdom) | CAT (Spain) | NUR (Germany) | MON (Monaco) | MAG (France) | A1R (Austria) | HOC (Germany) | HUN (Hungary) | SPA (Belgium) | Points |

| Colour | Result |
|---|---|
| Gold | Winner |
| Silver | Second place |
| Bronze | Third place |
| Green | Points classification |
| Blue | Non-points classification |
| Blue | Non-classified finish (NC) |
| Purple | Retired, not classified (Ret) |
| Red | Did not qualify (DNQ) |
| Red | Did not pre-qualify (DNPQ) |
| Black | Disqualified (DSQ) |
| White | Did not start (DNS) |
| White | Withdrew (WD) |
| White | Race cancelled (C) |
| Blank | Did not practice (DNP) |
| Blank | Did not arrive (DNA) |
| Blank | Excluded (EX) |

**Bold** – Pole
Italics – Fastest lap

=== Notes ===
- All drivers used Lola B99/50 chassis, with Zytek V8 engines, and Avon tyres.
- Andreas Scheld was disqualified from second place at the European round (Nürburgring) for using an illegal front wing.
