= International Formula 3000 =

Former Single-Seater Racing Championship

- Category: Single-seaters
- Country: International
- Inaugural season: 1985
- Folded: 2004
- Constructors: Lola, March, Ralt, Reynard, Dallara
- Engine suppliers: Judd (badged as Zytek)
- Tyre suppliers: Avon
- Last Drivers' champion: (Italy) Vitantonio Liuzzi
- Last Teams' champion: (United Kingdom) Arden International

The Formula 3000 International Championship was a motor racing series created by the Fédération Internationale de l'Automobile (FIA) in 1985 to become the final preparatory step for drivers hoping to enter Formula One. Formula Two had become too expensive, and was dominated by works-run cars with factory engines; the hope was that Formula 3000 would offer quicker, cheaper, more open racing. The series began as an open specification, then tyres were standardized from 1986 onwards, followed by engines and chassis in 1996. The series ran annually until 2004, and was replaced in 2005 by the GP2 Series.

The series was staged as the Formula 3000 European Championship in 1985, as the Formula 3000 Intercontinental Championship in 1986 and 1987 and then as the Formula 3000 International Championship from 1988 to 2004.

== Engines ==
Formula 3000 replaced Formula Two, and was so named because the engines used were limited to 3000cc maximum capacity. Initially, the Cosworth DFV was a popular choice, having been made obsolete in Formula One by the adoption of 1.5 litre turbocharged engines. The rules permitted any 90-degree V8 engine, fitted with a rev-limiter to keep power output under control. As well as the Cosworth, a Honda engine based on an Indy V8 by John Judd also appeared; a rumoured Lamborghini V8 never raced. In later years, a Mugen-Honda V8 became the unit of choice, eclipsing the DFV; Cosworth responded with the brand new AC engine. Costs began to increase significantly.

== Chassis ==
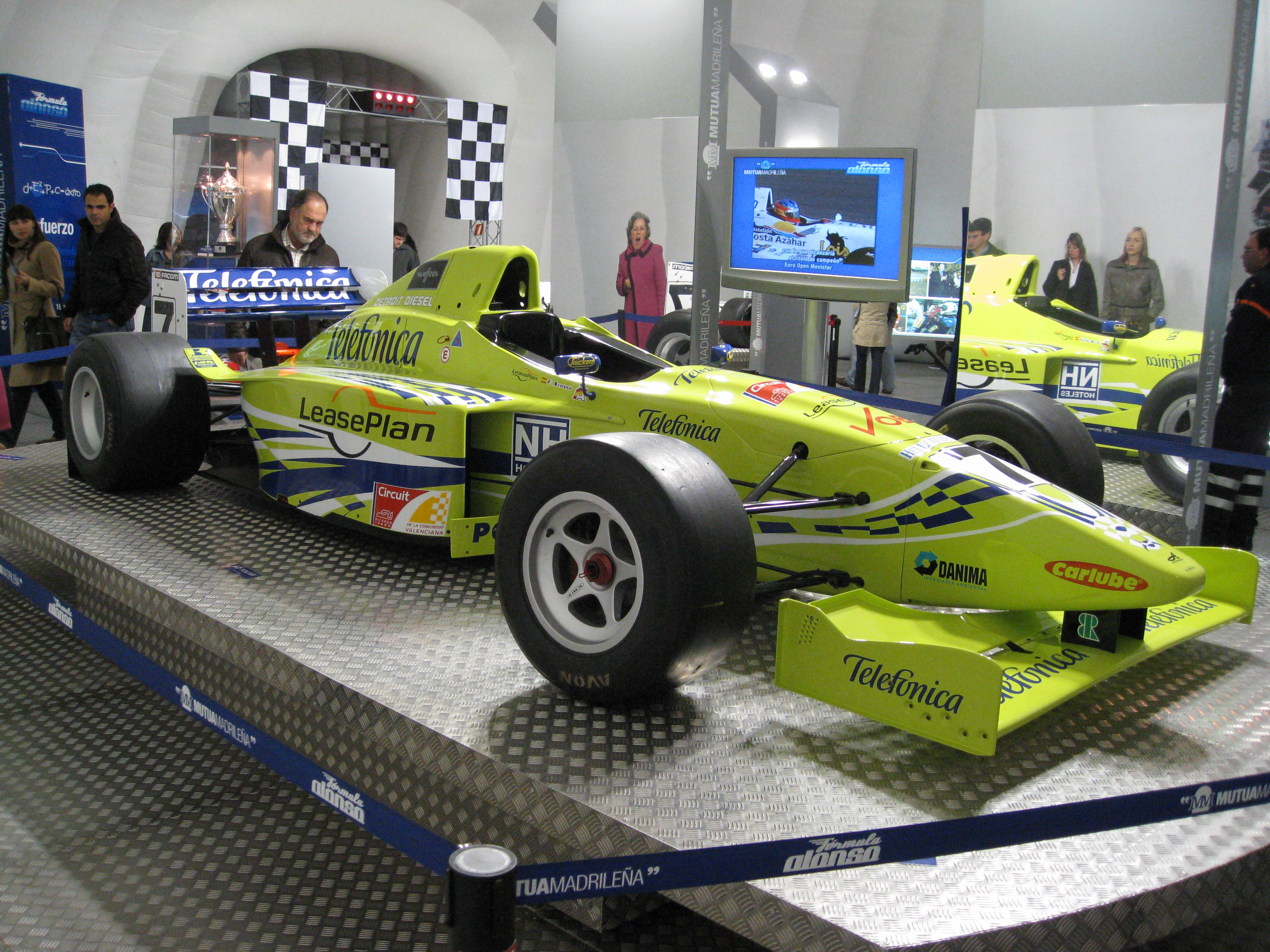
Fernando Alonso's Lola B99/50 chassis in the 2000 season.

The first chassis from March, Automobiles Gonfaronnaises Sportives (AGS) and Ralt were developments of their existing 1984 Formula Two designs, although Lola's entry was based on and looked very much like an Indy car. A few smaller teams tried obsolete three-litre Formula One cars (from Tyrrell, Williams, Minardi, Arrows and RAM), with little success—the Grand Prix and Indycar-derived entries were too unwieldy as their fuel tanks were about twice the size of those needed for F3000 races, and the weight distribution was not ideal. The first few years of the championship saw March establishing a superiority over Ralt and Lola—there was little to choose between the chassis, but more Marches were sold and ended up in better hands. In 1988, the ambitious Reynard marque entered with a brand new chassis; Reynard had won their first race in every formula they had previously entered, and did so again in F3000. The next couple of years saw Lola improve slightly—their car was competitive with the Reynard in 1990—and March slip, but both were crushed by the Reynard teams, and by the mid-90s, F3000 was a virtual Reynard monopoly, although Lola did eventually return with a promising car and the Japanese Footwork and Dome chassis were seen in Europe. Dallara briefly tried the series before moving up to Formula One, and AGS moved up from Formula Two but never recaptured their occasional success. At least one unraced F3000 chassis existed—the Wagner fitted with a straight-six short-stroke BMW. This was converted into a sports car, however.

== Politics ==
The series saw occasional controversy. Definitive rules for the 1985 season did not appear until the championship was well under way. In 1987 questions were asked about the ability of some of the drivers, given the high number of accidents in the formula. In 1989 the eligibility of the new Reynard chassis was challenged, as it was raced with a different nose to the one that had been crash tested. This season also saw problems with driver changes - the cost of F3000 was escalating to the point that teams were finding it difficult to run drivers for a whole season. A rule limiting driver changes to two per car per season meant that some cars had to sit idle while drivers with budgets could not race them. In 1991, some Italian teams started using Agip's so-called "jungle juice" Formula One fuel, worth an estimated 15 bhp, giving their drivers a significant advantage. In the early years of the formula there was much concern about safety, with a high number of accidents resulting in injuries to drivers. There was one fatality in the International Championship - Marco Campos in the final round of the 1995 series.

== Races ==
Formula 3000 races during the "open chassis" era tended to be of about 100–120 miles in distance, held at major circuits, either headlining meetings or paired with other international events. The "jewel in the crown" of the F3000 season was traditionally the Pau Grand Prix street race, rivalled for a few years by the Birmingham round. Most major circuits in France, Italy, Spain, Germany and the United Kingdom saw the series visit at least once.

== The spec-chassis years ==
In 1996, new rules introduced a single engine (a detuned Judd V8 engine, re-engineered by and badged as a Zytek) and chassis (Lola), to go along with tyre standardization (Avon) introduced in 1986. The following year the calendar was combined with that of Formula One, so the series became support races for the Grand Prix. Several Grand Prix teams established formal links with F3000 teams to develop young drivers (and engineering talent); these relationships varied from formal "junior teams" (such as the one McLaren set up for Nick Heidfeld) to fairly distant relationships based mostly upon shared sponsors and the use of the 'parent' team's name. The series grew dramatically through the late nineties, reaching an entry of nearly 40 cars - although this in itself was problematic as it meant many drivers failed to qualify. In 2000, the series was restricted to 15 teams of two cars each.

However, by 2002 expenses were once more very high and the number of entries, and sponsors, rapidly dwindled. International Formula 3000 was experiencing tough competition with cheaper formulas, such as European F3000 (using ex-FIA 1999 and 2002 Lola chassis), World Series by Nissan (also known as Formula Nissan) and Formula Renault V6 Eurocup. By the end of 2003, car counts had fallen to new lows.

The 2004 season was the last F3000 campaign, due in part to dwindling field sizes. In 2005 it was replaced with a new series known as GP2, with Renault backing.

=== Final year specifications ===
- Engine displacement: Zytek-Judd KV F3000 3.0 L (183 cu in) DOHC V8
- Power output: 450–520 hp (336–388 kW) @ 8,750-10,500 rpm (11,000 rpm redline)
- Torque output: 300 lb⋅ft (407 N⋅m)
- Gearbox: 6-speed paddle-shift sequential gearbox (must have reverse)
- Weight: 545 kg (1,202 lb) (including driver)
- Fuel: 102 RON unleaded
- Fuel delivery: Electronic-indirect fuel injection
- Aspiration: Naturally-aspirated
- Width: 1,476 mm (58 in)
- Wheelbase: 3,000 mm (118 in)
- Steering: Non-assisted rack and pinion

== Champions ==
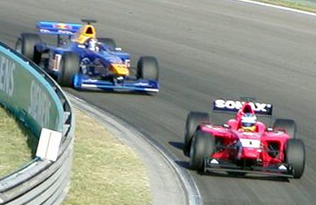
Sweden's Björn Wirdheim won the 2003 FIA Formula 3000 International Championship for Drivers

Season	Champion Driver	Team	Car	Champion Team	Car	Ref(s)
1985	(West Germany) Christian Danner	(United Kingdom) BS Automotive	March 85B-Cosworth	Not Awarded		
1986	(Italy) Ivan Capelli	(Italy) Genoa Racing	March 86B-Cosworth	Not Awarded		
1987	(Italy) Stefano Modena	(United Kingdom) Onyx	March 87B-Cosworth	Not Awarded		
1988	(Brazil) Roberto Moreno	(United Kingdom) Bromley Motorsport	Reynard 88D-Cosworth	Not Awarded		
1989	(France) Jean Alesi	(Republic of Ireland) Eddie Jordan Racing	Reynard 89D-Mugen	Not Awarded		
1990	(France) Érik Comas	(France) DAMS	Lola T90/50-Mugen	Not Awarded		
1991	(Brazil) Christian Fittipaldi	(United Kingdom) Pacific Racing	Reynard 91D-Mugen	Not Awarded		
1992	(Italy) Luca Badoer	(Italy) Crypton Engineering	Reynard 92D-Cosworth	Not Awarded		
1993	(France) Olivier Panis	(France) DAMS	Reynard 93D-Cosworth	Not Awarded		
1994	(France) Jean-Christophe Boullion	(France) DAMS	Reynard 94D-Cosworth	Not Awarded		
1995	(Italy) Vincenzo Sospiri	(United Kingdom) Super Nova Racing	Reynard 95D-Cosworth	Not Awarded		
1996	(Germany) Jörg Müller	(Austria) RSM Marko	Lola T96/50-Zytek	Not Awarded		
1997	(Brazil) Ricardo Zonta	(United Kingdom) Super Nova Racing	Lola T96/50-Zytek	Not Awarded		
1998	(Colombia) Juan Pablo Montoya	(United Kingdom) Super Nova Racing	Lola T96/50-Zytek	Not Awarded		
1999	(Germany) Nick Heidfeld	(United Kingdom) West Competition	Lola B99/50-Zytek	Not Awarded		
2000	(Brazil) Bruno Junqueira	(Brazil) Petrobras Junior Team	Lola B99/50-Zytek	(United Kingdom) D2 Playlife Super Nova	Lola B99/50-Zytek	
2001	(United Kingdom) Justin Wilson	(United Kingdom) Coca-Cola Nordic Racing	Lola B99/50-Zytek	(United Kingdom) Coca-Cola Nordic Racing	Lola B99/50-Zytek	
2002	(France) Sébastien Bourdais	(United Kingdom) Super Nova Racing	Lola B02/50-Zytek	(United Kingdom) Arden International	Lola B02/50-Zytek	
2003	(Sweden) Björn Wirdheim	(United Kingdom) Arden International	Lola B02/50-Zytek	(United Kingdom) Arden International	Lola B02/50-Zytek	
2004	(Italy) Vitantonio Liuzzi	(United Kingdom) Arden International	Lola B02/50-Zytek	(United Kingdom) Arden International	Lola B02/50-Zytek	

Three past F3000 champions (Müller, Junqueira and Wirdheim) have never been entered in an F1 race. Montoya and Bourdais became Champions in North American open-wheel (CART and Champ Car) respectively, with Fittipaldi, Moreno, Junqueira and Wilson also becoming race winners, and Danner and Wirdheim making the ranks. Müller became a BMW driver in WTCC touring car racing after having been a test driver for the BMW-Williams F1 project in 1999 as well as a racer of the BMW V12 LMR Le Mans winner. Sospiri attempted to qualify for one Formula One race but failed to make it, as part of the disastrous MasterCard Lola team. He later had a successful career in sportscars. Wirdheim was third driver in practice sessions for Jaguar Racing, but never participated in a race.

Three past F3000 champions have won an F1 Grand Prix: Alesi, Panis and Montoya (who also won the Indy 500).

== Related series ==
- Auto GP (formerly Italian Formula 3000, Superfund Euro Formula 3000 and Euro Formula 3000, Euroseries 3000), active 1999–2016.
- Super Formula (Japanese Formula 3000, Formula Nippon, active 1973 onwards (1987–1995 as Japanese F3000).
- British Formula 3000 (also known as British Formula Two), active 1989–1994 (1989–1992 as British F3000).
- OzBoss (formerly known as Australian Formula 4000, Formula 4000, Formula Holden and Formula Brabham), active 1989 onwards (used mostly F3000 chassis 1989–2006).
- American Racing Series/Indy Lights, active 1986 onwards (used F3000 chassis 1986–1992).
- Some F3000 cars raced in hillclimbs races in various countries of Europe (UK, France, etc.).
