= 1997 Mediterranean Grand Prix =

Motor race

(Italy) 1997 Mediterranean Grand Prix
Event Information
- Round 5 of 10 in the 1997
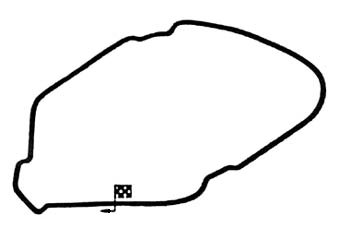
- Date: 19–20 July 1997
- Location: Enna, Sicily, Italy
- Venue: Enna-Pergusa

Results
Race 1
| Distance | 41 laps | 202.950 km |
| Pole position | (United Kingdom) Jamie Davies; DAMS | 1:32.846 |
| Winner | (United Kingdom) Jamie Davies; DAMS | 1:04:48.310 |

The 1997 Mediterranean Grand Prix was a motor race for International Formula 3000 held on the weekend of 19–20 July 1997. The event was held at Enna-Pergusa in Enna, Sicily, Italy, and consisted of one 202km race. It was the fifth round of ten in the 1997 International Formula 3000 Championship, as well as the 35th Mediterranean Grand Prix.

== Results ==
=== Qualifying ===
Drivers below the red line did not qualify for the race.

| Pos. | No. | Driver | Team | Time |
|---|---|---|---|---|
| 1 | 17 | (United Kingdom) Jamie Davies | DAMS | 1:32.846 |
| 2 | 3 | (Brazil) Ricardo Zonta | Super Nova Racing | +0.244 |
| 3 | 7 | (France) Cyrille Sauvage | Draco Racing | +0.478 |
| 4 | 12 | (Brazil) Max Wilson | Edenbridge Racing | +0.604 |
| 5 | 37 | (Uruguay) Gonzalo Rodríguez | Redman Bright | +0.775 |
| 6 | 2 | (Colombia) Juan Pablo Montoya | RSM Marko | +0.802 |
| 7 | 23 | (Portugal) Rui Águas | Nordic Racing | +0.881 |
| 8 | 26 | (Denmark) Jason Watt | Den Blå Avis | +0.956 |
| 9 | 14 | (Austria) Oliver Tichy | Pacific Racing | +0.985 |
| 10 | 21 | (Denmark) Tom Kristensen | Auto Sport Racing | +0.996 |
| 11 | 4 | (France) Laurent Redon | Super Nova Racing | +1.194 |
| 12 | 8 | (Portugal) Pedro Couceiro | Draco Racing | +1.401 |
| 13 | 36 | (Belgium) Kurt Mollekens | Keerbergs Transport Racing | +1.404 |
| 14 | 6 | (France) Soheil Ayari | Team Astromega | +1.421 |
| 15 | 22 | (Spain) Marc Gené | Nordic Racing | +1.447 |
| 16 | 1 | (Australia) Craig Lowndes | RSM Marko | +1.491 |
| 17 | 5 | (France) Boris Derichebourg | Team Astromega | +1.598 |
| 18 | 20 | (Argentina) Gastón Mazzacane | Auto Sport Racing | +1.614 |
| 19 | 33 | (Italy) Thomas Biagi | GP Racing | +1.653 |
| 20 | 18 | (South Africa) Stephen Watson | Durango Formula | +1.932 |
| 21 | 19 | (United Kingdom) Gareth Rees | Durango Formula | +1.938 |
| 22 | 11 | (South Africa) Werner Lupberger | Edenbridge Racing | +1.943 |
| 23 | 31 | (France) Anthony Beltoise | Ravarotto Racing | +1.986 |
| 24 | 16 | (France) Grégoire de Galzain | DAMS | +2.174 |
| 25 | 30 | (Argentina) Emiliano Spataro | Coloni Motorsport | +2.233 |
| 26 | 29 | (Austria) Markus Friesacher | Coloni Motorsport | +2.396 |
| 27 | 27 | (United Kingdom) David Cook | DC Cook Motorsport | +2.674 |
| 28 | 25 | (Norway) Thomas Schie | Bob Salisbury Engineering | +2.995 |
| 29 | 24 | (United Kingdom) James Taylor | Bob Salisbury Engineering | +4.447 |
| 30 | 35 | (United Kingdom) Christian Horner | Arden International | +4.484 |

=== Race ===
| Pos. | No. | Driver | Team | Laps | Time/Retired | Grid | Pts. |
|---|---|---|---|---|---|---|---|
| 1 | 17 | (United Kingdom) Jamie Davies | DAMS | 41 | 1:04:48.310 | 1 | 10 |
| 2 | 3 | (Brazil) Ricardo Zonta | Super Nova Racing | 41 | +24.262 | 2 | 6 |
| 3 | 12 | (Brazil) Max Wilson | Edenbridge Racing | 41 | +32.001 | 4 | 4 |
| 4 | 1 | (Australia) Craig Lowndes | RSM Marko | 41 | +32.987 | 15 | 3 |
| 5 | 36 | (Belgium) Kurt Mollekens | Keerbergs Transport Racing | 41 | +41.831 | 12 | 2 |
| 6 | 4 | (France) Laurent Redon | Super Nova Racing | 41 | +48.013 | 11 | 1 |
| 7 | 18 | (South Africa) Stephen Watson | Durango Formula | 41 | +56.859 | 19 | |
| 8 | 7 | (France) Cyrille Sauvage | Draco Racing | 41 | +1:33.893 | 3 | |
| 9 | 5 | (France) Boris Derichebourg | Team Astromega | 41 | +1:36.019 | 16 | |
| 10 | 22 | (Spain) Marc Gené | Nordic Racing | 40 | +1 lap | 14 | |
| 11 | 2 | (Colombia) Juan Pablo Montoya | RSM Marko | 40 | +1 lap | 6 | |
| 12 | 31 | (France) Anthony Beltoise | Ravarotto Racing | 40 | +1 lap | 22 | |
| 13 | 30 | (Argentina) Emiliano Spataro | Coloni Motorsport | 40 | +1 lap | 24 | |
| 14 | 33 | (Italy) Thomas Biagi | GP Racing | 40 | +1 lap | 18 | |
| 15 | 20 | (Argentina) Gastón Mazzacane | Auto Sport Racing | 40 | +1 lap | 17 | |
| 16 | 19 | (United Kingdom) Gareth Rees | Durango Formula | 40 | +1 lap | 20 | |
| 17 | 29 | (Austria) Markus Friesacher | Coloni Motorsport | 40 | +1 lap | 25 | |
| DNF | 6 | (France) Soheil Ayari | Team Astromega | 22 | | 13 | |
| DNF | 27 | (United Kingdom) David Cook^{1} | DC Cook Motorsport | 21 | | 26 | |
| DNF | 21 | (Denmark) Tom Kristensen | Auto Sport Racing | 17 | | 10 | |
| DNF | 37 | (Uruguay) Gonzalo Rodríguez | Redman Bright | 14 | Crash | 5 | |
| DNF | 16 | (France) Grégoire de Galzain | DAMS | 9 | | 23 | |
| DNF | 14 | (Austria) Oliver Tichy | Pacific Racing | 5 | | 9 | |
| DNF | 11 | (South Africa) Werner Lupberger | Edenbridge Racing | 5 | | 21 | |
| DNF | 23 | (Portugal) Rui Águas | Nordic Racing | 0 | Crash | 7 | |
| DNF | 26 | (Denmark) Jason Watt | Den Blå Avis | 0 | Crash | 8 | |
| WD | 8 | (Portugal) Pedro Couceiro | Draco Racing | | Crashed in warm-up | | |
Fastest Lap: Jamie Davies (DAMS), 1:33.500

- ^1 – David Cook did not qualify, but was allowed to start following Pedro Couceiro's withdrawal.

== Championship standings ==
Drivers' Championship standings

| Pos. | Driver | Points | Gap |
|---|---|---|---|
| 1 | (Denmark) Tom Kristensen | 18 | |
| 1 | (United Kingdom) Jamie Davies | 18 | |
| 3 | (Colombia) Juan Pablo Montoya | 11.5 | −6.5 |
| 4 | (Brazil) Ricardo Zonta | 11 | -7 |
| 4 | (France) Soheil Ayari | 11 | -7 |

- Note: Only the top five positions are included for both sets of standings.
