= 1997 Autosport International Trophy =

(United Kingdom) 1997 Autosport International Trophy
Event Information
- Round 1 of 10 in the 1997
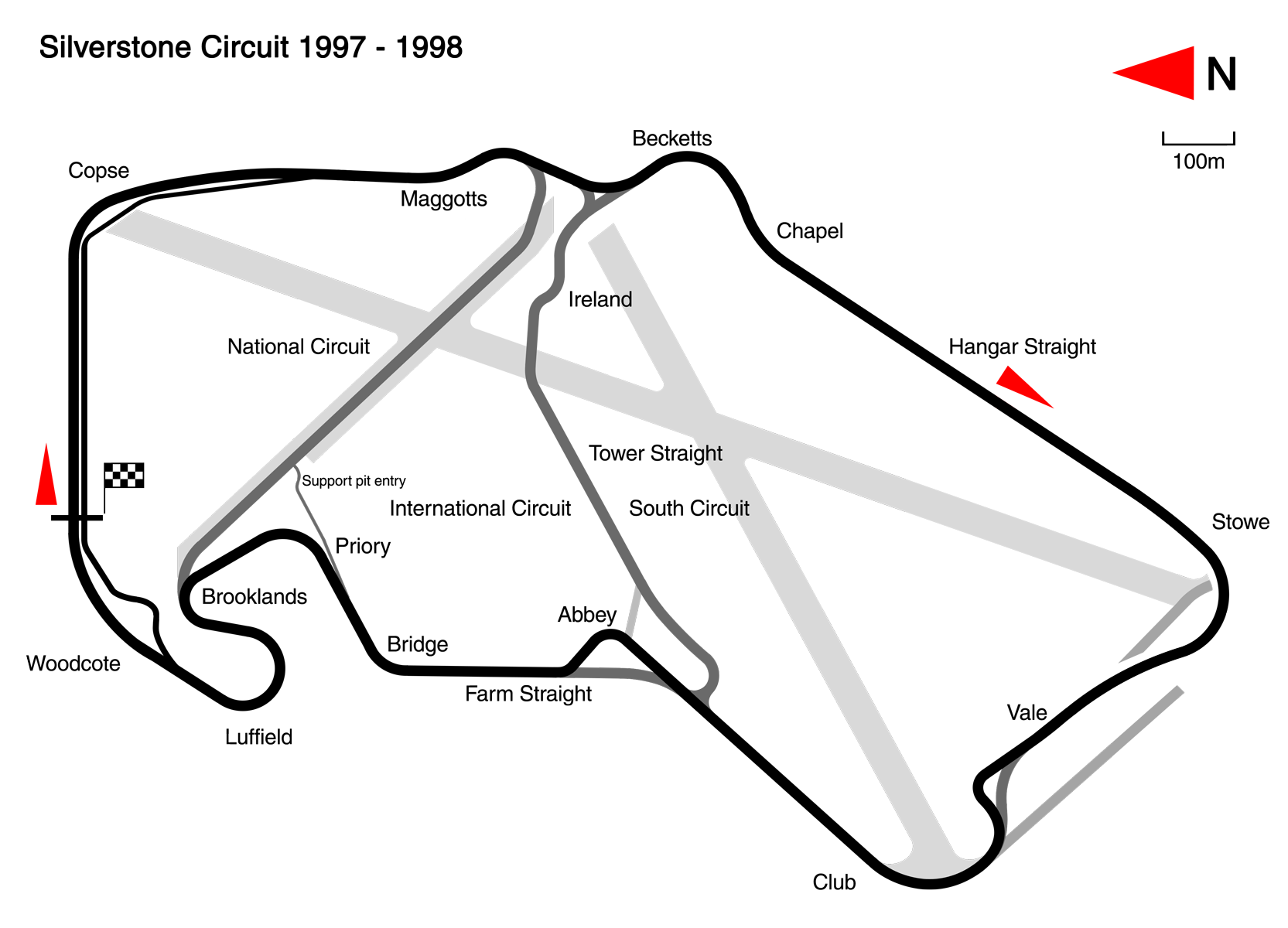
- Date: 10–11 May 1997
- Location: Silverstone, Northamptonshire, England
- Venue: Silverstone Circuit
- Weather: Damp

Results
Race 1
Distance	40 laps	205.640 km
Pole position	(Brazil) Ricardo Zonta; Super Nova Racing	1:40.463
Winner	(Denmark) Tom Kristensen; Auto Sport Racing	1:21:22.689

The 1997 Autosport International Trophy was a motor race for International Formula 3000 held on the weekend of 10–11 May 1997. The event was held at the Silverstone Circuit in Silverstone, Northamptonshire, United Kingdom, and consisted of one 205 km race. It was the opening round of ten in the 1997 International Formula 3000 Championship.

== Results ==
=== Qualifying ===
Drivers below the red line did not qualify for the race.

Pos.	No.	Driver	Team	Time
1	3	(Brazil) Ricardo Zonta	Super Nova Racing	1:40.463
2	2	(Colombia) Juan Pablo Montoya	RSM Marko	+0.169
3	26	(Denmark) Jason Watt	Den Blå Avis	+0.660
4	6	(France) Soheil Ayari	Team Astromega	+1.074
5	23	(Portugal) Rui Águas	Nordic Racing	+1.148
6	1	(Australia) Craig Lowndes	RSM Marko	+1.320
7	14	(Austria) Oliver Tichy	Pacific Racing	+1.387
8	12	(Brazil) Max Wilson	Edenbridge Racing	+1.448
9	20	(Argentina) Gastón Mazzacane	Auto Sport Racing	+1.482
10	4	(France) Laurent Redon	Super Nova Racing	+1.485
11	38	(United Kingdom) Dino Morelli	DKS Racing	+1.596
12	21	(Denmark) Tom Kristensen	Auto Sport Racing	+1.646
13	7	(France) Cyrille Sauvage	Draco Racing	+1.872
14	27	(United Kingdom) David Cook	DC Cook Motorsport	+2.012
15	19	(United Kingdom) Gareth Rees	Durango Formula	+2.021
16	15	(Spain) Marc Gené	Pacific Racing	+2.050
17	31	(France) Anthony Beltoise	Ravarotto Racing	+2.085
18	9	(France) Fabrizio Gollin	Apomatox	+2.087
19	10	(France) Jean-Philippe Belloc	Apomatox	+2.751
20	5	(France) Boris Derichebourg	Team Astromega	+2.990
21	18	(South Africa) Stephen Watson	Durango	+3.038
22	8	(Portugal) Pedro Couceiro	Draco Racing	+3.264
23	17	(United Kingdom) Jamie Davies	DAMS	+3.363
24	35	(United Kingdom) Christian Horner	Arden International	+3.462
25	32	(France) Patrick Lemarié	Ravarotto Racing	+3.604
26	11	(South Africa) Werner Lupberger	Edenbridge Racing	+3.751
27	29	(Austria) Markus Friesacher	Coloni Motorsport	+3.943
28	22	(Italy) Thomas Biagi	Nordic Racing	+3.988
29	16	(France) Grégoire de Galzain	DAMS	+4.104
30	24	(United Kingdom) Oliver Gavin	Bob Salisbury Engineering	+6.543
31	37	(Uruguay) Gonzalo Rodríguez	Redman Bright	+7.500
32	30	(Argentina) Emiliano Spataro	Coloni Motorsport	+13.098
33	25	(Norway) Thomas Schie	Bob Salisbury Engineering	+32.181
EXC	36	(Belgium) Kurt Mollekens	Keerbergs Transport Racing	Excluded^{1}

- ^1 – Mollekens was excluded from participating in the weekend having failed to attend the drivers' briefing.

=== Race ===
Pos.	No.	Driver	Team	Laps	Time/Retired	Grid	Pts.
1	21	(Denmark) Tom Kristensen	Auto Sport Racing	40	1:21:22.689	12	10
2	8	(Portugal) Pedro Couceiro	Draco Racing	40	+4.348	22	6
3	17	(United Kingdom) Jamie Davies	DAMS	40	+4.600	23	4
4	26	(Denmark) Jason Watt	Den Blå Avis	40	+7.692	3	3
5	38	(United Kingdom) Dino Morelli	DKS Racing	40	+9.207	11	2
6	32	(France) Patrick Lemarié	Ravarotto Racing	40	+10.041	25	1
7	7	(France) Cyrille Sauvage	Draco Racing	40	+10.679	13	
8	14	(Austria) Oliver Tichy	Pacific Racing	40	+17.826	7	
9	10	(France) Jean-Philippe Belloc	Apomatox	40	+30.462	19	
10	20	(Argentina) Gastón Mazzacane	Auto Sport Racing	40	+35.467	9	
11	11	(South Africa) Werner Lupberger	Edenbridge Racing	40	+52.288	26	
12	5	(France) Boris Derichebourg	Team Astromega	40	+1:04.380	20	
13	15	(Spain) Marc Gené	Pacific Racing	40	+1:30.894	16	
14	1	(Australia) Craig Lowndes	RSM Marko	39	+1 lap	6	
15	18	(South Africa) Stephen Watson	Durango	39	+1 lap	21	
16	35	(United Kingdom) Christian Horner	Arden International	39	+1 lap	24	
DSQ	3	(Brazil) Ricardo Zonta	Super Nova Racing	40	Gearbox	1	
DNF	6	(France) Soheil Ayari	Team Astromega	29	Spun out	4	
DNF	4	(France) Laurent Redon	Super Nova Racing	27		10	
DNF	2	(Colombia) Juan Pablo Montoya	RSM Marko	20		2	
DNF	12	(Brazil) Max Wilson	Edenbridge Racing	19	Crash damage	8	
DNF	19	(United Kingdom) Gareth Rees	Durango Formula	11	Crash	15	
DNF	23	(Portugal) Rui Águas	Nordic Racing	7	Spun out	5	
DNF	27	(United Kingdom) David Cook	DC Cook Motorsport	0	Crash	14	
DNF	31	(France) Anthony Beltoise	Ravarotto Racing	0		17	
DNF	9	(France) Fabrizio Gollin	Apomatox	0	Crash	18	
Fastest Lap: Marc Gené (Pacific Racing), 1:53.745

== Championship standings ==
Drivers' Championship standings

Pos.	Driver	Points
1	(Denmark) Tom Kristensen	10
2	(Portugal) Pedro Couceiro	6
3	(United Kingdom) Jamie Davies	4
4	(Denmark) Jason Watt	3
5	(United Kingdom) Dino Morelli	2

Teams' Championship standings

Pos.	Team	Points
1	(Italy) Auto Sport Racing	10
2	(Italy) Draco Racing	6
3	(France) DAMS	4
4	(Denmark) Den Blå Avis	3
5	(United Kingdom) DKS Racing	2

- Note: Only the top five positions are included for both sets of standings.
