= 1997 Pau Grand Prix =

(France) 1997 Pau Grand Prix
Event Information
- Round 2 of 10 in the 1997
- Date: 18–19 May 1997
- Location: Pau, Pyrénées-Atlantiques, France
- Venue: Circuit de Pau-Ville

Results
Race 1
Distance	75 laps	207.765 km
Pole position	(Colombia) Juan Pablo Montoya; RSM Marko	1:12.607
Winner	(Colombia) Juan Pablo Montoya; RSM Marko	1:32:44.230

The 1997 Pau Grand Prix was a motor race for International Formula 3000 held on the weekend of 18–19 May 1997. The event was held at the Circuit de Pau-Ville in Pau, Pyrénées-Atlantiques, France, and consisted of one 207km race. It was the second round of ten in the 1997 International Formula 3000 Championship, and the 56th running of the Pau Grand Prix.

== Results ==
=== Qualifying ===
Drivers below the red line did not qualify for the race.

Pos.	No.	Driver	Team	Time
1	2	(Colombia) Juan Pablo Montoya	RSM Marko	1:12.607
2	21	(Denmark) Tom Kristensen	Auto Sport Racing	+0.419
3	4	(France) Laurent Redon	Super Nova Racing	+0.545
4	17	(United Kingdom) Jamie Davies	DAMS	+0.588
5	6	(France) Soheil Ayari	Team Astromega	+0.680
6	7	(France) Cyrille Sauvage	Draco Racing	+0.663
7	8	(Portugal) Pedro Couceiro	Draco Racing	+0.763
8	3	(Brazil) Ricardo Zonta	Super Nova Racing	+0.933
9	14	(Austria) Oliver Tichy	Pacific Racing	+0.814
10	9	(France) Fabrizio Gollin	Apomatox	+0.988
11	12	(Brazil) Max Wilson	Edenbridge Racing	+1.040
12	23	(Portugal) Rui Águas	Nordic Racing	+1.035
13	36	(Belgium) Kurt Mollekens	Keerbergs Transport Racing	+1.220
14	19	(United Kingdom) Gareth Rees	Durango Formula	+1.101
15	26	(Denmark) Jason Watt	Den Blå Avis	+1.286
16	1	(Australia) Craig Lowndes	RSM Marko	+1.208
17	32	(France) Patrick Lemarié	Ravarotto Racing	+1.290
18	31	(France) Anthony Beltoise	Ravarotto Racing	+1.259
19	38	(United Kingdom) Dino Morelli	DKS Racing	+1.319
20	25	(Norway) Thomas Schie	Bob Salisbury Engineering	+1.302
21	5	(France) Boris Derichebourg	Team Astromega	+1.418
22	10	(France) Jean-Philippe Belloc	Apomatox	+1.480
23	20	(Argentina) Gastón Mazzacane	Auto Sport Racing	+1.557
24	18	(South Africa) Stephen Watson	Durango Formula	+1.757
25	22	(Italy) Thomas Biagi	Nordic Racing	+1.798
26	24	(United Kingdom) Oliver Gavin	Bob Salisbury Engineering	+1.914
27	11	(South Africa) Werner Lupberger	Edenbridge Racing	+1.987
28	30	(Argentina) Emiliano Spataro	Coloni Motorsport	+2.031
29	29	(Austria) Markus Friesacher	Coloni Motorsport	+2.301
30	27	(United Kingdom) David Cook	DC Cook Motorsport	+2.373
31	16	(France) Grégoire de Galzain	DAMS	+4.523
32	35	(United Kingdom) Christian Horner	Arden International	+4.863
DSQ	22	(Spain) Marc Gené	Pacific Racing	Disqualified

=== Race ===
Pos.	No.	Driver	Team	Laps	Time/Retired	Grid	Pts.
1	2	(Colombia) Juan Pablo Montoya	RSM Marko	75	1:32:44.230	1	10
2	21	(Denmark) Tom Kristensen	Auto Sport Racing	75	+35.073	2	6
3	17	(United Kingdom) Jamie Davies	DAMS	75	+37.200	4	4
4	4	(France) Laurent Redon	Super Nova Racing	75	+47.855	3	3
5	7	(France) Cyrille Sauvage	Draco Racing	75	+48.562	6	2
6	6	(France) Soheil Ayari	Team Astromega	75	+1:09.720	5	1
7	12	(Brazil) Max Wilson	Edenbridge Racing	75	+1:11.892	11	
8	14	(Austria) Oliver Tichy	Pacific Racing	75	+1:15.137	9	
9	23	(Portugal) Rui Águas	Nordic Racing	74	+1 lap	12	
10	36	(Belgium) Kurt Mollekens	Keerbergs Transport Racing	74	+1 lap	13	
11	38	(United Kingdom) Dino Morelli	DKS Racing	74	+1 lap	19	
12	26	(Denmark) Jason Watt	Den Blå Avis	74	+1 lap	15	
13	32	(France) Patrick Lemarié	Ravarotto Racing	74	+1 lap	17	
14	25	(Norway) Thomas Schie	Bob Salisbury Engineering	74	+1 lap	20	
15	5	(France) Boris Derichebourg	Team Astromega	74	+1 lap	21	
DNF	19	(United Kingdom) Gareth Rees	Durango Formula	57		14	
DNF	9	(France) Fabrizio Gollin	Apomatox	45		10	
DNF	1	(Australia) Craig Lowndes	RSM Marko	39		16	
DNF	31	(France) Anthony Beltoise	Ravarotto Racing	37		18	
DNF	10	(France) Jean-Philippe Belloc	Apomatox	15		22	
DNF	3	(Brazil) Ricardo Zonta	Super Nova Racing	2	Crash	8	
DNF	8	(Portugal) Pedro Couceiro	Draco Racing	2	Crash	7	
Fastest Lap: Juan Pablo Montoya (RSM Marko), 1:12.697

== Championship standings ==
Drivers' Championship standings

Pos.	Driver	Points	Gap
1	(Denmark) Tom Kristensen	12	
2	(Colombia) Juan Pablo Montoya	10	−2
3	(United Kingdom) Jamie Davies	8	−8
4	(Portugal) Pedro Couceiro	6	−10
5	(Denmark) Jason Watt	3	-13
5	(France) Laurent Redon	3	-13

Teams' Championship standings

Pos.	Team	Points	Gap
1	(Italy) Auto Sport Racing	16	
2	(Austria) RSM Marko	10	−6
3	(France) DAMS	8	-8
3	(Italy) Draco Racing	8	-8
5	(United Kingdom) Super Nova Racing	6	−10

- Note: Only the top five positions are included for both sets of standings.
