= 1998 International Formula 3000 Championship =

Motor racing competition

The 1998 International Formula 3000 Championship was the thirty-second season of the second-tier of Formula One feeder championship and also fourteenth season under the International Formula 3000 Championship moniker. The championship was contested over twelve rounds from 11 April to 26 September 1998.

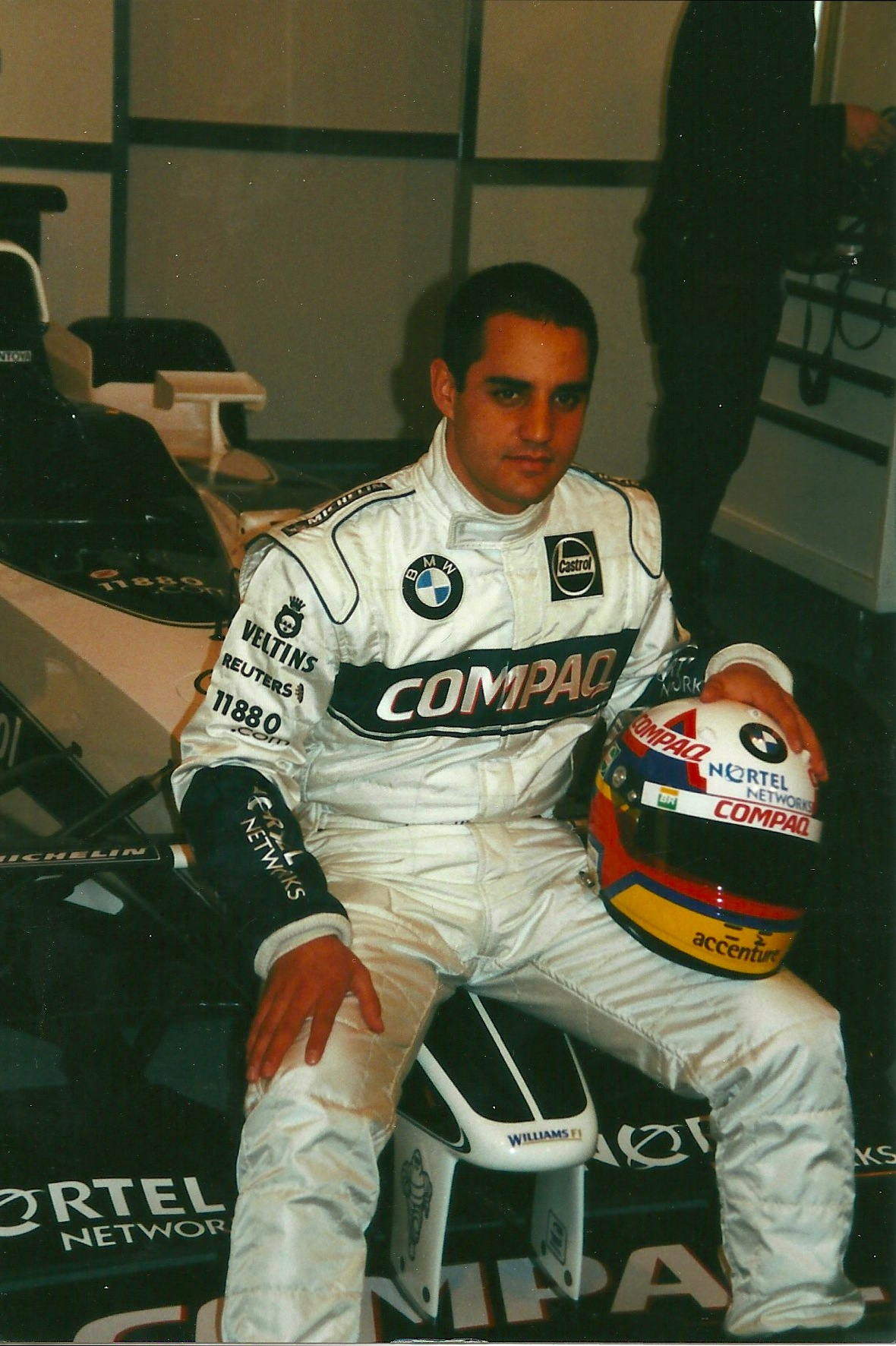
The Drivers' Championship was won by Colombian Juan Pablo Montoya (pictured in 2001), of Super Nova Racing, who won four races

== Drivers and teams ==
Team	No.	Driver	Rounds
(United Kingdom) Super Nova Racing	1	(Colombia) Juan Pablo Montoya	All
(United Kingdom) Super Nova Racing	2	(France) Boris Derichebourg	All
(Denmark) Den Blå Avis	3	(Denmark) Jason Watt	All
(Denmark) Den Blå Avis	4	(United Kingdom) Gareth Rees	All
(United Kingdom) Edenbridge Racing	5	(Brazil) Max Wilson	All
(United Kingdom) Edenbridge Racing	6	(South Africa) Werner Lupberger	All
(France) DAMS	7	(United Kingdom) Jamie Davies	All
(France) DAMS	8	(France) Grégoire de Galzain	All
(Italy) Auto Sport Racing	9	(Portugal) Rui Águas	1
(Italy) Auto Sport Racing	9	(United Kingdom) Dino Morelli	2-5
(Italy) Auto Sport Racing	9	(Czech Republic) Tomáš Enge	8-12
(Italy) Auto Sport Racing	10	(Italy) Oliver Martini	All
(Belgium) Team Astromega	11	(Argentina) Gastón Mazzacane	All
(Belgium) Team Astromega	12	(Uruguay) Gonzalo Rodríguez	All
(Italy) Draco Engineering	14	(Brazil) Bruno Junqueira	All
(Italy) Draco Engineering	15	(Italy) Giovanni Montanari	All
(United Kingdom) Nordic Racing	16	(France) Fabrice Walfisch	All
(United Kingdom) Nordic Racing	17	(Argentina) Brian Smith	1-6
(United Kingdom) Nordic Racing	17	(United Kingdom) Kevin McGarrity	7-9
(United Kingdom) Nordic Racing	17	(Japan) Hidetoshi Mitsusada	10-12
(Italy) Coloni Motorsport	18	(Italy) Giorgio Vinella	1-7, 9-12
(Italy) Coloni Motorsport	18	(Portugal) Rui Águas	8
(Italy) Coloni Motorsport	19	(Italy) Thomas Biagi	1-2
(Italy) Coloni Motorsport	19	(Portugal) Rui Águas	3-6
(Italy) Coloni Motorsport	19	(Austria) Oliver Tichy	7-12
(Italy) Durango Formula	20	(Canada) Bertrand Godin	All
(Italy) Durango Formula	21	(France) Soheil Ayari	All
(United Kingdom) Arden Racing (Belgium) KTR	22	(United Kingdom) Christian Horner	All
(United Kingdom) Arden Racing (Belgium) KTR	23	(Belgium) Kurt Mollekens	1-8, 10-12
(United Kingdom) Redman & Bright F3000	24	(United Kingdom) Jonny Kane	1-4
(United Kingdom) Redman & Bright F3000	24	(United Kingdom) David Cook	7-9
(United Kingdom) Redman & Bright F3000	25	(United Kingdom) Mark Shaw	All
(United Kingdom) Bob Salisbury Engineering	26	(United Kingdom) Dino Morelli	None, on entry list only
(United Kingdom) Bob Salisbury Engineering	27	(United Kingdom) James Taylor	None, on entry list only
(France) Apomatox	28	(France) Stéphane Sarrazin	All
(France) Apomatox	29	(Brazil) Marcelo Battistuzzi	All
(United Kingdom) West Competition	30	(Germany) Nick Heidfeld	All
(United Kingdom) West Competition	31	(France) Nicolas Minassian	1-11
(United Kingdom) West Competition	31	(Belgium) Bas Leinders	12
(France) RTL Team Oreca	32	(Germany) Alex Müller	All
(France) RTL Team Oreca	33	(Germany) Dominik Schwager	All
(Italy) Prema Powerteam	34	(Portugal) André Couto	All
(Italy) Prema Powerteam	35	(Brazil) André Gaidzinski	None, on entry list only
(Italy) Prema Powerteam	35	(Italy) Paolo Ruberti	1-6
(Italy) Prema Powerteam	35	(Italy) Thomas Biagi	7-12
(Italy) GP Racing	36	(Italy) Paolo Ruberti	None, on entry list only
(Italy) GP Racing	36	(France) Cyrille Sauvage	1-10
(Italy) GP Racing	36	(United Kingdom) James Taylor	11-12
(United Kingdom) Raceprep Motorsport	37	(United Kingdom) Kevin McGarrity	1-5
(Italy) G. S. Team	38	(Italy) Fabrizio Gollin	All
(Italy) G. S. Team	39	(France) Cyrille Sauvage	None, on entry list only
(Spain) Elide Racing	40	(Spain) Polo Villaamil	1, 3

== Calendar ==
1998 was the last International F3000 season where races were held independently from Formula One Grands Prix. Pau and Pergusa had held International F3000 and previously European Formula Two Championship races uninterruptedly since 1972.

Round	Circuit	Date	Laps	Distance	Time	Speed	Pole position	Fastest lap	Winner	Winning team	Report
1	(Germany) Motorsport Arena Oschersleben	10 April	56	3.667=205.352 km	1'24:52.384	145.171 km/h	(Colombia) Juan Pablo Montoya	(Colombia) Juan Pablo Montoya	(France) Stéphane Sarrazin	(France) Apomatox	Report
2	(Italy) Autodromo Enzo e Dino Ferrari	25 April	42	4.93=207.06 km	1'16:38.513	162.099 km/h	(Colombia) Juan Pablo Montoya	(Uruguay) Gonzalo Rodríguez	(Denmark) Jason Watt	(Denmark) Den Blå Avis	Report
3	(Spain) Circuit de Catalunya	9 May	44	4.728=208.032 km	1'12:50.057	171.272 km/h	(Colombia) Juan Pablo Montoya	(Germany) Nick Heidfeld	(Colombia) Juan Pablo Montoya	(United Kingdom) Super Nova Racing	Report
4	(United Kingdom) Silverstone Circuit	16 May	40	5.14=205.60 km	1'10:08.886	175.857 km/h	(Colombia) Juan Pablo Montoya	(Colombia) Juan Pablo Montoya	(Colombia) Juan Pablo Montoya	(United Kingdom) Super Nova Racing	Report
5	Circuit de Monaco	23 May	50	3.367=168.35 km	1'18:04.956	129.363 km/h	(Denmark) Jason Watt	(Colombia) Juan Pablo Montoya	(Germany) Nick Heidfeld	(United Kingdom) West Competition	Report
6	(France) Pau Grand Prix	1 June	75	2.76=207.00 km	1'33:10.179	133.305 km/h	(Colombia) Juan Pablo Montoya	(Colombia) Juan Pablo Montoya	(Colombia) Juan Pablo Montoya	(United Kingdom) Super Nova Racing	Report
7	(Austria) A1-Ring	25 July	43	4.319=185.717 km	1'11:04.222	175.019 km/h	(France) Soheil Ayari	(France) Soheil Ayari	(France) Soheil Ayari	(Italy) Durango Formula	Report
8	(Germany) Hockenheimring	1 August	31	6.823=211.513 km	1'12:57.599	173.942 km/h	(Germany) Nick Heidfeld	(Germany) Nick Heidfeld	(Germany) Nick Heidfeld	(United Kingdom) West Competition	Report
9	(Hungary) Budapest	15 August	52	3.972=206.544 km	1'20:14.689	154.435 km/h	(France) Stéphane Sarrazin	(Germany) Nick Heidfeld	(Germany) Nick Heidfeld	(United Kingdom) West Competition	Report
10	(Belgium) Circuit de Spa-Francorchamps	29 August	29	6.968=202.072 km	1'03:10.530	191.900 km/h	(Colombia) Juan Pablo Montoya	(France) Soheil Ayari	(Uruguay) Gonzalo Rodríguez	(Belgium) Team Astromega	Report
11	(Italy) Autodromo di Pergusa	6 September	41	4.95=202.95 km	1'04:29.540	188.813 km/h	(Germany) Nick Heidfeld	(Colombia) Juan Pablo Montoya	(Colombia) Juan Pablo Montoya	(United Kingdom) Super Nova Racing	Report
12	(Germany) Nürburgring	26 September	45	4.556=205.02 km	1'12:37.085	169.381 km/h	(Colombia) Juan Pablo Montoya	(Uruguay) Gonzalo Rodríguez	(Uruguay) Gonzalo Rodríguez	(Belgium) Team Astromega	Report

== Season summary ==
After winning the 1997 championship with Ricardo Zonta, Super Nova Racing chose to recruit championship runner-up Juan Pablo Montoya to lead their main team, and also expanded their second Den Blå Avis team to two cars by hiring Gareth Rees to partner Jason Watt. Montoya's former team RSM Marko did not compete in 1998, but there were new entries from GT specialists Oreca and the new West Competition team, established as a McLaren junior team and run by former Williams race engineer David Brown.

With seven pole positions, Montoya was the fastest man in the championship all season, but a poor start to the season left him trailing several title rivals. In the event, the championship turned into a duel between the Colombian and newcomer Nick Heidfeld, who remained consistent throughout the season despite his relative inexperience. Watt often matched their pace but made several key mistakes costing him points, while Uruguay's Gonzalo Rodriguez finished the season strongly with two wins in the last three races, becoming the first driver from the South American nation to win a Formula 3000 event.

Montoya led Heidfeld by three points going into the final round at the Nürburgring. However, after qualifying second on the grid, Heidfeld's times were deleted and he was relegated to the back of the grid, only making the race after Brown withdrew his new teammate Bas Leinders from the event. Despite recovering through the field, Heidfeld failed to climb into the top six, and Montoya's third-place finish clinched him the championship. Rodriguez beat Watt to the race win and third place in the standings.

Montoya moved to the North American CART series for 1999 with Chip Ganassi Racing, going on to win the championship as a rookie. He went on to graduate to Formula One with Williams in 2001, and became the only International Formula 3000 champion to win more than one grand prix in his career. The only driver from the field to participate in Formula One in 1999 was Stéphane Sarrazin, who secured a one-off drive in the Brazilian Grand Prix for Minardi in place of the injured Luca Badoer. Most of the leading Formula 3000 drivers instead remained in the series for 1999.

== Drivers' Championship ==
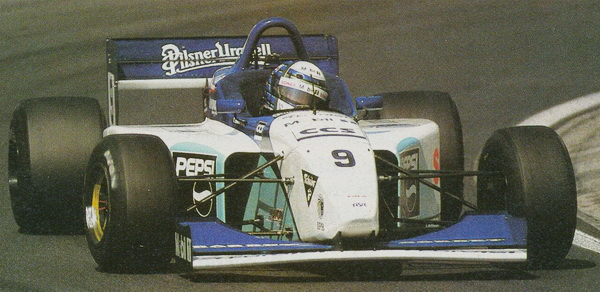
Tomas Enge placed 22nd in the championship driving for Auto Sport Racing

Pos	Driver	OSC (Germany)	IML (Italy)	CAT (Spain)	SIL (United Kingdom)	MON (Monaco)	PAU (France)	A1R (Austria)	HOC (Germany)	HUN (Hungary)	SPA (Belgium)	PER (Italy)	NÜR (Germany)	Points
1	(Colombia) Juan Pablo Montoya	**15**	**Ret**	**1**	**1**	6	**1**	2	3	3	**2**	1	**3**	65
2	(Germany) Nick Heidfeld	2	4	26	2	1	3	7	**1**	1	4	**2**	9	58
3	(Uruguay) Gonzalo Rodríguez	Ret	3	21	Ret	2	Ret	4	11	7	1	Ret	1	33
4	(Denmark) Jason Watt	7	1	7	3	**Ret**	Ret	3	2	10	8	Ret	2	30
5	(France) Soheil Ayari	Ret	Ret	5	Ret	DNQ	Ret	**1**	Ret	Ret	3	3	Ret	20
6	(France) Stéphane Sarrazin	1	24	15	24	4	Ret	8	Ret	**2**	Ret	Ret	19	19
7	(Belgium) Kurt Mollekens	Ret	2	2	8	5	5	10	Ret		DNQ	8	4	19
8	(United Kingdom) Gareth Rees	Ret	Ret	Ret	4	Ret	4	Ret	6	DNS	12	4	Ret	10
9	(Brazil) Max Wilson	Ret	Ret	6	5	DNPQ	2	Ret	Ret	Ret	13	Ret	Ret	9
10	(United Kingdom) Jamie Davies	3	8	13	16	3	Ret	Ret	16	15	15	7	14	8
11	(Portugal) André Couto	Ret	5	14	Ret	Ret	6	Ret	Ret	5	14	9	5	7
12	(France) Boris Derichebourg	11	6	3	12	Ret	Ret	15	7	Ret	17	11	Ret	5
13	(France) Nicolas Minassian	Ret	19	Ret	7	9	7	5	Ret	4	19	19		5
14	(Germany) Dominik Schwager	14	11	4	14	10	DNQ	Ret	14	18	Ret	Ret	7	3
15	(Italy) Thomas Biagi	4	10					12	10	13	10	Ret	12	3
16	(United Kingdom) Kevin McGarrity	DNQ	14	27	Ret	DNQ		Ret	4	Ret				3
17	(Italy) Oliver Martini	16	9	9	Ret	DNPQ	10	9	13	6	9	5	Ret	3
18	(Brazil) Bruno Junqueira	Ret	16	16	9	Ret	Ret	6	5	Ret	Ret	18	Ret	3
19	(France) Cyrille Sauvage	5	Ret	11	Ret	15	Ret	13	Ret	8	20			2
20	(Germany) Alex Müller	Ret	Ret	10	11	Ret	Ret	11	Ret	20	5	20	13	2
21	(Argentina) Gastón Mazzacane	6	7	Ret	6	12	9	Ret	Ret	Ret	DNQ	13	Ret	2
22	(Czech Republic) Tomáš Enge								15	12	7	Ret	6	1
23	(South Africa) Werner Lupberger	Ret	13	12	18	14	Ret	16	8	17	11	6	Ret	1
24	(Brazil) Marcelo Battistuzzi	DNQ	22	Ret	Ret	Ret	DNQ	18	Ret	11	6	Ret	Ret	1
25	(Portugal) Rui Águas	9		17	17	7	Ret		Ret					0
26	(Argentina) Brian Smith	10	Ret	Ret	15	11	8							0
27	(Italy) Giovanni Montanari	Ret	15	8	13	13	Ret	14	Ret	19	16	Ret	10	0
28	(United Kingdom) Dino Morelli		Ret	19	10	8								0
29	(Canada) Bertrand Godin	8	Ret	22	19	Ret	DNQ	19	12	14	21	12	11	0
30	(France) Fabrice Walfisch	13	18	20	Ret	DNQ	DNQ	Ret	Ret	Ret	22	Ret	8	0
31	(Austria) Oliver Tichy							22	9	9	18	Ret	Ret	0
32	(France) Grégoire de Galzain	DNQ	Ret	18	23	DNPQ	DNQ	Ret	17	Ret	25	10	16	0
33	(United Kingdom) Christian Horner	Ret	12	Ret	Ret	16	DNQ	17	18	Ret	DNQ	17	17	0
34	(United Kingdom) Jonny Kane	12	21	Ret	20									0
35	(Italy) Fabrizio Gollin	DNQ	17	DNQ	Ret	Ret	DNQ	21	DNQ	Ret	DNQ	14	Ret	0
36	(Italy) Giorgio Vinella	DNQ	Ret	25	22	DNQ	DNQ	Ret		21	DNQ	15	22	0
37	(Japan) Hidetoshi Mitsusada										23	Ret	15	0
38	(United Kingdom) Mark Shaw	Ret	20	Ret	Ret	DNPQ	DNQ	20	19	16	24	16	18	0
39	(Italy) Paolo Ruberti	DSQ	Ret	23	21	18	Ret							0
40	(United Kingdom) James Taylor											21	21	0
41	(Spain) Polo Villaamil	DNQ		24										0
–	(United Kingdom) David Cook							Ret	DNQ	DNS				0
–	(Belgium) Bas Leinders												DNS	0
Pos	Driver	OSC (Germany)	IML (Italy)	CAT (Spain)	SIL (United Kingdom)	MON (Monaco)	PAU (France)	A1R (Austria)	HOC (Germany)	HUN (Hungary)	SPA (Belgium)	PER (Italy)	NÜR (Germany)	Points

Colour	Result
Gold	Winner
Silver	Second place
Bronze	Third place
Green	Points classification
Blue	Non-points classification
Blue	Non-classified finish (NC)
Purple	Retired, not classified (Ret)
Red	Did not qualify (DNQ)
Red	Did not pre-qualify (DNPQ)
Black	Disqualified (DSQ)
White	Did not start (DNS)
White	Withdrew (WD)
White	Race cancelled (C)
Blank	Did not practice (DNP)
Blank	Did not arrive (DNA)
Blank	Excluded (EX)

**Bold** – Pole
Italics – Fastest lap

=== Notes ===
- All drivers used Lola T96/50 chassis, with Zytek-Judd V8 engines, and Avon tyres.
- Paolo Ruberti was disqualified from third place at Oschersleben due to a bodywork infringement.

== Complete overview ==
first column of every race	10	= grid position

second column of every race	10	= race result

R22=retired, but classified R=retired NC=not classified NS=did not start NQ=did not qualify DIS(3)=disqualified after finishing in third place (16)=place after practice, but grid position not held free

Place	Name	Team	OSC (Germany)		IMO (Italy)		CAT (Spain)		SIL (United Kingdom)		MON (Monaco)		PAU (France)		OST (Austria)		HOC (Germany)		HUN (Hungary)		SPA (Belgium)		PER (Italy)		NÜR (Germany)
1	(Colombia) Juan Pablo Montoya	SuperNova Racing	1	15	1	R	1	1	1	1	7	6	1	1	2	2	10	3	2	3	1	2	3	1	1	3
2	(Germany) Nick Heidfeld	West Competition Team	2	2	5	4	3	26	2	2	2	1	6	3	13	7	1	1	3	1	2	4	1	2	32	9
3	(Uruguay) Gonzalo Rodríguez	Team Astromega	5	R	2	3	27	21	9	R26	3	2	2	R	6	4	6	11	11	7	6	1	7	R22	2	1
4	(Denmark) Jason Watt	Den Blå Avis	11	7	3	1	11	7	3	3	1	R	5	R	4	3	4	2	10	10	20	8	2	R	3	2
5	(France) Soheil Ayari	Durango Formula	4	R	6	R23	2	5	17	R	30	NQ	3	R	1	1	3	R	19	R	3	3	4	3	5	R
6	(France) Stéphane Sarrazin	Apomatox	18	1	18	R24	25	15	25	24	4	4	16	R	8	8	5	R	1	2	7	R	18	R	10	19
	(Belgium) Kurt Mollekens	KTR/Arden	9	R	4	2	5	2	14	8	8	5	11	5	9	10	11	R	-	-	31	NQ	15	8	4	4
8	(United Kingdom) Gareth Rees	Den Blå Avis	25	R	15	R	33	R30	4	4	11	R17	8	4	3	R	13	6	20	R	16	12	6	4	20	20
9	(Brazil) Max Wilson	Edenbridge Racing	3	NC	7	R	9	6	6	5	33	NQ	7	2	21	R	2	R	17	R	19	13	8	R	23	23
10	(United Kingdom) Jamie Davies	DAMS	27	3	26	8	16	13	19	16	5	3	9	R	14	R	25	16	25	15	13	15	10	7	17	14
11	(Portugal) André Couto	Prema Powerteam	10	R	11	5	24	14	20	R	6	R	14	6	18	R	22	R	6	5	15	14	24	9	6	5
12	(France) Boris Derichebourg	SuperNova Racing	23	11	8	6	6	3	15	12	18	R	4	R	15	15	21	7	9	R	18	17	22	11	13	R
	(France) Nicolas Minassian	West Competition Team	15	NC	16	19	8	R	8	7	16	9	21	7	7	5	7	21	7	4	12	19	17	19	-	-
14	(Italy) Thomas Biagi	Coloni Motorsport	20	4	24	10	-	-	-	-	-	-	-	-
14	(Italy) Thomas Biagi	Prema Powerteam													17	12	18	10	18	13	8	10	5	R	25	12
	(Germany) Dominik Schwager	RTL Team Oreca	7	14	14	11	4	4	16	14	19	10	25	NQ	28	R	14	14	22	18	21	R	27	R	11	7
	(United Kingdom) Kevin McGarrity	Raceprep Motorsport	31	NQ	30	14	35	27	31	R	27	NQ	-	-
	(United Kingdom) Kevin McGarrity	Nordic Racing													33	R	15	4	31	2	-	-	-	-	-	-
	(Brazil) Bruno Junqueira	Draco Engineering	14	R	23	16	26	16	7	9	9	R	12	R	5	6	9	5	14	R	22	R	13	18	8	R
	(Italy) Oliver Martini	Auto Sport Racing	19	R	17	9	12	9	29	R27	34	NQ	20	10	11	9	26	13	5	6	11	9	11	5	9	R
19	(France) Cyrille Sauvage	GP Racing	17	5	9	R	15	11	27	R	12	15	10	R	12	13	16	R	8	8	10	20	-	-	-	-
	(Argentina) Gastón Mazzacane	Team Astromega	22	6	12	7	22	A28	5	6	22	R	13	9	22	R	24	R	16	R	33	NQ	25	13	7	R
	(Germany) Alex Müller	RTL Team Oreca	13	R	20	R	13	10	13	11	14	R	22	R	13	7	19	11	8	20	23	20	4	5	14	13
22	(Brazil) Marcelo Battistuzzi	Apomatox	34	NQ	25	22	30	R	34	R	25	R	27	NQ	29	18	17	R	12	11	9	6	23	R	24	R
	(South Africa) Werner Lupberger	Edenbridge Racing	28	R	27	13	10	12	28	18	23	14	18	R	20	16	12	8	24	17	14	11	9	6	21	R
	(Czech Republic) Tomáš Enge	Auto Sport Racing	-	-	-	-	-	-	-	-	-	-	-	-	-	-	23	15	15	12	5	7	16	R	15	6
-	(Portugal) Rui Águas	Auto Sport Racing	24	9	-	-
-	(Portugal) Rui Águas	Coloni Motorsport					14	17	23	17	10	7	17	R	-	-	32	R	-	-	-	-	-	-	-	-
-	(Argentina) Brian Smith	Nordic Racing	6	10	10	R	28	R31	12	15	15	11	19	8	-	-	-	-	-	-	-	-	-	-	-	-
-	(Italy) Giovanni Montanari	Draco Engineering	16	R	29	15	7	8	10	13	21	13	23	R	16	14	19	R	26	19	26	16	26	R	16	10
-	(United Kingdom) Dino Morelli	Auto Sport Racing	-	-	19	R	21	19	11	10	17	9	-	-	-	-	-	-	-	-	-	-	-	-	-	-
-	(Canada) Bertrand Godin	Durango Formula	12	8	32	R	20	22	22	19	24	R	24	NQ	26	19	27	12	21	14	24	21	31	12	18	11
-	(France) Fabrice Walfisch	Nordic Racing	29	13	31	18	31	20	32	25	28	NQ	31	NQ	24	R	29	R	13	R	27	22	21	R	12	8
-	(Austria) Oliver Tichy	Coloni Motorsport	-	-	-	-	-	-	-	-	-	-	-	-	10	22	20	9	4	9	17	18	20	R	22	R
-	(France) Grégoire de Galzain	DAMS	32	NQ	35	R	17	18	35	23	32	NQ	28	NQ	25	R	30	17	28	R	23	25	14	10	28	16
-	(United Kingdom) Christian Horner	KTR/Arden	30	R	22	12	19	R	26	R	26	16	30	NQ	23	17	28	18	32	R	30	NQ	29	17	29	17
-	(United Kingdom) Jonny Kane	Redman & Bright F3000	21	12	13	21	18	R29	18	20	-	-	-	-	-	-	-	-	-	-	-	-	-	-	-	-
-	(Italy) Fabrizio Gollin	G. S. Team	35	NQ	28	17	36	R	30	R	20	R	29	NQ	30	21	33	NQ	30	R	32	NQ	28	14	26	R
-	(Italy) Giorgio Vinella	Coloni Motorsport	33	NQ	34	R	32	25	33	22	29	NQ	32	NQ	31	R	-	-	29	21	29	R	30	15	30	22
-	(Japan) Hidetoshi Mitsusada	Coloni Motorsport	-	-	-	-	-	-	-	-	-	-	-	-	-	-	-	-	-	-	28	23	19	R	19	15
-	(United Kingdom) Mark Shaw	Redman & Bright F3000	26	R	33	20	29	R	21	R	31	NQ	26	NQ	27	20	31	19	27	16	25	24	32	16	27	18
-	(Italy) Paolo Ruberti	Prema Powerteam	8	DIS(3)	21	R	23	23	24	21	13	18	15	R	-	-	-	-	-	-	-	-	-	-	-	-
-	(United Kingdom) James Taylor	GP Racing	-	-	-	-	-	-	-	-	-	-	-	-	-	-	-	-	-	-	-	-	33	21	31	21
-	(Spain) Polo Villaamil	Elide Racing	36	NQ	-	-	34	24	-	-	-	-	-	-	-	-	-	-	-	-	-	-	-	-	-	-
-	(United Kingdom) David Cook	Redman & Bright F3000	-	-	-	-	-	-	-	-	-	-	-	-	32	R	34	NQ	33	NS	-	-	-	-	-	-
-	(Belgium) Bas Leinders	West Competition Team	-	-	-	-	-	-	-	-	-	-	-	-	-	-	-	-	-	-	-	-	-	-	(16)	NS
