= 1997 International Formula 3000 Championship =

Motor racing competition

The 1997 International Formula 3000 season was the thirty-first season of the second-tier of Formula One feeder championship and also thirteenth season under the International Formula 3000 Championship moniker. The championship was a ten-round series contested from 11 May to 25 October 1997.

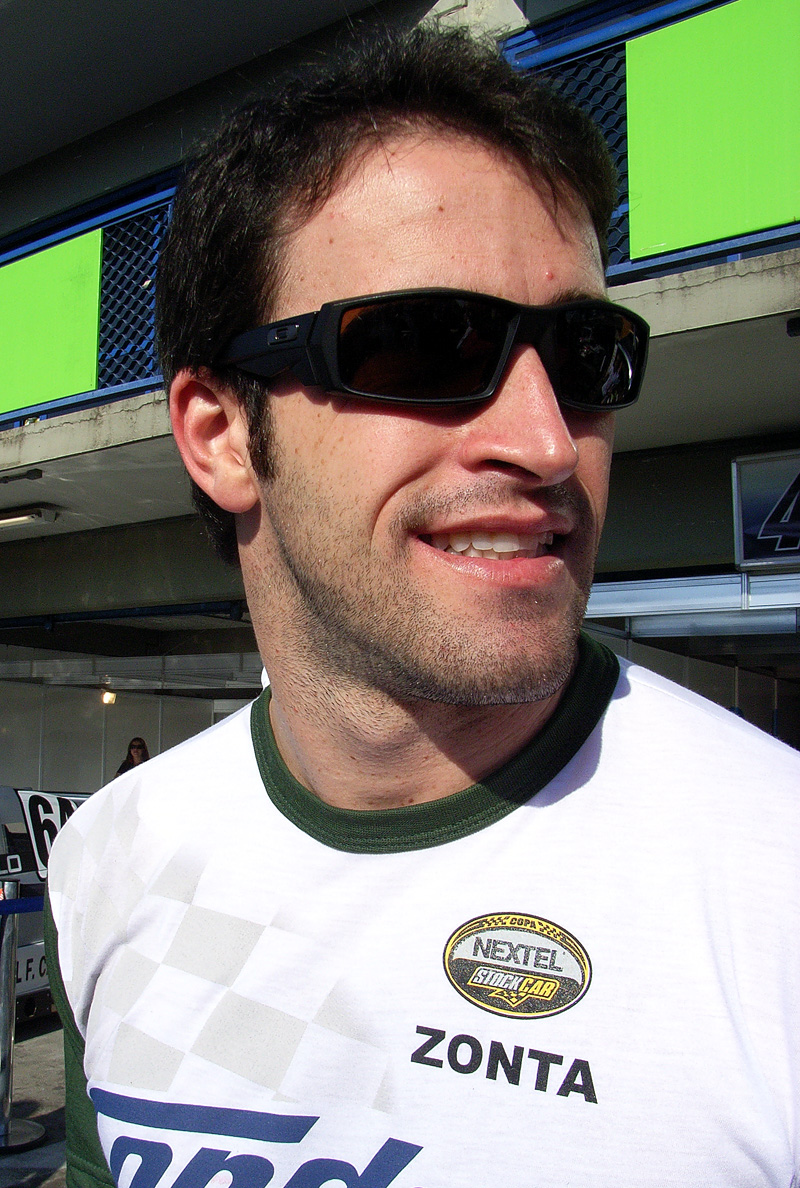
The Drivers' Championship was won by Brazilian Ricardo Zonta of Super Nova Racing, who won three races.

== Drivers and teams ==
The following teams and drivers contested the 1997 FIA Formula 3000 International Championship. The Lola T96/50 Zytek-Judd was used by all teams, as was mandatory under the championship regulations.

| Team | No. | Driver | Rounds |
|---|---|---|---|
| (Austria) RSM Marko | 1 | (Australia) Craig Lowndes | All |
| (Austria) RSM Marko | 2 | (Colombia) Juan Pablo Montoya | All |
| (United Kingdom) Super Nova Racing | 3 | (Brazil) Ricardo Zonta | All |
| (United Kingdom) Super Nova Racing | 4 | (France) Laurent Redon | All |
| (Belgium) Team Astromega | 5 | (France) Boris Derichebourg | All |
| (Belgium) Team Astromega | 6 | (France) Soheil Ayari | All |
| (Italy) Draco Engineering | 7 | (France) Cyrille Sauvage | All |
| (Italy) Draco Engineering | 8 | (Portugal) Pedro Couceiro | All |
| (France) Apomatox | 9 | (Italy) Fabrizio Gollin | 1-3, 9 |
| (France) Apomatox | 9 | (France) Emmanuel Clérico | 4 |
| (France) Apomatox | 10 | (France) Jean-Philippe Belloc | 1-4 |
| (United Kingdom) Edenbridge Racing | 11 | (South Africa) Werner Lupberger | All |
| (United Kingdom) Edenbridge Racing | 12 | (Brazil) Max Wilson | All |
| (United Kingdom) Pacific Racing | 14 | (Austria) Oliver Tichy | 1-8 |
| (United Kingdom) Pacific Racing | 15 | (Spain) Marc Gené | 1-2 |
| (France) DAMS | 16 | (France) Grégoire de Galzain | All |
| (France) DAMS | 17 | (United Kingdom) Jamie Davies | All |
| (Italy) Durango Formula | 18 | (South Africa) Stephen Watson | All |
| (Italy) Durango Formula | 19 | (United Kingdom) Gareth Rees | All |
| (Italy) Auto Sport Racing | 20 | (Argentina) Gastón Mazzacane | All |
| (Italy) Auto Sport Racing | 21 | (Denmark) Tom Kristensen | All |
| (United Kingdom) Nordic Racing | 22 | (Italy) Thomas Biagi | 1-3 |
| (United Kingdom) Nordic Racing | 22 | (Spain) Marc Gené | 4-6, 10 |
| (United Kingdom) Nordic Racing | 22 | (Austria) Mario Waltner | 7-8 |
| (United Kingdom) Nordic Racing | 22 | (Italy) Gianluca Paglicci | 9 |
| (United Kingdom) Nordic Racing | 23 | (Portugal) Rui Águas | All |
| (United Kingdom) Bob Salisbury Engineering | 24 | (United Kingdom) Oliver Gavin | 1-3 |
| (United Kingdom) Bob Salisbury Engineering | 24 | (United Kingdom) James Taylor | 4-10 |
| (United Kingdom) Bob Salisbury Engineering | 25 | (Norway) Thomas Schie | All |
| (Denmark) Den Blå Avis | 26 | (Denmark) Jason Watt | All |
| (United Kingdom) DC Cook Motorsport | 27 | (United Kingdom) David Cook | All |
| (United Kingdom) DC Cook Motorsport | 28 | (France) Patrick Lemarié | 9-10 |
| (Italy) Coloni Motorsport | 29 | (Austria) Markus Friesacher | All |
| (Italy) Coloni Motorsport | 30 | (Argentina) Emiliano Spataro | 1-9 |
| (Italy) Coloni Motorsport | 30 | (Austria) Oliver Tichy | 10 |
| (Italy) Ravarotto Racing | 31 | (France) Anthony Beltoise | 1-7 |
| (Italy) Ravarotto Racing | 32 | (France) Patrick Lemarié | 1-5, 7 |
| (Italy) GP Racing | 33 | (Italy) Thomas Biagi | 4-10 |
| (Spain) Elide Racing | 34 | (Spain) Miguel Ángel de Castro | 10 |
| (United Kingdom) Arden International | 35 | (United Kingdom) Christian Horner | All |
| (Belgium) KTR | 36 | (Belgium) Kurt Mollekens | All |
| (United Kingdom) Redman & Bright F3000 | 37 | (Uruguay) Gonzalo Rodríguez | 1, 3-7, 9-10 |
| (United Kingdom) DKS Racing | 38 | (United Kingdom) Dino Morelli | 1-4 |

== Calendar ==
| Round | Circuit | Date | Pole position | Fastest lap | Winning driver | Winning team | Report |
|---|---|---|---|---|---|---|---|
| 1 | (United Kingdom) Silverstone Circuit | 11 May | (Brazil) Ricardo Zonta | (Spain) Marc Gené | (Denmark) Tom Kristensen | (Italy) Auto Sport Racing | Report |
| 2 | (France) Pau Grand Prix | 19 May | (Colombia) Juan Pablo Montoya | (Colombia) Juan Pablo Montoya | (Colombia) Juan Pablo Montoya | (Austria) RSM Marko | Report |
| 3 | (Finland) Helsinki Thunder | 25 May | (Colombia) Juan Pablo Montoya | (Colombia) Juan Pablo Montoya | (France) Soheil Ayari | (Belgium) Team Astromega | Report |
| 4 | (Germany) Nürburgring | 29 June | (Brazil) Ricardo Zonta | (Brazil) Ricardo Zonta | (Brazil) Ricardo Zonta | (United Kingdom) Super Nova Racing | Report |
| 5 | (Italy) Autodromo di Pergusa | 20 July | (United Kingdom) Jamie Davies | (United Kingdom) Jamie Davies | (United Kingdom) Jamie Davies | (France) DAMS | Report |
| 6 | (Germany) Hockenheimring | 26 July | (Denmark) Tom Kristensen | (Colombia) Juan Pablo Montoya | (Brazil) Ricardo Zonta | (United Kingdom) Super Nova Racing | Report |
| 7 | (Austria) A1 Ring | 3 August | (Colombia) Juan Pablo Montoya | (Brazil) Ricardo Zonta | (Colombia) Juan Pablo Montoya | (Austria) RSM Marko | Report |
| 8 | (Belgium) Circuit de Spa-Francorchamps | 22 August | (Denmark) Tom Kristensen | (Portugal) Rui Águas | (Denmark) Jason Watt | (Denmark) Den Blå Avis | Report |
| 9 | (Italy) Mugello Circuit | 29 September | (Brazil) Ricardo Zonta | (Brazil) Ricardo Zonta | (Brazil) Ricardo Zonta | (United Kingdom) Super Nova Racing | Report |
| 10 | (Spain) Circuito de Jerez | 25 October | (Brazil) Ricardo Zonta | (Brazil) Ricardo Zonta | (Colombia) Juan Pablo Montoya | (Austria) RSM Marko | Report |

== Season summary ==
After finishing the season with two wins in the last three races of 1996, Brazil's Ricardo Zonta entered 1997 as the pre-season title favourite with the Super Nova team. However, he endured a frustrating start with no points from the first three races. The early pace in the championship battle was set by Denmark's Tom Kristensen, who inherited the race victory at a damp Silverstone from the disqualified Zonta, and then finished behind Juan Pablo Montoya on the street circuit at Pau. After an attritional race in Helsinki won by Soheil Ayari, where most of the major title contenders failed to finish and just nine drivers made it to the chequered flag, the field endured another wet race at the Nurburgring. It was marred by a serious accident involving British drivers Dino Morelli and Gareth Rees, in which Morelli suffered severe leg injuries which would keep him out of racing for the rest of the season. With the race abandoned after just four laps, Zonta was declared the winner, but with only half-points awarded.

By mid-season, the competitive start to the season left the championship battle wide open, with Kristensen and Enna winner Jamie Davies leading the standings halfway through the season ahead of Montoya, Zonta and Ayari. Zonta became the first driver to win twice with a dominant drive at Hockenheim, but left Germany a point behind the consistent Davies, who had been on the podium in four of the six races so far. However, at the A1-Ring, a disastrous qualifying left the British driver down in 24th place on the grid, leaving him out of contention for points. Montoya led home Zonta, who became the new championship leader.

The race at Spa-Francorchamps was another overshadowed by a large crash, as Kristensen crashed heavily while leading at the high-speed Blanchimont corner, triggering a pile-up, though no drivers were seriously injured. Denmark's Jason Watt took his first Formula 3000 race win to enter title contention, as Zonta could only manage to finish fifth, and his rivals all failed to score points. However, a month later, a controversial round at Mugello settled the championship - Kristensen was excluded from the event for running an illegal spacer, while Davies and DAMS team mate Gregoire de Galzain were also excluded for failure to attend the drivers' briefing. Zonta's race win, with Montoya only finishing third behind Watt, meant that the Brazilian was declared champion. The Auto Sport and Durango teams protested Zonta and Watt's results for allegedly having used illegal fuel and car parts, but this protest was quashed and the results stood. Montoya went on to win the final round at Jerez, securing second place in the championship. Watt finished third ahead of Davies, who had failed to score any points since taking the lead of the championship with four races to go.

None of the drivers who participated in the 1997 season were able to take seats on the 1998 Formula One grid. Zonta moved to the AMG Mercedes team in the FIA GT Championship, which he won jointly with Klaus Ludwig, and went on to drive for BAR in Formula One in 1999. Kristensen, who had won the 1997 24 Hours of Le Mans, moved into sportscar racing, while the remaining major contenders would return to Formula 3000 in 1998. Having won the 1996 Australian Touring Car Championship on debut, Craig Lowndes returned to Australia the following year and won a second ATCC title in as many attempts.

== Drivers' Championship ==
| Pos | Driver | SIL (United Kingdom) | PAU (France) | HEL (Finland) | NÜR (Germany) | PER (Italy) | HOC (Germany) | A1R (Austria) | SPA (Belgium) | MUG (Italy) | JER (Spain) | Points |
|---|---|---|---|---|---|---|---|---|---|---|---|---|
| 1 | (Brazil) Ricardo Zonta | **DSQ** | Ret | Ret | **1** | 2 | 1 | 2 | 5 | **1** | **Ret** | 39 |
| 2 | (Colombia) Juan Pablo Montoya | Ret | **1** | **Ret** | 4 | 11 | 5 | **1** | DSQ | 3 | 1 | 37.5 |
| 3 | (Denmark) Jason Watt | 4 | 12 | DNS | 2 | Ret | 4 | Ret | 1 | 2 | Ret | 25 |
| 4 | (United Kingdom) Jamie Davies | 3 | 3 | Ret | 8 | **1** | 3 | 9 | 8 | EX | Ret | 22 |
| 5 | (Brazil) Max Wilson | Ret | 7 | Ret | 5 | 3 | 2 | 8 | 2 | 4 | 10 | 21 |
| 6 | (Denmark) Tom Kristensen | 1 | 2 | Ret | 3 | Ret | **Ret** | 6 | **Ret** | EX | Ret | 19 |
| 7 | (Austria) Oliver Tichy | 8 | 8 | 2 | 9 | Ret | 7 | 5 | Ret | | 2 | 14 |
| 8 | (France) Soheil Ayari | Ret | 6 | 1 | 19 | Ret | Ret | 10 | Ret | 6 | Ret | 12 |
| 9 | (France) Laurent Redon | Ret | 4 | Ret | 21 | 6 | Ret | 3 | 14 | 5 | 11 | 10 |
| 10 | (Portugal) Rui Águas | Ret | 9 | 5 | 7 | Ret | DSQ | 4 | 9 | 12 | 5 | 7 |
| 11 | (Portugal) Pedro Couceiro | 2 | Ret | Ret | 15 | DNS | Ret | 11 | 7 | Ret | Ret | 6 |
| 12 | (United Kingdom) Dino Morelli | 5 | 11 | 3 | Ret | | | | | | | 6 |
| 13 | (France) Cyrille Sauvage | 7 | 5 | Ret | Ret | 8 | Ret | Ret | 4 | 9 | DSQ | 5 |
| 14 | (United Kingdom) Gareth Rees | Ret | Ret | Ret | Ret | 16 | 11 | Ret | Ret | 7 | 3 | 4 |
| 15 | (France) Boris Derichebourg | 12 | 15 | 8 | Ret | 9 | DNQ | 13 | 3 | 22 | 15 | 4 |
| 16 | (France) Patrick Lemarié | 6 | 13 | 4 | 13 | | Ret | | | 14 | DNQ | 4 |
| 17 | (Australia) Craig Lowndes | 14 | Ret | Ret | Ret | 4 | Ret | Ret | Ret | 21 | 9 | 3 |
| 18 | (South Africa) Werner Lupberger | 11 | DNQ | DNQ | 18 | Ret | 14 | Ret | 13 | 11 | 4 | 3 |
| 19 | (Belgium) Kurt Mollekens | EX | 10 | Ret | DNQ | 5 | 6 | Ret | Ret | Ret | Ret | 3 |
| 20 | (South Africa) Stephen Watson | 15 | DNQ | 6 | 16 | 7 | 12 | Ret | 6 | 15 | Ret | 2 |
| 21 | (United Kingdom) Christian Horner | 16 | DNQ | DNQ | DNQ | DNQ | DNQ | 16 | DNQ | 17 | 6 | 1 |
| 22 | (Uruguay) Gonzalo Rodríguez | DNQ | | Ret | 6 | Ret | 17 | 7 | | 8 | Ret | 0.5 |
| 23 | (United Kingdom) David Cook | Ret | DNQ | 7 | DNQ | Ret | DNQ | 14 | Ret | Ret | 7 | 0 |
| 24 | (France) Grégoire de Galzain | DNQ | DNQ | DNQ | 17 | Ret | 9 | 15 | Ret | EX | 8 | 0 |
| 25 | (Spain) Marc Gené | 13 | DNQ | | DNQ | Ret | 8 | | | | Ret | 0 |
| 26 | (France) Anthony Beltoise | Ret | Ret | 9 | 14 | 12 | 13 | Ret | | | | 0 |
| 27 | (France) Jean-Philippe Belloc | 9 | Ret | Ret | 20 | | | | | | | 0 |
| 28 | (Argentina) Gastón Mazzacane | 10 | DNQ | Ret | 10 | 15 | 10 | 17 | 11 | 10 | Ret | 0 |
| 29 | (Norway) Thomas Schie | DNQ | 14 | DNQ | DNQ | DNQ | 15 | DNQ | 10 | 18 | Ret | 0 |
| 30 | (Argentina) Emiliano Spataro | DNQ | DNQ | DNQ | 11 | 13 | 16 | 12 | Ret | Ret | | 0 |
| 31 | (Italy) Thomas Biagi | DNQ | DNQ | DNQ | DNQ | 14 | 18 | Ret | Ret | 16 | 12 | 0 |
| 32 | (France) Emmanuel Clérico | | | | 12 | | | | | | | 0 |
| 33 | (United Kingdom) James Taylor | | | | DNQ | DNQ | DNQ | DNQ | 12 | DNQ | DNQ | 0 |
| 34 | (Italy) Fabrizio Gollin | Ret | Ret | Ret | | | | | | 13 | | 0 |
| 35 | (Austria) Markus Friesacher | DNQ | DNQ | DNQ | DNQ | 17 | DNQ | DNQ | Ret | 19 | DNQ | 0 |
| 36 | (Italy) Gianluca Paglicci | | | | | | | | | 20 | | 0 |
| – | (Spain) Miguel Ángel de Castro | | | | | | | | | | DNQ | 0 |
| – | (Austria) Mario Waltner | | | | | | | DNQ | DNQ | | | 0 |
| – | (United Kingdom) Oliver Gavin | DNQ | DNQ | DNQ | | | | | | | | 0 |
| Pos | Driver | SIL (United Kingdom) | PAU (France) | HEL (Finland) | NÜR (Germany) | PER (Italy) | HOC (Germany) | A1R (Austria) | SPA (Belgium) | MUG (Italy) | JER (Spain) | Points |

| Colour | Result |
|---|---|
| Gold | Winner |
| Silver | Second place |
| Bronze | Third place |
| Green | Points classification |
| Blue | Non-points classification |
| Blue | Non-classified finish (NC) |
| Purple | Retired, not classified (Ret) |
| Red | Did not qualify (DNQ) |
| Red | Did not pre-qualify (DNPQ) |
| Black | Disqualified (DSQ) |
| White | Did not start (DNS) |
| White | Withdrew (WD) |
| White | Race cancelled (C) |
| Blank | Did not practice (DNP) |
| Blank | Did not arrive (DNA) |
| Blank | Excluded (EX) |

**Bold** – Pole
Italics – Fastest lap

=== Notes ===
- All drivers used Lola T96/50 chassis, with Zytek-Judd engines, and Avon tyres.
- Ricardo Zonta was disqualified from first place at Silverstone due to a gearbox irregularity.
- Nurburgring race was stopped prematurely due to an accident involving Dino Morelli in torrential rain. Half points awarded.
- Juan Pablo Montoya was disqualified during the Spa-Francorchamps race for holding up the field with a damaged car.
- Jamie Davies and Grégoire de Galzain were excluded from the race at Mugello for failing to attend the drivers' briefing. Tom Kristensen was excluded from the same event due to having an illegal spacer fitted.
- Rui Águas was disqualified during the race at Hockenheim for dangerous driving.
- Cyrille Sauvage was disqualified from second place at Jerez because a member of his team entered parc fermé after the race.
- Kurt Mollekens was excluded from the race at Silverstone after failing to attend the drivers' briefing.

== Complete overview ==
| first column of every race | 10 | = grid position |

| second column of every race | 10 | = race result |

R24=retired, but classified R=retired NS=did not start NQ=did not qualify NT=no time set in qualifying DIS(1)=disqualified after finishing as winner (13)=place after practice, but grid position not held free DIS=disqualified in practice

| Place | Name | Team | SIL (United Kingdom) | | PAU (France) | | HEL (Finland) | | NÜR (Germany) | | PER (Italy) | | HOC (Germany) | | OST (Austria) | | SPA (Belgium) | | MUG (Italy) | | JER (Spain) |
| 1 | (Brazil) Ricardo Zonta | SuperNova Racing | 1 | DIS(1) | 8 | R | 8 | R | 1 | 1 | 2 | 2 | 2 | 1 | 2 | 2 | 5 | 5 | 1 | 1 | 1 | R |
| 2 | (Colombia) Juan Pablo Montoya | RSM Marko | 2 | R | 1 | 1 | 1 | R | 4 | 4 | 6 | 11 | 15 | 5 | 1 | 1 | 4 | R | 2 | 3 | 4 | 1 |
| 3 | (Denmark) Jason Watt | Den Blå Avis | 3 | 4 | 15 | 12 | (13) | NS | 3 | 2 | 8 | R | 5 | 4 | 9 | R | 2 | 1 | 4 | 2 | 6 | R |
| 4 | (United Kingdom) Jamie Davies | DAMS | 23 | 3 | 4 | 3 | 2 | R | 13 | 8 | 1 | 1 | 6 | 3 | 24 | 9 | 15 | 8 | DIS | - | 3 | R |
| 5 | (Brazil) Max Wilson | Edenbridge Racing | 8 | R | 11 | 7 | 21 | R | 5 | 5 | 4 | 3 | 3 | 2 | 14 | 8 | 8 | 2 | 3 | 4 | 9 | 10 |
| 6 | (Denmark) Tom Kristensen | Auto Sport Racing | 12 | 1 | 2 | 2 | 6 | R | 2 | 3 | 10 | R | 1 | R | 3 | 6 | 1 | R | DIS | - | 2 | R |
| 7 | (Austria) Oliver Tichy | Pacific Racing | 7 | 8 | 9 | 8 | 3 | 2 | 17 | 9 | 9 | R | 17 | 7 | 16 | 5 | 21 | R | - | - |
| 7 | (Austria) Oliver Tichy | Coloni Motorsport | | | | | | | | | | | | | | | | | | | 7 | 2 |
| 8 | (France) Soheil Ayari | Team Astromega | 4 | R | 5 | 6 | 9 | 1 | 8 | 19 | 13 | R | 8 | R | 6 | 10 | 3 | R | 7 | 6 | 8 | R |
| 9 | (France) Laurent Rédon | SuperNova Racing | 10 | R | 3 | 4 | 11 | R | 7 | 21 | 11 | 6 | 9 | R | 5 | 3 | 9 | 14 | 6 | 5 | 16 | 11 |
| 10 | (Portugal) Rui Águas | Nordic Racing | 5 | R | 12 | 9 | 18 | 5 | 12 | 7 | 7 | R | 4 | R | 8 | 4 | 17 | 9 | 13 | 12 | 10 | 5 |
| 11 | (Portugal) Pedro Couceiro | Draco Engineering | 22 | 2 | 7 | R | 19 | R | 14 | 15 | (12) | NS | 24 | R | 13 | 11 | 16 | 7 | 17 | R | 19 | R |
| | (United Kingdom) Dino Morelli | DKS Racing | 11 | 5 | 19 | 11 | 7 | 3 | 16 | R24 | - | - | - | - | - | - | - | - | - | - | - | - |
| 13 | (France) Cyrille Sauvage | Draco Engineering | 13 | 7 | 6 | 5 | 4 | R | 15 | R23 | 3 | 8 | 13 | R | 7 | R | 24 | 4 | 9 | 9 | 5 | DIS(2) |
| 14 | (France) Patrick Lemarié | Ravarotto Racing | 25 | 6 | 17 | 13 | 13 | 4 | 11 | 13 | - | - | 16 | R | - | - | - | - |
| 14 | (France) Patrick Lemarié | D C Cook Motorsport | | | | | | | | | | | | | | | | | 19 | 14 | 27 | NQ |
| | (France) Boris Derichebourg | Team Astromega | 20 | 12 | 21 | 15 | 22 | 8 | 6 | R | 16 | 9 | 27 | NQ | 22 | 13 | 6 | 3 | 11 | 22 | 15 | R |
| | (United Kingdom) Gareth Rees | Durango Formula | 15 | R | 16 | R | 12 | R | 9 | R22 | 20 | 16 | 19 | 11 | 18 | R | 11 | R | 5 | 7 | 11 | 3 |
| 17 | (Australia) Craig Lowndes | RSM Marko | 6 | 14 | 14 | R | 20 | R | 23 | R25 | 15 | 4 | 10 | R | 10 | R | 20 | R | 10 | 21 | 13 | 9 |
| | (Belgium) Kurt Mollekens | KTR | DIS | - | 13 | 10 | 5 | R | 32 | NQ | 12 | 5 | 26 | 6 | 12 | R | 18 | R | 24 | R | 21 | R |
| | (South Africa) Werner Lupberger | Edenbridge Racing | 26 | 11 | 28 | NQ | 30 | NQ | 19 | 18 | 21 | R | 23 | 14 | 15 | R | 10 | 13 | 14 | 11 | 14 | 4 |
| 20 | (South Africa) Stephen Watson | Durango Formula | 21 | 15 | 25 | NQ | 15 | 6 | 18 | 16 | 19 | 7 | 18 | 12 | 21 | R | 7 | 6 | 18 | 15 | 22 | R |
| 21 | (United Kingdom) Christian Horner | Arden International | 24 | R16 | 33 | NQ | 29 | NQ | 33 | NQ | 30 | NQ | 29 | NQ | 25 | 16 | 27 | NQ | 22 | 17 | 24 | 6 |
| 22 | (Uruguay) Gonzalo Rodríguez | Redman & Bright F3000 | 31 | NQ | - | - | 14 | R | 10 | 6 | 5 | R | 7 | 17 | 4 | 7 | - | - | 8 | 8 | 12 | R |
| - | (United Kingdom) David Cook | D C Cook Motorsport | 14 | R | 31 | NQ | 24 | 7 | 30 | NQ | 26 | R | 30 | NQ | 26 | 14 | 22 | R | 16 | R | 26 | 7 |
| - | (France) Grégoire de Galzain | DAMS | 29 | NQ | 32 | NQ | 32 | NQ | 26 | 17 | 23 | R | 20 | 9 | 23 | 15 | 23 | R | DIS | - | 17 | 8 |
| - | (Spain) Marc Gené | Pacific Racing | 16 | 13 | 23 | NQ | - | - |
| - | (Spain) Marc Gené | Nordic Racing | | | | | | | 31 | NQ | 12 | R10 | 11 | 8 | - | - | - | - | - | - | 20 | R |
| - | (France) Anthony Beltoise | Ravarotto Racing | 17 | R | 18 | R | 16 | 9 | 22 | 14 | 22 | 12 | 21 | 13 | 17 | R | - | - | - | - | - | - |
| - | (France) Jean-Philippe Belloc | Apomatox | 19 | 9 | 22 | R | 17 | R | 24 | 20 | - | - | - | - | - | - | - | - | - | - | - | - |
| - | (Argentina) Gastón Mazzacane | Auto Sport Racing | 9 | 10 | 24 | NQ | 23 | R | 20 | 10 | 17 | 15 | 12 | 10 | 11 | 17 | 19 | 11 | 12 | 10 | 18 | R |
| - | (Norway) Thomas Schie | BSE Salisbury Engineering | 32 | NQ | 20 | 14 | 26 | NQ | 28 | NQ | 28 | NQ | 22 | 15 | 27 | NQ | 13 | 10 | 23 | 18 | 25 | R |
| - | (Argentina) Emiliano Spataro | Coloni Motorsport | 32 | NQ | 29 | NQ | 27 | NQ | 21 | 11 | 24 | 13 | 25 | 16 | 23 | 15 | 20 | 12 | 15 | R | - | - |
| - | (Italy) Thomas Biagi | Nordic Racing | 28 | NQ | 26 | NQ | 31 | NQ |
| - | (Italy) Thomas Biagi | GP Racing | | | | | | | 27 | NQ | 18 | 14 | 14 | 18 | 19 | R | 25 | R | 20 | 16 | 23 | 12 |
| - | (France) Emmanuel Clérico | Apomatox | - | - | - | - | - | - | 25 | 12 | - | - | - | - | - | - | - | - | - | - | - | - |
| - | (United Kingdom) James Taylor | BSE Salisbury Engineering | - | - | - | - | - | - | 34 | NQ | 29 | NQ | 31 | NQ | NT | - | 26 | 12 | 27 | NQ | 30 | NQ |
| - | (Italy) Fabrizio Gollin | Apomatox | 18 | R | 10 | R | 10 | R | - | - | - | - | - | - | - | - | - | - | 21 | 13 | - | - |
| - | (Austria) Markus Friesacher | Coloni Motorsport | 27 | NQ | 30 | NQ | 28 | NQ | 29 | NQ | 25 | 17 | 28 | NQ | 28 | NQ | 14 | R | 26 | 19 | 28 | NQ |
| - | (Italy) Gianluca Paglicci | Nordic Racing | - | - | - | - | - | - | - | - | - | - | - | - | - | - | - | - | 25 | 20 | - | - |
| - | (United Kingdom) Oliver Gavin | BSE Salisbury Engineering | 30 | NQ | 27 | NQ | 33 | NQ | - | - | - | - | - | - | - | - | - | - | - | - | - | - |
| - | (Austria) Mario Waltner | Nordic Racing | - | - | - | - | - | - | - | - | - | - | - | - | 29 | NQ | 28 | NQ | - | - | - | - |
| - | (Spain) Miguel Ángel de Castro | Elide Racing | - | - | - | - | - | - | - | - | - | - | - | - | - | - | - | - | - | - | 29 | NQ |
