= Gonzalo Rodríguez (racing driver) =

Uruguayan racing driver (1971–1999)

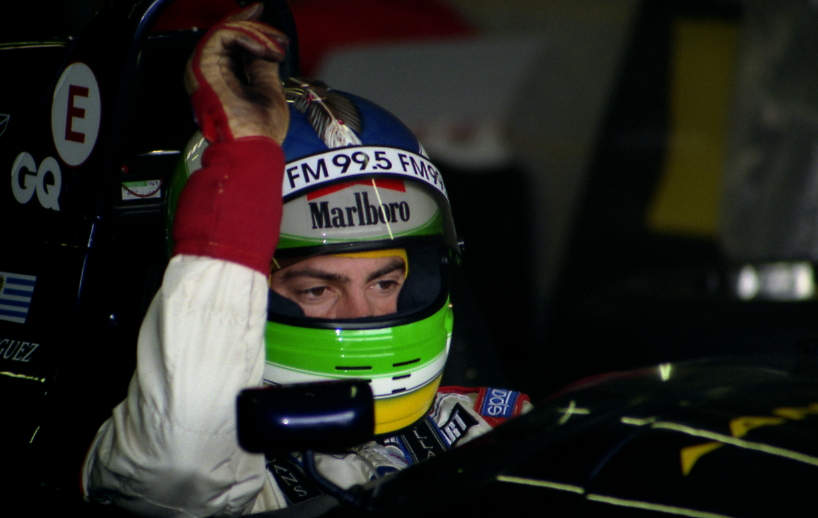
- Rodriguez in 1997
- Born: Gonzalo Rodríguez Bongoll; January 22, 1971 Montevideo, Uruguay
- Died: September 11, 1999 (aged 28) Laguna Seca Raceway, California, United States

CART Championship Car
- Years active: 1999
- Teams: Penske Racing
- Starts: 1
- Wins: 0
- Poles: 0

Previous series
- 1997–1999 1996–1997 1994–1996 1993: International Formula 3000; British Formula 3000; British Formula Renault; Spanish Formula Renault

Gonzalo "Gonchi" Rodríguez Bongoll (January 22, 1971 – September 11, 1999) was a Uruguayan racing driver. He won races at the International Formula 3000 and South American Super Touring Car Championship. He was killed in a crash at Laguna Seca Raceway during practice for the 1999 Honda Grand Prix of Monterey CART race, which would have been his second start in the series.

== Career ==
As a teenager, Rodríguez won multiple karting and junior formula championships in his homeland. In 1992 he move to Spain to compete at Formula Ford. He stepped up to Spanish Formula Renault in 1993, then switched to British Formula Renault in 1994.

Alan Docking signed Rodríguez for the 1995 British Formula Three. He placed 12th points with a best result of third at Donington 1, while he won at Silverstone 3 but was disqualified as a visor tearoff hit the engine's air intake during the race and generated a crack. He also finished 12th at the Macau Grand Prix. The following year, Rodríguez entered four rounds of the British F3 with Alan Docking. Then he did six rounds at British Formula Two with Edenbridge, claiming four podiums in six appearances.

In 1997, the Uruguayan competed at International Formula 3000 with Redman & Bright, scoring a sixth place at Nürburgring. Astromega signed him for 1998, with whom he claimed two wins at Spa-Francorchamps and Nürburgring and two additional podiums, finished third in the drivers championship. The following season, Rodríguez won at Monaco and finished second at Barcelona and Spa-Francorchamps, which earned him another third place in points despite missing the final round.

Also in 1999, he won the Punta del Este round of the South American Super Touring Car Championship in a BMW 3 Series. Later, as CART's Team Penske rotated between teammates to Al Unser Jr, the Uruguayan was given his opportunity at the Detroit Grand Prix, where he finished 12th and scoring a point.

== Death ==
Penske re-hired Rodríguez for the 1999 CART race at Laguna Seca Raceway. During the Saturday morning practice session, the driver was fatally injured in a crash at the Corkscrew corner. A stuck throttle was initially thought to be the cause for his car overshooting the braking point, leaving the track, striking a tire barrier and slamming into a concrete wall behind the barrier at the entry of the corner. Review of the in-car telemetry refuted this supposition. The impact caused his car to flip over the barrier and land upside down on the other side of the wall. Rodríguez was killed instantly by a basilar skull fracture caused by the impact with the wall, which was lined by only a thin layer of tires. Because of the incident, an additional tire wall was installed at the end of the straight. At the time of Rodríguez's death, he was 28 years old.

In 2021, teammate Al Unser, Jr. released his biography Al Unser, Jr.: A Checkered Past, written by motorsport author Jade Gurss. Unser noted the nuances of the incident, basing information on what happened to him during various testing and practice sessions during the season. Both he and Rodríguez were driving the Lola B99/00 chassis and not the Penske PC-27 chassis for the weekend, and he specifically noted a mechanical nuance with the Hewland gearbox in the Lola versus the Xtrac used by the Penske and Reynard chassis.

"The Lola would jam into neutral if you tried to downshift too fast. It did it to me a couple of times in testing, which is why I preferred the Penske. Going up the hill (before the Corkscrew), there is a point before you get to the top where you need to get out (of the throttle) to downshift and get the thing stopped. I think he was taking it to the top of the hill like (drivers driving Reynard 99I chassis vehicles that season). There was a limit on how fast you could downshift the Lola.

Unser believed the Hewland gearbox downshifted to neutral in the crash while Rodríguez was making a shift.

Rodríguez had a contract in place to compete in the 2000 CART championship with Patrick Racing, and there were rumours that Minardi could hire him for the 2001 Formula One season.

== Legacy ==
The Gonzalo Rodríguez Foundation was created in 2000, led by his sister María Fernanda "Nani" Rodríguez. It campaigned for the 2007 law to establish physical education in all public schools, and the 2012 law to require child safety seats. It also co-founded Latin NCAP, an independent car safety testing for Latin America.

A Spanish-language documentary of Rodríguez's life, Gonchi: la película, was released in 2015.

== Racing record ==
=== Complete International Formula 3000 results ===
(key) (Races in bold indicate pole position) (Races in italics indicate fastest lap)

Year	Entrant	1	2	3	4	5	6	7	8	9	10	11	12	DC	Points
1997	Redman & Bright F3000	SIL; DNQ	PAU	HEL; Ret	NÜR; 6	PER; Ret	HOC; 17	A1R; 7	SPA	MUG; 8	JER; Ret			22nd	0.5
1998	Team Astromega	OSC; Ret	IMO; 3	CAT; 21	SIL; Ret	MON; 2	PAU; Ret	A1R; 4	HOC; 11	HUN; 7	SPA; 1	PER; Ret	NÜR; 1	**3rd**	**33**
1999	Team Astromega	IMO; 5	MON; 1	CAT; 2	MAG; Ret	SIL; 15	A1R; DNQ	HOC; 4	HUN; Ret	SPA; 2	NÜR			**3rd**	**27**

=== Complete American Open Wheel results ===
(key)

==== CART ====
Year	Team	No.	Chassis	Engine	1	2	3	4	5	6	7	8	9	10	11	12	13	14	15	16	17	18	19	20	Rank	Points	Ref
1999	Team Penske	3	Lola B99/00	Mercedes-Benz IC108E	MIA	MOT	LBH	NZR	RIO	STL	MIL	POR	CLE	ROA	TOR	MIS	DET; 12	MDO	CHI	VAN	LAG; WD	HOU	SRF	FON	32nd	1	

== Gallery ==
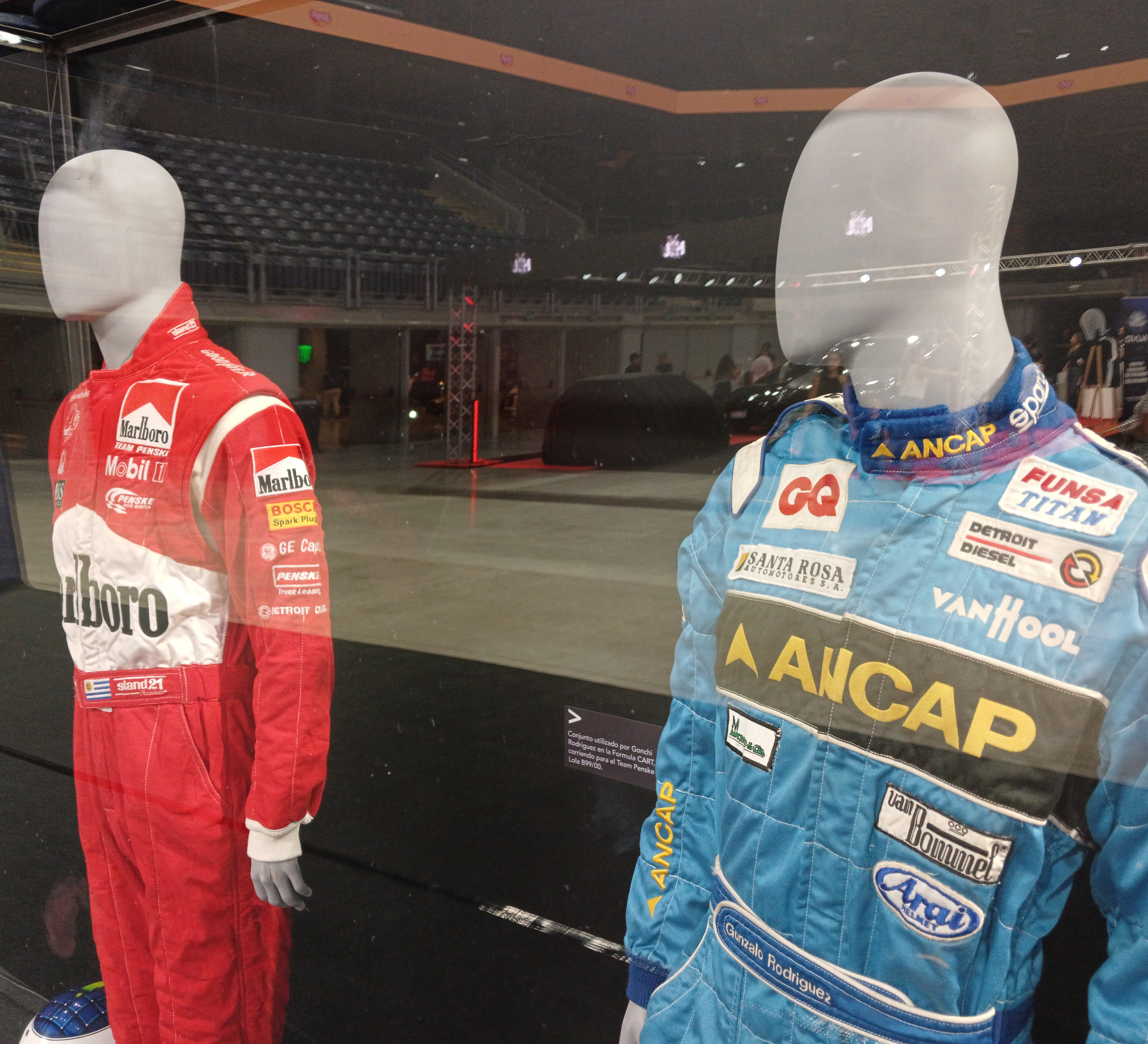
1999 Penske and Astromega firesuits

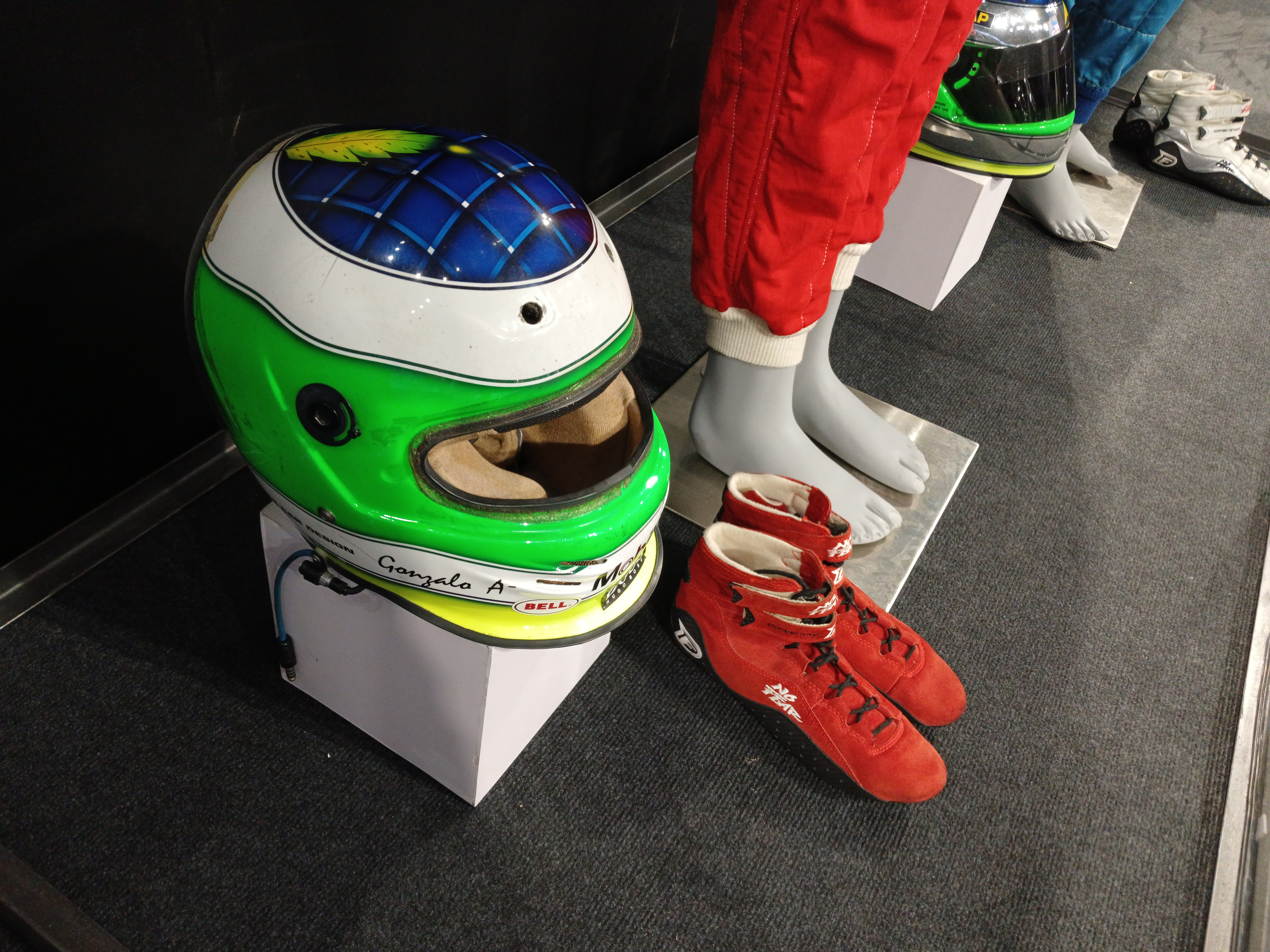
1999 Penske helmet

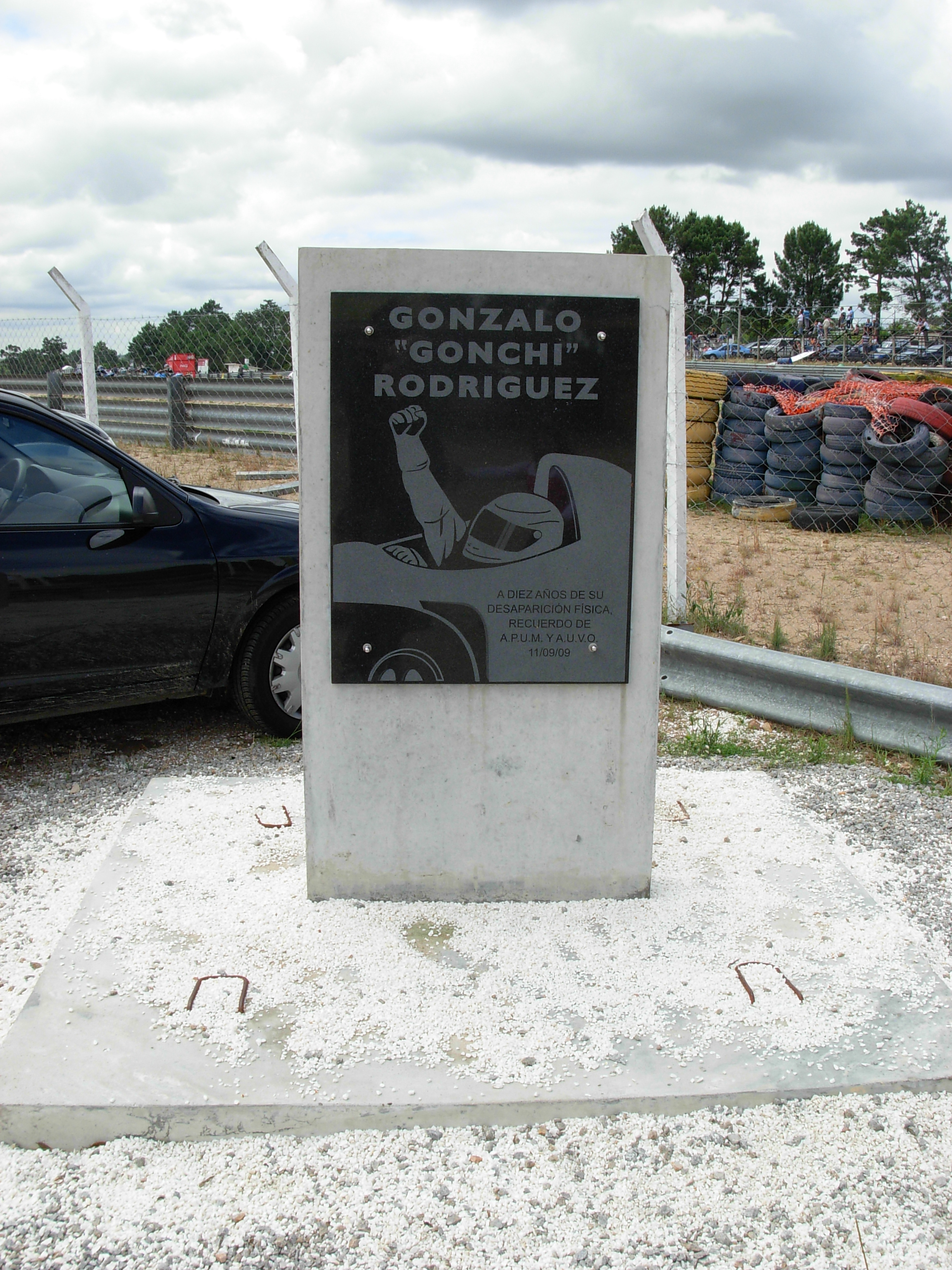
Monument at the Autódromo Víctor Borrat Fabini

Preceded by Unknown driver	Fatalities in CART/IndyCar; 1999	Succeeded by Greg Moore
