= Nordic Racing =

(United Kingdom) Nordic Racing
- Founded: 1993
- Base: Thetford, UK
- Team principal(s): Derek Mower
- Former series: Formula 3000
- Teams' Championships: F3000: 2001
- Drivers' Championships: Formula 3000: 2001: Justin Wilson

Coca-Cola Nordic Racing (formerly Nordic Racing 1993-2000) was an auto racing team from United Kingdom. Nordic Racing was owned by Derek Mower. It was headquartered in Thetford, UK. The team achieved its best results came in 2001 International Formula 3000 season when new sponsorship with Coca-Cola and strong line-up of Tomáš Enge and Justin Wilson brought titles in both teams championship and drivers championship of Wilson. The team last competed in 2002.

== Complete Formula 3000 results ==
(key) (Races in bold indicate pole position; races in italics indicate fastest lap)

Year	Chassis	Engine	Tyres	Driver	1	2	3	4	5	6	7	8	9	10	11	12	DC	Points	TC	Points
1993	Reynard 93D	Ford Cosworth	A		DON	SIL	PAU	PER	HOC	NÜR	SPA	MAG	NOG							
1993	Reynard 93D	Ford Cosworth	A	(Italy) Alessandro Zampedri	Ret	DSQ	DNQ	Ret	Ret	3	Ret	Ret	10				11th	4		
1994	Lola T94/50	Ford Cosworth	A		SIL	PAU	CAT	PER	HOC	SPA	EST	MAG								
1994	Lola T94/50	Ford Cosworth	A	(Belgium) Marc Goossens	Ret	Ret	6	7	5	Ret	Ret	Ret					9th	6		
1994	Lola T94/50	Ford Cosworth	A	(Spain) Jordi Gené	9	9	4										12th	3		
1994	Lola T94/50	Ford Cosworth	A	(United Kingdom) Oliver Gavin					DNS								-	0		
1994	Lola T94/50	Ford Cosworth	A	(Brazil) Paulo Carcasci							Ret						-	0		
1995	Lola T95/50	Ford Cosworth	A		SIL	CAT	PAU	PER	HOC	SPA	EST	MAG								
1995	Lola T95/50	Ford Cosworth	A	(South Africa) Stephen Watson	Ret	11	12	7	Ret	12	Ret	12					-	0		
1995	Lola T95/50	Ford Cosworth	A	(Belgium) Marc Goossens	4	5	3	Ret	1	Ret	8	2					**3rd**	**24**		
1996	Lola T96/50	Zytek	A		NÜR	PAU	PER	HOC	SIL	SPA	MAG	EST	MUG	HOC						
1996	Lola T96/50	Zytek	A	(United States) Elton Julian	13	DNS	Ret	Ret	7	14	12	18	14	5			14th	2		
1996	Lola T96/50	Zytek	A	(Japan) Akira Iida	14	8	11	12	13	Ret	14	12	18	9			-	0		
1997	Lola T96/50	Zytek-Judd	A		SIL	PAU	HEL	NÜR	PER	HOC	A1R	SPA	MUG	JER						
1997	Lola T96/50	Zytek-Judd	A	(Italy) Thomas Biagi	DNQ	DNQ	DNQ										-	0		
1997	Lola T96/50	Zytek-Judd	A	(Spain) Marc Gené				DNQ	Ret	8				Ret			0	-		
1997	Lola T96/50	Zytek-Judd	A	(Austria) Mario Waltner							DNQ	DNQ					0	-		
1997	Lola T96/50	Zytek-Judd	A	(Italy) Gianluca Paglicci									20				0	-		
1997	Lola T96/50	Zytek-Judd	A	(Portugal) Rui Águas	Ret	9	5	7	Ret	DSQ	4	9	12	5			10th	7		
1998	Lola T96/50	Zytek-Judd	A		OSC	IMO	CAT	SIL	MON	PAU	A1R	HOC	HUN	SPA	PER	NÜR				
1998	Lola T96/50	Zytek-Judd	A	(France) Fabrice Walfisch	13	18	20	25^{†}	DNQ	DNQ	Ret	Ret	Ret	22	Ret	8	-	0		
1998	Lola T96/50	Zytek-Judd	A	(Argentina) Brian Smith	10	Ret	Ret	15	11	8							-	0		
1998	Lola T96/50	Zytek-Judd	A	(United Kingdom) Kevin McGarrity							Ret	4	Ret				16th	3		
1998	Lola T96/50	Zytek-Judd	A	(Japan) Hidetoshi Mitsusada										23	Ret	15	-	0		
1999	Lola B99/50	Zytek	A		IMO	MON	CAT	MAG	SIL	A1R	HOC	HUN	SPA	NÜR					8th	6
1999	Lola B99/50	Zytek	A	(Germany) Sascha Bert	DNQ	DNQ	DNQ										-	0	8th	6
1999	Lola B99/50	Zytek	A	(Germany) Arnd Meier				DNQ	DNQ	DNQ	DNQ	DNQ	DNQ	DNQ			-	0	8th	6
1999	Lola B99/50	Zytek	A	(United Kingdom) Kevin McGarrity	2	DNQ	9	Ret	23	DNQ	15	10	Ret	7			10th	6	8th	6
2000	Lola B99/50	Zytek	A		IMO	SIL	CAT	NÜR	MON	MAG	A1R	HOC	HUN	SPA					6th	19
2000	Lola B99/50	Zytek	A	(United Kingdom) Kevin McGarrity	15	Ret	Ret	Ret	4	15	DNQ	11	Ret	DNQ			21st	3	6th	19
2000	Lola B99/50	Zytek	A	(United Kingdom) Justin Wilson	8	3	5	Ret	7	9	2	Ret	5	5			5th	16	6th	19
2001	Lola B99/50	Zytek	A		INT	IMO	CAT	A1R	MON	NÜR	MAG	SIL	HOC	HUN	SPA	MNZ			**1st**	**110**
2001	Lola B99/50	Zytek	A	(Czech Republic) Tomáš Enge	12	3	1	3	7	**1**	**3**	**5**	5	11	4		**3rd**	**39**	**1st**	**110**
2001	Lola B99/50	Zytek	A	(Czech Republic) Jaroslav Janiš												16	-	0	**1st**	**110**
2001	Lola B99/50	Zytek	A	(United Kingdom) Justin Wilson	1	6	**3**	1	2	Ret	2	2	2	**1**	2	2	**1st**	**71**	**1st**	**110**
2002	Lola B02/50	Zytek	A		INT	IMO	CAT	A1R	MON	NÜR	SIL	MAG	HOC	HUN	SPA	MNZ			9th	1
2002	Lola B02/50	Zytek	A	(Australia) Ryan Briscoe	12	13	12	17	Ret	Ret	12						-	0	9th	1
2002	Lola B02/50	Zytek	A	(Sweden) Thed Björk								Ret	7	13	8	7	-	0	9th	1
2002	Lola B02/50	Zytek	A	(Hungary) Zsolt Baumgartner	Ret	9	Ret	11	Ret	12	14	12	8	7	8	6	15th	1	9th	1
