= Keerbergs Transport Racing =

(Belgium) KTR
- Founded: 1978
- Founder(s): Prosper Mollekens
- Team principal(s): Kurt Mollekens
- Former series: International Formula 3000; Formula Renault 3.5 Series; Formula Renault Eurocup; Formula Renault Northern European Cup

Keerbergs Transport Racing (commonly referred to as KTR) is a Belgian motor racing team, founded by Prosper Mollekens in 1978. Since the mid-1990s it has been managed by Kurt Mollekens. During the 2000s, the Belgian team took part in the Formula Renault 3.5, Eurocup Formula Renault 2.0 and Formula Renault 2.0 NEC championships.

== Complete Formula 3000 results ==
(key) (Races in bold indicate pole position; races in italics indicate fastest lap)

Year	Chassis	Engine	Tyres	Driver	1	2	3	4	5	6	7	8	9	10	11	12	TC	Points
1997	Lola T96/50	Zytek	A		SIL	PAU	HEL	NÜR	PER	HOC	A1R	SPA	MUG	JER			15th	3
1997	Lola T96/50	Zytek	A	(Belgium) Kurt Mollekens	EX	10	Ret	DNQ	5	6	Ret	Ret	Ret	Ret			15th	3
1998	Lola T96/50	Zytek	A		OSC	IMO	CAT	SIL	MON	PAU	A1R	HOC	HUN	SPA	PER	NÜR	7th	19
1998	Lola T96/50	Zytek	A	(Belgium) Kurt Mollekens	Ret	2	2	8	5	5	10	Ret		DNQ	8	4	7th	19
1999	Lola B99/50	Zytek	A		IMO	MON	CAT	MAG	SIL	A1R	HOC	HUN	SPA	NÜR			12th	4
1999	Lola B99/50	Zytek	A	(Belgium) Bas Leinders	DNQ	DNQ	Ret	6	16	Ret	Ret	Ret	DNQ	Ret			12th	4
1999	Lola B99/50	Zytek	A	(Belgium) Jeffrey van Hooydonk	Ret	10	11	4	19	DNQ	DNQ	Ret	DNQ	12			12th	4
2000	Lola B99/50	Zytek	A		IMO	SIL	CAT	NÜR	MON	MAG	A1R	HOC	HUN	SPA			13th	3
2000	Lola B99/50	Zytek	A	(Belgium) Jeffrey van Hooydonk	13	9	4	Ret	9	19	**12**	Ret	Ret	Ret			13th	3
2000	Lola B99/50	Zytek	A	(Belgium) Yves Olivier	DNQ	20	16	7	DNQ	DNQ	13	16	DNQ	17			13th	3
2001	Lola B99/50	Zytek	A		INT	IMO	CAT	A1R	MON	NÜR	MAG	SIL	HOC	HUN	SPA	MNZ	6th	19
2001	Lola B99/50	Zytek	A	(Belgium) Bas Leinders	10	9	2	2	Ret	11	Ret	8	6	6	7	4	6th	19
2001	Lola B99/50	Zytek	A	(Switzerland) Joël Camathias	5	15	18	Ret	Ret	18	17	17	9	13	15	15	6th	19
