= RSM Marko =

Austrian auto racing team (1990–2003)

(Austria) RSM Marko
- Founded: 1990
- Founder(s): Helmut Marko
- Folded: 2003
- Team principal(s): Helmut Marko
- Former series: Formula 3000
- Drivers' Championships: 1996 F3000 (Jörg Müller)

RSM Marko (known as Red Bull Junior Team from 1999 to 2003) was an Austrian auto racing team, which competed in the FIA Formula 3000 Championship and the 1998 Indy Racing League Dura Lube 200.

The team won the drivers' championship in 1996 with Jörg Müller.

== Complete Formula 3000 results ==
Year	Car	Drivers	Races	Wins	Poles	Fast laps	Points	D.C.	T.C.
1990	Lola T90/50-Ford Cosworth	(Austria) Karl Wendlinger	6	0	0	0	2	21st	13th
1990	Lola T90/50-Ford Cosworth	(Germany) Ellen Lohr	0	0	0	0	0	NC	13th
1991	Reynard 91D-Ford Cosworth	(Austria) Karl Wendlinger	5	0	0	0	6	12th	9th
1992 – 1995: "RSM Marko" did not compete.
1996	Lola T96/50-Zytek	(Austria) Oliver Tichy	9	0	0	0	5	10th	2nd
1996	Lola T96/50-Zytek	(Germany) Jörg Müller	10	2	2	4	52	1st	2nd
1997	Lola T96/50-Zytek	(Australia) Craig Lowndes	10	0	0	0	3	17th	2nd
1997	Lola T96/50-Zytek	(Colombia) Juan Pablo Montoya	10	3	3	3	37.5	2nd	2nd
1998: "RSM Marko" did not compete.
1999	Lola B99/50-Zytek	(Brazil) Enrique Bernoldi	10	0	0	0	2	18th	15th
1999	Lola B99/50-Zytek	(Austria) Markus Friesacher	3	0	0	0	0	NC	15th
1999	Lola B99/50-Zytek	(Brazil) Ricardo Maurício	7	0	0	0	1	22nd	15th
2000	Lola B99/50-Zytek	(Brazil) Ricardo Maurício	10	0	0	0	4	17th	9th
2000	Lola B99/50-Zytek	(Brazil) Enrique Bernoldi	10	0	0	0	5	16th	9th
2001	Lola B99/50-Zytek	(Austria) Patrick Friesacher	12	0	0	0	8	13th	5th
2001	Lola B99/50-Zytek	(Spain) Antonio García	4	0	0	0	0	NC	5th
2001	Lola B99/50-Zytek	(Brazil) Ricardo Maurício	8	0	0	0	14	8th	5th
2002	Lola B02/50-Zytek	(Austria) Patrick Friesacher	12	0	0	0	14	10th	5th
2002	Lola B02/50-Zytek	(Brazil) Ricardo Maurício	12	0	0	0	9	11th	5th
2003	Lola B02/50-Zytek	(Italy) Vitantonio Liuzzi	10	0	1	0	39	4th	2nd
2003	Lola B02/50-Zytek	(Austria) Patrick Friesacher	8	1	0	1	36	5th	2nd
2003	Lola B02/50-Zytek	(Austria) Bernhard Auinger	2	0	0	0	0	NC	2nd

=== In detail ===
(key) (Races in bold indicate pole position; races in italics indicate fastest lap)

Year	Chassis	Engine	Tyres	Driver	1	2	3	4	5	6	7	8	9	10	11	12	TC	Points
1990	Lola T90/50	Ford Cosworth	A		DON	SIL	PAU	JER	MNZ	PER	HOC	BRH	BIR	BUG	NOG		13th	2
1990	Lola T90/50	Ford Cosworth	A	(Austria) Karl Wendlinger	DNQ	14		DNQ	Ret	Ret	5	DNQ	10		9		13th	2
1990	Lola T90/50	Ford Cosworth	A	(Germany) Ellen Lohr										DNQ			13th	2
1991	Reynard 91D	Ford Cosworth	A		VAL	PAU	JER	MUG	PER	HOC	BRH	SPA	BUG	NOG			9th	6
1991	Reynard 91D	Ford Cosworth	A	(Austria) Karl Wendlinger			5		Ret	3		Ret	Ret				9th	6
1992 – 1995: "RSM Marko" did not compete.
1996	Lola T96/50	Zytek	A		NÜR	PAU	PER	HOC	SIL	SPA	MAG	EST	MUG	HOC			2nd	57
1996	Lola T96/50	Zytek	A	(Austria) Oliver Tichy	11	DNQ	6	Ret	Ret	8	Ret	Ret	7	3			2nd	57
1996	Lola T96/50	Zytek	A	(Germany) Jörg Müller	2	1	2	2	Ret	1	3	**2**	2	**Ret**			2nd	57
1997	Lola T96/50	Zytek	A		SIL	PAU	HEL	NÜR	PER	HOC	A1R	SPA	MUG	JER			2nd	40.5
1997	Lola T96/50	Zytek	A	(Australia) Craig Lowndes	14	Ret	Ret	Ret	4	Ret	Ret	Ret	21	9			2nd	40.5
1997	Lola T96/50	Zytek	A	(Colombia) Juan Pablo Montoya	Ret	**1**	**Ret**	4	11	5	**1**	DSQ	3	1			2nd	40.5
1998: "RSM Marko" did not compete.
1999	Lola B99/50	Zytek	A		IMO	MON	CAT	MAG	SIL	A1R	HOC	HUN	SPA	NÜR			15th	3
1999	Lola B99/50	Zytek	A	(Brazil) Enrique Bernoldi	9	15	Ret	12	20	Ret	5	8	DNQ	DNQ			15th	3
1999	Lola B99/50	Zytek	A	(Austria) Markus Friesacher	DNQ	DNQ	DNQ										15th	3
1999	Lola B99/50	Zytek	A	(Brazil) Ricardo Maurício				DNQ	DNQ	15	DNQ	9	6	Ret			15th	3
2000	Lola B99/50	Zytek	A		IMO	SIL	CAT	NÜR	MON	MAG	A1R	HOC	HUN	SPA			9th	9
2000	Lola B99/50	Zytek	A	(Brazil) Ricardo Maurício	Ret	Ret	Ret	Ret	Ret	Ret	Ret	14	3	7			9th	9
2000	Lola B99/50	Zytek	A	(Brazil) Enrique Bernoldi	Ret	4	**Ret**	Ret	Ret	23	14	6	6	10			9th	9
2001	Lola B99/50	Zytek	A		INT	IMO	CAT	A1R	MON	NÜR	MAG	SIL	HOC	HUN	SPA	MNZ	5th	22
2001	Lola B99/50	Zytek	A	(Austria) Patrick Friesacher	Ret	5	8	Ret	13^{†}	10	4	19	11	4	10	Ret	5th	22
2001	Lola B99/50	Zytek	A	(Spain) Antonio García	Ret	16	10	Ret									5th	22
2001	Lola B99/50	Zytek	A	(Brazil) Ricardo Maurício					6	5	Ret	7	17	2	3	6	5th	22
2002	Lola B02/50	Zytek	A		INT	IMO	CAT	A1R	MON	NÜR	SIL	MAG	HOC	HUN	SPA	MNZ	5th	23
2002	Lola B02/50	Zytek	A	(Austria) Patrick Friesacher	10	5	11	5	2	4	7	7	Ret	6	16	Ret	5th	23
2002	Lola B02/50	Zytek	A	(Brazil) Ricardo Maurício	3	Ret	4	15	7	9	Ret	10	Ret	11	5	Ret	5th	23
2003	Lola B02/50	Zytek	A		IMO	CAT	A1R	MON	NÜR	MAG	SIL	HOC	HUN	MNZ			2nd	75
2003	Lola B02/50	Zytek	A	(Italy) Vitantonio Liuzzi	4	Ret	4	Ret	2	4	3	4	**9**	4			2nd	75
2003	Lola B02/50	Zytek	A	(Austria) Patrick Friesacher	2	Ret			Ret	11	5	3	1	2			2nd	75
2003	Lola B02/50	Zytek	A	(Austria) Bernhard Auinger			11	9									2nd	75
