= Jason Watt =

Danish racing driver (born 1970)

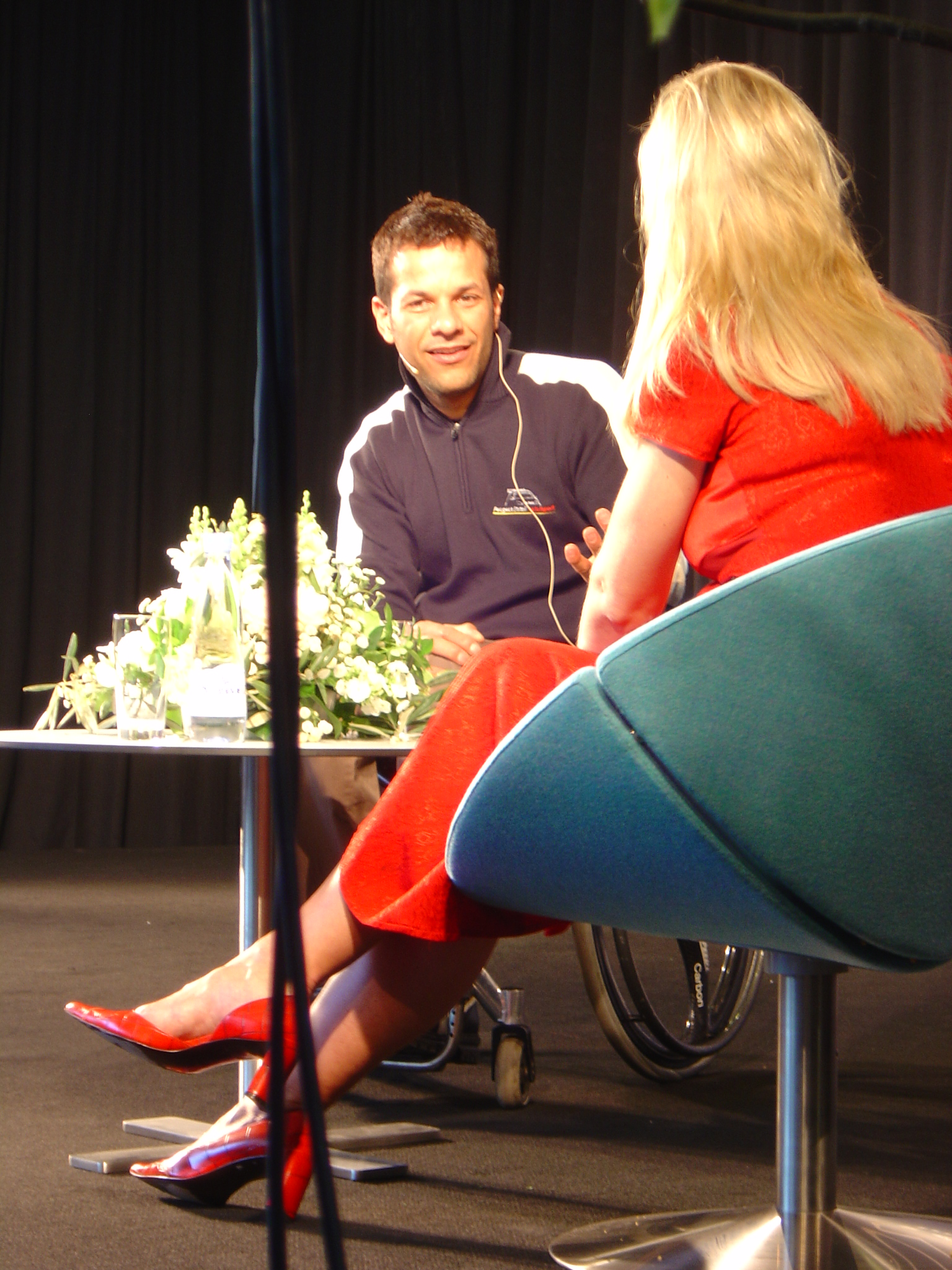
Jason Watt in 2004 being interviewed by Annette Heick.

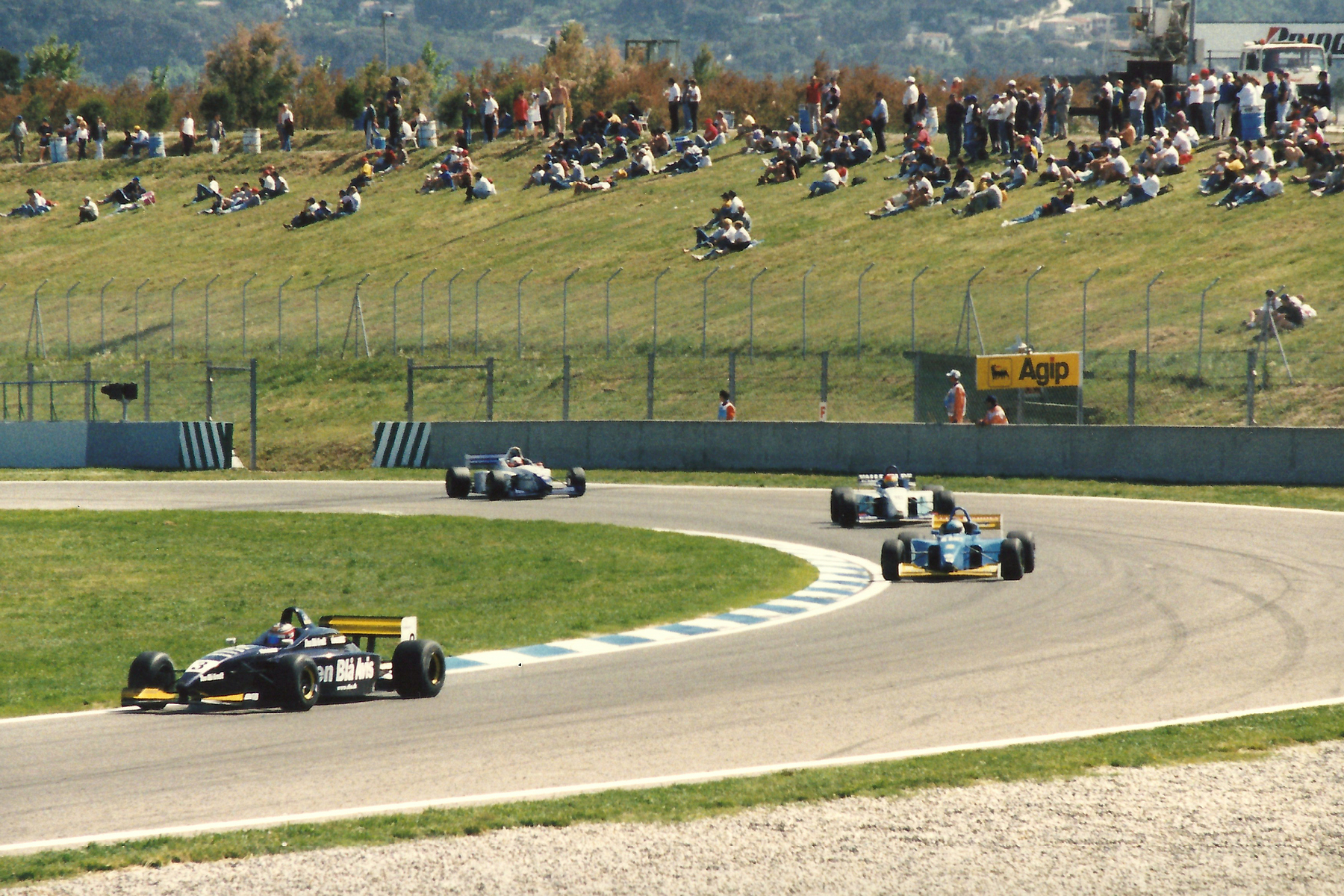
Jason Watt driving for Den Blå Avis (Super Nova Racing) during the Formula 3000 race at the Circuit de Catalunya in 1998.

Jason Charles Watt (born 24 February 1970) is a Danish racing driver. Watt enjoyed a fruitful karting career before moving into Formula Ford in 1992. He graduated to the British Formula Vauxhall Lotus Winter Series in 1993, winning the championship, as well as winning the following years Brands Hatch Formula Ford Festival, and British Formula Ford championship.

In 1995, Watt won the Formula Opel Euroseries and had a one-off outing in the German Formula Three Championship. In 1996, he followed several other "coming men" of the time, such as Dario Franchitti, Juan Pablo Montoya and Jan Magnussen, into the International Touring Car Championship, driving a JAS Engineering entered Alfa Romeo. He also kept his single-seater ambitions alive by contesting a round of the British Formula 2 championship for Fred Goddard Racing.

Watt's career had progressed as far as the International Formula 3000 championship by 1997, where he was a consistent frontrunner and was recognised as one of the best up and coming talents. In 1997 and 1998, Watt drove for David Sears' Super Nova Racing team, under the Den Blå Avis banner, in deference to his major sponsor. He won one race each year. For 1999, he was promoted to the main Super Nova Racing squad and was a championship contender, winning twice and finishing the year as championship runner-up.

Watt's single-seater career was curtailed by a motorcycle accident during the off-season late in 1999 which left him paralysed from the chest down. He has since continued to race successfully in touring cars driving specially modified cars, and in 2002 won the Danish Touring Car Championship.

In March 2008, Watt formed his own touring car team with a car from SEAT. Team Bygma Jason Watt Racing raced at the 2009 FIA WTCC Race of Germany.

In 2012, Watt moved from touring cars to Legends car racing. He also acts as team manager of Team Wounded Racing endurance team whose drivers are more or less physically disabled Afghanistan war veterans. All drivers have either amputations or spinal cord injuries.

== Personal life ==
Watt is the father of three. He has been married to the Danish TV-host Mai-Britt Vingsøe, with whom he has the twins Noah and Filuca. Vingsøe and Watt divorced in 2003. His second marriage was to Sara Matthiesen in 2007, with whom he has the son Silas. They divorced in 2008 after only 17 months of marriage. In 2016, Watt married Majbrit Heidi Berthelsen.

Watt's son Noah Watt is a racing driver, currently competing in the inaugural Danish F4.

== Racing record ==
=== Complete International Touring Car Championship results ===
(key) (Races in bold indicate pole position) (Races in italics indicate fastest lap)

Year	Team	Car	1		2		3		4		5		6		7		8		9		10		11		12		13		Position	Points
1996	Bosch JAS Motorsport Alfa Romeo	Alfa Romeo 155 V6 Ti	HOC; 1 Ret	HOC; 2 Ret	NÜR; 1; 13	NÜR; 2; 9	EST; 1; 15	EST; 2 DNS	HEL; 1 DNS	HEL; 2 DNS	NOR; 1; 15	NOR; 2 DNS	DIE; 1; 22	DIE; 2; 12	SIL; 1; 8	SIL; 2; 3	NÜR; 1; 14	NÜR; 2 Ret	MAG; 1 Ret	MAG; 2; 12	MUG; 1; 14	MUG; 2 Ret	HOC; 1 Ret	HOC; 2 Ret	INT; 1	INT; 2	SUZ; 1	SUZ; 2	20th	17

=== Complete International Formula 3000 results ===
(key) (Races in bold indicate pole position) (Races in italics indicate fastest lap)

Year	Entrant	1	2	3	4	5	6	7	8	9	10	11	12	DC	Points
1997	Den Blå Avis	SIL; 4	PAU; 12	HEL; DNS	NÜR; 2	PER; Ret	HOC; 4	A1R; Ret	SPA; 1	MUG; 2	JER; Ret			**3rd**	**25**
1998	Den Blå Avis	OSC; 7	IMO; 1	CAT; 7	SIL; 3	MON; Ret	PAU; Ret	A1R; 3	HOC; 2	HUN; 10	SPA; 8	PER; Ret	NÜR; 2	4th	30
1999	Super Nova Racing	IMO; Ret	MON; 2	CAT; Ret	MAG; Ret	SIL; 10	A1R; 4	HOC; 7	HUN; 6	**SPA**; 1	**NÜR**; 1			**2nd**	**30**

=== Complete Danish Touring Car Championship results ===
(key) (Races in bold indicate pole position) (Races in italics indicate fastest lap)

Team	Year	Car	1		2		3		4		5		6		7		8		9		10		11	Position	Points
2001	Peugeot Statoil Motorsport	Peugeot 306 GTi	JYL; 1; 1	JYL; 2; 3	DJR; 1; 4	DJR; 2 Ret	JYL; 1; 4	JYL; 2; 5	KNU; 1; 1	KNU; 2; 1	DJR; 1; 4	DJR; 2 Ret	JYL; 1; 1	JYL; 2; 1	JYL; 1 Ret	JYL; 2; 4	JYL; 1; 4	JYL; 2; 3						2nd	140
2002	Peugeot Statoil Motorsport	Peugeot 307 GTi	JYL; 1; 3	JYL; 2; 3	DJR; 1; 5	DJR; 2; 4	JYL; 1; 2	JYL; 2; 2	KNU; 1; 2	KNU; 2; 5	DJR; 1 Ret	DJR; 2; 4	JYL; 1; 1	JYL; 2; 6	JYL; 1; 3	JYL; 2 Ret	JYL; 1; 5	JYL; 2; 4						1st	298
2003	Peugeot Statoil Motorsport	Peugeot 307 GTi	JYL; 1 Ret	JYL; 2 Ret	MAN; 1 Ret	MAN; 2; 8	JYL; 1; 5	JYL; 2; 2	PAD; 1 Ret	PAD; 2 Ret	KNU; 1; 5	KNU; 2; 5	DJU; 1; 6	DJU; 2; 3	JYL; 1; 7	JYL; 2; 4	JYL; 1; 3	JYL; 2; 5	JYL; 2; 9	JYL; 1; 4				6th	152
2004	Peugeot Statoil Motorsport	Peugeot 307 GTi	JYL; 1; 14	JYL; 2 DNS	PAD; 1 Ret	PAD; 2; 6	JYL; 1; 3	JYL; 2; 1	KNU; 1 Ret	KNU; 2 Ret	DJR; 1; 14	DJR; 2; 6	JYL; 1; 5	JYL; 2 Ret	PAD; 1; 9	PAD; 2; 15	JYL; 1; 7	JYL; 2; 7						12th	94
2005	Volvo Motorsport Danmark	Volvo S60	JYL; 1 ?	JYL; 2 ?	PAD; 1 ?	PAD; 2 ?	JYL; 1 ?	JYL; 2; 5	STU; 1 ?	STU; 2 ?	DJU; 1; 7	DJU; 2; 7	JYL; 1; 9	JYL; 2 ?	JYL; 1; 10	JYL; 2 ?	PAD; 1; 7	PAD; 2; 4	JYL; 1 ?	JYL; 2 ?				11th	83
2006	Autoforum Racing Team	Peugeot 307	JYL; 1; 14	JYL; 2 Ret	PAD; 1 Ret	PAD; 2; 12	STU; 1; 11	STU; 2; 11	DJU; 1; 13	DJU; 2; 13	JYL; 1; 9	JYL; 2; 11	JYL; 1; 12	JYL; 2 Ret	PAD; 1; 19	PAD; 2; 9	PAD; 1; 8	PAD; 2; 7	JYL; 1; 14	JYL; 2; 14				12th	66
2007	Den Blå Avis	BMW 320	JYL; 1; 14	JYL; 2; 13	JYL; 3 Ret	STU; 1; 5	STU; 2; 7	STU; 3; 4	JYL; 1; 18	JYL; 2; 11	JYL; 3; 21	PAD; 1; 11	PAD; 2 Ret	PAD; 3 Ret	PAD; 1 Ret	PAD; 2; 8	PAD; 3; 8	JYL; 1; 8	JYL; 2; 7	JYL; 3; 7	PAD; 1; 21	PAD; 2 Ret	PAD; 3; 14	13th	107
2008	SEAT	Seat Leon	JYL; 1; 25	JYL; 2; 16	JYL; 3; 7	DJU; 1; 8	DJU; 2; 2	DJU; 3; 4	JYL; 1; 8	JYL; 2; 3	JYL; 3; 7	JYL; 1; 11	JYL; 2; 6	JYL; 3; 5	STU; 1; 10	STU; 2; 8	STU; 3 Ret	PAD; 1; 6	PAD; 2; 1	PAD; 3; 4	JYL; 1; 4	JYL; 2; 4	JYL; 3; 16	6th	212
2009	Team Bygma Jason Watt Racing	Seat Leon	JYL; 1; 4	JYL; 2; 8	JYL; 3; 5	PAD; 1; 4	PAD; 2; 3	PAD; 3; 2	JYL; 1; 7	JYL; 2; 3	JYL; 3; 4	PAD; 1 Ret	PAD; 2; 5	PAD; 3; 4	JYL; 1; 4	JYL; 2; 6	JYL; 3; 3	DJU; 1; 8	DJU; 2; 8	DJU; 3; 5	JYL; 1; 5	JYL; 2; 12	JYL; 3 Ret	6th	190
2010	Team Bygma Jason Watt Racing	Seat Leon	JYL; 1; 4	JYL; 2; 3	PAD; 1; 4	PAD; 2; 6	GÖT; 1; 3	GÖT; 2 Ret	JYL; 1; 2	JYL; 2; 1	DJU; 1; 4	DJU; 2 Ret	JYL; 1; 3	JYL; 2; 3	KNU; 1; 5	KNU; 2; 2	JYL; 1; 1	JYL; 2; 5						3rd	184.5

=== Complete WTCC results ===
(key) (Races in bold indicate pole position) (Races in italics indicate fastest lap)

Year	Team	Car	1	2	3	4	5	6	7	8	9	10	11	12	13	14	15	16	17	18	19	20	21	22	23	24	Position	Points
2009	Team Bygma Jason Watt Racing	SEAT León 2.0 TFSI	CUR; 1	CUR; 2	PUE; 1	PUE; 2	MAR; 1	MAR; 2	PAU; 1	PAU; 2	VAL; 1	VAL; 2	BRN; 1	BRN; 2	POR; 1	POR; 2	BRH; 1	BRH; 2	OSC; 1 Ret	OSC; 2; 19	IMO; 1	IMO; 2	OKA; 1	OKA; 2	MAC; 1	MAC; 2	38th	0

=== Complete Scandinavian Touring Car Championship results ===
(key) (Races in bold indicate pole position) (Races in italics indicate fastest lap)

Team	Year	Car	1		2		3		4		5		6		7		8		9		Position	Points
2011	Team Bygma Jason Watt Racing	Seat Leon	JYL; 1; 1	JYL; 2 Ret	KNU; 1; 12	KNU; 2; 9	MAN; 1	MAN; 2	GÖT; 1	GÖT; 2	FAL; 1	FAL; 2	KAR; 1	KAR; 2	JYL; 1; 12	JYL; 2 Ret	KNU; 1 Ret	KNU; 2 DNS	MAN; 1	MAN; 2	**17th**	**27**

Sporting positions
Preceded by Russell Ingall	Formula Ford Festival Winner; 1994	Succeeded by Kevin McGarrity
Preceded by Russell Ingall	British Formula Ford Champion; 1994	Succeeded by Bas Leinders
Preceded by Michael Carlsen	Danish Touring Car Champion; 2002	Succeeded by Jan Magnussen
