= Oliver Tichy =

Austrian racing driver

- Born: 6 May 1975 (age 51); Vienna, Austria
- Occupation: Former racing driver
- Years active: 1992–2001

International Formula 3000
- Years active: 1992–2001
- Teams: RSM Marko; Pacific Racing; Coloni Motorsport
- Best finish: 7th in 1997

Previous series
- 1992; 1993; 1994–1995; 1996–1998; 2001: German Formula Three Championship; German Formula Ford Championship; EFDA Formula Ford 1600 Championship; Formula Ford 1800 Germany; FIA GT Championship

Championship titles
- 1997: Bologna Motorshow F3000 Sprint

Oliver Tichy (born 6 May 1975) is an Austrian former racing driver from Vienna.

After a successful youth karting career, Tichy moved to the German Formula Ford championship in 1992 and to the EFDA Formula Ford 1600 Championship in 1993 where he finished fifth. In 1993, he also raced in Formula Ford 1800 Germany, winning three times. In 1994, he made his professional debut in the German Formula Three Championship, however, he only scored five points and finished 24th in the championship. In 1995, he stayed in German F3 but switched from Volkswagen to Opel and improved to 11th in points.

He moved up to International Formula 3000 in 1996 with the RSM Marko team and finished tenth in points, finishing on the podium in third at the season finale at Hockenheimring. Tichy returned to the series in 1997 with Pacific Racing. He finished a career-best second at the Helsinki Thunder round but left the team after eight races.

He returned to the series with the Coloni Motorsport team for the season finale at Circuito de Jerez and delivered by again finishing in second place on the podium. He finished seventh in the championship despite missing a race. He was away from racing after that until midway through the 1998 season when he returned to the Coloni team. He failed to score points in any of his races with Coloni in 1998.

Tichy's final professional race appearance came in 2001 when he appeared in a single race in the FIA GT Championship.
