= Grégoire de Galzain =

French racing driver

Grégoire Xavier Jacques Gabriel de Galzain (born 23 December 1971 in Versailles) is a retired French racing driver.

== Racing record ==
Formule 3 France results
Year	Entrant	Chassis	Engine	1	2	3	4	5	6	7	8	9	10	11	12	13	14	Pos.	Pts
1996	**Graff Racing**	Dallara F396	Opel	NOG 5	NOG 4	LED 2	MAG 4	MAG 7	PAU 10	DIJ Ret	LEV 2	ALB Ret	ALB Ret	LEM 7	LEM Ret	CAS 4	CAS 3	6th	56

=== Complete International Formula 3000 results ===
(key) (Races in bold indicate pole position; races in italics indicate fastest lap.)

Year	Entrant	Chassis	Engine	1	2	3	4	5	6	7	8	9	10	11	12	Pos.	Pts
1997	DAMS	Lola T96/50	Zytek-Judd	SIL; DNQ	PAU; DNQ	HEL; DNQ	NÜR; 17	PER; 9	HOC; 9	A1R; 15	SPA; Ret	MUG; EX	JER; 7			24th	0
1998	DAMS	Lola T96/50	Zytek-Judd	OSC; Ret	IMO; Ret	CAT; 18	SIL; 23	MON; DNPQ	PAU; DNQ	A1R; Ret	HOC; 17	HUN; Ret	SPA; 25	PER; 10	NÜR; 16	32nd	0
1999	Cica Team Oreca	Lola T99/50	Zytek	IMO; DNQ	MON; DNQ	CAT; DNQ	MAG; DNQ	SIL	A1R	HOC	HUN	SPA	NÜR			NC	0
