= Cyrille Sauvage =

French racing driver (born 1973)

- Nationality: (France) French
- Born: 16 January 1973 (age 53) Cannes, France

Cyrille Sauvage (born 16 January 1973 in Cannes) is a French racing driver. He has competed in such series as International Formula 3000 and Porsche Supercup. He won both the Championnat de France Formule Renault and the Eurocup Formula Renault in 1995.

== Racing record ==
=== Complete International Formula 3000 results ===
(key) (Races in bold indicate pole position; races in italics indicate fastest lap.)

Year	Entrant	Chassis	Engine	1	2	3	4	5	6	7	8	9	10	11	12	Pos.	Pts
1996	Apomatox	Lola T96/50	Zytek-Judd	NÜR; Ret	PAU; 7	PER; Ret	HOC; 7	SIL; 10	SPA; 7	MAG; Ret	EST; 13	MUG; 12	HOC; 6			17th	1
1997	Draco Engineering	Lola T96/50	Zytek-Judd	SIL; 7	PAU; 5	HEL; Ret	NÜR; 23†	PER; 8	HOC; Ret	A1R; Ret	SPA; 4	MUG; 9	JER; DSQ			13th	5
1998	GP Racing	Lola T96/50	Zytek-Judd	OSC; 5	IMO; Ret	CAT; 11	SIL; Ret	MON; 15	PAU; Ret	A1R; 13	HOC; Ret	HUN; 8	SPA; 20	PER	NÜR	19th	2
1999	Monaco Motorsport	Lola T99/50	Zytek	IMO	MON	CAT	MAG	SIL; DNQ	A1R; 14	HOC; 11	HUN; DNQ	SPA				NC	0
1999	Draco Engineering	Lola T99/50	Zytek										NÜR; 14			NC	0

Sporting positions
Preceded by Stéphane Sarrazin	Championnat de France Formule Renault champion 1995	Succeeded by Sébastien Enjolras
Preceded by James Matthews	Eurocup Formula Renault 2.0; 1995	Succeeded by Enrique Bernoldi
