= Laurent Redon =

French racing driver

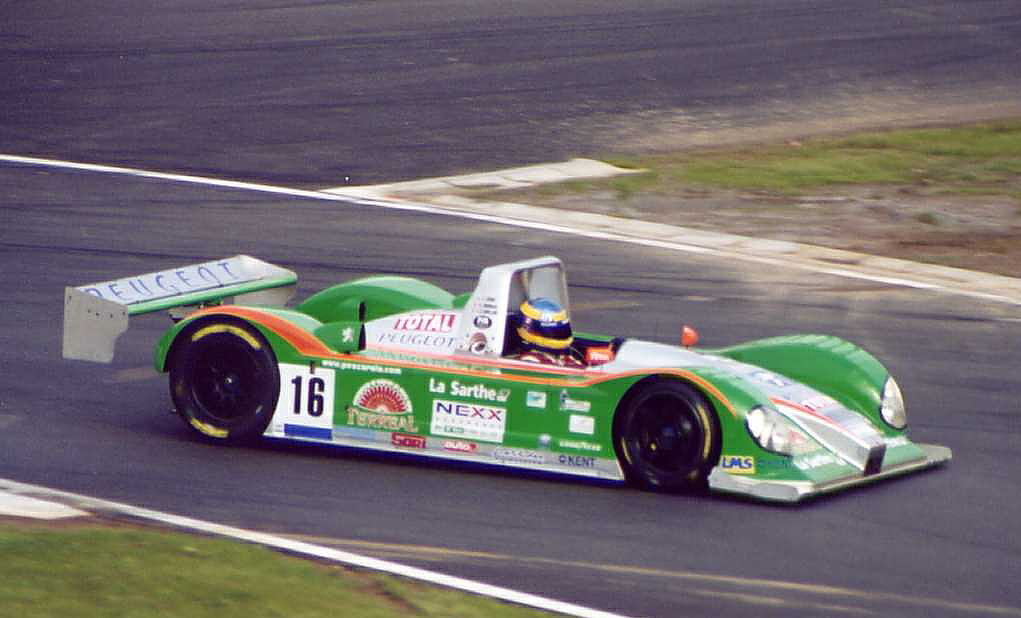
- Redon in 2001
- Nationality: (France) French
- Born: 5 August 1973 (age 53) Loire, France

IRL IndyCar Series
- Years active: 2001–2002
- Teams: Conquest Racing
- Starts: 17
- Wins: 0
- Podiums: 1
- Poles: 0
- Best finish: 12th in 2002

24 Hours of Le Mans career
- Years: 2001
- Teams: Pescarolo Sport
- Best finish: 13th
- Class wins: 0

Championship titles
- 1995: French Formula Three Championship

Awards
- 2002: IndyCar Rookie of the Year

Laurent Redon (born 5 August 1973) is a former race car driver from Loire, France.

Redon began his professional racing career in the French Formula Three Championship, winning it in 1995. He then moved to International Formula 3000 where he finished eighth in the points for DAMS in 1996 and 9th for Super Nova Racing the following year. His best F3000 finish was a third place at A1-Ring in 1997.

Redon was then a test driver for the Formula One teams Minardi in 1998 and Benetton in 1999 and also competed for the top team in the Sports Racing World Cup JB Geisse Team Ferrari in 1999. In 2001 he drove in the European Le Mans Series and FIA Sportscar Championship for Pescarolo Sport, winning races in both series and finishing 13th in the 2001 24 Hours of Le Mans. After that, he drove for Mi-Jack Conquest Racing in the Indy Racing League IndyCar Series beginning with the final two races of the 2001 season.

Redon returned to the team for a full year in 2002, including the 2002 Indianapolis 500, with a best finish of third at California Speedway. He finished twelfth in points and won Rookie of the Year honors. He did not return to the series the following year and came back to France because of the birth of his daughter, becoming the first and only series rookie of the year to do so. He later operated a racing team that competed in the Superleague Formula.

== Racing career results ==
=== Complete International Formula 3000 results ===
(key) (Races in bold indicate pole position) (Races in italics indicate fastest lap)

| Year | Entrant | 1 | 2 | 3 | 4 | 5 | 6 | 7 | 8 | 9 | 10 | DC | Points |
|---|---|---|---|---|---|---|---|---|---|---|---|---|---|
| 1996 | DAMS | NÜR; 6 | PAU; Ret | PER; 10 | HOC; Ret | SIL; Ret | SPA; 12 | MAG; 4 | EST; DSQ | MUG; 8 | HOC; 4 | 8th | 7 |
| 1997 | Super Nova Racing | SIL; Ret | PAU; 4 | HEL; Ret | NÜR; 21 | PER; 6 | HOC; Ret | A1R; 3 | SPA; 14 | MUG; 5 | JER; 11 | 9th | 10 |

=== 24 Hours of Le Mans results ===
| Year | Team | Co-Drivers | Car | Class | Laps | Pos. | Class Pos. |
|---|---|---|---|---|---|---|---|
| 2001 | (France) Pescarolo Sport | (France) Sébastien Bourdais (France) Jean-Christophe Boullion | Courage C60-Peugeot | LMP900 | 271 | 13th | 4th |

=== IndyCar Series results ===
(key)

| Year | Team | 1 | 2 | 3 | 4 | 5 | 6 | 7 | 8 | 9 | 10 | 11 | 12 | 13 | 14 | 15 | Rank | Points | Ref |
|---|---|---|---|---|---|---|---|---|---|---|---|---|---|---|---|---|---|---|---|
| 2001 | Conquest Racing | PHX | HMS | ATL | INDY | TXS | PPIR | RIR | KAN | NSH | KTY | STL | CHI; 7 | TX2; 11 | | | **29th** | **45** | |
| 2002 | Conquest Racing | HMS; 15 | PHX; 14 | FON; 3 | NZR; 15 | INDY; 22 | TXS; 15 | PPIR; 7 | RIR; 15 | KAN; 22 | NSH; 16 | MIS; 11 | KTY; 20 | STL; 22 | CHI; 25 | TX2; 10 | **12th** | **229** | |

Sporting positions
| Preceded by Jean-Philippe Belloc | French Formula Three; Champion; 1995 | Succeeded by Soheil Ayari |
| Preceded by Felipe Giaffone | IndyCar Series; Rookie of the Year; 2002 | Succeeded by Dan Wheldon |
