= David Cook (racing driver) =

British racing driver

- Nationality: British
- Born: 3 April 1975 (age 51) Rotherham, England
- Retired: 1999
- Relatives: Derek Cook; Paula Cook; Jake Cook

British Formula 3 Championship
- Years active: 1998
- Teams: DC Cook Motorsports
- Starts: 8
- Wins: 0
- Poles: 0
- Fastest laps: 0
- Best finish: 18th in 1998

Previous series
- 1997-1998 1996 1996 1995 1995-1996 1994: International Formula 3000; British Formula Two Championship; Formula Renault Eurocup; French Formula Renault; Formula Renault UK; Formula Vauxhall Junior

Championship titles
- 1996: Formula Renault UK

David Cook (born 3 April 1975) is a British former racing driver, most notable for winning the British Formula Renault Championship in 1996, and for entering the International Formula 3000 series briefly in 1997 and 1998, driving for the family-run DC Cook Motorsports team.

== Racing career ==
Born in Rotherham, Cook made his motor racing debut in 1994 in the Formula Vauxhall Junior series. For 1995, he stepped up into the Formula Renault UK series, finishing seventh overall, whilst also entering two rounds of the Championnat de France Formule Renault for Lewis Motorsport. He remained in the British series for 1996, taking the title with three wins. He also entered two rounds of the British Formula Two Championship, driving for Super Nova, and also entered the Formula Renault Eurocup, finishing sixth overall, with one win. For 1997, he entered six of the ten rounds of the International Formula 3000 series, driving for the family-run DC Cook Motorsports team, without scoring any points. In 1998, he entered a single round of the Formula 3000 series, this time for Redman Bright, whilst also competing in eight rounds of the British Formula 3 Championship, taking ten points and finishing 18th overall. He retired at the end of the 1998 season.

Sporting positions
Preceded by Guy Smith	British Formula Renault; UK series champion 1996	Succeeded by Marc Hynes
