= Bas Leinders =

Belgian racing driver

- Nationality: Belgian
- Born: 16 July 1975 (age 51) Bree, Belgium
- Categorisation: FIA Platinum (until 2017); FIA Gold (2018–2021); FIA Silver (2022–)

Bas Leinders (born 16 July 1975) is a Belgian retired professional racing driver. He was a Formula One test and reserve driver in 2004 for the Minardi F1 team, taking part in the Friday practice sessions during Grand Prix weekends, making seventeen appearances in all. He is also a former British Formula Ford and German Formula Three champion, winning the titles in 1995 and 1998 respectively.

== Career ==
Born in Bree, Leinders was one of the most successful Belgian racing drivers of the nineties and the beginning of the 21st century. He started his career in karting, winning his very first race. At the age of fourteen, he was already a European Champion beating Jarno Trulli, Ralph Firman and others. In 1992, Leinders was an official works driver for the Italian Tony Kart outfit.

Leinders started his car racing career in Formula Ford. He was not only crowned Benelux Champion but he also obtained the pole position at the prestigious Formula Ford Festival at his first participation, later becoming European and British Formula Ford Champion. Not being able to gather enough money to make the step to Formula Three, Leinders stepped up to the European Formula Opel Championship (for Van Amersfoort Racing). With a record of eight wins, he secured the Championship several races before the end.

With some more backing, Leinders graduated to the German Formula 3 series with VAR. He finished second in his maiden F3 weekend just behind Nick Heidfeld. In his second year, he won the championship and was invited by the McLaren Junior team to partner Nick Heidfeld in the last race of the Formula 3000 season. Leinders obtained his best F3000 results in 2001, finishing second twice behind Tomáš Enge and Justin Wilson respectively.

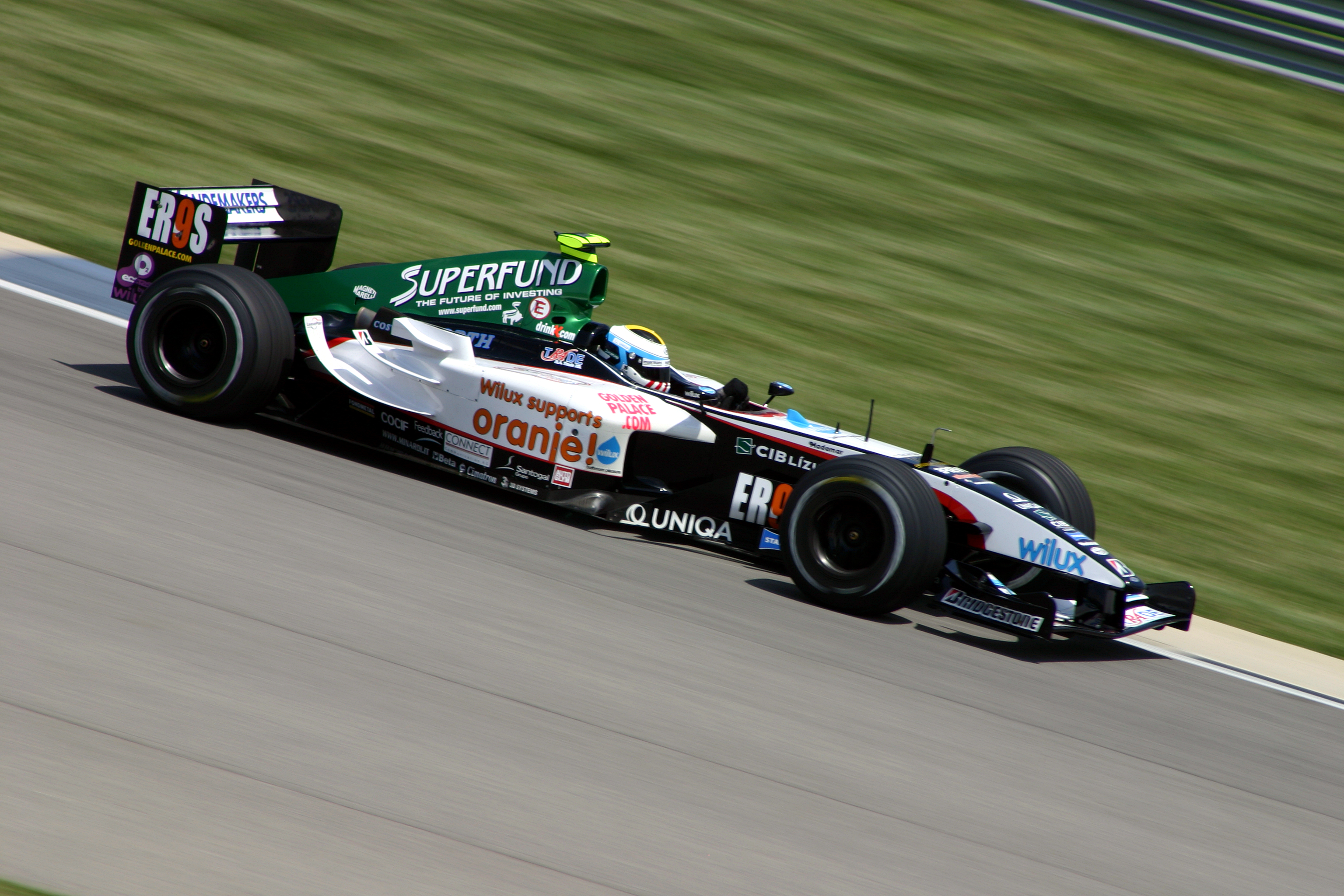
Leinders driving for Minardi during free practice for the 2004 United States Grand Prix

In 2002 and 2003, Leinders competed in the World Series by Nissan, finishing third in the Championship on both occasions. His good performance in this series and especially winning the last race of the season gave him the opportunity to test with the Jordan F1 Team which resulted in a contract with the Minardi F1 Team as an official Friday Test and reserve driver in the 2004 FIA Formula One World Championship.

Leinders was pre-selected several times by journalists for the title "Belgian Sportsman of the Year". Leinders was crowned "Champion of Belgium" in 2001 by the Royal Automobile Club of Belgium, the award presented by Crown-prince of Belgium, Prince Philippe. The Belgian also won the Golden Helmet in 2004 for his performances in Formula One with the Minardi F1 Team.

From 2005, Leinders was a regular racer in the FIA GT Championship with Belgian Racing, driving a Belgian-built Gillet Vertigo. In 2011, he became the team principal of the rebranded Marc VDS Racing, which was also his last year as full-time driver.

In 2014, Leinders ran the entire season of the NASCAR Whelen Euro Series with Marc VDS Racing's Toyota Camry in the Elite 1 category. He finished the season in 14th place in the standings with two top-five finishes, one at Brands Hatch and one at Le Mans.

After Marc VDS's victory in the 2015 24 Hours of Spa, Leinders announced he parted ways with the team.

In 2016, Leinders became sporting manager of the McLaren GT factory programme and team manager of Garage 59. In 2018, he joined Optimum Motorsport.

Leinders has also worked as a colour analyst on Formula One broadcasts on Telenet's Play Sports.

== Racing record ==
=== Career summary ===
Season	Series	Team	Races	Wins	Podiums	Pole positions	F.Laps	Points	Position
1994	European Formula Ford	MB Racing	?	?	?	?	?	13	8th
1994	Belgian Formula Ford Championship	MB Racing	?	?	?	?	?	?	**1st**
1995	British Formula Ford Championship	Swift Racing Cars	?	?	?	?	?	127	**1st**
1995	European Formula Ford Championship	Swift Racing Cars	?	?	?	?	?	55	**1st**
1995	Formula Ford Festival	Swift Racing Cars	1	0	0	0	0	N/A	DNF
1996	European Formula Opel	Van Amersfoort Racing	16	7	10	?	8	239	**1st**
1997	German Formula Three Championship	Van Amersfoort Racing	18	0	4	2	1	100	7th
1997	Masters of Formula 3	Van Amersfoort Racing	1	0	0	0	0	N/A	DNF
1997	Macau Grand Prix	Van Amersfoort Racing	1	0	0	0	0	N/A	DNF
1997	Monaco Grand Prix	Van Amersfoort Racing	1	0	0	0	0	N/A	7th
1998	German Formula Three Championship	Van Amersfoort Racing	20	7	10	9	4	200	**1st**
1998	Masters of Formula 3	Van Amersfoort Racing	1	0	0	0	0	N/A	DNF
1998	Macau Grand Prix	Van Amersfoort Racing	1	0	0	0	1	N/A	8th
1998	Belcar	MW-Racing	?	?	?	?	?	212	7th
1999	International F3000	KTR	7	0	0	0	0	1	23rd
2000	International F3000	Kid Jensen Racing	9	0	0	0	0	0	NC
2000	Belgian Procar	MG Racing	7	0	1	1	1	67	9th
2000	Belcar GTB	Team Beliën	?	?	?	?	?	?	**1st**
2001	International F3000	KTR	12	0	2	0	0	17	7th
2002	FIA GT Championship	Carsport Holland	1	0	0	0	0	0	NC
2002	World Series by Nissan	KTR	18	2	8	2	6	184	**3rd**
2003	World Series by Nissan	Racing Engineering	18	2	4	2	1	128	**3rd**
2004	Formula One	Minardi	Test driver						
2005	FIA GT Championship	Belgian Racing	5	3	3	3	2	N/A	–
2006	FIA GT Championship - G2	Belgian Racing	9	?	?	?	?	?	**1st**
2007	FIA GT Championship - G2	Belgian Racing	8	?	?	?	?	?	**1st**
2008	FIA GT Championship - G2	Belgian Racing	8	5	6	5	0	100	**1st**
2009	FIA GT Championship - GT1	Marc VDS Racing Team	8	0	0	0	0	9	14th

=== Career highlights ===
- 2014 NASCAR Whelen Euro Series – Marc VDS Racing Team
- 2010 FIA GT1 World Championship – Marc VDS Racing Team
- 2009 FIA GT Championship – Ford GT
- 2008 FIA GT Championship – Gillet Vertigo 1st G2
- 2007 FIA GT Championship – Gillet Vertigo 1st G2
- 2006 FIA GT Championship – Gillet Vertigo 1st G2
- 2005 FIA GT Championship – Gillet Vertigo – 3 class wins
- 2004 Formula One World Championship test driver in Minardi-Cosworth F1 Team. Did not participate in races
- 2003 3rd place – Superfund World Series – 2 wins.
- 2003 Winner TA Class 24 hours of Zolder in a BMW M3 GTR
- 2002 24 h of Spa in a Chrysler Viper GTS-R
- 2002 3rd place – Telefónica World Series – 2 wins .
- 2002 4th in 24 hours of Zolder in a BMW Z3
- 2001 Formula 3000 Championship – KTR 2-second places.
- 2000 Formula 3000 Championship – Kid Jensen Racing.
- 1999 Formula 3000 Championship – Witmeur Team KTR .
- 1999 3rd 24 hours of Spa
- 1998 German Formula 3 Champion
- 1998 2nd 24 hours of Zolder
- 1997 7th German Formula 3 Championship
- 1996 European Formula Opel Champion
- 1995 British and European Formula Ford Champion
- 1994 Benelux Formula Ford Champion
- 1992 Vice-European and Belgian Kart Champion
- 1991 Belgian Kart Champion
- 1990 European Kart Champion

=== Complete German Formula Three results ===
(key) (Races in bold indicate pole position) (Races in italics indicate fastest lap)

Year	Entrant	Engine	Class	1	2	3	4	5	6	7	8	9	10	11	12	13	14	15	16	17	18	19	20	DC	Pts
1997	Van Amersfoort Racing	Opel	A	HOC; 1; 4	HOC; 2; 2	NÜR; 1; 6	NÜR; 2; 6	**SAC**; **1**; 3	SAC; 2; 2	**NOR**; **1**; 16	NOR; 2 Ret	WUN; 1; 8	WUN; 2 Ret	ZWE; 1; 8	ZWE; 2 Ret	SAL; 1; 6	SAL; 2 Ret	LAH; 1; 4	LAH; 2; 3	NÜR; 1; 9	NÜR; 2; 11			7th	100
1998	Van Amersfoort Racing	Opel	A	HOC; 1; 1	**HOC**; **2**; 1	**NÜR**; **1**; 16	NÜR; 2; 7	**SAC**; **1**; 1	**SAC**; **2**; 1	NOR; 1; 2	NOR; 2; 6	LAH; 1; 7	LAH; 2; 7	WUN; 1 Ret	WUN; 2 Ret	**ZWE**; **1**; 1	**ZWE**; **2**; 2	SAL; 1; 14	SAL; 2; 3	**OSC**; **1**; 1	**OSC**; **2**; 1	**NÜR**; **1**; 2	NÜR; 2 Ret	1st	200

=== Complete International Formula 3000 results ===
(key) (Races in bold indicate pole position) (Races in italics indicate fastest lap)

Year	Entrant	1	2	3	4	5	6	7	8	9	10	11	12	DC	Points
1998	West Competition	OSC	IMO	CAT	SIL	MON	PAU	A1R	HOC	HUN	SPA	PER	NÜR; DNS	NC	0
1999	Witmeur KTR	IMO; DNQ	MON; DNQ	CAT; Ret	MAG; 6	SIL; 16	A1R; Ret	HOC; Ret	HUN; Ret	SPA; DNQ	NÜR; Ret			23rd	1
2000	Kid Jensen Racing	IMO; 16	SIL; Ret	CAT; 13	NÜR; Ret	MON; Ret	MAG; 10	A1R; 11	HOC; DNQ	HUN; 7	SPA; Ret			NC	0
2001	KTR	INT; 10	IMO; 9	CAT; 2	A1R; 2	MON; Ret	NÜR; 11	MAG; Ret	SIL; 8	HOC; 6	HUN; 6	SPA; 7	MNZ; 4	7th	17

=== Complete Formula One participations ===
(key)

Year	Entrant	Chassis	Engine	1	2	3	4	5	6	7	8	9	10	11	12	13	14	15	16	17	18	WDC	Points
2004	Wilux Minardi Cosworth	Minardi PS04B	Cosworth V10	AUS *	MAL; TD	BHR; TD	SMR; TD	ESP; TD	MON; TD	EUR; TD	CAN; TD	USA; TD	FRA; TD	GBR; TD	GER; TD							–	–
2004	Minardi Cosworth	Minardi PS04B	Cosworth V10													HUN; TD	BEL; TD	ITA; TD	CHN; TD	JPN; TD	BRA; TD	–	–

* Leinders was entered as third driver in Australian Grand Prix but was refused a superlicence until he completed the required mileage in an F1 car. He satisfied this requirement before the next race.

=== Complete GT1 World Championship results ===
Year	Team	Car	1	2	3	4	5	6	7	8	9	10	11	12	13	14	15	16	17	18	19	20	Pos	Points	Ref
2010	Marc VDS Racing Team	Ford	ABU; QR; 6	ABU; CR; 13	SIL; QR; 19	SIL; CR; 8	BRN; QR; 16	BRN; CR; Ret	PRI; QR; 20	PRI; CR; 4	SPA; QR; 9	SPA; CR; Ret	NÜR; QR; Ret	NÜR; CR; 11	ALG; QR; Ret	ALG; CR; 5	NAV; QR; 3	NAV; CR; 5	INT; QR; 11	INT; CR; 5	SAN; QR; 3	SAN; CR; Ret	14th	54	
2011	Marc VDS Racing Team	Ford	ABU; QR; 11	ABU; CR; DNS	ZOL; QR; Ret	ZOL; CR; 10	ALG; QR; Ret	ALG; CR; 10	SAC; QR; Ret	SAC; CR; 8	SIL; QR; 11	SIL; CR; 6	NAV; QR; 12	NAV; CR; 10	PRI; QR; Ret	PRI; CR; 12	ORD; QR; 10	ORD; CR; 10	BEI; QR; Ret	BEI; CR; Ret	SAN; QR; Ret	SAN; CR; 9	22nd	18	

=== 24 Hours of Le Mans results ===
Year	Team	Co-Drivers	Car	Class	Laps	Pos.	Class Pos.
2010	(Belgium) Marc VDS Racing Team	(Belgium) Eric De Doncker (Finland) Markus Palttala	Ford GT1	GT1	26	DNF	DNF
2011	(Belgium) Kronos Racing (Belgium) Marc VDS Racing Team	(Belgium) Vanina Ickx (Belgium) Maxime Martin	Lola-Aston Martin B09/60	LMP1	328	7th	7th
2012	(France) OAK Racing	(Denmark) David Heinemeier Hansson (Belgium) Maxime Martin	Morgan LMP2-Nissan	LMP2	341	14th	7th

=== NASCAR ===
(key) (Bold – Pole position awarded by qualifying time. Italics – Pole position earned by points standings or practice time. * – Most laps led.)

==== Whelen Euro Series – Elite 1 ====
NASCAR Whelen Euro Series – Elite 1 results
Year	Team	No.	Make	1	2	3	4	5	6	7	8	9	10	11	12	NWES	Point	Ref
2014	Racing Club Partners – Marc VDS	32	Toyota	VAL; 13	VAL; 18	BRH; 9	BRH; 5	TOU; 21	TOU; 7	NUR; 19	NUR; 19	UMB; 21	UMB; 21	BUG; 21	BUG; 5	14th	464	

Sporting positions
Preceded by Jason Watt	British Formula Ford Champion; 1995	Succeeded by Kristian Kolby
Preceded by Nick Heidfeld	German Formula Three Champion; 1998	Succeeded by Christijan Albers
