= Ian Morgan (motorsport) =

British engineer

- Citizenship: British
- Occupation: Engineer
- Years active: 1987 - 2024
- Known for: Motorsport Executive and Engineer

Ian Morgan is a British Formula One and motorsport executive and engineer. He was previously the Motorsport Director at McLaren Automotive and Chief Race Engineer at Red Bull Racing.

== Career ==
Morgan studied Mechanical Engineering at the University of Coventry. He began his motorsport career in 1987 with Reynard Motorsport as a graduate race engineer in the British Formula 3 International Series. He then moved to Pacific Racing in the same series, engineering JJ Lehto to the Drivers’ Championship, before becoming Chief Race Engineer at Edenbridge Racing in 1991. In 1995, he joined Tickford Racing as a Vehicle Development Engineer and Programme Manager, working on vehicle development projects across multiple racing programmes.

In 1998, Morgan moved to the McLaren F3000 Team as Senior Race Engineer, initially working with Nicolas Minassian before engineering Nick Heidfeld to the Formula 3000 Drivers’ Championship in 1999. He then progressed into automotive engineering roles with McLaren Automotive in 2001 as Senior Vehicle Development Engineer, working on the McLaren-Mercedes SLR project alongside Gordon Murray.

He joined Red Bull Racing in 2005 as Chief Test and Development Engineer, and was promoted to Head of Race Engineering in 2009, overseeing race engineering operations on the pit-wall through the team's early championship-winning period with Sebastian Vettel.

In 2012, Morgan returned to McLaren as Chief Engineer of the McLaren GT programme, leading the technical development of McLaren's customer racing cars until 2017. He briefly served as Head of Performance and Trackside Engineering at Aston Martin Racing in 2017, before working as an Engineering Consultant with Carlin Motorsport in 2018. In 2019, he undertook a short consultancy role with McLaren Racing supporting its IndyCar programme. Later in 2019, Morgan was appointed Head of Engineering, Motorsport at McLaren Automotive, and was subsequently promoted to Director of Motorsport. In this role, he led McLaren Automotive's customer racing activities and overall motorsport engineering strategy until his retirement in July 2024. He now acts as a motorsports consultant.
