= 1999 International Formula 3000 Championship =

Motor racing competition

The 1999 International Formula 3000 Championship was the thirty-third season of the second-tier of Formula One feeder championship and also fifteenth season under the International Formula 3000 Championship moniker which was an FIA sanctioned motor racing title for drivers of Formula 3000 racing cars. The title was contested over a ten-round series from 1 May to 25 September 1999. This was the first F3000 season in which every International Championship race took place during a Formula One weekend and supported the Grand Prix itself.

21 teams entered the championship. For 2000, the FIA imposed an upper limit of 15 teams of 2 cars each, with one of the places reserved for the winning team of the 1999 Italian Formula 3000 Championship; therefore, 7 bottom-ranked teams would not have been eligible to advance to the next year, which increased the competition. Portman-Arrows team collapsed midway through the championship, and Arden's Marc Goossens was disqualified in Hungary due to illegal changes in suspension, which denied Arden its first and the only points in the championship, causing a controversy.

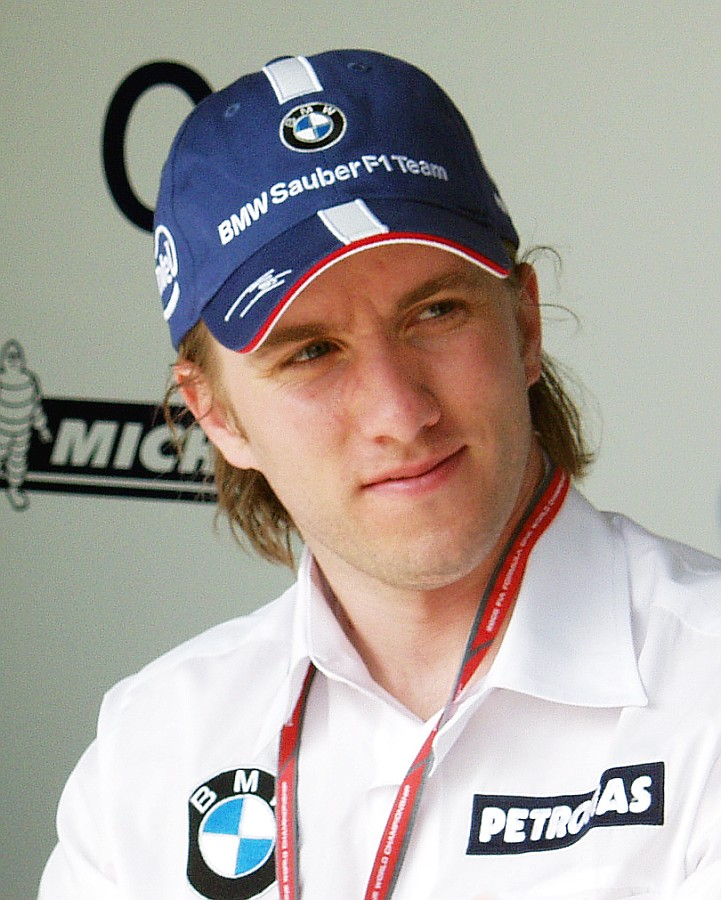
McLaren junior Nick Heidfeld (pictured in 2006), won the Drivers' Championship for West Competition who also won the Teams' Championship.

== Drivers and teams ==
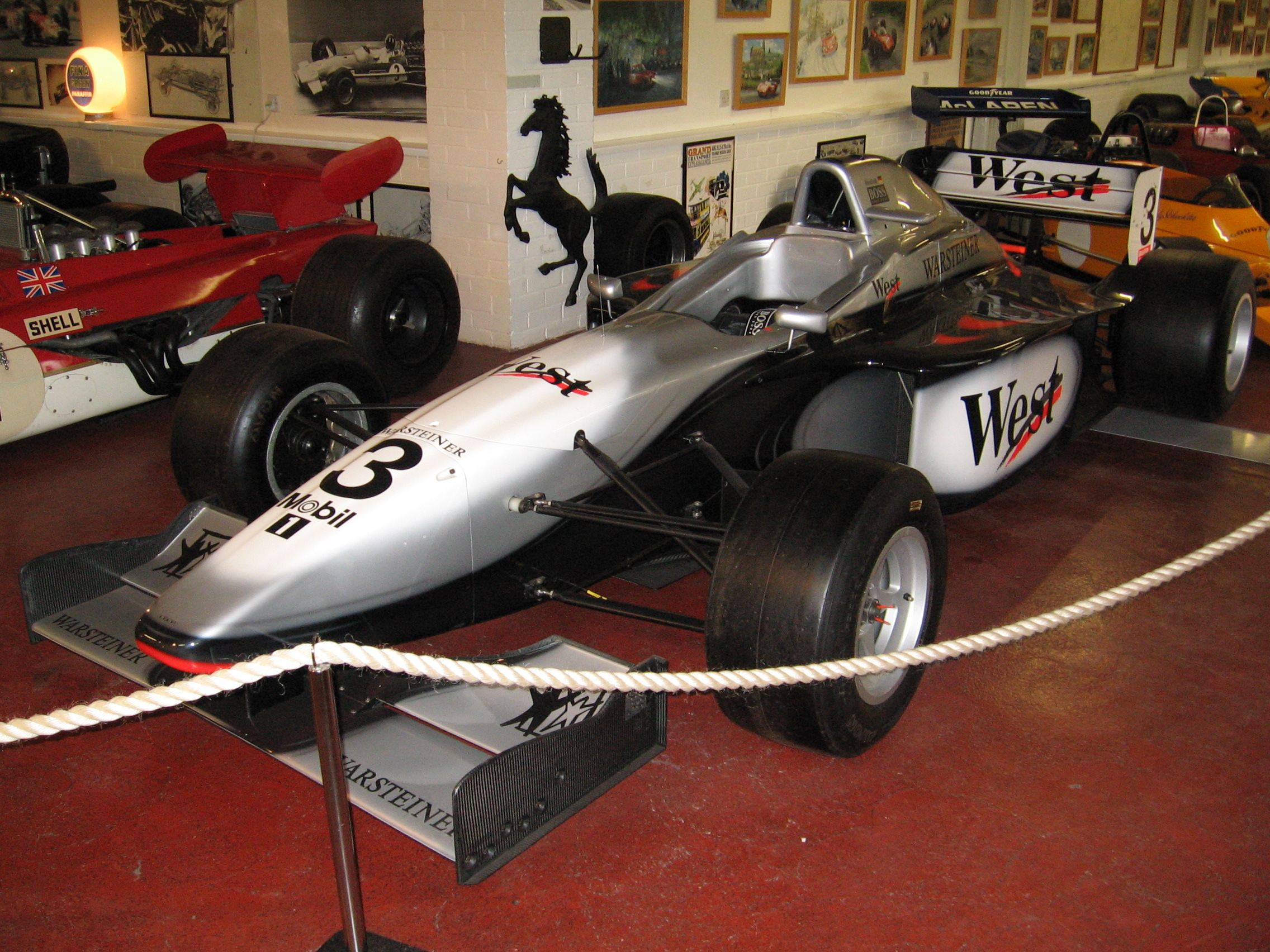
The Lola B99/50 of Drivers' Champion Nick Heidfeld.

The following drivers and teams took part in the 1999 FIA Formula 3000 International Championship. A Lola B99/50 chassis powered by a Zytek V8 engine was mandatory for all entries.

Team	No.	Driver	Rounds
(United Kingdom) Super Nova Racing	1	(Brazil) Ricardo Mauricio	1-3
(United Kingdom) Super Nova Racing	1	(Belgium) David Saelens	4-10
(United Kingdom) Super Nova Racing	2	(Denmark) Jason Watt	All
(United Kingdom) West Competition	3	(Germany) Nick Heidfeld	All
(United Kingdom) West Competition	4	(Brazil) Mario Haberfeld	All
(Brazil) Petrobras Junior Team	5	(Brazil) Max Wilson	1-8, 10
(Brazil) Petrobras Junior Team	5	(Brazil) Marcelo Battistuzzi	9
(Brazil) Petrobras Junior Team	6	(Brazil) Bruno Junqueira	All
(Belgium) Team Astromega	7	(United Kingdom) Justin Wilson	All
(Belgium) Team Astromega	8	(Uruguay) Gonzalo Rodríguez	1-9
(France) Gauloises Junior	9	(Portugal) André Couto	All
(France) Gauloises Junior	10	(France) Stéphane Sarrazin	All
(Italy) Durango	11	(Italy) Paolo Ruberti	All
(Italy) Durango	12	(Germany) Wolf Henzler	1-7
(Italy) Durango	12	(Argentina) Nicolas Filiberti	8
(Italy) Durango	12	(Italy) Giovanni Montanari	9-10
(United Kingdom) Lukoil Arden	15	(Russia) Viktor Maslov	All
(United Kingdom) Lukoil Arden	16	(Belgium) Marc Goossens	All
(United Kingdom) European Edenbridge Racing	17	(United Kingdom) Oliver Gavin	All
(United Kingdom) European Edenbridge Racing	18	(United Kingdom) Jamie Davies	All
(France) DAMS	19	(France) Franck Montagny	All
(France) DAMS	20	(France) David Terrien	All
(France) Cica Team Oreca	23	(France) Grégoire de Galzain	1-4
(France) Cica Team Oreca	23	(Germany) Alex Müller	5-8
(France) Cica Team Oreca	23	(France) Steve Hiesse	9
(France) Cica Team Oreca	23	(France) Romain Dumas	10
(France) Cica Team Oreca	24	(France) Soheil Ayari	All
(Italy) Coloni Motorsport	25	(Spain) Polo Villaamil	All
(Italy) Coloni Motorsport	26	(Germany) Norman Simon	1-7
(Italy) Coloni Motorsport	26	(Brazil) Marcelo Battistuzzi	8
(Italy) Coloni Motorsport	26	(United Kingdom) Dino Morelli	9-10
(United Kingdom) Nordic Racing	27	(Germany) Sascha Bert	1-3
(United Kingdom) Nordic Racing	27	(Germany) Arnd Meier	4-10
(United Kingdom) Nordic Racing	28	(United Kingdom) Kevin McGarrity	All
(Italy) Draco Engineering	29	(France) Fabrice Walfisch	All
(Italy) Draco Engineering	30	(Italy) Oliver Martini	1-9
(Italy) Draco Engineering	30	(France) Cyrille Sauvage	10
(Italy) GP Racing	31	(Italy) Giovanni Montanari	1-4
(Italy) GP Racing	31	(Argentina) Gastón Mazzacane	5
(Italy) GP Racing	31	(France) Laurent Delahaye	6-10
(Italy) GP Racing	32	(Italy) Fabrizio Gollin	All
(United Kingdom) Fortec Motorsport	35	(Argentina) Norberto Fontana	All
(United Kingdom) Fortec Motorsport	36	(Australia) Andrej Pavicevic	All
Monaco Motorsport	37	(Italy) Thomas Biagi	1-5
Monaco Motorsport	37	(Malaysia) Alex Yoong	6-10
Monaco Motorsport	38	(Argentina) Brian Smith	1-4
Monaco Motorsport	38	(France) Cyrille Sauvage	5-8
Monaco Motorsport	38	(Italy) Marco Apicella	9
Monaco Motorsport	38	(Brazil) Marcelo Battistuzzi	10
(Austria) Red Bull Junior/RSM Marko	39	(Brazil) Enrique Bernoldi	All
(Austria) Red Bull Junior/RSM Marko	40	(Austria) Markus Friesacher	1-3
(Austria) Red Bull Junior/RSM Marko	40	(Brazil) Ricardo Mauricio	4-10
(United Kingdom) Portman-Arrows	41	(France) Boris Derichebourg	1-3
(United Kingdom) Portman-Arrows	42	(Brazil) Marcelo Battistuzzi	1-3
(Italy) WRT Fina	43	(Czech Republic) Tomáš Enge	All
(Italy) WRT Fina	44	(Belgium) David Saelens	1-3
(Italy) WRT Fina	44	(Italy) Andrea Boldrini	4-8
(Italy) WRT Fina	44	(Germany) Norman Simon	9-10
(Belgium) Witmeur KTR	45	(Belgium) Bas Leinders	All
(Belgium) Witmeur KTR	46	(Belgium) Jeffrey van Hooydonk	All
(United Kingdom) Kid Jensen Racing	47	(France) Nicolas Minassian	All
(United Kingdom) Kid Jensen Racing	48	(Italy) Andrea Piccini	All

== Calendar ==
Starting in 1999, all International Formula 3000 were held on Formula One Grand Prix courses.

Round	Circuit	Date	Laps	Distance	Time	Speed	Pole position	Fastest lap	Winner	Winning team	Report
1	(Italy) Autodromo Enzo e Dino Ferrari	1 May	42	4.930=207.060 km	1.11:29.942	173.584 km/h	(Brazil) Max Wilson	(Germany) Nick Heidfeld	(Germany) Nick Heidfeld	(United Kingdom) West Competition	Report
2	Circuit de Monaco	15 May	50	3.367=168.350 km	1'18:22.018	128.693 km/h	(Germany) Nick Heidfeld	(France) Stéphane Sarrazin	(Uruguay) Gonzalo Rodríguez	(Belgium) Team Astromega	Report
3	(Spain) Circuit de Catalunya	29 May	44	4.728=208.032 km	1'13:16.982	170.982 km/h	(Germany) Nick Heidfeld	(Germany) Nick Heidfeld	(Germany) Nick Heidfeld	(United Kingdom) West Competition	Report
4	(France) Circuit de Nevers Magny-Cours	26 June	49	4.250=208.250 km	1'25:56.738	145.252 km/h	(Brazil) Bruno Junqueira	(France) Soheil Ayari	(Germany) Nick Heidfeld	(United Kingdom) West Competition	Report
5	(United Kingdom) Silverstone Circuit	10 July	40	5.140=205.600 km	1'07:48.722	181.622 km/h	(France) Nicolas Minassian	(Germany) Nick Heidfeld	(France) Nicolas Minassian	(United Kingdom) Kid Jensen Racing	Report
6	(Austria) A1 Ring	24 July	48	4.319=207.312 km	1'07:50.994	183.327 km/h	(Germany) Nick Heidfeld	(Germany) Nick Heidfeld	(Germany) Nick Heidfeld	(United Kingdom) West Competition	Report
7	(Germany) Hockenheimring	31 July	30	6.823=204.690 km	1'00:17.627	200.369 km/h	(Brazil) Max Wilson	(Uruguay) Gonzalo Rodríguez	(Brazil) Bruno Junqueira	(Brazil) Petrobras Junior Team	Report
8	(Hungary) Hungaroring	14 August	52	3.972=206.544 km	1'19:43.676	155.475 km/h	(France) Fabrice Walfisch	(Germany) Nick Heidfeld	(France) Stéphane Sarrazin	(France) Gauloises Junior	Report
9	(Belgium) Circuit de Spa-Francorchamps	28 August	30	6.968=209.040 km	1'13:57.599	169.571 km/h	(Denmark) Jason Watt	(Uruguay) Gonzalo Rodríguez	(Denmark) Jason Watt	(United Kingdom) Super Nova Racing	Report
10	(Germany) Nürburgring	25 September	45	4.556=205.020 km	1'09:35.500	176.763 km/h	(Germany) Nick Heidfeld	(Germany) Nick Heidfeld	(Denmark) Jason Watt	(United Kingdom) Super Nova Racing	Report

== Final points standings ==
=== Drivers' Championship ===
Pos	Driver	IMO (Italy)	MON (Monaco)	CAT (Spain)	MAG (France)	SIL (United Kingdom)	A1R (Austria)	HOC (Germany)	HUN (Hungary)	SPA (Belgium)	NUR (Germany)	Points
1	(Germany) Nick Heidfeld	1	**7**	**1**	1	3	**1**	Ret	2	4	**2**	59
2	(Denmark) Jason Watt	Ret	2	Ret	Ret	10	4	7	6	**1**	1	30
3	(Uruguay) Gonzalo Rodríguez	5	1	2	Ret	15	DNQ	4	Ret	2		27
4	(France) Stéphane Sarrazin	4	14	5	5	7	6	3	1	Ret	17	22
5	(Brazil) Bruno Junqueira	Ret	6	4	**Ret**	2	DNQ	1	15	Ret	16	20
6	(France) Nicolas Minassian	13	Ret	8	14	**1**	3	Ret	5	3	Ret	20
7	(France) Soheil Ayari	Ret	Ret	10	8	4	2	12	4	Ret	4	15
8	(Brazil) Max Wilson	**Ret**	3	DSQ	Ret	Ret	Ret	**2**	Ret		3	14
9	(Belgium) David Saelens	DNQ	DNQ	DNQ	3	9	Ret	8	DNQ	5	5	8
10	(United Kingdom) Kevin McGarrity	2	DNQ	9	Ret	23	DNQ	15	10	Ret	7	6
11	(Czech Republic) Tomáš Enge	DNQ	DNQ	14	2	17	11	Ret	14	11	Ret	6
12	(France) Franck Montagny	10	9	Ret	7	6	12	6	3	Ret	9	6
13	(Portugal) André Couto	Ret	Ret	3	Ret	DNQ	7	Ret	Ret	7	DNQ	4
14	(France) Fabrice Walfisch	3	DNQ	Ret	Ret	13	Ret	Ret	**Ret**	16	Ret	4
15	(Argentina) Norberto Fontana	Ret	5	Ret	Ret	5	8	Ret	Ret	14	10	4
16	(United Kingdom) Oliver Gavin	12	4	DNQ	DNQ	14	DNQ	DNQ	DNQ	9	8	3
17	(Belgium) Jeffrey van Hooydonk	Ret	10	11	4	19	DNQ	DNQ	Ret	DNQ	12	3
18	(Brazil) Enrique Bernoldi	9	15	Ret	12	20	Ret	5	8	DNQ	DNQ	2
19	(Italy) Andrea Piccini	Ret	Ret	DNQ	13	8	5	DNQ	Ret	DNQ	DNQ	2
20	(United Kingdom) Justin Wilson	6	Ret	6	10	Ret	Ret	Ret	7	Ret	Ret	2
21	(United Kingdom) Jamie Davies	7	13	7	DNQ	12	DNQ	9	12	12	6	1
22	(Brazil) Ricardo Mauricio	15	Ret	Ret	DNQ	DNQ	15	DNQ	9	6	Ret	1
23	(Belgium) Bas Leinders	DNQ	DNQ	Ret	6	16	Ret	Ret	Ret	DNQ	Ret	1
–	(France) David Terrien	DNQ	8	Ret	9	11	DNQ	DNQ	DNQ	8	11	0
–	(Argentina) Brian Smith	8	Ret	DNQ	DNQ							0
–	(Spain) Polo Villaamil	DNQ	DNQ	DNQ	DNQ	DNQ	9	DNQ	Ret	DNQ	DNQ	0
–	(Germany) Norman Simon	Ret	DNQ	18	DNQ	22	10	DNQ		DNQ	15	0
–	(Italy) Oliver Martini	DNQ	Ret	DNQ	DNQ	DNQ	16	10	DNQ	DNQ		0
–	(United Kingdom) Dino Morelli									10	DNQ	0
–	(Italy) Fabrizio Gollin	DNQ	11	12	11	DNQ	Ret	Ret	11	13	18	0
–	(Brazil) Marcelo Battistuzzi	11	12	DNQ					13	17	DNQ	0
–	(France) Cyrille Sauvage					DNQ	14	11	DNQ		14	0
–	(Australia) Andrej Pavicevic	DNQ	DNQ	DNQ	DNQ	21	DNQ	13	DNQ	15	13	0
–	(Germany) Wolf Henzler	Ret	DNQ	DNQ	Ret	DNQ	13	DNQ				0
–	(Italy) Paolo Ruberti	14	Ret	Ret	15	Ret	DNQ	Ret	Ret	DNQ	19	0
–	(Brazil) Mario Haberfeld	DNQ	DNQ	Ret	Ret	18	Ret	14	DNQ	DNQ	DNQ	0
–	(Belgium) Marc Goossens	DNQ	DNQ	Ret	Ret	DNQ	Ret	Ret	DSQ	Ret	DNQ	0
–	(Malaysia) Alex Yoong						DNQ	DNQ	DNQ	Ret	Ret	0
–	(France) Boris Derichebourg	Ret	Ret	DNQ								0
–	(Italy) Andrea Boldrini				DNQ	DNQ	Ret	DNQ	DNQ			0
–	(France) Laurent Delahaye						DNQ	DNQ	DNQ	DNS	DNQ	0
–	(Russia) Viktor Maslov	DNQ	DNQ	DNQ	DNQ	DNQ	DNQ	DNQ	DNQ	DNQ	DNQ	0
–	(Germany) Arnd Meier				DNQ	DNQ	DNQ	DNQ	DNQ	DNQ	DNQ	0
–	(Italy) Giovanni Montanari	DNQ	DNQ	DNQ	DNQ					DNQ	DNQ	0
–	(Italy) Thomas Biagi	DNQ	DNQ	DNQ	DNQ	DNQ						0
–	(France) Grégoire de Galzain	DNQ	DNQ	DNQ	DNQ							0
–	(Germany) Alex Müller					DNQ	DNQ	DNQ	DNQ			0
–	(Germany) Sascha Bert	DNQ	DNQ	DNQ								0
–	(Austria) Markus Friesacher	DNQ	DNQ	DNQ								0
–	(Argentina) Gastón Mazzacane					DNQ						0
–	(Argentina) Nicolas Filiberti								DNQ			0
–	(France) Steve Hiesse									DNQ		0
–	(Italy) Marco Apicella									DNQ		0
–	(France) Romain Dumas										DNQ	0
Pos	Driver	IMO (Italy)	MON (Monaco)	CAT (Spain)	MAG (France)	SIL (United Kingdom)	A1R (Austria)	HOC (Germany)	HUN (Hungary)	SPA (Belgium)	NUR (Germany)	Points

Colour	Result
Gold	Winner
Silver	Second place
Bronze	Third place
Green	Points classification
Blue	Non-points classification
Blue	Non-classified finish (NC)
Purple	Retired, not classified (Ret)
Red	Did not qualify (DNQ)
Red	Did not pre-qualify (DNPQ)
Black	Disqualified (DSQ)
White	Did not start (DNS)
White	Withdrew (WD)
White	Race cancelled (C)
Blank	Did not practice (DNP)
Blank	Did not arrive (DNA)
Blank	Excluded (EX)

**Bold** – Pole
Italics – Fastest lap

=== Notes ===
- All drivers used Lola B99/50 chassis, with Zytek V8 engines, and Avon tyres.
- Marc Goossens was disqualified from the Hungarian round of the championship due to an illegal suspension damper.

== Complete overview ==
first column of every race	10	= qualifying result

second column of every race	10	= race result

R=retired NC=not classified NS=did not start NQ=did not qualify NT=no time set in qualifying DIS(3)=disqualified after finishing in third place DIS=disqualified in practice

Place	Name	Team	IMO (Italy)		MON (Monaco)		CAT (Spain)		MAG (France)		SIL (United Kingdom)		OST (Austria)		HOC (Germany)		HUN (Hungary)		SPA (Belgium)		NÜR (Germany)
1	(Germany) Nick Heidfeld	West Competition Team	3	1	1	7	1	1	2	1	3	3	1	1	5	R	3	2	10	4	1	2
2	(Denmark) Jason Watt	SuperNova Racing	6	R	4	2	20	R	3	R	14	10	6	4	10	7	12	6	1	1	2	1
3	(Uruguay) Gonzalo Rodríguez	Team Astromega	8	5	2	1	2	2	17	R	16	15	30	NQ	4	4	4	R	9	2	-	-
4	(France) Stéphane Sarrazin	Gauloises Formula	10	4	8	14	6	5	7	5	6	7	26	6	6	3	2	1	5	R	6	17
5	(Brazil) Bruno Junqueira	Petrobras Junior Team	4	R	14	6	16	4	1	R	2	2	38	NQ	2	1	18	15	3	R	4	16
	(France) Nicolas Minassian	Kid Jensen Racing	15	13	3	16	21	8	8	14	1	1	7	3	19	R	11	5	4	3	22	R
7	(France) Soheil Ayari	Cica Team Oreca	14	R	10	R	4	10	9	8	4	4	4	2	8	12	8	4	7	R	7	4
8	(Brazil) Max Wilson	Petrobras Junior Team	1	R	7	3	3	DIS(13)	6	R	9	R	17	R	1	2	21	R	-	-	3	3
9	(Belgium) David Saelens	WRT FINA Racing	29	NQ	28	NQ	31	NQ
9	(Belgium) David Saelens	SuperNova Racing							12	3	11	9	21	R	17	8	29	NQ	8	5	8	5
10	(United Kingdom) Kevin McGarrity	Nordic Racing	2	2	30	NQ	22	9	15	R	18	23	34	NQ	12	15	14	10	23	R	11	7
	(Czech Republic) Tomáš Enge	WRT FINA Racing	28	NQ	29	NQ	25	13	4	2	19	17	9	11	21	R	17	14	18	11	10	R
	(France) Franck Montagny	DAMS	17	10	21	9	7	R	18	7	7	6	3	12	3	6	7	3	6	R	16	9
13	(France) Fabrice Walfisch	Draco	9	3	31	NQ	23	16	20	R	15	13	23	R	11	R	1	R	2	16	20	R
	(Portugal) André Couto	Gauloises Formula	7	R	5	NS	13	3	24	17	33	NQ	25	7	15	R	5	R	14	7	DIS	-
	(Argentina) Norberto Fontana	Fortec Motorsport	5	R	19	5	9	14	14	R	5	5	5	8	9	16	19	R	22	14	12	10
16	(United Kingdom) Oliver Gavin	European Edenbridge Racing	21	12	11	4	29	NQ	28	NQ	21	14	27	NQ	31	NQ	27	NQ	12	9	14	8
	(Belgium) Jeffrey van Hooydonk	Witmeur Team KTR	22	R	16	10	10	11	11	4	12	19	36	NQ	29	NQ	10	16	35	NQ	13	12
18	(United Kingdom) Justin Wilson	Team Astromega	11	6	13	R	5	6	26	10	23	R	11	17	23	R	9	7	20	R	5	R
	(Italy) Andrea Piccini	Kid Jensen Racing	12	R	24	R	30	NQ	23	13	8	8	14	5	27	NQ	16	R	27	NQ	34	NQ
	(Brazil) Enrique Bernoldi	Red Bull Junior/RSM Marko	19	9	23	15	15	15	10	12	25	20	13	R	7	5	15	8	28	NQ	NT	-
21	(Belgium) Bas Leinders	Witmeur Team KTR	30	NQ	17	NS	19	R	16	6	13	16	15	R	13	R	25	R	34	NQ	18	R
	(Brazil) Ricardo Mauricio	SuperNova Racing	25	15	25	R	17	R
	(Brazil) Ricardo Mauricio	Red Bull Junior/RSM Marko							33	NQ	34	NQ	12	15	35	NQ	22	9	11	6	21	20
	(United Kingdom) Jamie Davies	European Edenbridge Racing	20	7	12	13	12	7	37	NQ	10	12	40	NQ	16	9	26	12	19	12	9	6
-	(France) David Terrien	DAMS	32	NQ	18	8	14	R	19	9	20	11	28	NQ	30	NQ	30	NQ	25	8	19	11
-	(Argentina) Brian Smith	Monaco Motorsport	16	8	20	R	39	NQ	35	NQ	-	-	-	-	-	-	-	-	-	-	-	-
-	(Spain) Polo Villaamil	Coloni Motorsport	33	NQ	37	NQ	27	NQ	32	NQ	37	NQ	19	9	33	NQ	23	R	32	NQ	27	NQ
-	(Germany) Norman Simon	Coloni Motorsport	26	R	34	NQ	26	R	29	NQ	24	22	24	10	32	NQ	-	-
-	(Germany) Norman Simon	WRT FINA Racing																	29	NQ	15	15
-	(Italy) Oliver Martini	Draco	35	NQ	6	R	35	NQ	27	NQ	36	NQ	16	16	22	10	32	NQ	31	NQ	-	-
-	(United Kingdom) Dino Morelli	Coloni Motorsport	-	-	-	-	-	-	-	-	-	-	-	-	-	-	-	-	15	10	28	NQ
-	(Italy) Fabrizio Gollin	GP Racing	27	NQ	22	11	24	12	21	11	28	NQ	10	R	20	R	24	11	17	13	23	18
-	(Brazil) Marcelo Battistuzzi	Portman-Arrows Racing	18	11	26	12	28	NQ	-	-	-	-	-	-	-	-
-	(Brazil) Marcelo Battistuzzi	Coloni Motorsport															20	13
-	(Brazil) Marcelo Battistuzzi	Petrobras Junior Team																	24	17	-	-
-	(France) Cyrille Sauvage	Monaco Motorsport	-	-	-	-	-	-	-	-	40	NQ	22	14	24	11	28	NQ	-	-
-	(France) Cyrille Sauvage	Draco																			26	14
-	(Australia) Andrej Pavicevic	Fortec Motorsport	42	NQ	36	NQ	38	NQ	31	NQ	26	21	32	NQ	26	13	40	NQ	21	15	17	13
-	(Germany) Wolf Henzler	Durango Formula	24	R	32	NQ	33	NQ	25	R	32	NQ	2	13	28	NQ	-	-	-	-	-	-
-	(Italy) Paolo Ruberti	Durango Formula	13	14	9	R	11	R	22	15	17	R	29	NQ	25	R	13	R	36	NQ	24	19
-	(Brazil) Mario Haberfeld	West Competition Team	36	NQ	41	NQ	8	R	13	R	22	18	8	R	18	14	36	NQ	33	NQ	32	NQ
-	(Belgium) Marc Goossens	Lukoil Arden Racing	37	NQ	38	NQ	18	R	5	16	30	NQ	20	R	14	R	6	DIS(3)	13	R	30	NQ
-	(Malaysia) Alex Yoong	Monaco Motorsport	-	-	-	-	-	-	-	-	-	-	37	NQ	38	NQ	39	NQ	16	R	25	R
-	(France) Boris Derichebourg	Portman-Arrows Racing	23	R	15	R	34	NQ	-	-	-	-	-	-	-	-	-	-	-	-	-	-
-	(Italy) Andrea Boldrini	WRT FINA Racing	-	-	-	-	-	-	39	NQ	38	NQ	18	9	34	NQ	34	NQ	-	-	-	-
-	(France) Laurent Delahaye	GP Racing	-	-	-	-	-	-	-	-	-	-	39	NQ	39	NQ	33	NQ	26	R	31	NQ
-	(Russia) Viktor Maslov	Lukoil Arden Racing	39	NQ	39	NQ	41	NQ	38	NQ	39	NQ	35	NQ	40	NQ	35	NQ	30	NQ	35	NQ
-	(Germany) Arnd Meier	Nordic Racing	-	-	-	-	-	-	40	NQ	27	NQ	33	NQ	37	NQ	37	NQ	40	NQ	29	NQ
-	(Italy) Giovanni Montanari	GP Racing	31	NQ	27	NQ	36	NQ	36	NQ	-	-	-	-	-	-	-	-
-	(Italy) Giovanni Montanari	Durango Formula																	37	NQ	36	NQ
-	(Italy) Thomas Biagi	Monaco Motorsport	34	NQ	33	NQ	37	NQ	34	NQ	35	NQ	-	-	-	-	-	-	-	-	-	-
-	(France) Grégoire de Galzain	Cica Team Oreca	38	NQ	35	NQ	32	NQ	30	NQ	-	-	-	-	-	-	-	-	-	-	-	-
-	(Germany) Alex Müller	Cica Team Oreca	-	-	-	-	-	-	-	-	29	NQ	31	NQ	36	NQ	31	NQ	-	-	-	-
-	(Germany) Sascha Bert	Nordic Racing	40	NQ	NT	-	40	NQ	-	-	-	-	-	-	-	-	-	-	-	-	-	-
-	(Austria) Markus Friesacher	Red Bull Junior/RSM Marko	41	NQ	40	NQ	42	NQ	-	-	-	-	-	-	-	-	-	-	-	-	-	-
-	(Argentina) Gastón Mazzacane	GP Racing	-	-	-	-	-	-	-	-	31	NQ	-	-	-	-	-	-	-	-	-	-
-	(Argentina) Nicolas Filiberti	Durango Formula	-	-	-	-	-	-	-	-	-	-	-	-	-	-	38	NQ	-	-	-	-
-	(France) Steve Hiesse	Cica Team Oreca	-	-	-	-	-	-	-	-	-	-	-	-	-	-	-	-	38	NQ	-	-
-	(Italy) Marco Apicella	Monaco Motorsport	-	-	-	-	-	-	-	-	-	-	-	-	-	-	-	-	39	NQ	-	-
-	(France) Romain Dumas	Cica Team Oreca	-	-	-	-	-	-	-	-	-	-	-	-	-	-	-	-	-	-	33	NQ

== See also ==
- 1999 Italian Formula 3000 season
