= Nicolás Filiberti =

Argentine racing driver

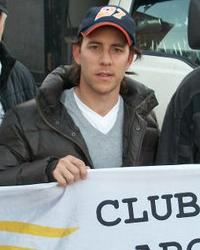
Nicolás Filiberti in 2010

Nicolás Filiberti (born April 11, 1977 in Buenos Aires) is an Argentine former racing driver.

Filiberti began his career in Formula Honda Argentina in 1994. He then went on to South American Formula Three.

In 1998, Filiberti traveled to Europe to compete in the Euro Open by Nissan with EC Motorsport, where he finished eighth with a victory. The following year, he competed in Italian Formula 3000 with Durango Formula and participated in a round of the International F3000, although he failed to qualify.

In 2000, Filiberti finished ninth in the SportsRacing World Cup alongside Giovanni Lavaggi. The following year, he returned to the International F3000 and Open by Nissan, race partially in both.

Filiberti's last year in Europe was 2002, before returning to Argentina. In his country, he raced TC 2000 in those first two years and then moved on to Top Race V6, where he remained active until his retirement in 2011. That year he also participated in three Porsche Supercup races.

== Racing record ==
=== Complete International Formula 3000 results ===
(key) (Races in bold indicate pole position) (Races in italics indicate fastest lap)

Year	Entrant	1	2	3	4	5	6	7	8	9	10	11	12	DC	Points
1999	Durango	IMO	MON	CAT	MAG	SIL	A1R	HOC	HUN; DNQ	SPA	NÜR			NC	0
2001	F3000 Prost Junior Team	INT; 20	IMO; 17	CAT; 14	A1R; 10	MON	NÜR	MAG	SIL	HOC	HUN	SPA	MNZ	27th	0

=== Complete Porsche Supercup results ===
(key) (Races in bold indicate pole position) (Races in italics indicate fastest lap)

Año	Team	1	2	3	4	5	6	7	8	9	10	11	DC	Points
2011	Sanitec Aquiles MRS Team	IST; 13	CAT; 15	MON; 18	NNS	SIL	NÜR	HUN	SPA	MNZ	YMC	YMC	19th	5
