= Stéphane Sarrazin =

French racing and rally driver (born 1975)

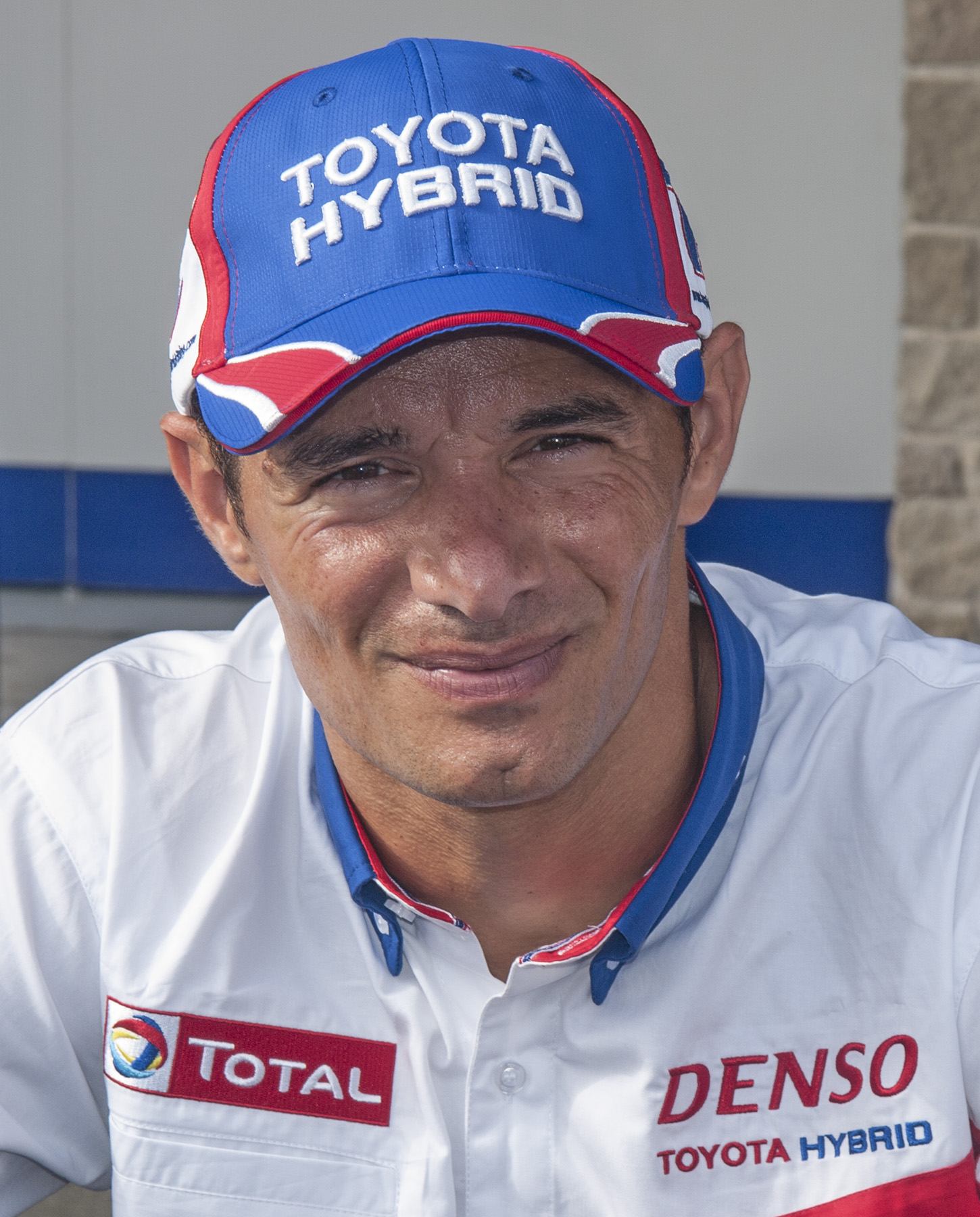
- Sarrazin at the 2014 Lone Star Le Mans
- Nationality: (France) French
- Born: Stéphane Jean-Marc Sarrazin; 2 November 1975 (age 51) Barjac, Gard, France

WEC – LMP1 career
- Debut season: 2012
- Current team: SMP Racing
- Categorisation: FIA Platinum
- Former teams: Toyota Gazoo Racing
- Starts: 51
- Championships: 0
- Wins: 3
- Poles: 3
- Fastest laps: 0
- Best finish: 3rd in 2013, 2016

Previous series
- 2013–14 2013 2012 2012 2011 2011–12 2010 2009–2011 2007–08, 2010–11 2005–06, 2008–11 2005, 2008–09 2003 2003 1998–2001 1995–97 1993–94: European Rally Championship; Rolex Sports Car Series; WEC – LMP2; European Le Mans Series; Intercontinental Le Mans Cup; V8 Supercars; FIA GT1 World Championship; Intercontinental Rally Challenge; Le Mans Series; American Le Mans Series; FIA GT Championship; World Series by Nissan; FIA Sportscar Championship; International Formula 3000; French Formula Three; French Formula Renault

Championship titles
- 2007, 2010 1994: Le Mans Series; French Formula Renault

Formula E career
- Debut season: 2014–15
- Current team: MS&AD Andretti Formula E
- Car number: 27
- Former teams: Venturi Grand Prix, Techeetah
- Starts: 37
- Championships: 0
- Wins: 0
- Poles: 1
- Fastest laps: 0
- Best finish: 6th in 2015–16

Formula One World Championship career
- Active years: 1999
- Team: Minardi
- Entries: 1
- Championships: 0
- Wins: 0
- Podiums: 0
- Career points: 0
- Pole positions: 0
- Fastest laps: 0
- First entry: 1999 Brazilian Grand Prix

24 Hours of Le Mans career
- Years: 2001–2003, 2005–
- Teams: Viper Team Oreca, Pescarolo Sport, Aston Martin Racing, Peugeot, Toyota Racing
- Best finish: 2nd (2007, 2009, 2013, 2016)
- Class wins: 0

World Rally Championship record
- Years active: 2004–2006, 2015–2020, 2022
- Co-driver: (France) Patrick Pivato (France) Denis Giraudet (Belgium) Stéphane Prévot (France) Jacques-Julien Renucci (France) Kévin Parent
- Teams: Equipe de France FFSA, Subaru, First Motorsport
- Rallies: 23
- Championships: 0
- Rally wins: 0
- Podiums: 0
- Stage wins: 1
- Total points: 26
- First rally: 2004 Rallye Deutschland

Stéphane Jean-Marc Sarrazin (born 2 November 1975) is a French racing and rally driver. He has won races across a number of single-seater, sportscar and rallying disciplines and competitions, was French Formula Renault champion in 1994, and Le Mans Series champion in both 2007 and 2010.

Although he has never won the 24 Hours of Le Mans race, Sarrazin has finished on the podium six times, including four outright second positions. He participated in one Formula One Grand Prix, the 1999 Brazilian Grand Prix, for Minardi as a replacement for Luca Badoer, who had injured his wrist. He suffered a big spin in the race coming up to the start-finish straight on lap 31 and scored no championship points. He also carried out testing duties for the Prost Grand Prix team during the 1999–2001 Formula One seasons and for Toyota Racing in their first season in 2002.

== Career ==
During the 1999 season, Sarrazin raced in International Formula 3000, winning one race at the Hungaroring. In 2003, he raced in the Superfund World Series.

In 2004, Sarrazin converted to rallying and competed in two World Rally Championship events, posting a best result of fourth. He was signed to drive Subaru's second car along with young Australian Chris Atkinson as a teammate to defending world champion Petter Solberg. He also competed at the 2004 Race of Champions.

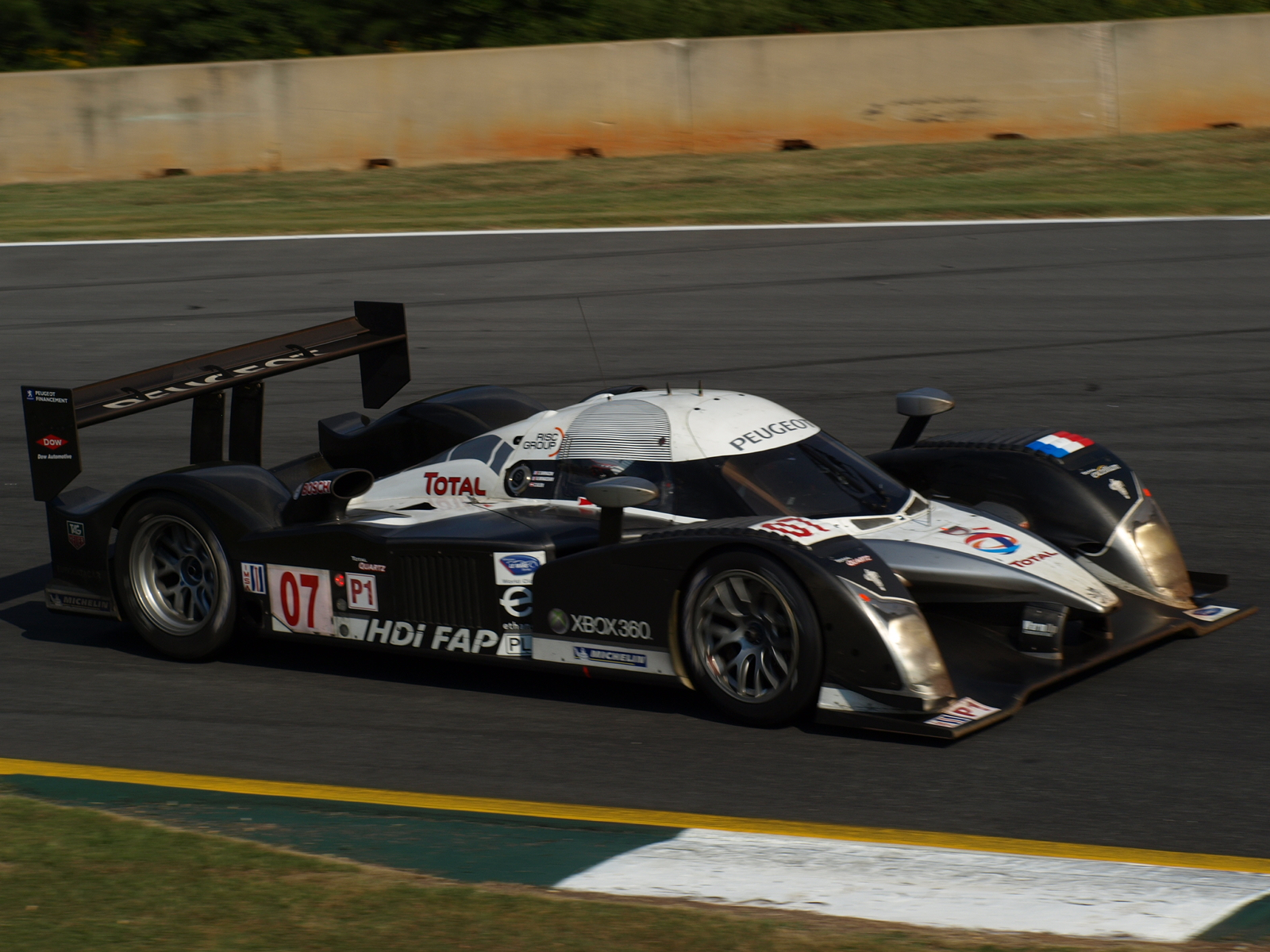
Sarrazin driving the Peugeot 908 HDi FAP at the 2008 Petit Le Mans.

Sarrazin drove an Aston Martin DBR9 in the GT1 class of the 2006 American Le Mans Series, but was announced on 10 January 2007 as an official works driver for Peugeot Sport in the Le Mans Series, driving the new 908 HDi FAP diesel Le Mans Prototype. He won the 2007 Le Mans Series with Pedro Lamy, by winning three races. Sarrazin also took pole position at the 2007 24 Hours of Le Mans and finished second in the race with Lamy and Sébastien Bourdais. He won the 2008 24 Hours of Spa driving the Vitaphone Racing Team Maserati MC12. He finished third in the 2009 Monte Carlo rally. Sarrazin finished second again in the 2009 24 Hours of Le Mans. He finished fourth overall on the Monte Carlo round of the 2010 Intercontinental Rally Challenge.

Following Peugeot's withdrawal from endurance racing, Sarrazin signed with Starworks Motorsport for the 2012 FIA World Endurance Championship. Sarrazin also signed a temporary deal to drive the Toyota TS030 Hybrid at Le Mans due to the withdrawal of Hiroaki Ishiura on medical grounds.

In 2013, Sarrazin joined Toyota Racing full-time as a driver of the Toyota TS030. Sarrazin helped the team finish second at Le Mans and scored his first win with the team in Bahrain.

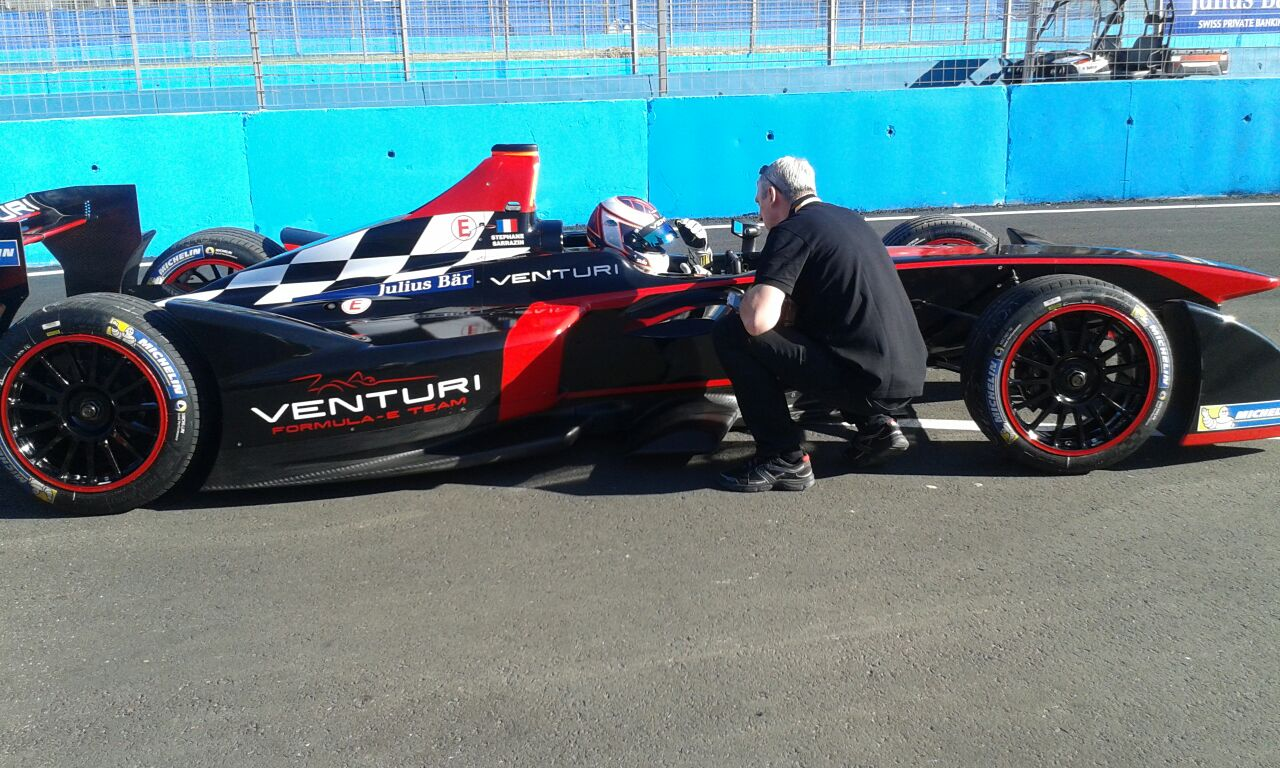
Sarrazin at the 2014 Punta del Este ePrix.

Sarrazin continued with Toyota Racing in 2014, and signed for Venturi Grand Prix to race in Formula E. He finished the first ever race of the series, the 2014 Beijing ePrix in ninth place. Two months later in November 2014, he took his first international rally victory in the Tour de Corse, which was the last rally of the 2014 European Rally Championship.

In 2021, Sarrazin entered the inaugural season of the Extreme E all-electric off-road racing series for Veloce Racing. During the 2021 Island X-Prix, he suffered a massive rollover, but he came out unscathed, though he went to the medical centre for precautionary checks.

== Racing record ==
=== Career summary ===
Season	Series	Team	Races	Wins	Poles	F/laps	Podiums	Points	Position
1993	Championnat de France Formule Renault	La Filière	11	0	0	1	2	63	5th
1994	Championnat de France Formule Renault	La Filière	12	5	3	3	10	135	1st
1995	French Formula 3 Championship	La Filière	11	0	1	1	0	34	8th
1996	French Formula 3 Championship	Winfield	10	0	0	0	2	46	9th
1997	French Formula 3 Championship	LD Autosport	15	3	2	3	9	141	2nd
1997	Macau Grand Prix	LD Autosport	1	0	0	0	0	N/A	7th
1997	Masters of Formula 3	Opel Team BSR	1	0	0	0	0	N/A	15th
1998	International Formula 3000	Apomatox	12	1	1	0	2	19	6th
1999	International Formula 3000	Gauloises Junior	10	1	0	1	2	22	4th
1999	Formula One	Prost Grand Prix	Test driver						
1999	Formula One	Minardi	1	0	0	0	0	0	NC
2000	International Formula 3000	MySap.com	6	0	0	2	0	3	22nd
2000	Formula One	Prost Grand Prix	Test driver						
2001	International Formula 3000	Prost Junior Team	1	0	0	0	1	4	14th
2001	24 Hours of Le Mans – LMP900	Viper Team Oreca	1	0	0	0	0	N/A	NC
2002	24 Hours of Le Mans – LMP900	PlayStation Team Oreca	1	0	0	0	0	N/A	5th
2003	World Series by Nissan	Racing Engineering	18	1	2	4	5	110	7th
2003	FIA Sportscar Championship – SR1	Pescarolo Sport	2	1	0	0	2	24	6th
2003	24 Hours of Le Mans – LMP900	Pescarolo Sport	1	0	0	0	0	N/A	6th
2003	1000 km of Le Mans – LMP900	Pescarolo Sport	1	0	0	0	1	N/A	2nd
2004	World Rally Championship	Equipe de France FFSA	3	0	—N/a		0	8	11th
2005	FIA GT Championship – GT1	Aston Martin Racing	1	0	0	0	0	0	NC
2005	American Le Mans Series – GT1	Aston Martin Racing	1	0	0	0	0	9	16th
2005	24 Hours of Le Mans – GT1	Aston Martin Racing	1	0	0	0	1	N/A	3rd
2005	World Rally Championship	Subaru World Rally Team	8	0	—N/a		0	6	17th
2006	American Le Mans Series – GT1	Aston Martin Racing	10	3	2	1	6	163	2nd
2006	24 Hours of Le Mans – GT1	Aston Martin Racing	1	0	0	0	0	N/A	5th
2006	World Rally Championship	Subaru World Rally Team	4	0	—N/a		0	6	18th
2007	Le Mans Series	Peugeot Total	6	3	1	?	5	40	1st
2007	24 Hours of Le Mans	Peugeot Total	1	0	1	0	1	N/A	2nd
2008	FIA GT Championship – GT1	Vitaphone Racing	1	1	0	0	1	20	9th
2008	Le Mans Series	Peugeot Total	5	2	2	?	2	21	4th
2008	American Le Mans Series	Peugeot Total	2	0	0	0	1	46	7th
2008	24 Hours of Le Mans	Peugeot Total	1	0	1	0	0	N/A	5th
2009	FIA GT Championship – GT1	Vitaphone Racing	1	0	0	0	0	5	17th
2009	American Le Mans Series	Peugeot Total	2	1	0	0	2	56	5th
2009	24 Hours of Le Mans	Peugeot Total	1	0	1	0	1	N/A	2nd
2009	Intercontinental Rally Challenge	Peugeot Total	1	0	—N/a		1	6	14th
2010	Le Mans Series	Peugeot Total	5	1	0	0	3	78	1st
2010	American Le Mans Series – LMP	Peugeot Total	1	1	0	0	1	0	NC
2010	24 Hours of Le Mans	Peugeot Total	1	0	0	0	0	N/A	NC
2010	FIA GT1 World Championship	Hexis AMR	2	0	0	0	0	2	41st
2010	Intercontinental Rally Challenge	Stéphane Sarrazin	2	0	—N/a		0	5	20th
2011	Le Mans Series	Peugeot Total	3	0	0	0	2	0	NC
2011	American Le Mans Series	Peugeot Total	2	1	1	0	2	0	NC
2011	Intercontinental Le Mans Cup	Peugeot Total	7	1	1	0	6	N/A	NC
2011	24 Hours of Le Mans	Peugeot Total	1	0	0	0	1	N/A	3rd
2011	International V8 Supercars Championship	Brad Jones Racing	2	0	0	0	0	42	81st
2011	Intercontinental Rally Challenge	Stéphane Sarrazin	1	0	—N/a		0	12	18th
2012	FIA World Endurance Championship	Starworks Motorsport	8	0	0	1	0	37.5	15th
2012	FIA World Endurance Championship	Toyota Racing	1	0	0	0	0	37.5	15th
2012	24 Hours of Le Mans	Toyota Racing	1	0	0	0	0	N/A	DNF
2012	European Le Mans Series	Sébastien Loeb Racing	2	0	0	0	1	30	6th
2012	International V8 Supercars Championship	Brad Jones Racing	2	0	0	0	0	0	NC
2013	FIA World Endurance Championship	Toyota Racing	8	1	0	0	4	106.25	3rd
2013	24 Hours of Le Mans	Toyota Racing	1	0	0	0	1	N/A	2nd
2013	Rolex Sports Car Series	8 Star Motorsports	11	0	0	0	1	249	13th
2013	European Rally Championship	First Motorsport	1	0	—N/a		1	24	19th
2014	FIA World Endurance Championship	Toyota Racing	8	1	2	0	5	116	5th
2014	24 Hours of Le Mans	Toyota Racing	1	0	0	0	0	N/A	NC
2014	European Rally Championship	First Motorsport	1	1	—N/a		1	39	14th
2014–15	Formula E	Venturi Grand Prix	11	0	1	0	0	22	14th
2015	FIA World Endurance Championship	Toyota Racing	8	0	0	0	1	79	6th
2015	24 Hours of Le Mans	Toyota Racing	1	0	0	0	0	N/A	6th
2015	World Rally Championship	First Motorsport	1	0	—N/a		0	2	26th
2015–16	Formula E	Venturi Grand Prix	10	0	0	0	1	70	6th
2016	FIA World Endurance Championship	Toyota Gazoo Racing	9	1	0	0	6	145	**3rd**
2016	24 Hours of Le Mans	Toyota Gazoo Racing	1	0	0	0	1	N/A	2nd
2016	World Rally Championship	Stéphane Sarrazin	1	0	—N/a		0	0	NC
2016–17	Formula E	Venturi Grand Prix	6	0	0	0	0	36	10th
2016–17	Formula E	Techeetah	6	0	0	0	2	36	10th
2017	FIA World Endurance Championship	Toyota Gazoo Racing	3	0	1	0	1	26	17th
2017	24 Hours of Le Mans	Toyota Gazoo Racing	1	0	1	0	0	N/A	DNF
2017	WeatherTech SportsCar Championship	Rebellion Racing	1	0	0	0	0	23	33rd
2017	World Rally Championship	Stéphane Sarrazin	1	0	—N/a		0	2	21st
2017–18	Formula E	MS&AD Andretti Formula E	4	0	0	0	0	0	22nd
2018	World Rally Championship	Stéphane Sarrazin	1	0	—N/a		0	0	NC
2018	24 Hours of Le Mans	SMP Racing	1	0	0	0	0	N/A	DNF
2018–19	FIA World Endurance Championship	SMP Racing	8	0	0	0	1	27	14th
2019	World Rally Championship	Stéphane Sarrazin	2	0	—N/a		0	2	23rd
2019	24 Hours of Le Mans	SMP Racing	1	0	0	0	0	N/A	DNF
2020	World Rally Championship	Stéphane Sarrazin	1	0	—N/a		0	0	NC
2020	World Rally Championship-3	Stéphane Sarrazin	1	0	—N/a		0	0	NC
2021	Extreme E	Veloce Racing	3	0	0	0	1	60	7th

=== Single-seater racing ===
==== Complete International Formula 3000 results ====
(key) (Races in bold indicate pole position; races in italics indicate fastest lap)

Year	Entrant	1	2	3	4	5	6	7	8	9	10	11	12	DC	Points
1998	Apomatox	OSC; 1	IMO; 24	CAT; 15	SIL; 24	MON; 4	PAU; Ret	A1R; 8	HOC; Ret	**HUN**; 2	SPA; Ret	PER; Ret	NÜR; 19	6th	19
1999	Gauloises Junior	IMO; 4	MON; 14	CAT; 5	MAG; 5	SIL; 7	A1R; 6	HOC; 3	HUN; 1	SPA; Ret	NÜR; 17			4th	22
2000	MySap.com	IMO; 7	SIL; 19	CAT; 9	NÜR; 5	MON; Ret	MAG; 6	A1R	HOC	HUN	SPA			22nd	3
2001	F3000 Prost Junior Team	INT	IMO	CAT	A1R	MON; 3	NÜR	MAG	SIL	HOC	HUN	SPA	MNZ	14th	4

==== Complete Formula One results ====
(key)

Year	Entrant	Chassis	Engine	1	2	3	4	5	6	7	8	9	10	11	12	13	14	15	16	WDC	Points
1999	Fondmetal Minardi Ford	Minardi M01	Ford VJM1 Zetec-R 3.0 V10	AUS	BRA; Ret	SMR	MON	ESP	CAN	FRA	GBR	AUT	GER	HUN	BEL	ITA	EUR	MAL	JPN	NC	0

==== Complete Formula E results ====
(key) (Races in bold indicate pole position; races in italics indicate fastest lap)

Year	Team	Chassis	Powertrain	1	2	3	4	5	6	7	8	9	10	11	12	Pos	Points
2014–15	Venturi Formula E Team	Spark SRT01-e	SRT01-e	BEI; 9	PUT; 12	PDE; Ret	BUE; 10	MIA; Ret	LBH; 10	MCO; 7	BER; 6	MSC; 14	LDN; 10	**LDN**; 15		14th	22
2015–16	Venturi Formula E Team	Spark SRT01-e	Venturi VM200-FE-01	BEI; 9	PUT; 4	PDE; 9	BUE; 4	MEX; 9	LBH; 2	PAR; 5	BER; 10	LDN; 10	LDN; 5			6th	70
2016–17	Venturi Formula E Team	Spark SRT01-e	Venturi VM200-FE-02	HKG; 10	MRK; 12	BUE; 12	MEX; 15	MCO; 15†	PAR; 10							10th	36
2016–17	Techeetah	Spark SRT01-e	Renault Z.E. 16							BER; 11	BER; 14	NYC; 3	NYC; 12†	MTL; 3	MTL; 8	10th	36
2017–18	MS&AD Andretti Formula E	Spark SRT01-e	Andretti ATEC-03	HKG	HKG	MRK	SCL	MEX	PDE	RME	PAR	BER; 20	ZUR; 14	NYC; 12	NYC; 12	22nd	0

=== Sportscar racing ===
==== 24 Hours of Le Mans results ====
Year	Team	Co-drivers	Car	Class	Laps	Pos.	Class pos.
2001	(France) Viper Team Oreca	(France) Yannick Dalmas (France) Franck Montagny	Chrysler LMP	LMP900	126	DNF	DNF
2002	(France) PlayStation Team Oreca	(France) Franck Montagny (France) Nicolas Minassian	Dallara SP1-Judd	LMP900	359	6th	5th
2003	(France) Pescarolo Sport	(France) Jean-Christophe Boullion (France) Franck Lagorce	Courage C60-Peugeot	LMP900	356	8th	6th
2005	(United Kingdom) Aston Martin Racing	(Australia) David Brabham (United Kingdom) Darren Turner	Aston Martin DBR9	GT1	333	9th	**3rd**
2006	(United Kingdom) Aston Martin Racing	(Portugal) Pedro Lamy (Monaco) Stéphane Ortelli	Aston Martin DBR9	GT1	342	10th	5th
2007	(France) Team Peugeot Total	(Portugal) Pedro Lamy (France) Sébastien Bourdais	Peugeot 908 HDi FAP	LMP1	359	**2nd**	**2nd**
2008	(France) Team Peugeot Total	(Portugal) Pedro Lamy (Austria) Alexander Wurz	Peugeot 908 HDi FAP	LMP1	368	5th	5th
2009	(France) Team Peugeot Total	(France) Franck Montagny (France) Sébastien Bourdais	Peugeot 908 HDi FAP	LMP1	381	**2nd**	**2nd**
2010	(France) Team Peugeot Total	(France) Franck Montagny (France) Nicolas Minassian	Peugeot 908 HDi FAP	LMP1	264	DNF	DNF
2011	(France) Peugeot Sport Total	(France) Franck Montagny (France) Nicolas Minassian	Peugeot 908	LMP1	353	**3rd**	**3rd**
2012	(Japan) Toyota Racing	(United Kingdom) Anthony Davidson (Switzerland) Sébastien Buemi	Toyota TS030 Hybrid	LMP1	82	DNF	DNF
2013	(Japan) Toyota Racing	(United Kingdom) Anthony Davidson (Switzerland) Sébastien Buemi	Toyota TS030 Hybrid	LMP1	347	**2nd**	**2nd**
2014	(Japan) Toyota Racing	(Austria) Alexander Wurz (Japan) Kazuki Nakajima	Toyota TS040 Hybrid	LMP1-H	219	DNF	DNF
2015	(Japan) Toyota Racing	(United Kingdom) Mike Conway (Austria) Alexander Wurz	Toyota TS040 Hybrid	LMP1	387	6th	6th
2016	(Japan) Toyota Gazoo Racing	(United Kingdom) Mike Conway (Japan) Kamui Kobayashi	Toyota TS050 Hybrid	LMP1	381	**2nd**	**2nd**
2017	(Japan) Toyota Gazoo Racing	(United Kingdom) Mike Conway (Japan) Kamui Kobayashi	Toyota TS050 Hybrid	LMP1	154	DNF	DNF
2018	(Russia) SMP Racing	(Russia) Matevos Isaakyan (Russia) Egor Orudzhev	BR Engineering BR1-AER	LMP1	123	DNF	DNF
2019	(Russia) SMP Racing	(Russia) Sergey Sirotkin (Russia) Egor Orudzhev	BR Engineering BR1-AER	LMP1	163	DNF	DNF

==== Complete Le Mans Series results ====
Year	Entrant	Class	Chassis	Engine	1	2	3	4	5	6	Rank	Points
2007	Team Peugeot Total	LMP1	Peugeot 908 HDi FAP	Peugeot 5.5L Turbo V12 (Diesel)	MON; 3	VAL; 1	NÜR; 1	SPA; 1	SIL; NC	**MIL**; 2	1st	40
2008	Team Peugeot Total	LMP1	Peugeot 908 HDi FAP	Peugeot 5.5L Turbo V12 (Diesel)	**CAT**; 8	MON; 1	**SPA**; Ret	NÜR; 1	**SIL**; 11		7th	21
2010	Team Oreca Matmut	LMP1	Peugeot 908 HDi FAP	Peugeot 5.5L Turbo V12 (Diesel)	CAS; 4	SPA; 2	ALG; 1	HUN; 4	SIL; 2		1st	78
2011	Peugeot Sport Total	LMP1	Peugeot 908	Peugeot HDI 3.7 L Turbo V8 (Diesel)	CAS	SPA; 2	IMO; 2	SIL; 8	EST		NC	0

==== Complete FIA World Endurance Championship results ====
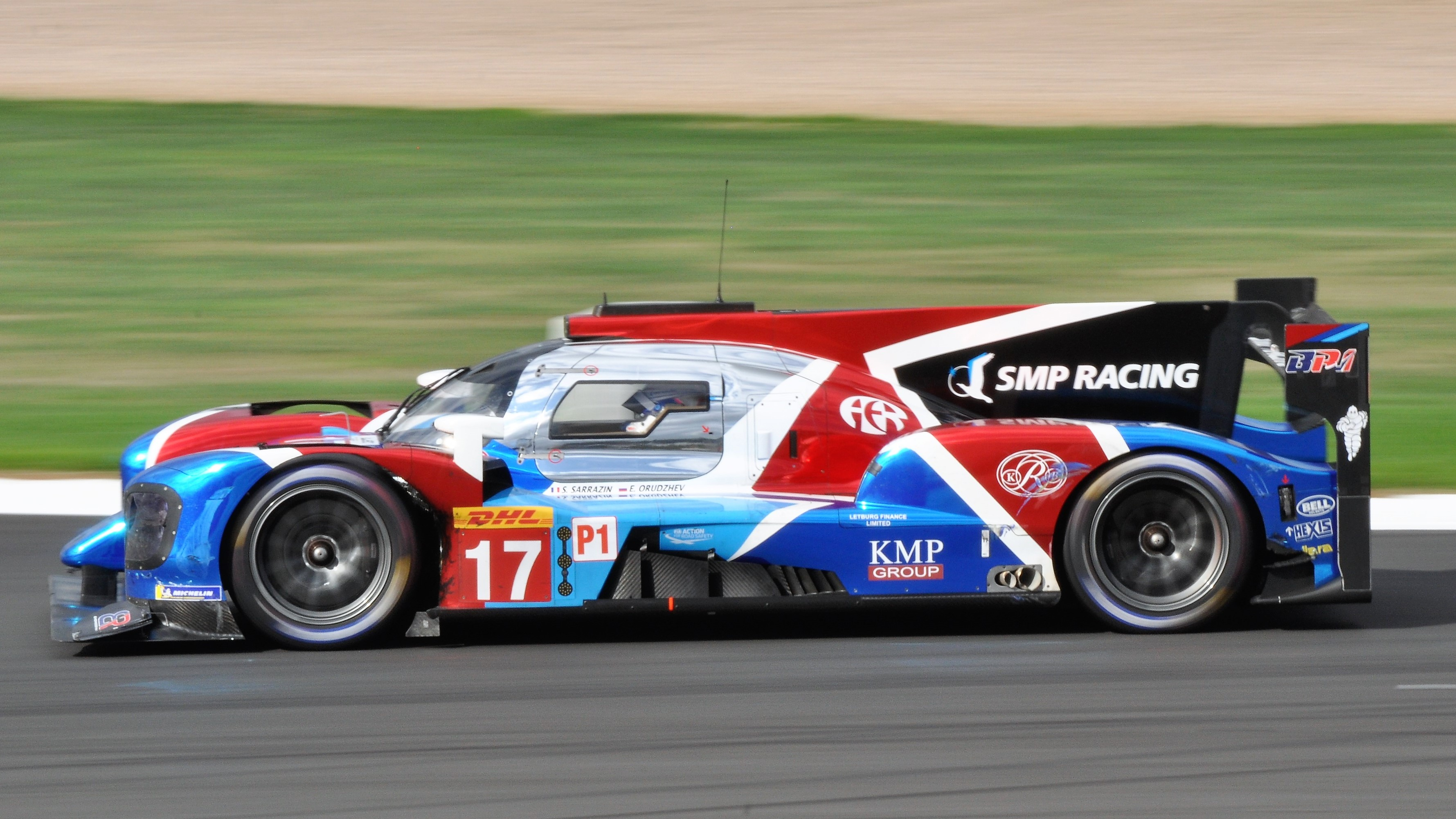
Sarrazin driving for SMP Racing at Silverstone in 2018

Year	Entrant	Class	Chassis	Engine	1	2	3	4	5	6	7	8	9	Pos	Points
2012	Starworks Motorsport	LMP2	HPD ARX-03b	Honda HR28TT 2.8 L Turbo V6	SEB; 3	SPA; 29		SIL; 9	SÃO; 7	BHR; 8	FUJ; 9	SHA; 8		15th	37.5
2012	Toyota Racing	LMP1	Toyota TS030 Hybrid	Toyota 3.4 L V8 (Hybrid)			LMS; Ret							15th	37.5
2013	Toyota Racing	LMP1	Toyota TS030 Hybrid	Toyota 3.4 L V8 (Hybrid)	SIL; 3	SPA; 4	LMS; 2	SÃO; Ret	COA; 2	FUJ; 15	SHA; Ret	BHR; 1		3rd	106.25
2014	Toyota Racing	LMP1	Toyota TS040 Hybrid	Toyota 3.7 L V8 (Hybrid)	**SIL**; 2	SPA; 3	**LMS**; Ret	COA; 6	FUJ; 2	SHA; 2	BHR; 1	SÃO; 4		5th	116
2015	Toyota Racing	LMP1	Toyota TS040 Hybrid	Toyota 3.7 L V8 (Hybrid)	SIL; 4	SPA; 5	LMS; 6	NÜR; 6	COA; Ret	FUJ; 6	SHA; 5	BHR; 3		6th	79
2016	Toyota Gazoo Racing	LMP1	Toyota TS050 Hybrid	Toyota 2.4 L Turbo V6 (Hybrid)	SIL; 2	SPA; Ret	LMS; 2	NÜR; 6	MEX; 3	COA; 3	FUJ; 1	SHA; 2	BHR; 5	3rd	145
2017	Toyota Gazoo Racing	LMP1	Toyota TS050 Hybrid	Toyota 2.4 L Turbo V6 (Hybrid)	SIL	SPA; 5	**LMS**; Ret	NÜR	MEX	COA; 3	FUJ	SHA	BHR	17th	26
2018–19	SMP Racing	LMP1	BR Engineering BR1	AER P60B 2.4 L Turbo V6	SPA; Ret	LMS; Ret	SIL; 3	FUJ; Ret	SHA; Ret	SEB; NC	SPA; 4	LMS; Ret		14th	27

=== Rallying ===
==== WRC results ====
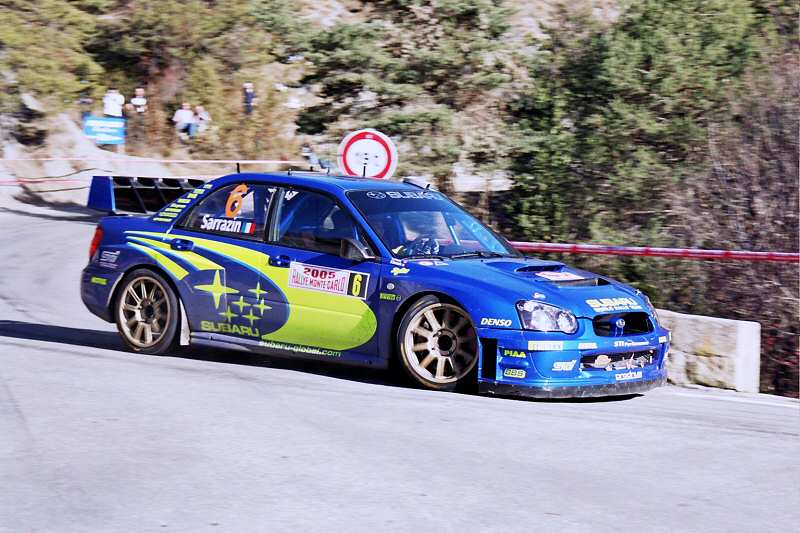
Sarrazin driving a Subaru Impreza WRC on the 2005 Monte Carlo Rally.

Year	Entrant	Car	1	2	3	4	5	6	7	8	9	10	11	12	13	14	15	16	WDC	Points
2004	Equipe de France FFSA	Subaru Impreza WRC2003	MON	SWE	MEX	NZL	CYP	GRE	TUR	ARG	FIN	GER; 9	JPN	GBR	ITA	FRA; 6	ESP; 4	AUS	11th	8
2005	Subaru World Rally Team	Subaru Impreza WRC2004	MON; 14	SWE; 13															17th	6
2005	Subaru World Rally Team	Subaru Impreza WRC2005			MEX	NZL	ITA; 12	CYP	TUR	GRE; 13	ARG	FIN	GER; 8	GBR; Ret	JPN	FRA; 4	ESP; Ret	AUS	17th	6
2006	Subaru World Rally Team	Subaru Impreza WRC2006	MON; 5	SWE	MEX	ESP; 8	FRA; 8	ARG	ITA	GRE	GER; Ret	FIN	JPN	CYP	TUR	AUS	NZL	GBR	18th	6
2015	First Motorsport	Ford Fiesta RS WRC	MON	SWE	MEX	ARG	POR	ITA	POL	FIN	GER	AUS	FRA; 9	ESP	GBR				26th	2
2016	Stéphane Sarrazin	Hyundai i20 R5	MON	SWE	MEX	ARG	POR	ITA	POL	FIN	GER	CHN; C	FRA; Ret	ESP	GBR	AUS			NC	0
2017	Stéphane Sarrazin	Škoda Fabia R5	MON	SWE	MEX	FRA; 9	ARG	POR	ITA	POL	FIN	GER	ESP	GBR	AUS				21st	2
2018	Stéphane Sarrazin	Hyundai i20 R5	MON; Ret	SWE	MEX	FRA	ARG	POR	ITA	FIN	GER	TUR	GBR	ESP	AUS				NC	0
2019	Stéphane Sarrazin	Hyundai i20 R5	MON; 9	SWE	MEX	FRA	ARG	CHL	POR	ITA	FIN	GER; Ret	TUR	GBR	ESP	AUS; C			23rd	2
2020	Stéphane Sarrazin	Hyundai i20 R5	MON; Ret	SWE	MEX	EST	TUR	ITA	MNZ										NC	0
2022	Stéphane Sarrazin	Volkswagen Polo GTI R5	MON	SWE	CRO	POR	ITA	KEN	EST	FIN	BEL	GRE	NZL	ESP; Ret	JPN				NC	0

==== WRC-3 results ====
Year	Entrant	Car	1	2	3	4	5	6	7	Pos.	Points
2020	Stéphane Sarrazin	Hyundai i20 R5	MON; Ret	SWE	MEX	EST	TUR	ITA	MNZ	NC	0

==== IRC results ====
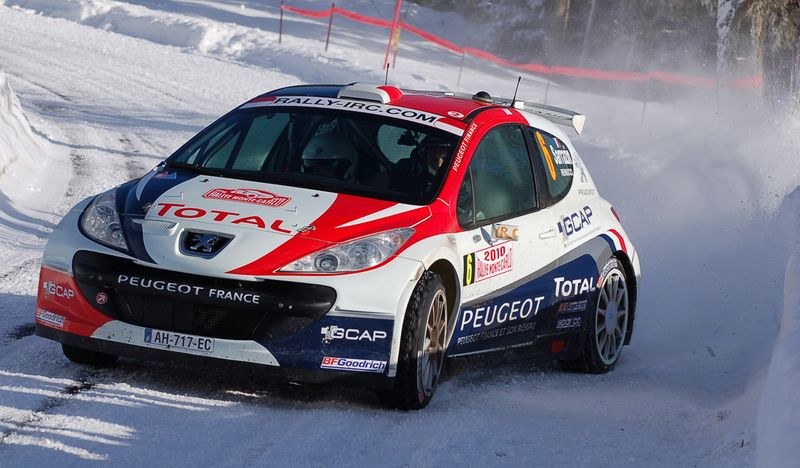
Sarrazin driving a Peugeot 207 S2000 on the 2010 Monte Carlo Rally.

Year	Entrant	Car	1	2	3	4	5	6	7	8	9	10	11	12	WDC	Points
2009	Peugeot Total	Peugeot 207 S2000	MON; 3	BRA	KEN	POR	BEL	RUS	POR	CZE	ESP	ITA	SCO		14th	6
2010	Stéphane Sarrazin	Peugeot 207 S2000	MON; 4	BRA	ARG	CAN	ITA	BEL; Ret	AZO	MAD	CZE	ITA	SCO	CYP	20th	5
2011	Stéphane Sarrazin	Peugeot 207 S2000	MON; 4	CAN	COR	YAL	YPR	AZO	ZLI	MEC	SAN	SCO	CYP		18th	12

==== Complete European Rally Championship results ====
Year	Entrant	Car	1	2	3	4	5	6	7	8	9	10	11	12	Pos.	Points
2013	First Motorsport	Mini John Cooper Works S2000	JÄN	LIE	CAN	AZO	COR; 3	YPR	ROM	ZLÍ	POL	CRO	SAN	VAL	19th	24
2014	First Motorsport	Ford Fiesta RRC	JÄN	LIE	ROM	ACR	IRE	AZO	YPR	EST	CZE	CYP	VAL	COR; 1	14th	39

=== Touring car racing ===
==== Complete V8 Supercar results ====
Year	Team	No.	Car	1	2	3	4	5	6	7	8	9	10	11	12	13	14	15	16	17	18	19	20	21	22	23	24	25	26	27	28	29	30	31	Final pos	Points
2011	Brad Jones Racing	8	Holden VE Commodore	YMC; R1	YMC; R2	ADE; R3	ADE; R4	HAM; R5	HAM; R6	BAR; R7	BAR; R8	BAR; R9	WIN; R10	WIN; R11	HID; R12	HID; R13	TOW; R14	TOW; R15	QLD; R16	QLD; R17	QLD; R18	PHI; Q	PHI; R19	BAT; R20	SUR; R21; 21	SUR; R22; Ret	SYM; R23	SYM; R24	SAN; R25	SAN; R26	SYD; R27	SYD; R28			81st	42
2012	Brad Jones Racing	8	Holden VE Commodore	ADE; R1	ADE; R2	SYM; R3	SYM; R4	HAM; R5	HAM; R6	BAR; R7	BAR; R8	BAR; R9	PHI; R10	PHI; R11	HID; R12	HID; R13	TOW; R14	TOW; R15	QLD; R16	QLD; R17	SMP; R18	SMP; R19	SAN; Q	SAN; R20	BAT; R21	SUR; R22; 12	SUR; R23; Ret	YMC; R24	YMC; R25	YMC; R26	WIN; R27	WIN; R28	SYD; R29	SYD; R30	NC	0 †

† Not Eligible for points

=== Off-road racing ===
==== Complete Extreme E results ====
(key)

Year	Team	Car	1	2	3	4	5	6	7	8	9	10	Pos.	Points
2021	Veloce Racing	Spark ODYSSEY 21	DES; Q 9	DES; R WD	OCE; Q 5	OCE; R 2	ARC; Q 5	ARC; R 6	ISL; Q 8	ISL; R 8	JUR; Q	JUR; R	7th	60

Sporting positions
Preceded by David Dussau	Championnat de France Formule Renault; Champion; 1994	Succeeded by Cyrille Sauvage
Preceded by Jean-Christophe Boullion; Emmanuel Collard	Le Mans Series; Champion; 2007; With: Pedro Lamy	Succeeded by Alexandre Prémat; Mike Rockenfeller
Preceded by Tomáš Enge; Stefan Mücke; Jan Charouz	Le Mans Series; Champion; 2010	Succeeded by Emmanuel Collard; Julien Jousse
