= West Competition =

British auto racing team

(United Kingdom) West Competition
- Founded: 1998
- Folded: 2000
- Team principal(s): David Brown
- Former series: Formula 3000
- Teams' Championships: 1999 Formula 3000
- Drivers' Championships: 1999 Formula 3000 (Heidfeld)

West Competition (known as mySAP.com in 2000) was a team in the FIA Formula 3000 Championship, run by the McLaren Formula One team as part of their driver development programme. Named after McLaren's then sponsor, West, the team was active for the three seasons between 1998 and 2000, earning numerous wins as well as the 1999 drivers' and teams' title with Nick Heidfeld.

The overhaul of the Formula 3000 series in 1996 attracted a number of Formula 1 teams wishing to establish junior teams. The level of commitment to the series varied - some teams simply lent their name to an existing F3000 team, while others were factory-run programmes that ran parallel to their parent team's F1 activities. West Competition fell firmly into the latter category, run by former Williams race engineer David Brown, who had joined McLaren at the end of 1995 to become race engineer for David Coulthard. His work with the McLaren's F1 team lasted only a year, when he was placed in charge of the organisation's driver development programme.

West Competition's cars were given a silver-grey livery that was near-identical to that of the McLaren F1 cars; this remained largely the same for the period of the team's existence, even when West were replaced as title sponsor by mySAP.com.

Many of the team went on to have further success within McLaren, as well as other motor racing and the automotive industry.

== Racing History ==
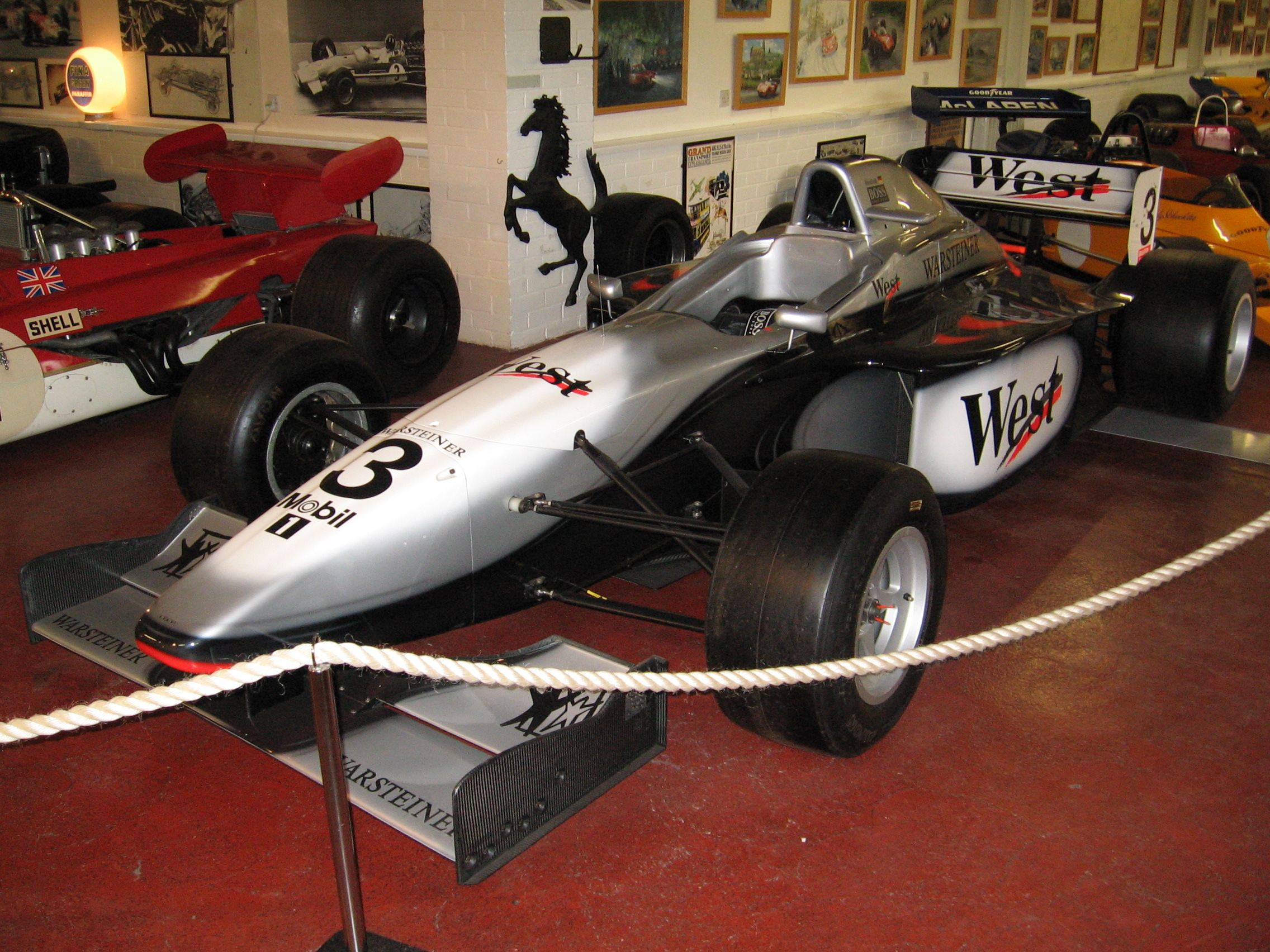
Nick Heidfeld Lola F3000, West Competition.

=== 1998 ===
The team began racing in 1998, with then McLaren test-driver Nick Heidfeld and Nicolas Minassian driving.

Heidfeld was quickly on the pace, qualifying and finishing second on his first outing. Over the season, he would win three races, qualify on pole for one more and challenge Juan Pablo Montoya for the title. He eventually finished second overall, scoring 58 points to Montoya's 65.

By contrast, Minassian had a poor season, scoring just 5 points all year. He was replaced by Bas Leinders for the final race at the Nürburgring. Even though Leinders had qualified 19th, he did not take the start of the race in order to give Heidfeld a chance at winning the title after being pushed down the grid for fuel irregularities.

=== 1999 ===
West Competition retained Nick Heidfeld for 1999 and brought in Brazilian Mario Haberfeld to replace Minassian, who had moved to the new Kid Jensen Racing team.

Heidfeld won at winning at Imola, Catalunya, Magny-Cours and the A1-Ring, as well as taking four pole positions on the way to the title. His domination of the series was reflected on his winning margin to championship runner-up Jason Watt, with Heidfeld amassing 59 points to Watt's 30.

Haberfeld fared less well, just as Minassian had before him. His season would see him fail to qualify five times and retire a further three times. On the two occasions he did finish, it was well out of the points, meaning that he finished the season without a classification in the championship.

=== 2000 ===
With champion Heidfeld leaving for the Prost F1 team at the end of his title year, West Competition signed Stéphane Sarrazin and Tomáš Enge for the 2000 season. The team also changed their name to mySAP.com in deference to their new title sponsor.

Lauded when signed, Sarazzin proved to be somewhat disappointing, scoring three points. He was replaced mid season by Tomas Scheckter, the son of the 1979 Formula 1 World Champion Jody Scheckter.

Scheckter had a mixed half-season, qualifying and finishing second behind Enge at Hockenheim, but being rather average elsewhere.

Enge had an up-and-down season, winning the race at Hockenheim yet failing to qualify at Monaco. He finished 6th in the title race, the highest of the team's drivers.

At the end of the year, the team disbanded. Principal David Brown also left McLaren at this time, opting to return to race engineering with the Jordan team.

== Complete results ==
Year	Chassis	Engine	Tyres	Drivers	1	2	3	4	5	6	7	8	9	10	11	12	DC	Points	TC
1998	Lola T96/50	Zytek V8	A		OSC	IMO	CAT	SIL	MON	PAU	A1R	HOC	HUN	SPA	PER	NÜR			—N/a
1998	Lola T96/50	Zytek V8	A	(Germany) Nick Heidfeld	2	4	26	2	1	3	7	1	1	4	2	9	2nd	58	—N/a
1998	Lola T96/50	Zytek V8	A	(France) Nicolas Minassian	Ret	19	Ret	7	9	7	5	Ret	4	19	19		13th	5	—N/a
1998	Lola T96/50	Zytek V8	A	(Belgium) Bas Leinders												DNS	NC	0	—N/a
1999	Lola B99/50	Zytek V8	A		IMO	MON	CAT	MAG	SIL	A1R	HOC	HUN	SPA	NUR					—N/a
1999	Lola B99/50	Zytek V8	A	(Germany) Nick Heidfeld	1	7	1	1	3	1	Ret	2	4	2			1st	59	—N/a
1999	Lola B99/50	Zytek V8	A	(Brazil) Mário Haberfeld	DNQ	DNQ	Ret	Ret	18	Ret	14	DNQ	DNQ	DNQ			NC	0	—N/a
2000	Lola B99/50	Zytek V8	A		IMO	SIL	CAT	NUR	MON	MAG	A1R	HOC	HUN	SPA					3rd
2000	Lola B99/50	Zytek V8	A	(France) Stéphane Sarrazin	7	19	9	5	Ret	6							22nd	3	3rd
2000	Lola B99/50	Zytek V8	A	(South Africa) Tomas Scheckter							18	2	21	DNS			13th	6	3rd
2000	Lola B99/50	Zytek V8	A	(Czech Republic) Tomáš Enge	5	13	Ret	Ret	DNQ	5	16	1	17	6			6th	15	3rd
