= Tomáš Enge =

Czech racing driver (born 1976)

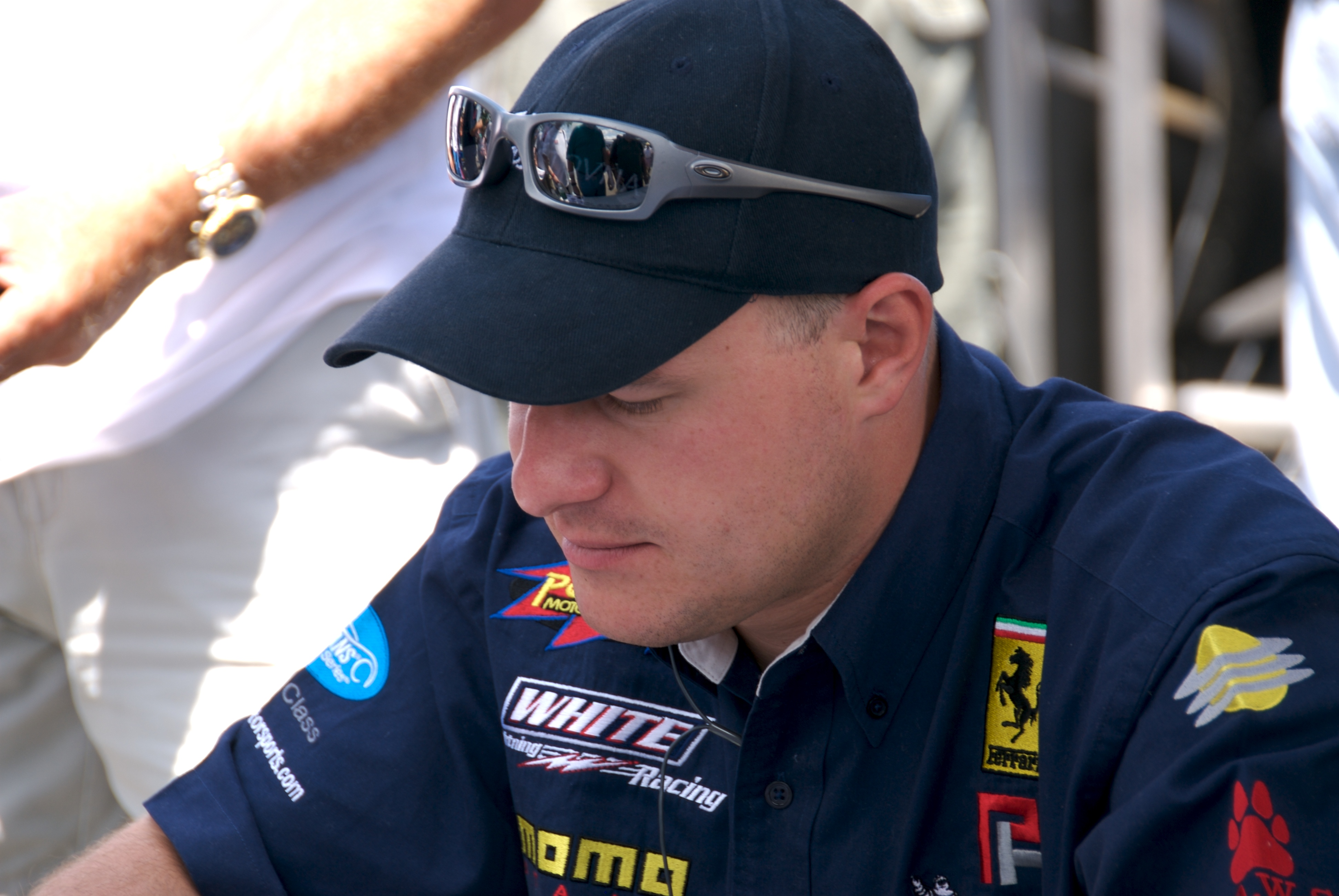
- Enge in 2007
- Born: 11 September 1976 (age 50) Liberec, Czechoslovakia
- Categorisation: FIA Platinum (until 2023); FIA Gold (2024–)

Formula One World Championship career
- Nationality: (Czech Republic) Czech
- Active years: 2001
- Team: Prost
- Entries: 3
- Championships: 0
- Wins: 0
- Podiums: 0
- Career points: 0
- Pole positions: 0
- Fastest laps: 0
- First entry: 2001 Italian Grand Prix
- Last entry: 2001 Japanese Grand Prix

24 Hours of Le Mans career
- Years: 2002–2010
- Teams: Prodrive, Aston Martin Racing, Young Driver AMR
- Best finish: 4th (2009)
- Class wins: 1 (2003) (LMGTS)

Tomáš Enge (Czech pronunciation: [ˈtomaːʃ ˈɛŋɡɛ]; born 11 September 1976) is a Czech former professional racing driver who has competed in many classes of motorsport, including three races in Formula One and nine appearances at the 24 Hours of Le Mans.

== Career ==
Born in Liberec, Enge started his career at the age of sixteen, entering a Ford Fiesta he bought with his own money in the Czechoslovak Ford Fiesta Cup.

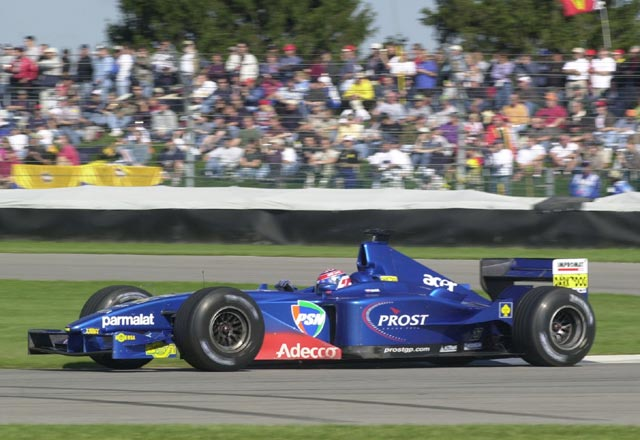
Enge driving for Prost at the 2001 United States Grand Prix.

Enge participated in the final three races of the 2001 Formula One season, becoming the first, and to date only, driver from the Czech Republic to compete in Formula One; and also the first Formula One driver from Eastern Europe. He made his debut at the Italian Grand Prix on 16 September, after being brought in by cash-strapped Prost as a replacement for Luciano Burti, who was recovering from his crash at the previous race in Belgium. Enge left the Prost Grand Prix team before it folded for the 2002 season.

Enge achieved six poles at the 24 Hours of Le Mans but only one class win, in 2003 with Prodrive.

Enge obtained his Formula One break using the sponsorship from the local Coca-Cola subsidiary, which had also funded the Nordic Racing F3000 team he raced for that year. He finished third in the 2001 standings despite missing the final race, and was stripped of the 2002 title due to a positive marijuana test. He returned to Formula 3000 in 2004, and then headed to America for 2005, driving for Panther Racing in the IRL, with modest success, although almost winning the race at Sonoma. Among his seventeen career IRL starts was his rookie start in the 2005 Indianapolis 500. He then drove for Team Czech Republic in the 2005-2006 A1GP season. Enge has also been a frequent driver for Prodrive's sportscar teams, driving both their Ferrari 550 Maranello and Aston Martin DBR9 in the 24 Hours of Le Mans. In 2006, he was driver of the No. 007 Aston Martin Racing entry in the American Le Mans Series, but for 2007, switched to the Petersen/White Lightning Ferrari F430.

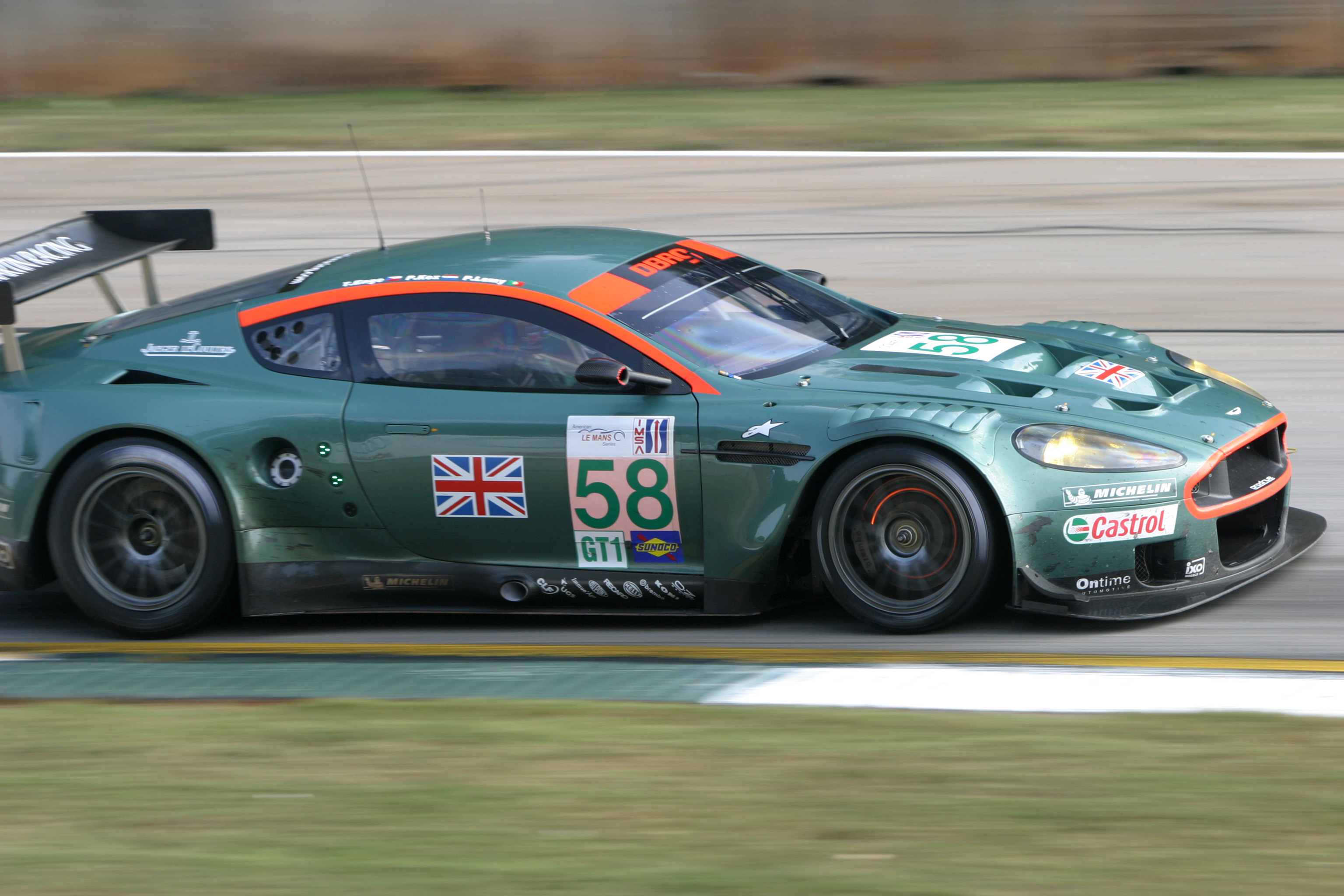
The Aston Martin DBR9 of Enge in 2005.

On 31 March 2007, Enge was injured whilst driving his F430 at the ALMS St. Petersburg race. The car crashed whilst leading the GT2 class, suffering heavy damage to the driver's side and a brief fire. Enge was removed under medical supervision and transported to the local medical centre. He was later revealed to have suffered a shattered elbow, cracked ribs, a partially collapsed lung and a potentially broken ankle, but not to be in any serious danger. On 21 July 2007, Enge was released from his contract with Petersen/White Lightning due to a penalty incurred after crashing into Mika Salo during the ALMS race at the Mid-Ohio Sports Car Course.

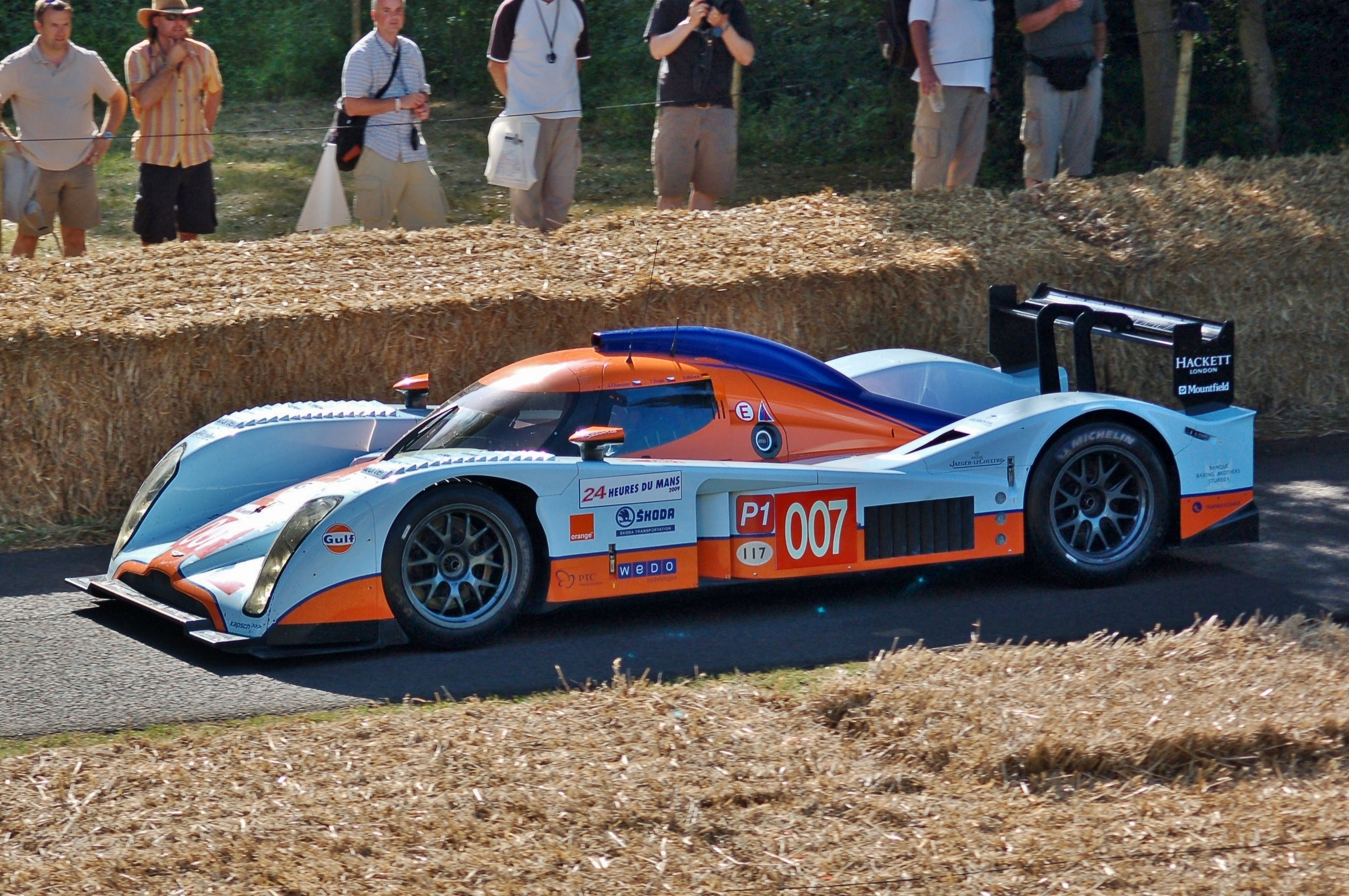
Enge was Le Mans Series champion in 2009 with Aston Martin's LMP1.

In 2009, Enge drove for Aston Martin Racing in LMP1 in the Le Mans Series and won the championship alongside Stefan Mücke and Jan Charouz. He remained with Aston Martin, as he moved into the FIA GT1 World Championship for the 2010 season, joining Darren Turner at Young Driver AMR. The pairing finished fourth in the championship with three victories. Enge and Turner were split for the 2011 season; Turner was joined by Stefan Mücke, while Enge was partnered by Alex Müller. Enge and Müller achieved two victories as they finished fourth in the championship.

With Young Driver AMR pulling out of the championship to focus on other series, Enge moved to the Reiter Engineering Lamborghini squad for the 2012 season, where he partnered socialite Albert von Thurn und Taxis. The pairing were lying tenth in the championship after four rounds; their best result was a second-place finish at the Slovakia Ring. On 19 June 2012, it was announced that Enge had tested positive for a banned substance at the Navarra round of the championship, and was suspended from racing for 18 months. Enge appealed the decision on the grounds that the positive test was caused by medication he is taking for a chronic cardiovascular condition. In April 2013, the Court of Arbitration for Sport rejected Enge's appeal.

Despite his suspension, Reiter Engineering retained Enge as a test and development driver for its Chevrolet Camaro GT3, Lamborghini Gallardo R-EX, and KTM X-Bow GT4 programmes. Enge returned to competition in the 2014 ADAC GT Masters, and continued racing sporadically until 2019, while working for Reiter as sporting director.

In 2020, Enge pivoted his focus to off-road rally raids, signing with Buggyra to compete in cross-country rallying. In January 2021, Enge made his debut in the Dakar Rally, held in Saudi Arabia, competing in the Lightweight Prototype (T3) category driving a Can-Am DV21 chassis. Despite dealing with mechanical setbacks, he finished tenth in class.

Enge is also active in sim racing, and is the founder and team principal of Tomáš Enge SIM Racing.

== Racing record ==
=== Complete German Formula Three Championship results ===
(key) (Races in bold indicate pole position)

Year	Team	Chassis	Engine	Class	1	2	3	4	5	6	7	8	9	10	11	12	13	14	15	16	17	18	19	20	DC	Points
1997	Opel Team BSR	Dallara F397	Opel	A	HOC; 1; 7	HOC; 2 Ret	NÜR1; 1; 10	NÜR1; 2; 13	SAC; 1; 6	SAC; 2; 14†	NOR; 1; 14	NOR; 2 Ret	WUN; 1; 10	WUN; 2; 7	ZWE; 1; 9	ZWE; 2 Ret	SAL; 1 Ret	SAL; 2; 7	**LAH**; **1**; 18†	LAH; 2; 9	NÜR2; 1; 6	NÜR2; 2; 12			12th	30
1998	Opel Team BSR	Martini MK73	Opel	A	HOC; 1; 14	HOC; 2 DNS	NÜR1; 1; 12	NÜR1; 2; 9	SAC; 1	SAC; 2	NOR; 1 Ret	NOR; 2; 11	LAH; 1; 10	LAH; 2; 12	WUN; 1	WUN; 2	ZWE; 1	ZWE; 2	SAL; 1	SAL; 2	OSC; 1	OSC; 2	NÜR2; 1	NÜR2; 2	20th	3

=== Complete International Formula 3000 results ===
(key) (Races in bold indicate pole position) (Races in italics indicate fastest lap)

Year	Entrant	1	2	3	4	5	6	7	8	9	10	11	12	DC	Points
1998	Auto Sport Racing	OSC	IMO	CAT	SIL	MON	PAU	A1R	HOC; 15	HUN; 12	SPA; 7	PER; Ret	NÜR; 6	22nd	1
1999	WRT Fina	IMO; DNQ	MON; DNQ	CAT; 14	MAG; 2	SIL; 17	A1R; 11	HOC; Ret	HUN; 14	SPA; 11	NÜR; Ret			11th	6
2000	MySAP.com	IMO; 5	SIL; 13	CAT; Ret	NÜR; Ret	MON; DNQ	MAG; 5	A1R; 16	**HOC**; 1	HUN; 17	SPA; 6			6th	15
2001	Coca-Cola Nordic Racing	INT; 12	IMO; 3	CAT; 1	A1R; 3	MON; 7	**NÜR**; 1	**MAG**; 3	**SIL**; 5	HOC; 5	HUN; 11	SPA; 4	MNZ	**3rd**	**39**
2002	Arden International	INT; Ret	IMO; 6	CAT; 2	**A1R**; 1	MON; 3	NÜR; 13	**SIL**; 1	**MAG**; 1	HOC; Ret	**HUN**; DSQ	SPA; 4	MNZ; 2	**3rd**	**50**
2004	Ma-Con Engineering	IMO; 5	CAT; Ret	MON; 14	NÜR; 7	MAG; 2	SIL; 3	HOC; Ret	HUN; 4	SPA; 4	MNZ; 2			4th	38

=== Complete Formula One results ===
(key) (Races in bold indicate pole position)

Year	Team	Chassis	Engine	1	2	3	4	5	6	7	8	9	10	11	12	13	14	15	16	17	WDC	Points
2001	Prost Acer	Prost AP04	Acer V10	AUS	MAL	BRA	SMR	ESP	AUT	MON	CAN	EUR	FRA	GBR	GER	HUN	BEL	ITA; 12	USA; 14	JPN; Ret	24th	0

=== Complete American Le Mans Series results ===
Year	Entrant	Class	Chassis	Engine	1	2	3	4	5	6	7	8	9	10	Rank	Points	Ref
1999	Team Rafanelli SRL	LMP	Riley & Scott Mk III	Judd GV4 4.0 L V10	SEB; Ret	ATL	MOS	SON	POR	PET; 6	MON	LSV			64th	14	
2002	Prodrive	GTS	Ferrari 550-GTS Maranello	Ferrari 5.9 L V12	SEB; 6	SON	MID	AME	WAS	TRO	MOS	MON; 1	MIA; 3	PET; 2	13th	94	
2003	Veloqx Prodrive Racing	GTS	Ferrari 550-GTS Maranello	Ferrari 5.9 L V12	SEB; Ret	ATL; 2	SON; 4	TRO; Ret	MOS; 2	AME; 3	MON; DSQ	MIA; 2	PET; 1		7th	97	
2005	Aston Martin Racing	GT1	Aston Martin DBR9	Aston Martin 6.0L V12	SEB	ATL	MID	LIM	SON	POR	AME	MOS	PET; 5	MON	14th	14	
2006	Aston Martin Racing	GT1	Aston Martin DBR9	Aston Martin 6.0l V12	SEB; 3	LST; 3	LMO; 3	NEN; 3	UTA; 1	POR; 2	AME; 3	MOS; 3	PET; 1	MON; 3	3rd	159	

=== Complete European Le Mans Series results ===
Year	Entrant	Class	Chassis	Engine	1	2	3	4	5	6	7	Rank	Points
2001	Lanesra	LMP900	Panoz LMP-1 Roadster-S	Élan 6L8 6.0L V8	SEB	DON	JAR	EST	MOS; 2	VAL	PLM	17th	21
2004	Larbre Compétition	GTS	Ferrari 550-GTS Maranello	Ferrari 5.9L V12	MNZ	NUR	SIL	SPA; 2				10th	8
2005	MenX	GT1	Ferrari 550-GTS Maranello	Ferrari 5.9L V12	SPA; Ret	MNZ; 2	SIL	NUR	IST			12th	8
2008	Team Modena	GT1	Aston Martin DBR9	Aston Martin 6.0 L V12	CAT; Ret	MNZ; 1	SPA; 3	NUR; 1	SIL; 1			3rd	36
2009	AMR Eastern Europe	LMP1	Lola-Aston Martin B09/60	Aston Martin 6.0 L V12	CAT; 1	SPA; 3	ALG; 2	NUR; 1	SIL; 3			1st	39
2011	Young Driver AMR	GTE Pro	Aston Martin V8 Vantage GT2	Aston Martin 4.5 L V8	PLR; Ret	SPA	IMO	SIL	EST			NC	0

=== Rolex Sports Car Series career ===
(key) (Races in bold indicate pole position)

Year	Team	1	2	3	4	5	6	7	8	9	10	11	12	13	14	Rank	Points	Ref
2007	SAMAX	R24; 6	MEX	MIA	VIR	LAG	WG6; Ret	MOH	DAY	IOW	BAR	MON	WGI; Ret	SON; Ret	SLC; 2	35th	93	
2008	Peter Baron	R24; Ret	MIA	MEX	VIR	LAG	WG6	MOH	DAY	BAR	MON	WGI	SON	NJ	SLC	NC	0	
2009	Alegra Motorsports	R24; Ret	VIR	NJ	LAG	WG6	MOH	DAY	BAR	WGI	MON	SLC	MIA; 12			44th	35	
2011	Starworks Motorsport	R24; Ret	MIA	BAR	VIR	LIM	WG6	ROA	LAG	NJ	WGS	LAG	MON	MOH		NC	0	

=== 24 Hours of Le Mans results ===
Year	Team	Co-Drivers	Car	Class	Laps	Pos.	Class Pos.
2002	(United Kingdom) Prodrive	(Sweden) Rickard Rydell (Switzerland) Alain Menu	Ferrari 550-GTS Maranello	GTS	174	DNF	DNF
2003	(United Kingdom) Veloqx Prodrive Racing	(Netherlands) Peter Kox (United Kingdom) Jamie Davies	Ferrari 550-GTS Maranello	GTS	336	10th	**1st**
2004	(United Kingdom) Prodrive Racing	(Netherlands) Peter Kox (Switzerland) Alain Menu	Ferrari 550-GTS Maranello	GTS	325	11th	4th
2005	(United Kingdom) Aston Martin Racing	(Netherlands) Peter Kox (Portugal) Pedro Lamy	Aston Martin DBR9	GT1	327	DNF	DNF
2006	(United Kingdom) Aston Martin Racing	(United Kingdom) Darren Turner (Italy) Andrea Piccini	Aston Martin DBR9	GT1	350	6th	**2nd**
2007	(United Kingdom) Aston Martin Racing	(United Kingdom) Johnny Herbert (Netherlands) Peter Kox	Aston Martin DBR9	GT1	337	9th	4th
2008	(Czech Republic) Charouz Racing System (United Kingdom) Aston Martin Racing	(Czech Republic) Jan Charouz (Germany) Stefan Mücke	Lola B08/60-Aston Martin	LMP1	354	9th	9th
2009	(Czech Republic) AMR Eastern Europe	(Czech Republic) Jan Charouz (Germany) Stefan Mücke	Lola-Aston Martin B09/60	LMP1	373	4th	4th
2010	(Germany) Young Driver AMR	(Denmark) Christoffer Nygaard (Netherlands) Peter Kox	Aston Martin DBR9	GT1	311	22nd	**3rd**

=== American Open-Wheel ===
(key)

==== IndyCar Series ====
Year	Team	Chassis	No.	Engine	1	2	3	4	5	6	7	8	9	10	11	12	13	14	15	16	17	Rank	Points	Ref
2004	Patrick Racing	Dallara IR-04	20	Chevrolet Indy V8	HMS	PHX	MOT	INDY	TXS	RIR	KAN	NSH	MIL	MIS	KTY	PPIR	NZR	CHI	FON; 16	TX2; 13		27th	31	
2005	Panther Racing	Dallara IR-05	2	Chevrolet Indy V8	HMS; 21	PHX; 20	STP; 16	MOT; DNS	INDY; 19	TXS; 19	RIR; 7	KAN; 11	NSH; 23	MIL	MIS	KTY; 11	PPIR; 6	SNM; 5	CHI; 20	WGL; 13	FON; 8	16th	261	
2006	Cheever Racing	Dallara IR-05	51	Honda HI6R V8	HMS	STP	MOT; 19	INDY	WGL	TXS	RIR	KAN	NSH	MIL	MIS	KTY	SNM	CHI				32nd	12	

=== Complete A1 Grand Prix results ===
(key) (Races in bold indicate pole position) (Races in italics indicate fastest lap)

Year	Entrant	1	2	3	4	5	6	7	8	9	10	11	12	13	14	15	16	17	18	19	20	21	22	DC	Points	Ref
2005–06	Czech Republic	GBR; SPR	GBR; FEA	GER; SPR; 11	GER; FEA; Ret	POR; SPR; 5	POR; FEA; 9	AUS; SPR; Ret	AUS; FEA; Ret	MYS; SPR; 16	MYS; FEA; 3	UAE; SPR; 3	UAE; FEA; Ret	RSA; SPR; 5	RSA; FEA; Ret	IDN; SPR; 10	IDN; FEA; 13	MEX; SPR; 5	MEX; FEA; 7	USA; SPR; 18	USA; FEA; Ret	CHN; SPR; 6	CHN; FEA; 1	12th	56	
2006–07	Czech Republic	NED; SPR	NED; FEA	CZE; SPR; 5	CZE; FEA; 2	BEI; SPR; 8	BEI; FEA; 6	MYS; SPR; Ret	MYS; FEA; 14	IDN; SPR	IDN; FEA	NZL; SPR; 17	NZL; FEA; 12	AUS; SPR; 9	AUS; FEA; 5	RSA; SPR; 11	RSA; FEA; Ret	MEX; SPR	MEX; FEA	SHA; SPR	SHA; FEA	GBR; SPR	GBR; SPR	12th	27	
2007–08	Czech Republic	NED; SPR	NED; FEA	CZE; SPR	CZE; FEA	MYS; SPR	MYS; FEA	ZHU; SPR; 5	ZHU; FEA; 8	NZL; SPR; Ret	NZL; FEA; 11	AUS; SPR; 18	AUS; FEA; 15	RSA; SPR	RSA; FEA	MEX; SPR	MEX; FEA	SHA; SPR	SHA; FEA	GBR; SPR	GBR; SPR			19th	10	

=== Complete FIA GT Championship results ===
Year	Team	Chassis	Engine	Class	1	2	3	4	5	6	7	8	9	10	11	12	Pos	Points
2001	Coca-Cola Racing Team	Porsche 911 GT3-RS	Porsche 3.6L Flat-6	N-GT	MNZ	BRN; 7	MAG; 3	MNZ	ZOL	DIL	BUD	SPA	A1	NUR	JAR	EST	31st	4
2002	BMS Scuderia Italia	Ferrari 550-GTS Maranello	Ferrari 5.9L V12	GT	MAG	SIL	BRN; Ret	JAR	AND	OSC	SPA	PER	DON	EST			NC	0
2003	MenX	Ferrari 360 Modena GT	Ferrari 3.6L V8	N-GT	BAR; 6	MAG; Ret	PER; Ret	BRN; 5	DON	SPA	AND	OSC; 10	EST	MNZ			37th	7
2006	Aston Martin Racing BMS	Aston Martin DBR9	Aston Martin 6.0L V12	GT1	SIL	BRN	OSC	SPA; 4	RIC	DIJ	MUG	HUN	ADR	DUB			30th	5.5
2007	Scuderia Ecosse	Ferrari F430 GT2	Ferrari 4.0L V8	GT2	ZHU; 3	SIL	BUC	MNZ; 7	OSC	SPA; Ret	ADR						18th	9
2007	RBImmo Racing Team Konrad Motorsport	Saleen S7R	Ford 7.0L V8	GT1								BRN; 13	NOG	ZOL			NC	0
2008	IPB Spartak Racing Reiter Engineering	Lamborghini Murciélago R-GT	Lamborghini 6.0 L V12	GT2	SIL	MNZ	ADR	OSC	SPA; 5	BUC	BRN						16th	8
2008	Aston Martin Racing	Aston Martin V8 Vantage GT2	Aston Martin 4.5 L V8	G2								NOG; 1	ZOL; 1	SAN			NC	0

=== Complete GT1 World Championship results ===
Year	Team	Car	1	2	3	4	5	6	7	8	9	10	11	12	13	14	15	16	17	18	19	20	Pos	Points
2010	Young Driver AMR	Aston Martin DBR9	ABU; QR; Ret	ABU; CR; 11	SIL; QR; 4	SIL; CR; EX	BRN; QR; 2	BRN; CR; 2	PRI; QR; 10	PRI; CR; 16	SPA; QR; 10	SPA; CR; 6	NÜR; QR; 1	NÜR; CR; 1	ALG; QR; 4	ALG; CR; 10	NAV; QR; Ret	NAV; CR; 4	INT; QR; 2	INT; CR; 10	SAN; QR; 10	SAN; CR; 15	4th	104
2011	Young Driver AMR	Aston Martin DBR9	ABU; QR; Ret	ABU; CR; 6	ZOL; QR; 3	ZOL; CR; 3	ALG; QR; Ret	ALG; CR; Ret	SAC; QR; 10	SAC; CR; Ret	SIL; QR; 1	SIL; CR; 2	NAV; QR; Ret	NAV; CR; 13	PRI; QR; 2	PRI; CR; 3	ORD; QR; 16	ORD; CR; 14	BEI; QR; 1	BEI; CR; 2	SAN; QR; 5	SAN; CR; 10	4th	103
2012	Reiter Engineering	Lamborghini Gallardo LP600+ GT3	NOG; QR; 3	NOG; CR; 8	ZOL; QR; Ret	ZOL; CR; 8	NAV; QR; 12	NAV; QR; 14	SVK; QR; 2	SVK; CR; Ret	ALG; QR	ALG; CR	SVK; QR	SVK; CR	MOS; QR	MOS; CR	NUR; QR	NUR; CR	DON; QR	DON; CR			19th	18

=== Complete Blancpain Sprint Series results ===
Year	Team	Car	Class	1	2	3	4	5	6	7	8	9	10	11	12	13	14	Pos.	Points
2014	Grasser Racing Team	Lamborghini Gallardo FL2	Pro	NOG; QR; 9	NOG; CR; 16													18th	16
2014	Reiter Engineering	Lamborghini Gallardo FL2	Pro			BRH; QR; 9	BRH; CR; Ret	ZAN; QR	ZAN; CR	SVK; QR; Ret	SVK; CR; DNS							18th	16
2014	G-Drive Racing	Lamborghini Gallardo FL2	Pro									**ALG**; **QR**; 6	ALG; CR; 4	ZOL; QR; 13	ZOL; CR; 9	BAK; QR	BAK; CR	18th	16

=== Dakar Rally results ===
Year	Class	Team	Vehicle	Position	Ref
2021	Light Prototypes (T3)	Buggyra Zero Mileage Racing	Can-Am DV 21	10th	

== See also ==
- 24 Hours of Le Mans 2002, 2003, 2004, 2005, 2006
- List of sportspeople sanctioned for doping offences

Sporting positions
Preceded by Alexandre Prémat; Mike Rockenfeller	Le Mans Series; Champion; 2009; With: Jan Charouz & Stefan Mücke	Succeeded by Stéphane Sarrazin
