= Lola F3000 cars =

Open-wheel formula race car chassis

The Lola F3000 cars is a series of open-wheel formula race cars, designed, developed and built by British manufacturer Lola.

== T950 ==
Lola T950
- Category: Formula 3000
- Constructor: Lola

Technical specifications
- Chassis: Carbon fiber/kevlar composite aluminum honeycomb monocoque
- Suspension (front): Double wishbones, push-rod actuated coil springs over shock absorbers, anti-roll bar
- Suspension (rear): Independent lower wishbones and rocker arm, co-axial coil springs over telescopic shock absorbers, anti-roll bar
- Axle track: 65 in (1,651 mm) (Front); 62 in (1,575 mm) (Rear)
- Wheelbase: 103 in (2,616 mm)
- Engine: Ford-Cosworth DFV 3.0 L (3,000 cc; 183 cu in) V8 naturally-aspirated mid-engined
- Transmission: 5-speed manual
- Power: c. 450 hp (340 kW)
- Weight: 1,188 lb (539 kg)
- Fuel: Methanol

Competition history
- Debut: 1985 BRDC International Trophy

The Lola T950 was used for Formula 3000 racing in 1985.

== T87/50 ==
Lola T87/50
- Category: Formula 3000
- Constructor: Lola
- Predecessor: Lola T86/50
- Successor: Lola T88/50

Technical specifications
- Chassis: Carbon fiber composite honeycomb monocoque
- Suspension (front): independent unequal double wishbones, push-rod actuated coil springs over shock absorbers
- Suspension (rear): independent double wishbones, control links, push-rod actuated coil springs over shock absorbers, anti-roll bar
- Axle track: 66 in (1,676 mm) (front); 61.5 in (1,562 mm) (rear)
- Wheelbase: 100 in (2,540 mm)
- Engine: Ford-Cosworth DFV, Honda-Judd BV, or Yamaha 3.0 L (183 cu in) DOHC V8 naturally-aspirated mid-engined
- Torque: 276 lb⋅ft (374 N⋅m) @ 6,900 rpm
- Transmission: 5-speed manual
- Power: 450 hp (336 kW) @ 9,000 rpm
- Weight: 540 kg (1,190 lb) (including driver)
- Tyres: Avon

Competition history

The Lola T87/50 was built for use in the International Formula 3000 series and the Japanese Formula 3000 series, a feeder series for Formula One, in 1987.

== T88/50 ==
Lola T88/50
- Category: Formula 3000
- Constructor: Lola
- Predecessor: Lola T87/50
- Successor: Lola Horag VAG Can-Am Turbo, Lola T89/50

Technical specifications
- Chassis: Carbon fiber composite honeycomb monocoque
- Suspension (front): independent unequal double wishbones, push-rod actuated coil springs over shock absorbers
- Suspension (rear): independent double wishbones, control links, push-rod actuated coil springs over shock absorbers, anti-roll bar
- Axle track: 66 in (1,676 mm) (front); 61.5 in (1,562 mm) (rear)
- Wheelbase: 100 in (2,540 mm)
- Engine: Ford-Cosworth DFV, Honda-Judd BV, or Yamaha 3.0 L (183 cu in) DOHC V8 naturally-aspirated mid-engined
- Torque: 276 lb⋅ft (374 N⋅m) @ 6,900 rpm
- Transmission: 5-speed manual
- Power: 450 hp (336 kW) @ 9,000 rpm
- Weight: 540 kg (1,190 lb) (including driver)
- Tyres: Avon

Competition history

The Lola T88/50 was used in the International Formula 3000 series, a feeder-series for Formula One, in 1988.

== T89/50 ==
Lola T89/50
- Category: Formula 3000
- Constructor: Lola
- Predecessor: Lola T88/50
- Successor: Lola T90/50

Technical specifications
- Chassis: Carbon fiber composite honeycomb monocoque
- Suspension (front): independent unequal double wishbones, push-rod actuated coil springs over shock absorbers
- Suspension (rear): independent double wishbones, control links, push-rod actuated coil springs over shock absorbers, anti-roll bar
- Axle track: 66 in (1,676 mm) (front); 61.5 in (1,562 mm) (rear)
- Wheelbase: 100 in (2,540 mm)
- Engine: Ford-Cosworth DFV, Honda-Judd BV, or Yamaha 3.0 L (183 cu in) DOHC V8 naturally-aspirated mid-engined
- Torque: 276 lb⋅ft (374 N⋅m) @ 6,900 rpm
- Transmission: 5-speed manual
- Power: 463 hp (345 kW) @ 9,000 rpm
- Weight: 540 kg (1,190 lb) (including driver)
- Tyres: Avon

Competition history

The Lola T89/50 is an open-wheel formula race car chassis developed by British manufacturer Lola, for use in the International Formula 3000 series, a feeder-series for Formula One, in 1989. It was later converted into a closed-wheel sports prototype race car, and used in the European Interserie, between 1994 and 1995.

== T90/50 ==
Lola T90/50
- Category: Formula 3000
- Constructor: Lola
- Successor: Lola T91/50

Technical specifications
- Chassis: Carbon fiber composite honeycomb monocoque
- Suspension (front): independent unequal double wishbones, push-rod actuated coil springs over shock absorbers
- Suspension (rear): independent double wishbones, control links, push-rod actuated coil springs over shock absorbers, anti-roll bar
- Axle track: 67–67.4 in (1,702–1,712 mm) (front); 61.4–62.4 in (1,560–1,585 mm) (rear)
- Wheelbase: 103.5 in (2,629 mm)
- Engine: Ford-Cosworth DFV, Mugen MF308 3.0 L (183 cu in) DOHC V8 naturally-aspirated mid-engined
- Torque: 276 lb⋅ft (374 N⋅m) @ 6,900 rpm
- Transmission: 5-speed manual
- Power: 450 hp (336 kW) @ 9,000 rpm
- Weight: 540 kg (1,190 lb) (including driver)
- Tyres: Avon

Competition history

The Lola T90/50 was used in the International Formula 3000 series, a feeder-series for Formula One, in 1990.

== T91/50 ==
Lola T91/50
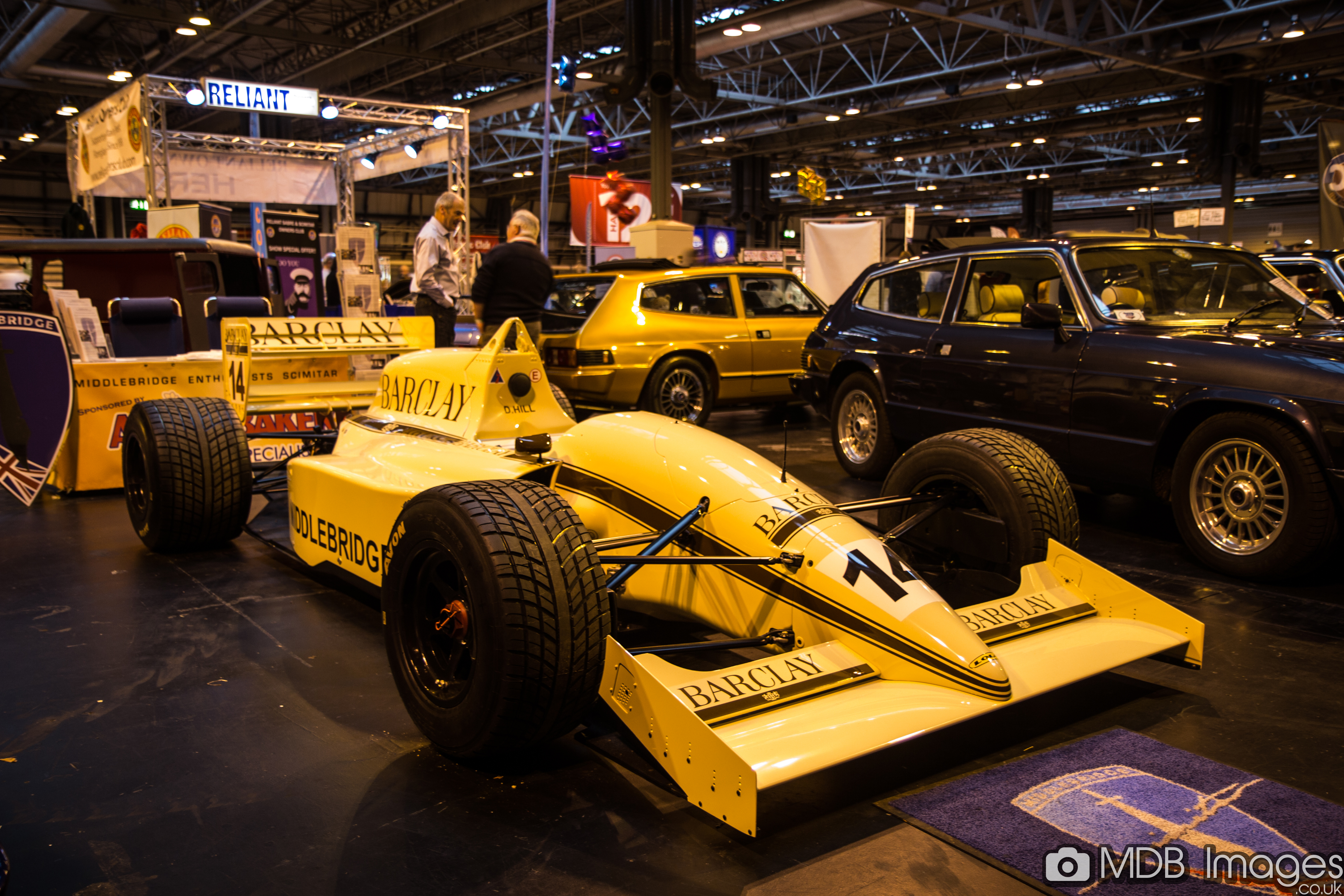
- Category: Formula 3000
- Constructor: Lola
- Production: 1991 (41 models produced)
- Predecessor: Lola T90/50
- Successor: Lola T92/50

Technical specifications
- Chassis: Carbon fiber composite honeycomb monocoque
- Suspension (front): independent unequal double wishbones, push-rod actuated coil springs over shock absorbers
- Suspension (rear): independent double wishbones, control links, push-rod actuated coil springs over shock absorbers, anti-roll bar
- Axle track: 67–67.4 in (1,702–1,712 mm) (front); 61.4–62.4 in (1,560–1,585 mm) (rear)
- Wheelbase: 103.5 in (2,629 mm)
- Engine: F3000; Ford-Cosworth DFV, Mugen MF308, 3.0 L (183 cu in), DOHC V8, naturally-aspirated, mid-engined Formula Brabham; Holden, 3.8 L (232 cu in), V6, naturally-aspirated, mid-engined
- Torque: 276 lb⋅ft (374 N⋅m) @ 6,900 rpm
- Transmission: 5-speed manual
- Power: F3000: 450 hp (336 kW) @ 9,000 rpm Formula Brabham: 320 hp (239 kW)
- Weight: 540 kg (1,190 lb) (including driver)
- Tyres: Avon, Dunlop

Competition history

The Lola T91/50 was used for various international Formula 3000 championships, in 1991.

The car also saw service in Australia's Formula Brabham with Mark Skaife winning the 1993 Australian Drivers' Championship in his T91/50 powered by a 3.8L Holden V6 engine (the standard engine of the category).

== T92/50 ==
Lola T92/50
- Category: Formula 3000
- Constructor: Lola
- Predecessor: Lola T91/50
- Successor: Lola T93/50

Technical specifications
- Chassis: Carbon fiber composite honeycomb monocoque
- Suspension (front): independent unequal double wishbones, push-rod actuated coil springs over shock absorbers
- Suspension (rear): independent double wishbones, control links, push-rod actuated coil springs over shock absorbers, anti-roll bar
- Axle track: 67–67.4 in (1,702–1,712 mm) (front); 61.4–62.4 in (1,560–1,585 mm) (rear)
- Wheelbase: 103.5 in (2,629 mm)
- Engine: Ford-Cosworth DFV, Mugen MF308 3.0 L (183 cu in) DOHC V8 naturally-aspirated mid-engined
- Torque: 276 lb⋅ft (374 N⋅m) @ 6,900 rpm
- Transmission: 5-speed manual
- Power: 450 hp (336 kW) @ 9,000 rpm
- Weight: 540 kg (1,190 lb) (including driver)
- Tyres: Avon

Competition history

The Lola T92/50 was used for various international Formula 3000 championships, in 1992. The car was eventually converted into a prototype-style chassis, and used in open rules championships like Interserie.

== T96/50 ==
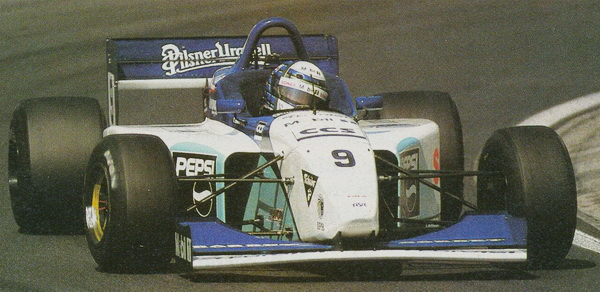
Tomáš Enge in a Lola T96/50 F3000 chassis in 1998.

The Lola T96/50 was used for the International Formula 3000 series, between 1996 and 1998 (1999 for Italian F3000), until it was replaced by the new Lola B99/50 chassis for the new in 1998. Unrelated chassis, dubbed the Lola T96/51 and Lola T96/52 were based on the T95/50 and were used in the Japanese Formula Nippon series until 1999, and were powered by 3.0 L (180 cu in) Mugen V8 engines.

=== Specifications ===
These are:

- Engine displacement: Cosworth DFY/Zytek-Judd KV F3000 3.0 L (183 cu in) DOHC V8
- Power output: 450–460 hp (336–343 kW) @ 9,000 rpm
- Torque output: 276–290 lb⋅ft (374–393 N⋅m) @ 6,900 rpm
- Compression ratio: 13.6:1
- Bore: 88–89 mm (3.5–3.5 in)
- Stroke: 60.2–61.5 mm (2.4–2.4 in)
- Engine weight: 120 kg (265 lb)
- Gearbox: 5-speed sequential manual gearbox + reverse
- Weight: 540 kg (1,190 lb) (including driver)
- Fuel: 102 RON unleaded
- Fuel delivery: Zytek Electronic-indirect fuel injection
- Aspiration: Naturally-aspirated
- Front Track Width: 1,708 mm (67 in)
- Rear Track Width: 1,594 mm (63 in)
- Wheelbase: 2,819 mm (111 in)
- Length: 4,405 mm (173 in)
- Steering: Non-assisted rack and pinion

== B99/50 ==
Lola B99/50
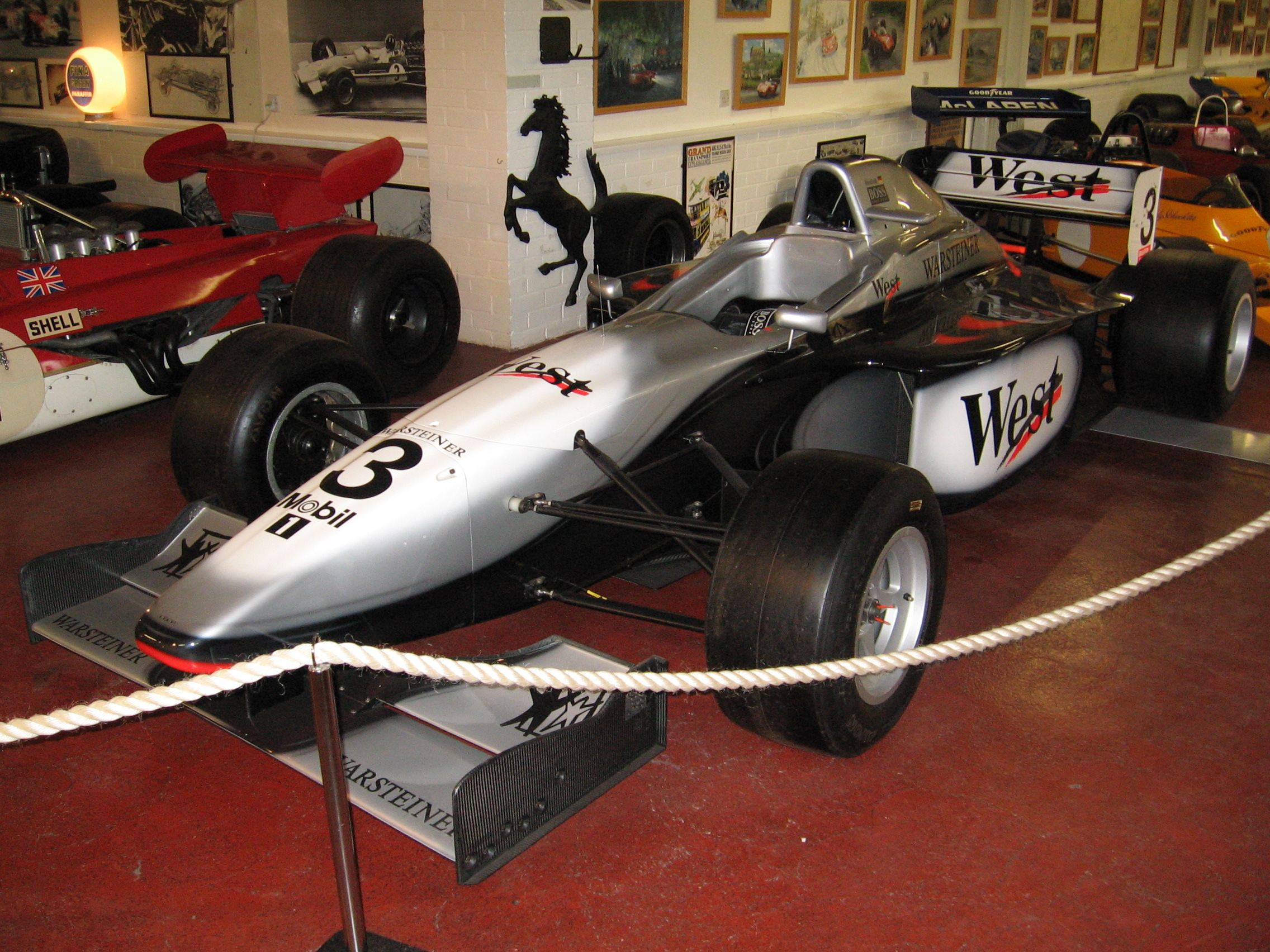
- The Lola B99/50 of 1999 Drivers' Champion Nick Heidfeld.

Technical specifications
- Length: 4,833 mm (190 in)
- Width: 1,476 mm (58 in)
- Wheelbase: 3,000 mm (118 in)
- Engine: Cosworth DFY/Zytek-Judd KV F3000 3.0 L (183 cu in) DOHC V8
- Torque: 276–300 lb⋅ft (374–407 N⋅m) @ 6,900 rpm
- Transmission: 6-speed paddle-shift sequential gearbox (must have reverse)
- Power: 450–475 hp (336–354 kW) @ 9,000 rpm
- Weight: 575 kg (1,268 lb) (including driver)
- Fuel: 102 RON unleaded
- Tyres: Avon

Competition history
- Notable entrants: All F3000 teams
- Notable drivers: All F3000 drivers
- Debut: 1999 Imola F3000 round
- Last event: 2001 Monza F3000 round

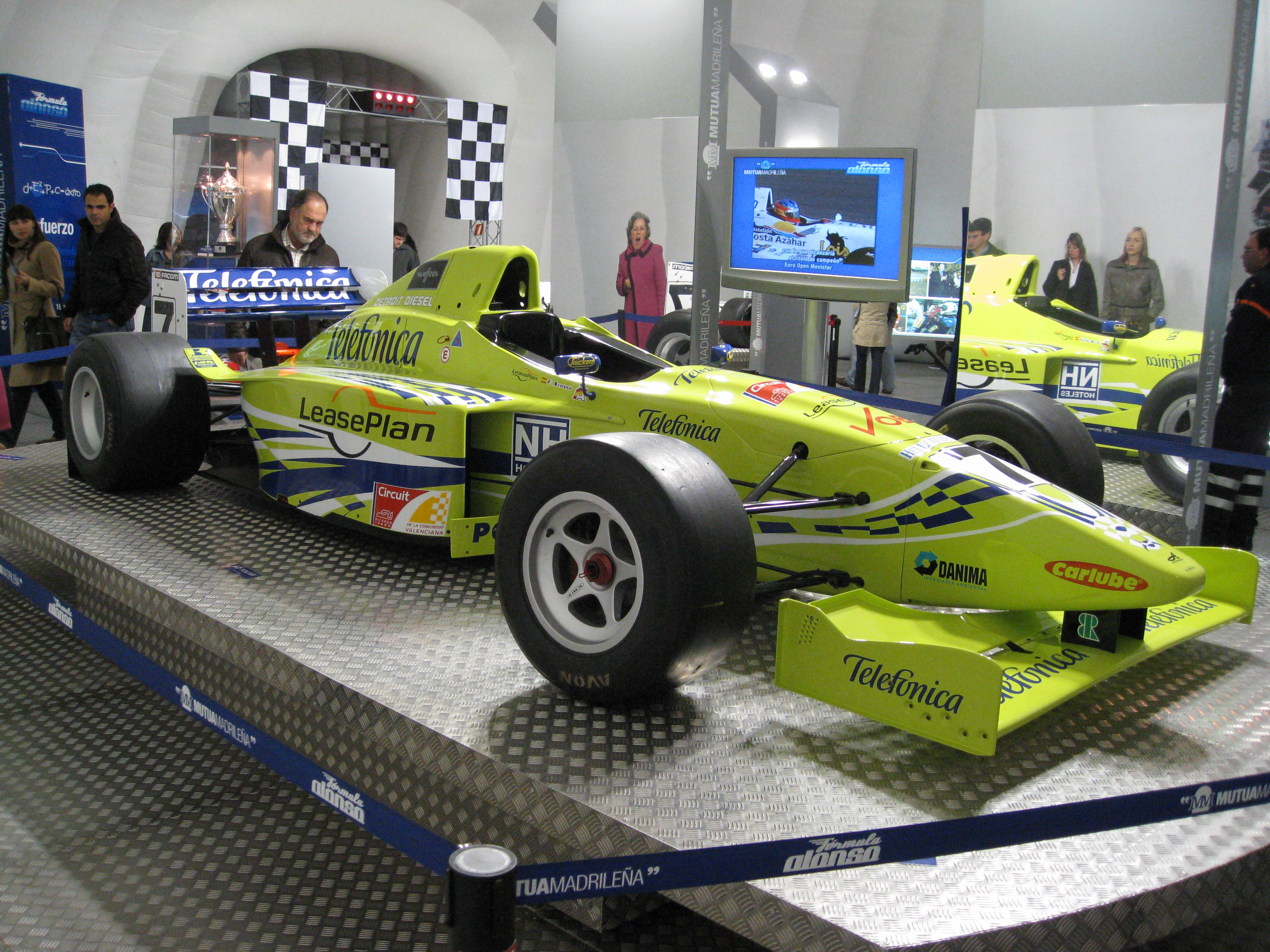
The B99/50 driven by Fernando Alonso in 2000.

The Lola B99/50 was used in the International Formula 3000 series, between 1999 and 2001, until it was replaced by the new Lola B02/50 chassis for the new in 2002.

The car was conceived as the only car admitted to the International Formula 3000 starting from the 1999 season. She was employed for three seasons in that championship (until 2001), before being replaced by the Lola B02/50. Subsequently, in 2002, it was introduced in the Euro Formula 3000 championship. It was used exclusively until 2004, to then be joined with the more modern Lola B02/50. A separate classification was reserved for riders using the old chassis. It was also used in the 3000 Pro Series in 2005 and 2006.

Currently, together with the most recent model, the Lola B02/50, it is used in uphill speed races at the Italian and European level; in constant struggle with the FA-30 single-seater of the Italian manufacturer Osella Corse.

=== Final year specifications ===
- Compression ratio: 13.6:1
- Bore: 88–89 mm (3.5–3.5 in)
- Stroke: 60.2–61.5 mm (2.4–2.4 in)
- Engine weight: 120 kg (265 lb)
- Fuel delivery: Zytek Electronic-indirect fuel injection
- Aspiration: Naturally-aspirated
- Steering: Non-assisted rack and pinion

== B02/50 ==
Lola B02/50
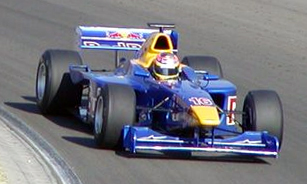
- Vitantonio Liuzzi's 2003-spec Lola B02/50 chassis at that year's Hungaroring round.

Technical specifications
- Width: 1,476 mm (58 in)
- Wheelbase: 3,000 mm (118 in)
- Engine: Zytek-Judd KV F3000 3.0 L (183 cu in) DOHC V8
- Torque: 300 lb⋅ft (407 N⋅m) @ 7,000 rpm
- Transmission: 6-speed paddle-shift sequential gearbox (must have reverse)
- Power: 450–520 hp (336–388 kW) @ 10,500 rpm
- Weight: 545 kg (1,202 lb) (including driver)
- Fuel: 102 RON unleaded
- Tyres: Avon

Competition history
- Notable entrants: All F3000 teams All A1 Grand Prix teams
- Debut: 2002 Interlagos F3000 round
- Last event: 2004 Monza F3000 round

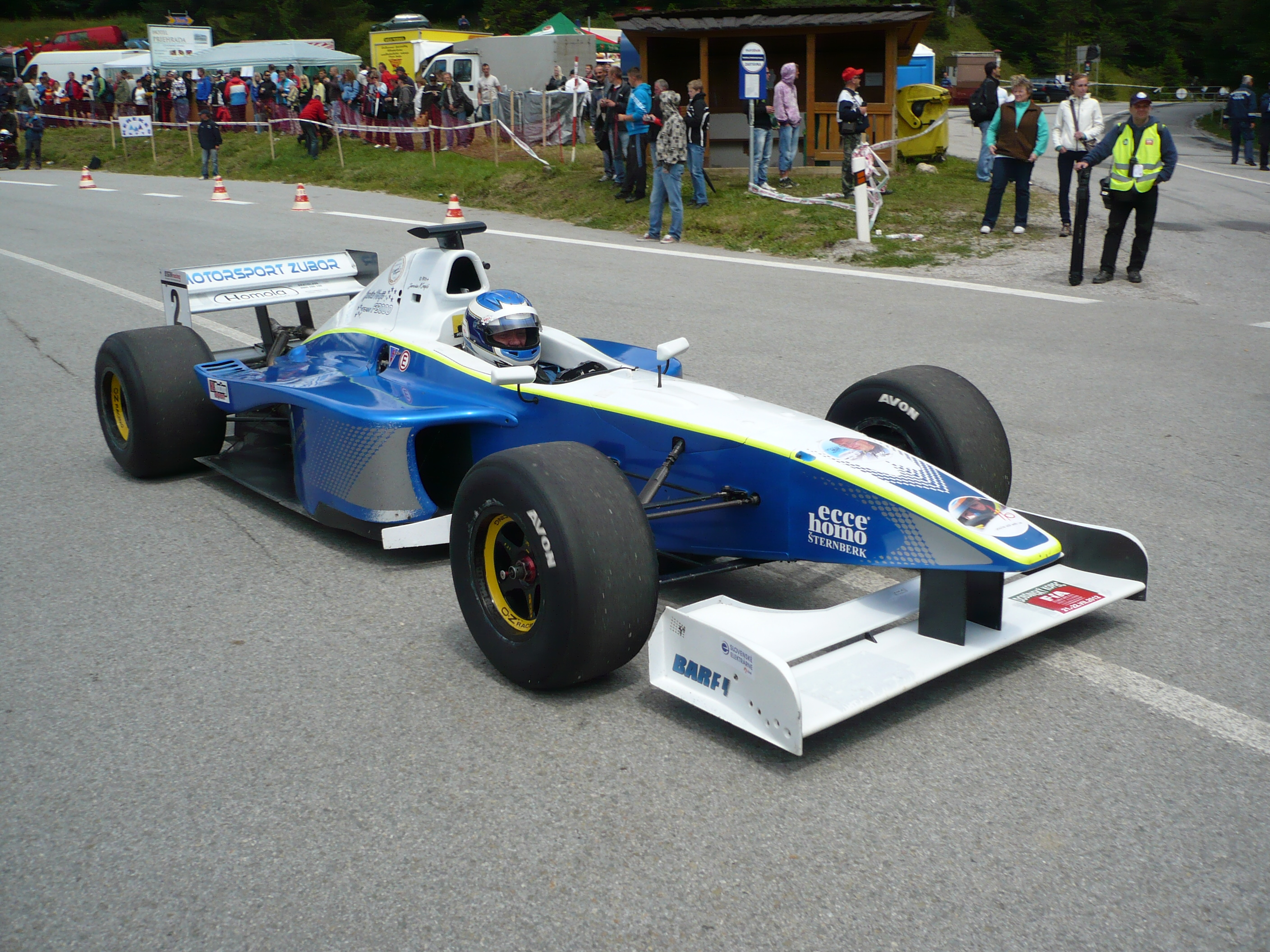
Jaroslav Krajči in a Lola B02/50 chassis at a hillclimbing event in 2012.

The Lola B02/50 was used for the International Formula 3000 series from 2002 to 2004, until it was replaced by the new Dallara GP2/05 chassis for the new GP2 Series in 2005. This car is featured in the video game Live for Speed as part of the S2 license.

=== Final year specifications ===
- Compression ratio: 13.0:1
- Bore: 88 mm (3.5 in)
- Stroke: 61.5 mm (2.4 in)
- Engine weight: 120 kg (265 lb)
- Fuel delivery: Electronic-indirect fuel injection
- Aspiration: Naturally-aspirated
- Steering: Non-assisted rack and pinion
