= Yamaha GTS1000 =

1993-1999 sport touring motorcycle made by Yamaha

GTS1000
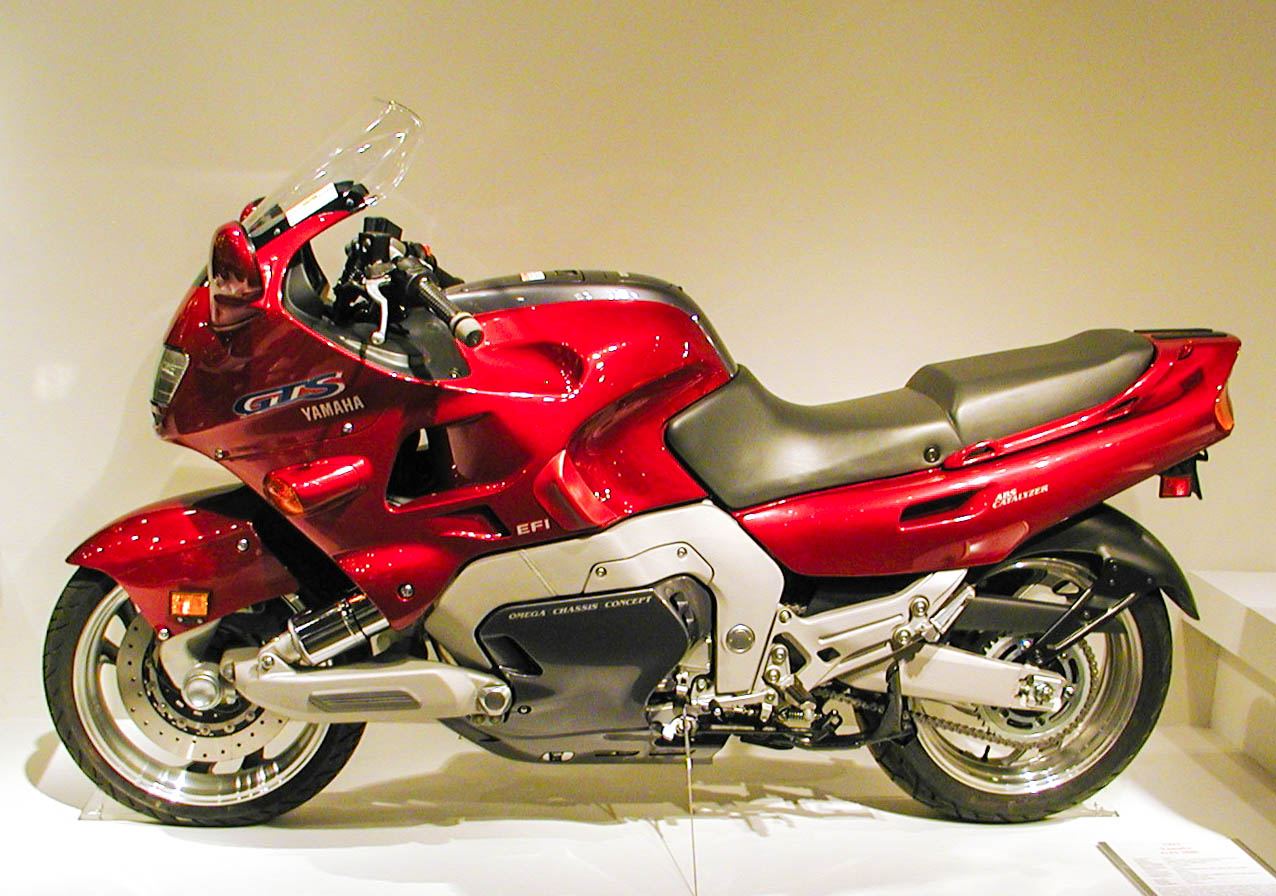
- Manufacturer: Yamaha Motor Company
- Production: 1993–1999
- Predecessor: FJ 1200
- Successor: FJR 1300
- Class: Sport-touring
- Engine: Water-cooled, inline 4 cylinder, EFI, DOHC Genesis engine
- Power: 76 kW (102 hp) @ 9,000 rpm
- Torque: 106.0 N⋅m (78.2 lb⋅ft) @ 6,500 rpm
- Transmission: 5-speed
- Suspension: RADD front suspension, mono-shock rear
- Brakes: ABS and non-ABS disc, front and rear
- Tires: Front: 130/60 ZR17; rear: 170/60 ZR17
- Wheelbase: 1,500 mm (58.9 in)
- Dimensions: L: 2,165 mm (85.2 in); W: 700 mm (28 in); H: 1,255 mm (49.4 in)
- Seat height: 790 mm (31 in)
- Weight: 251 kg (553 lb) (dry); 274 kg (604 lb) (wet)
- Fuel capacity: 20 L (4.4 imp gal; 5.3 US gal)

The Yamaha GTS1000 is a sport-touring motorcycle introduced by Yamaha in 1993, sold until 1994 in the United States, and sold elsewhere until 1999. It is notable for its forkless front suspension, specifically a RADD, Inc., front suspension designed by James Parker. This suspension provided improved stability under braking, but the improvement did not justify the additional cost for the consumer, and the bike was not commercially successful.

The GTS1000 also had advanced technologies not normally found on motorcycles at the time, such as OCC (Omega Chassis concept), single sided front swingarm, electronic fuel injection, ABS brakes, catalytic converter and six-piston front-brake caliper.

The engine was taken from the Yamaha FZR1000 of the time, and incorporated Yamaha's Genesis engine technology, though it was limited by design to 100 bhp (75 kW). In 2006, Bike declared the 1994 Yamaha GTS1000 the coolest of rare motorcycles. "Scarce, stylish, yet capable and completely usable: that's cool in our book."
