= Yamaha OX66 engine =

Racing engine

Yamaha OX66
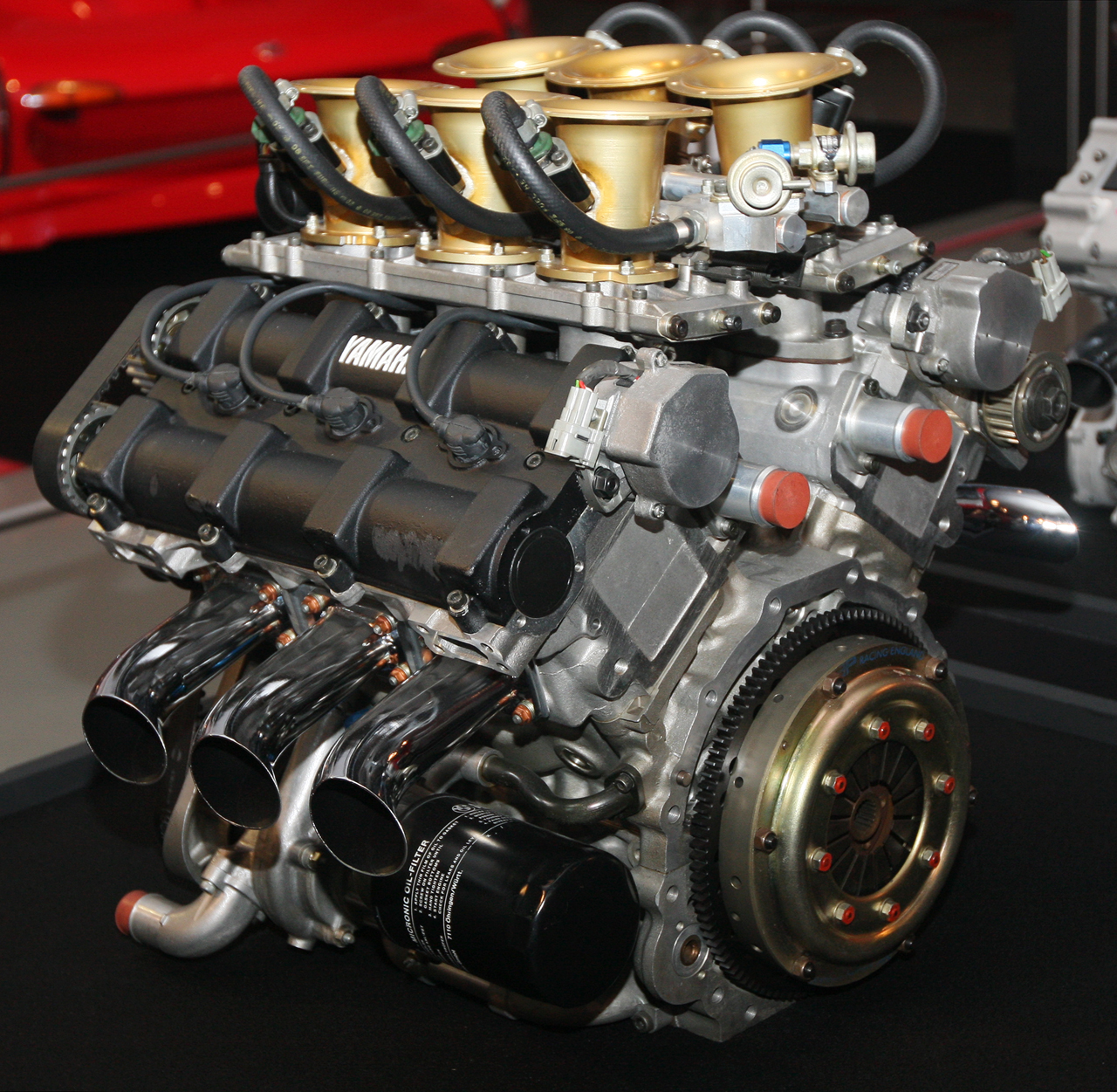

Overview
- Manufacturer: Yamaha

Layout
- Configuration: 75° V6
- Displacement: 1,995 cc (121.7 cu in)
- Cylinder bore: 85.07 mm (3.349 in)
- Piston stroke: 58.5 mm (2.303 in)
- Cylinder block material: Aluminum with iron wet cylinder liners
- Valvetrain: 5-valve DOHC
- Valvetrain drive system: Belt

Combustion
- Fuel system: Electronically controlled fuel injection

Output
- Power output: 330 PS (243 kW) @ 11,000 rpm
- Torque output: 225.5 N⋅m (166.3 ft⋅lb) @ 9,000 rpm

Dimensions
- Dry weight: 105 kg (231.5 lb)

Chronology
- Successor: Yamaha OX77

The Yamaha OX66 is a naturally aspirated V6 racing engine developed and built by Yamaha in the 1980s.

== History ==
Yamaha started development of the OX66 in 1984 as a design concept for a lightweight and compact Formula Two engine with a wide power band.

At the time of development, both BMW and Honda provided engines for F2 (in the form of the M12/7 inline-four and the RA260E V6 respectively), but Honda's engine yielded superior results despite limited use. Therefore, Yamaha pursued an advantage over Honda with a V6 design of their own.

Participation in the race was carried out in partnership with Ken Matsuura Racing Service. The Fédération Internationale de l'Automobile replaced Formula Two with Formula 3000 in 1985, but the Japan Automobile Federation announced that it would continue with F2, so Yamaha proceeded with the development and use of the OX66.

== Design ==
=== Cylinder block ===
With the OX66, compactness was prioritized over even power delivery, hence the unconventional bank angle of 75 degrees. In order to reduce weight, the cylinder block is cast from aluminum. Cast iron wet cylinder liners are used to prevent the thermal deformation of the block from affecting the cylinders, and were designed to be replaced if needed, aiding in maintenance.

=== Valvetrain ===
The OX66 uses a five-valve system derived from Yamaha's prior experience with five-valve technology, with three intake valves and two exhaust valves per cylinder. The use of five valves decreases the inertia of each individual intake valve (since they are smaller), but also offers more stable combustion under low-load conditions compared to Honda's four-valve RA260E.

A timing belt was chosen to drive the camshafts for weight reduction and maintenance reasons. Unlike with a gear drive system, where incorrectly tightened cylinder heads can introduce backlash, a tensioner can be used to ensure the belt works optimally.

In a normal belt drive, the crankshaft has a sprocket that directly meshes with the belt, which usually results in the camshaft sprockets being made twice as large. To decrease the diameter of the camshaft sprockets and make the engine more compact, a reduction gear train is used that indirectly connects the crankshaft to two separate timing belts, one per cylinder bank.

=== Fuel system ===
When the OX66 was first announced for the 1985 season, electronic control was adopted for the fuel and ignition systems. The fuel system used electronic fuel injection manufactured by Nippon Denso. Using an air temperature sensor and an engine speed sensor, it issued corrections based on the position of the throttle valves. Initially, the injectors were installed directly above the intakes, but were later repositioned to the sides of the intake stacks. The ignition was also electronically controlled. One igniter was installed on each bank, with six coils to distribute power. Timing was controlled by a pulse generator at the rear end of each intake camshaft.

Per the mass production specifications of 1986, the electronic injection was replaced with Bosch mechanical injection, which was easier to adjust. In addition, a Bosch system had one more control element than a Lucas system (accounting for volumetric efficiency varying at different engine speeds), and the injection amount could be controlled more accurately. Since the fuel injection pump is installed between the cylinder banks, the six coils that had been installed previously could not fit. Therefore, the number of coils was halved and a distributor was installed. The fuel injection pump is driven by a belt connected to the left bank's intake camshaft.

== Racing history ==
Yamaha was scheduled to participate only in the All Japan F2 Championship at the time of the announcement, but later decided to participate in the Fuji Grand Champion Series as well. A muffler was installed onto each of the two exhaust pipes, as required by the Grand Champion Series (and F2 as a whole from 1985). The Grand Champion Series also stipulated that competitors' engines were to be made commercially available to other teams. Following a limited run of development engines in 1985, the OX66 became available to other teams on a rental basis in 1986.

=== 1985 ===
In 1985, the OX66 was tested in two cars under actual competition conditions, driven by Geoff Lees and Keiji Matsumoto. As the OX66's performance was on par with that of Honda's RA265E, it was greenlit for use by both works and customer teams in 1986.

=== 1986 ===
In 1986, the OX66 saw use by 9 teams in the Grand Champion Series and 11 teams in F2. Alongside Ken Matsuura Racing Service, Tomei Engine and Ogawa Motor were also in charge of maintenance. Lees won the second round of the Grand Champion Series (later becoming series champion), and Matsumoto won the third round. In that year's F2 championship, Lees won a total of four races, but lost the overall title to Satoru Nakajima.

However, after it was found that the upkeep cost of the OX66 would be two to three times that of a BMW F2 engine, teams unsuccessfully negotiated with Yamaha to reduce maintenance costs. As a result, in 1987, the All-Japan Formula Two series made way for the All-Japan Formula 3000.

=== 1987 ===
Aguri Suzuki and Kaoru Iida drove for Yamaha in the 1987 Grand Champion Series, which still allowed F2-engined cars. Their OX66-equipped cars weighed a minimum of 560 kg (1,230 lb). Although 10 kg heavier than the previous year's F2 cars, they were still at a weight advantage compared to the 610 kg (1,340 lb) F3000 cars. Suzuki decided to compete against the F3000-spec cars with his lighter-weight machine, but was ultimately outpaced by the F3000 cars' higher power. He did, however, place fourth in qualifying and third overall.
