= Multi-valve =

Type of car engine

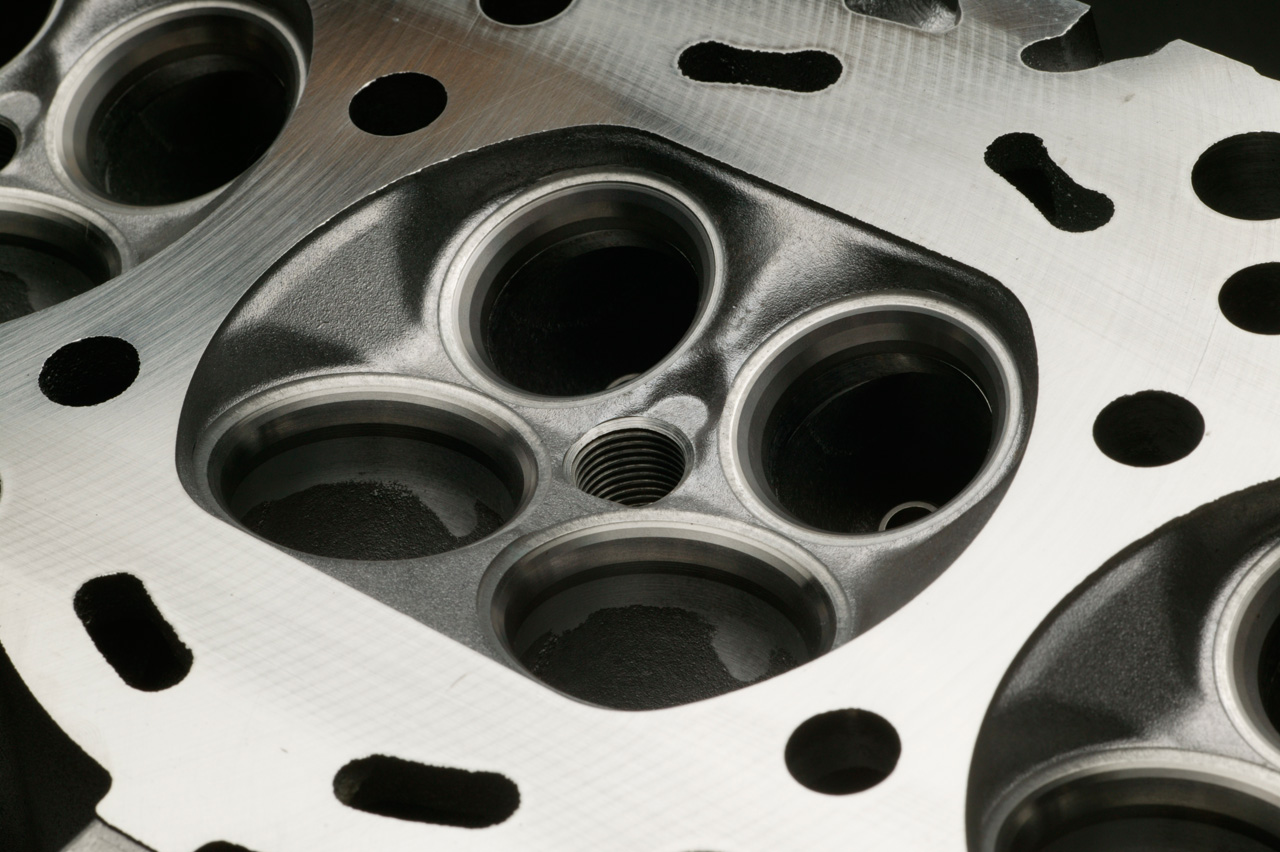
A cylinder head of a four-valve Nissan VQ engine

A multi-valve or multivalve four-stroke internal combustion engine is one where each cylinder has more than two valves – more than the minimum required of one of each, for the purposes of air and fuel intake, and venting exhaust gases. Multi-valve engines were conceived to improve one or both of these, often called "better breathing", and with the added benefit of more valves that are smaller, thus having less mass in motion (per individual valve and spring), may also be able to operate at higher revolutions per minute (rpm) than a two-valve engine, delivering even more intake and/or exhaust per unit of time, thus potentially more power.

== Multi-valve rationale ==
=== Multi-valve engine design ===
A multi-valve engine design has three, four, or five poppet valves per cylinder, to achieve greater performance. In automotive engineering, any four-stroke internal combustion engine needs at least two valves per cylinder: one for intake of air (and often fuel), and another for exhaust of combustion gases. Adding more valves increases valve area, which improves the flow of intake and exhaust gases, thereby enhancing combustion, volumetric efficiency, and power output. Multi-valve geometry allows the spark plug to be ideally located within the combustion chamber for optimal flame propagation. Multi-valve engines tend to have smaller valves that have lower reciprocating mass, which can reduce wear on each cam lobe, and allow more power from higher rpm without the danger of valve float. Some engines are designed to open each intake valve at a slightly different time, which increases turbulence, improving the mixing of air and fuel at low engine speeds. More valves also provide additional cooling to the cylinder head.

Disadvantages of multi-valve engines are a greater parts count, and thus an increase in manufacturing and possibly also maintenance costs, and a potential increase in oil consumption due to the greater number of valve stem seals.

Most multi-valve engines are dual overhead camshaft (DOHC) designs, but some single overhead camshaft (SOHC) multi-valve engines exist – for instance the Mazda B8-ME engine) uses fork-shaped rocker arms, so that its single overhead camshaft can drive two valves at once (generally the exhaust valves), so that fewer cam lobes will be needed in order to reduce manufacturing costs.

- Three-valve cylinder head

This has a single large exhaust valve and two smaller intake valves. A three-valve layout allows better breathing than a two-valve head, but the large exhaust valve results in an rpm limit no higher than a two-valve head. The manufacturing cost for this design can be lower than for a four-valve design. The three-valve design was common in the late 1980s and early 1990s; and from 2004 the main valve arrangement used in Ford F-Series trucks, and Ford SUVs. The Ducati ST3 V-twin had 3-valve heads.

- Four-valve cylinder head

This is the most common type of multi-valve head, with two exhaust valves and two similar (or slightly larger) inlet valves. This design allows similar breathing as compared to a three-valve head, and as the small exhaust valves allow high rpm, this design is very suitable for high power outputs.

- Five-valve cylinder head

Less common is the five-valve head, with two exhaust valves and three inlet valves. All five valves are similar in size. This design allows excellent breathing, and, as every valve is small, high rpm and very high power outputs are theoretically available. Although, compared to a four-valve engine, a five-valve design should have a higher maximum rpm, and the three inlet ports should give efficient cylinder-filling and high gas turbulence (both desirable traits), it has been questioned whether a five-valve configuration gives a cost-effective benefit over four-valve designs. The rise of direct injection may also make five-valve heads more difficult to engineer, as the injector must take up some space on the head. After making five-valve Genesis engines for several years, Yamaha has since reverted to the cheaper four-valve design.

Examples of the five-valve engines are the various 1.8 L 20vT engines manufactured by AUDI AG, the later versions of the Ferrari Dino V8, and the 1.6 L 20-valve 4A-GE engine made by Toyota in collaboration with Yamaha.

- Beyond five valves

For a cylindrical bore and equal-area sized valves, increasing the number of valves beyond five decreases the total valve area. The following table shows the effective areas of differing valve quantities as proportion of cylinder bore. These percentages are based on simple geometry and do not take into account orifices for spark plugs or injectors, but these voids will usually be sited in the "dead space" unavailable for valves. Also, in practice, intake valves are often larger than exhaust valves in heads with an even number of valves-per-cylinder:

- 2 = 50%
- 3 = 64%
- 4 = 68%
- 5 = 68%
- 6 = 66%
- 7 = 64%
- 8 = 61%

=== Alternative technologies ===
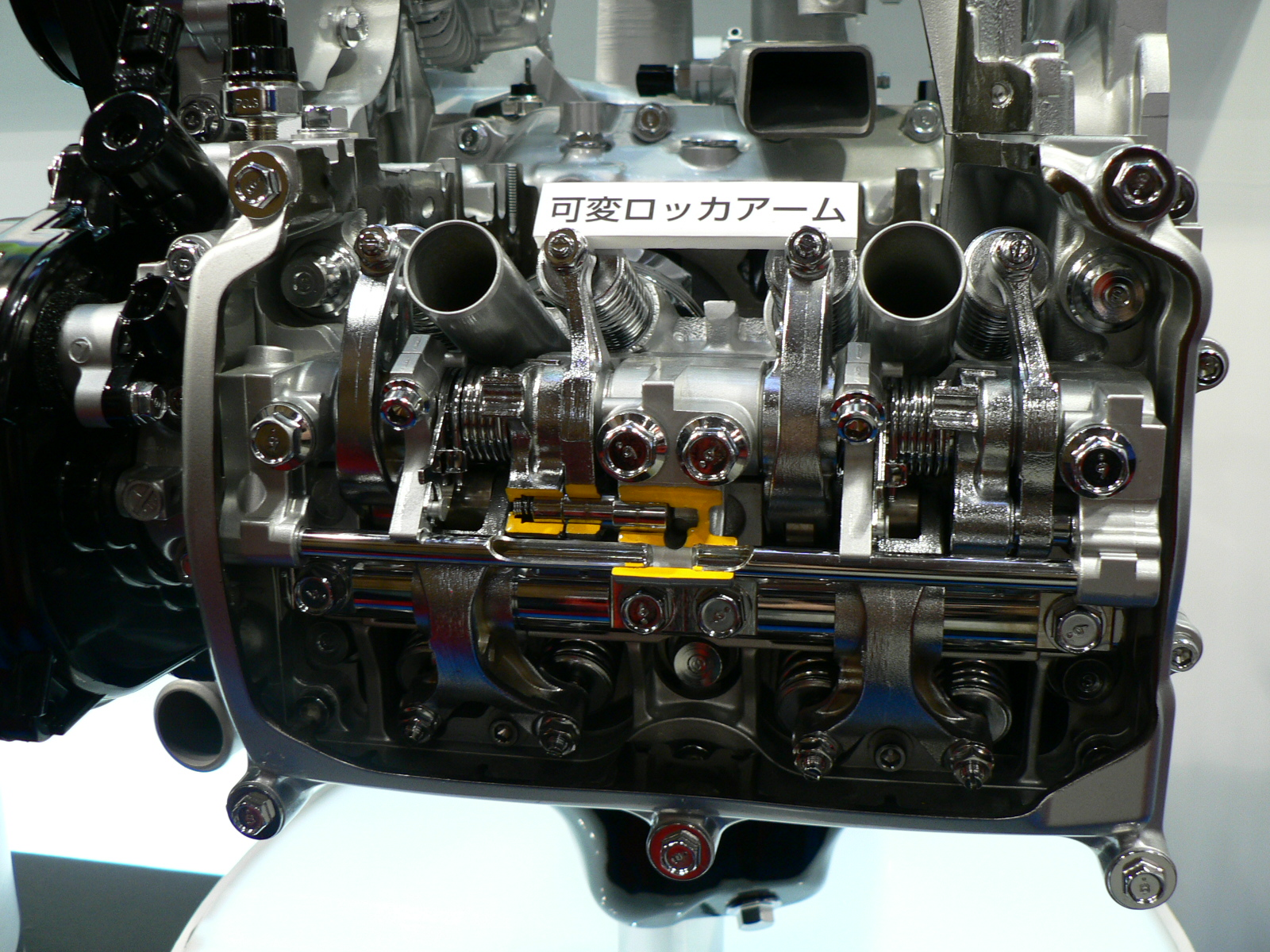
Cutaway model of Subaru's i-AVLS variable valve timing system on SOHC 4-valve-per-cylinder EJ25 boxer engine at Tokyo Motor Show 2007.

Turbocharging and supercharging are technologies that also improve engine breathing, and can be used instead of, or in conjunction with, multi-valve engines. The same applies to variable valve timing and variable-length intake manifolds. Rotary valves also offer improved engine breathing and high rev performance but these were never very successful. Cylinder head porting, as part of engine tuning, is also used to improve engine performance.

== Cars and trucks ==
=== Before 1914 ===
The first motorcar in the world to use an overhead camshaft engine was the Marr in 1902, which had a single-cylinder engine with a single overhead camshaft featuring two valves per cylinder. Engines with more than two valves per cylinder were introduced later; the 1908 Ariès VT race cars had 1.4-liter supercharged single-cylinder engines with four desmodromic valves per cylinder, and the 1910 Isotta Fraschini Tipo KM had a 10.6-liter single overhead camshaft straight-4 with four valves per cylinder producing 100–140 bhp (75–104 kW). The Isotta Fraschini Tipo KM's engine was also one the first engines to have a fully enclosed overhead valve gear.

The first motorcar in the world to have an engine with two overhead camshafts and four valves per cylinder was the 1912 Peugeot L76 Grand Prix race car designed by Ernest Henry. Its 7.6-liter monobloc straight-4 with modern hemispherical combustion chambers produced 148 bhp (110 kW), which is 19.5 hp/L (14.5 kW/L; 0.3 hp/cu in). In April 1913, on the Brooklands racetrack in England, a specially built L76 called "la Torpille" (torpedo) beat the world speed record of 170 km/h. Robert Peugeot also commissioned the young Ettore Bugatti to develop a GP racing car for the 1912 Grand Prix. This chain-driven Bugatti Type 18 had a 5-liter straight-4 with SOHC and three valves per cylinder (two inlet, one exhaust). It produced approximately 100 bhp (75 kW; 101 PS) at 2800 rpm (0.30 bhp per cubic inch) and could reach 99 mph (159 km/h). The three-valve head would later be used for some of Bugatti's most famous cars, including the 1922 Type 29 Grand Prix racer and the legendary Type 35 of 1924. Both Type 29 and Type 35 had a 100 bhp (75 kW) 2-liter SOHC 24-valve NA straight-8 that produced 0.82 bhp (0.61 kW) per cubic inch.

=== Between 1914 and 1945 ===
A.L.F.A. 40/60 GP was a fully working early racing car prototype made by the company now called Alfa Romeo. Only one example was built in 1914, which was later modified in 1921. This design of Giuseppe Merosi was the first Alfa Romeo DOHC engine. It had four valves per cylinder, 90-degree valve angle and twin-spark ignition. The GP engine had a displacement of 4.5-liter (4490 cc) and produced 88 bhp (66 kW) at 2950 rpm (14.7 kW/liter), and after modifications in 1921 102 bhp (76 kW) at 3000 rpm. The top speed of this car was 88-93 mph (140–149 km/h). It wasn't until the 1920s when these DOHC engines came to Alfa road cars like the Alfa Romeo 6C.

In 1916, US automotive magazine Automobile Topics described a four-cylinder, four-valve-per-cylinder car engine made by Linthwaite-Hussey Motor Co. of Los Angeles, CA, USA: "Firm offers two models of high-speed motor with twin intakes and exhausts.".

Early multi-valve engines in T-head configuration were the 1917 Stutz straight-4, White Motor Car Model GL 327 CID Dual Valve Mononblock four, and 1919 Pierce-Arrow straight-6 engines. The standard flathead engines of that day were not very efficient and designers tried to improve engine performance by using multiple valves. The Stutz Motor Company used a modified T-head with 16 valves, twin-spark ignition and aluminium pistons to produce 80 bhp (59 kW) at 2400 rpm from a 360.8 cid (5.8-liter) straight-4 (0.22 bhp per cubic inch). Over 2300 of these powerful early multi-valve engines were built. Stutz not only used them in their famous Bearcat sportscar but in their standard touring cars as well. The mono block White Motor Car engine developed 72 horsepower and less than 150 were built, only three are known to exist today. In 1919 Pierce-Arrow introduced its 524.8 cid (8.6-liter) straight-6 with 24 valves. The engine produced 48.6 bhp (0.09 bhp per cubic inch) and ran very quietly, which was an asset to the bootleggers of that era.

Multi-valve engines continued to be popular in racing and sports engines. Robert M. Roof, the chief engineer for Laurel Motors, designed his multi-valve Roof Racing Overheads early in the 20th century. Type A 16-valve heads were successful in the teens, Type B was offered in 1918 and Type C 16-valve in 1923. Frank Lockhart drove a Type C overhead cam car to victory in Indiana in 1926.

Bugatti also had developed a 1.5-liter OHV straight-4 with four valves per cylinder as far back as 1914 but did not use this engine until after World War I. It produced appr. 30 bhp (22.4 kW) at 2700 rpm (15.4 kW/liter or 0.34 bhp/cid). In the 1920 Voiturettes Grand Prix at Le Mans driver Ernest Friderich finished first in a Bugatti Type 13 with the 16-valve engine, averaging 91.96 km/h. Even more successful was Bugattis clean sweep of the first four places at Brescia in 1921. In honour of this memorable victory all 16-valve-engined Bugattis were dubbed Brescia. From 1920 through 1926 about 2000 were built.

Peugeot had a triple overhead cam 5-valve Grand Prix car in 1921.

Bentley used multi-valve engines from the beginning. The Bentley 3 Litre, introduced in 1921, used a monobloc straight-4 with aluminium pistons, pent-roof combustion chambers, twin spark ignition, SOHC, and four valves per cylinder. It produced appr. 70 bhp (0.38 bhp per cubic inch). The 1927 Bentley 4½ Litre was of similar engine design. The NA racing model offered 130 bhp (0.48 bhp per cubic inch) and the 1929 supercharged 4½ Litre (Blower Bentley) reached 240 bhp (0.89 bhp per cubic inch). The 1926 Bentley 6½ Litre added two cylinders to the monobloc straight-4. This multi-valve straight-6 offered 180–200 bhp (0.45-0.50 bhp per cubic inch). The 1930 Bentley 8 Litre multi-valve straight-6 produced appr. 220 bhp (0.45 bhp per cubic inch).

In 1931 the Stutz Motor Company introduced a 322 cid (5.3-liter) dual camshaft 32-valve straight-8 with 156 bhp (116 kW) at 3900 rpm, called DV-32. The engine offered 0.48 bhp per cubic inch. About 100 of these multi-valve engines were built. Stutz also used them in their top-of-the-line sportscar, the DV-32 Super Bearcat that could reach 100 mph (160 km/h).

The 1935 Duesenberg SJ Mormon Meteor's engine was a 419.6 cid (6.9-liter) straight-8 with DOHC, 4 valves per cylinder and a supercharger. It achieved 400 bhp (298.3 kW) at 5,000 rpm and 0.95 bhp per cubic inch.

The 1937 Mercedes-Benz W125 racing car used a supercharged 5.7-liter straight-8 with DOHC and four valves per cylinder. The engine produced 592-646 bhp (441.5-475 kW) at 5800 rpm and achieved 1.71-1.87 bhp per cubic inch (77.8-85.1 kW/liter). The W125 top speed was appr. 200 mph (322 km/h).

=== After 1945 ===
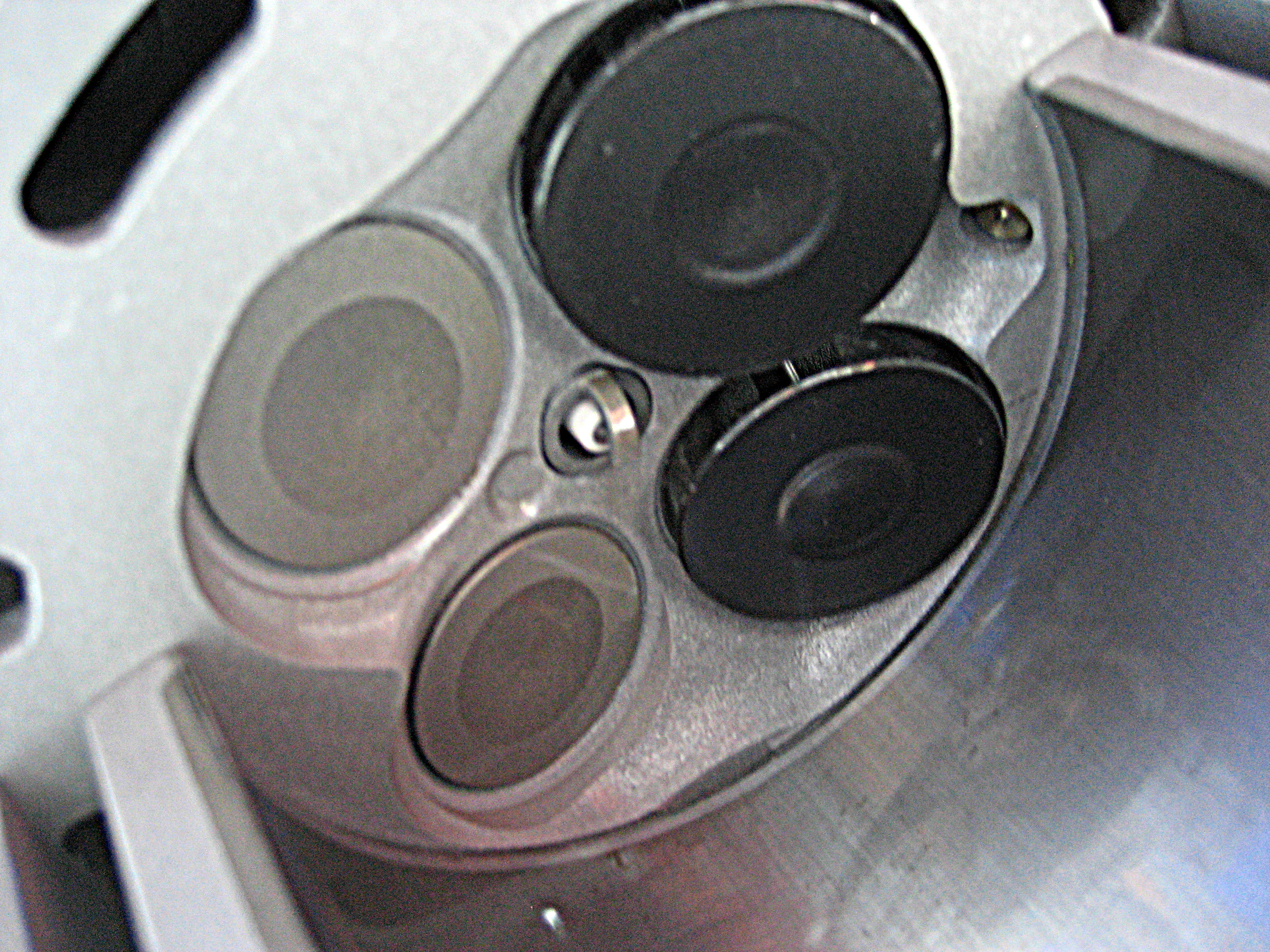
Combustion chamber of a 2009 Ford Ecoboost 3.5-liter turbocharged V6 petrol engine (77.8 kW/liter) showing two intake valves (right), two exhaust valves (left), centrally placed spark plug, and direct fuel injector (right).

The 1967 Cosworth DFV F1 engine, a NA 3.0-liter V8 producing appr. 400 bhp (298 kW; 406 PS) at 9,000 rpm (101.9 kW/liter), featured four valves per cylinder. For many years it was the dominant engine in Formula One, and it was also used in other categories, including CART, Formula 3000 and Sportscar racing.

Debuting at the 1968 Japanese Grand Prix in the original 300 PS (221 kW; 296 hp) 3.0-liter version the Toyota 7 engine participated in endurance races as a 5.0-liter (4,968 cc) non-turbo V8 with DOHC and 32-valves. It produced 600 PS (441 kW; 592 hp) at 8,000 rpm (88.8 kW/liter) and 55.0 kg⋅m (539 N⋅m; 398 lb⋅ft) at 6,400 rpm.

There is much discussion about which was the first 'mass-produced' car to use an engine with four valves per cylinder. For six-cylinder engines, and considering special versions of mass-produced cars, the first appears to have been the 1969 Nissan Skyline, using the Nissan S20 six-cylinder DOHC four-valve engine. This engine was also fitted to Nissan Fairlady Z432 racing edition.

For a four-cylinder engine, the first mass-produced car using a four valves per cylinder engine was the British Ford Escort RS1600, this car used the Cosworth BDA engine which was a Ford 'Kent' block with a Cosworth 16-valve twin-cam cylinder head. The car went on to become a rallying legend in the 1970s winning many domestic and World Championship events. Other cars claiming to be first are the Jensen Healey, launched in 1972 which used a Lotus 907 belt-driven DOHC 16-valve 2-liter straight-4 producing 140 bhp (54.6 kW/liter, 1.20 bhp/cid). All of these, although mass-produced, are also of relatively limited production, so it is argued that the first widely available and popularly priced mass-production car with a four valve per cylinder engine was the 1973 Triumph Dolomite Sprint. This Triumph used an in-house developed SOHC 16-valve 1,998 cc (122 ci) straight-4 engine that produced 127 bhp (47.6 kW/liter, 1.10 bhp/cid) at introduction.

The 1975 Chevrolet Cosworth Vega featured a DOHC multi-valve head designed by Cosworth Engineering in the UK. This 122-cubic-inch straight-4 produced 110 bhp (82 kW; 112 PS) at 5600 rpm (0.90 bhp/cid; 41.0 kW/liter) and 107 lb⋅ft (145 N⋅m) at 4800 rpm.

The 1976 Fiat 131 Abarth (51.6 kW/liter), 1976 Lotus Esprit with Lotus 907 engine (54.6 kW/liter, 1.20 bhp/cid), and 1978 BMW M1 with BMW M88 engine (58.7 kW/liter, 1.29 bhp/cid) all used four valves per cylinder. The BMW M88/3 engine was used in the 1983 BMW M635CSi and in the 1985 BMW M5.

The 1978 Porsche 935/78 racer used a twin turbo 3.2-liter flat-6 (845 bhp/630 kW at 8,200 rpm; 784 Nm/578 ft.lbs at 6,600 rpm). The water-cooled engine featured four valves per cylinder and output a massive 196.2 kW/liter. Porsche had to abandon its traditional aircooling because the multi-valve DOHC hampered aircooling of the spark plugs. Only two cars were built.

Ferrari developed their Quattrovalvole (or QV) engines in the 80s. Four valves per cylinder were added for the 1982 308 and Mondial Quattrovalvole, bringing power back up to the pre-FI high of 245 hp (183 kW) . A very unusual Dino Quattrovalvole was used in the 1986 Lancia Thema 8.32. It was based on the 308 QV's engine, but used a split-plane crankshaft rather than the Ferrari-type flat-plane. The engine was constructed by Ducati rather than Ferrari, and was produced from 1986 through 1991. The Quattrovalvole was also used by Lancia for their attempt at the World Sportscar Championship with the LC2. The engine was twin-turbocharged and destroked to 2.65 liters, but produced 720 hp (537 kW) in qualifying trim. The engine was later increased to 3.0 liters and increased power output to 828 hp (617 kW). The 1984 Ferrari Testarossa had a 4.9-liter flat-12 with four valves per cylinder. Almost 7,200 Testarossa were produced between 1984 and 1991.

In 1985 Lamborghini released a Countach Quattrovalvole, producing 455 PS (335 kW; 449 hp) from a 5.2-liter (5167 cc) Lamborghini V12 engine (64.8 kW/liter).

The Mercedes-Benz 190E 2.3-16 with 16-valve engine debuted at the Frankfurt Auto Show in September 1983 after it set a world record at Nardo, Italy, recording a combined average speed of 154.06 mph (247.94 km/h) over the 50,000 km (31,000 mi) endurance test. The engine was based on the 2.3-liter 8-valve 136 hp (101 kW) unit already fitted to the 190- and E-Class series. Cosworth developed the DOHC light alloy cast cylinder head with four large valves per cylinder. In roadgoing trim, the 190 E 2.3-16 produced 49 hp (36 kW) and 41 ft•lbf (55 N•m) of torque more than the basic single overhead cam 2.3 straight-4 engine on which it was based offering 185 hp (138 kW) at 6,200 rpm (59.2 kW/liter) and 174 lb⋅ft (236 N⋅m) at 4,500 rpm. In 1988 an enlarged 2.5-liter engine replaced the 2.3-liter. It offered double valve timing chains to fix the easily snapping single chains on early 2.3 engines, and increased peak output by 17 bhp (12.5 kW) with a slight increase in torque. For homologation Evolution I (1989) and Evolution II (1990) models were produced that had a redesigned engine to allow for a higher rev limit and improved top-end power capabilities. The Evo II engine offered 235 PS (173 kW; 232 hp) from 2463 cc (70.2 kW/liter).

Saab introduced a 16-valve head to their 2.0-liter (1985 cc) straight-4 in 1984 and offered the engine with and without turbocharger (65.5 kW/liter and 47.9 kW/liter respectively) in the Saab 900 and Saab 9000.

The 2.0-liter Nissan FJ20 was one of the earliest straight-4 mass-produced Japanese engines to have both a DOHC 16-valve configuration (four valves per cylinder, two intake, two exhaust) and electronic fuel injection (EFI) when released in October 1981 in the sixth generation Nissan Skyline. Peak output was 148 hp (110 kW) at 6,000 rpm and 133 lb⋅ft (180 N⋅m) at 4,800 rpm. The FJ20 was also offered with a turbocharger, producing 188 hp (140 kW) at 6,400 rpm and 166 lb⋅ft (225 N⋅m) at 4,800 rpm.

Following Nissan's lead, Toyota released the 1.6-liter (1,587 cc) 4A-GE engine in 1983. The cylinder head was developed by Yamaha Motor Corporation and was built at Toyota's Shimayama plant. While originally conceived of as a two-valve design, Toyota and Yamaha changed the 4A-GE to a four-valve after a year of evaluation. It produced 115-140 bhp (86-104 kW) at 6,600 rpm (54.2-65.5 kW/liter) and 109 lb⋅ft (148 N⋅m) at 5,800 rpm. To compensate for the reduced air speed of a multi-valve engine at low rpms, the first-to-second generation engines included the T-VIS intake system.

In 1986 Volkswagen introduced a multi-valved Golf GTI 16V. The 16-valve 1.8-liter straight-4 produced 139 PS (102 kW; 137 bhp) or 56.7 kW/liter, almost 25% up from the 45.6 kW/liter for the previous 8-valve Golf GTI engine.

The GM Quad 4 multi-valve engine family debuted early 1987. The Quad 4 was the first mainstream multi-valve engine to be produced by GM after the Chevrolet Cosworth Vega. The NA Quad 4 achieved 1.08 bhp (1 kW; 1 PS) per cubic inch (49.1 kW/liter). Such engines soon became common as Japanese manufacturers adopted the multi-valve concept.

==== Three valves ====
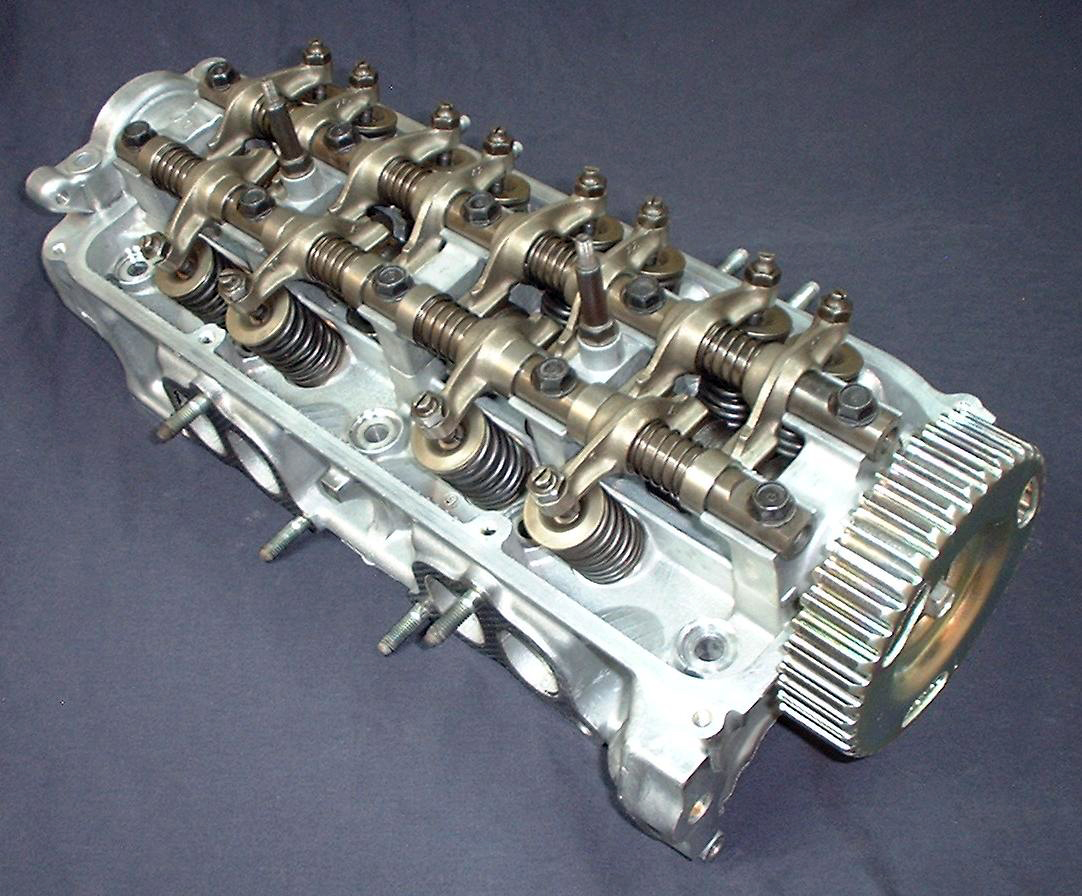
A cylinder head from a 1987 Honda CRX Si showing SOHC, rocker arms, valve springs, and other components. This is a multi-valve configuration with two intake valves and one exhaust valve for each cylinder.

The 1975 Honda Civic introduced Honda's 1.5-liter SOHC 12-valve straight-4 engines with 3 valves per cylinder. The Maserati Biturbo, introduced in 1981, also featured a 3 valves per cylinder design for most of its production, before being upgraded to 4. Nissan's 1988–1992 SOHC KA24E engine had three valves per cylinder (two intakes, one exhaust) as well. Nissan upgraded to DOHC after 1992 for some of their sports cars, including the 240SX. Toyota also produced 3-valve engines such as the SOHC E series used in some models of the Tercel and Starlet.

In 1988, Renault released a 12-valve version of its Douvrin 4-cylinder 2.0-liter SOHC.

Mercedes and Ford produced three-valve V6 and V8 engines, Ford claiming an 80% improvement in high rpm breathing without the added cost of a DOHC valve train. The Ford design uses one spark plug per cylinder located in the centre, but the Mercedes design uses two spark plugs per cylinder located on opposite sides, leaving the centre free to add a direct-to-cylinder fuel injector at a later date.

The 1989 Citroën XM was the first 3-valve diesel-engined car.

==== Four valves ====
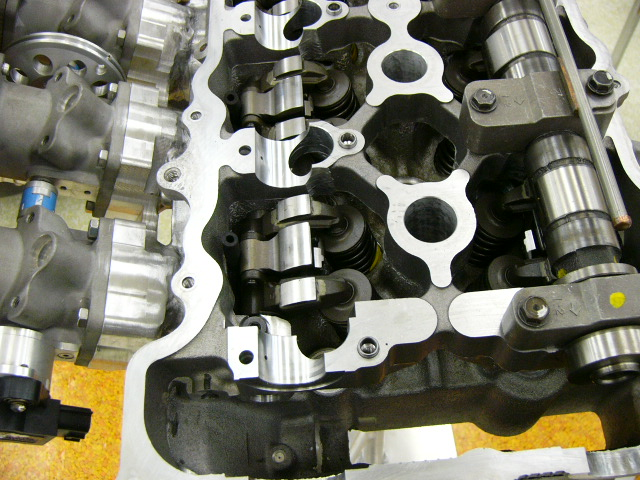
Nissan SR20VE 2.0-liter straight-4-cylinder head with DOHC, Nissan's Neo VVL variable valve timing with lift control and four valves per cylinder.

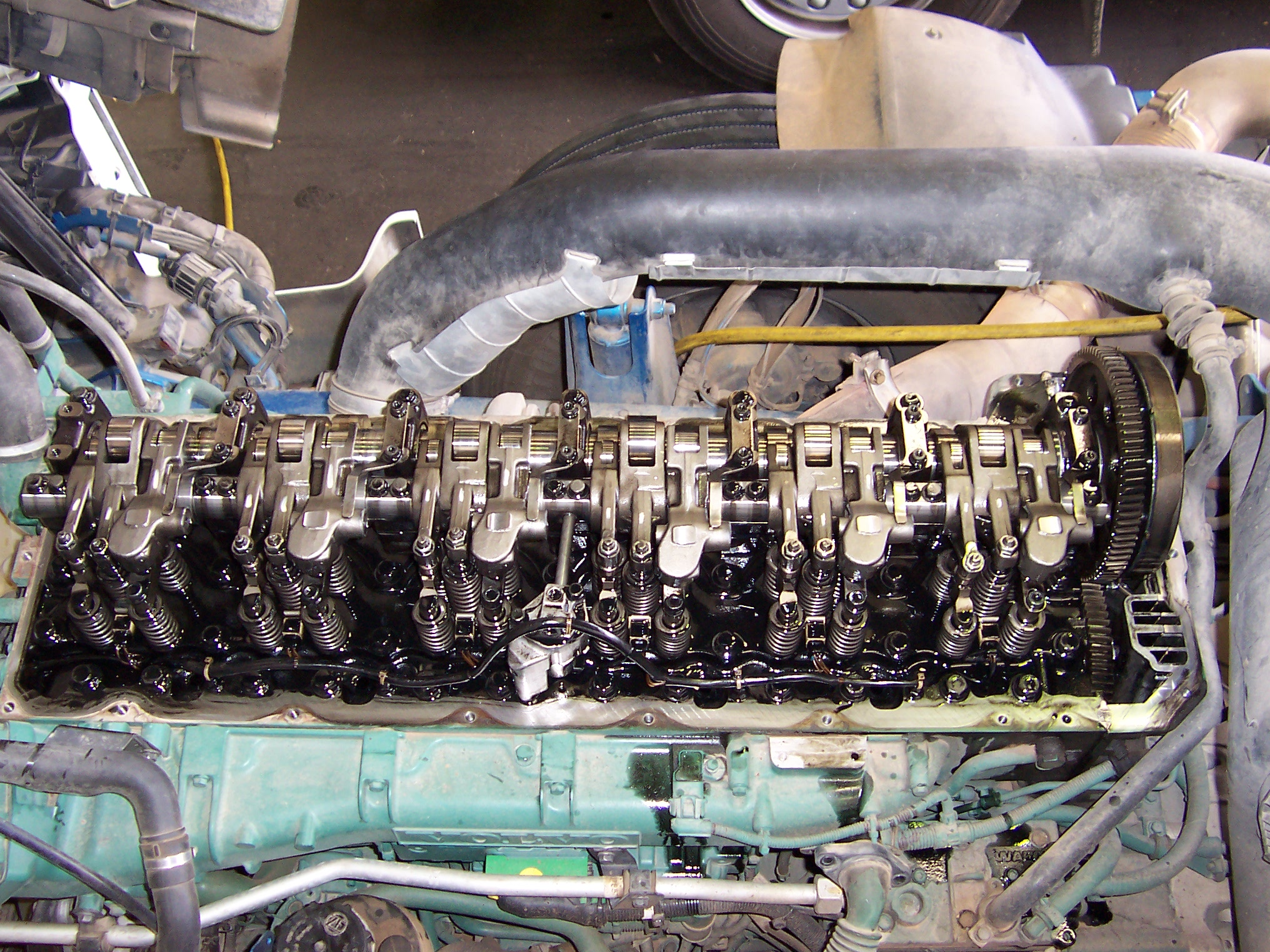
Multi-valve train of Volvo's 2005 truck diesel engine D13A, a 12.8-liter turbocharged straight-6 (21.1-28.1 kW/liter) with SOHC and four valves per cylinder located around a central injector, and VEB engine brake that operates both exhaust valves.

Examples of SOHC four-valve engines include the Triumph Sprint engine, the Honda F-series engines, D-series engines, all J-series engines, the R-series engines, the Mazda B8-ME, and the Chrysler 3.5 L V6 engine.

The V12 engines of many World War II fighter aircraft also used a SOHC configuration with four valves for each cylinder.

The 1993 Mercedes-Benz C-Class (OM604 engine) was the first 4-valve diesel-engined car.

==== Five valves ====
Peugeot had a triple overhead cam five-valve Grand Prix car in 1921.

In April 1988 an Audi 200 Turbo Quattro powered by an experimental 2.2-liter turbocharged 25-valve straight-5 rated at 440 kW (600 PS) at 6,200 rpm (217 kW/liter) set two world speed records at Nardo, Italy: 326.4 km/h (202.8 mph) for 1,005 km (625 miles) and 324.4 km/h (201.6 mph) for 800 km (500 miles).

Mitsubishi were the first to market a car engine with five valves per cylinder, with the 548 cc 3G81 engine in their Minica Dangan ZZ kei car in 1989.

Yamaha designed the five-valve cylinder head for the 20-valve 4A-GE engines made by Toyota for use in some Toyota Corolla models in Japan and South Africa, in 1991. Yamaha also developed five-valve Formula One engines, the 1989 OX88 V8, 1991 OX99 V12, 1993 OX10 V10 and 1996 OX11 V10, but none of these were very successful. For their YZ250F and YZ450F motocross bikes, Yamaha developed five-valve engines.

Bugatti (EB 110), Ferrari (F355, 360 and F50), Volkswagen - Audi (Audi Quattro) - Skoda (Octavia vRS) and Toyota (4A-GE 20V) have all produced five-valve-engined vehicles.

==== Six valves ====
In 1985, Maserati made an experimental 2.0-liter turbo V6 engine with six valves per cylinder (three intakes, three exhaust). It achieved 261 bhp (195 kW; 265 PS) at 7,200 rpm (97.5 kW/liter).

==== Pushrod ====
Although most multi-valve engines have overhead camshafts, either SOHC or DOHC, a multivalve engine may be a pushrod overhead valve engine (OHV) design. GM has revealed a three-valve version of its Generation IV V8 which uses pushrods to actuate forked rockers, and all Duramax V8 engines have four valves per cylinder with pushrods. Moreover, Cummins makes a four-valve OHV straight six diesel, the Cummins B Series (now known as ISB). Ford also uses pushrods in its 6.7L Power Stroke engine using four pushrods, four rockers and four valves per cylinder. The 6.0 and 6.4 Powerstroke engine built by Navistar also used pushrods with four-valve heads. Pushrod multi-valve systems are common on diesels because they need to be able to meet emissions standards, but also produce more low-end torque. The Harley-Davidson Milwaukee Eight engine, introduced in 2016, uses four-valves per cylinder driven by pushrods and a single in-block camshaft.

==== Turbocharged ====
The 1980 Lotus Essex Turbo Esprit (with type 910 2.2-liter inline four engine) was the first production car to use a multi-valve turbocharged engine.

== Motorcycles ==
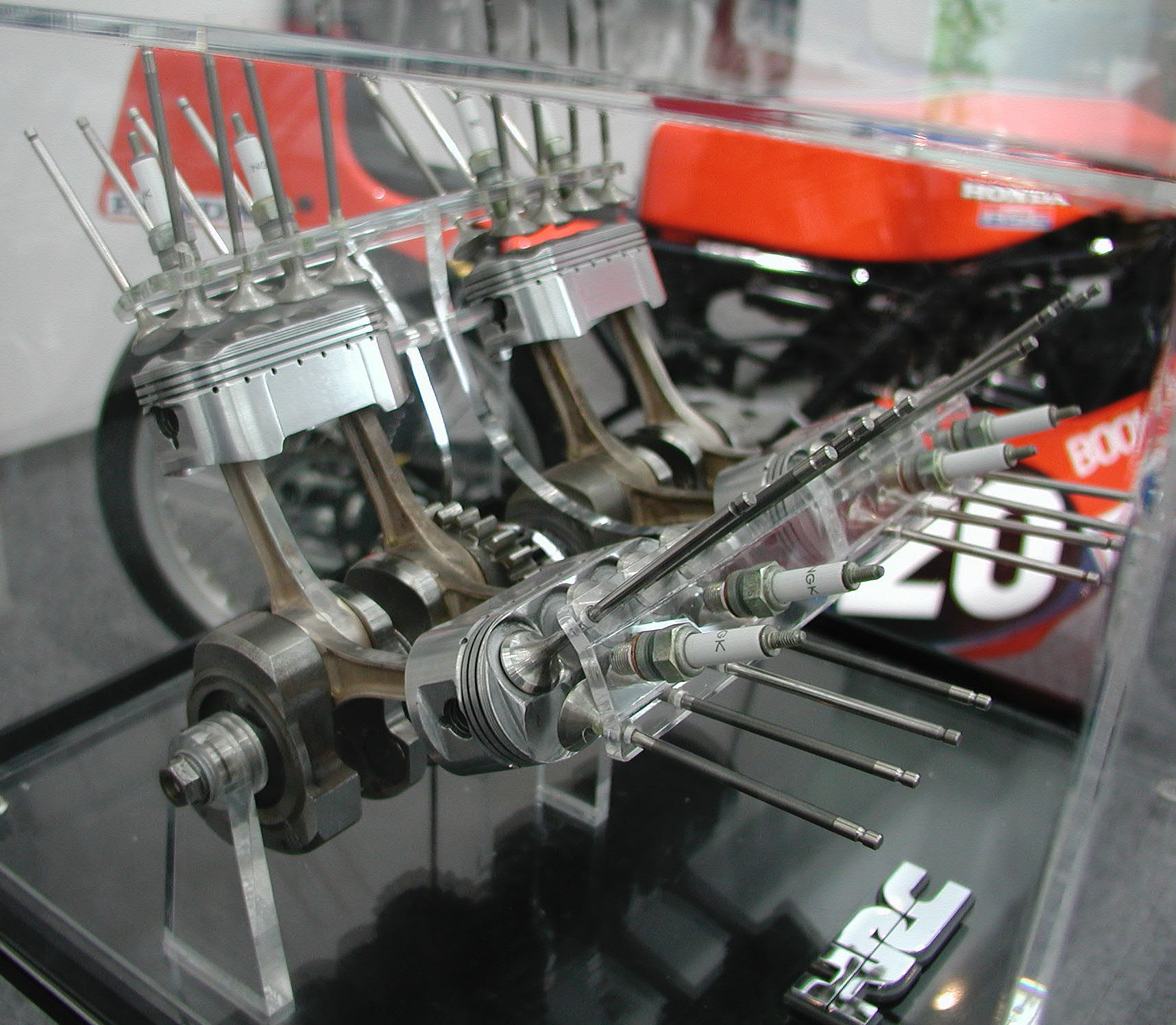
Rare 8-valve-per-cylinder arrangement of 1979 Honda NR500 V4 GP motorcycle engine with oval pistons and dual piston rods. The DOHC 500 cc engine delivered over 115 PS at 19,000 rpm (170 kW/liter).

Examples of motorcycles with multivalve-engines include:

- 1914 Peugeot Grand Prix racer, 500 cc DOHC 8-valve parallel twin (top speed over 122 km/h).
- 1915 Indian board track racer, 61-cid (1.0-liter) OHV 8-valve V-twin.
- 1921 Triumph Ricardo 499 cc OHV 4-valve single-cylinder machine, copied by Rudge-Whitworth with their 1924 Rudge Four 350 cc OHV 4-valve single-cylinder machine, and 1929 Rudge Ulster 500 cc OHV 4-valve single-cylinder machine.
- 1923 British Anzani 1098cc OHV 8-Valve V-twin, used in Morgan three-wheelers and McEvoy motorcycles
- 1972 Honda XL250 "pent-roof" SOHC 4-valve single-cylinder machine (the first mass-produced 4-valve motorcycle).
- 1973 Yamaha TX500 "pent-roof" 500cc DOHC 8-valve parallel-twin (the first mass-produced DOHC 4-valve per cylinder motorcycle)
- 1977 Honda CB400 SOHC 6-valve parallel-twin.
- 1978 Honda CX500, a 498 cc SOHC, pushrod actuated OHV, 4-valve per cylinder V-twin; 1982 CX500 Turbo was the first factory multi-valve turbocharged motorcycle.
- 1978 Honda CBX1000, a 1,047 cc DOHC 24-valve straight-6 (105 bhp (78 kW; 106 PS)).
- 1979–1992: Honda NR series, racing & production motorcycles with 8-valve-per-cylinder "oval-piston" V4 engines (actually 32-valve V8s with adjoining cylinders merged).
- 1985 Yamaha FZ750 motorcycle with DOHC 20-valve straight-4 Yamaha "Genesis" engine.
- 1991–2010 Yamaha TDM and TRX parallel twin motorcycles with 5 valves per cylinder
- 1998–2006 Yamaha YZF-R1 superbike with redesigned (more compact) "Genesis" engine. 2006 model delivered 180 bhp (134 kW; 182 PS) at 12,500 rpm (130.3 kW/liter).

The Aprilia Pegaso 650 single also started out with five valves, but current models only have four. The jointly developed BMW F650 single always had four valves.

== Aircraft ==
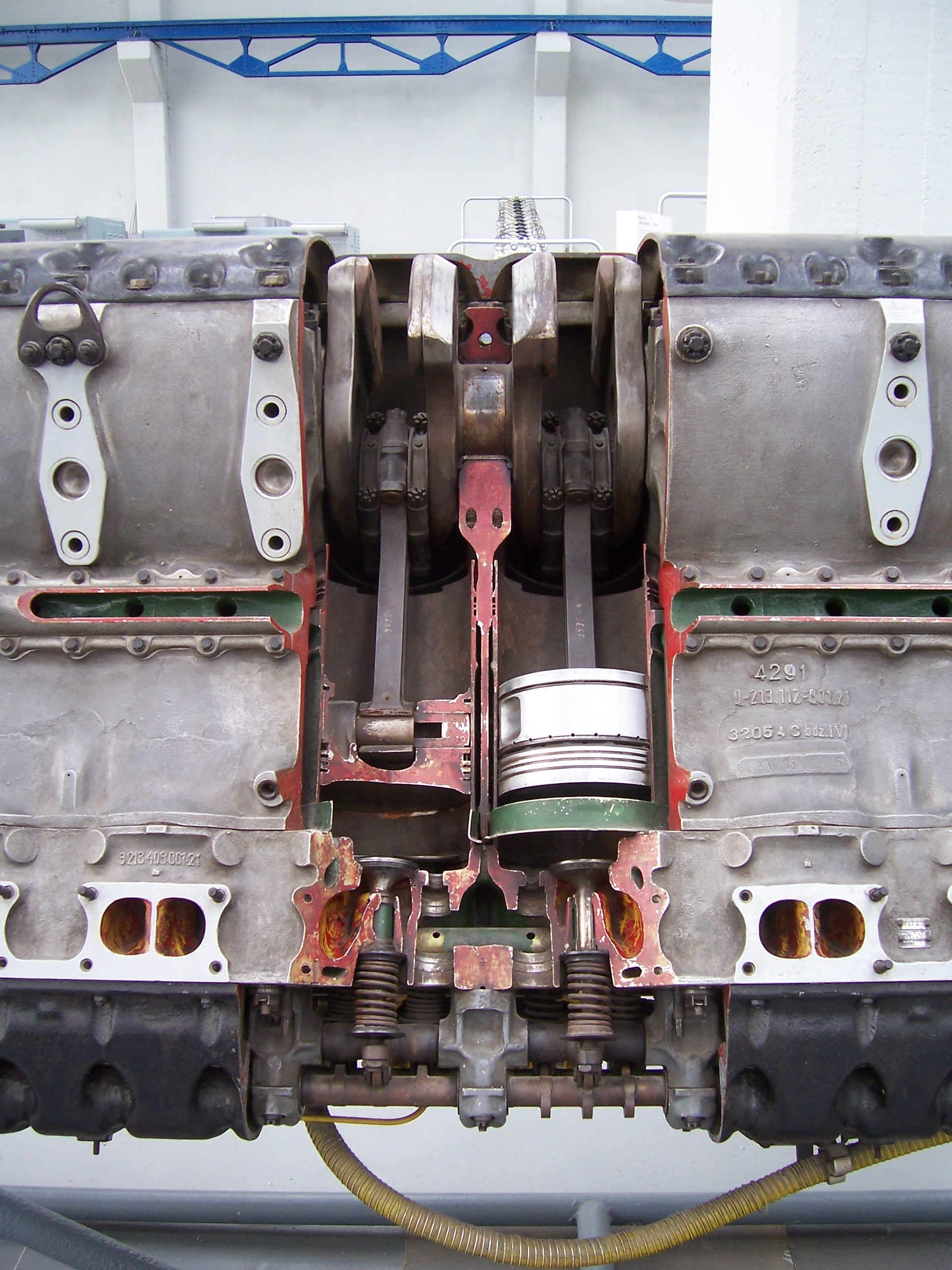
Sectioned Junkers Jumo 213, showing three-valve design

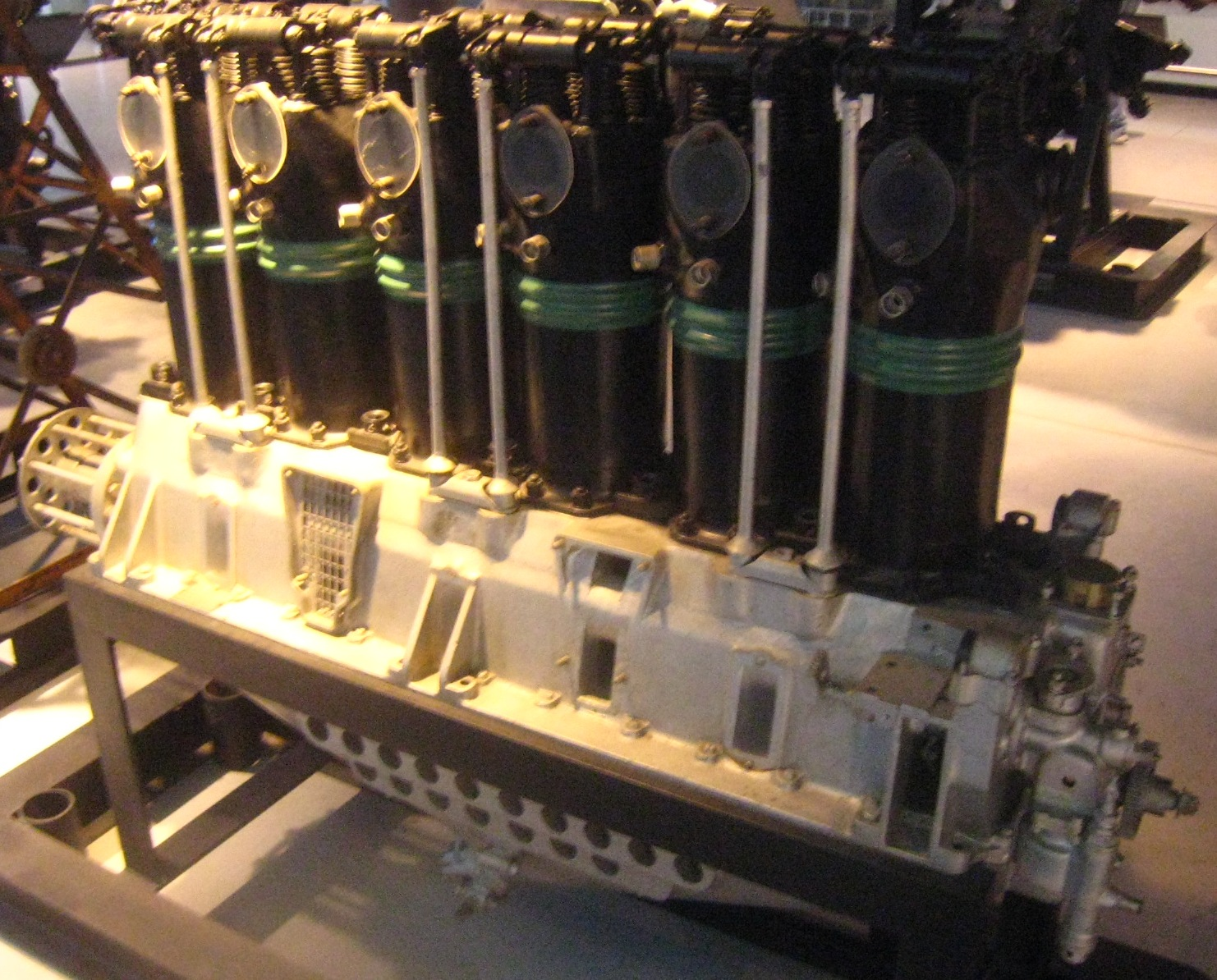
1916 Benz Bz.IV 19-liter water-cooled straight-6 aircraft engine with aluminium pistons, dual camshaft and four valves per cylinder achieved 230 bhp/170 kW at 1,400 rpm (9.0 kW/liter). Appr. 6,400 engines were produced.

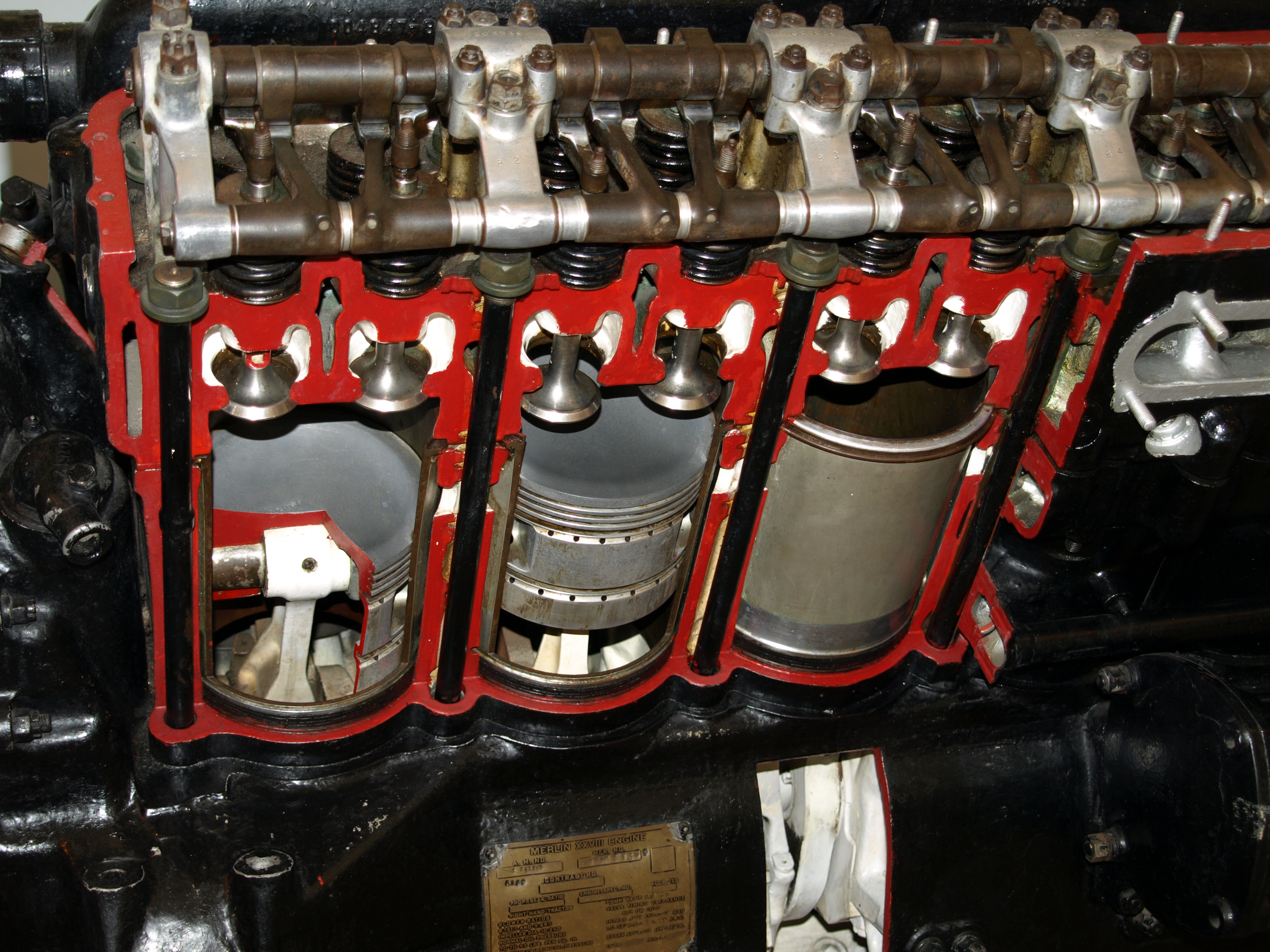
Cutaway view of 1941 Packard Merlin 28 V12 aircraft engine showing SOHC and four valves per cylinder. This widely used supercharged WWII engine produced 1,390 bhp (1,037 kW; 1,409 PS) from 1,649 cid (38.5 kW/liter).

Ettore Bugatti designed several multi-valve aircraft engines. The 1916 Bugatti U-16 1484.3 cid (24.32 L) SOHC 16-cylinder, consisting of two parallel 8-cylinder banks, offered 410 bhp (305 kW) at 2,000 rpm (12.5 kW/liter or 0.28 bhp/cid). Each cylinder had two vertical inlet valves and a single vertical exhaust valve, all driven by rocking levers from the camshaft. Other advanced World War I aircraft engines, such as the 1916 Maybach Mb.IVa that produced 300 bhp (224 kW; 304 PS) at altitude and the 1916 Benz Bz.IV with aluminium pistons and the 1918 Napier Lion (a 450 bhp 24-liter DOHC 12-cylinder), used two intake valves and two exhaust valves.

Long after the King-Bugatti "U-16" aviation engine used them, shortly before World War II, the Junkers aviation firm began production of the Third Reich's most-produced military aviation engine (68,000+ produced), the 1936-designed, 35-liter displacement, inverted-V12, liquid-cooled Junkers Jumo 211, which used a three-valve cylinder head design inherited from Junkers' first inverted V12 design, the 1932-origin Junkers Jumo 210 — this was carried through into the later, more powerful 1940-origin Junkers Jumo 213, produced through 1945, the production versions of which (the Jumo 213A and -E subtypes) retained the Jumo 211's three-valve cylinder head design.

The V12 engines of many World War II fighter aircraft used a SOHC configuration with four valves for each cylinder.

An example of a modern multi-valve piston-engine for small aircraft is the Austro Engine AE300. This liquid-cooled turbocharged 2.0-liter (1,991 cc) DOHC 16-valve straight-4 diesel engine uses common rail direct fuel injection and delivers 168 bhp (125 kW; 170 PS) at 3,880 rpm (62.0 kW/liter). The propeller is driven by an integrated gearbox (ratio 1.69:1) with torsional vibration damper. Total power unit weight is 185 kg (408 lb).

== Boats ==
In 1905 car builder Delahaye had experimented with a DOHC marine racing engine with 6 valves per cylinder. This Delahaye Titan engine was a massive 62.2 L (3,800 cu in) four-cylinder that produced 300 bhp (0.07 bhp/cid). It allowed the motor boat Le Dubonnet piloted by Emile Dubonnet to set a new world's speed record on water, reaching 33.80 mph (54.40 km/h) on the lake at Juvisy, near Paris, France.

An example of modern multi-valve engines for small boats is the Volvo Penta IPS Series. These joystick-operated seawater-cooled inboard diesel engines use combined charging (turbo and supercharger, except IPS450) with aftercooler, common rail fuel injection and DOHCs with hydraulic 4-valve technology. Propshaft power ranges from 248 to 850 bhp (185 to 634 kW; 251 to 862 PS) (highest efficiency 59.7 kW/liter for IPS400 3.7-liter straight-4 diesel). Multiple units can be combined.
