= Yamaha OX77 engine =

Yamaha OX77
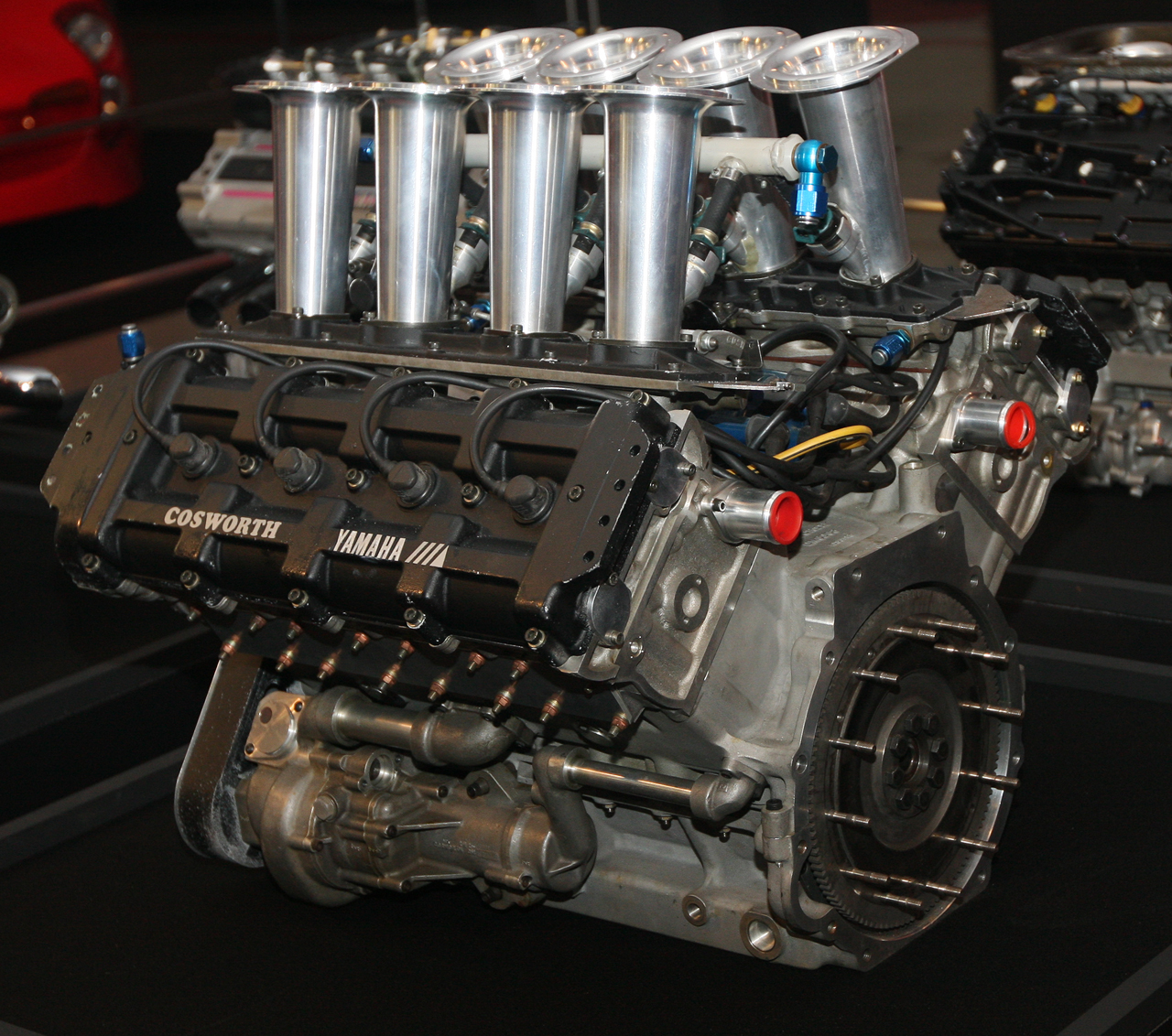

Overview
- Manufacturer: Yamaha
- Production: 1987–1988

Layout
- Configuration: 90° V8
- Displacement: 2,997 cc (3 L; 183 cu in)
- Cylinder bore: 85.67 mm (3.37 in)
- Piston stroke: 64.9 mm (2.56 in)
- Cylinder block material: Aluminum alloy
- Cylinder head material: Aluminum alloy
- Valvetrain: 5-valve DOHC

Combustion
- Fuel type: Gasoline
- Oil system: Dry sump
- Cooling system: Single water pump

Output
- Power output: ~450 hp (336 kW)
- Torque output: ~260 lb⋅ft (353 N⋅m)

Chronology
- Predecessor: Yamaha OX66
- Successor: Yamaha OX88

The Yamaha OX77 is a naturally aspirated gasoline-powered 3.0 L (180 cu in) V8 racing engine, developed and built by Yamaha for Formula 3000, specifically the Japanese Formula 3000 Championship, between 1987 and 1988. It is derived from the Cosworth DFV engine, but uses 5 valves per cylinder instead of the DFV's 4.

This engine notably won the 1988 Japanese Formula 3000 Championship, being driven by Aguri Suzuki.
