= Yamaha Genesis engine =

Motorcycle engine

"Genesis" is Yamaha's marketing name for a range of innovative, high-performance multi-valve four-stroke motorcycle engines. The flexible design of the engine allowed Yamaha to use it on a variety of configurations, from sport bikes to outboard engines.

== The five-valve engine ==
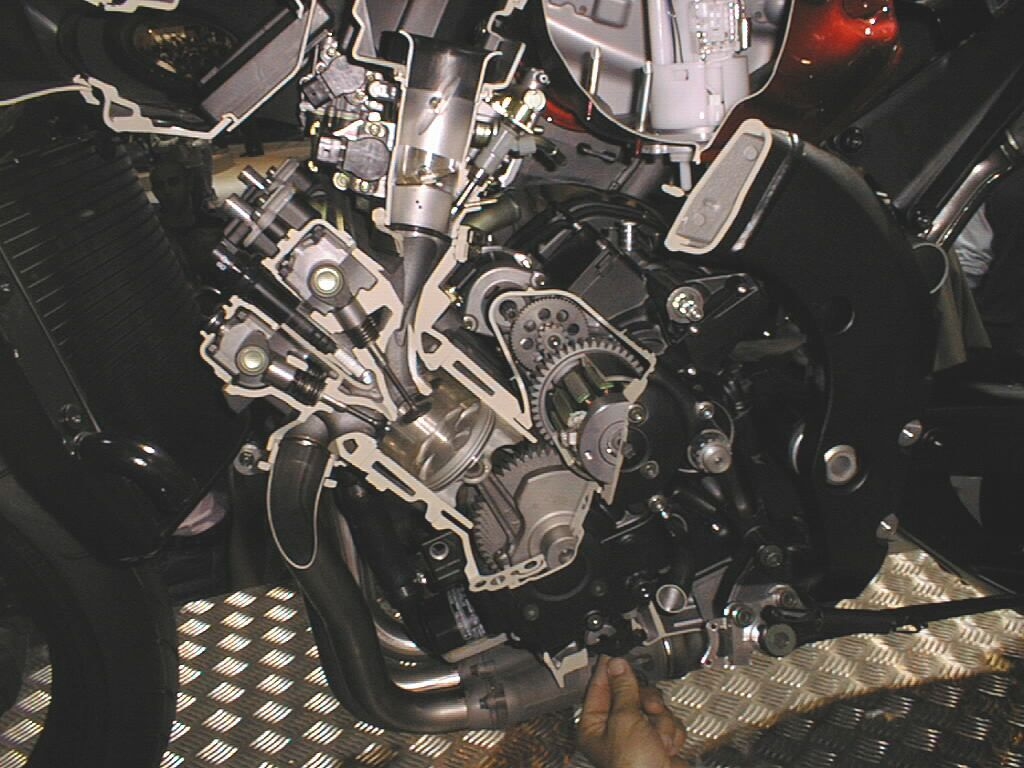
"Cutaway of Yamaha Genesis inline-four 20-valve engine"

The DOHC Genesis engine has five valves per cylinder and downdraft carburetors. Yamaha adopted the 5-valve concept, using three intake valves and two exhaust valves per cylinder, because it allowed both excellent volumetric efficiency and high RPM. As designers began to appreciate the benefits of multi-valve layout, 4-valves-per-cylinder (and even 3-valves) became common. In a multivalve engine, maximum RPM is limited by the size of the largest valves: in a 3-valver, the exhaust valve is larger, and in a 4-valver, the inlet valves are larger. The significance of the five-valve engine compared to other multivalve configurations engines is that, like a 3-valver, there were more intake valves than exhaust valves, yet all valves were small and of very similar sizes and weights.

Downdraft carburetors were adopted for improved gas flow, but, for motorcycles, a perceived disadvantage was that the intake airbox was above the engine, taking up space from the fuel tank, rather than being sited conventionally behind the engine. However, this apparent disadvantage was an advantage as it allowed for pressurization of the airbox. Also, Yamaha dealt with this apparent loss of fuel tank volume by building the tank lower and using an electric fuel pump to pump fuel to the bank of carburetors above. A deeper fuel tank also gave a small advantage as it centralized weight and moved the CoG lower.

What could be argued is that the Genesis concept (not just the inclination of the engine, although on the FZ750 was a radical 45 degrees, on the FZR1000 a less radical 35 degrees, a feature now generally universally used in the modern (post 1990) sport bike thus allowing downdraft air induction and airbox pressurization, but also the use of beam frames as opposed to spine or perimeter frames previously commonly used) set the architecture for the modern sport bike.

== Applications ==
The Genesis engine first appeared on the 1985 Yamaha FZ750 and was later used on a variety of motorcycles for different kinds of markets. The design was used for parallel-twins (such as the TDM and the TRX) as well as for four-cylinder models. Both fours and twins had the cylinder block slanted forwards 45 degrees. The Genesis engine was also used in the Yamaha YZF-R1, FZX700, FZ750, and the USA-only FZ700.

Other applications ranged from the Supersport YZF-R6 and YZF-R1 models, using electronic fuel injection with YCCT and YCCI, to the less extreme but still powerful Yamaha FZ6 (4 valve per cylinder) and FZ1 Fazer line, which had a simpler fuel injection design but was the same basic engine design. The most significant changes made were the 4-valve per cylinder configuration and the crossplane crankshaft found on the YZF-R1 in 2009, along with the change of cylinder sleeves to steel for high precision and high temperature durability. Throughout its long period of production, the Genesis range has successfully provided performance and reliability.

Because of its high performance capacity (usually from 100 BHP - 350 BHP), the engine has also been employed in various other uses such as gyroplanes and high power marine engines, making it an affordable solution for high performance applications. The engine is also used in a racecar championship in Norway called SevenRacing. It is a copy of Lotus Super Seven, and is produced by MK and Stuart Taylor.
