= Alexander Wurz =

Austrian racing driver (born 1974)

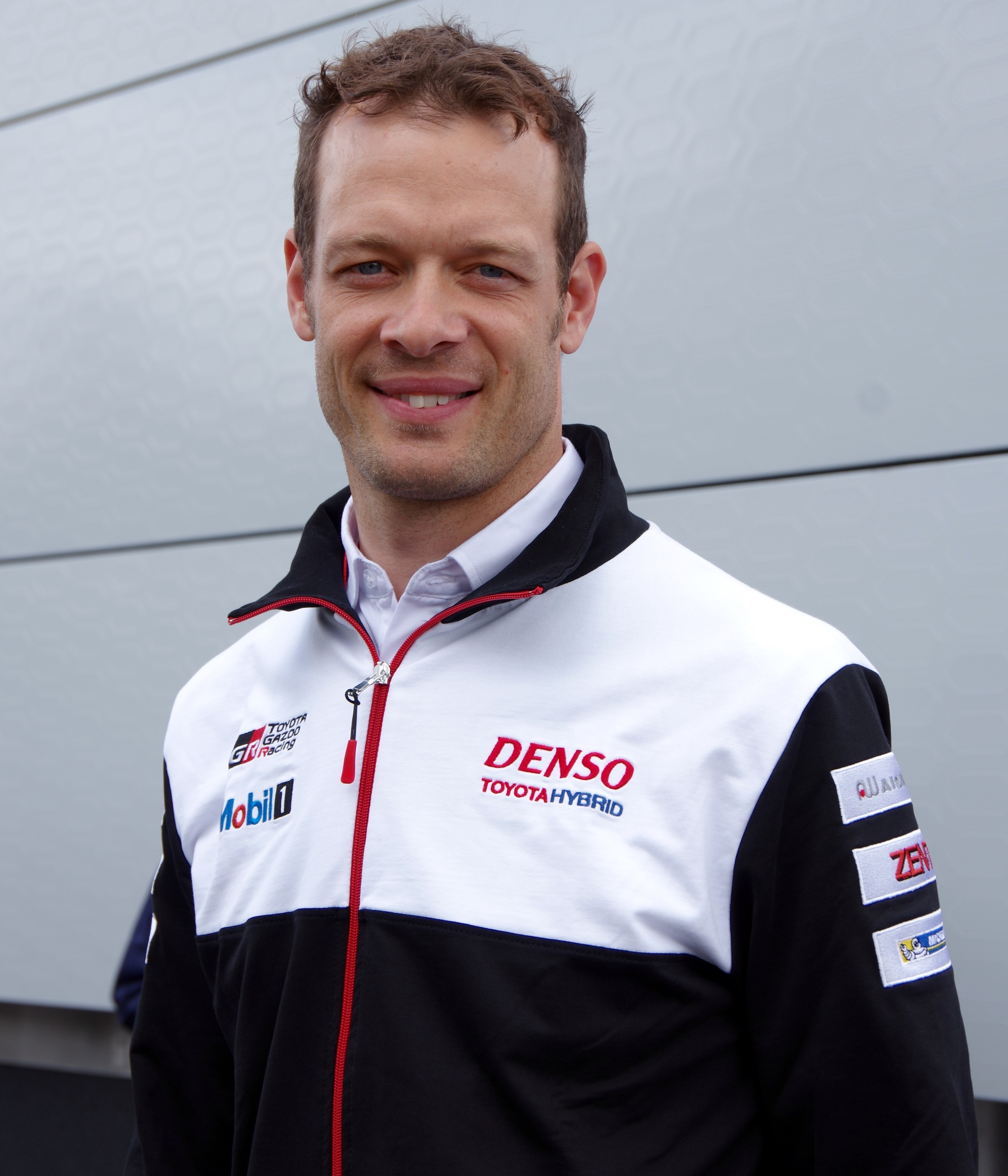
- Wurz at the 2016 24 Hours of Le Mans
- Born: Alexander Georg Wurz; 15 February 1974 (age 52); Waidhofen an der Thaya, Lower Austria, Austria
- Spouse: Julia Horden (m. 2002)
- Children: 3, including Charlie and Oscar
- Awards: 1999 Lorenzo Bandini Trophy

Formula One World Championship career
- Nationality: (Austria) Austrian
- Active years: 1997–2000, 2005, 2007
- Team(s): Benetton, McLaren, Williams
- Entries: 69
- Championships: 0
- Wins: 0
- Podiums: 3
- Career points: 45
- Pole positions: 0
- Fastest laps: 1
- First entry: 1997 Canadian Grand Prix
- Last entry: 2007 Chinese Grand Prix

FIA World Endurance Championship career
- Categorisation: FIA Platinum
- Years active: 2012–2015
- Teams: Toyota
- Starts: 28
- Championships: 0
- Wins: 5
- Podiums: 12
- Poles: 8
- Best finish: 3rd in 2012 (LMP1)

24 Hours of Le Mans career
- Years: 1996, 2008–2015
- Teams: Joest, Peugeot, Toyota
- Best finish: 1st (1996, 2009)
- Class wins: 2 (1996, 2009)

Alexander Georg Wurz (German pronunciation: [ˌalɛˈksandɐ ˈɡeː.ɐ̯k vʊʁt͡s]; born 15 February 1974) is an Austrian former racing driver, motorsport executive and businessman, who competed in Formula One between 1997 and 2007. (Note: The exact years Wurz competed in Formula One: 1997–2000, 2005, 2007.) In endurance racing, Wurz is a two-time winner of the 24 Hours of Le Mans in 1996 and 2009 with Joest and Peugeot, respectively.

Amongst several test driver roles, Wurz competed at 69 Grands Prix across six seasons with Benetton, McLaren, and Williams; he achieved three podiums. Since his retirement, he has been a commentator for television, as well as chairman of the Grand Prix Drivers' Association. and occasionally a driver steward.

== Early life ==
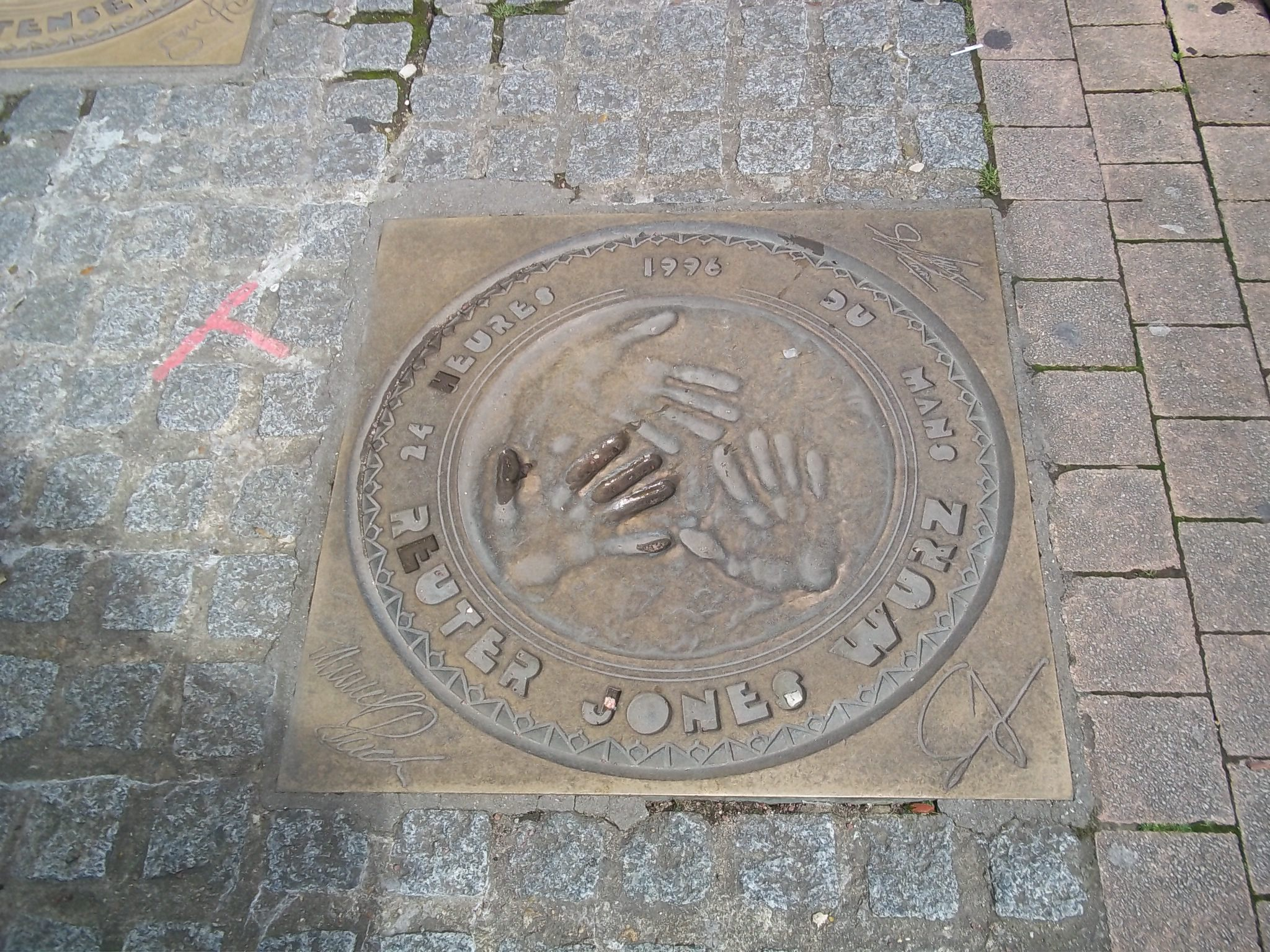
Walk of Fame – Le Mans, Handprints and signatures from the winners of the 1996 edition of the 24 Hours of Le Mans

Alexander Georg Wurz was born on 15 February 1974 in Waidhofen an der Thaya, Lower Austria. He is the second son of former rallycross driver Franz Wurz, who won the European Rallycross Championship in 1974, 1976 and 1982. Wurz competed in cycling events in his youth, and won the BMX World Championship in 1986 at the age of 12.

== Junior racing career ==
Like most Formula One drivers, Wurz's motorsport career began with karting. In 1991, Wurz drove in Formula Ford. In 1993, he switched to the German Formula Three Championship. During his time in Formula 3, Wurz crashed out of the lead at a race at AVUS in 1995 after a collision with the safety car. From 1996, Wurz drove an Opel Calibra for the Joest Racing touring car team in the DTM. Also in 1996, Wurz, together with Davy Jones and Manuel Reuter, won the Le Mans 24 Hours and in so doing became the youngest ever winner of the 24-hour race, a record he still holds.

== Formula One career ==
=== Benetton (1997–2000) ===
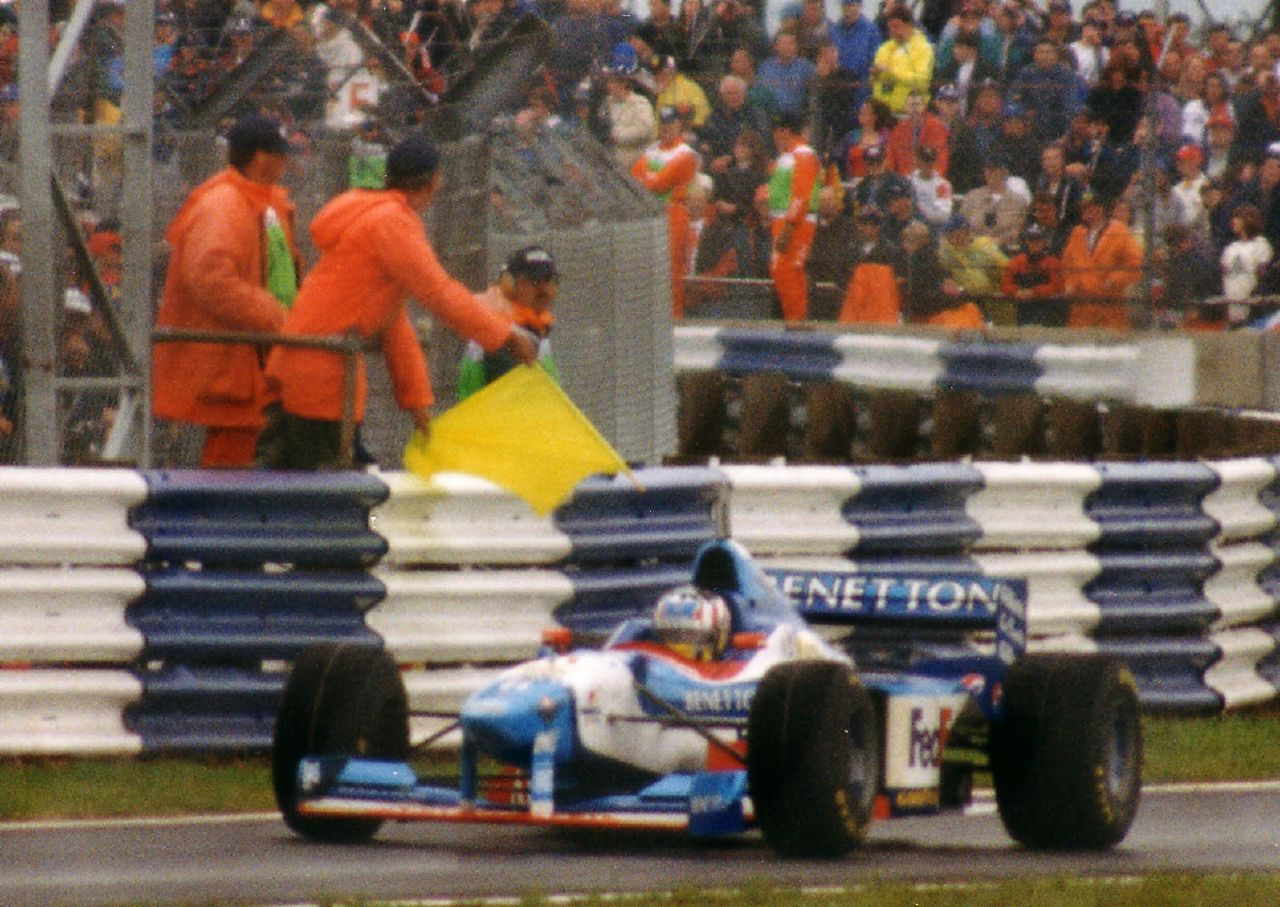
Wurz at the 1997 British Grand Prix at Silverstone.

Wurz's Formula One debut was on 15 June 1997 at Montreal for Benetton filling in for fellow Austrian Gerhard Berger, who could not race due to illness. Wurz achieved a podium position in his third race (1997 British Grand Prix) before returning to being a test driver upon Berger's return to the cockpit at the German Grand Prix, which Berger won.

Wurz was given a full-time race seat for the 1998 season with Benetton and spent three more seasons at the team, partnered each year by Giancarlo Fisichella. In 1998, he outscored Fisichella by one point to finish joint seventh in the driver's championship together with Heinz-Harald Frentzen. At the 1998 Monaco Grand Prix, he was running second ahead of Michael Schumacher for a brief period, but his hopes of a podium finish were ruined when Schumacher collided with him when tried to pass at Loews hairpin. The collision broke his suspension, causing him to spin off and crash at the Nouvelle Chicane exiting the tunnel.

The 1999 season was a disappointment for both drivers with the uncompetitive B199 (although Fisichella scored a podium in Canada). In the 2000 season, Wurz scored points only at the Italian Grand Prix, while Fisichella scored podium finishes three times. For 2001, Benetton's last season before its transformation into Renault, he was replaced with Jenson Button.

=== McLaren test driver (2001–2005) ===
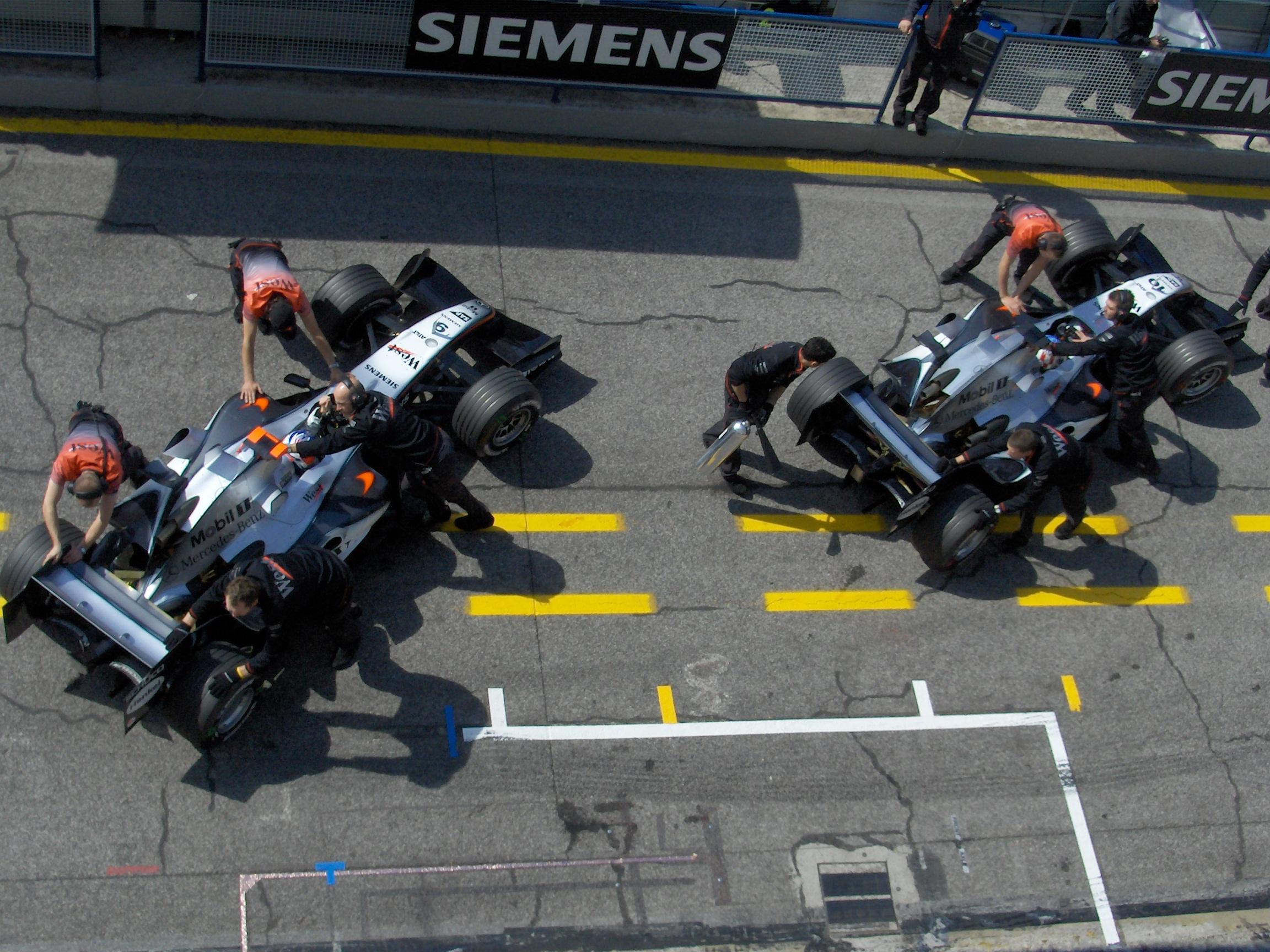
Wurz (right) was a test driver for McLaren from 2001 to 2005, competing for the team once at the 2005 San Marino Grand Prix.

In 2001, Wurz was a test driver for McLaren. In 2002, he was almost promoted as race driver to replace Mika Häkkinen, but he remained as test driver after Kimi Räikkönen took over.

In April 2005, with Juan Pablo Montoya injured, Wurz drove for McLaren in the 2005 San Marino Grand Prix, finishing fourth in the race, but taking third place after both BAR-Honda drivers were disqualified. This gave him the record for the longest interval between podium finishes at eight years.

Since signing to McLaren as test driver, Wurz had been eager to return to racing. At various times, rumours linked him to a return to a full race seat. In 2003 he was strongly linked to a race seat at Jaguar, where the under-fire Antônio Pizzonia was struggling. However, McLaren were struggling with their abortive new car and blocked the move to retain Wurz as a development driver. Jaguar then decided to give Pizzonia more time to prove himself, before drafting in Justin Wilson.

=== Williams (2006–2007) ===
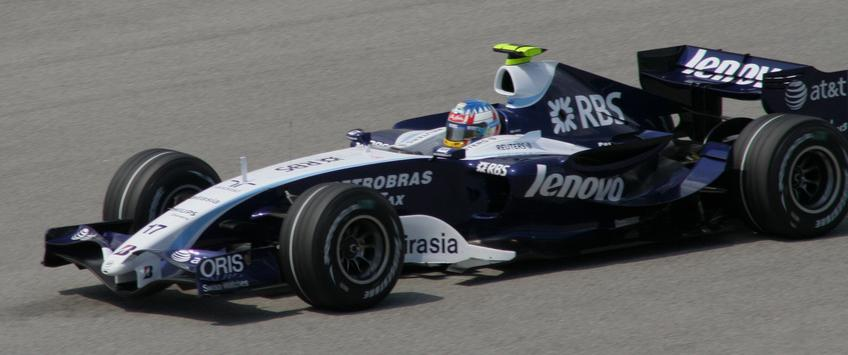
Wurz at the 2007 Malaysian Grand Prix.

Wurz signed a deal with WilliamsF1 to become the team's official test and reserve driver at the beginning of 2006. He drove the third car at all Friday sessions in 2006. It was announced on 3 August 2006 that Wurz would replace Mark Webber as a race driver at Williams for the 2007 season. This was Wurz's first full-time race drive since 2000, and his teammate was Nico Rosberg. At the Monaco GP on 27 May 2007, Wurz scored his first points for Williams, finishing in seventh place after qualifying 11th. He came third for the third time in his F1 career at the Canadian Grand Prix on 10 June 2007, having started 19th on the grid in an action packed race. He nearly repeated this at the European Grand Prix, but was unable to overtake Mark Webber at the final chicane. That race turned out to be Wurz's last points finish. On 8 October 2007, he announced his immediate retirement from Formula One, meaning that the 2007 Chinese Grand Prix was his final race. He cited doubts over his own commitment as the main reason for his departure. He was replaced by Williams test driver Kazuki Nakajima for the final race of the 2007 season in Brazil.

=== Honda / Brawn test driver (2008–2009) ===
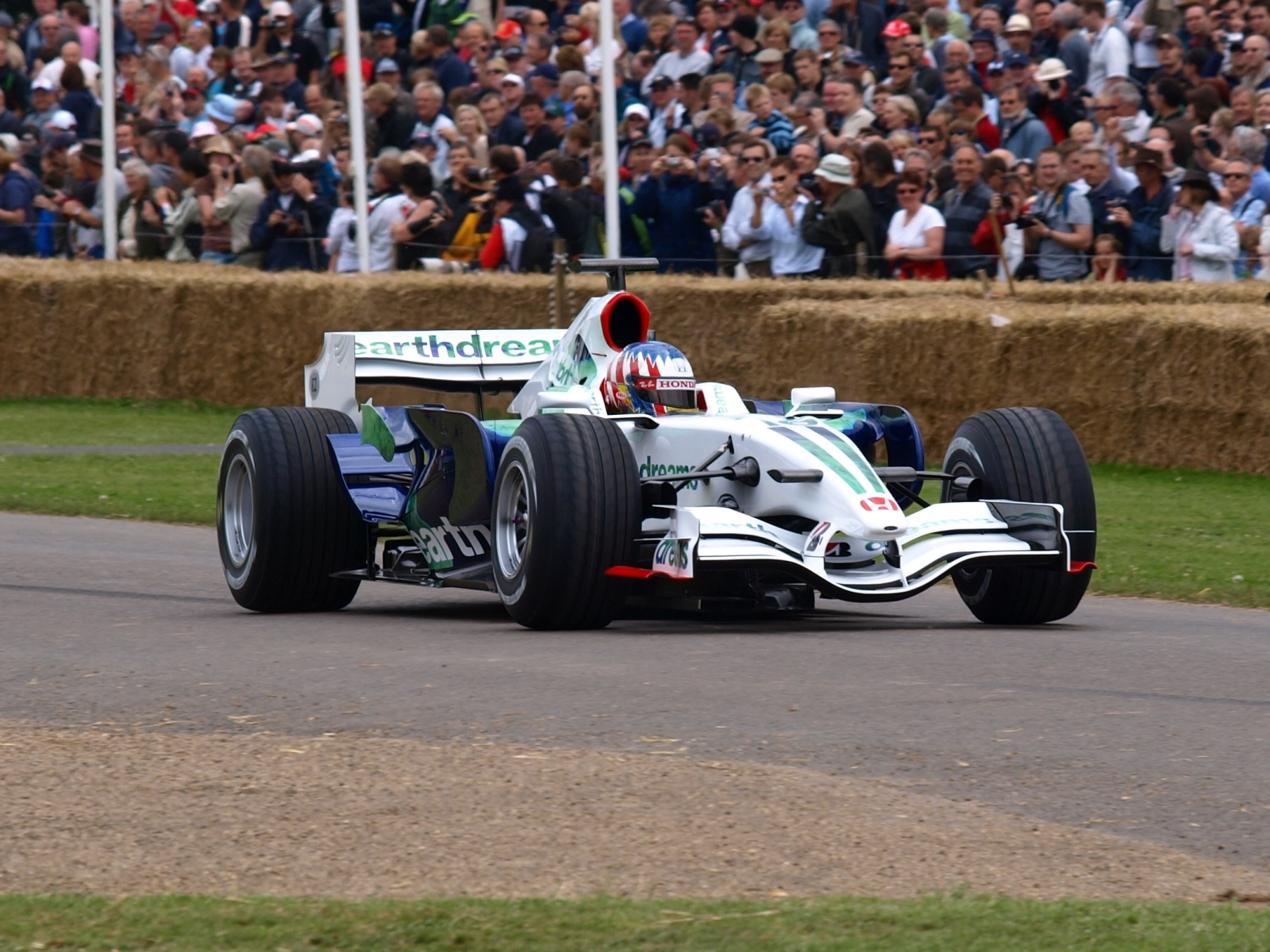
Wurz demonstrating a Honda RA108 at the 2008 Goodwood Festival of Speed.

Wurz was the Honda F1 test driver for the 2008 Formula One season, a role he kept when the team became Brawn GP in 2009. In the 2008 Singapore Grand Prix, Wurz drove the medical car after regular driver Jacques Tropenat fell ill.

Wurz did not return to Formula One after the 2009 season. He re-joined Williams in 2012 as a mentor for the team's inexperienced drivers: Bruno Senna and Pastor Maldonado.

== Other racing ==
=== Sportscar racing ===
Wurz signed with Peugeot to be part of their driving squad for the 2008 24 Hours of Le Mans and he also participated 1000km of Spa in the Le Mans Series.

In 2009, together with Marc Gené and David Brabham, Wurz took outright victory in the Le Mans 24 Hours, driving a works Peugeot. The 13-year gap between Wurz's victories is the largest in the event's history. Together with his victory in 2010 of the 12hrs race of Sebring with Gené and Anthony Davidson and his victory of the 1000 miles race of Road Atlanta with Stéphane Sarrazin and Franck Montagny,it made him win the three big Sportscar Classic Races in a Peugeot 908. Wurz continued to race for Peugeot Sport Total through 2010 and 2011, though no further Le Mans wins were forthcoming. In November 2011, Toyota Motorsports confirmed Wurz as one of their factory drivers for the companies planned return to the 24 Heures du Mans in 2012. Wurz would drive their new LMP1 Hybrid Prototype alongside Nicolas Lapierre and Kazuki Nakajima.

=== Rallycross ===
In May 2018, Wurz announced that he would follow in the footsteps of his father by making his competitive rallycross debut at the FIA World Rallycross Championship's World RX of Norway at Lånkebanen the following month, driving a Ford Fiesta Supercar for MJP Racing Team Austria.

== Other ventures ==
Since 2008, Wurz had been working as an expert at Austria's state broadcaster ORF alongside Ernst Hausleitner commenting F1 sessions.

=== Grand Prix Drivers' Association ===
Wurz has been the Chairman of the Grand Prix Drivers' Association (GPDA) since October 2014, making him the longest serving head in the organization. He oversaw the GPDA's advocacy for the Halo cockpit protection, stating that its function "had to take precedence" despite aesthetic concerns.

=== FIA Safety Commission ===
In his capacity as GPDA chairman and FIA 'expert representative', Wurz is also an active member of FIA safety commissions. These roles involve shaping circuit homologation standards, refining runoff configurations, and contributing to initiatives like the FIA Safety Week seminars. He regularly communicates with FIA leadership, most recently urging President Mohammed Ben Sulayem to act after concerning roll‑hoop failures.

=== Rainer-Wurz.com ===
In 2000, Wurz started a mountain bike team with his countryman Markus Rainer. The team, Rainer-Wurz.com, is sponsored by sponsors McLaren, Siemens and Cannondale, and has won the World Cup several times. In the early 2000s, niche bicycle brand Katarga presented a limited edition high-end mountain bike called the Alexander Wurz EVO SL, whose frame prominently featured Wurz's autograph.

=== Road safety ===
In 2006, Wurz and his father founded the company Test and Training International, a leader in the field of road safety and driver training. He also works closely with the FIA (Fédération Internationale de l'Automobile), since 2011 as an operating partner of the FIA Institute Young Driver Excellence Academy.

In 2015, TTI received the Prince Michael International Road Safety Award for its evidence-based driver training programmes, praised globally as “best in the world”, and its influence on road safety within governments and schools. Operating from sites in Vienna, Teesdorf, and Monaco, TTI leverages relationships with the FIA, leading motorsport series (F1, WEC, MotoGP, Rally), OEMs, and public authorities. Its training standards helped shape road safety legislation in Luxembourg, Switzerland, Finland, Poland, and formed the basis for an Austrian road‑safety law in 2002.

=== Team Superfund ===
Wurz lodged an entry for his own team into Formula One (announced on 31 May 2009) but the application was unsuccessful. Team Superfund was one of several new applicants hoping to compete in the sport from the 2010 season onwards. It was believed that Wurz would prefer to align the team with an existing constructor based in the UK, perhaps renting space, facilities and staff from its factory, while Superfund takes time to build up its own headquarters, possibly based on existing resources in Austria. The team would have been funded by Christian Baha, the owner of the Superfund Group, and the cars would be powered by Cosworth engines.

== Personal life ==
Wurz resides in Monaco, is married to Julia Horden and has three sons: Charlie, Felix and Oscar. He used to race with different coloured boots on each foot, but after his return to racing in 2007, he wore matching pairs. His eldest son, Charlie, has competed in FIA Formula 3 for Jenzer and Trident, and his youngest son, Oscar, won the 2024 Formula 4 CEZ Championship.

== Racing record ==
=== Career summary ===
Season	Series	Team	Races	Wins	Poles	F/Laps	Podiums	Points	Position
1992	German Formula Ford 1600	Walter Lechner Racing School	9	5	5	3	9	170	**1st**
1993	Austria Formula 3 Cup	RSM Marko	?	?	?	?	?	?	**1st**
1993	German Formula 3 Championship	RSM Marko	16	0	0	0	0	27	13th
1993	Masters of Formula 3	RSM Marko	1	0	0	0	0	N/A	17th
1994	German Formula 3 Championship	G+M Escom Motorsport	19	3	1	3	12	219	**2nd**
1994	Macau Grand Prix	G+M Escom Motorsport	1	0	0	0	0	N/A	15th
1994	Grand Prix de Monaco F3	G+M Escom Motorsport	1	0	0	0	0	N/A	10th
1994	Masters of Formula 3	G+M Escom Motorsport	1	0	0	0	0	N/A	26th
1995	German Formula 3 Championship	G+M Escom Motorsport	15	0	0	0	3	74	6th
1995	British Formula 3 Championship	G+M Escom Motorsport	1	0	0	0	0	4	21st
1995	Macau Grand Prix	G+M Escom Motorsport	1	0	0	0	0	N/A	7th
1995	Grand Prix de Monaco F3	G+M Escom Motorsport	1	0	0	0	0	N/A	6th
1995	Masters of Formula 3	G+M Escom Motorsport	1	0	0	0	0	N/A	NC
1996	International Touring Car Championship	Opel Team Joest	20	0	0	1	0	43	16th
1996	24 Hours of Le Mans	Joest Racing	1	1	0	0	1	N/A	**1st**
1997	Formula One	Mild Seven Benetton Renault	3	0	0	0	1	4	14th
1997	FIA GT Championship	AMG Mercedes	10	1	5	4	3	25	10th
1998	Formula One	Mild Seven Benetton Playlife	16	0	0	1	0	17	8th
1999	Formula One	Mild Seven Benetton Playlife	16	0	0	0	0	3	13th
2000	Formula One	Mild Seven Benetton Playlife	17	0	0	0	0	2	15th
2001	Formula One	West McLaren Mercedes	Test driver						
2002	Formula One	West McLaren Mercedes	Test driver						
2003	Formula One	West McLaren Mercedes	Test driver						
2004	Formula One	West McLaren Mercedes	Test driver						
2005	Formula One	West McLaren Mercedes; Team McLaren Mercedes	1	0	0	0	1	6	17th
2006	Formula One	Williams F1 Team	Test driver						
2007	Formula One	AT&T Williams	16	0	0	0	1	13	11th
2008	Formula One	Honda Racing F1 Team	Test driver						
2008	24 Hours of Le Mans	Team Peugeot Total	1	0	0	0	0	N/A	5th
2009	Formula One	Brawn GP F1 Team	Test driver						
2009	24 Hours of Le Mans	Team Peugeot Total	1	1	0	0	1	N/A	**1st**
2010	Le Mans Series	Team Peugeot Total	1	0	0	0	0	11	31st
2010	24 Hours of Le Mans	Team Peugeot Total	1	0	0	0	0	N/A	DNF
2011	American Le Mans Series	Peugeot Sport Total	2	1	0	0	1	N/A	NC
2011	Le Mans Series	Peugeot Sport Total	1	1	0	0	1	N/A	NC
2011	Intercontinental Le Mans Cup	Peugeot Sport Total	4	2	0	0	2	N/A	N/A
2011	24 Hours of Le Mans	Peugeot Sport Total	1	0	0	0	0	N/A	4th
2012	FIA World Endurance Championship	Toyota Racing	6	3	3	0	4	96	**3rd**
2012	24 Hours of Le Mans	Toyota Racing	1	0	0	0	0	N/A	DNF
2013	FIA World Endurance Championship	Toyota Racing	6	1	3	0	2	69.5	4th
2013	24 Hours of Le Mans	Toyota Racing	1	0	0	0	0	N/A	4th
2014	FIA World Endurance Championship	Toyota Racing	8	1	2	0	5	116	5th
2014	24 Hours of Le Mans	Toyota Racing	1	0	0	0	0	N/A	DNF
2015	FIA World Endurance Championship	Toyota Racing	8	0	0	0	1	79	6th
2015	24 Hours of Le Mans	Toyota Racing	1	0	0	0	0	N/A	6th
2016	IMSA SportsCar Championship	Ford Chip Ganassi Racing	1	0	0	0	0	27	27th
2018	World Rallycross Championship	MJP Racing Team Austria	2	0	0	0	0	0	29th

=== Complete German Formula Three Championship results ===
(key) (Races in bold indicate pole position) (Races in italics indicate fastest lap)

Year	Team	Chassis	Engine	Class	1	2	3	4	5	6	7	8	9	10	11	12	13	14	15	16	17	18	19	20	Pos.	Pts
1993	Marko RSM	Dallara 393	Fiat	A	ZOL; 1 Ret	ZOL; 2; 7	HOC1; 1; 9	HOC1; 2; 6	NÜR1; 1; 20	NÜR1; 2; 12	WUN; 1 Ret	WUN; 2 DNS	NOR; 1; 10	NOR; 2; 11	DIE; 1; 9	DIE; 2; 4	NÜR2; 1 Ret	NÜR2; 2; 12	SIN; 1	SIN; 2	AVU; 1 DNS	AVU; 2; 11	HOC2; 1; 9	HOC2; 2; 19	13th	27
1994	G+M Escom Motorsport	Dallara 394	Opel	A	ZOL; 1 C	ZOL; 2; 4	HOC1; 1; 1	**HOC1**; **2**; 1	NÜR1; 1; 3	NÜR1; 2; 3	WUN; 1 Ret	WUN; 2; 6	NOR; 1; 4	NOR; 2; 3	DIE; 1; 3	DIE; 2; 3	NÜR2; 1; 3	NÜR2; 2; 2	AVU; 1; 4	AVU; 2; 3	SIN; 1; 5	SIN; 2; 3	HOC2; 1; 7	HOC2; 2; 1	2nd	219
1995	G+M Escom Motorsport	Dallara 395	Opel	A	HOC1; 1; 4	HOC1; 2; 3	AVU; 1 Ret	AVU; 2; 5	NOR; 1; 22	NOR; 2; 8	DIE; 1 Ret	DIE; 2 DNS	NÜR; 1; 7	NÜR; 2; 8	SIN; 1 Ret	SIN; 2; 7	MAG; 1; 2	MAG; 2; 2	HOC2; 1 Ret	HOC2; 2; 19					6th	74

=== Complete International Touring Car Championship results ===
(key) (Races in bold indicate pole position) (Races in italics indicate fastest lap)

Year	Team	Car	1	2	3	4	5	6	7	8	9	10	11	12	13	14	15	16	17	18	19	20	21	22	23	24	25	26	Pos.	Pts
1996	Opel Team Joest	Opel Calibra V6 4x4	HOC; 1 Ret	HOC; 2 Ret	NÜR; 1; 12	NÜR; 2 DSQ	EST; 1; 10	EST; 2; 8	HEL; 1 Ret	HEL; 2; 9	NOR; 1; 12	NOR; 2; 8	DIE; 1; 9	DIE; 2; 8	SIL; 1; 7	SIL; 2; 4	NÜR; 1 Ret	NÜR; 2 DNS	MAG; 1; 10	MAG; 2; 6	MUG; 1; 6	MUG; 2; 9	HOC; 1 Ret	HOC; 2 DNS	INT; 1	INT; 2	SUZ; 1	SUZ; 2	16th	43

=== Complete Formula One results ===
(key) (Races in italics indicate fastest lap)

Year	Entrant	Chassis	Engine	1	2	3	4	5	6	7	8	9	10	11	12	13	14	15	16	17	18	19	WDC	Points
1997	Mild Seven Benetton Renault	Benetton B197	Renault RS9 3.0 V10	AUS	BRA	ARG	SMR	MON	ESP	CAN; Ret	FRA; Ret	GBR; 3	GER	HUN	BEL	ITA	AUT	LUX	JPN	EUR			14th	4
1998	Mild Seven Benetton Playlife	Benetton B198	Playlife GC37-01 3.0 V10	AUS; 7	BRA; 4	ARG; 4	SMR; Ret	ESP; 4	MON; Ret	CAN; 4	FRA; 5	GBR; 4	AUT; 9	GER; 11	HUN; 16^{†}	BEL; Ret	ITA; Ret	LUX; 7	JPN; 9				8th	17
1999	Mild Seven Benetton Playlife	Benetton B199	Playlife FB01 3.0 V10	AUS; Ret	BRA; 7	SMR; Ret	MON; 6	ESP; 10	CAN; Ret	FRA; Ret	GBR; 10	AUT; 5	GER; 7	HUN; 7	BEL; 14	ITA; Ret	EUR; Ret	MAL; 8	JPN; 10				13th	3
2000	Mild Seven Benetton Playlife	Benetton B200	Playlife FB02 3.0 V10	AUS; 7	BRA; Ret	SMR; 9	GBR; 9	ESP; 10	EUR; 12^{†}	MON; Ret	CAN; 9	FRA; Ret	AUT; 10	GER; Ret	HUN; 11	BEL; 13	ITA; 5	USA; 10	JPN; Ret	MAL; 7			15th	2
2005	West McLaren Mercedes	McLaren MP4-20	Mercedes FO 110R 3.0 V10	AUS	MAL	BHR; TD	SMR; 3	ESP	MON; TD	EUR; TD	CAN	USA	FRA	GBR	GER; TD								17th	6
2005	Team McLaren Mercedes	McLaren MP4-20	Mercedes FO 110R 3.0 V10													HUN; TD	TUR	ITA	BEL; TD	BRA; TD	JPN	CHN	17th	6
2006	Williams F1 Team	Williams FW28	Cosworth CA2006 2.4 V8	BHR; TD	MAL; TD	AUS; TD	SMR; TD	EUR; TD	ESP; TD	MON; TD	GBR; TD	CAN; TD	USA; TD	FRA; TD	GER; TD	HUN; TD	TUR; TD	ITA; TD	CHN; TD	JPN; TD	BRA; TD		–	–
2007	AT&T Williams	Williams FW29	Toyota RVX-07 2.4 V8	AUS; Ret	MAL; 9	BHR; 11	ESP; Ret	MON; 7	CAN; 3	USA; 10	FRA; 14	GBR; 13	EUR; 4	HUN; 14	TUR; 11	ITA; 13	BEL; Ret	JPN; Ret	CHN; 12	BRA			11th	13

^{†} Driver did not finish the Grand Prix, but was classified as he completed over 90% of the race distance.

=== Sports car racing ===
==== Le Mans 24 Hours results ====
Year	Team	Co-Drivers	Car	Class	Laps	Pos.	Class Pos.
1996	(Germany) Joest Racing	(United States) Davy Jones (Germany) Manuel Reuter	TWR Porsche WSC-95	LMP1	354	**1st**	**1st**
2008	(France) Team Peugeot Total	(France) Stéphane Sarrazin (Portugal) Pedro Lamy	Peugeot 908 HDi FAP	LMP1	368	5th	5th
2009	(France) Team Peugeot Total	(Australia) David Brabham (Spain) Marc Gené	Peugeot 908 HDi FAP	LMP1	382	**1st**	**1st**
2010	(France) Team Peugeot Total	(Spain) Marc Gené (United Kingdom) Anthony Davidson	Peugeot 908 HDi FAP	LMP1	360	DNF	DNF
2011	(France) Peugeot Sport Total	(United Kingdom) Anthony Davidson (Spain) Marc Gené	Peugeot 908	LMP1	351	4th	4th
2012	(Japan) Toyota Racing	(France) Nicolas Lapierre (Japan) Kazuki Nakajima	Toyota TS030 Hybrid	LMP1	134	DNF	DNF
2013	(Japan) Toyota Racing	(France) Nicolas Lapierre (Japan) Kazuki Nakajima	Toyota TS030 Hybrid	LMP1	341	4th	4th
2014	(Japan) Toyota Racing	(France) Stéphane Sarrazin (Japan) Kazuki Nakajima	Toyota TS040 Hybrid	LMP1-H	219	DNF	DNF
2015	(Japan) Toyota Racing	(France) Stéphane Sarrazin (United Kingdom) Mike Conway	Toyota TS040 Hybrid	LMP1	387	6th	6th

==== Le Mans Series results ====
Year	Entrant	Class	Chassis	Engine	1	2	3	4	5	Rank	Points
2010	Team Peugeot Total	LMP1	Peugeot 908 HDi FAP	Peugeot HDI 5.5 L Turbo V12 (Diesel)	LEC	SPA; 4	ALG	HUN	SIL	31st	11
2011	Peugeot Sport Total	LMP1	Peugeot 908	Peugeot HDI 3.7 L Turbo V8 (Diesel)	LEC	SPA^{1} 1	IMO	SIL	EST	NC	N/A

^{1} Driver run for the Intercontinental Le Mans Cup, no points awarded for the Le Mans Series.

==== American Le Mans Series results ====
Year	Entrant	Class	Chassis	Engine	1	2	3	4	5	6	7	8	9	Rank	Points	Ref
2010	Team Peugeot Total	LMP1	Peugeot 908 HDi FAP	Peugeot HDi 5.5 L Turbo V12 (Diesel)	SEB; 1	LNB	MON	UTA	LIM	MID	AME	MOS	PET; 2	NC	–	
2011	Peugeot Sport Total	LMP1	Peugeot 908	Peugeot HDI 3.7 L Turbo V8 (Diesel)	SEB^{1} 8	LBH	LIM	MOS	MDO	RDA	BAL	MON	PET^{1} 1	NC	N/A	

^{1} Driver run for the Intercontinental Le Mans Cup, no points awarded for the American Le Mans Series.

==== Intercontinental Le Mans Cup results ====
Year	Entrant	Class	Chassis	Engine	1	2	3	4	5	6	7	Ref
2011	Peugeot Sport Total	LMP1	Peugeot 908	Peugeot HDI 3.7 L Turbo V8 (Diesel)	SEB; 8	SPA; 1	LMS; 4	IMO	SIL	PET; 1	ZHU	

=== Complete FIA World Endurance Championship results ===
Year	Entrant	Class	Chassis	Engine	1	2	3	4	5	6	7	8	Rank	Points
2012	Toyota Racing	LMP1	Toyota TS030 Hybrid	Toyota 3.4 L V8 (Hybrid)	SEB	SPA	LMS; Ret	SIL; 2	**SÃO**; 1	BHR; Ret	**FUJ**; 1	**SHA**; 1	3rd	96
2013	Toyota Racing	LMP1	Toyota TS030 Hybrid	Toyota 3.4 L V8 (Hybrid)	**SIL**; 4	SPA; Ret	LMS; 4	SÃO	COA	FUJ; 1	**SHA**; 2	**BHR**; Ret	4th	69.5
2014	Toyota Racing	LMP1	Toyota TS040 Hybrid	Toyota 3.7 L V8 (Hybrid)	**SIL**; 2	SPA; 3	**LMS**; Ret	COA; 6	FUJ; 2	SHA; 2	BHR; 1	SÃO; 4	5th	116
2015	Toyota Racing	LMP1	Toyota TS040 Hybrid	Toyota 3.7 L V8 (Hybrid)	SIL; 4	SPA; 5	LMS; 6	NÜR; 6	COA; Ret	FUJ; 6	SHA; 5	BHR; 3	6th	79

=== Complete IMSA SportsCar Championship results ===
(key) (Races in bold indicate pole position) (Races in italics indicate fastest lap)

Year	Entrant	Class	Chassis	Engine	1	2	3	4	5	6	7	8	9	10	Rank	Points
2016	Ford Chip Ganassi Racing	P	Ford EcoBoost Riley DP	Ford EcoBoost 3.5 L V6 Turbo	DAY; 5	SEB	LBH	LGA	DET	WGL	MOS	ELK	COA	PET	27th	27

=== Complete FIA World Rallycross Championship results ===
(key)

==== Supercar ====
Year	Entrant	Car	1	2	3	4	5	6	7	8	9	10	11	12	WRX	Points
2018	MJP Racing Team Austria	Ford Fiesta	BAR	POR	BEL	GBR	NOR; 18	SWE	CAN	FRA	LAT; 18	USA	GER	RSA	29th	0

== Notes ==
Sporting positions
Preceded by Peter Wieser	Austria Formula 3 Cup champion 1993	Succeeded by Josef Neuhauser
Preceded by Yannick Dalmas; JJ Lehto; Masanori Sekiya	Winner of the 24 Hours of Le Mans; 1996; With: Manuel Reuter & Davy Jones	Succeeded by Michele Alboreto; Stefan Johansson; Tom Kristensen
Preceded by Allan McNish; Rinaldo Capello; Tom Kristensen	Winner of the 24 Hours of Le Mans; 2009; With: Marc Gené & David Brabham	Succeeded by Timo Bernhard; Romain Dumas; Mike Rockenfeller
Awards
Preceded by Giancarlo Fisichella	Lorenzo Bandini Trophy; 1999	Succeeded by Jarno Trulli
Trade union offices
Preceded by Pedro de la Rosa	GPDA Chairman; 2014–	Succeeded by Incumbent
