= Williams FW28 =

Formula One racing car

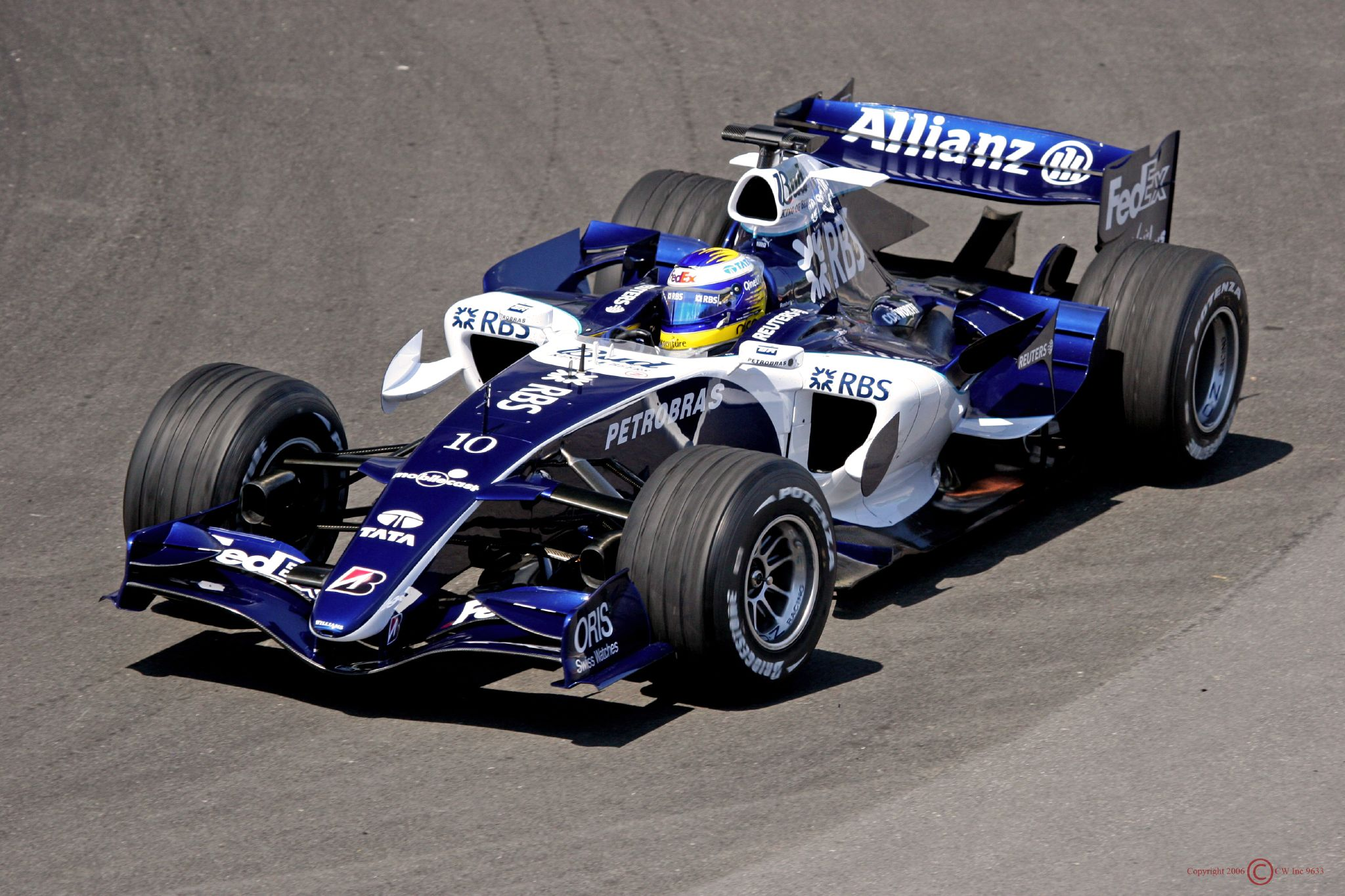
- Nico Rosberg driving the FW28 at the 2006 Canadian Grand Prix
- Category: Formula One
- Constructor: Williams
- Designers: Sam Michael (Technical Director); Jörg Zander (Chief Designer); Clive Cooper (Head of Design - Composites and Structures); Christopher Brawn (Head of Design - Suspension, Steering, Breaks); Mark Loasby (Head of Design - Systems); Steve Wise (Head of Electronics); Loïc Bigois (Chief Aerodynamicist); Alex Hitzinger (Engine Chief Designer - Cosworth)
- Predecessor: Williams FW27
- Successor: Williams FW29

Technical specifications
- Chassis: Carbon-fibre and honeycomb composite structure
- Suspension (front): Williams carbon-fibre double wishbone arrangement, with composite toe-link and pushrod-activated torsion springs
- Suspension (rear): Williams carbon-fibre double wishbone arrangement, with composite toe-link and pushrod-activated torsion springs
- Engine: Cosworth CA2006 and Toyota RVX-06 (post-season testing only) 2.4-litre V8 (90°) naturally aspirated
- Transmission: Williams 7-speed seamless-shift sequential semi-automatic
- Power: 755 hp @ 19,250 rpm (314.7 hp/L)
- Fuel: Petrobras
- Lubricants: Castrol
- Tyres: Bridgestone

Competition history
- Notable entrants: Williams F1 Team
- Notable drivers: 9. (Australia) Mark Webber; 10. (Germany) Nico Rosberg
- Debut: 2006 Bahrain Grand Prix
- Last event: 2006 Brazilian Grand Prix
| Races | Wins | Poles | F/Laps |
|---|---|---|---|
| 18 | 0 | 0 | 1 |
- Constructors' Championships: 0
- Drivers' Championships: 0

The Williams FW28 was the car with which the Williams team competed in the 2006 Formula One season. The drivers were Mark Webber and rookie Nico Rosberg, the reigning GP2 Series champion. Webber was in his second year with the team, and teammate Nico Rosberg carried a hint of nostalgia, as Nico's father Keke had won the 1982 F1 championship in a Cosworth-engined Williams.

This was the first V8-powered Williams car since the FW12 in 1988 and also the first Williams car ran on Bridgestone tyres since the FW22 in 2000.

== Season overview ==
2006 was very disappointing for the team. The car was dogged by a handling problem which affected the cars on the entry to corners. Despite the effectiveness of the Cosworth engine, the Bridgestone tyres and the two drivers, the FW28 could only display brief flashes of promise. Too often this promise was compromised by poor reliability - an embarrassment for a team that prided itself on engineering excellence.

The car seemed competitive at the beginning of the year when the cars scored a double points finish with Rosberg setting the fastest lap of the race on his F1 début at the Bahrain Grand Prix. An excellent second-row qualifying performance at Sepang was wasted when both cars suffered engine failures, and the season went downhill from there. Exceptions were Australia and Monaco, both races where Webber looked a contender for at least a podium finish until retiring on both occasions with hydraulics failure and an exhaust fire respectively.

A note of significance for Webber and Williams came on lap 21 of the 2006 Australian Grand Prix. By leading the lap Webber became the first Australian to have led his home grand prix since the last non-championship AGP was held in 1984.

Williams finished eighth in the Constructors' Championship - the team's lowest finish since its inaugural season in 1978. Unhappy by the team's reliability problems, Webber departed the team at the end of the season to join Red Bull Racing.

== Sponsorship and livery ==
Williams went into the 2006 season with renewed major sponsorships such as Allianz, RBS, FedEx, Reuters, Oris, Hamleys, Budweiser, Petrobras and Castrol. The team received new sponsorships such as Mobilecast and Tata Group while Hewlett-Packard was discontinued. While it retained the dark blue on white scheme, the stylized "kidney grille" was gone from the nose with the loss of BMW as engine supplier.

At the European and German Grands Prix, the "Budweiser" logo was simplified as "Bud" due to the licensing issues from its parent company, Anheuser-Busch. At the French and Turkish Grands Prix, the Budweiser logo was completely removed. In these competitions, Budweiser was replaced by SeaWorld.

== FW28B ==
The Williams FW28B is an interim version of the FW28 the team used to prepare for the 2007 season. After an obviously disappointing 2006, Williams decided to opt for Toyota engines for 2007 and therefore built the FW28B. The car is similar to the FW28 in all aspects except for being powered by Toyota's 2006 engine, the RVX-06.

During winter practice, the team also experimented with new front wings and other aerodynamic parts which helped the development of their new car FW29 car.

== Gallery ==
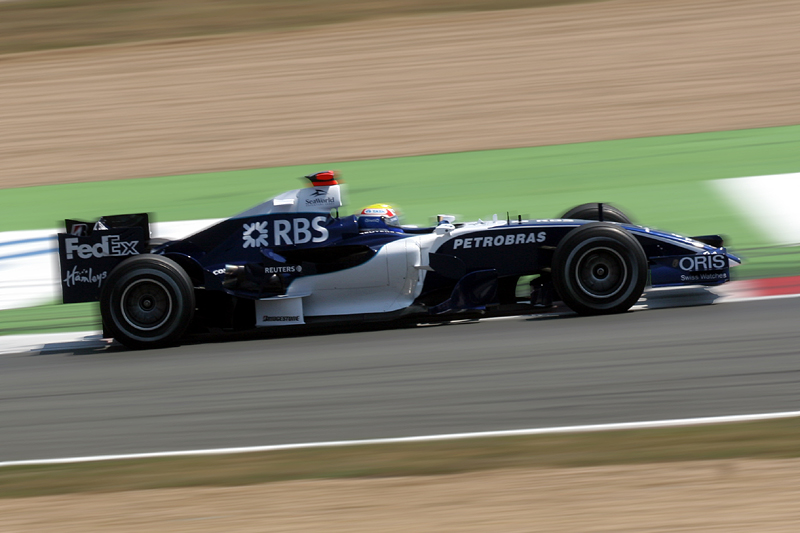
Mark Webber at the 2006 French Grand Prix.

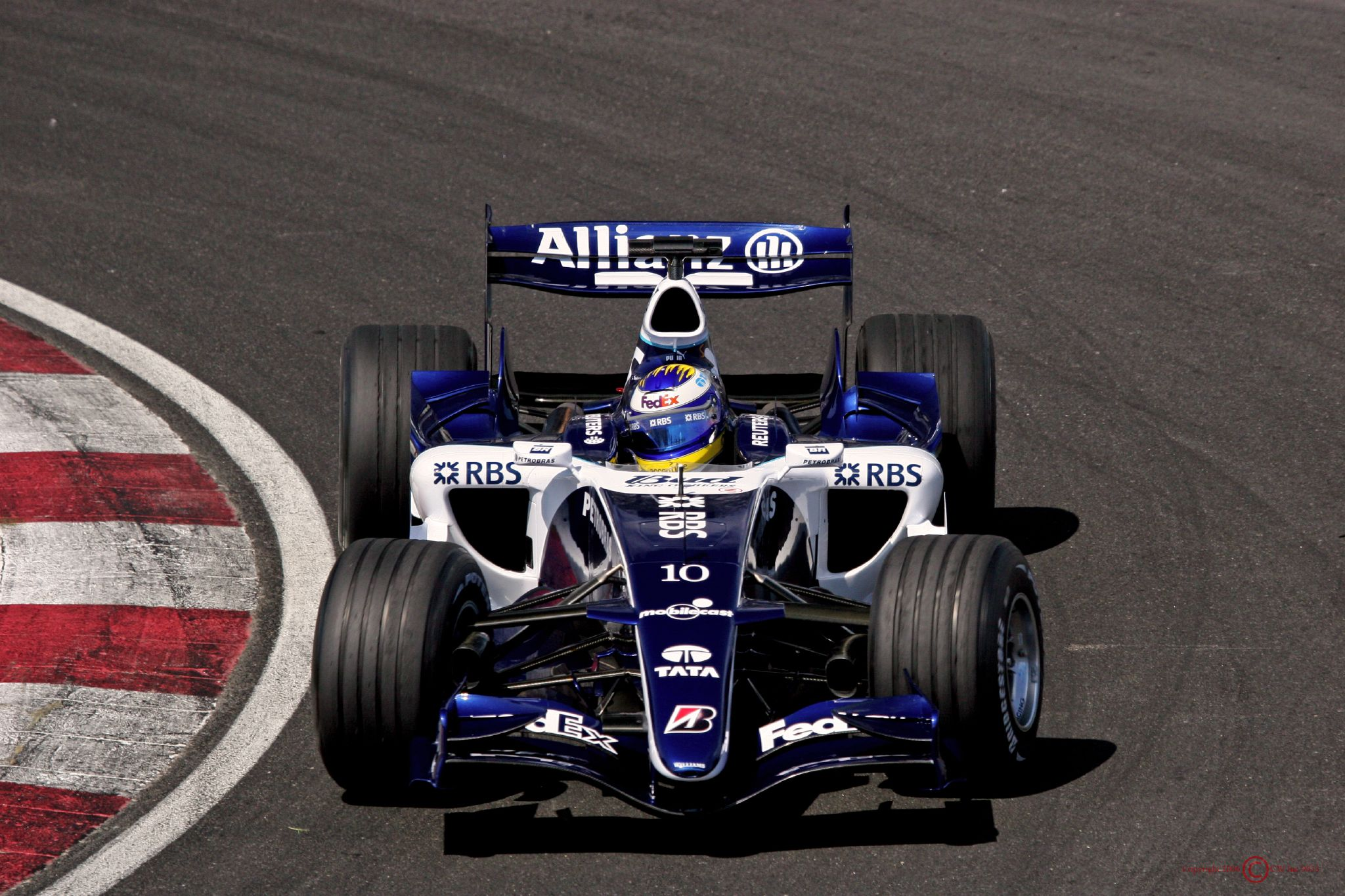
Nico Rosberg at the 2006 Canadian Grand Prix.

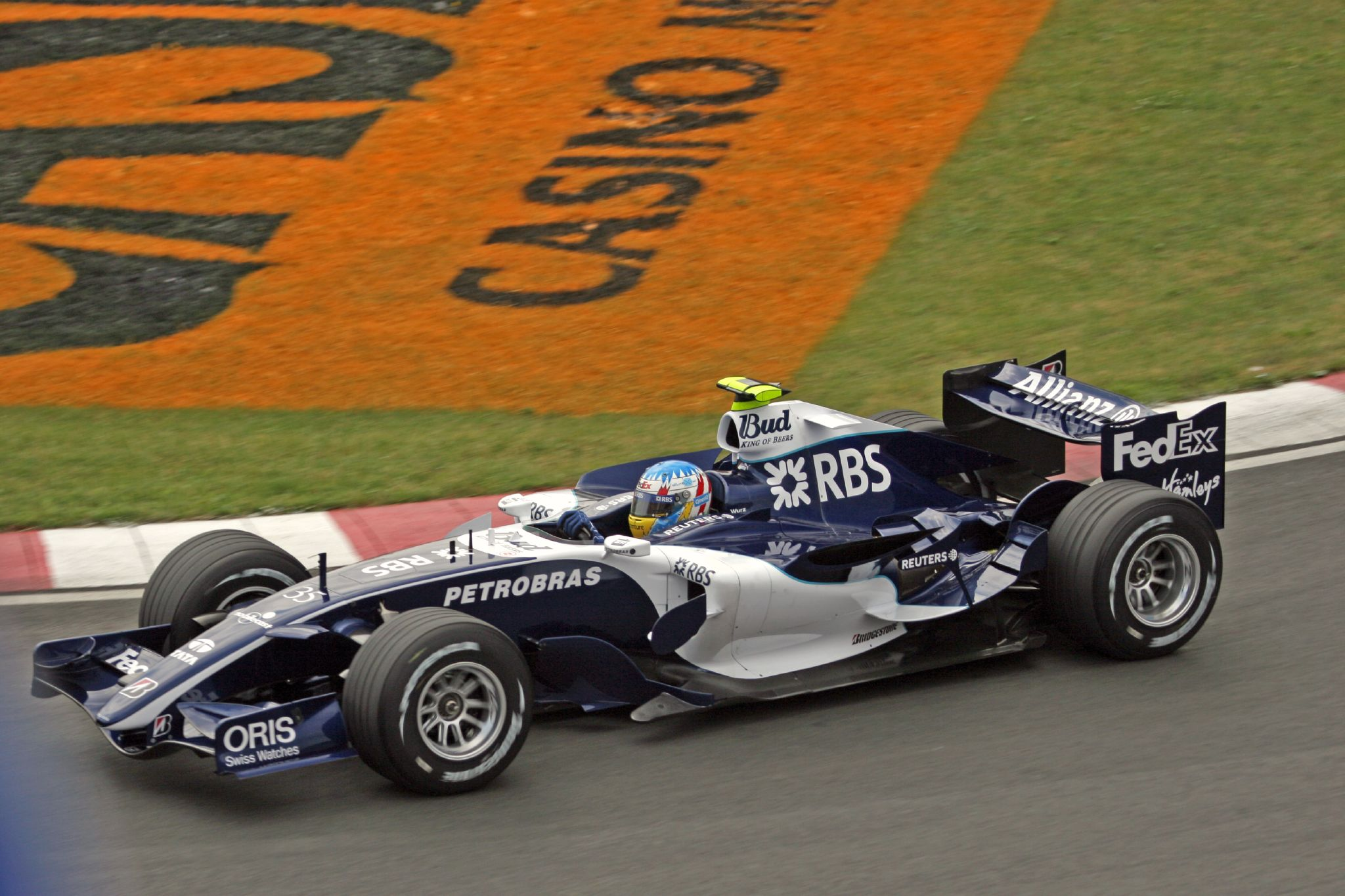
Test driver Alexander Wurz at the 2006 Canadian Grand Prix.

== Complete Formula One results ==
(key) (results in italics indicate fastest lap)

| Year | Team | Engine | Tyres | Drivers | 1 | 2 | 3 | 4 | 5 | 6 | 7 | 8 | 9 | 10 | 11 | 12 | 13 | 14 | 15 | 16 | 17 | 18 | Points | WCC |
|---|---|---|---|---|---|---|---|---|---|---|---|---|---|---|---|---|---|---|---|---|---|---|---|---|
| 2006 | Williams | Cosworth V8 | B | | BHR | MAL | AUS | SMR | EUR | ESP | MON | GBR | CAN | USA | FRA | GER | HUN | TUR | ITA | CHN | JPN | BRA | 11 | 8th |
| 2006 | Williams | Cosworth V8 | B | (Australia) Mark Webber | 6 | Ret | Ret | 6 | Ret | 9 | Ret | Ret | 12 | Ret | Ret | Ret | Ret | 10 | 10 | 8 | Ret | Ret | 11 | 8th |
| 2006 | Williams | Cosworth V8 | B | (Germany) Nico Rosberg | 7 | Ret | Ret | 11 | 7 | 11 | Ret | 9 | Ret | 9 | 14 | Ret | Ret | Ret | Ret | 11 | 10 | Ret | 11 | 8th |

== Sponsors ==
| Brand | Country | Placed on |
|---|---|---|
| RBS | United Kingdom | Front wing, nose, fin |
| Petrobras | Brazil | Mirrors, nosecone |
| Reuters | United Kingdom | Sidepods, cockpit side |
| Allianz | Germany | Rear wing |
| FedEx | United States | Front wing, rear wing end plate |
| Budweiser | United States | Fin, nose |
| Hamleys | United Kingdom | Nose, rear wing end plate |
| Oris | Switzerland | Front wing end plate |
| MobileCast | United States | Fin |
| Tata | India | Nosecone |
| Cosworth | United Kingdom | Side |
