= 2007 Malaysian Grand Prix =

Coordinates: 2°45′39″N 101°44′18″E

Race 2 of 17 in the 2007 Formula One World Championship
← Previous race	Next race →

Race details
- Date: 8 April 2007
- Official name: 2007 Formula 1 Petronas Malaysian Grand Prix
- Location: Sepang International Circuit; Sepang, Selangor, Malaysia
- Course: Permanent racing facility
- Course length: 5.543 km (3.444 miles)
- Distance: 56 laps, 310.408 km (192.879 miles)
- Weather: Sunny
- Attendance: 115,794 (Weekend)

Pole position
Driver	(Brazil) Felipe Massa	Ferrari
- Time: 1:35.043

Fastest lap
Driver	(United Kingdom) Lewis Hamilton	McLaren-Mercedes
- Time: 1:36.701 on lap 22

Podium
First	(Spain) Fernando Alonso	McLaren-Mercedes
Second	(United Kingdom) Lewis Hamilton	McLaren-Mercedes
Third	(Finland) Kimi Räikkönen	Ferrari

The 2007 Malaysian Grand Prix (formally the 2007 Formula 1 Petronas Malaysian Grand Prix) was a Formula One motor race, held on 8 April 2007 at the Sepang International Circuit and the second race of the 2007 FIA Formula One World Championship. Reigning world champion Fernando Alonso won the race from second on the grid, with McLaren teammate Lewis Hamilton finishing second. This marked McLaren's first one-two finish since the 2005 Brazilian Grand Prix. Previous race winner Kimi Räikkönen finished third. Räikkönen's Ferrari teammate Felipe Massa started the race from pole position, but was passed by both McLarens in the first two corners of the first lap, eventually finishing in fifth place behind BMW's Nick Heidfeld.

The Malaysian race was the first at which the two different tyre types used during the race were differentiated by a white stripe painted into the tread of the softer type, helping spectators to understand the race strategy of each driver.

== Report ==
=== Background ===
Pre-race testing

The 2007 Malaysian Grand Prix was held at the Sepang International Circuit near Kuala Lumpur on 8 April, with practice and qualification for the race held on the two preceding days. It was preceded by a test session at the Sepang circuit attended by all the teams except the small Dutch team Spyker, who believed that it would not be possible to try upgrades on their car in time for the race. The test was scheduled to begin on 27 March 2007 and last for three days. The teams, which are all based in Europe, arrived at the test directly from the Australian Grand Prix, held nine days previously. Robert Kubica (BMW Sauber), Kimi Räikkönen (Scuderia Ferrari) and Lewis Hamilton (McLaren) set the fastest times on the first, second and third days of the test, respectively; the final day saw partly wet conditions. Due to the poor weather, the teams agreed to extend the testing by one day, with Heikki Kovalainen (Renault F1) fastest.

Dispute over customer cars

The issue of teams using 'customer cars', that is cars obtained from other teams, surfaced before the race when Spyker protested the Scuderia Toro Rosso (STR) team's use of cars they claimed had been designed by STR's sister team, Red Bull Racing. The Concorde Agreement, which dictates the terms by which the teams compete in the Formula One world championship, requires teams to design their own cars. The Malaysian stewards rejected the protest, with the Fédération Internationale de l'Automobile (FIA, the sport's governing body) stating that "it would be entirely inappropriate for the Stewards to involve themselves in a matter being dealt with at the instigation and election of the Protestor, Spyker". Red Bull threatened legal action over Spyker's possession of their car designs to use as evidence against STR, but nothing materialised. The FIA did not investigate how Spyker obtained Red Bull's car designs.

Flexible floors

The FIA introduced more stringent tests on the cars at the Malaysian race to ensure floor mounting systems used by Ferrari and BMW Sauber were not in breach of the regulations. After the first race of the season in Australia, the McLaren team had requested clarification of the rules regarding systems that allowed the front of the car's undertray to move upwards under aerodynamic loading at high speed. Autosport magazine reported that this movement would potentially increase straight line speed. Massa and Räikkönen said the performance of the Ferrari F2007 car would not be compromised in any way by the required modifications.

Tyre markings

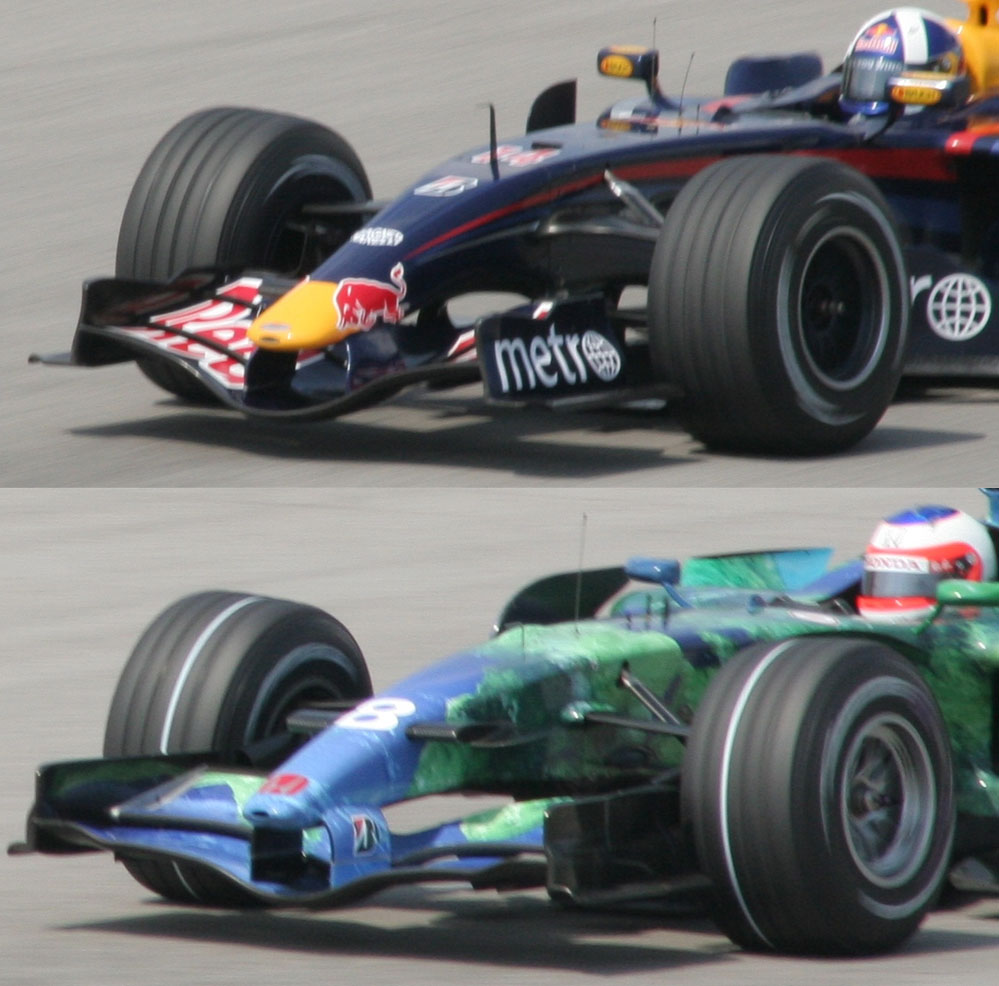
The tyres shown above do not have a stripe and therefore are the harder compound (officially named the 'prime' tyre). The tyres shown below have the white stripe indicating they are using the softer compound (the 'option' tyre).

The Malaysian race was the first at which the tyre compounds used on the cars were differentiated by a white stripe painted in the tyre treads. Since the beginning of the 2007 Formula One season, teams had been obliged to use two different kinds of tyre on each car during the race: a 'prime' tyre and an 'option' tyre. The prime tyre has a harder rubber compound and the option tyre a softer one. In general terms, a softer tyre is likely to grip better and provide a higher cornering speed. Conversely, a harder tyre will often be slower, but may last longer. Formula One cars typically use between two and four sets of tyres during a race and using harder tyres may allow fewer pit stops to change tyres. Track conditions, the car characteristics or driving style can reduce or even reverse these differences. In Australia two weeks earlier, the softer tyres were marked with a small white circle to facilitate understanding of each driver's tyre strategy, but commentators and spectators were unable to distinguish the two compounds even at slow speeds. The idea of the white stripe was tested during the test session a week before the Malaysian round of the season. The white stripe was applied with paint marker pens. Over the weekend 160 pens were used. Overall reaction to this system was positive, with the Williams team's technical director Sam Michael, who came up with the initial idea, calling it a "pretty good solution".

=== Friday drivers ===
For the first free practice session, Sebastian Vettel, BMW's test driver, and Williams's test driver Kazuki Nakajima participated.

=== Practice ===
The race was preceded by three practice sessions. Ferrari's Felipe Massa set the pace in the first of two 90-minute practice sessions on Friday, with a time of 1:34.972, edging out McLaren's Fernando Alonso by three-tenths of a second. Alonso's teammate Hamilton was third, with Ferrari's other driver, Räikkönen, just behind in fourth. Nico Rosberg, Mark Webber, Jarno Trulli, Kazuki Nakajima, Ralf Schumacher, and Robert Kubica rounded out the top ten.

Massa was comfortably fastest in Friday's second practice, setting a time of 1:35.780. The Renault team improved dramatically from first practice, with Giancarlo Fisichella second and Kovalainen third. Räikkönen was again fourth, followed by Rosberg, Alexander Wurz, Kubica and Schumacher. The McLarens of Hamilton and Alonso dropped to ninth and 12th respectively. McLaren boss Ron Dennis played down the times, saying the team was concentrating on tyre evaluation.

Dennis's lack of concern was vindicated on Saturday, with Hamilton setting the fastest time in practice with a lap of 1:34.811. Massa finished the session a tenth of a second behind, with third placed Alonso a further half second behind. Kubica, Räikkönen, Rosberg and Heidfeld followed, with Super Aguri driver Anthony Davidson eighth fastest. Super Aguri are regarded as a sister team to the Honda F1 works team, who set only the 17th and 19th fastest times. The 2007 Super Aguri is widely thought to be an updated version of Honda's 2006 car.

=== Qualifying ===
The qualifying session to determine the starting order for the race was held in three parts, six cars ware eliminated after each of the first two parts. In the first part, the Spykers of Christijan Albers and Adrian Sutil set the slowest times of all. Spyker technical director Mike Gascoyne admitted that the team had "made a mistake" in missing the test at Sepang a week earlier. Scott Speed (STR), Anthony Davidson (Super Aguri), Rubens Barrichello (Honda) and Alex Wurz (Williams) were also eliminated. Davidson blamed STR driver Vitantonio Liuzzi for obstructing his qualifying lap, stating "he was pretty aware I was behind him". Wurz was slowed by gear-selection problems in his Williams. At the front, McLaren driver Alonso set the fastest time with a 1:34.942. His teammate Hamilton was second fastest, with the Ferraris third and fifth, split by Kubica's BMW.

Rain threatened during the second part. Although it did not materialise, all the drivers posted quick laps early on to avoid having to set a time on a wet track. Alonso was again fastest with a 1:34.057. Hamilton, both Ferraris, BMW Saubers, and Toyotas, as well as Rosberg (Williams) and Webber (Red Bull) also passed through to the final part. Kovalainen (Renault), Fisichella (Renault), Coulthard (Red Bull), Sato (Super Aguri), Button (Honda) and Liuzzi (STR) were eliminated. 2006 champions Renault failed to get either car into the final part. Team engineering director Pat Symonds noted that "...the overall level of performance is disappointing, but we now have to knuckle down and make the most of the situation we find ourselves in." Button claimed Honda's grid position of 15th was the "maximum we could possibly get".

In the final part of qualifying, Massa set the fastest time, taking pole position from second placed Alonso in the last few seconds as rain began to fall, with Räikkönen completing the top three. Massa's lap of 1:35.043 marked tyre company Bridgestone's 100th pole position in Formula One. Hamilton came fourth, over half a second behind the leading three. He conceded inexperience was to blame, saying that there were "some spots of rain on my visor, so I had to sort of let off". Heidfeld qualified fifth, ahead of Nico Rosberg in sixth and teammate Kubica in seventh. The Toyotas of Trulli and Schumacher were eighth and ninth, with Webber completing the top ten.

Race stewards initially imposed a 10-place penalty on Coulthard and Barrichello, for changing their engines prior to qualification. Since 2006, the engines of Formula One cars are required to last for two races. However, after further investigation they rescinded Coulthard's penalty, as he had retired from the previous race and his change had been made before the start of the race weekend. Barrichello's penalty stood.

=== Race ===
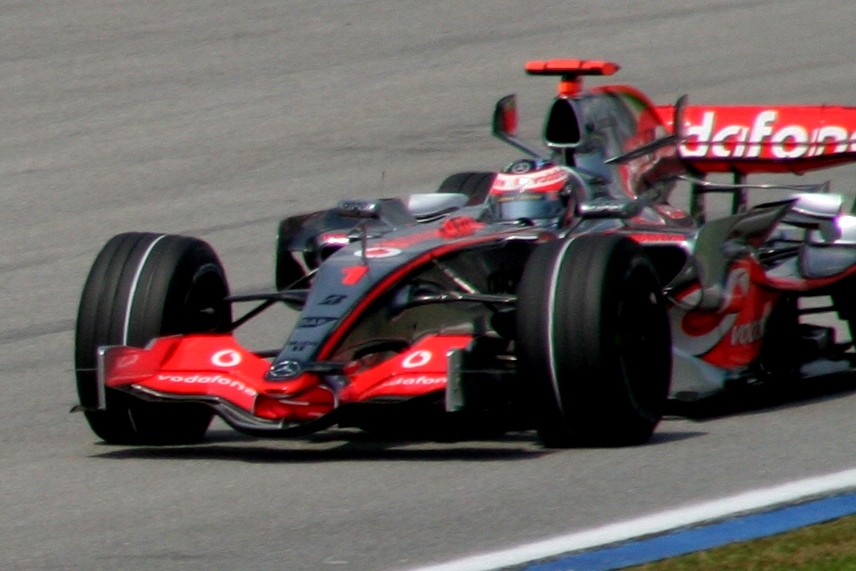
Fernando Alonso won the race; his first victory for McLaren.

In contrast to the rain-affected practice and qualifying sessions, the track was dry for the duration of the race. All of the drivers except Jenson Button, Jarno Trulli and the two Red Bull drivers started on the softer option tyre. The first lap was eventful: Alonso started better than polesitter Massa and was able to take the inside line into turn one and gain the lead. Hamilton passed Räikkönen for third into the first corner, then drove round the outside of Massa into turn two to take second place. Meanwhile, the suspension on Adrian Sutil's Spyker failed at turn four, causing it to collide with Button's Honda and retire from the race. Button continued after making an early pitstop to repair the damage. Liuzzi and Sato also collided at turn four, causing Liuzzi to pit for a new front wing. After the race the drivers blamed each other for the incident.

During the early laps, Massa appeared to have a faster car than Hamilton, and repeatedly tried to pass the McLaren on the inside of turn four. His first attempt was on lap three, but Hamilton braked late and kept ahead of Massa into the following corner. Massa tried again at the same place on the next two laps. He passed Hamilton briefly into the turn on lap five, but overshot the corner and ran wide onto the grass. He dropped to fifth, behind teammate Räikkönen and BMW's Nick Heidfeld. Hamilton apologised after the race for 'tricking' Massa into the move. Albers, in the sole remaining Spyker, retired on lap nine with a gearbox fire.

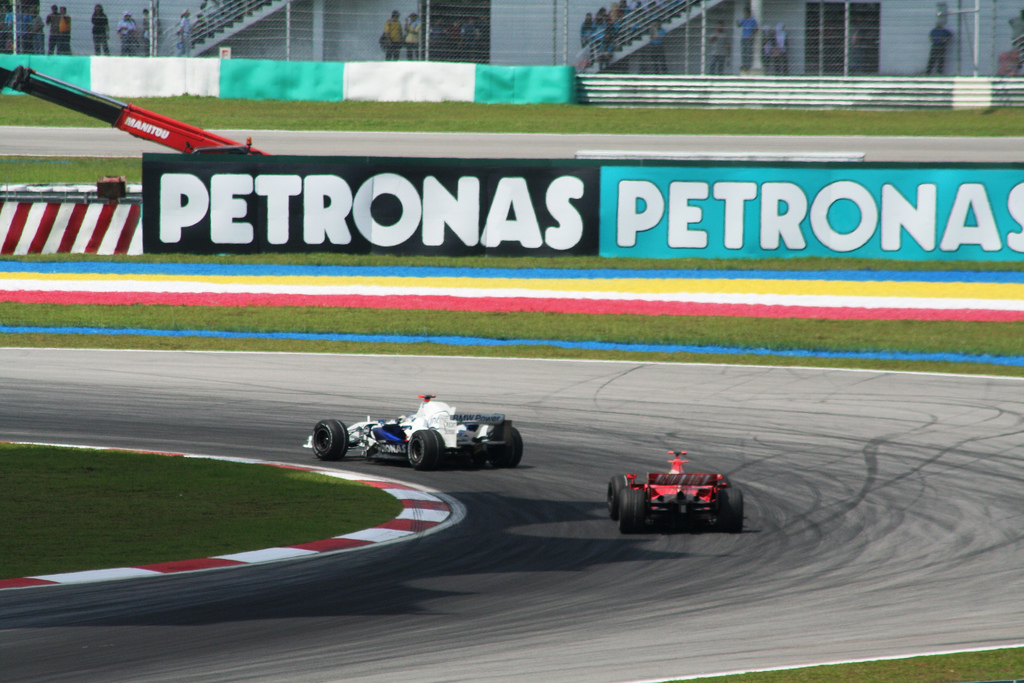
Felipe Massa was unable to get past Nick Heidfeld after losing time due to a mistake while attempting to pass Lewis Hamilton earlier in the race.

While the two Ferraris were delayed behind Hamilton, Alonso was pulling away at the front, setting fastest laps on laps seven and fifteen. On lap 12, Robert Kubica was the first man to pit for fuel and fresh tyres, however he reported traction control problems four laps later and lost places. Alonso had extended his lead over Hamilton to 15 seconds by the first round of pitstops. He had experienced radio problems before refuelling, but these were fixed during the stop. The Renaults were circulating in eighth and tenth by the pit stops, with Fisichella ahead of Kovalainen. Button was one of the few drivers who started on the slower harder tyre and was dropping down the field, as Takuma Sato passed the Briton. All of the front runners were on the same tyre strategy, with Räikkönen being the first front runner to pit. He found himself behind Fisichella as he exited. A short pit stop by Hamilton enabled him to come out of the pits ahead of the Renault, leaving a car between himself and Räikkönen during the pit window. Heidfeld's late stop on lap 22 helped him stay ahead of Massa. The top five positions remained unchanged, however Hamilton's different strategy enabled him to escape Räikkönen and close in on leader Alonso at a second per lap. Despite pitting on lap 20, he set the fastest lap of the race on lap 22 in 1:36.701.

Kubica dropped to 13th as his traction control fault worsened, and a train of cars that wanted to pass developed behind him. Kovalainen's performance was much better than at the previous round in Melbourne, and he attempted to pass Jarno Trulli for eighth. The top five again remained the same after the second round of stops. However, Hamilton's short first stop necessitated a relatively early second stop, allowing Räikkönen to reduce the gap and Alonso to extend his lead to 18 seconds. Nico Rosberg, running in sixth place after the stops, was forced to retire with hydraulic problems on lap 43. David Coulthard also retired after problems with his brake pedal, the same problem that he experienced in the Friday practice session.

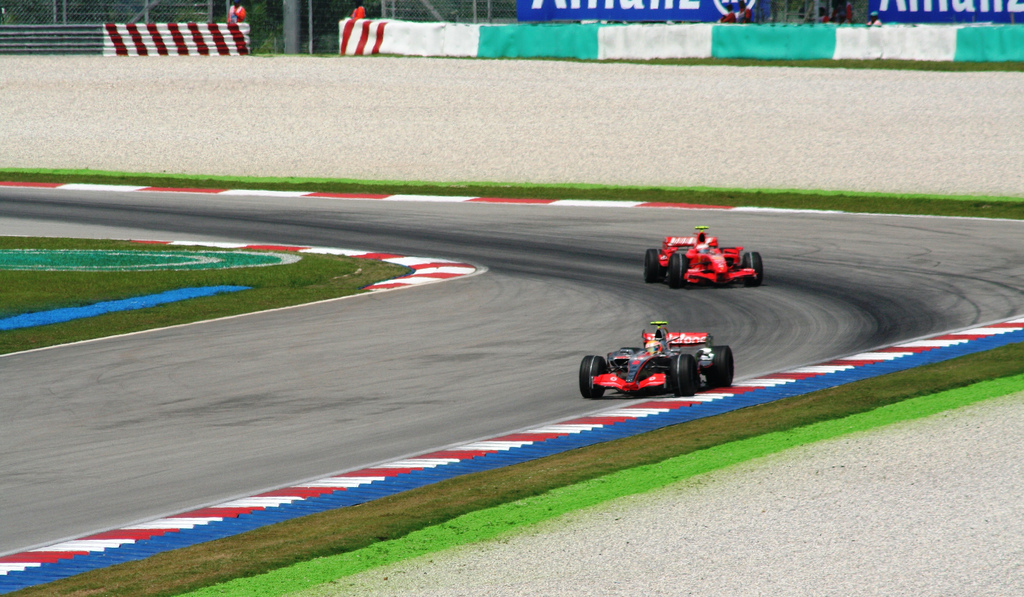
Lewis Hamilton kept Kimi Räikkönen's Ferrari at bay to score McLaren's first one-two since the 2005 Brazilian Grand Prix.

Alonso was able to extend his advantage in the closing stages, winning the race by 17 seconds. Although experiencing pressure from Räikkönen who was faster on the harder tyres, Hamilton was able to maintain second place behind Alonso, with Räikkönen claiming the final podium position. This was McLaren's first victory since the 2005 Japanese Grand Prix, and the team's first one-two since the 2005 Brazilian Grand Prix. Heidfeld and Massa secured fourth and fifth places respectively, 15 seconds behind Räikkönen. Heidfeld said later that beating Massa was "a fantastic experience". Fisichella finished sixth, and claimed it felt like a podium given the performance of the car. Trulli was seventh, and rookie Kovalainen scored his first F1 point in eighth. Wurz managed to come through from 19th to ninth, with his opening stint elevating him to 11th place by his first pit stop. Although he claimed no points, he said later "it bodes well for Williams's chances in the rest of the season". tenth placed Mark Webber was the final driver to finish on the same lap as the leaders. Honda finished outside the points in 11th and 12th, with Barrichello ahead of Button. Despite the problems Button said he believed the team had made "a small step forward". The Hondas were followed by Sato, Speed, Schumacher, Davidson and Liuzzi.

Alonso admitted he was surprised to win a race so early in his McLaren career, adding that winning for two different teams was very special. Hamilton said afterwards that this was his hardest race to date, while Räikkönen admitted he "did not have enough speed on the straight line to try to challenge either [Hamilton or Alonso]". Räikkönen also had to protect his engine from overheating, caused by a water-leak in the closing stages of the Melbourne race, with Räikkönen stating Ferrari had to "play on the safe side of that engine". After their disappointing Malaysian race, Ferrari boss Jean Todt stated that they "will try to do a better job" in the next round in Bahrain.

== Classification ==
=== Qualifying ===
Pos.	No.	Driver	Constructor	Q1	Q2	Q3	Grid
1	5	(Brazil) Felipe Massa	Ferrari	1:35.340	1:34.454	1:35.043	1
2	1	(Spain) Fernando Alonso	McLaren-Mercedes	1:34.942	1:34.057	1:35.310	2
3	6	(Finland) Kimi Räikkönen	Ferrari	1:35.138	1:34.687	1:35.479	3
4	2	(United Kingdom) Lewis Hamilton	McLaren-Mercedes	1:35.028	1:34.650	1:36.045	4
5	9	(Germany) Nick Heidfeld	BMW Sauber	1:35.617	1:35.203	1:36.543	5
6	16	(Germany) Nico Rosberg	Williams-Toyota	1:35.755	1:35.380	1:36.829	6
7	10	(Poland) Robert Kubica	BMW Sauber	1:35.294	1:34.739	1:36.839	7
8	12	(Italy) Jarno Trulli	Toyota	1:35.666	1:35.255	1:36.902	8
9	11	(Germany) Ralf Schumacher	Toyota	1:35.736	1:35.595	1:37.078	9
10	15	(Australia) Mark Webber	Red Bull-Renault	1:35.727	1:35.579	1:37.345	10
11	4	(Finland) Heikki Kovalainen	Renault	1:36.092	1:35.630		11
12	3	(Italy) Giancarlo Fisichella	Renault	1:35.879	1:35.706		12
13	14	(United Kingdom) David Coulthard	Red Bull-Renault	1:35.730	1:35.766		13
14	22	(Japan) Takuma Sato	Super Aguri-Honda	1:36.430	1:35.945		14
15	7	(United Kingdom) Jenson Button	Honda	1:35.913	1:36.088		15
16	18	(Italy) Vitantonio Liuzzi	Toro Rosso-Ferrari	1:36.140	1:36.145		16
17	19	(United States) Scott Speed	Toro Rosso-Ferrari	1:36.578			17
18	23	(United Kingdom) Anthony Davidson	Super Aguri-Honda	1:36.816			18
19	8	(Brazil) Rubens Barrichello	Honda	1:36.827			22^{1}
20	17	(Austria) Alexander Wurz	Williams-Toyota	1:37.326			19
21	21	(Netherlands) Christijan Albers	Spyker-Ferrari	1:38.279			20
22	20	(Germany) Adrian Sutil	Spyker-Ferrari	1:38.415			21

Notes

- ^1 – Rubens Barrichello was given a ten-place grid penalty following an engine change.

=== Race ===
Pos.	No.	Driver	Constructor	Laps	Time/Retired	Grid	Points
1	1	(Spain) Fernando Alonso	McLaren-Mercedes	56	1:32:14.930	2	10
2	2	(United Kingdom) Lewis Hamilton	McLaren-Mercedes	56	+17.557	4	8
3	6	(Finland) Kimi Räikkönen	Ferrari	56	+18.339	3	6
4	9	(Germany) Nick Heidfeld	BMW Sauber	56	+33.777	5	5
5	5	(Brazil) Felipe Massa	Ferrari	56	+36.705	1	4
6	3	(Italy) Giancarlo Fisichella	Renault	56	+1:05.638	12	3
7	12	(Italy) Jarno Trulli	Toyota	56	+1:10.132	8	2
8	4	(Finland) Heikki Kovalainen	Renault	56	+1:12.015	11	1
9	17	(Austria) Alexander Wurz	Williams-Toyota	56	+1:29.924	19	
10	15	(Australia) Mark Webber	Red Bull-Renault	56	+1:33.556	10	
11	8	(Brazil) Rubens Barrichello	Honda	55	+1 lap	PL^{2}	
12	7	(United Kingdom) Jenson Button	Honda	55	+1 lap	15	
13	22	(Japan) Takuma Sato	Super Aguri-Honda	55	+1 lap	14	
14	19	(United States) Scott Speed	Toro Rosso-Ferrari	55	+1 lap	17	
15	11	(Germany) Ralf Schumacher	Toyota	55	+1 lap	9	
16	23	(United Kingdom) Anthony Davidson	Super Aguri-Honda	55	+1 lap	18	
17	18	(Italy) Vitantonio Liuzzi	Toro Rosso-Ferrari	55	+1 lap	16	
18	10	(Poland) Robert Kubica	BMW Sauber	55	+1 lap	7	
Ret	16	(Germany) Nico Rosberg	Williams-Toyota	42	Water leak	6	
Ret	14	(United Kingdom) David Coulthard	Red Bull-Renault	36	Brakes	13	
Ret	21	(Netherlands) Christijan Albers	Spyker-Ferrari	7	Engine	20	
Ret	20	(Germany) Adrian Sutil	Spyker-Ferrari	0	Collision	21	

Notes

- ^2 – Rubens Barrichello started the race from the pitlane.

== Championship standings after the race ==
Drivers' Championship standings

+/–	Pos.	Driver	Points
1	1	(Spain) Fernando Alonso	18
1	2	(Finland) Kimi Räikkönen	16
	3	(United Kingdom) Lewis Hamilton	14
	4	(Germany) Nick Heidfeld	10
	5	(Italy) Giancarlo Fisichella	7

Constructors' Championship standings

+/–	Pos.	Constructor	Points
	1	(United Kingdom) McLaren-Mercedes	32
	2	(Italy) Ferrari	23
	3	(Germany) BMW Sauber	10
	4	(France) Renault	8
1	5	(Japan) Toyota	3

- Note: Only the top five positions are included for both sets of standings.

Previous race: 2007 Australian Grand Prix	FIA Formula One World Championship; 2007 season	Next race: 2007 Bahrain Grand Prix
Previous race: 2006 Malaysian Grand Prix	Malaysian Grand Prix	Next race: 2008 Malaysian Grand Prix
