= 2006 Australian Grand Prix =

Coordinates: 37°50′59″S 144°58′06″E

Race 3 of 18 in the 2006 Formula One World Championship
← Previous race	Next race →
- Albert Park Street Circuit

Race details
- Date: 2 April 2006
- Official name: 2006 Formula 1 Foster's Australian Grand Prix
- Location: Melbourne Grand Prix Circuit; Albert Park, Melbourne, Australia
- Course: Temporary street circuit
- Course length: 5.303 km (3.295 miles)
- Distance: 57 laps, 302.271 km (187.823 miles)
- Scheduled distance: 58 laps, 307.574 km (191.118 miles)
- Weather: Cloudy with sunny breaks. Air temperature 20°C
- Attendance: 103,000

Pole position
Driver	(United Kingdom) Jenson Button	Honda
- Time: 1:25.229

Fastest lap
Driver	(Finland) Kimi Räikkönen	McLaren-Mercedes
- Time: 1:26.045 on lap 57

Podium
First	(Spain) Fernando Alonso	Renault
Second	(Finland) Kimi Räikkönen	McLaren-Mercedes
Third	(Germany) Ralf Schumacher	Toyota

The 2006 Australian Grand Prix (officially the 2006 Formula 1 Foster's Australian Grand Prix) was a Formula One motor race held at the Melbourne Grand Prix Circuit in Albert Park, Melbourne on 2 April 2006. It was the third race of the 2006 Formula One season.

The race was won by Renault's Fernando Alonso (Renault's third win from three races), with the McLaren of Kimi Räikkönen second. Ralf Schumacher finished in third place to take the last podium of his career with the Toyota team. Polesitter Jenson Button retired from the race when his engine blew on the final lap. He eventually stopped roughly ten metres from the finish line, losing a points scoring position (fifth place) in the process.

This was the last race until the 2015 Mexican Grand Prix that neither Ferrari was classified.

== Report ==
=== Background ===
The Australian Grand Prix had been the season opener since 1996, but this race was held later due to the 2006 Commonwealth Games being held in Melbourne at the time of the opening round. A pre-season test scheduled at the Circuit de Barcelona-Catalunya, in Spain from 24–26 February was also rescheduled and moved to the Bahrain International Circuit, in Bahrain. The season was instead opened in Bahrain, and Australia regained its first round of the season slot for 2007.

Murray Walker made a return to the commentary box for a one-off with Australia's Network Ten.

=== Friday drivers ===
The bottom six teams in the 2005 Constructors' Championship and Super Aguri were entitled to run a third car in free practice on Friday. These drivers drove on Friday but did not compete in qualifying or the race.

Constructor	Nat	Driver
Williams-Cosworth	(Austria)	Alexander Wurz
Honda	(United Kingdom)	Anthony Davidson
Red Bull-Ferrari	(Netherlands)	Robert Doornbos
BMW Sauber	(Poland)	Robert Kubica
MF1-Toyota	(Germany)	Markus Winkelhock
Toro Rosso-Cosworth	(Switzerland)	Neel Jani

=== Race ===
Juan Pablo Montoya spun as he completed the formation lap and lined up at the back of the grid. However, Giancarlo Fisichella then stalled his engine on the grid, forcing the start to be aborted. Fisichella had to start from the pit lane, while Montoya reclaimed his original grid position.

On the first lap, Felipe Massa collided with Nico Rosberg and Christian Klien. The Williams and Red Bull sandwiched Massa's Ferrari as the Brazilian attempted to squeeze between them, pitching him into the wall hard and out of the race. Rosberg lost his rear wing, while Klien continued the race unharmed. The safety car was deployed as a result of the incident. Fisichella spun but continued, again in the Jones corner. Alonso passed Button on the start/finish straight when the safety car was recalled two laps later.

On the third lap, Christian Klien crashed heavily near Clark Chicane after a suspension failure. Due to debris on the track, the safety car was deployed again. When the race resumed, Räikkönen attacked and passed Button.

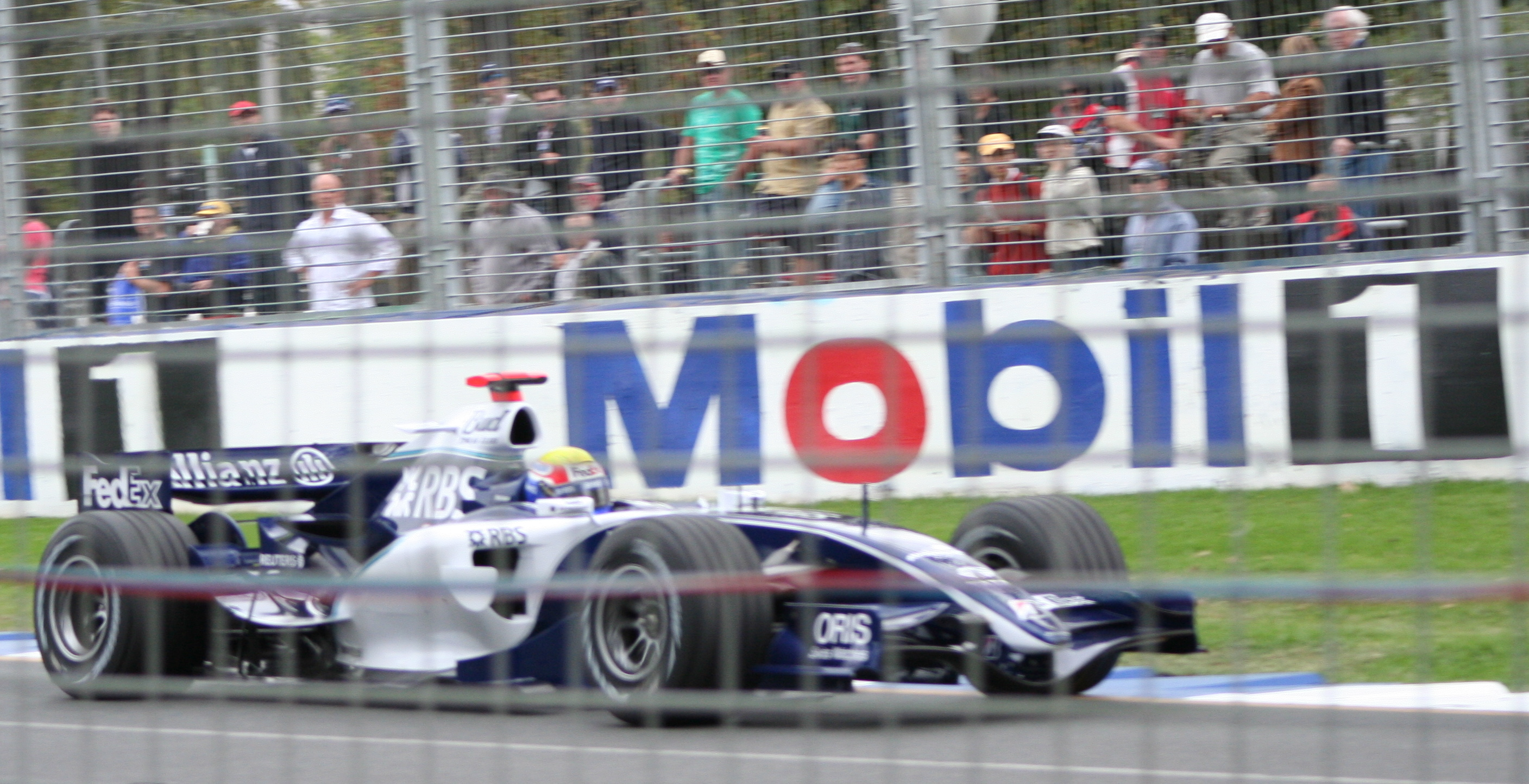
Mark Webber led his home race for Williams

Pit stops began around ten laps later, with Montoya, Button and Trulli pitting first. Alonso and Räikkönen stopped, giving Mark Webber the lead of his home Grand Prix. When Webber took the lead on lap 21 in his Williams-Cosworth he became the first Australian driver to lead his home Grand Prix since John Bowe led the early laps of the non-championship 1984 race driving a Ralt RT4 Ford.

On lap 32, Montoya touched the grass in the Prost turn, but managed to return to the track. Michael Schumacher ran wide at the same spot but lost control and struck the barriers. He said that his car was not easy to drive, and that the tires were not warm enough. This incident led to a third safety car deployment, during which many drivers made pit stops. Räikkönen entered just before Montoya, making a queue.

On lap 35 the safety car was recalled and the race restarted. Alonso left a large gap to the safety car to slow down the cars behind, before accelerating to create a 3-second gap between the two leading cars.

The 36th lap saw the safety car deployed once again, after Vitantonio Liuzzi crashed heavily near Whiteford. Liuzzi blamed Villeneuve for his crash. The race restarted on lap 40, and Alonso employed the same strategy as he had at the previous restart to gain a small lead over Räikkönen.

On lap 39, Tiago Monteiro retired with a mechanical problem. Lap 46 saw Montoya retired with an electrical problem, caused when he ran wide and bounced over a kerb.

On the final lap, two corners from the chequered flag, Jenson Button's engine blew, causing Fisichella right behind him to be covered in oil and struggling to control the car. Button pulled off the track about 10 metres from the finish line. He did so deliberately, giving up a points-scoring position, to avoid a 10-place position penalty in the next race.

Alonso wrapped up his tenth career victory, while Räikkönen took second place on the podium and Ralf Schumacher scored what proved to be the sole podium for Toyota in the season, and ultimately, his final podium in Formula One. This was despite a drive-through penalty for speeding in the pit lane.

=== Post-race ===
After the race, the stewards issued a reprimand to Takuma Sato for failing to pay attention to blue flags, and a 25-second penalty to Scott Speed for failing to heed yellow flags. The American driver was also fined $5000 for using abusive language during a post-race hearing.

== Classification ==
=== Qualifying ===
Pos.	No.	Driver	Constructor	Q1	Q2	Q3	Grid
1	12	(United Kingdom) Jenson Button	Honda	1:28.081	1:26.337	1:25.229	1
2	2	(Italy) Giancarlo Fisichella	Renault	1:27.765	1:26.196	1:25.635	2
3	1	(Spain) Fernando Alonso	Renault	1:28.569	1:25.729	1:25.778	3
4	3	(Finland) Kimi Räikkönen	McLaren-Mercedes	1:27.193	1:26.161	1:25.822	4
5	4	(Colombia) Juan Pablo Montoya	McLaren-Mercedes	1:27.079	1:25.902	1:25.976	5
6	7	(Germany) Ralf Schumacher	Toyota	1:28.007	1:26.596	1:26.612	6
7	9	(Australia) Mark Webber	Williams-Cosworth	1:27.669	1:26.075	1:26.937	7
8	16	(Germany) Nick Heidfeld	BMW Sauber	1:27.796	1:26.014	1:27.579	8
9	17	(Canada) Jacques Villeneuve	BMW Sauber	1:28.460	1:26.714	1:29.239	19^{1}
10	8	(Italy) Jarno Trulli	Toyota	1:27.748	1:26.327	No time^{2}	9
11	5	(Germany) Michael Schumacher	Ferrari	1:28.228	1:26.718		10
12	14	(United Kingdom) David Coulthard	Red Bull-Ferrari	1:28.408	1:27.023		11
13	20	(Italy) Vitantonio Liuzzi	Toro Rosso-Cosworth	1:28.999	1:27.219		12
14	15	(Austria) Christian Klien	Red Bull-Ferrari	1:28.757	1:27.591		13
15	10	(Germany) Nico Rosberg	Williams-Cosworth	1:28.351	1:29.422		14
16	6	(Brazil) Felipe Massa	Ferrari	1:28.868	No time^{3}		15
17	11	(Brazil) Rubens Barrichello	Honda	1:29.943			16
18	19	(Netherlands) Christijan Albers	MF1-Toyota	1:30.226			17
19	21	(United States) Scott Speed	Toro Rosso-Cosworth	1:30.426			18
20	18	(Portugal) Tiago Monteiro	MF1-Toyota	1:30.709			20
21	22	(Japan) Takuma Sato	Super Aguri-Honda	1:32.279			21
22	23	(Japan) Yuji Ide	Super Aguri-Honda	1:36.164			22

Notes

- ^1 – Jacques Villeneuve was handed a 10 place grid penalty following an engine change before qualifying.
- ^2 – Jarno Trulli qualified for the final session however did not completed a timed lap due to gearbox problems.
- ^3 – Felipe Massa lost control of his Ferrari during the second qualifying session (Q2) after running over a curb through turn 11 and crashing his car into the wall. It also prompted the session to be red flagged for some time.

=== Race ===
Pos	No	Driver	Constructor	Tyre	Laps	Time/Retired	Grid	Points
1	1	(Spain) Fernando Alonso	Renault	M	57	1:34:27.870	3	10
2	3	(Finland) Kimi Räikkönen	McLaren-Mercedes	M	57	+1.829	4	8
3	7	(Germany) Ralf Schumacher	Toyota	B	57	+24.824	6	6
4	16	(Germany) Nick Heidfeld	BMW Sauber	M	57	+31.032	8	5
5	2	(Italy) Giancarlo Fisichella	Renault	M	57	+38.421	PL^{4}	4
6	17	(Canada) Jacques Villeneuve	BMW Sauber	M	57	+49.554	19	3
7	11	(Brazil) Rubens Barrichello	Honda	M	57	+51.904	16	2
8	14	(United Kingdom) David Coulthard	Red Bull-Ferrari	M	57	+53.983	11	1
9	21	(United States) Scott Speed	Toro Rosso-Cosworth	M	57	+1:18.817^{5}	18	
10	12	(United Kingdom) Jenson Button	Honda	M	56	Engine	1	
11	19	(Netherlands) Christijan Albers	MF1-Toyota	B	56	+1 lap	17	
12	22	(Japan) Takuma Sato	Super Aguri-Honda	B	55	+2 laps	21	
13	23	(Japan) Yuji Ide	Super Aguri-Honda	B	54	+3 laps	22	
Ret	4	(Colombia) Juan Pablo Montoya	McLaren-Mercedes	M	46	Electrical	5	
Ret	18	(Portugal) Tiago Monteiro	MF1-Toyota	B	39	Hydraulics	20	
Ret	20	(Italy) Vitantonio Liuzzi	Toro Rosso-Cosworth	M	37	Accident	12	
Ret	5	(Germany) Michael Schumacher	Ferrari	B	32	Accident	10	
Ret	9	(Australia) Mark Webber	Williams-Cosworth	B	22	Transmission	7	
Ret	15	(Austria) Christian Klien	Red Bull-Ferrari	M	4	Accident	13	
Ret	8	(Italy) Jarno Trulli	Toyota	B	0	Collision	9	
Ret	10	(Germany) Nico Rosberg	Williams-Cosworth	B	0	Collision damage	14	
Ret	6	(Brazil) Felipe Massa	Ferrari	B	0	Collision	15	

Notes

- ^4 – Giancarlo Fisichella stalled causing the first start to be aborted and started the race proper from the pitlane.
- ^5 – Scott Speed finished eighth but had 25 seconds added to his race time when he overtook David Coulthard under yellow flags.
- Jenson Button was classified as he completed more than 90% of the race distance as he retired on the last lap.

== Championship standings after the race ==
Drivers' Championship standings

	Pos.	Driver	Points
	1	(Spain) Fernando Alonso	28
2	2	(Italy) Giancarlo Fisichella	14
3	3	(Finland) Kimi Räikkönen	14
2	4	(Germany) Michael Schumacher	11
2	5	(United Kingdom) Jenson Button	11

Constructors' Championship standings

	Pos.	Constructor	Points
	1	(France) Renault	42
1	2	(United Kingdom) McLaren-Mercedes	23
1	3	(Italy) Ferrari	15
	4	(Japan) Honda	13
1	5	(Germany) BMW Sauber	10

- Note: Only the top five positions are included for both sets of standings.

Previous race: 2006 Malaysian Grand Prix	FIA Formula One World Championship; 2006 season	Next race: 2006 San Marino Grand Prix
Previous race: 2005 Australian Grand Prix	Australian Grand Prix	Next race: 2007 Australian Grand Prix
