= Williams FW27 =

Formula One Car for 2005 season

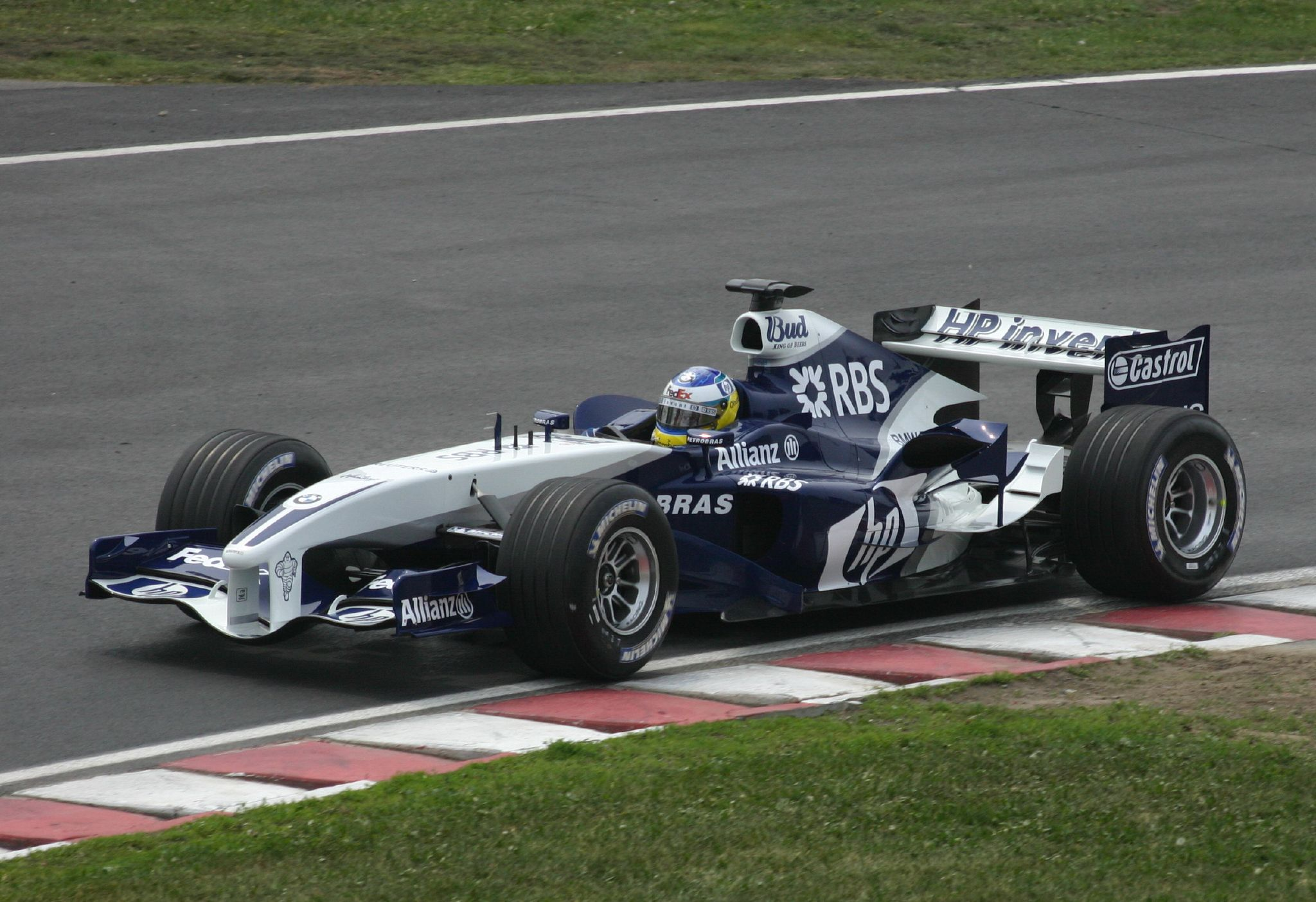
- Williams FW27, driven by Nick Heidfeld, during the 2005 Canadian Grand Prix
- Category: Formula One
- Constructor: Williams
- Designers: Patrick Head (Engineering Director); Sam Michael (Technical Director); Gavin Fisher (Chief Designer); Brian O'Roarke (Chief Composites Engineer); Mark Tatham (Chief Mechanical Engineer); Steve Wise (Head of Electronics); Loïc Bigois (Chief Aerodynamicist); Heinz Paschen (Technical Engine Director - BMW); Angelo Camerini (Chief Designer, Engine - BMW)
- Predecessor: Williams FW26
- Successor: Williams FW28

Technical specifications
- Chassis: Carbon-fibre and honeycomb composite structure
- Suspension (front): Torsion bar
- Suspension (rear): Torsion bar
- Engine: BMW P84/5 3.0 L (183.1 cu in) 90° V10 Naturally Aspirated Mid-mounted
- Transmission: Williams 6-speed transverse semi-automatic
- Power: > 950 hp @ 19,000 rpm
- Fuel: Petrobras; Castrol lubrication
- Tyres: Michelin

Competition history
- Notable entrants: BMW-Williams F1 Team
- Notable drivers: 7. (Australia) Mark Webber; 8. (Germany) Nick Heidfeld; 8. (Brazil) Antônio Pizzonia
- Debut: 2005 Australian Grand Prix
- Last event: 2005 Chinese Grand Prix
Races	Wins	Podiums	Poles	F/Laps
19	0	4	1	0
- Constructors' Championships: 0
- Drivers' Championships: 0

The Williams FW27 was the Formula One car which the Williams team used during the 2005 Formula One season.

== Design and development ==
=== Overview ===
Like the Minardi PS05 and the Renault R25, the FW27 utilized a 6-speed gearbox rather than the 7-speed gearbox found on the other 2005 F1 cars.

This car was the last Williams model that was powered by a BMW engine before BMW moved to BMW Sauber and also Michelin tyres before their switch to Bridgestone tyres. The following year's model, the Williams FW28 had an engine provided by Cosworth.

=== Variants ===
The Williams FW27B was prepared for the purpose of testing the BMW V8 engine for the 2006 season, but Cosworth was ultimately chosen when BMW left Williams to buy the Sauber team. The Williams FW27C was prepared for the purpose of testing the 2006 Cosworth V8 engine. At the time the Williams team had not confirmed a major team sponsor, so the livery of both the FW27C car and the race suit were both in dark blue, with only the RBS sponsor branding added.

== Racing history ==
While Williams was able to compete and take a couple of victories home in recent years, the FW27 proved not to be up to the same performance levels as some of the other teams' cars. New drivers Mark Webber and Nick Heidfeld scored points quite frequently, but a Grand Prix win was not within their reach. The highlight was the second and third places in Monaco. Heidfeld also scored a second place at the European race, where he started from pole. From the Italian Grand Prix onwards, Heidfeld, who was injured, was replaced by Antônio Pizzonia, who had previously been Webber's teammate at Jaguar in 2003. The team ended the season winless for the first time since 2000 in fifth place in the Constructors' Championship, failing to meet their own high expectations.

== Sponsorship and livery ==
BMW-Williams went into 2005 season with renewed major sponsorships such as Allianz, FedEx, Hewlett-Packard, Reuters, Oris, Hamleys, Budweiser, Petrobras and Castrol. The team received new RBS sponsorship while NiQuitin Co., CCTV and Shanghai Circuit were discontinued. The livery was similar to 2004 design with subtle changes.

At the European and German Grands Prix, the "Budweiser" logo was simplified as "Bud" due to the licensing issues from its parent company, Anheuser-Busch. At the French and Turkish Grands Prix, the Budweiser logo was completely removed. In these competitions, Budweiser was replaced by SeaWorld.

== Other use ==
On 27 September 2005, future four-time world champion Sebastian Vettel conducted his first ever test in a Formula One car in a Williams FW27 at the Circuito de Jerez.

== Complete Formula One results ==
(key) (results in bold indicate pole position.)

Year	Team	Engine	Tyres	Drivers	1	2	3	4	5	6	7	8	9	10	11	12	13	14	15	16	17	18	19	Points	WCC
2005	BMW-Williams F1 Team	BMW P84/5 V10	**M**		AUS	MAL	BHR	SMR	ESP	MON	EUR	CAN	USA	FRA	GBR	GER	HUN	TUR	ITA	BEL	BRA	JPN	CHN	66	5th
2005	BMW-Williams F1 Team	BMW P84/5 V10	**M**	(Australia) Mark Webber	5	Ret	6	7	6	3	Ret	5	DNS	12	11	NC	7	Ret	14	4	NC	4	7	66	5th
2005	BMW-Williams F1 Team	BMW P84/5 V10	**M**	(Germany) Nick Heidfeld	Ret	3	Ret	6	10	2	**2**	Ret	DNS	14	12	11	6	Ret	PO					66	5th
2005	BMW-Williams F1 Team	BMW P84/5 V10	**M**	(Brazil) Antônio Pizzonia	TD	TD	TD	TD	TD	TD	TD	TD	TD	TD	TD	TD	TD	TD	7	15^{†}	Ret	Ret	13^{†}	66	5th

== Sponsors ==
Brand	Country	Placed on
HP	United States	Front wing, rear wing, sidepods
RBS	United Kingdom	Front wing, nose, fin
Castrol	United Kingdom	Rear wing end plate
Petrobras	Brazil	Mirrors, nosecone
Reuters	United Kingdom	Sidepods, nose
Allianz	Germany	Front wing end plate, cockpit side
BMW	Germany	Nosecone, fin
FedEx	United States	Front wing
Budweiser	United States	Fin, nose
Hamleys	United Kingdom	Nose
Oris	Switzerland	Rear wing end plate

== Gallery ==
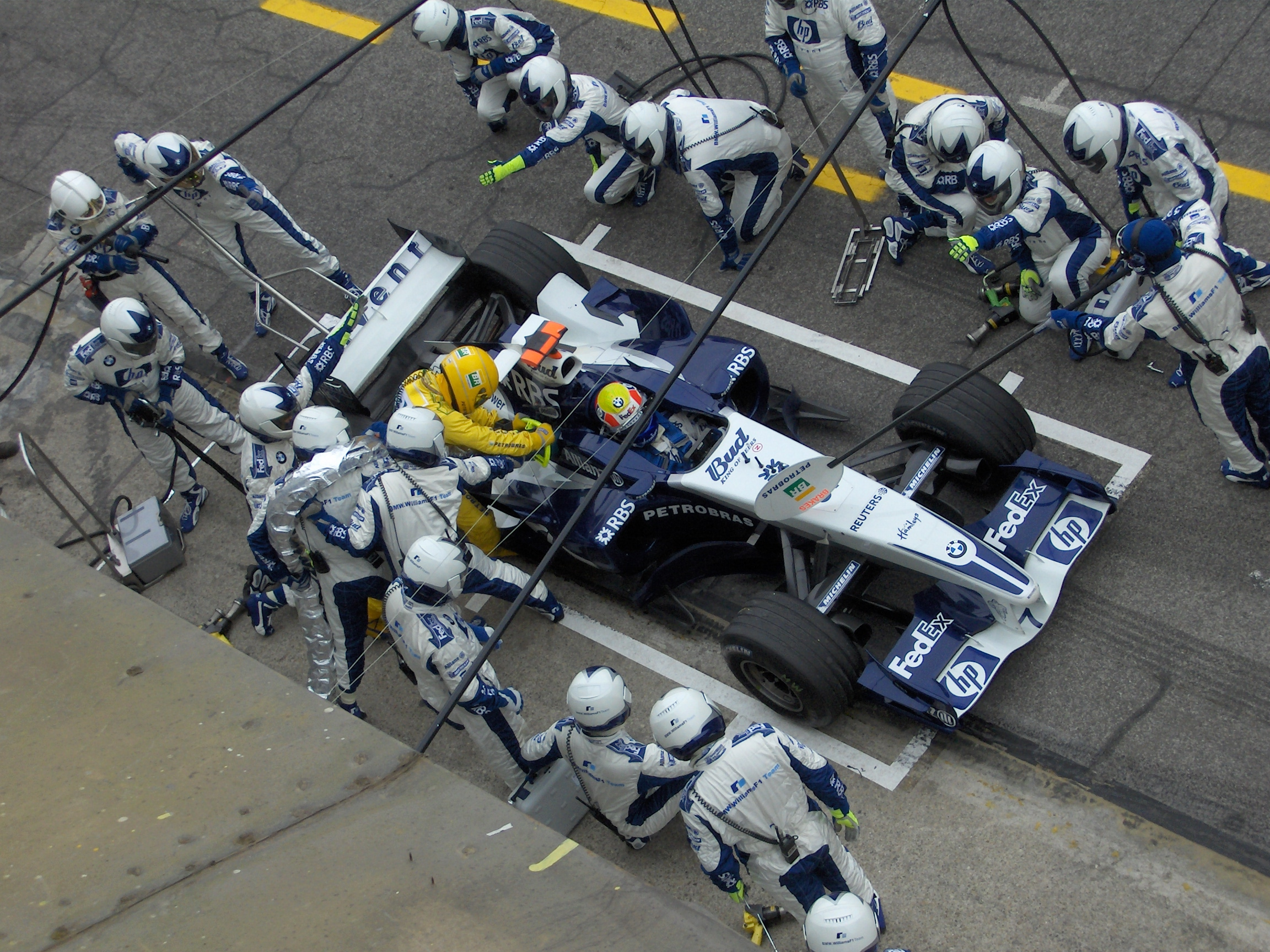
Mark Webber makes a pitstop at the 2005 San Marino Grand Prix

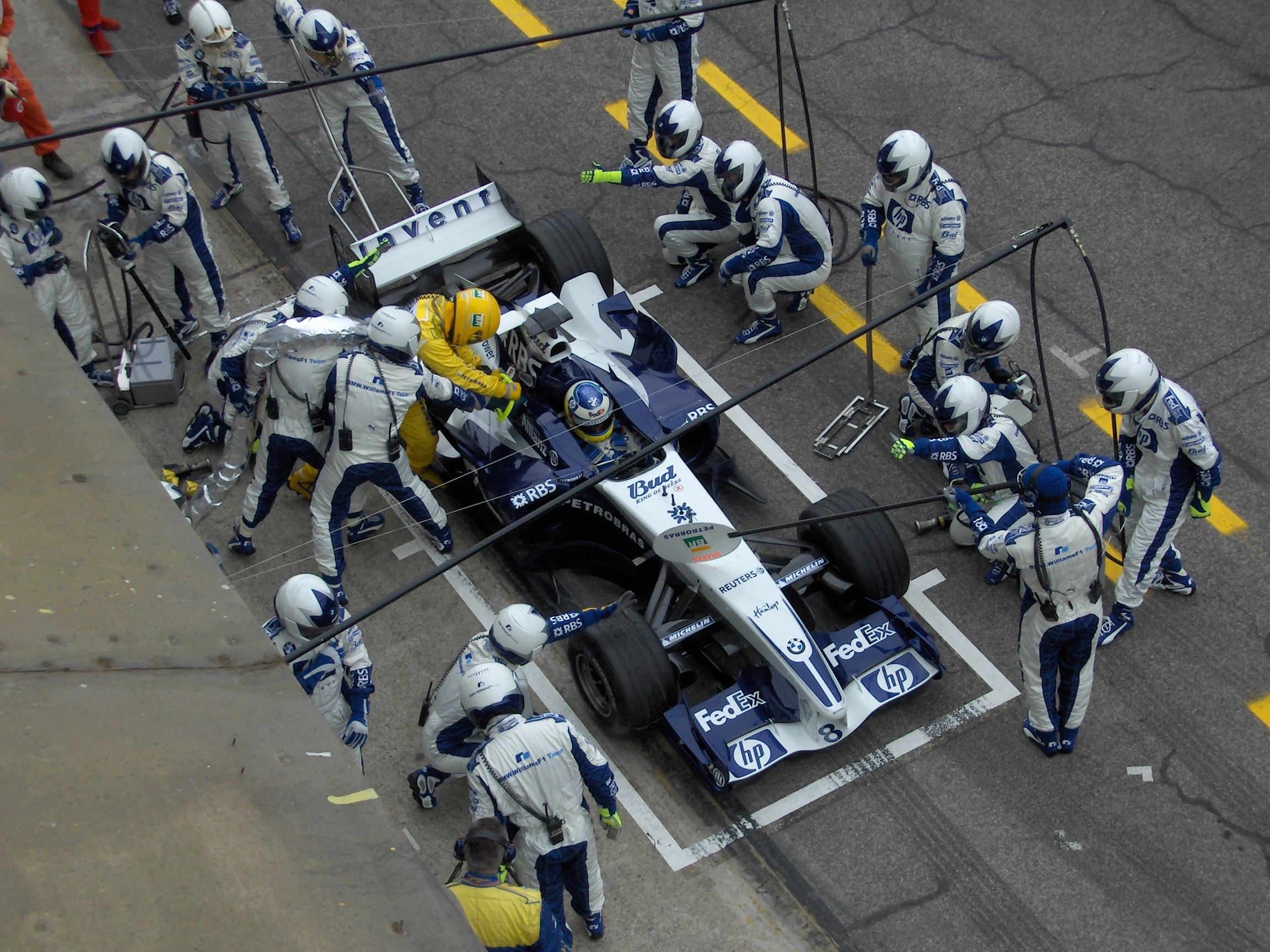
Nick Heidfeld makes a pitstop at the 2005 San Marino Grand Prix

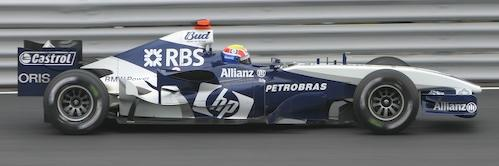
Webber at the 2005 Canadian Grand Prix

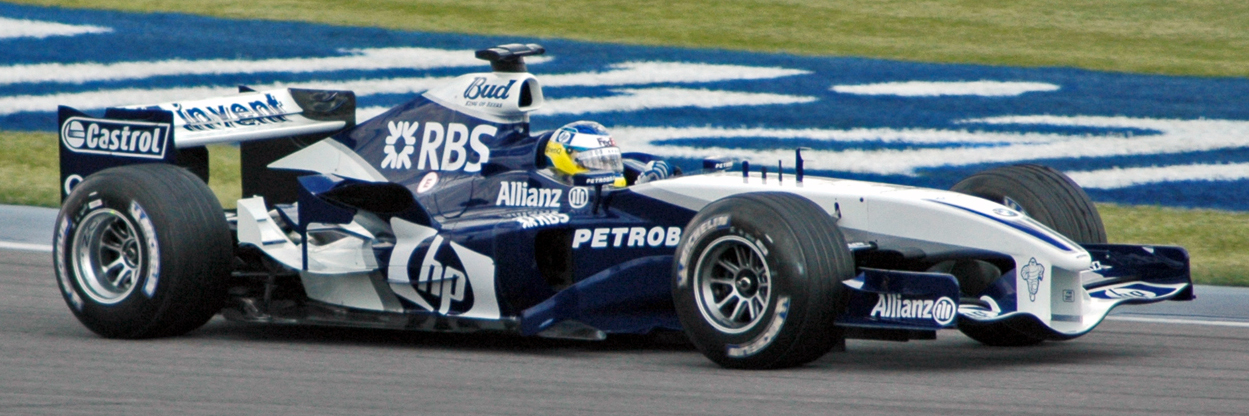
Heidfeld during the 2005 United States Grand Prix practice session

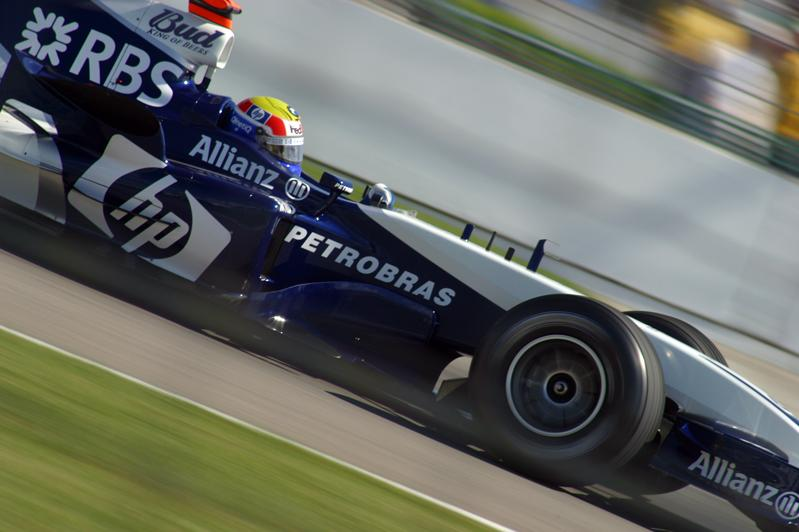
Webber at the 2005 United States Grand Prix
