= 2006 Malaysian Grand Prix =

Coordinates: 2°45′39″N 101°44′18″E

Race 2 of 18 in the 2006 Formula One World Championship
← Previous race	Next race →
- Sepang International Circuit

Race details
- Date: 19 March 2006
- Official name: 2006 Formula 1 Petronas Malaysian Grand Prix
- Location: Sepang International Circuit; Sepang, Selangor, Malaysia
- Course: Permanent racing facility
- Course length: 5.543 km (3.444 miles)
- Distance: 56 laps, 310.408 km (192.879 miles)
- Weather: Fine, Air Temp: 33°C, Wind Speed: 1.5 m/s, Humidity: 61%
- Attendance: 107,634 (Weekend)

Pole position
Driver	(Italy) Giancarlo Fisichella	Renault
- Time: 1:33.840

Fastest lap
Driver	(Spain) Fernando Alonso	Renault
- Time: 1:34.803 on lap 45

Podium
First	(Italy) Giancarlo Fisichella	Renault
Second	(Spain) Fernando Alonso	Renault
Third	(United Kingdom) Jenson Button	Honda

The 2006 Malaysian Grand Prix (officially the 2006 Formula 1 Petronas Malaysian Grand Prix) was a Formula One motor race held at the Sepang International Circuit in Selangor, Malaysia on 19 March 2006. The 56-lap race was the second round of the 2006 Formula One season and the eighth running of the Malaysian Grand Prix as a World Championship race.

It was won by Renault driver Giancarlo Fisichella, who took his third and final victory in Formula One, and scored his first points of the season. He had also started on pole position. His team-mate, Fernando Alonso, finished second to extend his lead in the drivers' championship standings to 7 points. Jenson Button took the first podium in Honda's three year return to the sport by finishing in third place. Fisichella's victory was the last for an Italian driver until Andrea Kimi Antonelli won the 2026 Chinese Grand Prix. This was the first 1–2 finish for Renault since their return to F1 as a constructor in 2002, their first 1–2 finish overall since the 1982 French Grand Prix (with René Arnoux and Alain Prost). It was also the first 1–2 finish between Renault-powered drivers since the 1997 Luxembourg Grand Prix (with Jacques Villeneuve and Heinz-Harald Frentzen, both from the Williams).

== Report ==
=== Friday drivers ===
The bottom 6 teams in the 2005 Constructors' Championship and Super Aguri were entitled to run a third car in free practice on Friday. These drivers drove on Friday but did not compete in qualifying or the race.

Constructor	Nat	Driver
Williams-Cosworth	(Austria)	Alexander Wurz
Honda	(United Kingdom)	Anthony Davidson
Red Bull-Ferrari	(Netherlands)	Robert Doornbos
BMW Sauber	(Poland)	Robert Kubica
MF1-Toyota	(Switzerland)	Giorgio Mondini
Toro Rosso-Cosworth	(Switzerland)	Neel Jani
Super Aguri-Honda		-

=== Qualifying ===
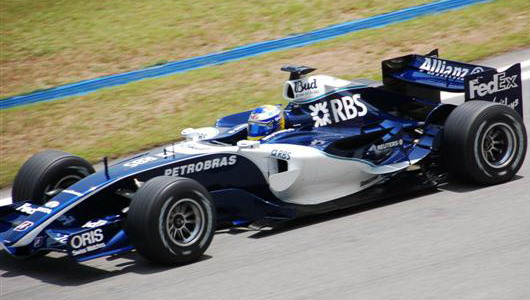
Nico Rosberg qualified third in only his second race.

The first session gave no surprises, as the Super Aguri, Midland and Toro Rosso cars all went out, while the second session saw another set of poor performances from Rubens Barrichello and Jarno Trulli, while Massa and Coulthard also went out along with both the Sauber cars. In the final pole position session, Ralf Schumacher's engine blew, while Fernando Alonso could only manage 7th place after a problem with his fuel calculation meant he was carrying too much fuel during the session. Kimi Räikkönen was tipped as a favourite having qualified 6th, while Juan Pablo Montoya put himself on the third row alongside his teammate in 5th. The two big surprises of qualifying were Nico Rosberg and Mark Webber in their Williams. Rosberg posted the third fastest time, while Webber was moved up to 4th after Michael Schumacher's engine penalty dropped him to 14th. Jenson Button took provisional pole, but it was Giancarlo Fisichella who ended the session in 1st with his Renault, demoting Button to 2nd.

Qualifying on Saturday saw the new rules being put to the test, as David Coulthard, Felipe Massa, Michael Schumacher, Rubens Barrichello and Ralf Schumacher were all forced to swap engines from the Bahrain GP and therefore lost 10 places on the starting grid after qualifying, despite many of them competing in later sessions (Massa actually changed his engine twice, causing him to lose 20 places). This meant some drivers, such as the Toro Rosso's of Scott Speed and Vitantonio Liuzzi were eliminated in the first session, but would have been spared elimination had those with engine penalties been eliminated at this point (although Ralf Schumacher's engine blew during the last session). Three cars with the Ferrari V8 suffered from engine problems during qualifying.

=== Race ===
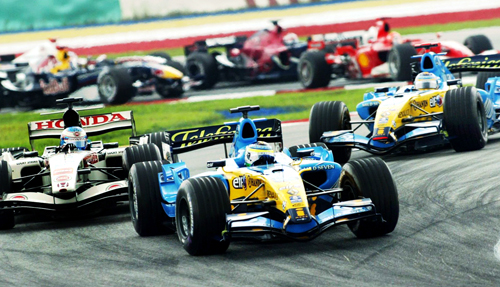
Giancarlo Fisichella led at the start of the race.

It was a slightly cooler day than previously, a little overcast and with a possibility of rain later in the race. The track and air temperatures were in the mid thirties but the humidity was still very high for 56 laps of the Sepang circuit.

At the start, pole-sitter Fisichella made a clean getaway, as did second-placed Button. The Williams drivers were having a little battle of their own, Nico Rosberg pushing Mark Webber wide as he tried to defend his third spot, and a flying Alonso took advantage as they squabbled. The Spaniard went round the outside of turn one to take third.

Kimi Räikkönen was a first lap casualty when his McLaren rear ended into the barriers with a suspected suspension failure, thanks to a nerf from behind by Christian Klien's Red Bull. It was hard to see what happened but Klien was in the pits quickly afterwards with suspension damage to the front of his car. Red Bull's David Coulthard was up to 11th from 19th, the Toyota of Ralf Schumacher from 22nd to 13th, Ferrari's Felipe Massa from 21st to 14th and Rubens Barrichello moved his Honda up from 20th to 15th.

Michael Schumacher, who dropped 10 places in qualifying due to his engine change, started 14th and got his Ferrari up to 10th in the opening laps. At the front it was Fisichella leading Button and Alonso, then came Webber and the remaining McLaren of Juan Pablo Montoya.

BMW Sauber's Nick Heidfeld had a good start and had improved to sixth, followed by Rosberg, who had dropped down a little after the skirmish with Webber at the start. Rosberg got past Heidfeld but the move and his efforts in qualifying came to nothing when the Cosworth V8 let go in a cloud of smoke and flames a couple of laps later. Webber was closing on Alonso and Heidfeld was back to sixth, with Montoya still between him and Webber. Rosberg's exit had promoted the second BMW Sauber of Jacques Villeneuve into eighth, while Michael and Coulthard had moved up to complete the top 10.

Ralf and Massa were also still improving, 11th and 12th respectively, but for Red Bull it was game over. They had managed to get Klien back out on track after the incident with Räikkönen but he had problems. Meanwhile, Coulthard had gone into the pits stuck in sixth gear and their respective woes ended in a double retirement for the team. Back on track Michael had dispatched Villeneuve for seventh and Fisichella was belting out fastest laps at the front. Behind Ralf and Massa, 10th and 11th by then, was the Toro Rosso of Scott Speed and Barrichello, who was struggling to make up ground as quickly as his fellow back-of-the-grid starters had done.

Trulli, who was running sixth, hardly seemed to put up a fight as he was overtaken by Michael, Villeneuve and Massa all in successive laps at the same corner, turn one. Webber and Ralf were the ones who kicked off the first pit stops, around lap 15, but Webber then exited the race with a hydraulic problem.

Fisichella went in for his first stop a couple of laps later, leaving Button in the lead until the Honda also dived in. That promoted Alonso to the front, but while the Spaniard went 10 laps further into the race than teammate Fisichella did before visiting the pits, he was still on a two-stopper.

Further down the field MF1's Christijan Albers was up to 13th, followed by the Super Aguri of Takuma Sato and Tonio Liuzzi's Toro Rosso. The second MF1 of Tiago Monteiro was next and the last of the remaining cars on track was Yuji Ide's Super Aguri. They were all having their own little fights but the attention was firmly on the front.

Alonso led Fisichella and Button rejoined behind third-placed Montoya after his stop. He was pressuring the McLaren, but not really too hard as Montoya was yet to pit. Heidfeld was doing a calm and controlled job in fifth, followed by Michael, Villeneuve and Massa up into the points in eighth.

However, due to the different strategies the pit stop shakeout was not yet complete. Next into the pits were Michael, Montoya and Villeneuve, which left Alonso, Massa and Barrichello the last to go in. Alonso finally ducked in on lap 26 but evidently would have to stop again. He rejoined third behind Fisichella and Button.

Massa was up to fourth when he went in and rejoined eighth, and the Ferrari youngster did not have to stop again. Barrichello was also on a one-stopper and was last to make his way into the pits but the strategy was wasted when a few laps later he got a 10-second stop and go penalty for speeding in the pit lane.

Ide was the next to retire, with an unspecified mechanical problem, and the Super Aguri pulled off on the grass. Barrichello, who had been held up by a scrap between Sato and Monteiro, went in for his penalty, and Button got similarly stuck behind Sato and one of the Toro Rosso cars who were then having a duel.

Fisichella took his second stop and Button dived in as well to escape the traffic. They retained formation and rejoined in second and fourth with Montoya in between them. Alonso was back in the lead until his second stop and had just enough time in his pocket to charge through for a quick splash-and-dash and get out ahead of Button.

Michael went in for his second stop and it was a close call with teammate Massa as he rejoined the track. The Brazilian did not back off and led Michael through turn one, although the German was very close. Massa stayed there to the chequered flag, with Michael tagging behind for the remaining 10 laps or so, unable to get past.

With only eight laps to go Heidfeld, who had been doing a sterling, if quiet, job for BMW in fifth, suffered an engine failure. In the final laps Liuzzi got past Albers for 11th, which will probably make MF1 start complaining about Toro Rosso's V10 again, and somewhere along the line Speed retired with a suspected clutch problem. Positions held to the flag and Fisichella took the victory ahead of teammate Alonso and Button.

== Classification ==
=== Qualifying ===
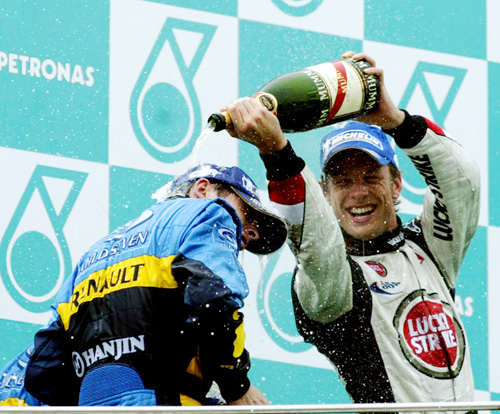
Jenson Button pouring champagne on Giancarlo Fisichella during the podium ceremony after the race.

Pos.	No.	Driver	Constructor	Q1	Q2	Q3	Grid
1	2	(Italy) Giancarlo Fisichella	Renault	1:35.488	1:33.623	1:33.840	1
2	12	(United Kingdom) Jenson Button	Honda	1:35.023	1:33.527	1:33.986	2
3	10	(Germany) Nico Rosberg	Williams-Cosworth	1:35.105	1:34.563	1:34.626	3
4	5	(Germany) Michael Schumacher	Ferrari	1:35.810	1:34.574	1:34.668	14^{1}
5	9	(Australia) Mark Webber	Williams-Cosworth	1:35.252	1:34.279	1:34.672	4
6	4	(Colombia) Juan Pablo Montoya	McLaren-Mercedes	1:34.536	1:34.568	1:34.916	5
7	3	(Finland) Kimi Räikkönen	McLaren-Mercedes	1:34.667	1:34.351	1:34.983	6
8	1	(Spain) Fernando Alonso	Renault	1:35.514	1:33.997	1:35.747	7
9	15	(Austria) Christian Klien	Red Bull-Ferrari	1:35.171	1:34.537	1:38.715	8
10	7	(Germany) Ralf Schumacher	Toyota	1:35.214	1:34.586	No time^{2}	22^{2}
11	14	(United Kingdom) David Coulthard	Red Bull-Ferrari	1:34.839	1:34.614		19^{3}
12	11	(Brazil) Rubens Barrichello	Honda	1:35.526	1:34.683		20^{3}
13	8	(Italy) Jarno Trulli	Toyota	1:35.517	1:34.702		9
14	17	(Canada) Jacques Villeneuve	BMW Sauber	1:35.391	1:34.752		10
15	16	(Germany) Nick Heidfeld	BMW Sauber	1:35.588	1:34.783		11
16	6	(Brazil) Felipe Massa	Ferrari	1:35.091	No time^{4}		21^{4}
17	21	(United States) Scott Speed	Toro Rosso-Cosworth	1:36.297			12
18	20	(Italy) Vitantonio Liuzzi	Toro Rosso-Cosworth	1:36.581			13
19	19	(Netherlands) Christijan Albers	MF1-Toyota	1:37.426			15
20	18	(Portugal) Tiago Monteiro	MF1-Toyota	1:37.819			16
21	22	(Japan) Takuma Sato	Super Aguri-Honda	1:39.011			17
22	23	(Japan) Yuji Ide	Super Aguri-Honda	1:40.720			18

Notes

- ^1 — Michael Schumacher was handed a 10 place grid penalty following an engine change after the Saturday morning practice session.
- ^2 — Ralf Schumacher was handed a 10 place grid penalty following an engine change after his engine blew during the second session. Resultantly he was unable to compete in the final part of qualifying - Q3.
- ^3 — David Coulthard and Rubens Barrichello were also handed 10 place grid penalties following engine changes.
- ^4 — Felipe Massa was handed a 10 place grid penalty following an engine change prior to the qualifying session. To conserve the engine he sat out the second qualifying session - Q2.

=== Race ===
Pos	No	Driver	Constructor	Tyre	Laps	Time/Retired	Grid	Points
1	2	(Italy) Giancarlo Fisichella	Renault	M	56	1:30:40.529	1	10
2	1	(Spain) Fernando Alonso	Renault	M	56	+4.585	7	8
3	12	(United Kingdom) Jenson Button	Honda	M	56	+9.631	2	6
4	4	(Colombia) Juan Pablo Montoya	McLaren-Mercedes	M	56	+39.351	5	5
5	6	(Brazil) Felipe Massa	Ferrari	B	56	+43.254	21	4
6	5	(Germany) Michael Schumacher	Ferrari	B	56	+43.854	14	3
7	17	(Canada) Jacques Villeneuve	BMW Sauber	M	56	+1:20.461	10	2
8	7	(Germany) Ralf Schumacher	Toyota	B	56	+1:21.288	22	1
9	8	(Italy) Jarno Trulli	Toyota	B	55	+1 Lap	9	
10	11	(Brazil) Rubens Barrichello	Honda	M	55	+1 Lap	20	
11	20	(Italy) Vitantonio Liuzzi	Toro Rosso-Cosworth	M	54	+2 Laps	13	
12	19	(Netherlands) Christijan Albers	MF1-Toyota	B	54	+2 Laps	15	
13	18	(Portugal) Tiago Monteiro	MF1-Toyota	B	54	+2 Laps	16	
14	22	(Japan) Takuma Sato	Super Aguri-Honda	B	53	+3 Laps	17	
Ret	16	(Germany) Nick Heidfeld	BMW Sauber	M	48	Engine	11	
Ret	21	(United States) Scott Speed	Toro Rosso-Cosworth	M	41	Clutch	12	
Ret	23	(Japan) Yuji Ide	Super Aguri-Honda	B	33	Throttle	18	
Ret	15	(Austria) Christian Klien	Red Bull-Ferrari	M	26	Hydraulics	8	
Ret	9	(Australia) Mark Webber	Williams-Cosworth	B	15	Hydraulics	4	
Ret	14	(United Kingdom) David Coulthard	Red Bull-Ferrari	M	10	Hydraulics	19	
Ret	10	(Germany) Nico Rosberg	Williams-Cosworth	B	6	Engine	3	
Ret	3	(Finland) Kimi Räikkönen	McLaren-Mercedes	M	0	Collision	6	

== Championship standings after the race ==
Drivers' Championship standings

	Pos.	Driver	Points
	1	(Spain) Fernando Alonso	18
	2	(Germany) Michael Schumacher	11
1	3	(United Kingdom) Jenson Button	11
17	4	(Italy) Giancarlo Fisichella	10
	5	(Colombia) Juan Pablo Montoya	9

Constructors' Championship standings

	Pos.	Constructor	Points
	1	(France) Renault	28
1	2	(Italy) Ferrari	15
1	3	(United Kingdom) McLaren-Mercedes	15
	4	(Japan) Honda	11
	5	(United Kingdom) Williams-Cosworth	5

- Note: Only the top five positions are included for both sets of standings.

Previous race: 2006 Bahrain Grand Prix	FIA Formula One World Championship; 2006 season	Next race: 2006 Australian Grand Prix
Previous race: 2005 Malaysian Grand Prix	Malaysian Grand Prix	Next race: 2007 Malaysian Grand Prix
