= Test driver =

Motor vehicle operator during development

In motorsport, it is common to have one or more test drivers who work with the mechanics to help develop the vehicle by testing new systems on the track. A reserve driver may fulfil these roles whilst also being prepared to replace a team's main drivers in their absence.

== In specific motorsports ==
=== Formula One ===
In Formula One, the term third driver is used to designate a test driver. Third drivers do not compete in Grands Prix, but are used by teams to help the race drivers and engineers with car development.

Third drivers can only be used in Friday practice sessions during a Formula One Grand Prix meeting, replacing one of the team's two race drivers. With in-season testing currently heavily restricted in Formula One, this can be an opportunity to give new or younger drivers a chance to test the car. Teams have also been known to use third drivers for publicity reasons, sometimes by fielding a local driver, but as this opportunity comes at the expense of practice time and the chance to work on car set-up for one of the race drivers, its value to the team must be considered carefully.

In the 2003 Formula One season, new rules concerning third drivers were introduced, which allowed teams finishing lower than fourth in the previous season's World Constructors' Championship to run a third car and driver during Friday Practice sessions. Renault opted to take advantage of these new rules and subsequently had a successful season. Similarly, in the 2004 Formula One season, BAR ran third driver Anthony Davidson and finished second in the World Constructors' Championship. In the 2005 Formula One season McLaren ran third drivers and also had a successful season. Despite this, not all teams opted to take advantage of the third driver rule, with some teams saying that it was too expensive to run a third car on a Friday.

Starting with the 2007 season, the regulations were changed to their current form so that while a team could run a third driver during Friday practice, they were no longer allowed to provide them with a dedicated third car. Subsequently, most teams choose not to run a third driver in order to give their race drivers maximum practice time.

Third drivers are still used occasionally, most notably Sebastian Vettel, who drove for the BMW Sauber team on Fridays at the start of the 2007 season, while Scottish driver Paul di Resta ran in eight Friday practice sessions for Force India during the 2010 season. Also, on several occasions, third drivers have acted as reserves, racing if one of the team's two race drivers is injured or otherwise unable to race, as in di Resta's case during the 2017 Hungarian Grand Prix, where he replaced Felipe Massa, who became ill during free practice.

=== IROC ===
The International Race of Champions (IROC) employed former NASCAR drivers Dave Marcis, Dick Trickle and Jim Sauter as test drivers to prepare the setups for cars competing in the IROC series.

=== NASCAR ===
In NASCAR, test driving has mainly related to "research and development cars". A team might hire a driver and put them in the race to gather more data. NASCAR teams rarely have specific test drivers on staff.

== See also ==
- Product test
- Test pilot
