= 1997 German Formula Three Championship =

Auto race

Seasons
- ← 1996 1998 →

The 1997 German Formula Three Championship (German: 1997 Deutsche Formel-3-Meisterschaft) was the 23rd edition of the German Formula Three Championship. It commenced on 26 April 1997 and ended on 15 October. Opel Team BSR driver Nick Heidfeld won the championship title after a title battle with Benetton RTL Junior's Timo Scheider.

== Teams and drivers ==
1997 Entry List
Team	No.	Driver	Chassis	Engine	Status	Rounds
Class A
(Switzerland) Benetton RTL Junior Team	1	(Germany) Timo Scheider	Dallara 397/002	Opel	R	All
(Switzerland) Benetton RTL Junior Team	2	(Germany) Dominik Schwager	Dallara 397/045	Opel		1–5, 7–9
(Switzerland) Benetton RTL Junior Team	3	(Germany) Alexander Müller	Dallara 397/023	Opel	R	All
(Germany) Opel Team BSR	4	(Germany) Nick Heidfeld	Dallara 397/049	Opel		All
(Germany) Opel Team BSR	5	(Germany) Sascha Bert	Dallara 397/029	Opel		All
(Germany) Opel Team BSR	6	(Belgium) Tim Verbergt	Dallara 397/003	Opel		All
(Germany) Opel Team BSR	7	(Czech Republic) Tomáš Enge	Dallara 397/030	Opel	R	All
(Germany) Opel Team BSR	22	(Germany) Andreas Scheld	Dallara 397/003	Opel		8–9
(Germany) GM Jordan F3 Team	8	(Germany) Norman Simon	Dallara 397/052	Opel	R	All
(Germany) GM Jordan F3 Team	9	(Germany) Steffen Widmann	Dallara 397/054	Opel		1–3
(Germany) Josef Kaufmann Racing	9	(Germany) Steffen Widmann	Martini MK73/05	Opel		5–9
(Germany) Josef Kaufmann Racing	12	(Germany) Wolf Henzler	Martini MK73/02	Opel		All
(Germany) Josef Kaufmann Racing	14	(Poland) Jarosław Wierczuk	Martini MK73/01	Opel		1–7
(Germany) Josef Kaufmann Racing	36	(Germany) Tom Schwister	Martini MK73/01	Opel		9
(Germany) Trella Motorsport	10	(Germany) Pierre Kaffer	Dallara 396/012	Opel	R	All
(Sweden) IPS Motorsport	16	(Sweden) Johan Stureson	Dallara 397/046	Opel		All
(Belgium) JB Motorsport Boxy's Jeans	17	(Belgium) Yves Olivier	Dallara 397/007	Opel		All
(Greece) Tokmakidis Motorsport	18	(Netherlands) Tim Coronel	Dallara 397/018	Opel	R	1–6
(Netherlands) Van Amersfoort Racing	20	(Belgium) Bas Leinders	Dallara 397/009	Opel	R	All
(Germany) GM Motorsport	21	(Germany) Tim Bergmeister	Dallara 397/062	Opel		6–9
(Germany) GM Motorsport	25	(Germany) Ronny Melkus	Dallara 395/033	Opel		4
(Germany) GM Motorsport	25	(Germany) Ronny Melkus	Dallara 397/054	Opel		5
(Germany) GM Motorsport	25	(Germany) Ronny Melkus	Dallara 397/051	Opel		6–9
(Germany) KUG ELU Motorsport	22	(Germany) Andreas Scheld	Dallara 397/051	Opel		1–5
(Germany) MKL F3 Racing	27	(Germany) Lucas Luhr	Dallara 397/056	Opel		All
(Italy) Olympia Sport System	30	(Italy) Riccardo Moscatelli	Dallara 397/057	Opel		6–8
(Czech Republic) Leoš Prokopec	31	(Czech Republic) Leoš Prokopec	Dallara 397/047	Fiat		9
Class B
(Czech Republic) TKF Racing	50	(Argentina) Luciano Crespi	Dallara 396/022	Opel		1, 3–4
(Czech Republic) TKF Racing	56	(Poland) Marcin Biernacki	Dallara 396/022	Opel		5, 7–8
(Czech Republic) TKF Racing	59	(Poland) Jarosław Wierczuk	Dallara 396/022	Opel		9
(Czech Republic) Chemopetrol Mus Team F3 Racing	51	(Czech Republic) Jaroslav Kostelecký	Dallara 396/023	Opel	R	All
(Greece) Tokmakidis Motorsport	55	(Germany) Michael Stelzig	Dallara 395/071	Opel	R	All
(Greece) Tokmakidis Motorsport	58	(Greece) Nikolaos Stremmenos	Dallara 395/071	Opel		7–8
(Germany) GM Motorsport	52	(Germany) Michael Becker	Dallara 395/062	Opel	R	All
(Germany) GM Motorsport	53	(Russia) Roman Truschev	Dallara 395/033	Opel		1–2

Icon	Class
R	Rookie

== Race calendar and results ==
- The series supported the ADAC events at all nine rounds. With the exception of round at Salzuburg in Austria, all rounds took place on German soil.

Round		Circuit	Date	Pole position	Fastest lap	Winning driver	Winning team	B Class Winner
1	R1	Hockenheimring	26 April	(Germany) Alexander Müller	(Germany) Nick Heidfeld	(Germany) Nick Heidfeld	(Germany) Opel Team BSR	(Argentina) Luciano Crespi
1	R2	Hockenheimring	27 April	(Germany) Nick Heidfeld	(Germany) Nick Heidfeld	(Germany) Nick Heidfeld	(Germany) Opel Team BSR	(Germany) Michael Stelzig
2	R2	Nürburgring	24 May	(Germany) Alexander Müller	(Germany) Nick Heidfeld	(Germany) Timo Scheider	(Switzerland) Benetton RTL Junior Team	(Czech Republic) Jaroslav Kostelecký
2	R2	Nürburgring	24 May	(Germany) Timo Scheider	(Germany) Dominik Schwager	(Germany) Wolf Henzler	(Germany) Josef Kaufmann Racing	(Czech Republic) Jaroslav Kostelecký
3	R1	Sachsenring	14 June	(Belgium) Bas Leinders	(Germany) Nick Heidfeld	(Germany) Timo Scheider	(Switzerland) Benetton RTL Junior Team	(Czech Republic) Jaroslav Kostelecký
3	R2	Sachsenring	15 June	(Germany) Timo Scheider	(Germany) Timo Scheider	(Germany) Timo Scheider	(Switzerland) Benetton RTL Junior Team	(Argentina) Luciano Crespi
4	R1	Norisring	28 June	(Belgium) Bas Leinders	(Germany) Alexander Müller	(Germany) Dominik Schwager	(Switzerland) Benetton RTL Junior Team	(Argentina) Luciano Crespi
4	R2	Norisring	29 June	(Germany) Dominik Schwager	(Germany) Norman Simon	(Germany) Dominik Schwager	(Switzerland) Benetton RTL Junior Team	(Czech Republic) Jaroslav Kostelecký
5	R1	Wunstorf	12 July	(Germany) Wolf Henzler	(Belgium) Bas Leinders	(Germany) Alexander Müller	(Switzerland) Benetton RTL Junior Team	(Poland) Marcin Biernacki
5	R2	Wunstorf	13 July	(Germany) Alexander Müller	(Germany) Timo Scheider	(Germany) Alexander Müller	(Switzerland) Benetton RTL Junior Team	(Germany) Michael Becker
6	R1	Zweibrücken	9 August	(Germany) Wolf Henzler	(Germany) Pierre Kaffer	(Germany) Pierre Kaffer	(Germany) Trella Motorsport	(Germany) Michael Becker
6	R2	Zweibrücken	10 August	(Germany) Pierre Kaffer	(Germany) Nick Heidfeld	(Germany) Wolf Henzler	(Germany) Josef Kaufmann Racing	(Czech Republic) Jaroslav Kostelecký
7	R1	Salzburgring	23 August	(Germany) Nick Heidfeld	(Germany) Timo Scheider	(Germany) Nick Heidfeld	(Germany) Opel Team BSR	(Germany) Michael Becker
7	R2	Salzburgring	24 August	(Germany) Nick Heidfeld	(Germany) Nick Heidfeld	(Germany) Nick Heidfeld	(Germany) Opel Team BSR	(Czech Republic) Jaroslav Kostelecký
8	R1	Regio-Ring	5 September	(Czech Republic) Tomáš Enge	(Germany) Norman Simon	(Germany) Alexander Müller	(Switzerland) Benetton RTL Junior Team	(Czech Republic) Jaroslav Kostelecký
8	R2	Regio-Ring	6 September	(Germany) Alexander Müller	(Germany) Norman Simon	(Germany) Alexander Müller	(Switzerland) Benetton RTL Junior Team	(Germany) Michael Becker
9	R1	Nürburgring	4 October	(Germany) Nick Heidfeld	(Germany) Nick Heidfeld	(Germany) Nick Heidfeld	(Germany) Opel Team BSR	(Poland) Jarosław Wierczuk
9	R2	Nürburgring	5 October	(Germany) Nick Heidfeld	(Germany) Pierre Kaffer	(Germany) Norman Simon	(Germany) GM Jordan F3 Team	(Czech Republic) Jaroslav Kostelecký

== Championship standings ==
=== A-Class ===
- Points are awarded as follows:

1	2	3	4	5	6	7	8	9	10
20	15	12	10	8	6	4	3	2	1

=== B-Class ===
- Points are awarded as follows:

1	2	3	4	5	6
9	6	4	3	2	1

Pos	Driver	HOC		NÜR1		SAC		NOR		WUN		ZWE		SAL		LAH		NÜR2		Pts
Class A
1	(Germany) Nick Heidfeld	1	**1**	2	3	2	6	Ret	8	12	4	5	4	**1**	**1**	2	2	**1**	**2**	224
2	(Germany) Timo Scheider	3	9	1	**4**	1	**1**	5	4	3	3	2	2	2	2	16	5	3	3	218
3	(Germany) Alexander Müller	**Ret**	Ret	**3**	2	4	Ret	15	7	1	**1**	7	6	11	11	1	**1**	5	5	147
4	(Germany) Wolf Henzler	Ret	3	4	1	5	3	3	3	**Ret**	Ret	**3**	1	7	4	3	Ret	Ret	Ret	144
5	(Germany) Norman Simon	16†	Ret	9	5	15	15†	Ret	6	Ret	Ret	4	3	3	3	6	4	2	1	113
6	(Germany) Pierre Kaffer	5	Ret	8	8	9	5	6	10	4	Ret	1	**Ret**	5	6	7	7	4	4	103
7	(Belgium) Bas Leinders	4	2	6	6	**3**	2	**16**†	Ret	8	Ret	8	Ret	6	Ret	4	3	9	11	100
8	(Germany) Sascha Bert	9	8	5	Ret	14	Ret	2	2	9	8	Ret	9	4	5	12	8	8	6	80
9	(Belgium) Tim Verbergt	2	4	7	7	Ret	Ret	4	5	5	6	6	Ret	13	10					72
10	(Germany) Dominik Schwager	Ret	5	Ret	9	7	4	1	**1**	Ret	9			9	Ret	17†	Ret	Ret	14	68
11	(Germany) Ronny Melkus							8	Ret	2	2	14	7	DNS	DNS	9	6	13	8	48
12	(Czech Republic) Tomáš Enge	7	Ret	10	13	6	14†	14	Ret	10	7	9	Ret	Ret	7	**18**†	9	6	12	30
13	(Germany) Steffen Widmann	Ret	13	Ret	10	18†	9			7	5	11	5	12	9	10	Ret	Ret	15	26
14	(Sweden) Johan Stureson	10	Ret	Ret	DNS	8	12	7	9	6	11	15	Ret	8	8	13	Ret	7	Ret	26
15	(Belgium) Yves Olivier	11	7	17	18†	17†	8	Ret	15	14†	10	10	8	Ret	13	Ret	DNS	11	7	16
16	(Germany) Lucas Luhr											13	10	10	18	5	Ret	12	13	10
17	(Netherlands) Tim Coronel	8	6	13	12	11	Ret	10	Ret	Ret	Ret	16	12							10
18	(Argentina) Luciano Crespi	6	Ret			13	10	9	Ret											9
19	(Germany) Andreas Scheld	18	Ret	11	17	10	7	11	11	Ret	Ret					Ret	14	14	9	7
20	(Germany) Tim Bergmeister											12	11	15	12	8	10	10	10	6
21	(Germany) Michael Stelzig	13	10	15	Ret															1
22	(Czech Republic) Jaroslav Kostelecký	12	12	14	14	12	11	12	14	Ret	Ret	19†	13	18	14	11	12	17	16	0
23	(Germany) Michael Becker	17	11	16	16	16	Ret	Ret	13	Ret	12	18	14	14	Ret	Ret	11	16	18	0
24	(Poland) Jarosław Wierczuk	14	DNS	12	11	19†	13†	13	12	13†	Ret	17	15†	16	16			15	19†	0
25	(Poland) Marcin Biernacki									11	13			19	17	14	Ret			0
26	(Greece) Nikolaos Stremmenos													17	Ret	Ret	13			0
27	(Italy) Riccardo Moscatelli											Ret	Ret	Ret	15	15	15			0
28	(Russia) Roman Truschev	15	Ret	Ret	15															0
29	(Germany) Tom Schwister																	18	17	0
30	(Czech Republic) Leoš Prokopec																	19	Ret	0
Class B
1	(Czech Republic) Jaroslav Kostelecký	12	12	14	14	12	11	12	14	Ret	Ret	19†	13	18	14	11	12	17	16	111
2	(Germany) Michael Becker	17	11	16	16	16	Ret	Ret	13	Ret	12	18	14	14	Ret	Ret	11	16	18	83
3	(Argentina) Luciano Crespi	6	Ret			13	10	9	Ret											33
4	(Poland) Marcin Biernacki									11	13			19	17	14	Ret			30
5	(Germany) Michael Stelzig	13	10	15	Ret															19
6	(Poland) Jarosław Wierczuk	14	DNS	12	11	19†	13†	13	12	13†	Ret	17	15†	16	16			15	19†	13
7	(Greece) Nikolaos Stremmenos													17	Ret	Ret	13			10
8	(Russia) Roman Truschev	15	Ret	Ret	15															9
Pos	Driver	HOC		NÜR1		SAC		NOR		WUN		ZWE		SAL		LAH		NÜR2		Pts

=== Junior-Pokal (Rookie) standings ===
	Driver	Points
1	(Germany) Timo Scheider	163
2	(Germany) Alexander Müller	116
3	(Belgium) Bas Leinders	97
4	(Germany) Norman Simon	91
5	(Germany) Pierre Kaffer	90
6	(Czech Republic) Tomáš Enge	62
7	(Netherlands) Tim Coronel	21
8	(Czech Republic) Jaroslav Kostelecký	18
9	(Germany) Michael Becker	10
10	(Germany) Michael Stelzig	3

Colour	Result
Gold	Winner
Silver	Second place
Bronze	Third place
Green	Points classification
Blue	Non-points classification
Blue	Non-classified finish (NC)
Purple	Retired, not classified (Ret)
Red	Did not qualify (DNQ)
Red	Did not pre-qualify (DNPQ)
Black	Disqualified (DSQ)
White	Did not start (DNS)
White	Withdrew (WD)
White	Race cancelled (C)
Blank	Did not practice (DNP)
Blank	Did not arrive (DNA)
Blank	Excluded (EX)

**Bold** - Pole
Italics - Fastest Lap

† — Drivers did not finish the race, but were classified as they completed over 90% of the race distance.

== See also ==
- 1997 Masters of Formula 3
