= 1997 Masters of Formula 3 =

Auto race

Race details
Date	3 August 1997
Official name	Marlboro Masters of Formula 3
Location	Circuit Park Zandvoort, Netherlands
Course	2.519 km (1.565 mi)
Distance	Qualifying Race; 20 laps, 50.38 km (31.30 mi); Main Race; 32 laps, 80.608 km (50.087 mi)
- Qualifying Race

Pole
Driver	(Spain) Oriol Servià	La Filière
Time	1:02.785

Fastest Lap
Driver	(Spain) Oriol Servià	La Filière
Time	1:04.922 (on lap 7 of 20)

Podium
First	(Spain) Oriol Servià	La Filière
Second	(Germany) Sascha Bert	Opel Team BSR
Third	(Germany) Dominik Schwager	Benetton RTL Junior Team
- Main Race

Pole
Driver	(France) Sébastien Philippe	ASM Formule 3
Time	1:02.001

Fastest Lap
Driver	(France) Sébastien Philippe	ASM Formule 3
Time	1:03.188 (on lap 4 of 32)

Podium
First	(Netherlands) Tom Coronel	TOM'S
Second	(France) Sébastien Philippe	ASM Formule 3
Third	(Australia) Mark Webber	Alan Docking Racing

The 1997 Marlboro Masters of Formula 3 was the seventh Masters of Formula 3 race held at Circuit Park Zandvoort on 3 August 1997. It was won by Tom Coronel, for TOM'S after he started from fourth place.

== Drivers and teams ==
1997 Entry List
Team	No	Driver	Chassis	Engine	Main series
(United Kingdom) Alan Docking Racing	1	(Australia) Mark Webber	Dallara F397	Mugen-Honda	British Formula 3
(United Kingdom) Alan Docking Racing	49	(Japan) Haruki Kurosawa	Dallara F397	Mugen-Honda	British Formula 3
(United Kingdom) Alan Docking Racing	50	(Japan) Yudai Igarashi	Dallara F397	Mugen-Honda	British Formula 3
(Switzerland) Benetton RTL Junior Team	2	(Germany) Timo Scheider	Dallara F397	Opel	German Formula Three
(Switzerland) Benetton RTL Junior Team	3	(Germany) Dominik Schwager	Dallara F397	Opel	German Formula Three
(Switzerland) Benetton RTL Junior Team	4	(Germany) Alexander Müller	Dallara F397	Opel	German Formula Three
(France) Graff Racing	5	(France) Patrice Gay	Dallara F396	Opel	French Formula Three
(United Kingdom) Paul Stewart Racing	7	(United Kingdom) Jonny Kane	Dallara F397	Mugen-Honda	British Formula 3
(United Kingdom) Paul Stewart Racing	8	(United Kingdom) Peter Dumbreck	Dallara F397	Mugen-Honda	British Formula 3
(Germany) Opel Team BSR	9	(Germany) Nick Heidfeld	Dallara F397	Opel	German Formula Three
(Germany) Opel Team BSR	10	(Belgium) Tim Verbergt	Dallara F397	Opel	German Formula Three
(Germany) Opel Team BSR	11	(France) Stéphane Sarrazin	Dallara F397	Opel	French Formula Three
(Germany) Opel Team BSR	12	(Germany) Sascha Bert	Dallara F397	Opel	German Formula Three
(Italy) Team Ghinzani	14	(Italy) Niki Cadei	Dallara F397	Fiat	Italian Formula Three
(Italy) Team Ghinzani	15	(Italy) Paolo Ruberti	Dallara F397	Fiat	Italian Formula Three
(France) Promatecme Renault Elf	17	(Brazil) Enrique Bernoldi	Dallara F397	Renault	British Formula 3
(France) Promatecme Renault Elf	18	(France) Nicolas Minassian	Dallara F397	Renault	British Formula 3
(Italy) Prema Powerteam	19	(Portugal) André Couto	Dallara F397	Fiat	Italian Formula Three
(Italy) Prema Powerteam	20	(Italy) Alfredo Melandri	Dallara F397	Fiat	Italian Formula Three
(Italy) Prema Powerteam	21	(Netherlands) Donny Crevels	Dallara F397	Fiat	Italian Formula Three
(Germany) Josef Kaufmann Racing	22	(Germany) Wolf Henzler	Martini MK73	Opel	German Formula Three
(Germany) Josef Kaufmann Racing	23	(Poland) Jaroslaw Wierczuk	Martini MK73	Opel	German Formula Three
(Germany) Josef Kaufmann Racing	57	(Germany) Steffen Widmann	Martini MK73	Opel	German Formula Three
(France) ASM Formule 3	24	(Belgium) David Saelens	Dallara F396	Opel	French Formula Three
(France) ASM Formule 3	25	(France) Sébastien Philippe	Dallara F396	Opel	French Formula Three
(United Kingdom) Martin Donnelly Racing	27	(Brazil) Mario Haberfeld	Dallara F397	Opel	British Formula 3
(Netherlands) Van Amersfoort Racing	28	(Belgium) Bas Leinders	Dallara F397	Opel	German Formula Three
(Italy) EF Project	29	(Switzerland) Gabriele Gardel	Dallara F396	Fiat	Italian Formula Three
(Italy) EF Project	30	(Italy) Davide Uboldi	Dallara F396	Fiat	Italian Formula Three
(France) La Filière	31	(France) Franck Montagny	Martini MK73	Opel	French Formula Three
(France) La Filière	32	(Switzerland) Marcel Fässler	Dallara F396	Fiat	French Formula Three
(France) La Filière	33	(Spain) Oriol Servià	Martini MK73	Opel	French Formula Three
(United Kingdom) Fortec Motorsport	34	(United Kingdom) Ben Collins	Dallara F397	Mitsubishi	British Formula 3
(United Kingdom) Fortec Motorsport	35	(Argentina) Brian Smith	Dallara F397	Mitsubishi	British Formula 3
(United Kingdom) DC Cook Motorsport	36	(United Kingdom) Paula Cook	Dallara F397	Opel	British Formula 3
(United Kingdom) DC Cook Motorsport	37	(United Kingdom) Guy Smith	Dallara F397	Opel	British Formula 3
(Italy) Opel Team RC Motorsport	38	(Italy) Michele Gasparini	Dallara F397	Opel	Italian Formula Three
(Italy) Opel Team RC Motorsport	53	(Belgium) Jeffrey van Hooydonk	Dallara F397	Opel	Formula Renault Europe
(Greece) Tokmakidis Motorsport	40	(Greece) Nikolaos Stremmenos	Dallara F396	Opel	Italian Formula Three
(Greece) Tokmakidis Motorsport	41	(Netherlands) Tim Coronel	Dallara F397	Opel	German Formula Three
(Belgium) JB Motorsport	42	(Belgium) Yves Olivier	Dallara F397	Opel	German Formula Three
(Italy) Racing for Europe	43	(Italy) Davide Campana	Dallara F397	Opel	Italian Formula Three
(Italy) Olympia Sport System	44	(Italy) Riccardo Moscatelli	Dallara F397	Fiat	Italian Formula Three
(Germany) GM Motorsport	45	(Germany) Tim Bergmeister	Dallara F397	Opel	German Formula Three
(Germany) GM Motorsport	46	(Germany) Norman Simon	Dallara F397	Opel	German Formula Three
(United Kingdom) Tom's GB	47	(United Kingdom) Jamie Spence	Tom's 037	Toyota	British Formula 3
(United Kingdom) Tom's GB	48	(Brazil) Ricardo Maurício	Tom's 037	Toyota	British Formula 3
(Sweden) IPS Motorsport	51	(Sweden) Johan Stureson	Dallara F397	Opel	German Formula Three
(Italy) Cevenini Junior Team	54	(Indonesia) Ananda Mikola	Dallara F397	Fiat	Italian Formula Three
(United Kingdom) Carlin Motorsport	55	(United Kingdom) Henry Stanton	Dallara F397	Mugen-Honda	British Formula 3
(Japan) TOM'S	56	(Netherlands) Tom Coronel	Dallara F397	Toyota	All-Japan Formula Three

== Format changes ==
With an entry of 51 cars, race organisers changed the format of qualifying to allow every driver a shot at qualifying for the Marlboro Masters itself. The top 28 drivers from qualifying were automatically entered into the race, with the remaining drivers going into a qualifying race, as seen at the Macau Grand Prix. In the qualifying race, the top four finishers would progress to the Marlboro Masters.

== Classification ==
=== Qualifying ===
Pos	No	Name	Team	Time	Gap
1	25	(France) Sébastien Philippe	ASM Formule 3	1:02.001	
2	35	(Argentina) Brian Smith	Fortec Motorsport	1:02.046	+0.045
3	7	(United Kingdom) Jonny Kane	Paul Stewart Racing	1:02.066	+0.065
4	56	(Netherlands) Tom Coronel	TOM'S	1:02.086	+0.085
5	19	(Portugal) André Couto	Prema Powerteam	1:02.114	+0.113
6	21	(Netherlands) Donny Crevels	Prema Powerteam	1:02.166	+0.165
7	9	(Germany) Nick Heidfeld	Opel Team BSR	1:02.180	+0.179
8	1	(Australia) Mark Webber	Alan Docking Racing	1:02.183	+0.182
9	18	(France) Nicolas Minassian	Promatecme Renault Elf	1:02.214	+0.213
10	46	(Germany) Norman Simon	GM Motorsport	1:02.235	+0.234
11	28	(Belgium) Bas Leinders	Van Amersfoort Racing	1:02.261	+0.260
12	34	(United Kingdom) Ben Collins	Fortec Motorsport	1:02.264	+0.263
13	27	(Brazil) Mario Haberfeld	Martin Donnelly Racing	1:02.299	+0.298
14	15	(Italy) Paolo Ruberti	Team Ghinzani	1:02.351	+0.350
15	24	(Belgium) David Saelens	ASM Formule 3	1:02.362	+0.361
16	11	(France) Stéphane Sarrazin	Opel Team BSR	1:02.375	+0.374
17	8	(United Kingdom) Peter Dumbreck	Paul Stewart Racing	1:02.424	+0.423
18	5	(France) Patrice Gay	Graff Racing	1:02.444	+0.443
19	37	(United Kingdom) Guy Smith	DC Cook Motorsport	1:02.491	+0.490
20	22	(Germany) Wolf Henzler	Josef Kaufmann Racing	1:02.558	+0.557
21	4	(Germany) Alexander Müller	Benetton RTL Junior Team	1:02.564	+0.563
22	17	(Brazil) Enrique Bernoldi	Promatecme Renault Elf	1:02.576	+0.575
23	31	(France) Franck Montagny	La Filière	1:02.586	+0.585
24	32	(Switzerland) Marcel Fässler	La Filière	1:02.589	+0.588
25	57	(Germany) Steffen Widmann	Josef Kaufmann Racing	1:02.658	+0.657
26	53	(Belgium) Jeffrey van Hooydonk	Opel Team RC Motorsport	1:02.680	+0.679
27	20	(Italy) Alfredo Melandri	Prema Powerteam	1:02.684	+0.683
28	38	(Italy) Michele Gasparini	Opel Team RC Motorsport	1:02.710	+0.709
29	33	(Spain) Oriol Servià	La Filière	1:02.785	+0.784
30	3	(Germany) Dominik Schwager	Benetton RTL Junior Team	1:02.817	+0.816
31	12	(Germany) Sascha Bert	Opel Team BSR	1:02.861	+0.860
32	48	(Brazil) Ricardo Maurício	Tom's GB	1:02.883	+0.882
33	43	(Italy) Davide Campana	Racing for Europe	1:02.894	+0.893
34	10	(Belgium) Tim Verbergt	Opel Team BSR	1:02.895	+0.894
35	47	(United Kingdom) Jamie Spence	Tom's GB	1:02.905	+0.904
36	51	(Sweden) Johan Stureson	IPS Motorsport	1:02.914	+0.913
37	49	(Japan) Haruki Kurosawa	Alan Docking Racing	1:02.989	+0.988
38	41	(Netherlands) Tim Coronel	Tokmakidis Motorsport	1:03.121	+1.120
39	14	(Italy) Niki Cadei	Team Ghinzani	1:03.159	+1.158
40	2	(Germany) Timo Scheider	Benetton RTL Junior Team	1:03.160	+1.159
41	50	(Japan) Yudai Igarashi	Alan Docking Racing	1:03.188	+1.187
42	40	(Greece) Nikolaos Stremmenos	Tokmakidis Motorsport	1:03.230	+1.229
43	54	(Indonesia) Ananda Mikola	Cevenini Junior Team	1:03.249	+1.248
44	36	(United Kingdom) Paula Cook	DC Cook Motorsport	1:03.268	+1.267
45	45	(Germany) Tim Bergmeister	GM Motorsport	1:03.322	+1.321
46	55	(United Kingdom) Henry Stanton	Carlin Motorsport	1:03.339	+1.338
47	44	(Italy) Riccardo Moscatelli	Olympia Sport System	1:03.506	+1.505
48	29	(Switzerland) Gabriele Gardel	EF Project	1:03.549	+1.548
49	23	(Poland) Jaroslaw Wierczuk	Josef Kaufmann Racing	1:03.568	+1.567
50	42	(Belgium) Yves Olivier	JB Motorsport	1:03.692	+1.691
51	30	(Italy) Davide Uboldi	EF Project	1:03.957	+1.956

=== Qualification Race ===
- The top four drivers progressed to the main race. As Servià won the race, he would line up 29th on the grid, and so forth.

Pos	No	Driver	Team	Laps	Time/Retired	Grid
1	33	(Spain) Oriol Servià	La Filière	20	21:58.876	1
2	12	(Germany) Sascha Bert	Opel Team BSR	20	+1.579	3
3	3	(Germany) Dominik Schwager	Benetton RTL Junior Team	20	+3.366	2
4	14	(Italy) Niki Cadei	Team Ghinzani	20	+7.581	11
5	2	(Germany) Timo Scheider	Benetton RTL Junior Team	20	+14.982	12
6	54	(Indonesia) Ananda Mikola	Cevenini Junior Team	20	+17.901	15
7	44	(Italy) Riccardo Moscatelli	Olympia Sport System	20	+18.508	19
8	51	(Sweden) Johan Stureson	IPS Motorsport	20	+20.401	8
9	23	(Poland) Jaroslaw Wierczuk	Josef Kaufmann Racing	20	+30.035	21
10	29	(Switzerland) Gabriele Gardel	EF Project	20	+35.051	20
11	45	(Germany) Tim Bergmeister	GM Motorsport	20	+36.656	17
12	49	(Japan) Haruki Kurosawa	Alan Docking Racing	20	+42.676	9
13	40	(Greece) Nikolaos Stremmenos	Tokmakidis Motorsport	20	+48.109	14
14	30	(Italy) Davide Uboldi	EF Project	20	+48.693	23
Ret	41	(Netherlands) Tim Coronel	Tokmakidis Motorsport	13	Retired	10
Ret	50	(Japan) Yudai Igarashi	Alan Docking Racing	13	Retired	13
Ret	43	(Italy) Davide Campana	Racing for Europe	10	Retired	5
Ret	55	(United Kingdom) Henry Stanton	Carlin Motorsport	10	Retired	18
Ret	47	(United Kingdom) Jamie Spence	Tom's GB	5	Retired	7
Ret	10	(Belgium) Tim Verbergt	Opel Team BSR	4	Retired	6
Ret	48	(Brazil) Ricardo Maurício	Tom's GB	2	Retired	4
DNS	36	(United Kingdom) Paula Cook	DC Cook Motorsport			16
DNS	50	(Belgium) Yves Olivier	JB Motorsport			22
Fastest lap: Oriol Servià, 1:04.922, 139.681 km/h (86.794 mph) on lap 7

=== Race ===
Pos	No	Driver	Team	Laps	Time/Retired	Grid
1	56	(Netherlands) Tom Coronel	TOM'S	32	35:52.569	4
2	25	(France) Sébastien Philippe	ASM Formule 3	32	+1.111	1
3	1	(Australia) Mark Webber	Alan Docking Racing	32	+2.118	8
4	18	(France) Nicolas Minassian	Promatecme Renault Elf	32	+2.394	9
5	35	(Argentina) Brian Smith	Fortec Motorsport	32	+2.952	2
6	46	(Germany) Norman Simon	GM Motorsport	32	+3.981	10
7	9	(Germany) Nick Heidfeld	Opel Team BSR	32	+4.575	7
8	21	(Netherlands) Donny Crevels	Prema Powerteam	32	+4.692	6
9	24	(Belgium) David Saelens	ASM Formule 3	32	+5.709	15
10	5	(France) Patrice Gay	Graff Racing	32	+5.878	18
11	8	(United Kingdom) Peter Dumbreck	Paul Stewart Racing	32	+6.621	17
12	27	(Brazil) Mario Haberfeld	Martin Donnelly Racing	32	+6.859	13
13	32	(Switzerland) Marcel Fässler	La Filière	32	+9.805	24
14	31	(France) Franck Montagny	La Filière	32	+10.465	23
15	11	(France) Stéphane Sarrazin	Opel Team BSR	32	+11.057	16
16	53	(Belgium) Jeffrey van Hooydonk	Opel Team RC Motorsport	32	+11.669	26
17	33	(Spain) Oriol Servià	La Filière	32	+11.670	29
18	37	(United Kingdom) Guy Smith	DC Cook Motorsport	32	+12.275	19
19	38	(Italy) Michele Gasparini	Opel Team RC Motorsport	32	+12.545	28
20	34	(United Kingdom) Ben Collins	Fortec Motorsport	32	+13.170	12
21	4	(Germany) Alexander Müller	Benetton RTL Junior Team	32	+13.687	21
22	22	(Germany) Wolf Henzler	Josef Kaufmann Racing	32	+14.366	20
23	20	(Italy) Alfredo Melandri	Prema Powerteam	32	+14.367	27
24	12	(Germany) Sascha Bert	Opel Team BSR	32	+15.227	30
25	14	(Italy) Niki Cadei	Team Ghinzani	32	+15.966	32
26	57	(Germany) Steffen Widmann	Josef Kaufmann Racing	32	+16.172	25
Ret	19	(Portugal) André Couto	Prema Powerteam	26	Retired	5
Ret	7	(United Kingdom) Jonny Kane	Paul Stewart Racing	26	Retired	3
Ret	17	(Brazil) Enrique Bernoldi	Promatecme Renault Elf	26	Retired	22
Ret	28	(Belgium) Bas Leinders	Van Amersfoort Racing	20	Retired	11
Ret	15	(Italy) Paolo Ruberti	Team Ghinzani	13	Retired	14
Ret	3	(Germany) Dominik Schwager	Benetton RTL Junior Team	4	Retired	31
DNQ	2	(Germany) Timo Scheider	Benetton RTL Junior Team			
DNQ	54	(Indonesia) Ananda Mikola	Cevenini Junior Team			
DNQ	44	(Italy) Riccardo Moscatelli	Olympia Sport System			
DNQ	51	(Sweden) Johan Stureson	IPS Motorsport			
DNQ	23	(Poland) Jaroslaw Wierczuk	Josef Kaufmann Racing			
DNQ	29	(Switzerland) Gabriele Gardel	EF Project			
DNQ	45	(Germany) Tim Bergmeister	GM Motorsport			
DNQ	49	(Japan) Haruki Kurosawa	Alan Docking Racing			
DNQ	40	(Greece) Nikolaos Stremmenos	Tokmakidis Motorsport			
DNQ	30	(Italy) Davide Uboldi	EF Project			
DNQ	41	(Netherlands) Tim Coronel	Tokmakidis Motorsport			
DNQ	50	(Japan) Yudai Igarashi	Alan Docking Racing			
DNQ	43	(Italy) Davide Campana	Racing for Europe			
DNQ	55	(United Kingdom) Henry Stanton	Carlin Motorsport			
DNQ	47	(United Kingdom) Jamie Spence	Tom's GB			
DNQ	10	(Belgium) Tim Verbergt	Opel Team BSR			
DNQ	48	(Brazil) Ricardo Maurício	Tom's GB			
DNQ	36	(United Kingdom) Paula Cook	DC Cook Motorsport			
DNQ	50	(Belgium) Yves Olivier	JB Motorsport			
Fastest lap: Sébastien Philippe, 1:03.188, 143.515 km/h (89.176 mph) on lap 4
