= 1998 Masters of Formula 3 =

Race details
Date	9 August 1998
Official name	Marlboro Masters of Formula 3
Location	Circuit Park Zandvoort, Netherlands
Course	2.519 km (1.565 mi)
Distance	Qualifying Race A 20 laps, 50.38 km (31.30 mi); Qualifying Race B 20 laps, 50.38 km (31.30 mi); Main Race; 31 laps, 78.089 km (48.522 mi)
- Qualifying Race A

Pole
Driver	(Brazil) Enrique Bernoldi	Promatecme UK
Time	1:02.149

Fastest Lap
Driver	(Italy) Paolo Montin	Team Ghinzani
Time	1:03.074 (on lap 11 of 20)

Podium
First	(Brazil) Enrique Bernoldi	Promatecme UK
Second	(Italy) Paolo Montin	Team Ghinzani
Third	(Belgium) Jeffrey van Hooydonk	KMS Benetton Junior Team
- Qualifying Race B

Pole
Driver	(Denmark) Kristian Kolby	Fortec Motorsport
Time	1:01.899

Fastest Lap
Driver	(Brazil) Mario Haberfeld	Paul Stewart Racing
Time	1:02.813 (on lap 4 of 20)

Podium
First	(Belgium) David Saelens	ASM Fina
Second	(Denmark) Kristian Kolby	Fortec Motorsport
Third	(Brazil) Mario Haberfeld	Paul Stewart Racing
- Main Race

Pole
Driver	(Belgium) David Saelens	ASM Fina

Fastest Lap
Driver	(France) David Terrien	Graff Racing
Time	1:03.589 (on lap 11 of 31)

Podium
First	(Belgium) David Saelens	ASM Fina
First	(Brazil) Enrique Bernoldi	Promatecme UK
Third	(Brazil) Mario Haberfeld	Paul Stewart Racing

The 1998 Marlboro Masters of Formula 3 was the eighth Masters of Formula 3 race held at Circuit Park Zandvoort on 9 August 1998. It was won by David Saelens, for ASM Fina.

== Drivers and teams ==
1998 Entry List
Team	No	Driver	Chassis	Engine	Main series
(Netherlands) Van Amersfoort Racing	1	(Netherlands) Christijan Albers	Dallara F398	Opel	German Formula Three
(Netherlands) Van Amersfoort Racing	2	(Belgium) Bas Leinders	Dallara F398	Opel	German Formula Three
(France) ASM Fina	3	(France) Sébastien Dumez	Dallara F396	Renault	French Formula Three
(France) ASM Fina	4	(Belgium) David Saelens	Dallara F396	Renault	French Formula Three
(United Kingdom) Promatecme UK	5	(Brazil) Enrique Bernoldi	Dallara F398	Renault	British Formula 3
(United Kingdom) Promatecme UK	6	(United Kingdom) Marc Hynes	Dallara F398	Renault	British Formula 3
(Italy) EF Project	7	(Italy) Enrico Toccacelo	Dallara F395	Fiat	Italian Formula Three
(Italy) EF Project	8	(Italy) Michele Gasparini	Dallara F395	Fiat	Italian Formula Three
(Italy) EF Project	9	(Italy) Davide Uboldi	Dallara F395	Fiat	Italian Formula Three
(United Kingdom) Paul Stewart Racing	10	(Brazil) Mario Haberfeld	Dallara F398	Mugen-Honda	British Formula 3
(United Kingdom) Paul Stewart Racing	11	(Brazil) Luciano Burti	Dallara F398	Mugen-Honda	British Formula 3
(France) La Filière	14	(France) Sébastien Bourdais	Martini MK73	Opel	French Formula Three
(France) La Filière	15	(France) Franck Montagny	Martini MK73	Opel	French Formula Three
(France) La Filière	17	(Switzerland) Marcel Fässler	Martini MK73	Opel	French Formula Three
(Germany) Josef Kaufmann Racing	18	(Germany) Timo Scheider	Martini MK73	Opel	German Formula Three
(Italy) Prema Powerteam	19	(Italy) Gianluca Calcagni	Dallara F397	Opel	Italian Formula Three
(Italy) Prema Powerteam	20	(Netherlands) Donny Crevels	Dallara F397	Opel	Italian Formula Three
(Switzerland) KMS Benetton Junior Team	21	(Belgium) Jeffrey van Hooydonk	Dallara F398	Opel	German Formula Three
(Switzerland) KMS Benetton Junior Team	22	(Sweden) Johnny Mislijevic	Dallara F397	Opel	German Formula Three
(Switzerland) KMS Benetton Junior Team	23	(Germany) Thomas Mutsch	Dallara F397	Opel	German Formula Three
(France) Graff Racing	24	(France) David Terrien	Dallara F396	Opel	French Formula Three
(Italy) Venturini Racing	25	(Italy) Maurizio Mediani	Dallara F396	Alfa Romeo	Italian Formula Three
(Italy) Venturini Racing	26	(Sweden) Peter Sundberg	Dallara F396	Fiat	Italian Formula Three
(Italy) Team Ghinzani	27	(Italy) Paolo Montin	Dallara F398	Fiat	Italian Formula Three
(Italy) Team Ghinzani	28	(Switzerland) Gabriele Gardel	Dallara F398	Fiat	Italian Formula Three
(Italy) Team Ghinzani	29	(Italy) Riccardo Ronchi	Dallara F398	Fiat	Italian Formula Three
(Germany) GM-DSF-F3 Team	30	(Netherlands) Wouter van Eeuwijk	Dallara F397	Opel	German Formula Three
(Germany) GM-DSF-F3 Team	31	(Austria) Robert Lechner	Dallara F397	Opel	German Formula Three
(United Kingdom) Alan Docking Racing	32	(Brazil) Ricardo Maurício	Dallara F397	Mugen-Honda	British Formula 3
(United Kingdom) Alan Docking Racing	33	(Japan) Yudai Igarashi	Dallara F397	Mugen-Honda	British Formula 3
(Germany) Opel Team BSR	35	(Germany) Steffen Widmann	Dallara F397	Opel	German Formula Three
(Germany) Opel Team BSR	36	(Germany) Pierre Kaffer	Martini MK73	Opel	German Formula Three
(France) Signature	38	(Portugal) Tiago Monteiro	Dallara F396	Fiat	French Formula Three
(Italy) RC Motorsport	41	(Puerto Rico) Stanislas d'Oultremont	Dallara F397	Opel	Italian Formula Three
(Italy) RC Motorsport	42	(Indonesia) Ananda Mikola	Dallara F397	Opel	Italian Formula Three
(United Kingdom) Fortec Motorsport	43	(Australia) Andrej Pavicevic	Dallara F397	Mugen-Honda	British Formula 3
(United Kingdom) Fortec Motorsport	44	(Denmark) Kristian Kolby	Dallara F397	Mugen-Honda	British Formula 3
(United Kingdom) Fortec Motorsport	46	(Brazil) Hoover Orsi	Dallara F398	Mugen-Honda	Formula Renault Europe
(Sweden) IPS Motorsport	47	(Sweden) Johan Stureson	Dallara F397	Opel	German Formula Three
(United Kingdom) Intersport Racing	49	(United Kingdom) Ben Collins	Dallara F398	Opel	British Formula 3
(Germany) Klaus Trella Motorsport	50	(Germany) Thomas Jäger	Martini MK73	Opel	German Formula Three
(Germany) MKL F3 Racing	51	(Germany) Michael Becker	Dallara F398	Opel	German Formula Three
(Germany) MKL F3 Racing	52	(Germany) Lucas Luhr	Dallara F397	Opel	German Formula Three
Royal Automobile Club of Sweden	53	(Sweden) Michael Becker	Dallara F395	Fiat	German Formula Three
(United Kingdom) DC Cook Motorsport	54	(United Kingdom) Paula Cook	Dallara F398	Opel	German Formula Three
(Italy) Target Racing	55	(Greece) Nikolaos Stremmenos	Dallara F398	Opel	Italian Formula Three
(Italy) Target Racing	56	(Greece) Dimitris Deverikos	Dallara F396	Fiat	Greek Formula Three

== Format changes ==
With an entry of 47 cars, race organisers changed the format of qualifying to allow every driver a shot at qualifying for the Marlboro Masters itself. The field would be split into two groups; one for even-numbered cars and one for odd-numbered cars. Then there would be a qualifying session for each group, with that setting the grid for each group's qualification race. Each qualification race would see the top fourteen cars progressing through to the Marlboro Masters itself, with the pole position being awarded to the winner of the qualification race that was won in the quickest time. The remaining four cars would be made up from the highest qualifying drivers left.

== Classification ==
=== Qualifying ===
==== Group A ====
Pos	No	Name	Team	Time	Gap
1	5	(Brazil) Enrique Bernoldi	Promatecme UK	1:02.149	
2	21	(Belgium) Jeffrey van Hooydonk	KMS Benetton Junior Team	1:02.265	+0.116
3	27	(Italy) Paolo Montin	Team Ghinzani	1:02.369	+0.220
4	3	(France) Sébastien Dumez	ASM Fina	1:02.379	+0.230
5	47	(Sweden) Johan Stureson	IPS Motorsport	1:02.388	+0.239
6	1	(Netherlands) Christijan Albers	Van Amersfoort Racing	1:02.392	+0.243
7	11	(Brazil) Luciano Burti	Paul Stewart Racing	1:02.411	+0.262
8	31	(Austria) Robert Lechner	GM-DSF-F3 Team	1:02.412	+0.263
9	25	(Italy) Maurizio Mediani	Venturini Racing	1:02.420	+0.271
10	19	(Italy) Gianluca Calcagni	Prema Powerteam	1:02.445	+0.296
11	49	(United Kingdom) Ben Collins	Intersport Racing	1:02.522	+0.373
12	17	(Switzerland) Marcel Fässler	La Filière	1:02.661	+0.512
13	15	(France) Franck Montagny	La Filière	1:02.697	+0.548
14	33	(Japan) Yudai Igarashi	Alan Docking Racing	1:02.704	+0.555
15	29	(Italy) Riccardo Ronchi	Team Ghinzani	1:02.822	+0.673
16	23	(Germany) Thomas Mutsch	KMS Benetton Junior Team	1:02.837	+0.688
17	43	(Australia) Andrej Pavicevic	Fortec Motorsport	1:02.924	+0.775
18	51	(Germany) Michael Becker	MKL F3 Racing	1:02.932	+0.783
19	37	(Germany) Steffen Widmann	Opel Team BSR	1:03.031	+0.882
20	9	(Italy) Davide Uboldi	EF Project	1:03.140	+0.991
21	55	(Greece) Nikolaos Stremmenos	Target Racing	1:03.145	+0.996
22	7	(Italy) Enrico Toccacelo	EF Project	1:03.550	+1.401
23	41	(Puerto Rico) Stanislas d'Oultremont	RC Motorsport	1:03.724	+1.575
24	53	(Sweden) Michael Becker	Royal Automobile Club of Sweden	1:05.185	+3.036

==== Group B ====
Pos	No	Name	Team	Time	Gap
1	44	(Denmark) Kristian Kolby	Fortec Motorsport	1:01.899	
2	4	(Belgium) David Saelens	ASM Fina	1:01.908	+0.009
3	2	(Belgium) Bas Leinders	Van Amersfoort Racing	1:02.081	+0.182
4	24	(France) David Terrien	Graff Racing	1:02.083	+0.184
5	20	(Netherlands) Donny Crevels	Prema Powerteam	1:02.108	+0.209
6	10	(Brazil) Mario Haberfeld	Paul Stewart Racing	1:02.293	+0.394
7	6	(United Kingdom) Marc Hynes	Promatecme UK	1:02.311	+0.412
8	52	(Germany) Lucas Luhr	MKL F3 Racing	1:02.355	+0.456
9	32	(Brazil) Ricardo Maurício	Alan Docking Racing	1:02.420	+0.521
10	50	(Germany) Thomas Jäger	Klaus Trella Motorsport	1:02.476	+0.577
11	18	(Germany) Timo Scheider	Josef Kaufmann Racing	1:02.548	+0.649
12	42	(Indonesia) Ananda Mikola	RC Motorsport	1:02.569	+0.670
13	46	(Brazil) Hoover Orsi	Fortec Motorsport	1:02.581	+0.682
14	36	(Germany) Pierre Kaffer	Opel Team BSR	1:02.763	+0.864
15	14	(France) Sébastien Bourdais	La Filière	1:02.831	+0.932
16	26	(Sweden) Peter Sundberg	Venturini Racing	1:02.833	+0.934
17	28	(Switzerland) Gabriele Gardel	Team Ghinzani	1:02.998	+1.099
18	54	(United Kingdom) Paula Cook	DC Cook Motorsport	1:03.058	+1.159
19	38	(Portugal) Tiago Monteiro	Signature	1:03.063	+1.164
20	30	(Netherlands) Wouter van Eeuwijk	GM-DSF-F3 Team	1:03.187	+1.288
21	22	(Sweden) Johnny Mislijevic	KMS Benetton Junior Team	1:03.200	+1.301
22	8	(Italy) Michele Gasparini	EF Project	1:03.273	+1.374
23	56	(Greece) Dimitris Deverikos	Target Racing	1:04.211	+2.312

=== Qualification Race ===
==== Group A ====
Pos	No	Driver	Team	Laps	Time/Retired	Grid
1	5	(Brazil) Enrique Bernoldi	Promatecme UK	20	21:27.513	1
2	27	(Italy) Paolo Montin	Team Ghinzani	20	+1.374	3
3	21	(Belgium) Jeffrey van Hooydonk	KMS Benetton Junior Team	20	+11.366	2
4	3	(France) Sébastien Dumez	ASM Fina	20	+11.942	4
5	11	(Brazil) Luciano Burti	Paul Stewart Racing	20	+13.469	7
6	47	(Sweden) Johan Stureson	IPS Motorsport	20	+14.351	5
7	15	(France) Franck Montagny	La Filière	20	+14.877	13
8	25	(Italy) Maurizio Mediani	Venturini Racing	20	+15.671	9
9	49	(United Kingdom) Ben Collins	Intersport Racing	20	+16.402	11
10	33	(Japan) Yudai Igarashi	Alan Docking Racing	20	+23.866	14
11	37	(Germany) Steffen Widmann	Opel Team BSR	20	+26.255	19
12	7	(Italy) Enrico Toccacelo	EF Project	20	+32.318	22
13	23	(Germany) Thomas Mutsch	KMS Benetton Junior Team	20	+34.269	16
14	9	(Italy) Davide Uboldi	EF Project	20	+37.681	20
15	43	(Australia) Andrej Pavicevic	Fortec Motorsport	20	+39.615	17
16	1	(Netherlands) Christijan Albers	Van Amersfoort Racing	20	+43.254	6
17	51	(Germany) Michael Becker	MKL F3 Racing	20	+43.749	18
18	41	(Puerto Rico) Stanislas d'Oultremont	RC Motorsport	20	+46.715	23
19	31	(Austria) Robert Lechner	GM-DSF-F3 Team	20	+49.172	8
20	53	(Sweden) Michael Becker	Royal Automobile Club of Sweden	20	+57.644	24
21	29	(Italy) Riccardo Ronchi	Team Ghinzani	19	+1 Lap	15
22	55	(Greece) Nikolaos Stremmenos	Target Racing	15	Retired	21
Ret	17	(Switzerland) Marcel Fässler	La Filière	12	Retired	12
Ret	19	(Italy) Gianluca Calcagni	Prema Powerteam	1	Retired	10
Fastest lap: Paolo Montin, 1:03.074, 143.774 km/h (89.337 mph) on lap 11

==== Group B ====
Pos	No	Driver	Team	Laps	Time/Retired	Grid
1	4	(Belgium) David Saelens	ASM Fina	20	21:16.663	2
2	44	(Denmark) Kristian Kolby	Fortec Motorsport	20	+0.936	1
3	10	(Brazil) Mario Haberfeld	Paul Stewart Racing	20	+1.308	6
4	20	(Netherlands) Donny Crevels	Prema Powerteam	20	+1.887	5
5	18	(Germany) Timo Scheider	Josef Kaufmann Racing	20	+10.007	11
6	52	(Germany) Lucas Luhr	MKL F3 Racing	20	+11.715	8
7	46	(Brazil) Hoover Orsi	Fortec Motorsport	20	+15.600	13
8	50	(Germany) Thomas Jäger	Klaus Trella Motorsport	20	+16.789	10
9	36	(Germany) Pierre Kaffer	Opel Team BSR	20	+18.790	14
10	42	(Indonesia) Ananda Mikola	RC Motorsport	20	+24.446	12
11	6	(United Kingdom) Marc Hynes	Promatecme UK	20	+32.559	7
12	14	(France) Sébastien Bourdais	La Filière	20	+32.941	15
13	26	(Sweden) Peter Sundberg	Venturini Racing	20	+33.243	16
14	28	(Switzerland) Gabriele Gardel	Team Ghinzani	20	+33.921	17
15	54	(United Kingdom) Paula Cook	DC Cook Motorsport	20	+34.975	18
16	8	(Italy) Michele Gasparini	EF Project	20	+35.227	22
17	38	(Portugal) Tiago Monteiro	Signature	20	+39.295	19
18	22	(Sweden) Johnny Mislijevic	KMS Benetton Junior Team	20	+56.326	21
19	24	(France) David Terrien	Graff Racing	19	+1 Lap	4
20	30	(Netherlands) Wouter van Eeuwijk	GM-DSF-F3 Team	17	Retired	20
Ret	56	(Greece) Dimitris Deverikos	Target Racing	13	Retired	23
Ret	2	(Belgium) Bas Leinders	Van Amersfoort Racing	0	Retired	3
Ret	32	(Brazil) Ricardo Maurício	Alan Docking Racing	0	Retired	9
Fastest lap: Mario Haberfeld, 1:02.813, 144.371 km/h (89.708 mph) on lap 4

=== Race ===
Pos	No	Driver	Team	Laps	Time/Retired	Grid
1	4	(Belgium) David Saelens	ASM Fina	31	33:21.247	1
2	5	(Brazil) Enrique Bernoldi	Promatecme UK	31	+0.334	2
3	10	(Brazil) Mario Haberfeld	Paul Stewart Racing	31	+1.117	5
4	27	(Italy) Paolo Montin	Team Ghinzani	31	+2.489	4
5	3	(France) Sébastien Dumez	ASM Fina	31	+7.667	8
6	15	(France) Franck Montagny	La Filière	31	+10.192	14
7	21	(Belgium) Jeffrey van Hooydonk	KMS Benetton Junior Team	31	+18.368	6
8	18	(Germany) Timo Scheider	Josef Kaufmann Racing	31	+18.720	9
9	11	(Brazil) Luciano Burti	Paul Stewart Racing	31	+20.749	10
10	52	(Germany) Lucas Luhr	MKL F3 Racing	31	+21.179	11
11	47	(Sweden) Johan Stureson	IPS Motorsport	31	+21.633	12
12	25	(Italy) Maurizio Mediani	Venturini Racing	31	+22.072	16
13	49	(United Kingdom) Ben Collins	Intersport Racing	31	+24.768	18
14	50	(Germany) Thomas Jäger	Klaus Trella Motorsport	31	+25.539	15
15	6	(United Kingdom) Marc Hynes	Promatecme UK	31	+26.132	21
16	26	(Sweden) Peter Sundberg	Venturini Racing	31	+26.448	25
17	44	(Denmark) Kristian Kolby	Fortec Motorsport	31	+27.259	3
18	37	(Germany) Steffen Widmann	Opel Team BSR	31	+42.524	22
19	7	(Italy) Enrico Toccacelo	EF Project	31	+44.107	24
20	14	(France) Sébastien Bourdais	La Filière	31	+44.385	23
21	9	(Italy) Davide Uboldi	EF Project	31	+53.754	28
22	36	(Germany) Pierre Kaffer	Opel Team BSR	30	Retired	17
23	24	(France) David Terrien	Graff Racing	29	+ 2 Laps	31
24	28	(Switzerland) Gabriele Gardel	Team Ghinzani	24	Retired	27
Ret	20	(Netherlands) Donny Crevels	Prema Powerteam	22	Retired	7
Ret	42	(Indonesia) Ananda Mikola	RC Motorsport	12	Retired	19
Ret	31	(Austria) Robert Lechner	GM-DSF-F3 Team	11	Retired	32
Ret	33	(Japan) Yudai Igarashi	Alan Docking Racing	6	Retired	20
Ret	1	(Netherlands) Christijan Albers	Van Amersfoort Racing	5	Retired	30
Ret	23	(Germany) Thomas Mutsch	KMS Benetton Junior Team	3	Retired	26
Ret	2	(Belgium) Bas Leinders	Van Amersfoort Racing	1	Retired	29
Ret	46	(Brazil) Hoover Orsi	Fortec Motorsport	0	Retired	13
DNQ	43	(Australia) Andrej Pavicevic	Fortec Motorsport			
DNQ	51	(Germany) Michael Becker	MKL F3 Racing			
DNQ	41	(Puerto Rico) Stanislas d'Oultremont	RC Motorsport			
DNQ	53	(Sweden) Michael Becker	Royal Automobile Club of Sweden			
DNQ	29	(Italy) Riccardo Ronchi	Team Ghinzani			
DNQ	55	(Greece) Nikolaos Stremmenos	Target Racing			
DNQ	17	(Switzerland) Marcel Fässler	La Filière			
DNQ	19	(Italy) Gianluca Calcagni	Prema Powerteam			
DNQ	54	(United Kingdom) Paula Cook	DC Cook Motorsport			
DNQ	8	(Italy) Michele Gasparini	EF Project			
DNQ	38	(Portugal) Tiago Monteiro	Signature			
DNQ	22	(Sweden) Johnny Mislijevic	KMS Benetton Junior Team			
DNQ	30	(Netherlands) Wouter van Eeuwijk	GM-DSF-F3 Team			
DNQ	56	(Greece) Dimitris Deverikos	Target Racing			
DNQ	32	(Brazil) Ricardo Maurício	Alan Docking Racing			
Fastest lap: David Terrien, 1:03.589, 142.610 km/h (88.614 mph) on lap 11
