= Kostelecký =

Kostelecký (anglicized as Kostelecky) is a Czech-language surname. Notable people with the name include:

- Alan Kostelecky, American theoretical physicist and professor
- David Kostelecký (born 1975), Czech sports shooter
- Jaroslav Kostelecký (born 1979), Czech racing driver
