= 1995 Masters of Formula 3 =

Race details
Date	6 August 1995
Official name	Marlboro Masters of Formula 3
Location	Circuit Park Zandvoort, Netherlands
Course	2.519 km (1.565 mi)
Distance	32 laps, 80.608 km (50.087 mi)

Pole
Driver	(Argentina) Norberto Fontana	KMS
Time	1:02.747

Fastest Lap
Driver	(Germany) Ralf Schumacher	Opel Team WTS
Time	1:04.196 (on lap 6 of 32)

Podium
First	(Argentina) Norberto Fontana	KMS
Second	(Germany) Ralf Schumacher	Opel Team WTS
Third	(Brazil) Hélio Castroneves	Paul Stewart Racing

The 1995 Marlboro Masters of Formula 3 was the fifth Masters of Formula 3 race held at Circuit Park Zandvoort on 6 August 1995. It was won by Norberto Fontana, for KMS.

== Drivers and teams ==
All cars were equipped with a Dallara F395 chassis.

1995 Entry List
Team	No	Driver	Engine	Main series
(United Kingdom) Alan Docking Racing	1	(United Kingdom) Warren Hughes	Mitsubishi	British Formula 3
(United Kingdom) Alan Docking Racing	2	(Belgium) Kurt Mollekens	Mugen-Honda	British Formula 3
(Italy) Supercars	4	(Italy) Andrea Boldrini	Fiat	Italian Formula Three
(Italy) Supercars	5	(Italy) Danilo Rossi	Fiat	Italian Formula Three
(Switzerland) KMS	7	(Argentina) Norberto Fontana	Opel	German Formula Three
(United Kingdom) Paul Stewart Racing	8	(Brazil) Hélio Castroneves	Mugen-Honda	British Formula 3
(United Kingdom) Paul Stewart Racing	9	(United Kingdom) Ralph Firman	Mugen-Honda	British Formula 3
(Germany) Opel Team WTS	10	(Germany) Ralf Schumacher	Opel	German Formula Three
(Germany) Opel Team WTS	11	(Netherlands) Tom Coronel	Opel	German Formula Three
(United Kingdom) Edenbridge Racing	14	(United Kingdom) Oliver Gavin	Vauxhall	British Formula 3
(United Kingdom) Edenbridge Racing	15	(United Kingdom) Steven Arnold	Vauxhall	British Formula 3
(Italy) Prema Powerteam	17	(Italy) Gianantonio Pacchioni	Fiat	Italian Formula Three
(Italy) Prema Powerteam	18	(Greece) Nikolaos Nikolouzos	Fiat	Italian Formula Three
(Germany) Opel Team BSR	19	(Austria) Oliver Tichy	Opel	German Formula Three
(Germany) Opel Team BSR	20	(Italy) Massimiliano Angelelli	Opel	German Formula Three
(Italy) EF Project	21	(Italy) Luca Rangoni	Fiat	Italian Formula Three
(United Kingdom) Fortec Motorsport	22	(Brazil) Gualter Salles	Mugen-Honda	British Formula 3
(United Kingdom) Fortec Motorsport	23	(United Kingdom) Jamie Davies	Mugen-Honda	British Formula 3
(United Kingdom) Fortec Motorsport	24	(Netherlands) Hans de Graaff	Mugen-Honda	German Formula Three
(Austria) RSM Marko	25	(Germany) Arnd Meier	Fiat	German Formula Three
(United Kingdom) West Surrey Racing	27	(Brazil) Cristiano da Matta	Mugen-Honda	British Formula 3
(United Kingdom) West Surrey Racing	28	(United States) Brian Cunningham	Mugen-Honda	British Formula 3
(United Kingdom) West Surrey Racing	29	(Netherlands) Martijn Koene	Mugen-Honda	
(Germany) G+M Escom Motorsport	31	(Germany) Steffen Widmann	Opel	German Formula Three
(Germany) G+M Escom Motorsport	32	(Germany) Klaus Graf	Opel	German Formula Three
(Germany) G+M Escom Motorsport	33	(Austria) Alexander Wurz	Opel	German Formula Three
(United Kingdom) Super Nova Racing Team	34	(United Kingdom) James Matthews	Mugen-Honda	British Formula 3
(United Kingdom) Super Nova Racing Team	35	(Brazil) Luiz Garcia Jr.	Mugen-Honda	British Formula 3
(Italy) Team Ghinzani	36	(Italy) Maurizio Mediani	Fiat	Italian Formula Three
(Italy) Team Ghinzani	37	(Italy) Paolo Ruberti	Fiat	Italian Formula Three
(Germany) Abt Motorsport	38	(Germany) Christian Abt	Opel	German Formula Three
(Germany) Abt Motorsport	39	(Austria) Ralf Kalaschek	Opel	German Formula Three
(Italy) Coloni Motorsport	40	(Italy) Paolo Coloni	Fiat	German Formula Three
(Italy) Coloni Motorsport	41	(Italy) Alberto Pedemonte	Fiat	
(Italy) RC Motorsport	43	(Italy) Thomas Biagi	Opel	Italian Formula Three
(Italy) RC Motorsport	44	(Argentina) Esteban Tuero	Opel	Italian Formula Three
(Italy) BVM Racing	46	(Argentina) Gastón Mazzacane	Mugen-Honda	Italian Formula Three
(Greece) Nikolaos Stremmenos	47	(Greece) Nikolaos Stremmenos	Fiat	
(Italy) Pavesi Racing	50	(Italy) Oliver Martini	Fiat	Italian Formula Three

== Classification ==
=== Qualifying ===
Pos	No	Name	Team	Time	Gap
1	7	(Argentina) Norberto Fontana	KMS	1:02.747	
2	10	(Germany) Ralf Schumacher	Opel Team WTS	1:02.773	+0.026
3	17	(Italy) Gianantonio Pacchioni	Prema Powerteam	1:02.927	+0.180
4	14	(United Kingdom) Oliver Gavin	Edenbridge Racing	1:03.141	+0.394
5	23	(United Kingdom) Jamie Davies	Fortec Motorsport	1:03.238	+0.491
6	8	(Brazil) Hélio Castroneves	Paul Stewart Racing	1:03.300	+0.553
7	11	(Netherlands) Tom Coronel	Opel Team WTS	1:03.393	+0.646
8	21	(Italy) Luca Rangoni	EF Project	1:03.402	+0.655
9	27	(Brazil) Cristiano da Matta	West Surrey Racing	1:03.403	+0.656
10	20	(Italy) Massimiliano Angelelli	Opel Team BSR	1:03.413	+0.666
11	40	(Italy) Paolo Coloni	Coloni Motorsport	1:03.497	+0.750
12	28	(United States) Brian Cunningham	West Surrey Racing	1:03.526	+0.779
13	33	(Austria) Alexander Wurz	G+M Escom Motorsport	1:03.527	+0.780
14	25	(Germany) Arnd Meier	RSM Marko	1:03.556	+0.809
15	41	(Italy) Alberto Pedemonte	Coloni Motorsport	1:03.561	+0.814
16	1	(United Kingdom) Warren Hughes	Alan Docking Racing	1:03.566	+0.819
17	43	(Italy) Thomas Biagi	RC Motorsport	1:03.600	+0.853
18	2	(Belgium) Kurt Mollekens	Alan Docking Racing	1:03.606	+0.859
19	19	(Austria) Oliver Tichy	Opel Team BSR	1:03.729	+0.982
20	9	(United Kingdom) Ralph Firman	Paul Stewart Racing	1:03.758	+1.011
21	38	(Germany) Christian Abt	Abt Motorsport	1:03.776	+1.029
22	22	(Brazil) Gualter Salles	Fortec Motorsport	1:03.801	+1.054
23	37	(Italy) Paolo Ruberti	Team Ghinzani	1:03.836	+1.089
24	50	(Italy) Oliver Martini	Pavesi Racing	1:03.865	+1.118
25	35	(Brazil) Luiz Garcia Jr.	Super Nova Racing Team	1:03.894	+1.147
26	36	(Italy) Maurizio Mediani	Team Ghinzani	1:03.951	+1.204
27	4	(Italy) Andrea Boldrini	Supercars	1:04.045	+1.298
28	39	(Austria) Ralf Kalaschek	Abt Motorsport	1:04.050	+1.303
29	34	(United Kingdom) James Matthews	Super Nova Racing Team	1:04.157	+1.410
30	5	(Italy) Danilo Rossi	Supercars	1:04.245	+1.498
31	46	(Argentina) Gastón Mazzacane	BVM Racing	1:04.275	+1.528
32	29	(Netherlands) Martijn Koene	West Surrey Racing	1:04.312	+1.565
33	32	(Germany) Klaus Graf	G+M Escom Motorsport	1:04.315	+1.568
34	44	(Argentina) Esteban Tuero	RC Motorsport	1:04.324	+1.577
35	15	(United Kingdom) Steven Arnold	Edenbridge Racing	1:04.491	+1.744
36	24	(Netherlands) Hans de Graaff	Fortec Motorsport	1:04.732	+1.985
37	47	(Greece) Nikolaos Stremmenos	Nikolaos Stremmenos	1:04.834	+2.087
38	18	(Greece) Nikolaos Nikolouzos	Prema Powerteam	1:05.070	+2.323
39	31	(Germany) Steffen Widmann	G+M Escom Motorsport	1:05.554	+2.807

=== Race ===
Pos	No	Driver	Team	Laps	Time/Retired	Grid
1	7	(Argentina) Norberto Fontana	KMS	32	34:47.532	1
2	10	(Germany) Ralf Schumacher	Opel Team WTS	32	+0.631	2
3	8	(Brazil) Hélio Castroneves	Paul Stewart Racing	32	+2.278	6
4	14	(United Kingdom) Oliver Gavin	Edenbridge Racing	32	+4.342	4
5	11	(Netherlands) Tom Coronel	Opel Team WTS	32	+18.071	7
6	20	(Italy) Massimiliano Angelelli	Opel Team BSR	32	+18.980	10
7	21	(Italy) Luca Rangoni	EF Project	32	+19.929	8
8	2	(Belgium) Kurt Mollekens	Alan Docking Racing	32	+27.117	18
9	40	(Italy) Paolo Coloni	Coloni Motorsport	32	+28.766	11
10	9	(United Kingdom) Ralph Firman	Paul Stewart Racing	32	+29.198	20
11	41	(Italy) Alberto Pedemonte	Coloni Motorsport	32	+31.749	15
12	25	(Germany) Arnd Meier	RSM Marko	32	+31.967	14
13	43	(Italy) Thomas Biagi	RC Motorsport	32	+32.126	17
14	19	(Austria) Oliver Tichy	Opel Team BSR	32	+34.003	19
15	50	(Italy) Oliver Martini	Pavesi Racing	32	+37.627	24
16	34	(United Kingdom) James Matthews	Super Nova Racing Team	32	+37.761	29
17	38	(Germany) Christian Abt	Abt Motorsport	32	+40.795	21
18	46	(Argentina) Gastón Mazzacane	BVM Racing	32	+48.702	31
19	29	(Netherlands) Martijn Koene	West Surrey Racing	32	+49.439	32
20	35	(Brazil) Luiz Garcia Jr.	Super Nova Racing Team	32	+52.797	25
21	22	(Brazil) Gualter Salles	Fortec Motorsport	32	+57.731	22
22	37	(Italy) Paolo Ruberti	Team Ghinzani	31	+1 Lap	23
23	36	(Italy) Maurizio Mediani	Team Ghinzani	31	+1 Lap	26
24	39	(Austria) Ralf Kalaschek	Abt Motorsport	26	Retired	28
25	5	(Italy) Danilo Rossi	Supercars	25	Retired	30
26	17	(Italy) Gianantonio Pacchioni	Prema Powerteam	24	Retired	3
Ret	23	(United Kingdom) Jamie Davies	Fortec Motorsport	9	Retired	5
Ret	1	(United Kingdom) Warren Hughes	Alan Docking Racing	9	Retired	16
Ret	27	(Brazil) Cristiano da Matta	West Surrey Racing	6	Retired	9
Ret	33	(Austria) Alexander Wurz	G+M Escom Motorsport	2	Retired	13
Ret	4	(Italy) Andrea Boldrini	Supercars	2	Retired	27
Ret	28	(United States) Brian Cunningham	West Surrey Racing	0	Retired	12
DNQ	32	(Germany) Klaus Graf	G+M Escom Motorsport			
DNQ	44	(Argentina) Esteban Tuero	RC Motorsport			
DNQ	15	(United Kingdom) Steven Arnold	Edenbridge Racing			
DNQ	24	(Netherlands) Hans de Graaff	Fortec Motorsport			
DNQ	47	(Greece) Nikolaos Stremmenos	Nikolaos Stremmenos			
DNQ	18	(Greece) Nikolaos Nikolouzos	Prema Powerteam			
DNQ	31	(Germany) Steffen Widmann	G+M Escom Motorsport			
Fastest lap: Ralf Schumacher, 1:04.196, 141.261 km/h (87.776 mph) on lap 6
