= 1996 German Formula Three Championship =

Seasons
- ← 1995 1997 →

The 1996 German Formula Three Championship (German: 1996 Deutsche Formel-3-Meisterschaft) was the 22nd edition of the German Formula Three Championship. It commenced on 14 April 1996 and ended on 13 October. Italian driver Jarno Trulli won the title with six wins for the Swiss Opel Team KMS Benetton Formula.

== Teams and drivers ==
1996 Entry List
Team	No.	Driver	Chassis	Engine	Rounds
Class A
(Switzerland) Opel Team KMS Benetton Formula	1	(Italy) Jarno Trulli	Dallara 396	Opel	All
(Switzerland) Opel Team KMS Benetton Formula	2	(Germany) Tim Bergmeister	Dallara 396	Opel	1–5
(Switzerland) Opel Team KMS Benetton Formula	2	(Portugal) Rui Águas	Dallara 396	Opel	6–8
(Germany) Opel Team BSR	3	(Germany) Nick Heidfeld	Dallara 395	Opel	All
(Germany) Opel Team BSR	4	(Germany) Marcel Tiemann	Dallara 396	Opel	All
(Germany) Opel Team BSR	5	(Germany) Arnd Meier	Dallara 395	Opel	All
(Austria) Marko RSM	6	(Portugal) Rui Águas	Dallara 395	Alfa Romeo	1–2
(Austria) Marko RSM	7	(Austria) Oliver Tichy	Dallara 395	Alfa Romeo	1–2
(Germany) Opel Team GM Motorsport	8	(Portugal) Manuel Gião	Dallara 396	Opel	All
(Germany) Opel Team GM Motorsport	9	(Germany) Sascha Bert	Dallara 395	Opel	1–7
(Germany) Opel Team GM Motorsport	10	(Germany) Steffen Widmann	Dallara 395	Opel	All
(Germany) Josef Kaufmann Racing	11	(Germany) Wolf Henzler	Martini MK73	Opel	All
(Germany) Abt & Trella Motorsport	14	(Germany) Tobias Schlesinger	Dallara 395	Opel	7–8
(Germany) Abt & Trella Motorsport	15	(Germany) Christian Menzel	Dallara 395	Opel	All
(Germany) Abt & Trella Motorsport	16	(Germany) Dirk Müller	Dallara 395	Opel	2–5
(Germany) Hofmann Motorsport	14	(Italy) Gianantonio Pacchioni	Dallara 395	Opel	3–5
(Germany) Hofmann Motorsport	16	(Germany) Dirk Müller	Dallara 395	Opel	6
(Germany) Hofmann Motorsport	17	(France) Emmanuel Clérico	Dallara 395	Opel	2–6
(Greece) Tokmakidis Motorsport	18	(Brazil) Max Wilson	Dallara 395	Opel	1–2
(Greece) Tokmakidis Motorsport	18	(Portugal) Rui Águas	Dallara 395	Opel	3–5
(Greece) Tokmakidis Motorsport	18	(Germany) Tim Bergmeister	Dallara 395	Opel	6–7
(Greece) Tokmakidis Motorsport	18	(Poland) Jarosław Wierczuk	Dallara 395	Opel	8
(Greece) Tokmakidis Motorsport	19	(United Kingdom) John Barlow	Dallara 395	Opel	1
(Greece) Tokmakidis Motorsport	19	(Austria) Markus Friesacher	Dallara 395	Opel	2–5
(Greece) Tokmakidis Motorsport	19	(United Kingdom) Richard Westbrook	Dallara 395	Opel	6–8
(Italy) Parma Motorsport	21	(Austria) Markus Friesacher	Dallara 396	Alfa Romeo	1
(Italy) Parma Motorsport	22	(Belgium) Vincent Vosse	Dallara 396	Alfa Romeo	1–2
(Italy) Parma Motorsport	25	(Belgium) Tim Verbergt	Dallara 395	Fiat	6–8
(Italy) Prema Powerteam	23	(Macau) André Couto	Dallara 396	Fiat	All
(Italy) Prema Powerteam	24	(Brazil) Max Wilson	Dallara 395	Fiat	3–6
(Germany) MB Racing/Autoclub Excelsior	25	(Belgium) Tim Wergebt	Dallara 395	Fiat	1–5
(Netherlands) Westwood Racing	30	(Germany) Klaus Graf	Dallara 395	Toyota	1–4
Class B
(Czech Republic) TKF Racing	50	(Austria) Philipp Sager	Dallara 394	Opel	1–7
(Czech Republic) TKF Racing	51	(Germany) Dominik Schwager	Dallara 394	Opel	1-5
(Czech Republic) TKF Racing	51	(Argentina) Luciano Crespi	Dallara 394	Opel	6–8
(Sweden) IPS Motorsport	52	(Sweden) Johan Stureson	Dallara 394	Opel	All
(Austria) Franz Wöss Racing	53	(Poland) Jarosław Wierczuk	Dallara 393	Opel	1–7
(Austria) Franz Wöss Racing	53	(Austria) Georg Holzer	Dallara 396	Alfa Romeo	8
(Austria) Franz Wöss Racing	54	(Germany) Tobias Schlesinger	Dallara 393	Opel	1–5
(Austria) Franz Wöss Racing	54	(Austria) Christoph Fuchs	Dallara 396	Alfa Romeo	8
(Austria) Franz Wöss Racing	63	(Germany) Florian Schnitzenbaumer	Dallara 396	Alfa Romeo	8
(Germany) Divinol Oils	55	(Germany) Mario Münch	Dallara 394	Opel	All
(Belgium) JB Racing	56	(Belgium) Yves Olivier	Dallara 394	Opel	All
(Austria) Grand Prix Foundation	60	(Austria) Dietmar Frischmann	Dallara 393	Fiat	2–3
(Austria) Ingo Gerstl	65	(Austria) Ingo Gerstl	Dallara 393	Opel	6

== Race calendar and results ==
- The series supported the International Touring Car Championship at seven rounds, with additional round at the European Grand Prix. With the exception of round at Magny-Cours in France, all rounds took place on German soil.

Round		Circuit	Date	Pole position	Fastest lap	Winning driver	Winning team	B Class Winner
1	R1	Hockenheimring	13 April	(Italy) Jarno Trulli	not recorded	(Italy) Jarno Trulli	(Switzerland) Opel Team KMS Benetton Formula	(Germany) Dominik Schwager
1	R2	Hockenheimring	14 April	(Italy) Jarno Trulli	(Italy) Jarno Trulli	(Italy) Jarno Trulli	(Switzerland) Opel Team KMS Benetton Formula	(Germany) Dominik Schwager
2	R	Nürburgring	27 April	(Italy) Jarno Trulli	(Germany) Arnd Meier	(Germany) Arnd Meier	(Germany) Opel Team BSR	(Sweden) Johan Stureson
3	R1	Nürburgring	11 May	(Portugal) Rui Águas	(Germany) Nick Heidfeld	(Germany) Dirk Müller	(Germany) Abt & Trella Motorsport	(Belgium) Yves Olivier
3	R2	Nürburgring	12 May	(Germany) Dirk Müller	(Portugal) Rui Águas	(Germany) Marcel Tiemann	(Germany) Opel Team BSR	(Sweden) Johan Stureson
4	R1	Norisring	22 June	(Portugal) Rui Águas	(Germany) Marcel Tiemann	(Portugal) Rui Águas	(Greece) Tokmakidis Motorsport	(Germany) Dominik Schwager
4	R2	Norisring	23 June	(Portugal) Rui Águas	(Portugal) Rui Águas	(Italy) Jarno Trulli	(Switzerland) Opel Team KMS Benetton Formula	(Germany) Dominik Schwager
5	R1	Diepholz Airfield Circuit	6 July	(Italy) Jarno Trulli	(Germany) Wolf Henzler	(Brazil) Max Wilson	(Italy) Prema Powerteam	(Germany) Dominik Schwager
5	R2	Diepholz Airfield Circuit	7 July	(Brazil) Max Wilson	(France) Emmanuel Clérico	(Italy) Jarno Trulli	(Switzerland) Opel Team KMS Benetton Formula	(Germany) Dominik Schwager
6	R1	Nürburgring	31 August	(Germany) Nick Heidfeld	(Germany) Nick Heidfeld	(Germany) Nick Heidfeld	(Germany) Opel Team BSR	(Sweden) Johan Stureson
6	R2	Nürburgring	1 September	(Germany) Nick Heidfeld	(Germany) Nick Heidfeld	(Germany) Nick Heidfeld	(Germany) Opel Team BSR	(Sweden) Johan Stureson
7	R1	Circuit de Nevers Magny-Cours	14 September	(Italy) Jarno Trulli	(Germany) Nick Heidfeld	(Germany) Nick Heidfeld	(Germany) Opel Team BSR	(Sweden) Johan Stureson
7	R2	Circuit de Nevers Magny-Cours	15 September	(Germany) Nick Heidfeld	(Germany) Nick Heidfeld	(Germany) Arnd Meier	(Germany) Opel Team BSR	(Belgium) Yves Olivier
8	R1	Hockenheimring	12 October	(Italy) Jarno Trulli	(Portugal) Rui Águas	(Italy) Jarno Trulli	(Switzerland) Opel Team KMS Benetton Formula	(Sweden) Johan Stureson
8	R2	Hockenheimring	13 October	(Italy) Jarno Trulli	(Germany) Nick Heidfeld	(Italy) Jarno Trulli	(Switzerland) Opel Team KMS Benetton Formula	(Sweden) Johan Stureson

== Championship standings ==
=== A-Class ===
- Points are awarded as follows:

1	2	3	4	5	6	7	8	9	10
20	15	12	10	8	6	4	3	2	1

=== B-Class ===
- Points are awarded as follows:

1	2	3	4	5	6
9	6	4	3	2	1

Pos	Driver	HOC1		NÜR1	NÜR2		NOR		DIE		NÜR3		MAG		HOC2		Pts
Class A
1	(Italy) Jarno Trulli	**1**	**1**	**4**	6	5	3	1	**3**	1	2	2	**11**	5	**1**	**1**	206
2	(Germany) Arnd Meier	3	Ret	1	2	6	4	Ret	5	2	4	4	2	1	3	6	159
3	(Germany) Nick Heidfeld	6	Ret	2	4	4	Ret	3	Ret	11	**1**	**1**	1	**2**	17	4	138
4	(Germany) Marcel Tiemann	2	Ret	3	3	1	2	2	6	8	NC	Ret	12	7	4	8	115
5	(Portugal) Manuel Gião	5	Ret	7	5	11	7	5	7	5	3	3	5	3	11	7	92
6	(Portugal) Rui Águas	14	9	DNS	**Ret**	7	**1**	**4**	9	14	8	7	3	11	2	2	87
7	(Germany) Christian Menzel	7	4	6	7	2	5	20†	16	9	5	5	16	10	7	3	82
8	(Germany) Dominik Schwager	4	2	14	14	20†	8	6	8	4							47
9	(Germany) Steffen Widmann	Ret	10	5	10	12	11	7	DNS	12	7	6	4	4	18	Ret	44
10	(Brazil) Max Wilson	13	5	15	19	Ret	Ret	19†	1	**6**	17	Ret					34
11	(Germany) Wolf Henzler	10	3	9	11	Ret	12	8	13	10	12	12	6	Ret	5	Ret	33
12	(Germany) Dirk Müller			Ret	1	**3**	16	Ret	18	13	DNS	DNS					32
13	(Macau) André Couto	Ret	11	8	16	21†	10	12	4	3	15	14	10	17	12	Ret	27
14	(Belgium) Tim Verbergt	12	13	Ret	13	8	9	10	Ret	Ret	14	16	7	6	8	5	27
15	(France) Emmanuel Clérico			12	8	18†	15†	9	2	7	DNS	DNS					24
16	(Sweden) Johan Stureson	Ret	17	11	21	10	13	DNS	15	18	6	9	8	Ret	9	9	16
17	(Germany) Tim Bergmeister	11	6	Ret	15	Ret	DNQ	DNQ	DNS	DNS	9	8	14	13			11
18	(Germany) Sascha Bert	15	8	10	Ret	9	14	11	14	16	13	10	9	Ret			9
19	(Austria) Oliver Tichy	8	7	DNS													7
20	(Belgium) Yves Olivier	16	16	20	9	19†	Ret	18	17	19	10	Ret	13	8	13	10	7
21	(United Kingdom) Richard Westbrook										11	11	17	12	6	13†	6
22	(Italy) Gianantonio Pacchioni				12	Ret	6	Ret	Ret	Ret							6
23	(Argentina) Luciano Crespi										18	15	19	9	10	Ret	3
24	(Germany) Klaus Graf	9	14	13	18	DNS	Ret	14									2
25	(Austria) Markus Friesacher	Ret	18	18	20	16	17	16	10	15							1
26	(Germany) Mario Münch	18	12	16	17	14	18	13	11	Ret	16	13	19	Ret	DSQ	DSQ	0
27	(Germany) Florian Schnitzenbaumer														14	11	0
28	(Germany) Tobias Schlesinger	Ret	19	17	Ret	13	19†	15	12	17			15	14	Ret	Ret	0
29	(Austria) Georg Holzer														19†	12	0
30	(Austria) Philipp Sager	21†	15	22	23	15	Ret	17	Ret	20	19	17	20	15			0
31	(Poland) Jarosław Wierczuk	17	Ret	19	24†	22†	DNQ	DNQ	Ret	21	20	18	Ret	16	15	Ret	0
32	(Austria) Dietmar Frischmann			21	22	17											0
33	(Austria) Christoph Fuchs														17	Ret	0
34	(Belgium) Vincent Vosse	19	20	23													0
35	(Austria) Ingo Gerstl										21	19					0
36	(United Kingdom) John Barlow	20	21														0
Class B
1	(Sweden) Johan Stureson	Ret	17	11	21	10	13	DNS	15	18	6	9	8	Ret	9	9	81
2	(Germany) Dominik Schwager	4	2	14	14	20†	8	6	8	4							66
3	(Belgium) Yves Olivier	16	16	20	9	19†	Ret	18	17	19	10	Ret	13	8	13	10	58
4	(Germany) Mario Münch	18	12	16	17	14	18	13	11	Ret	16	13	19	Ret	DSQ	DSQ	50
5	(Germany) Tobias Schlesinger	Ret	19	17	Ret	13	19†	15	12	17			15	14	Ret	Ret	27
6	(Austria) Philipp Sager	21†	15	22	23	15	Ret	17	Ret	20	19	17	20	15			26
7	(Argentina) Luciano Crespi										18	15	19	9	10	Ret	26
8	(Poland) Jarosław Wierczuk	17	Ret	19	24†	22†	DNQ	DNQ	Ret	21	20	18	Ret	16	15	Ret	13
9	(Germany) Florian Schnitzenbaumer														14	11	7
10	(Austria) Georg Holzer														19†	12	4
11	(Austria) Dietmar Frischmann			21	22	17											4
12	(Austria) Christoph Fuchs														17	Ret	2
13	(Austria) Ingo Gerstl										21	19					1
Pos	Driver	HOC1		NÜR1	NÜR2		NOR		DIE		NÜR3		MAG		HOC2		Pts

Colour	Result
Gold	Winner
Silver	Second place
Bronze	Third place
Green	Points classification
Blue	Non-points classification
Blue	Non-classified finish (NC)
Purple	Retired, not classified (Ret)
Red	Did not qualify (DNQ)
Red	Did not pre-qualify (DNPQ)
Black	Disqualified (DSQ)
White	Did not start (DNS)
White	Withdrew (WD)
White	Race cancelled (C)
Blank	Did not practice (DNP)
Blank	Did not arrive (DNA)
Blank	Excluded (EX)

**Bold** - Pole
Italics - Fastest Lap

† — Drivers did not finish the race, but were classified as they completed over 90% of the race distance.

== See also ==
- 1996 Masters of Formula 3
