= 1998 German Formula Three Championship =

Seasons
- ← 1997 1999 →

The 1998 German Formula Three Championship (German: 1998 Deutsche Formel-3-Meisterschaft) was a multi-event motor racing championship for single-seat open wheel formula racing cars that held across Europe. The championship featured drivers competing in two-litre Formula Three racing cars built by Dallara and Martini which conform to the technical regulations, or formula, for the championship. It commenced on 18 April May at Hockenheimring and ended at Nürburgring on 4 October after ten double-header rounds.

Van Amersfoort Racing driver Bas Leinders became the first Belgian champion of the series. He clinched the title, winning seven of 20 races. Robert Lechner won the rookie championship and finished as runner-up with wins on home soil at Salzburgring, losing 21 points to Leinders. Wolf Henzler was victorious at Nürburgring. The other race winners was Pierre Kaffer, Christijan Albers, Timo Scheider, Thomas Jäger and Thomas Mutsch.

The scoring system consisted of 20-15-12-10-8-6-4-3-2-1 points, awarded to the top ten finishers in the race.

The first race of the event on October 4, 1997, at the Nürburgring was stopped after two laps due to heavy fog and did not count toward the championship.

== Teams and drivers ==
1998 Entry list
| Team | No. | Driver | Chassis | Engine | Status | Rounds |
|---|---|---|---|---|---|---|
| (Germany) Opel Team BSR | 0 | (Czech Republic) Tomáš Enge | Martini MK73/09 | Opel | | 1-2, 4-5 |
| (Germany) Opel Team BSR | 0 | (Germany) Tom Schwister | Martini MK73/09 | Opel | | 6 |
| (Germany) Opel Team BSR | 0 | (Germany) Timo Rumpfkeil | Dallara F397/029 | Opel | R | 9 |
| (Germany) Opel Team BSR | 0 | (South Africa) Toby Scheckter | Martini MK73/09 | Opel | | 10 |
| (Germany) Opel Team BSR | 1 | (Germany) Pierre Kaffer | Martini MK73/10 | Opel | | All |
| (Germany) Opel Team BSR | 2 | (Germany) Norman Simon | Dallara F397/049 | Opel | | All |
| (Germany) Opel Team BSR | 3 | (Germany) Steffen Widmann | Dallara F397/029 | Opel | | All |
| (Switzerland) KMS Benetton Junior Team | 5 | (Germany) Thomas Mutsch | Dallara F397/023 | Opel | R | All |
| (Switzerland) KMS Benetton Junior Team | 6 | (Sweden) Johnny Mislijevic | Dallara F397/002 | Opel | R | 1-9 |
| (Switzerland) KMS Benetton Junior Team | 6 | (Germany) Alex Müller | Dallara F397/002 | Opel | | 10 |
| (Switzerland) KMS Benetton Junior Team | 7 | (Belgium) Jeffrey van Hooydonk | Dallara F398/001 | Opel | R | All |
| (Germany) Josef Kaufmann Racing | 8 | (Germany) Wolf Henzler | Martini MK73/06 | Opel | | All |
| (Germany) Josef Kaufmann Racing | 9 | (Germany) Timo Scheider | Martini MK73/05 | Opel | | 3-9 |
| (Germany) GM-DSF-F3 Team | 10 | (Netherlands) Wouter van Eeuwijk | Dallara F397/054 | Opel | R | All |
| (Germany) GM-DSF-F3 Team | 11 | (Austria) Robert Lechner | Dallara F397/052 | Opel | R | All |
| (Germany) GM-DSF-F3 Team | 12 | (Germany) Tim Bergmeister | Dallara F397/062 | Opel | | 1, 4 |
| (Germany) Tim Bergmeister | 12 | (Germany) Tim Bergmeister | Dallara F397/062 | Opel | | 5-10 |
| (Germany) Klaus Trella Motorsport | 14 | (Germany) Thomas Jäger | Martini MK73/11 | Opel | R | All |
| (Germany) Klaus Trella Motorsport | 15 | (Germany) Thomas Braumüller | Dallara F396/012 | Opel | R | 1-4 |
| (Netherlands) Van Amersfoort Racing | 16 | (Belgium) Bas Leinders | Dallara F398/030 | Opel | | All |
| (Netherlands) Van Amersfoort Racing | 17 | (Netherlands) Christijan Albers | Dallara F398/004 | Opel | R | All |
| (Sweden) IPS Motorsport | 18 | (Sweden) Johan Stureson | Dallara F397/046 | Opel | | All |
| (Belgium) JB Motorsport | 19 | (Belgium) Yves Olivier | Dallara F398/021 | Opel | | All |
| (Belgium) JB Motorsport | 20 | (Poland) Marcin Biernacki | Dallara F398/031 | Opel | | All |
| (Germany) MKL F3 Racing | 21 | (Germany) Lucas Luhr | Dallara F397/056 | Opel | | All |
| (Czech Republic) TKF Racing | 22 | (Czech Republic) Petr Křižan | Dallara F396/022 | Opel | R | 7-9 |
| (Czech Republic) TKF Racing | 23 | (Poland) Jarosław Wierczuk | Dallara F398/009 | Opel | | All |
| (Czech Republic) TKF Racing | 24 | (Denmark) Lasse Jakobsen | Dallara F396/022 | Opel | R | 1-6 |
| (Germany) MKL F3 Racing | 27 | (Germany) Michael Becker | Dallara F398/023 | Opel | | 1-2, 4-9 |
| (Germany) MKL F3 Racing | 27 | (Germany) Tim Bergmeister | Dallara F397/062 | Opel | | 3 |
| Royal Automobile Club of Sweden | 28 | (Sweden) Nicklas Karlsson | Dallara F395/045 | Fiat | | 4 |
Austrian Formula 3 Cup
| (Czech Republic) Křižan Racing Team | 51 | (Czech Republic) Petr Křižan | Dallara F396/043 | Opel | R | 3 |
| (Austria) Franz Wöss Racing | 52 | (Czech Republic) Jaromír Zdražil | Dallara F396/042 | Opel | | 3 |
| (Austria) Franz Wöss Racing | 53 | (Germany) André Fibier | Dallara F395/015 | Opel | | 3 |
| (Austria) Achleitner Motorsport | 54 | (Austria) Josef Neuhauser | Dallara F394/021 | Opel | | 3 |
| (Germany) Jenichen Motorsport | 56 | (Germany) Dirk Jenichen | Dallara F396/023 | Opel | | 3 |
| (Germany) Fritz Kopp Racing Team | 57 | (Austria) Osmunde Dolischka | Dallara F395/070 | Opel | | 3 |
| (Czech Republic) Leoš Prokopec | 59 | (Czech Republic) Leoš Prokopec | Dallara F397/047 | Fiat | | 3 |
| (Austria) Steffek Racing Team | 61 | (Austria) Claudia Steffek | Dallara F391/002 | Alfa Romeo | | 3 |
| (Austria) Dietmar Frischmann | 62 | (Austria) Dietmar Frischmann | Dallara F396/004 | Opel | | 3 |

| Icon | Class |
|---|---|
| R | Rookie |

== Calendar ==
With the exception of round at Salzuburg in Austria, all rounds took place on German soil.

| Round | | Location | Circuit | Date | Supporting |
|---|---|---|---|---|---|
| 1 | R1 | Hockenheim, Germany | Hockenheimring | 18 April | ADAC-Preis Hockenheim |
| 1 | R2 | Hockenheim, Germany | Hockenheimring | 19 April | ADAC-Preis Hockenheim |
| 2 | R1 | Nürburg, Germany | Nürburgring | 9 May | 60. ADAC Eifelrennen |
| 2 | R2 | Nürburg, Germany | Nürburgring | 10 May | 60. ADAC Eifelrennen |
| 3 | R1 | Saxony, Germany | Sachsenring | 23 May | ADAC-Preis des mdr Sachsenring" |
| 3 | R2 | Saxony, Germany | Sachsenring | 24 May | ADAC-Preis des mdr Sachsenring" |
| 4 | R1 | Nuremberg, Germany | Norisring | 4 July | 56. ADAC Norisring Rennen "200 Meilen von Nürnberg" |
| 4 | R2 | Nuremberg, Germany | Norisring | 5 July | 56. ADAC Norisring Rennen "200 Meilen von Nürnberg" |
| 5 | R1 | Lahr, Germany | Regio-Ring | 18 July | ADAC-Preis Regio Ring Lahr |
| 5 | R2 | Lahr, Germany | Regio-Ring | 19 July | ADAC-Preis Regio Ring Lahr |
| 6 | R1 | Wunstorf, Germany | Wunstorf Air Base | 1 August | ADAC-Flugplatzrennen Wunstorf |
| 6 | R2 | Wunstorf, Germany | Wunstorf Air Base | 2 August | ADAC-Flugplatzrennen Wunstorf |
| 7 | R1 | Zweibrücken, Germany | Zweibrücken Air Base | 15 August | ADAC-Preis Flugplatz Zweibrücken |
| 7 | R2 | Zweibrücken, Germany | Zweibrücken Air Base | 16 August | ADAC-Preis Flugplatz Zweibrücken |
| 8 | R1 | Salzburg, Austria | Salzburgring | 29 August | ADAC-Alpentrophäe |
| 8 | R2 | Salzburg, Austria | Salzburgring | 30 August | ADAC-Alpentrophäe |
| 9 | R1 | Oschersleben, Germany | Motorsport Arena Oschersleben | 12 September | ADAC-Preis der Tourenwagen von "Sachsen-Anhalt" |
| 9 | R2 | Oschersleben, Germany | Motorsport Arena Oschersleben | 13 September | ADAC-Preis der Tourenwagen von "Sachsen-Anhalt" |
| 10 | R1 | Nürburg, Germany | Nürburgring | 3 October | 25. ADAC Bilstein Supersprint |
| 10 | R2 | Nürburg, Germany | Nürburgring | 4 October | 25. ADAC Bilstein Supersprint |

== Results ==
| Round | | Circuit | Pole position | Fastest lap | Winning driver | Winning team |
|---|---|---|---|---|---|---|
| 1 | R1 | Hockenheimring | (Austria) Robert Lechner | (Germany) Wolf Henzler | (Belgium) Bas Leinders | (Netherlands) Van Amersfoort Racing |
| 1 | R2 | Hockenheimring | (Belgium) Bas Leinders | (Belgium) Jeffrey van Hooydonk | (Belgium) Bas Leinders | (Netherlands) Van Amersfoort Racing |
| 2 | R1 | Nürburgring | (Belgium) Bas Leinders | (Germany) Wolf Henzler | (Germany) Wolf Henzler | (Germany) Josef Kaufmann Racing |
| 2 | R2 | Nürburgring | (Germany) Wolf Henzler | (Belgium) Bas Leinders | (Germany) Wolf Henzler | (Germany) Josef Kaufmann Racing |
| 3 | R1 | Sachsenring | (Belgium) Bas Leinders | (Belgium) Bas Leinders | (Belgium) Bas Leinders | (Netherlands) Van Amersfoort Racing |
| 3 | R2 | Sachsenring | (Belgium) Bas Leinders | (Netherlands) Christijan Albers | (Belgium) Bas Leinders | (Netherlands) Van Amersfoort Racing |
| 4 | R1 | Norisring | (Germany) Pierre Kaffer | (Belgium) Yves Olivier | (Netherlands) Christijan Albers | (Netherlands) Van Amersfoort Racing |
| 4 | R2 | Norisring | (Netherlands) Christijan Albers | (Austria) Robert Lechner | (Netherlands) Christijan Albers | (Netherlands) Van Amersfoort Racing |
| 5 | R1 | Regio-Ring | (Germany) Thomas Mutsch | (Germany) Timo Scheider | (Germany) Timo Scheider | (Germany) Josef Kaufmann Racing |
| 5 | R2 | Regio-Ring | (Germany) Timo Scheider | (Germany) Pierre Kaffer | (Germany) Timo Scheider | (Germany) Josef Kaufmann Racing |
| 6 | R1 | Wunstorf Air Base | (Germany) Thomas Jäger | (Germany) Steffen Widmann | (Germany) Thomas Jäger | (Germany) Opel Team BSR |
| 6 | R2 | Wunstorf Air Base | (Germany) Thomas Jäger | (Germany) Wolf Henzler | (Germany) Pierre Kaffer | (Germany) Opel Team BSR |
| 7 | R1 | Zweibrücken Air Base | (Belgium) Bas Leinders | (Belgium) Bas Leinders | (Belgium) Bas Leinders | (Netherlands) Van Amersfoort Racing |
| 7 | R2 | Zweibrücken Air Base | (Belgium) Bas Leinders | (Austria) Robert Lechner | (Germany) Pierre Kaffer | (Germany) Opel Team BSR |
| 8 | R1 | Salzburgring | (Austria) Robert Lechner | (Belgium) Bas Leinders | (Austria) Robert Lechner | (Germany) GM-DSF-F3 Team |
| 8 | R2 | Salzburgring | (Austria) Robert Lechner | (Germany) Pierre Kaffer | (Austria) Robert Lechner | (Germany) GM-DSF-F3 Team |
| 9 | R1 | Motorsport Arena Oschersleben | (Belgium) Bas Leinders | (Germany) Lucas Luhr | (Belgium) Bas Leinders | (Netherlands) Van Amersfoort Racing |
| 9 | R2 | Motorsport Arena Oschersleben | (Belgium) Bas Leinders | (Belgium) Jeffrey van Hooydonk | (Belgium) Bas Leinders | (Netherlands) Van Amersfoort Racing |
| 10 | R1 | Nürburgring | (Belgium) Bas Leinders | (Germany) Thomas Mutch | (Germany) Thomas Mutch | (Switzerland) KMS Benetton Junior Team |
| 10 | R2 | Nürburgring | (Germany) Thomas Mutsch | (Germany) Alex Müller | (Germany) Timo Scheider | (Germany) Josef Kaufmann Racing |

== Championship standings ==
=== Championship ===
| Pos | Driver | HOC | | NÜR1 | | SAC | | NOR | | LAH | | WUN | | ZWE | | SAL | | OSC | | NÜR2 | | Points |
|---|---|---|---|---|---|---|---|---|---|---|---|---|---|---|---|---|---|---|---|---|---|---|
| 1 | (Belgium) Bas Leinders | 1 | 1 | 16 | 7 | 1 | 1 | 2 | 6 | 7 | 7 | Ret | Ret | 1 | 2 | 14 | 3 | 1 | 1 | 2 | Ret | 200 |
| 2 | (Austria) Robert Lechner | 8 | 4 | 13 | 12 | 5 | Ret | 3 | 3 | 2 | 2 | 4 | 4 | 6 | 4 | 1 | 1 | 4 | 4 | Ret | 5 | 179 |
| 3 | (Germany) Wolf Henzler | 5 | 2 | 1 | 1 | 14 | 9 | Ret | Ret | 5 | 5 | 2 | 2 | 4 | 3 | 2 | 7 | 8 | 8 | 10 | 4 | 168 |
| 4 | (Germany) Pierre Kaffer | 2 | Ret | 20 | Ret | 11 | 20 | 4 | 2 | 8 | 17 | 7 | 1 | 2 | 1 | 3 | 2 | 17 | 10 | Ret | 9 | 132 |
| 5 | (Netherlands) Christijan Albers | 3 | Ret | 6 | 10 | 13 | 10 | 1 | 1 | 16 | 18 | 9 | 5 | 8 | 6 | 7 | 4 | 2 | 3 | 3 | 11 | 120 |
| 6 | (Belgium) Jeffrey van Hooydonk | 6 | 6 | 4 | 2 | 3 | 2 | Ret | 9 | 14 | 13 | 8 | 9 | 15 | 10 | 10 | 8 | 3 | 2 | 5 | 3 | 115 |
| 7 | (Germany) Timo Scheider | | | | | 9 | 3 | 6 | 14 | 1 | 1 | 6 | 6 | 3 | Ret | 4 | 11 | 15 | 13 | 7 | 1 | 114 |
| 8 | (Germany) Lucas Luhr | Ret | 9 | 8 | 5 | 8 | 6 | 9 | 7 | 3 | 3 | 5 | Ret | 9 | 7 | 11 | 6 | 5 | 6 | 8 | 7 | 90 |
| 9 | (Belgium) Yves Olivier | 4 | 5 | 2 | 3 | 20 | Ret | 15 | Ret | 12 | 8 | 13 | 7 | 5 | 5 | Ret | 16 | 9 | Ret | 6 | 6 | 76 |
| 10 | (Germany) Steffen Widmann | 11 | Ret | 21 | 13 | Ret | 19 | 8 | 5 | 6 | 9 | 3 | 3 | DNS | 9 | 5 | 20 | 11 | 19 | 4 | 2 | 68 |
| 11 | (Germany) Thomas Jäger | 7 | 3 | 3 | 6 | 12 | 8 | Ret | 12 | Ret | 11 | 1 | Ret | Ret | 13 | Ret | 17 | 10 | 12 | 11 | Ret | 58 |
| 12 | (Germany) Norman Simon | 15 | Ret | 7 | 10 | 2 | 7 | 7 | 10 | 9 | 6 | Ret | Ret | 11 | 19 | Ret | 5 | 12 | 9 | 16 | 16 | 56 |
| 13 | (Sweden) Johan Stureson | 12 | 8 | 11 | 11 | 6 | 4 | 11 | 8 | Ret | 15 | 17 | 8 | 7 | 8 | 6 | 15 | 6 | 5 | Ret | 15 | 52 |
| 14 | (Germany) Tim Bergmeister | Ret | 12 | | | 10 | Ret | 5 | 4 | 4 | 4 | 11 | Ret | 10 | 11 | 8 | 21 | Ret | DNS | 14 | Ret | 43 |
| 15 | (Germany) Thomas Mutsch | Ret | Ret | 5 | 8 | 4 | 21 | 10 | 15 | Ret | Ret | Ret | Ret | 12 | 12 | Ret | 12 | 7 | 7 | 1 | Ret | 30 |
| 16 | (Sweden) Johnny Mislijevic | Ret | 11 | 10 | 14 | 7 | 5 | 12 | Ret | 18 | Ret | 10 | Ret | 13 | 17 | Ret | 18 | 13 | Ret | | | 14 |
| 17 | (Netherlands) Wouter van Eeuwijk | Ret | Ret | 9 | 15 | 15 | Ret | 13 | 20 | 17 | Ret | Ret | Ret | Ret | 18 | 9 | 9 | Ret | 11 | 13 | 8 | 9 |
| 18 | (Denmark) Lasse Jakobsen | 10 | 7 | 14 | 16 | Ret | 14 | Ret | 13 | 19 | 16 | 14 | DSQ | | | | | | | | | 5 |
| 19 | (Poland) Jarosław Wierczuk | 9 | Ret | 15 | 19 | DSQ | 13 | 14 | 17 | 15 | 16 | 16 | 10 | 17 | 15 | 15 | 19 | 18 | 17 | 15 | 14 | 3 |
| 20 | (Czech Republic) Tomáš Enge | 14 | DNS | 12 | 9 | | | Ret | 11 | 10 | 12 | | | | | | | | | | | 3 |
| 21 | (Germany) Thomas Braumüller | 16 | 10 | 17 | 17 | 23 | Ret | Ret | 16 | | | | | | | | | | | | | 1 |
| 22 | (Germany) Michael Becker | Ret | DNS | 18 | DNS | | | Ret | Ret | 11 | 10 | 12 | Ret | 14 | Ret | 12 | 13 | Ret | 18 | | | 1 |
| 23 | (Czech Republic) Petr Křižan | | | | | 17 | 12 | | | | | | | 18 | 14 | 13 | 10 | 16 | 14 | | | 1 |
| 24 | (Germany) Alex Müller | | | | | | | | | | | | | | | | | | | 9 | 10 | 1 |
| 25 | (Germany) Tom Schwister | | | | | | | | | | | 15 | 11 | | | | | | | | | 0 |
| 26 | (Poland) Marcin Biernacki | 13 | Ret | 19 | 19 | 22 | Ret | 16 | 18 | 13 | 14 | DNS | DNS | 16 | 16 | Ret | 14 | 14 | 16 | 17 | 12 | 0 |
| 27 | (South Africa) Toby Scheckter | | | | | | | | | | | | | | | | | | | 12 | 13 | 0 |
| 28 | (Germany) André Fibier | | | | | 21 | 15 | | | | | | | | | | | | | | | 0 |
| 29 | (Germany) Timo Rumpfkeil | | | | | | | | | | | | | | | | | Ret | 15 | | | 0 |
| 30 | (Austria) Claudia Steffek | | | | | 18 | 16 | | | | | | | | | | | | | | | 0 |
| 31 | (Austria) Josef Neuhauser | | | | | 16 | Ret | | | | | | | | | | | | | | | 0 |
| 32 | (Germany) Dirk Jenichen | | | | | 24 | 17 | | | | | | | | | | | | | | | 0 |
| 33 | (Norway) Ole Martin Lindum | | | | | 19 | 18 | | | | | | | | | | | | | | | 0 |
| 34 | (Sweden) Nicklas Karlsson | | | | | | | Ret | 19 | | | | | | | | | | | | | 0 |
| | (Austria) Osmunde Dolischka | | | | | Ret | Ret | | | | | | | | | | | | | | | 0 |
| | (Austria) Dietmar Frischmann | | | | | Ret | Ret | | | | | | | | | | | | | | | 0 |
| | (Czech Republic) Jaromír Zdražil | | | | | Ret | Ret | | | | | | | | | | | | | | | 0 |
| | (Czech Republic) Leoš Prokopec | | | | | Ret | DSQ | | | | | | | | | | | | | | | 0 |
| | (Germany) Jörg Sandek | | | | | DNS | DNS | | | | | | | | | | | | | | | 0 |
| | (Germany) Frank Brendecke | | | | | DNQ | DNQ | | | | | | | | | | | | | | | 0 |
| Pos | Driver | HOC | | NÜR1 | | SAC | | NOR | | LAH | | WUN | | ZWE | | SAL | | OSC | | NÜR2 | | Points |

=== Junior-Pokal (Rookie) standings ===
| | Driver | Points |
|---|---|---|
| 1 | (Austria) Robert Lechner | 176 |
| 2 | (Belgium) Jeffrey van Hooydonk | 159 |
| 3 | (Netherlands) Christijan Albers | 150 |
| 4 | (Germany) Thomas Jäger | 93 |
| 5 | (Germany) Thomas Mutsch | 74 |
| 6 | (Sweden) Johnny Mislijevic | 33 |
| 7 | (Netherlands) Wouter van Eeuwijk | 29 |
| 8 | (Denmark) Lasse Jakobsen | 14 |
| 9 | (Czech Republic) Petr Křižan | 9 |
| 10 | (Germany) Thomas Braumüller | 3 |
| 11 | (Germany) Timo Rumpfkeil | 2 |
