= 1995 German Formula Three Championship =

Seasons
- ← 1994 1996 →

The 1995 German Formula Three Championship (German: 1995 Deutsche Formel-3-Meisterschaft) was a multi-event motor racing championship for single-seat open wheel formula racing cars that held in Germany and in France. The championship featured drivers competing in two-litre Formula Three racing cars built by Dallara which conform to the technical regulations, or formula, for the championship. It commenced on 22 April May at Hockenheimring and ended at the same place on 15 October after eight double-header rounds.

KMS driver Norberto Fontana became the first Argentine champion and the first champion from Americas. He dominated the season, winning ten of 16 races. Ralf Schumacher finished as runner-up with wins at Norisring and Diepholz Airfield Circuit, losing 85 points to Fontana. Massimiliano Angelelli also won at Norisring, completing the top-three in the drivers' championship. While Jarno Trulli, who spent his first two rounds in the B-Cup won both races in the season finale at Hockenheim. Jakob Sund won the title in B-Cup with just two-point advantage of Tim Bergmeister.

== Teams and drivers ==
All drivers competed in Dallara chassis, model listed.

Team	No.	Driver	Chassis	Engine	Rounds
Class A
(Austria) Marko RSM	1	(Portugal) Pedro Couceiro	F395/046	Fiat	All
(Austria) Marko RSM	2	(Germany) Arnd Meier	F395/026	Fiat	All
(Germany) G+M Escom Motorsport	3	(Austria) Alexander Wurz	F395/033	Opel	All
(Germany) G+M Escom Motorsport	4	(Germany) Klaus Graf	F395/034	Opel	All
(Germany) Opel Team WTS	5	(Germany) Ralf Schumacher	F395/005	Opel	All
(Germany) Opel Team WTS	6	(Netherlands) Tom Coronel	F395/036	Opel	All
(Switzerland) KMS	7	(Argentina) Norberto Fontana	F395/009	Opel	All
(Switzerland) KMS	8	(Italy) Jarno Trulli	F395/010	Opel	5-8
(Germany) Elf Zakspeed	9	(Germany) Marcel Tiemann	F395/008	Fiat	All
(Germany) Elf Zakspeed	10	(Belgium) Vincent Radermecker	F395/012	Fiat	1-3
(Germany) Elf Zakspeed	10	(Austria) Philipp Peter	F395/012	Fiat	5-8
(Germany) Abt Motorsport	11	(Italy) Paolo Coloni	F395/015	Opel	1-2
(Germany) Abt Motorsport	11	(Germany) Christian Abt	F395/015	Opel	3-8
(Germany) Abt Motorsport	12	(Austria) Ralf Kalaschek	F395/014	Opel	1-6
(Germany) Abt Motorsport	12	(Germany) Christian Menzel	F395/014	Opel	7-8
(Germany) Opel Team BSR	14	(Austria) Oliver Tichy	F395/001	Opel	1-6
(Germany) Opel Team BSR	14	(Brazil) Max Wilson	F395/001	Opel	7
(Germany) Opel Team BSR	14	(Denmark) Jason Watt	F395/001	Opel	8
(Germany) Opel Team BSR	15	(Italy) Massimiliano Angelelli	F395/013	Opel	All
(Germany) GM Logico	34	(Portugal) Rui Águas	F395/062	Opel	All
Class B
(Germany) Josef Kaufmann Racing	50	(Germany) Wolf Henzler	F394/006	Opel	All
(Austria) Marko RSM	51	(Austria) Marcus Friesacher	F394/012	Fiat	All
(Germany) Hofmann Motorsport	52	(Portugal) Gonçalo Gomes	F393/036	Opel	1-3
(Germany) Hofmann Motorsport	53	(Germany) Tim Bergmeister	F393/035	Opel	1-4
(Germany) hms Beru Zündkerzentechnik	52	(Germany) Dirk Müller	F393/036	Opel	4
(Germany) hms Beru Zündkerzentechnik	53	(Germany) Tim Bergmeister	F393/035	Opel	5-8
(Germany) Steinmetz G.u.T. Motorsport	54	(Germany) Timo Kluck	F394/019	Opel	1-5
(Germany) Steinmetz G.u.T. Motorsport	54	(Germany) Frank Krämer	F394/019	Opel	6-8
(Germany) Steinmetz G.u.T. Motorsport	55	(Germany) Steffen Widmann	F394/020	Opel	All
(Sweden) IPS Motorsport	57	(Sweden) Johan Stureson	F394/018	Opel	All
(Czech Republic) TKF Racing	58	(Denmark) Jakob Sund	F394/002	Opel	All
(Germany) Divinol Oils	59	(Germany) Mario Munch	F393/004	Opel	All
(Netherlands) Westwood Racing	60	(Germany) Wolfgang Koslowski	F393/065	Opel	2
(Netherlands) Westwood Racing	60	(Netherlands) Hans de Graaff	F393/065	Opel	3-4
(Netherlands) Westwood Racing	61	(Netherlands) Hans de Graaff	F393/003	Opel	1-2
(Netherlands) Sandro Zani	62	(Netherlands) Sandro Zani	F394/037	Fiat	All
(Switzerland) KMS	65	(Italy) Jarno Trulli	F394/016	Opel	3-4
(Switzerland) KMS	65	(Switzerland) Denis Schubiger	F394/016	Opel	5-8
(Austria) Achleitner Motorsport	67	(Austria) Martin Albrecht	F394/021	Opel	8
(Austria) Achleitner Motorsport	68	(Austria) Helmut Kopp	F394/005	Opel	8
(Austria) Achleitner Motorsport	69	(Austria) Christian Scheiring	F393/034	Opel	8
(Poland) Jarosław Wierczuk	70	(Poland) Jarosław Wierczuk	F393/001	Fiat	All

== Calendar ==
With the exception of round 7 at Magny-Cours in France, all rounds took place on German soil.

Round		Location	Circuit	Date	Supporting
1	R1	Hockenheim, Germany	Hockenheimring	22 April	AvD/MAC-Rennsportfestival
1	R2	Hockenheim, Germany	Hockenheimring	23 April	AvD/MAC-Rennsportfestival
2	R1	Berlin, Germany	AVUS	6 May	ADAC Avus Rennen
2	R2	Berlin, Germany	AVUS	7 May	ADAC Avus Rennen
3	R1	Nuremberg, Germany	Norisring	24 June	53. ADAC Norisringrennen "200 Meilen von Nürnberg"
3	R2	Nuremberg, Germany	Norisring	25 June	53. ADAC Norisringrennen "200 Meilen von Nürnberg"
4	R1	Diepholz, Germany	Diepholz Airfield Circuit	22 July	28. ADAC-Flugplatzrennen Diepholz
4	R2	Diepholz, Germany	Diepholz Airfield Circuit	23 July	28. ADAC-Flugplatzrennen Diepholz
5	R1	Nürburg, Germany	Nürburgring	19 August	ADAC Großer Preis der Tourenwagen
5	R2	Nürburg, Germany	Nürburgring	20 August	ADAC Großer Preis der Tourenwagen
6	R1	Singen, Germany	Alemannenring	16 September	5. ADAC-Preis Singen
6	R2	Singen, Germany	Alemannenring	17 September	5. ADAC-Preis Singen
7	R1	Magny-Cours, France	Circuit de Nevers Magny-Cours	7 October	ITC Nevers Magny-Cours
7	R2	Magny-Cours, France	Circuit de Nevers Magny-Cours	8 October	ITC Nevers Magny-Cours
8	R1	Hockenheim, Germany	Hockenheimring	14 October	ADAC-Preis Hockenheim
8	R2	Hockenheim, Germany	Hockenheimring	15 October	ADAC-Preis Hockenheim

== Results ==
Round		Circuit	Pole position	Fastest lap	Winning driver	Winning team	B Class Winner
1	R1	Hockenheimring	(Argentina) Norberto Fontana	(Germany) Ralf Schumacher	(Argentina) Norberto Fontana	(Switzerland) KMS	(Germany) Wolf Henzler
1	R2	Hockenheimring	(Argentina) Norberto Fontana	(Germany) Ralf Schumacher	(Argentina) Norberto Fontana	(Switzerland) KMS	(Germany) Wolf Henzler
2	R1	AVUS	(Argentina) Norberto Fontana	(Portugal) Rui Águas	(Argentina) Norberto Fontana	(Switzerland) KMS	(Germany) Tim Bergmeister
2	R2	AVUS	(Argentina) Norberto Fontana	(Argentina) Norberto Fontana	(Argentina) Norberto Fontana	(Switzerland) KMS	(Germany) Tim Bergmeister
3	R1	Norisring	(Italy) Massimiliano Angelelli	(Germany) Ralf Schumacher	(Germany) Ralf Schumacher	(Germany) Opel Team WTS	(Italy) Jarno Trulli
3	R2	Norisring	(Germany) Ralf Schumacher	(Germany) Ralf Schumacher	(Italy) Massimiliano Angelelli	(Germany) Opel Team BSR	No winner (Note: Jarno Trulli was disqualified from the second Norisring race. The officials chose not to recognise any driver as having finished in first place in the B-Cup.)
4	R1	Diepholz Airfield Circuit	(Italy) Massimiliano Angelelli	(Argentina) Norberto Fontana	(Germany) Ralf Schumacher	(Germany) Opel Team WTS	(Denmark) Jakob Sund
4	R2	Diepholz Airfield Circuit	(Germany) Ralf Schumacher	(Argentina) Norberto Fontana	(Germany) Ralf Schumacher	(Germany) Opel Team WTS	(Italy) Jarno Trulli
5	R1	Nürburgring	(Argentina) Norberto Fontana	(Argentina) Norberto Fontana	(Argentina) Norberto Fontana	(Switzerland) KMS	(Germany) Wolf Henzler
5	R2	Nürburgring	(Argentina) Norberto Fontana	(Germany) Ralf Schumacher	(Argentina) Norberto Fontana	(Switzerland) KMS	(Germany) Wolf Henzler
6	R1	Alemannenring	(Austria) Oliver Tichy	(Argentina) Norberto Fontana	(Argentina) Norberto Fontana	(Switzerland) KMS	(Germany) Frank Krämer
6	R2	Alemannenring	(Argentina) Norberto Fontana	(Italy) Massimiliano Angelelli	(Argentina) Norberto Fontana	(Switzerland) KMS	(Germany) Tim Bergmeister
7	R1	Circuit de Nevers Magny-Cours	(Argentina) Norberto Fontana	(Argentina) Norberto Fontana	(Argentina) Norberto Fontana	(Switzerland) KMS	(Germany) Frank Krämer
7	R2	Circuit de Nevers Magny-Cours	(Argentina) Norberto Fontana	(Italy) Jarno Trulli	(Argentina) Norberto Fontana	(Switzerland) KMS	(Denmark) Jakob Sund
8	R1	Hockenheimring	(Argentina) Norberto Fontana	(Argentina) Norberto Fontana	(Italy) Jarno Trulli	(Switzerland) KMS	(Germany) Wolf Henzler
8	R2	Hockenheimring	(Italy) Jarno Trulli	(Germany) Wolf Henzler	(Italy) Jarno Trulli	(Switzerland) KMS	(Germany) Tim Bergmeister

== Championship standings ==
=== A-Class ===
- Points are awarded as follows:

1	2	3	4	5	6	7	8	9	10
20	15	12	10	8	6	4	3	2	1

Pos	Driver	HOC1		AVU		NOR		DIE		NÜR		SIN		MAG		HOC2		Points
1	(Argentina) Norberto Fontana	**1**	**1**	**1**	**1**	3	4	3	3	**1**	**1**	1	**1**	**1**	**1**	**4**	20	256
2	(Germany) Ralf Schumacher	2	2	5	6	1	**2**	1	**1**	2	3	3	3	10	Ret	DSQ	DSQ	171
3	(Italy) Massimiliano Angelelli	DNS	DNS	2	2	**2**	1	**2**	2	DNS	6	Ret	9	4	3	2	Ret	140
4	(Italy) Jarno Trulli					8	DSQ	DSQ	6	4	2	8	4	5	17	1	**1**	95
5	(Portugal) Pedro Couceiro	3	4	6	9	15	7	7	7	8	7	2	2	11	6	DSQ	DSQ	85
6	(Austria) Alexander Wurz	4	3	Ret	5	22	8	Ret	DNS	7	8	Ret	7	2	2	Ret	19	74
7	(Netherlands) Tom Coronel	Ret	Ret	9	11	4	3	Ret	9	3	4	Ret	Ret	3	4	8	16	73
8	(Portugal) Rui Águas	7	6	4	13	7	Ret	13	Ret	Ret	18	4	Ret	6	Ret	6	2	61
9	(Germany) Arnd Meier	8	11	3	4	6	Ret	4	4	Ret	11	9	17	8	7	Ret	21	60
10	(Austria) Philipp Peter									5	5	7	6	20	10	5	3	47
11	(Austria) Oliver Tichy	Ret	14	7	3	5	Ret	5	5	DNS	DNS	**Ret**	16					40
12	(Germany) Klaus Graf	9	7	Ret	Ret	10	Ret	Ret	8	6	9	6	Ret	Ret	Ret	10	Ret	25
13	(Germany) Marcel Tiemann	11	9	8	7	12	5	9	17	Ret	15	Ret	11	Ret	14	7	10	24
14	(Germany) Wolf Henzler	10	8	12	Ret	Ret	Ret	14	12	10	12	DSQ	12	Ret	15	3	7	21
15	(Germany) Christian Abt					13	Ret	Ret	13	9	10	5	5	DSQ	Ret	21	12	19
16	(Germany) Tim Bergmeister	Ret	13	11	12	14	9	Ret	11	DNS	DNS	12	8	15	13	9	4	17
17	(Italy) Paolo Coloni	6	5	Ret	8													17
18	(Denmark) Jakob Sund	12	15	13	15	16	10	8	10	Ret	14	13	10	14	8	19	5	17
19	(Brazil) Max Wilson													7	5			12
20	(Belgium) Vincent Radermecker	5	12	DNS	14	9	Ret											10
21	(Austria) Ralf Kalaschek	Ret	Ret	10	10	11	Ret	6	Ret	Ret	21	Ret	Ret					8
22	(Denmark) Jason Watt															Ret	6	6
23	(Germany) Frank Krämer											10	DSQ	9	9	11	Ret	5
24	(Austria) Martin Albrecht															13	8	3
25	(Germany) Steffen Widmann	16	Ret	16	16	19	Ret	16	18	DNS	17	14	Ret	13	Ret	Ret	9	2
27	(Netherlands) Sandro Zani	15	10	Ret	20	20	13	15	15	15	16	Ret	14	16	12	18	Ret	1
28	(Sweden) Johan Stureson	18	Ret	14	19	DNQ	DNQ	10	Ret	14	20	15	13	12	15	12	Ret	1
29	(Germany) Timo Kluck	13	Ret	Ret	17	DNQ	DNQ	11	14	11	13							0
30	(Germany) Mario Münch	19	17	17	Ret	18	11	17	16	13	19	Ret	Ret	17	Ret	Ret	11	0
31	(Germany) Christian Menzel													18	11	15	Ret	0
32	(Austria) Marcus Friesacher	17	18	15	18	21	12	12	Ret	12	23	Ret	15	Ret	Ret	14	17	0
33	(Switzerland) Denis Schubiger									Ret	22	Ret	DNS	19	16	16	13	0
34	(Netherlands) Hans de Graaff	Ret	16	DNS	Ret	Ret	14	Ret	19									0
35	(Portugal) Gonçalo Gomes	14	Ret	Ret	Ret	17	Ret											0
36	(Poland) Jarosław Wierczuk															17	14	0
37	(Austria) Christian Scheiring															20	15	0
38	(Germany) Wolfgang Koslowski			18	21													0
39	(Austria) Helmut Kopp															Ret	18	0
	(Germany) Dirk Müller							Ret	DNS									0
Pos	Driver	HOC1		AVU		NOR		DIE		NÜR		SIN		MAG		HOC2		Points

Colour	Result
Gold	Winner
Silver	Second place
Bronze	Third place
Green	Points classification
Blue	Non-points classification
Blue	Non-classified finish (NC)
Purple	Retired, not classified (Ret)
Red	Did not qualify (DNQ)
Red	Did not pre-qualify (DNPQ)
Black	Disqualified (DSQ)
White	Did not start (DNS)
White	Withdrew (WD)
White	Race cancelled (C)
Blank	Did not practice (DNP)
Blank	Did not arrive (DNA)
Blank	Excluded (EX)

**Bold** - Pole
Italics - Fastest Lap

† — Drivers did not finish the race, but were classified as they completed over 90% of the race distance.
