= 1996 Masters of Formula 3 =

Race details
Date	4 August 1996
Official name	Marlboro Masters of Formula 3
Location	Circuit Park Zandvoort, Netherlands
Course	2.519 km (1.565 mi)
Distance	32 laps, 80.608 km (50.087 mi)

Pole
Driver	(Belgium) Kurt Mollekens	Alan Docking Racing
Time	1:02.332

Fastest Lap
Driver	(Belgium) Kurt Mollekens	Alan Docking Racing
Time	1:03.738 (on lap 7 of 32)

Podium
First	(Belgium) Kurt Mollekens	Alan Docking Racing
Second	(United Kingdom) Jonny Kane	Paul Stewart Racing
Third	(Germany) Nick Heidfeld	Opel Team BSR

The 1996 Marlboro Masters of Formula 3 was the sixth Masters of Formula 3 race held at Circuit Park Zandvoort on 4 August 1996. It was won by Kurt Mollekens, for Alan Docking Racing.

== Drivers and teams ==
1996 Entry List
Team	No	Driver	Chassis	Engine	Main series
(Switzerland) Opel Team KMS Benetton Formula	1	(Italy) Jarno Trulli	Dallara F396	Opel	German Formula Three
(Switzerland) Opel Team KMS Benetton Formula	2	(Germany) Dominik Schwager	Dallara F396	Opel	German Formula Three
(United Kingdom) Paul Stewart Racing	3	(United Kingdom) Jonny Kane	Dallara F395	Mugen-Honda	British Formula 3
(United Kingdom) Paul Stewart Racing	4	(United Kingdom) Ralph Firman	Dallara F395	Mugen-Honda	British Formula 3
(France) Graff Racing	7	(France) Grégoire de Galzain	Dallara F396	Opel	French Formula Three
(France) Graff Racing	8	(France) Soheil Ayari	Dallara F396	Opel	French Formula Three
(France) Graff Racing	10	(France) Boris Derichebourg	Dallara F396	Opel	French Formula Three
(Germany) Opel Team BSR	11	(Germany) Marcel Tiemann	Dallara F396	Opel	German Formula Three
(Germany) Opel Team BSR	12	(Germany) Arnd Meier	Dallara F395	Opel	German Formula Three
(Germany) Opel Team BSR	15	(Germany) Nick Heidfeld	Dallara F395	Opel	German Formula Three
(United Kingdom) Fortec Motorsport with HKS	16	(Colombia) Juan Pablo Montoya	Dallara F396	Mitsubishi	British Formula 3
(United Kingdom) Fortec Motorsport with HKS	17	(United Kingdom) Guy Smith	Dallara F396	Mitsubishi	British Formula 3
(Italy) EF Project	18	(Italy) Michele Gasparini	Dallara F395	Fiat	Italian Formula Three
(France) ASM Technik	19	(France) Sébastien Philippe	Dallara F396	Fiat	French Formula Three
(France) ASM Technik	20	(France) James Ruffier	Dallara F396	Fiat	French Formula Three
(Germany) Shannon Racing Team	21	(Germany) Christian Menzel	Dallara F395	Opel	German Formula Three
(Germany) Shannon Racing Team	22	(Germany) Dirk Müller	Dallara F396	Opel	German Formula Three
(Germany) Shannon Racing Team	43	(France) Emmanuel Clérico	Dallara F396	Opel	German Formula Three
(United Kingdom) Alan Docking Racing	23	(Belgium) Kurt Mollekens	Dallara F396	Mugen-Honda	British Formula 3
(United Kingdom) Alan Docking Racing	24	(United States) Brian Cunningham	Dallara F396	Mugen-Honda	British Formula 3
(Italy) Cevenini Junior Team	25	(Italy) Maurizio Mediani	Dallara F395	Fiat	Italian Formula Three
(Italy) Cevenini Junior Team	26	(Greece) Nikolaos Stremmenos	Dallara F395	Fiat	Italian Formula Three
(Italy) Shannon Racing Italia	29	(Italy) Gianluca Paglicci	Dallara F396	Opel	French Formula Three
(Germany) Shannon Opel Racing Team	31	(Germany) Steffen Widmann	Dallara F395	Opel	German Formula Three
(Germany) Shannon Opel Racing Team	32	(Portugal) Manuel Gião	Dallara F396	Opel	German Formula Three
(Japan) Tom's Racing	35	(Japan) Takashi Yokoyama	TOM'S 036	Toyota	British Formula 3
(Japan) Tom's Racing	36	(Argentina) Brian Smith	TOM'S 036	Toyota	British Formula 3
(Japan) Tom's Racing	38	(Japan) Kazuto Yanagawa	TOM'S 036	Toyota	British Formula 3
(Germany) Josef Kaufmann Racing	39	(Germany) Wolf Henzler	Dallara F395	Opel	German Formula Three
(Italy) Ravarotto Racing	40	(France) Anthony Beltoise	Dallara F396	Fiat	French Formula Three
(Italy) Tatuus	42	(Norway) Tommy Rustad	Dallara F396	Fiat	Italian Formula Three
(Netherlands) Van Amersfoort Racing	45	(Netherlands) Tim Coronel	Dallara F395	Fiat	Formula Opel Europe
(Italy) Prema Powerteam	46	(Portugal) André Couto	Dallara F396	Fiat	German Formula Three
(Italy) Prema Powerteam	47	(Netherlands) Donny Crevels	Dallara F395	Fiat	
(Italy) Racing for Europe	48	(Italy) Davide Campana	Dallara F396	Opel	Italian Formula Three
(Italy) Luciano Pavesi Team	49	(Italy) Oliver Martini	Dallara F395	Fiat	Italian Formula Three
(Italy) Ital Racing	50	(Greece) Nikolaos Nicolouzos	Dallara F396	Fiat	Italian Formula Three
(Belgium) Autoclub Excelsior	51	(Belgium) Tim Verbergt	Dallara F395	Fiat	German Formula Three
(United Kingdom) DC Cook Racing	53	(United Kingdom) Paula Cook	Dallara F395	Alfa Romeo	British Formula 3

== Classification ==
=== Qualifying ===
Pos	No	Name	Team	Time	Gap
1	23	(Belgium) Kurt Mollekens	Alan Docking Racing	1:02.332	
2	3	(United Kingdom) Jonny Kane	Paul Stewart Racing	1:02.480	+0.148
3	16	(Colombia) Juan Pablo Montoya	Fortec Motorsport with HKS	1:02.480	+0.148
4	15	(Germany) Nick Heidfeld	Opel Team BSR	1:02.511	+0.179
5	40	(France) Anthony Beltoise	Ravarotto Racing	1:02.562	+0.230
6	4	(United Kingdom) Ralph Firman	Paul Stewart Racing	1:02.571	+0.239
7	12	(Germany) Arnd Meier	Opel Team BSR	1:02.590	+0.258
8	24	(United States) Brian Cunningham	Alan Docking Racing	1:02.611	+0.279
9	36	(Argentina) Brian Smith	Tom's Racing	1:02.708	+0.376
10	1	(Italy) Jarno Trulli	Opel Team KMS Benetton Formula	1:02.712	+0.380
11	8	(France) Soheil Ayari	Graff Racing	1:02.840	+0.508
12	43	(France) Emmanuel Clérico	Shannon Racing Team	1:02.977	+0.645
13	32	(Portugal) Manuel Gião	Shannon Opel Racing Team	1:03.028	+0.696
14	42	(Norway) Tommy Rustad	Tatuus	1:03.031	+0.699
15	17	(United Kingdom) Guy Smith	Fortec Motorsport with HKS	1:03.067	+0.735
16	46	(Portugal) André Couto	Prema Powerteam	1:03.108	+0.776
17	25	(Italy) Maurizio Mediani	Cevenini Junior Team	1:03.114	+0.782
18	2	(Germany) Dominik Schwager	Opel Team KMS Benetton Formula	1:03.202	+ 0.870
19	51	(Belgium) Tim Verbergt	Autoclub Exelsior	1:03.206	+0.874
20	29	(Italy) Gianluca Paglicci	Shannon Racing Italia	1:03.274	+0.942
21	11	(Germany) Marcel Tiemann	Opel Team BSR	1:03.319	+0.987
22	48	(Italy) Davide Campana	Racing for Europe	1:03.378	+1.046
23	18	(Italy) Michele Gasparini	EF Project	1:03.400	+1.068
24	21	(Germany) Christian Menzel	Shannon Racing Team	1:03.490	+1.158
25	49	(Italy) Oliver Martini	Luciano Pavesi Team	1:03.496	+1.164
26	47	(Netherlands) Donny Crevels	Prema Powerteam	1:03.551	+1.219
27	22	(Germany) Dirk Müller	Shannon Racing Team	1:03.613	+1.281
28	20	(France) James Ruffier	ASM Technik	1:03.623	+1.291
29	35	(Japan) Takashi Yokoyama	Tom's Racing	1:03.663	+1.331
30	10	(France) Boris Derichebourg	Graff Racing	1:03.675	+1.343
31	38	(Japan) Kazuto Yanagawa	Tom's Racing	1:03.691	+1.359
32	19	(France) Sébastien Philippe	ASM Technik	1:03.726	+1.394
33	7	(France) Grégoire de Galzain	Graff Racing	1:03.782	+1.450
34	31	(Germany) Steffen Widmann	Shannon Opel Racing Team	1:03.785	+1.453
35	39	(Germany) Wolf Henzler	Josef Kaufmann Racing	1:03.798	+1.466
36	45	(Netherlands) Tim Coronel	Van Amersfoort Racing	1:03.839	+1.507
37	26	(Greece) Nikolaos Stremmenos	Cevenini Junior Team	1:03.925	+1.593
38	50	(Greece) Nikolaos Nikolouzos	Ital Racing	1:04.107	+1.775
39	53	(United Kingdom) Paula Cook	DC Cook Racing	1:04.703	+2.371

=== Race ===
Pos	No	Driver	Team	Laps	Time/Retired	Grid
1	23	(Belgium) Kurt Mollekens	Alan Docking Racing	32	36:18.819	1
2	3	(United Kingdom) Jonny Kane	Paul Stewart Racing	32	+4.332	2
3	15	(Germany) Nick Heidfeld	Opel Team BSR	32	+11.113	4
4	16	(Colombia) Juan Pablo Montoya	Fortec Motorsport with HKS	32	+19.168	3
5	29	(Italy) Gianluca Paglicci	Shannon Racing Italia	32	+34.113	20
6	42	(Norway) Tommy Rustad	Tatuus	32	+35.270	14
7	25	(Italy) Maurizio Mediani	Cevenini Junior Team	32	+35.442	17
8	43	(France) Emmanuel Clérico	Shannon Racing Team	32	+37.155	12
9	51	(Belgium) Tim Verbergt	Autoclub Exelsior	32	+37.992	19
10	48	(Italy) Davide Campana	Racing for Europe	32	+39.513	22
11	46	(Portugal) André Couto	Prema Powerteam	32	+40.756	16
12	10	(France) Boris Derichebourg	Graff Racing	32	+41.702	30
13	47	(Netherlands) Donny Crevels	Prema Powerteam	32	+43.061	26
14	20	(France) James Ruffier	ASM Technik	32	+46.987	28
15	2	(Germany) Dominik Schwager	Opel Team KMS Benetton Formula	32	+47.737	18
16	7	(France) Grégoire de Galzain	Graff Racing	32	+48.460	33^{1}
17	18	(Italy) Michele Gasparini	EF Project	32	+51.140	23
18	38	(Japan) Kazuto Yanagawa	Tom's Racing	32	+59.110	31
19	1	(Italy) Jarno Trulli	Opel Team KMS Benetton Formula	31	Retired	10
20	8	(France) Soheil Ayari	Graff Racing	31	+1 Lap	11
21	35	(Japan) Takashi Yokoyama	Tom's Racing	30	+2 Laps	29
22	36	(Argentina) Brian Smith	Tom's Racing	30	+2 Laps	9
Ret	11	(Germany) Marcel Tiemann	Opel Team BSR	18	Retired	21
Ret	32	(Portugal) Manuel Gião	Shannon Opel Racing Team	17	Retired	13
Ret	21	(Germany) Christian Menzel	Shannon Racing Team	14	Retired	24
Ret	4	(United Kingdom) Ralph Firman	Paul Stewart Racing	6	Retired	6
Ret	19	(France) Sébastien Philippe	ASM Technik	6	Retired	32
Ret	40	(France) Anthony Beltoise	Ravarotto Racing	5	Retired	5
Ret	12	(Germany) Arnd Meier	Opel Team BSR	1	Retired	7
Ret	49	(Italy) Oliver Martini	Luciano Pavesi Team	0	Retired	25
Ret	17	(United Kingdom) Guy Smith	Fortec Motorsport with HKS	0	Retired	15
Ret	24	(United States) Brian Cunningham	West Surrey Racing	0	Retired	8
DNS	22	(Germany) Dirk Müller	Shannon Racing Team		Withdrew	27^{1}
DNQ	31	(Germany) Steffen Widmann	Shannon Opel Racing Team			
DNQ	39	(Germany) Wolf Henzler	Josef Kaufmann Racing			
DNQ	45	(Netherlands) Tim Coronel	Van Amersfoort Racing			
DNQ	26	(Greece) Nikolaos Stremmenos	Cevenini Junior Team			
DNQ	50	(Greece) Nikolaos Nikolouzos	Ital Racing			
DNQ	53	(United Kingdom) Paula Cook	DC Cook Racing			
Fastest lap: Kurt Mollekens, 1:03.738, 142.276 km/h (88.406 mph) on lap 7

1. - Müller withdrew from the race after qualifying, and thus, de Galzain was allowed to race.
