= Jaroslav Kostelecký =

Czech racing driver

Jaroslav Kostelecky
- Nationality: (Czech Republic) Czech
- Born: April 26, 1979 (age 47) Czech Republic

Championship titles
- 1997 2002: German Formula 3 (Challenge); Austria Formula 3 Cup

Jaroslav Kostelecky (born April 26, 1979) is a Czech racing driver. He has competed in such series as the German Formula Three Championship. He won the 2002 season of Austria Formula 3 Cup.
