= Jeffrey van Hooydonk =

Belgian racing car driver (born 1977)

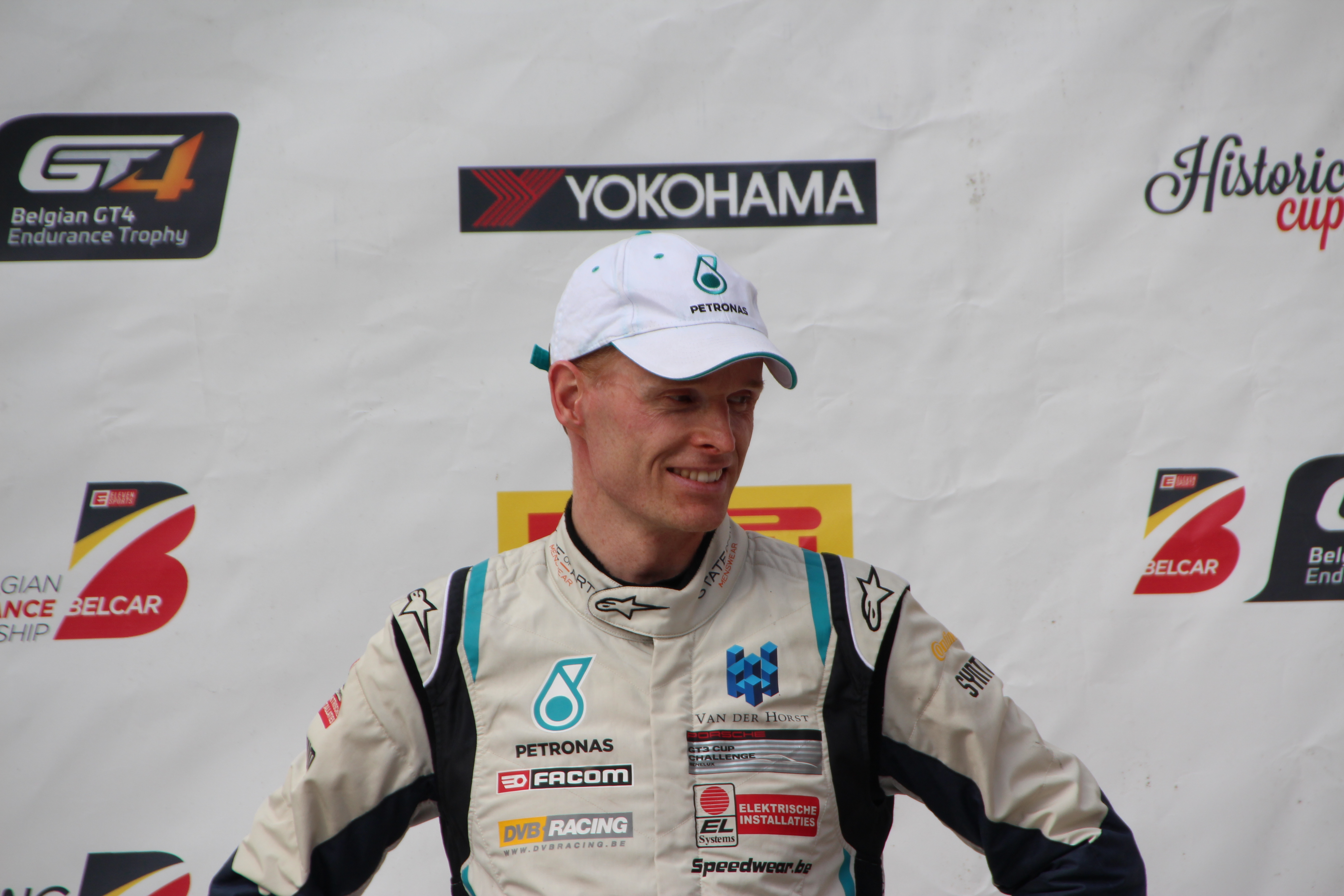
- Van Hooydonk in 2018
- Nationality: (Belgium) Belgian
- Born: Jeffrey Lesley Luc van Hooydonk; 1 October 1977 (age 49) Wommelgem, Belgium
- Categorisation: FIA Gold

Jeffrey Lesley Luc van Hooydonk (born 1 October 1977) is a Belgian racing car driver.

A native of Antwerp, Van Hooydonk began racing karts in 1990 and graduated to open-wheel racing five years later. For the next three seasons, he was successful in Formula Renault, winning the European Formula Super Renault championship in 1997. He progressed to German Formula Three the following year, finishing sixth in the championship, and then moving up to Formula 3000 in 1999. Despite scoring one pole position, the next two years were largely unsuccessful, and van Hooydonk switched to the Belcar series in 2001 with a Porsche 996.

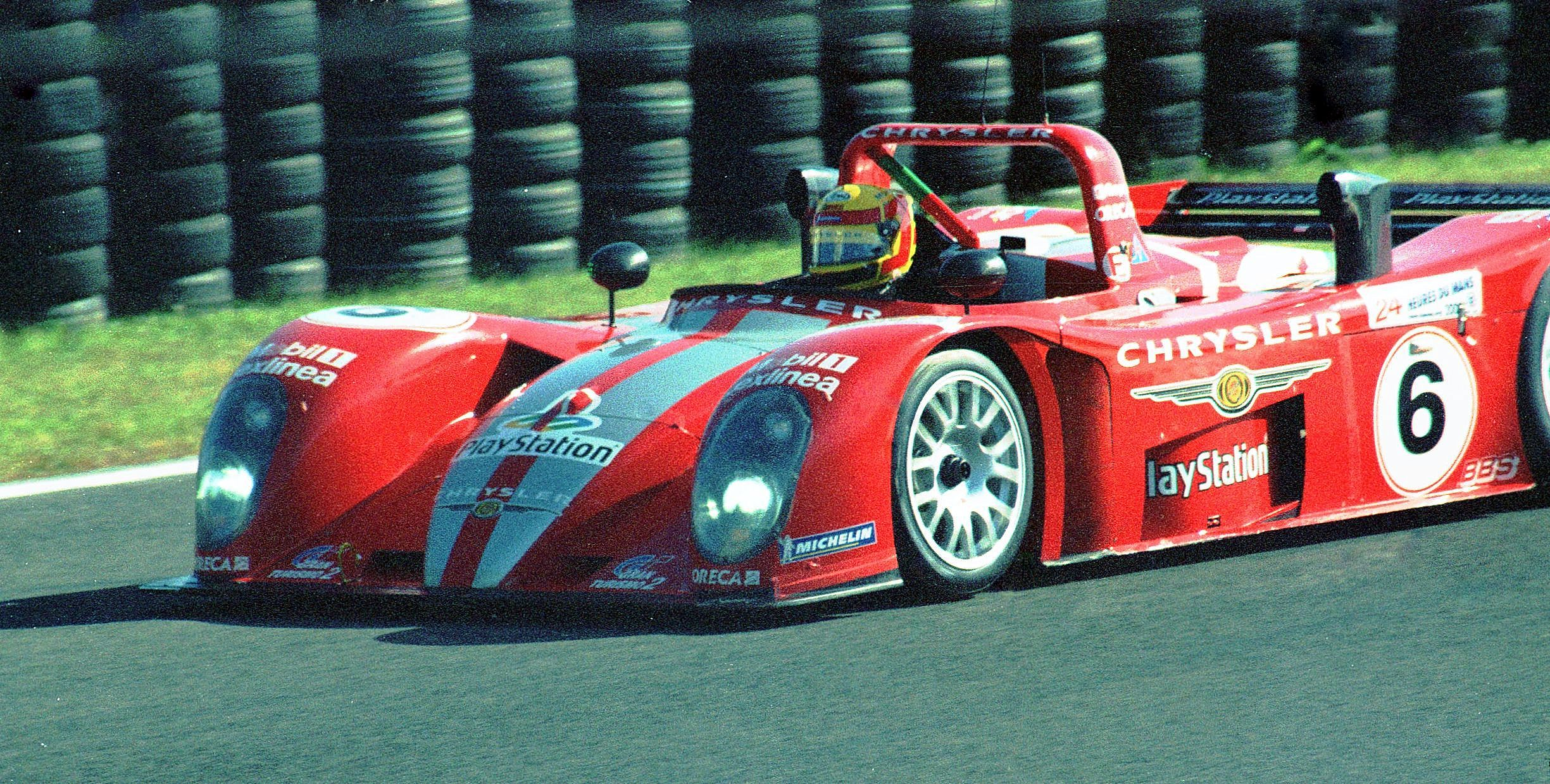
Van Hooydonk at the 2000 24 Hours of Le Mans.

After returning the German F3 in 2002, and finishing fifth overall, van Hooydonk was again promoted to F3000 and remained there for the 2003 and 2004 seasons, with moderate success. This was not enough to get him a drive in the new GP2 Series which replaced F3000 in 2005, and, despite a test with the MF1 Formula One team, he returned to tin-top racing by competing in the European Mégane Trophy for that year, finishing the championship in fourth whilst driving for ex-F1 driver Thierry Boutsen's team. He also is the first Champion of the Porsche Carrera Cup Benelux, winning it in 2013.

Van Hooydonk has also competed in endurance races at Zolder, Spa-Francorchamps and Le Mans.

== Racing record ==
=== Complete International Formula 3000 results ===
(key) (Races in bold indicate pole position; races in italics indicate fastest lap.)

Year	Entrant	1	2	3	4	5	6	7	8	9	10	DC	Points
1999	Witmeur KTR	IMO; Ret	MON; 10	CAT; 11	MAG; 4	SIL; 19	A1R; DNQ	HOC; DNQ	HUN; Ret	SPA; DNQ	NÜR; 12	17th	3
2000	Witmeur KTR	IMO; 13	SIL; 9	CAT; 4	NÜR; Ret	MON; 9	MAG; 19	**A1R**; 12	HOC; Ret	HUN; Ret	SPA; Ret	19th	3
2003	Team Astromega	IMO; Ret	CAT; Ret	A1R	MON; 8	NÜR; 8	MAG; 6	SIL	HOC	HUN	MNZ; 5	13th	9
2004	Coloni Motorsport	IMO; 6	CAT; Ret	MON; 7	NÜR; 8							11th	8
2004	Super Nova Racing					MAG; 13	SIL; Ret	HOC; 9	HUN; 9	SPA; 9	MNZ; 7	11th	8

=== 24 Hours of Le Mans results ===
Year	Team	Co-Drivers	Car	Class	Laps	Pos.	Class Pos.
2000	(France) Mopar Team Oreca	(Belgium) Didier Theys (France) Didier André	Reynard 2KQ-LM-Mopar	LMP900	292	20th	10th

Sporting positions
Preceded by Enrique Bernoldi	Eurocup Formula Renault champion 1997	Succeeded by Bruno Besson
