= Jarosław Wierczuk =

Polish racing driver

- Nationality: (Poland) Polish
- Born: 6 January 1977 (age 49) Warsaw, Poland

Jarosław Wierczuk (born 6 January 1977) is a former racing driver. One of the pioneers of Polish involvement in international sport racing.

Wierczuk was born in Warsaw, Poland. In 2001 he graduated from the Faculty of Management in Warsaw.

Wierczuk's racing driver career started with karting at the age of 15. After a three-year internship, the first professional team in Poland (founded by Krzysztof Woźniak), offered him starting positions. He took part in the prestigious Central European Zone Championships, and at the same time in the Championships of Austria, then in The German Formula Three Championships. He competed with drivers like: Ralf Schumacher, Nick Heidfeld and Jarno Trulli. He proceeded onto the Italian Formula 3000 and Formula Nippon.

Wierczuk participated in tests for the Formula 1 Forti Corse team. Wierczuk appeared as a Formula 1 expert on Canal+ and also on other Polish television racing programmes. Currently he also writes commentaries on Formula 1 for popular Polish websites.

In 2013, Wierczuk founded the Wierczuk Race Promotion Foundation which supports the most talented drivers in their careers.

Wierczuk is married to Emilia and has a daughter, Julia.

== Complete Formula Nippon results ==
(key) (Races in bold indicate pole position) (Races in italics indicate fastest lap)

Year	Team	1	2	3	4	5	6	7	8	9	10	DC	Pts
2000	Cosmo Oil Racing Team Cerumo	SUZ; 13	MOT; Ret	MIN; 8	FUJ; Ret	SUZ; Ret	SUG; Ret	MOT; 12	FUJ; 11	MIN; 12	SUZ; 11	NC	0
2001	DoCoMo Team Dandelion Racing	SUZ; 14	MOT; Ret	MIN; 13	FUJ; DNS	SUZ	SUG	FUJ	MIN	MOT	SUZ	NC	0
