= Mark Webber (racing driver) =

Australian racing driver (born 1976)

Mark Webber AO
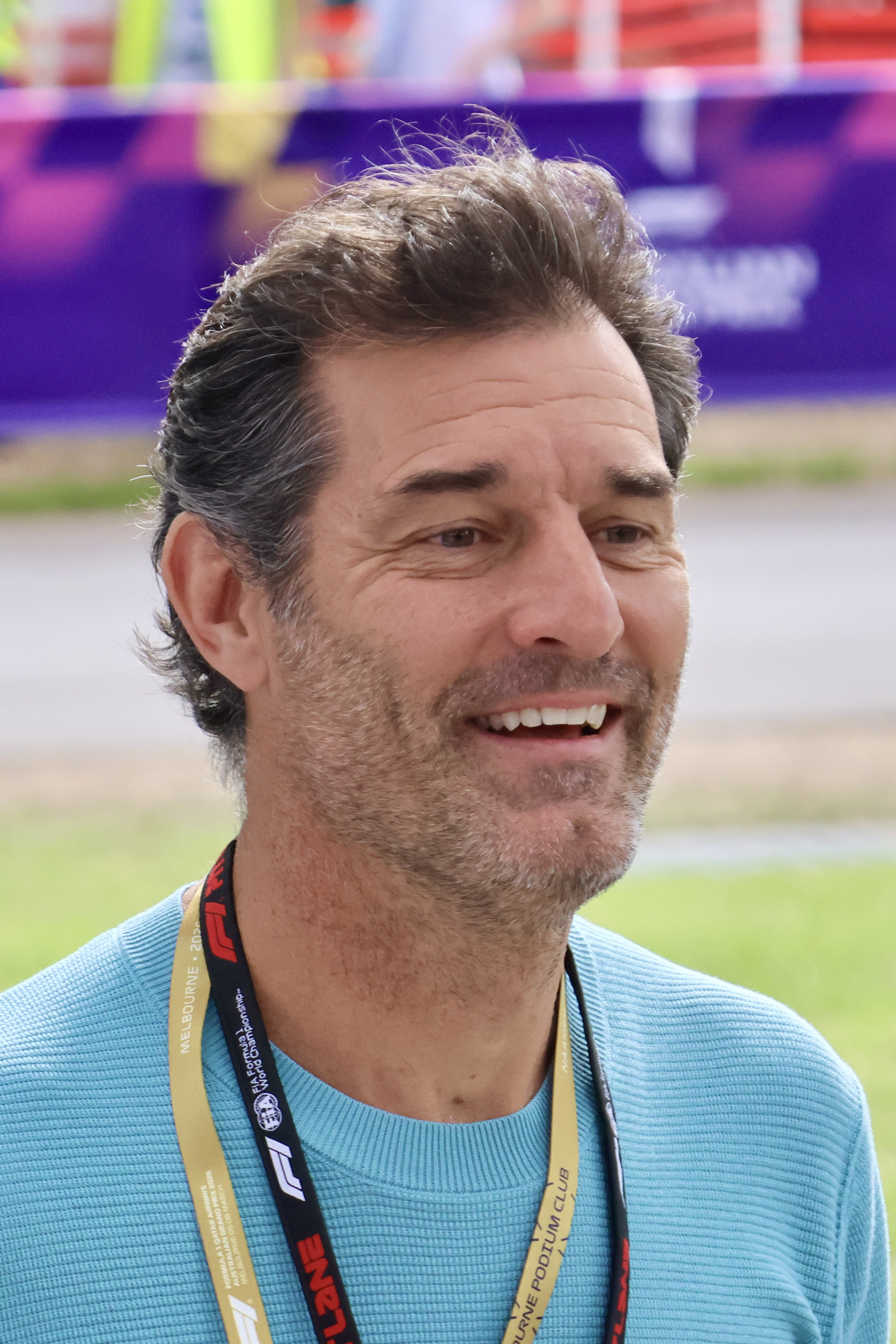
- Webber at the 2026 Australian Grand Prix
- Born: Mark Alan Webber; 27 August 1976 (age 50); Queanbeyan, New South Wales, Australia
- Spouse: Ann Neal (m. 2016)

Formula One World Championship career
- Nationality: (Australia) Australian
- Active years: 2002–2013
- Team(s): Minardi, Jaguar, Williams, Red Bull
- Entries: 217 (215 starts)
- Championships: 0
- Wins: 9
- Podiums: 42
- Career points: 1047.5
- Pole positions: 13
- Fastest laps: 19
- First entry: 2002 Australian Grand Prix
- First win: 2009 German Grand Prix
- Last win: 2012 British Grand Prix
- Last entry: 2013 Brazilian Grand Prix

FIA World Endurance Championship career
- Categorisation: FIA Platinum
- Years active: 2014–2016
- Teams: Porsche
- Starts: 25
- Championships: 1 (2015)
- Wins: 8
- Podiums: 15
- Poles: 8
- Fastest laps: 1
- Best finish: 1st in 2015 (LMP1)

24 Hours of Le Mans career
- Years: 1998–1999, 2014–2016
- Teams: Mercedes, Porsche
- Best finish: 2nd (2015)
- Class wins: 0
- Website: www.markwebber.com

Mark Alan Webber (born 27 August 1976) is an Australian former racing driver, broadcaster, and driver manager who competed in Formula One from 2002 to 2013. Webber won nine Formula One Grands Prix across twelve seasons. In endurance racing, Webber won the FIA World Endurance Championship in 2015 with Porsche.

Webber began karting at age twelve or thirteen and achieved early success, winning regional championships before progressing to car racing in the Australian Formula Ford Championship and the British Formula 3 Championship. He competed for two years opposite Bernd Schneider in the FIA GT Championship with the AMG Mercedes team, finishing runner-up in the 1998 season with five wins in ten races before finishing second in the 2001 International Formula 3000 Championship driving for Super Nova Racing. Webber made his F1 debut with the Minardi team in the 2002 season and finished fifth in his first race, the Australian Grand Prix. He moved to the Jaguar squad for the 2003 and 2004 championships. For the 2005 season, he was granted an early release from his contract with Jaguar and joined the Williams team, securing his first podium finish at the Monaco Grand Prix. Webber remained at Williams until 2006, driving for the Red Bull team for the rest of his F1 career. He won nine F1 Grands Prix, thirteen pole positions and finished third in the World Drivers' Championship in the 2010, 2011 and 2013 seasons.

Webber left Formula One after 2013 and moved to the World Endurance Championship, sharing a Porsche 919 Hybrid with Bernhard and Hartley in the fully-professional Le Mans Prototype 1 class from the 2014 to 2016 seasons. The trio won eight races in the final two seasons and the 2015 World Endurance Drivers' Championship. He retired from motor sport in 2016, becoming a television pundit for Britain's Channel 4 and Australia's Network 10 and a driver manager. Webber received the Australian Sports Medal in 2000 and was appointed Officer of the Order of Australia (AO) in the 2017 Australia Day Honours. Webber is an inductee of both the Australian Motor Sport Hall of Fame and the FIA Hall of Fame.

== Early and personal life ==
On 27 August 1976, Webber was born to middle-class parents, motorcycle dealer and petrol station owner Alan Webber and his wife Diane, (Note: The petrol station was set up by Webber's grandmother.) in the small New South Wales town of Queanbeyan located in the Tablelands, on the Queanbeyan River banks, near Canberra. His paternal grandfather was a firewood merchant. Webber has an elder sister, Leanne. He was educated at the nearby Isabella Street Primary School and Karabar High School (KHS). Webber represented KHS in athletics and rugby league and did Australian rules football, cricket and swimming after his mother encouraged him to get involved in as many sports as possible. At the age of thirteen, he was a ball boy for the rugby league team Canberra Raiders for a year and earned money delivering pizzas in the Canberra and Queanbeyan areas in his late schooling years. Webber also worked as an apprentice plumber and woodcutter.

Webber lives in the UK, in the small Buckinghamshire village Aston Clinton with his wife Ann Neal, his former manager, and is stepfather to her son from a previous relationship. Webber is a supporter of Sunderland A.F.C..

== Early racing career ==
Webber began riding motorbikes on weekends from about age four or five on his maternal grandfather's 2,500-acre (1,000 ha) farm. Webber was not encouraged to seriously take up motorcycling by his father, because he sponsored some local children who were injured in motorbike accidents. At about twelve or thirteen, he switched to karting, buying a go-kart from a school friend's father. He developed himself at a local indoor go-kart centre near his home. Webber received a second-hand worn out go-kart from his father in 1990 and drove it about once a month at the Canberra Go-Kart Club and in meetings in and around Canberra. Andy Lawson, owner of Queanbeyan Kart Centre, built karts around Webber's frame and Webber's father leased his petrol station and worked long hours at a car dealer to fund his son's karting activities. Webber opted for karting, and made his junior-level karting debut in 1991 aged 14, winning the 1992 Australian Capital Territory and New South Wales (NSW) State championships. In 1993, Webber won the Canberra Cup, the King of Karting Clubman Light Class titles, the 1993 Top Gun Award at the Ian Luff Advanced Driving School, and the 1993 NSW Junior National Heavy Championship in a Lawson kart with a larger, more powerful engine.

In 1994, Webber made his car racing debut, competing in the eight-round Australian Formula Ford Championship featuring non-aerodynamically dependent open-wheel racing vehicles fitted with treaded tyres. He drove Craig Lowndes' championship-winning 1993 RF93 Van Diemen FF1600 car that his father purchased. Webber achieved a season-high third at Phillip Island Grand Prix Circuit for 14th in the Drivers' Championship with 30 points and second in the Rookie of the Year standings. (Note: During the season, Webber worked with a team of three mechanics (including himself) who were not well acquainted with Formula Ford.) He was disqualified from the non-championship Australian Grand Prix Formula Ford support race for passing the field on the formation lap. In late 1994, Webber's father asked English-born media officer Ann Neal to locate sponsorship for Webber; Neal located support from the Australian Yellow Pages after she and Webber reviewed six proposals. Webber moved to Sydney from Queanbeyan to be closer to Australia's motor racing industry. When not racing, he earned money working part-time as a driving instructor at Oran Park Raceway defensive driving school.

Webber entered the 1995 Australian Formula Ford Championship with Yellow Pages Racing driving a 1995 Van Diemen car, finishing fourth overall with three victories, three pole positions and 158 points in a high-quality field. Webber finished second at both Mallala Motor Sport Park rounds of the 1995 Australian Drivers' Championship driving a Birrana Racing Reynard 90D-Holden car for seventh in the Drivers' Championship with 32 points. In October 1995, he moved to the London suburb of Hainault, to further his racing career. He entered the Formula Ford Festival at Brands Hatch with the Van Diemen factory team, and finished the race third. The result impressed team owner Ralph Firman Sr. enough to sign Webber to Van Diemen for both the 1996 European Formula Ford Championship and the 1996 British Formula Ford Championship, (Note: Webber earned extra capital working as a driving instructor at various race tracks across the United Kingdom.) finishing third and second overall, respectively. He won four races in the British series, finishing second in the championship behind teammate Kristian Kolby, and was also third in the Formula Ford Euro Cup driving two of the three rounds with a win at the Circuit de Spa-Francorchamps. Webber won the Formula Holden Australian Grand Prix support race, and the Formula Ford Festival.

In 1997, Webber elected to skip Formula Renault and Formula Vauxhall on sponsors advice, and signed a contract to progress to the higher-tier British Formula Three Championship with Alan Docking Racing (ADR). Webber was ADR's lead driver complemented by two funded non-competitive teammates, and was told to bring funding to ADR. Driving a Dallara F397 car powered by an old Mugen Honda engine purchased by the Webber family, he won the Brands Hatch Grand Prix event and came fourth overall with 131 points. Webber was voted Rookie of the Year as 1997's highest-placed rookie. His funding almost dried up mid-season until motor racing journalist Peter Windsor suggested Webber solicit funding from rugby union player and family friend David Campese to complete the year and stop Webber ending his international career early. (Note: The money lent to Webber by Campese was repaid by the former.) Webber's season was put on a race-by-race basis and he received offers from Renault and Jackie Stewart. He also finished third in the Masters of Formula 3 and fourth in the Macau Grand Prix for ADR. (Note: Mercedes-Benz paid for Webber to compete in both races.)

== Sports car racing and International Formula 3000 (1998–2001) ==
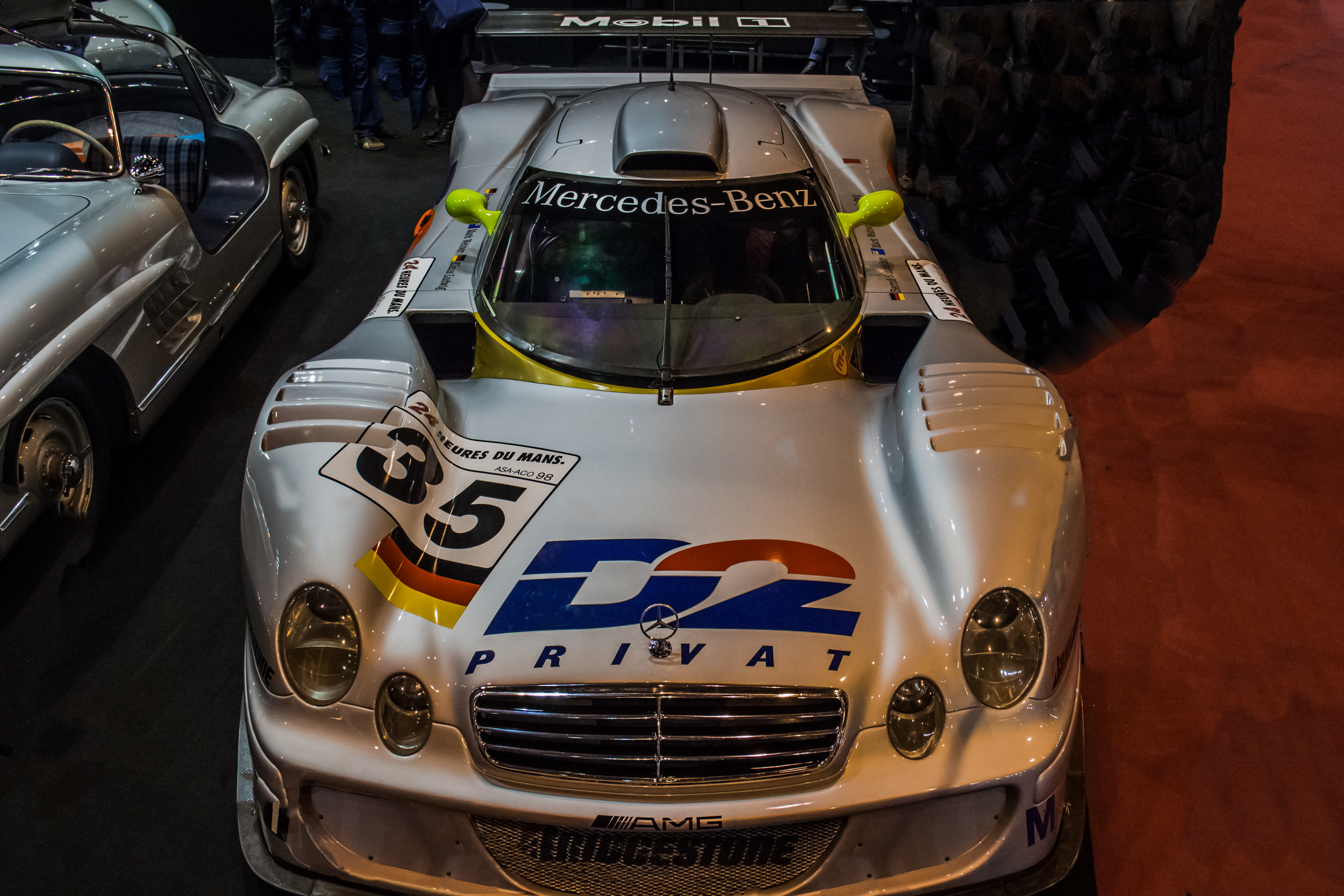
The front view of the Mercedes-Benz CLK-LM that Webber drove

After testing at the A1 Ring, Webber rejected an offer from Mercedes-Benz motorsports boss Norbert Haug to drive a CLK GTR car at the FIA GT Nürburgring 4 Hours in place of Alexander Wurz. However, he did agree to race for the AMG Mercedes team in the 1998 FIA GT Championship. (Note: A lack of financing at the time prevented Webber from entering Formula 3000.) Haug selected Webber after AMG Mercedes' Gerhard Ungar liked Webber's tenacity. Webber was paired with touring car driver Bernd Schneider, who mentored him driving-wise and in vehicle mechanics. Driving the No. 1 Mercedes-Benz CLK GTR, he and Schneider won five races and took eight podium finishes, finishing championship runner-up to teammates Klaus Ludwig and Ricardo Zonta after a title duel with the sister team lasting to the season's final round.

In June 1998, Webber entered his first 24 Hours of Le Mans having pre-qualified due to Schneider's 1997 FIA GT Championship win. He, Ludwig and Schnieder retired their Le Mans-specific CLK-LM car after 75 minutes due to a steering pump fault causing an engine failure. Late in the year, Campese Management managed Webber until Neal resumed her professional relationship with Webber; she suggested that Webber enter the International Formula 3000 (IF3000) in 1999 pending funding. Webber entered the 1999 24 Hours of Le Mans after the Fédération Internationale de l'Automobile (FIA) abolished the FIA GT Championship GT1 category due to a lack of manufacturer entries for 1999. Sharing the No. 4 Mercedes-Benz CLR with Jean-Marc Gounon and Marcel Tiemann, a car aerodynamic fault caused Webber to go airborne in qualifying between Mulsanne Corner and Indianapolis corner and on the Mulsanne Straight in race-day warm up, forcing his withdrawal from the race. (Note: He received minor injuries in both accidents.)

Webber's relationship with Mercedes-Benz cooled following Le Mans over the latter's suggestion that he was at fault for the accidents (during the race itself, teammate Peter Dumbreck would suffer a similar fate – this time caught on camera – thus proving that the car itself was inherently flawed). He rejected Haug's offer to compete in the American CART series. Greg Moore's death in an accident in California in October 1999 prompted Webber to focus on European single-seater racing. His Mercedes-Benz contract was terminated around November following negotiations. Webber subsequently pursued an F1 testing contract, the end result of which was a deal with Australian airline magnate Paul Stoddart's European Aviation F3000 team. At the beginning of the 2000 season, Stoddart announced that his team would become the Arrows junior team, with Webber also slated to test the Arrows F1 car later in the year. Webber finished third in the Drivers' Championship with 21 points, winning at Silverstone, achieving two podium results and retiring four times. Despite an impressive rookie season, his maiden F1 test faced a major hurdle when, prior to stepping into the car for the first time, he was presented with (in his view) an untenable contract. Having rejected the Arrows' team proposal, his offer to test their F1 car was rescinded.

For 2001, Webber moved to the Benetton Formula-affiliated, reigning teams' champions Super Nova Racing, replacing Nicolas Minassian. Webber, the title favourite, tended to overestimate the Lola car's grip whilst combining F3000 racing with regular access to F1 vehicles for testing. Webber won at Imola, Monaco and Magny-Cours and was second at the Nürburgring. Four consecutive retirements in the final four rounds prevented him from winning the championship, and he scored 39 points, finishing runner-up to Justin Wilson.

== Formula One career (1999–2013) ==
=== Testing (1999–2001) ===
Webber made his F1 test debut with the Arrows team in a two-day session organised by Stoddart at the Circuit de Catalunya in December 1999. Plans to drive the Arrows A21 car at Silverstone in July 2000 was cancelled, when he and Stoddart rejected a binding contract for 2001 from team owner Tom Walkinshaw. Webber received a three-day evaluation test at Estoril two months later following talks with Benetton. After that, Webber and his legal team agreed terms with Benetton team owner Flavio Briatore to be Benetton's test and reserve driver. He developed the car for racers Jenson Button and Giancarlo Fisichella for 2001 and would replace one of them if they got ill or injured. Webber tested frequently for Benetton and helped to improve the team's performance for the season's end. He joined Briatore's managerial stable in May 2001 on a ten-year contract when Neal said that she wanted to step back from driver management.

=== Minardi and Jaguar (2002–2004) ===
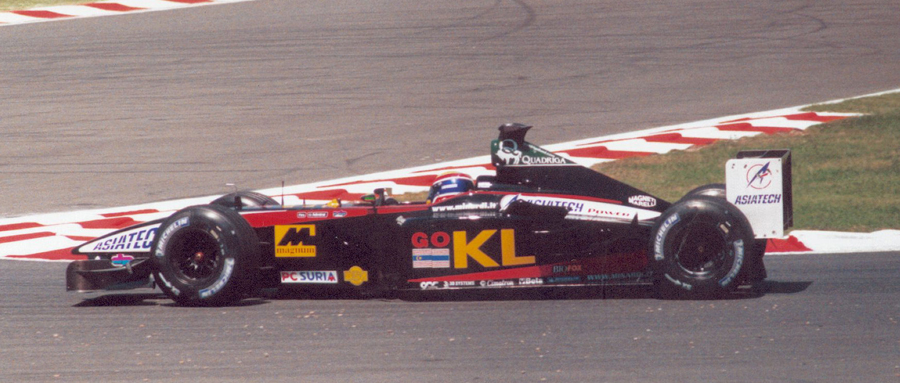
Webber driving for Minardi at the 2002 French Grand Prix

Ron Walker and telecommunications company Telstra successfully lobbied for Webber to replace Fernando Alonso at Minardi for the first three races of the 2002 season. Webber's Minardi PS02-Asiatech car was underdeveloped and he was barely able to fit inside it due to his height. He hoped to become experienced enough to make progress in F1. He qualified 18th for the season-opening Australian Grand Prix and finished fifth following a plethora of first-lap retirements in his debut race. Stoddart consequently retained Webber for the rest of the season. At the Spanish Grand Prix four races later, Webber and his teammate Alex Yoong were withdrawn from the race due to three wing failures during practice. He outperformed Yoong and the latter's two-race replacement Anthony Davidson since he was the only Minardi driver using power steering due to budgetary constraints. Webber frequently beat the Arrows and Toyota teams, and his best result for the rest of the season was eighth at the French Grand Prix. Webber was 16th overall with two points.

In 2002, Webber's management were concerned about Minardi's financial situation. They arranged a test session and evaluation in the more powerful Jaguar R3 in mid-2002. Toyota and Jaguar were interested in Webber, but he joined Jaguar in November 2002, replacing the ageing Eddie Irvine. Webber was underprepared as his Jaguar R4 car had a highly unreliable Cosworth V10 engine and rapidly wearing rear tyres. At the 2003 season's third round, the Brazilian Grand Prix, he qualified a season-high third but crashed after losing grip driving through water to cool his tyres late in the rain-affected race. Webber scored points seven times in 2003 with his best result being three sixth-places for tenth in the Drivers' Championship with 17 points. Webber crashed less frequently than he had done in F3000, and his qualifying and race pace saw him outperform both Antônio Pizzonia and Wilson. He was touted as a future star despite poor reliability and a weak car package.

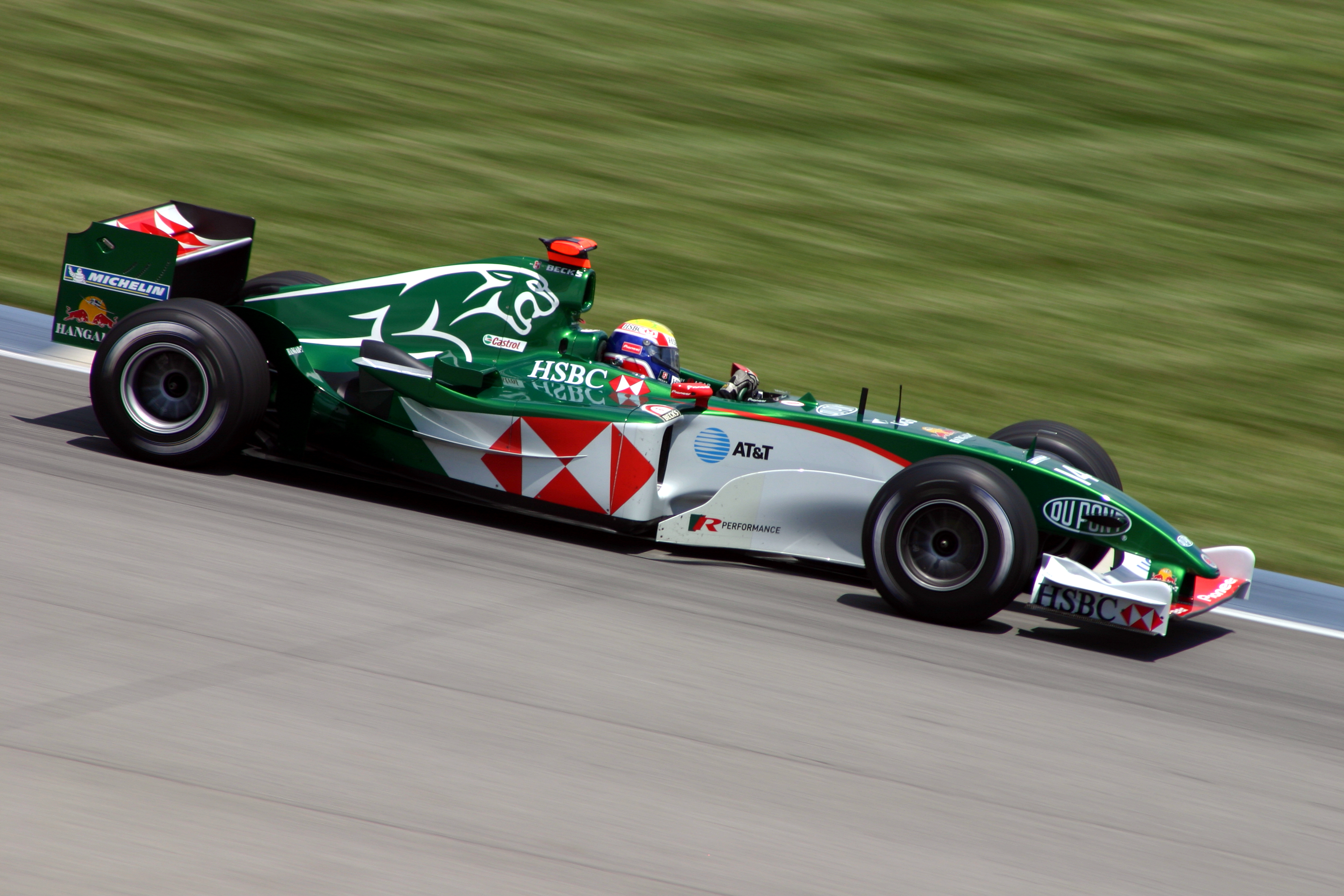
Webber driving for Jaguar at the 2004 United States Grand Prix

Webber was offered a five-year extension to his contract but signed a two-year extension instead. (Note: Enquires from Ferrari and McLaren ceased after Webber signed the contract extension.) During the 2004 season, Webber contributed to the Jaguar R5's technical development and was consistent year-round, extracting extra car performance and regularly outperforming his Red Bull-backed teammate Christian Klien. He drove the underperforming and unreliable R5 vehicle causing him to retire from eight out of 18 races. However, Webber scored points four times with a season-high start of second at the Malaysian Grand Prix and a best finish of sixth at the European Grand Prix. He placed 13th overall with seven points.

=== Williams (2005–2006) ===
Frank Williams, the Williams team owner, was interested in Webber and he and Neal thought driving for the team would advance his career. (Note: In mid-2004, McLaren team principal Ron Dennis spoke to Webber about a position at his team but declined when Webber's manager Flavio Briatore was barred from negotiations.) Webber activated a performance clause that released him from Jaguar if an improved offer came along. Williams released Sauber driver Fisichella from his contract with the team and Webber was signed by Williams to replace Fisichella for 2005. (Note: Williams selected Webber to drive for their team because of his approach to driving. Webber frequently visited the Williams factory in Grove, Oxfordshire to contribute to fixing multiple issues in making their vehicle quicker and more reliable.) He was granted an early release from Jaguar following the season-ending Brazilian Grand Prix so he could test for Williams, and prepared for the season by doing fitness training with cyclist Lance Armstrong at a training camp in Texas.

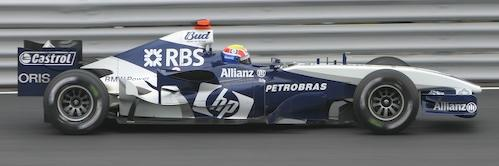
Webber competing for Williams at the 2005 Canadian Grand Prix

Webber replaced the Toyota-bound Ralf Schumacher at Williams, and was joined by Nick Heidfeld for most of the season and Pizzonia for the final five races following injury to Heidfeld. The Williams FW27 car was aerodynamically poor due to incorrectly calibrated wind tunnels, lacked race speed and was poor starting, seeing him lose positions after qualifying well. In a pre-season test session in mid-February, he sustained a broken left-side rib and damaged rib cartilage when he did not exercise correctly prior to driving. In the first two races of the season he competed on painkillers prescribed to him by FIA medical director Gary Hartstein to manage the pain from these injuries. Webber finished third in Monaco for his first F1 podium finish and tallied points in ten races in 2005. His best start was second in Spain and qualified within the top-five in the first seven rounds. Webber was involved in five race collisions and burnt his right hip in France due to heat generated by a failed external electronics box penetrating his car's cockpit. He was tenth in the Drivers' Championship with 36 points, admitting that his reputation faltered. Webber out-qualified Heidfeld nine times, beat him six times and out-qualifying Pizzonia five times that season.

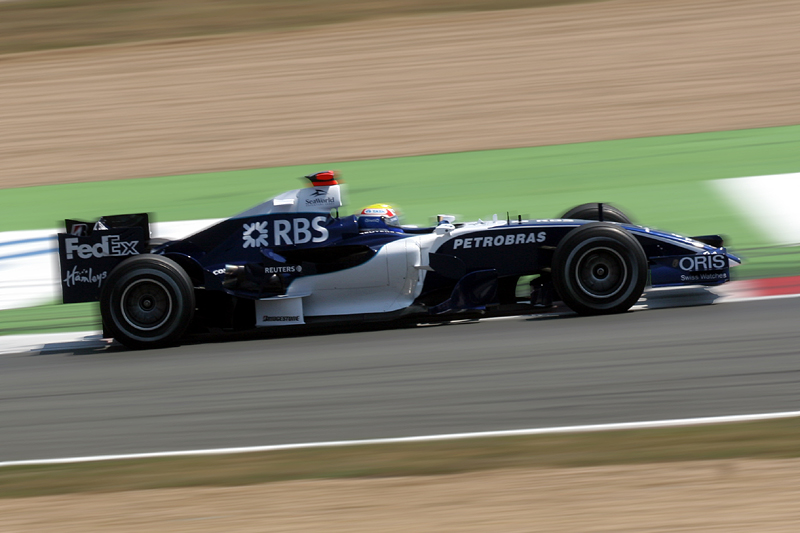
Webber driving in the 2006 French Grand Prix

Although Frank Williams and technical director Patrick Head made Webber aware of his poor performance, Webber remained at Williams for 2006 since no other driver wanted to drive for the team. He became distant from Williams and disliked its management because he expected to feel comfortable there; he stayed with the team because he felt "there was something left" and was loyal to Williams, and rejected an offer to join the BMW Sauber team. Webber's teammate that year was GP2 Series champion Nico Rosberg. His FW28 car ran Bridgestone tyres and a Cosworth V8 engine after BMW ended its partnership with Williams and purchased the Sauber team. His unreliable, under-powered car retired inside the top three in both Australia and Monaco early in 2006. Webber was 14th overall tallying seven points; his best results were two sixth places in Bahrain and San Marino.

=== Red Bull Racing (2007–2013) ===
==== 2007–2009 ====
Webber did not re-sign with Williams after he was offered less money for a two-year contract. Webber became disillusioned with F1 because their press relations would not let competitors speak freely to the press. Briatore directed Webber to the Red Bull Racing team; they became interested in the team after they purchased Jaguar in late 2004 and signed world championship-winning technical director Adrian Newey to design the RB3-Renault car. His switch from Williams to Red Bull was confirmed in August 2006, replacing Klien and partnering the experienced David Coulthard. His move to Red Bull had been surprising as it was formed to promote young drivers and the drinks company.

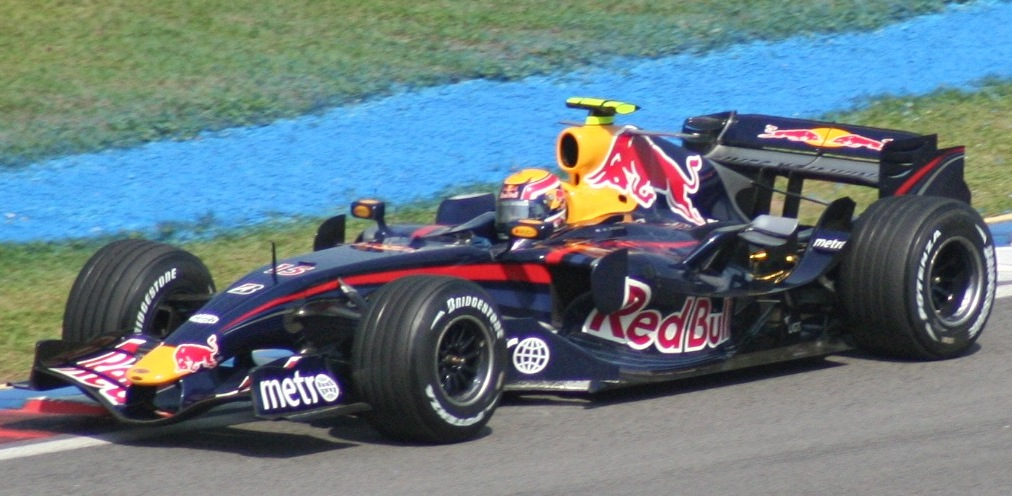
Webber competing for Red Bull at the 2007 Malaysian Grand Prix

Before the season, Webber enquired about Red Bull adviser and junior formula team owner Helmut Marko for his treatment of young drivers and was told by team principal Christian Horner to obey Marko to avoid conflict. The RB3 proved to be a quick but unreliable car, causing Webber to retire seven times during the season. He scored his first points of 2007 when he finished seventh in the United States and took his second career podium finish with a third-place finish at the European Grand Prix three races later. Webber scored once more that year with another seventh place at the Belgian Grand Prix. He was on course to finish well at the rain-affected Japanese Grand Prix until Toro Rosso's Sebastian Vettel crashed into the rear of his car behind the safety car, eliminating both drivers from the race. Webber tallied ten points for 12th overall and beat his teammate Coulthard 15 times in qualifying.

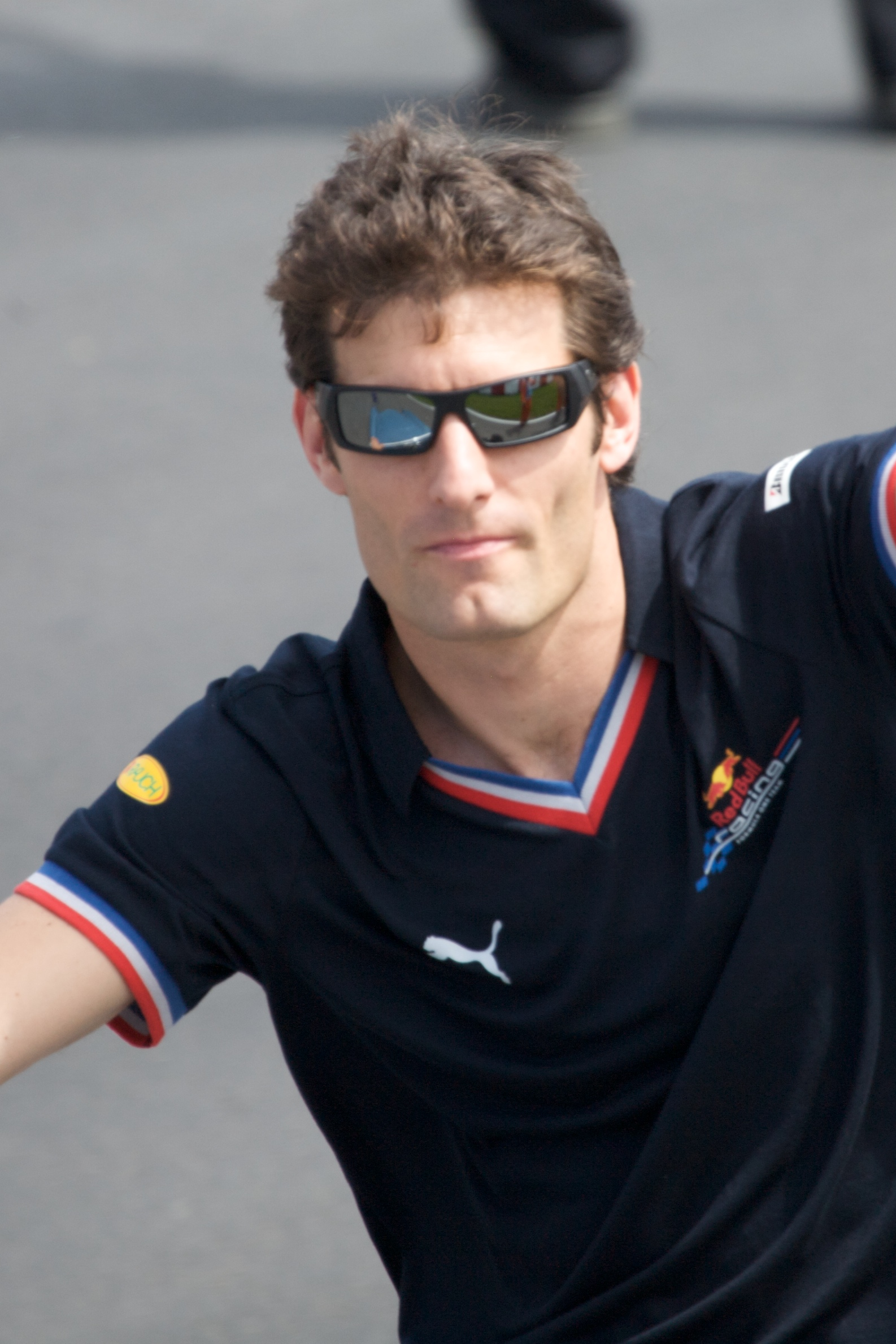
Webber at the 2008 Canadian Grand Prix

Webber remained at Red Bull for the 2008 season and was again joined by Coulthard, driving a more reliable RB4 car equipped with a new reliable gearbox and a heavier front. Webber frequently qualified well and scored points at nine of the season's 18 rounds. He occasionally outperformed drivers with better machinery and he scored points in six of the first eight races, which included a season-high fourth at the Monaco Grand Prix. He qualified a season-high second for the British Grand Prix but finished tenth in the wet-weather race. Thereafter, Webber's performance for the remainder of the season diminished mainly because Red Bull opted to sacrifice speed so it could focus on constructing a new car to comply with the regulation changes being applied for the 2009 championship. He scored points three more times in the final nine races for 21 points and 11th in the Drivers' Championship.

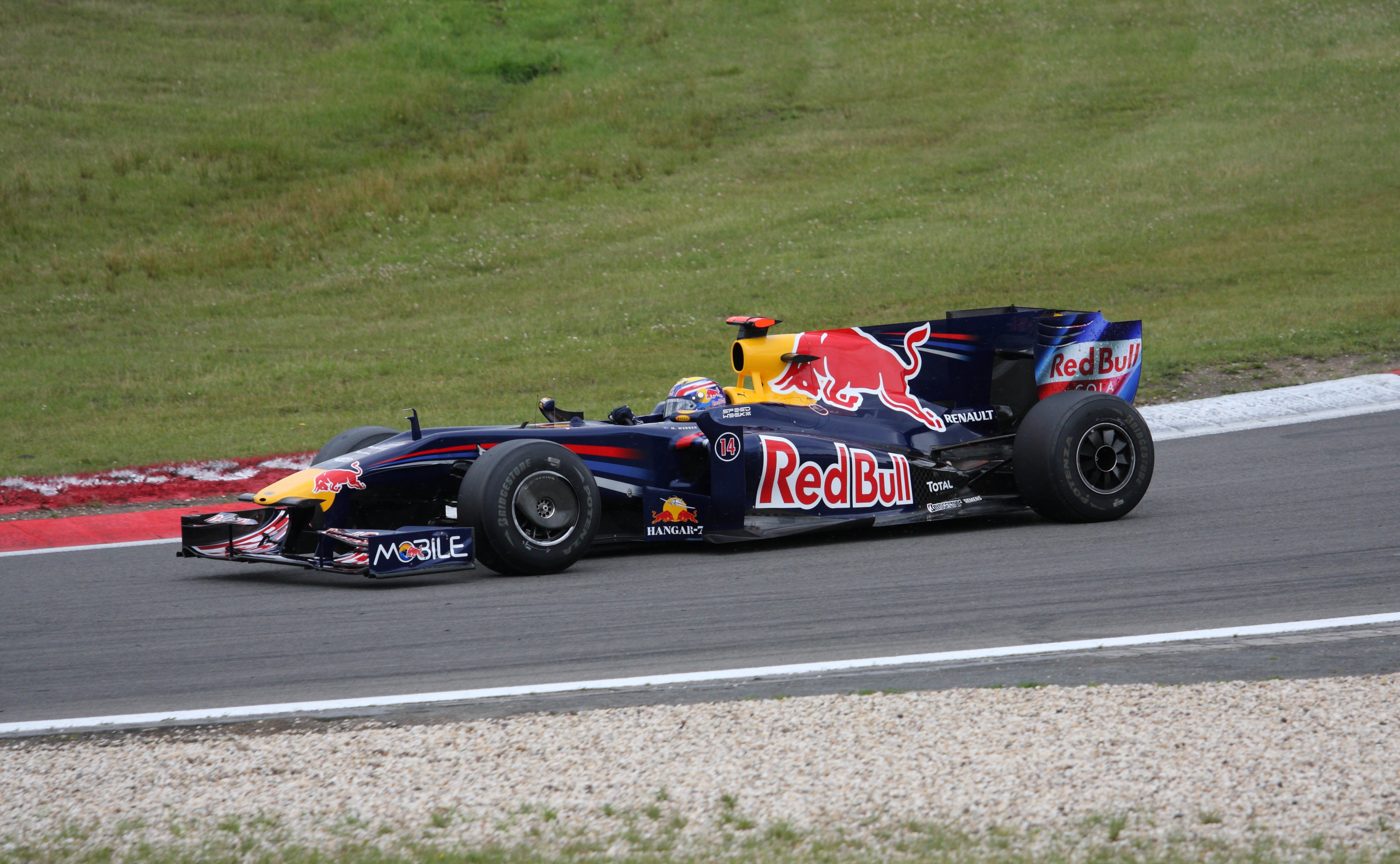
Webber achieved his first Formula One victory at the 2009 German Grand Prix.

Because of Red Bull's performance, Webber remained at the team for 2009. Webber sustained multiple injuries in a head-on collision with a car at a charity endurance cycling event in Port Arthur, Tasmania in November 2008, including a fractured right leg. He skipped a three-day pre-season test session held at the Jerez circuit, but was able to regain enough fitness to drive in an F1 car at the 2009 pre-season test sessions at Jerez and Barcelona, due to the late launch of the RB5 car. (Note: Webber also sustained a broken shoulder and open compound fractures to both the fibula and tibia.) Webber underwent surgery between events to avoid contracting infections.

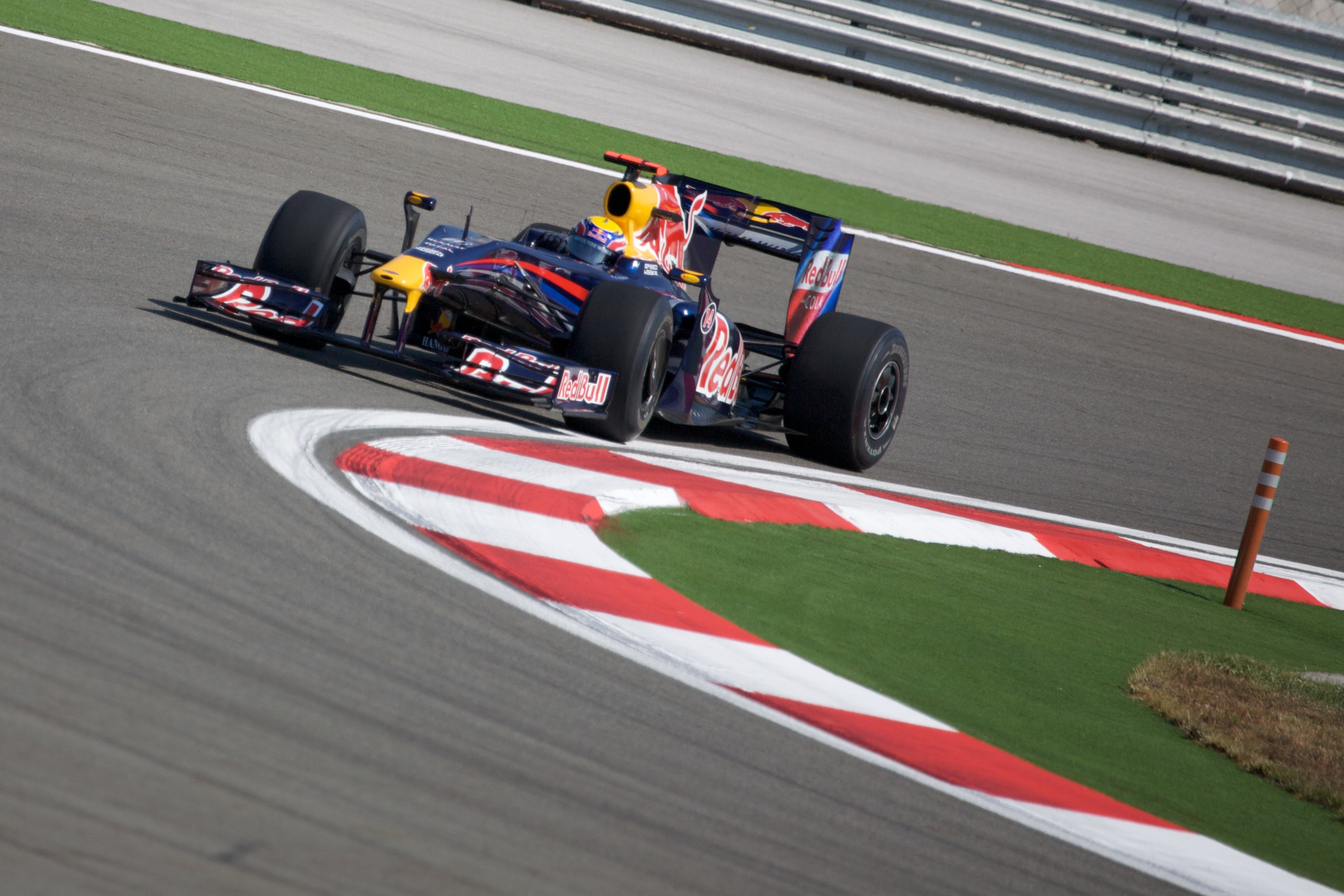
Webber at the 2009 Turkish Grand Prix

Vettel, who was promoted from Toro Rosso to replace the retiring Coulthard, became Webber's teammate. Webber consistently scored points in seven of the first eight races, including three podium finishes to briefly become a championship contender. His performances improved when the new RB5 car's double diffuser was introduced. At the German Grand Prix, Webber overcame a drive-through penalty he incurred for a first-lap collision with Rubens Barrichello's Brawn GP car to achieve his first career victory (the first win of an Australian driver since the 1981 Caesars Palace Grand Prix with Alan Jones) from his maiden pole position. (Note: By winning on his 130th Grand Prix start, he set the record for the highest number of career race starts before his first win. Sergio Pérez is the current holder of the record; he won the 2020 Sakhir Grand Prix on his 190th race start.) Webber was informed by Red Bull that he and Vettel could race each other "for the foreseeable future" even when trying to reduce Button's points lead. He moved to second overall after finishing third in Hungary but fell to fourth due to driver, team and reliability errors in the next four races. At the season's penultimate round, the Brazilian Grand Prix, Webber took his second career victory and held off Button to finish second at the season's final race in Abu Dhabi for fourth overall and 69.5 points.

==== 2010–2013 ====
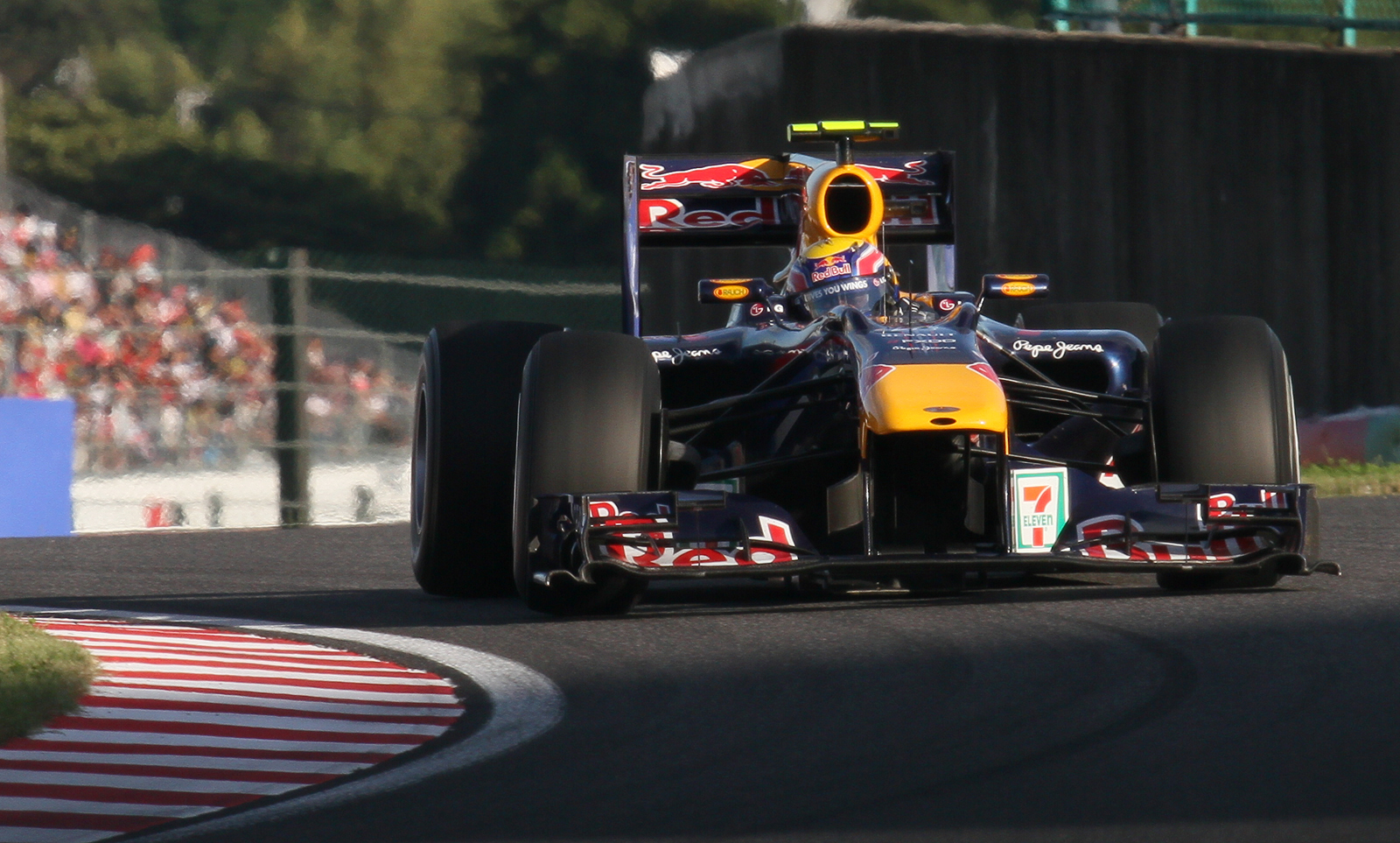
Webber driving at the 2010 Japanese Grand Prix

Webber and Red Bull negotiated a contract extension to the 2010 championship to reward his performance in 2009. His RB6 car was designed to channel engine exhaust gases through a bodywork slot to the diffuser's central area for more downforce and cornering speed. A knee injury sustained while biking forced Webber to delay his preparation because a surgeon conducted a full knee incision. Inactivity during surgery increased Webber's weight to 80 kg (180 lb); a strict diet kept his weight at 75 kg (165 lb). Upon his return to racing, he led the Drivers' Championship at various points during the season, achieving four Grand Prix victories and three pole positions. (Note: He used painkillers to finish the season after sustaining a minor right shoulder injury in a mountain bike accident before the Japanese Grand Prix. The injury was kept concealed from Horner; only Webber's physiotherapist and Harstein were made aware of it.) An accident with Rosberg at the Korean Grand Prix and a second-place finish at the following Brazilian Grand Prix put Webber eight points behind Alonso and seven ahead of Vettel entering the season-ending Abu Dhabi Grand Prix. Webber needed to win the race and for Alonso to place third or lower to secure the championship. He was eighth in the race, which Vettel won and Alonso came seventh. Webber was third overall with 242 points. After the season, Webber was angry with Red Bull's management, thinking they devalued his achievements that year. He collided with Vettel in a duel for the lead at the Turkish Grand Prix, which cooled his relationship with Marko who blamed Webber for the accident and favoured Vettel, something Webber felt again after Vettel received a new front wing intended for Webber at the British Grand Prix.

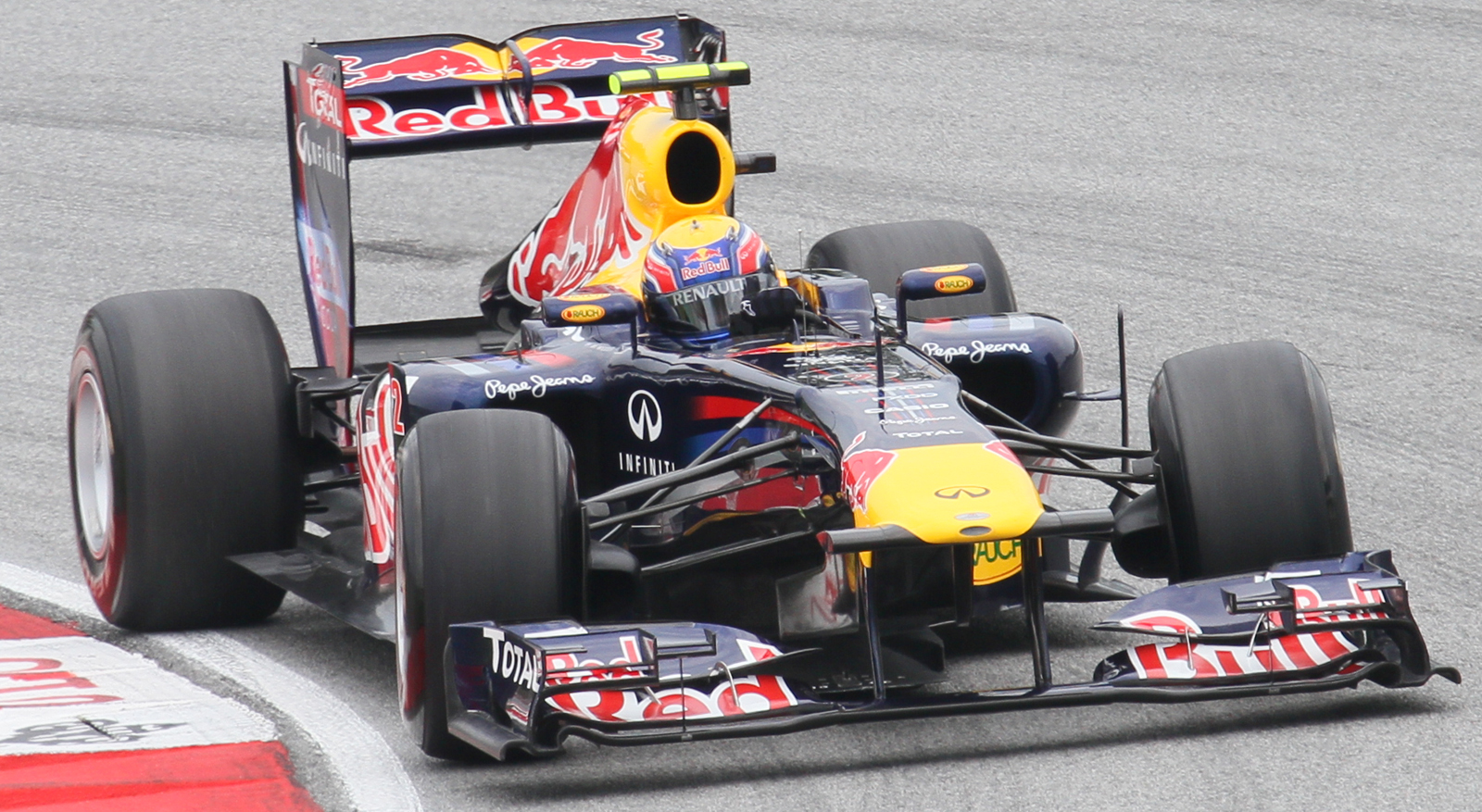
Webber driving in the final practice session of the 2011 Malaysian Grand Prix

Webber signed a Red Bull contract extension for the 2011 season before the 2010 Canadian Grand Prix, (Note: Webber was linked by the motorsport press to replace Felipe Massa at Ferrari for the 2011 season.) having agreed with the team to sign one-year contracts late in his career for ability and quality assessment. Webber's mental state worsened because he was ready to retire after a title win to stop all negativity related to his racing career. His RB7 car equipped with the kinetic energy recovery system (KERS) and drag reduction system devices and an exhaust-blown diffuser produced lots of rear grip. Webber was hindered by intermittent KERS failures that Red Bull rectified and he was frustrated with the quickly degrading Pirelli tyres losing their performance when a driver was in the aerodynamic turbulence of another car. He made slower starts due to the car's ballast distribution compromised by the KERS' additional weight exacerbated by him weighing 11 kg (24 lb) more than Vettel. (Note: Other factors included the moving of Red Bull's engineer who headed their starts performance group, a change in car clutch and a modified starting procedure. All three issues were corrected in the season's second half.)

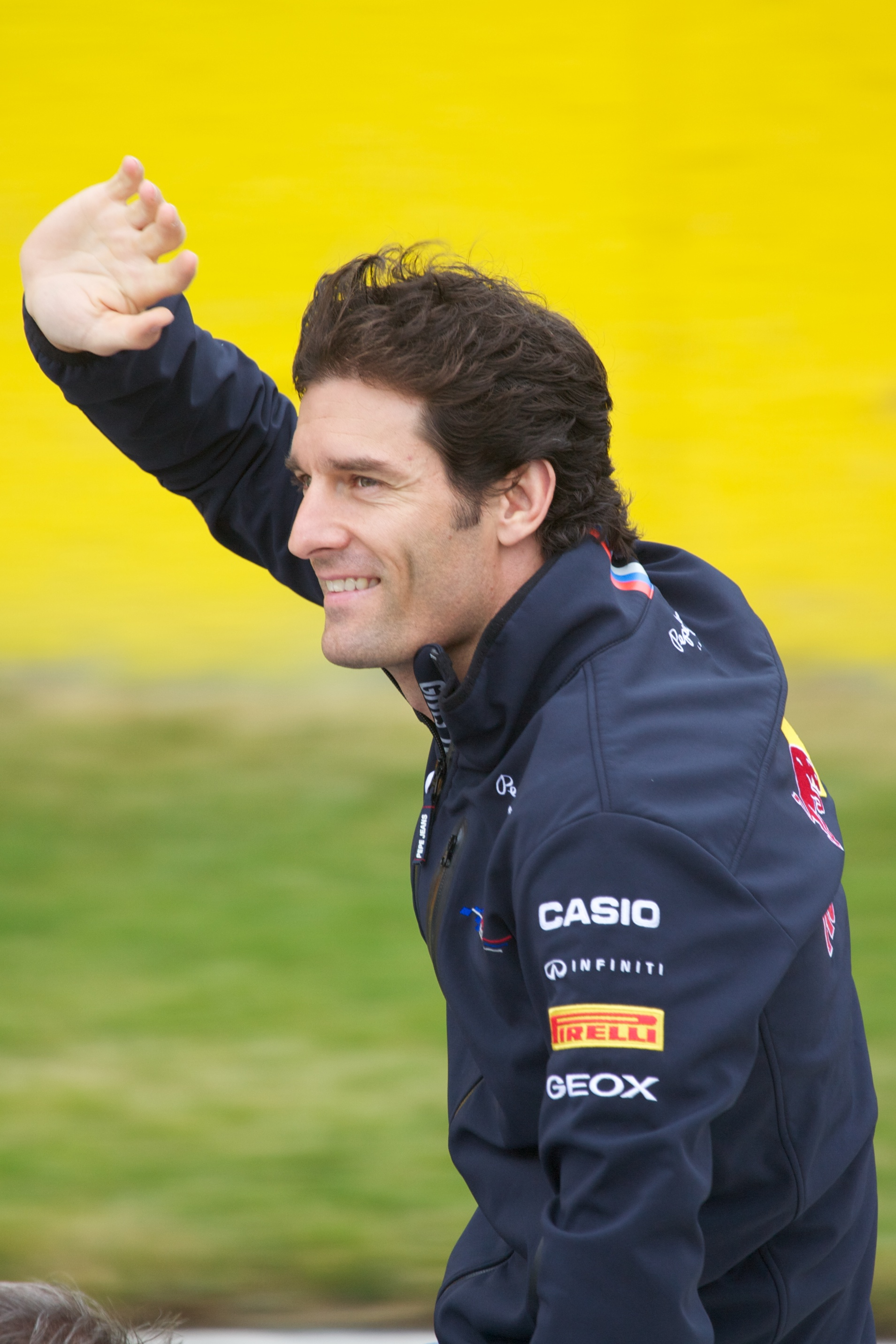
Webber at the 2011 Canadian Grand Prix

Dietrich Mateschitz, Red Bull's owner, directed the team to allow both Webber and Vettel to race each other. Webber came no lower than fifth in the first four races, finishing third and second in China and Turkey. He finished the Spanish Grand Prix fourth from pole position. Webber took consecutive pole positions at the British and German Grands Prix and seven podiums from eleven top-tens in the next 13 events. He won the season-ending Brazilian Grand Prix to take third overall from Alonso with a career-high 258 points. Webber initially struggled with the new Pirelli tyres, producing a greater amount of lateral load than his teammate Vettel and was more aggressive accelerating. His qualifying and race performances improved once he became better acquainted with the tyres. Webber made fewer pit stops by copying strategies used by other drivers after previously stopping more often from racing competitively.

Webber signed to remained at Red Bull for the 2012 season on the day of the Hungarian Grand Prix. Webber's decision to re-sign was made more difficult in mid-2011 because of his poor qualifying performance on Pirelli tyres but noted the potential of Newey's car designs. The RB8 car was not as dominant as its two predecessors; Webber finished fourth in the first four races, hampered by minor mechanical problems and faulty KERS. He became frustrated with F1 racing after a poor performance at the Spanish Grand Prix but he won the Monaco Grand Prix from pole position and the British Grand Prix three races later after passing Alonso with eight laps left to go second overall behind Alonso. Webber took two more podium finishes in Korea and India during the season's final 11 races, finishing 2012 sixth overall tallying 179 points.

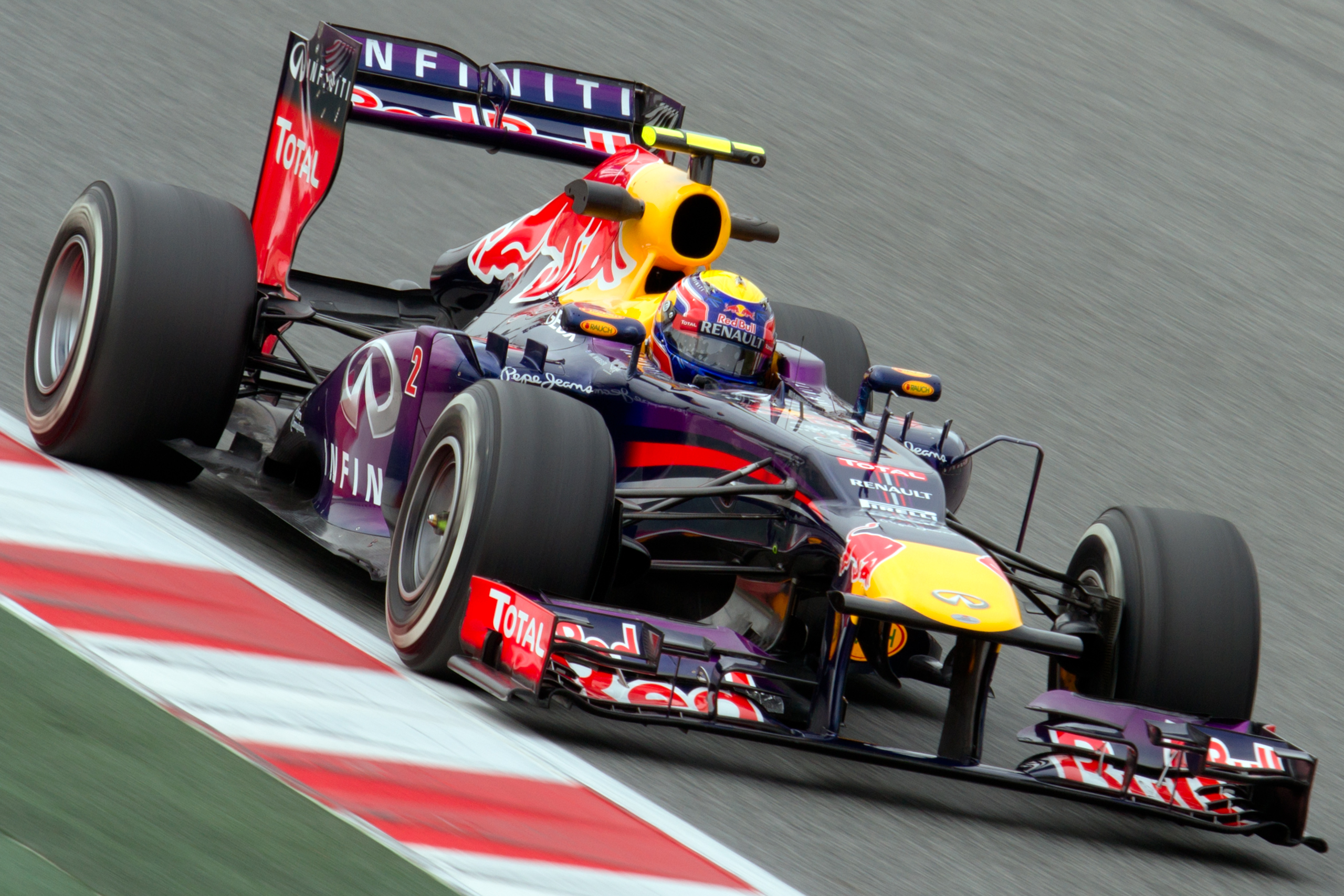
Webber testing his car during pre-season testing in Spain

Webber remained at Red Bull for the 2013 championship: he wanted to honour an earlier promise he had made to Horner and Mateschitz to stay at the team until his F1 career was over. He rejected an offer from Ferrari team principal Stefano Domenicali to partner Alonso and replace Felipe Massa for a year with a second optional, feeling switching teams would be inappropriate. He briefly lightened his training over the pre-season period when a titanium rod in his right leg was removed in December 2012. After restarting training that month, Webber decided to retire from F1 after 2013 because he wanted to spend more time with his family, demotivation with F1 since drivers could not criticise Pirelli's tyres for fear of possibly upsetting others and the politics when large sums of money were involved. Webber was assigned Simon Rennie as his race engineer when his previous engineer, Ciaron Pilbeam, became the Lotus team's chief race engineer. (Note: Before the 2013 season started, Red Bull advisor Helmut Marko suggested in an interview with Red Bull's in-house magazine The Red Bulletin that Webber could win on average two Grands Prix per season but be inconsistent all year. Marko also said Webber was unable to recover his form when his performance was sub-par. The comments prompted Webber to tell team principal Christian Horner that Marko was persona non grata.)

Webber's RB9 car initially struggled possibly due to its aerodynamic profile on the new softer Pirelli compounds but performed better when the 2012 compounds were re-introduced mid-season. (Note: Reports circulated in the paddock that Webber was denied access to a rumoured legal form of traction control technology on his car for cost reasons.) At the Malaysian Grand Prix, the season's second round, Webber was overtaken by Vettel in the closing laps to win the race after Vettel ignored the team order "Multi-Map 21", which instructed him to finish behind Webber. Tension between both drivers rose as a result and a remark by Webber about Vettel making an independent decision to disobey team orders meant Vettel lost Webber's respect as a person. After that, Webber was aware that the rest of the season would be onerous and tension between him and Vettel would stress Red Bull. He took eight podium finishes, finishing second four more times at the British Grand Prix, the Japanese Grand Prix, the Abu Dhabi Grand Prix from pole position and the season-ending Brazilian Grand Prix. Webber won no races in 2013 and he concluded his final F1 season in third overall with 199 points.

== Return to endurance racing with Porsche (2014–2016) ==
Webber joined Porsche's sports car team upon its return to motor racing in mid-2013. (Note: Webber told Horner and Matechschiz he would join Porsche, and he made the news public at the British Grand Prix. Ann Neal and his lawyer reviewed Webber's Red Bull contract and it stated he had to inform Red Bull if he was joining another F1 team but not if he wanted to leave the sport.) He moved to sports car racing to get away from the attention associated with F1 and to enjoy the longer intervals between races. Webber shared the No. 20 closed-cockpit Porsche 919 Hybrid sports prototype car with German Timo Bernhard and New Zealander Brendon Hartley in the FIA World Endurance Championship (WEC)'s fully-professional Le Mans Prototype 1-Hybrid (LMP1-H) category.

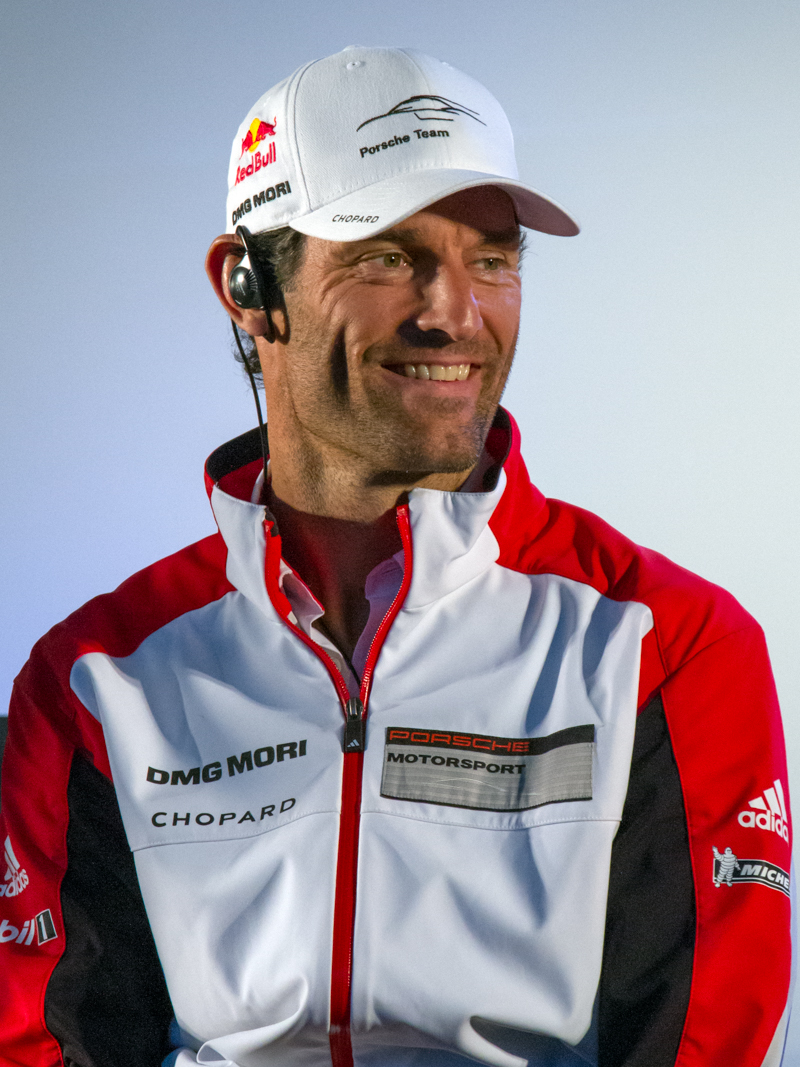
Webber at the 2014 6 Hours of Fuji

Although sports car racing was less physically demanding for Webber, he needed consistently high concentration to cope with the difference in speed between each of the WEC's four classes, driving at night, re-adjusting to lapping slower vehicles while losing the least amount of time and coping with changeable conditions during a long race. (Note: Webber would also have to deal with car imperfections, spending less time in the car because he shared it with two differently built drivers and sharing information in team meetings.) Webber was advised on modern sports car racing by Bernhard and in turn acquainted Bernhard and Hartley with the circuits he drove in F1. He was mindful on developing the car for his co-drivers and not for himself but directed Porsche to concentrate on research and development projects that optimised performance in the shortest possible time. Webber also helped the team reduce the amount of pit stop time.

The 2014 season began with Webber qualifying sixth and finishing third at the season-opening 6 Hours of Silverstone. Hybrid technical issues at the following 6 Hours of Spa-Francorchamps left Webber and his co-drivers 23rd overall. At the 24 Hours of Le Mans, Webber's team qualified the No. 20 car second and retired with a broken anti-roll bar 22 hours in. The next four races saw him finish no lower than sixth, placing third at both the 6 Hours of Fuji and the 6 Hours of Bahrain. At the season-ending 6 Hours of São Paulo, his team qualified on pole position; late in the race, Matteo Cressoni's No. 90 AF Corse-run 8 Star Motorsports Ferrari 458 Italia hit the right-rear of his car, sending Webber into a concrete barrier. Webber sustained a left lung contusion and severe concussion, recovering from the effects of the crash weeks later. He was ninth in the World Endurance Drivers' Championship (WEDC) with 64.5 points.

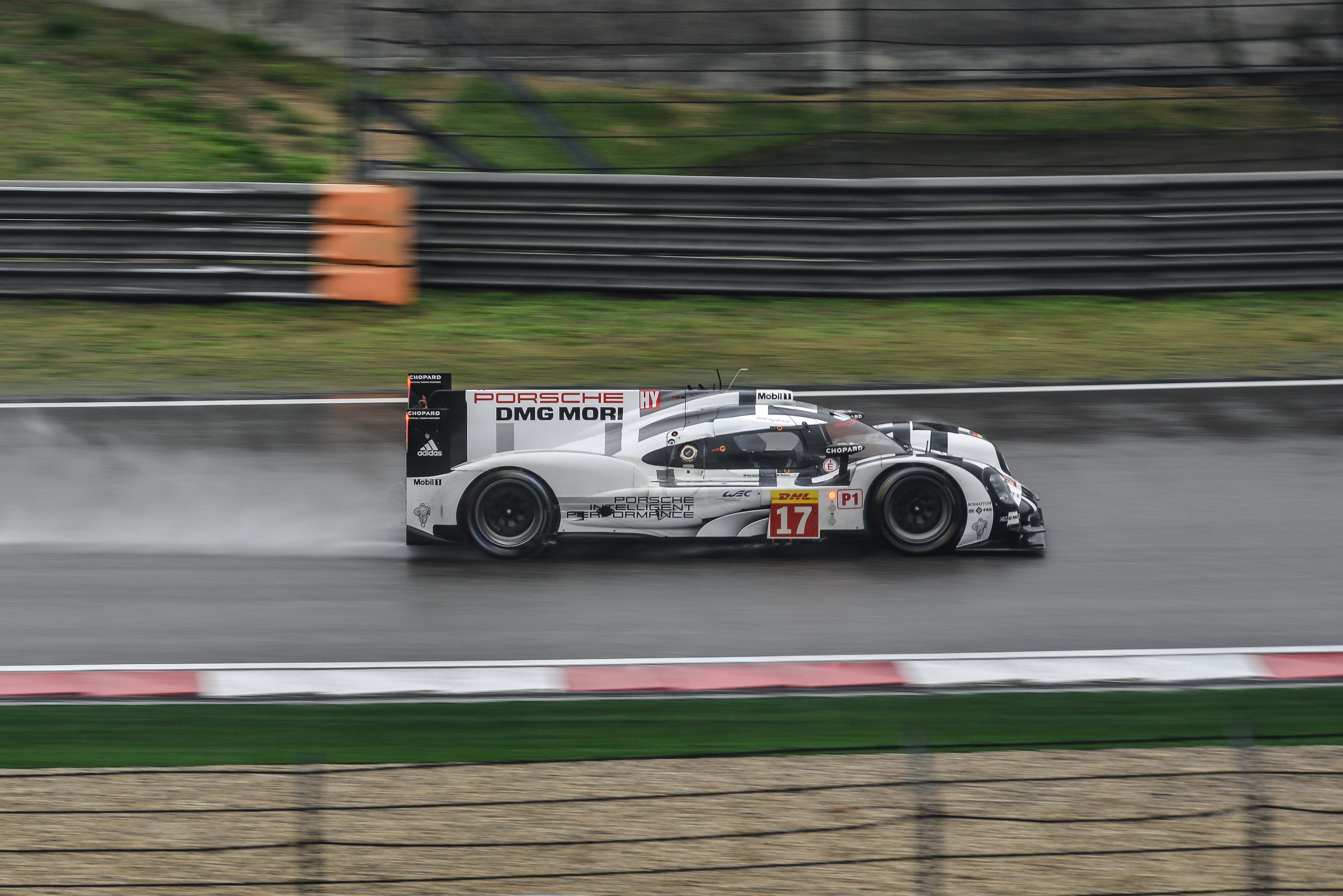
Webber driving for Porsche at the 2015 6 Hours of Shanghai

Porsche retained Webber for the 2015 season alongside Bernhard and Hartley in the renumbered No. 17 car. Webber and Hartley qualified the car on pole position for the season-opening 6 Hours of Silverstone but Webber had to retire it with drivetrain failure. He was on pole position at the following 6 Hours of Spa-Francorchamps and finished third after Hartley incurred a stop-and-go penalty for rejoining the track via an escape road. He qualified and finished second at the 24 Hours of Le Mans. before claiming four consecutive victories to enter the season-ending 6 Hours of Bahrain leading Audi's Marcel Fässler, André Lotterer and Benoît Tréluyer by 12 points. Webber and his teammates needed to finish third to win the WEDC. They qualified on pole position and overcame mechanical problems to finish fifth and claim the title with 166 points, five ahead of Fässler, Lotterer and Tréluyer.

Webber again remained at Porsche alongside Bernhard and Hartley in the renumbered No. 1 entry for the 2016 championship. The crew retired from the season-opening 6 Hours of Silverstone following a collision between Hartley and a slower Porsche GT car. At the following 6 Hours of Spa-Francorchamps, two tyre punctures and a front axle gearbox problem left him 27th overall. Webber began from second at the 24 Hours of Le Mans and finished 13th overall due to a water pump failure that needed fixing when Webber was driving. The rest of the season saw the crew win four of the next six races and qualify on pole position once for fourth in the WEDC with 134.5 points.

== Retirement (2017–present) ==
Webber decided to retire from motor racing after the season was over. He kept the news secret until going to Japan, citing Porsche's dwindling desire to commit fully to its LMP1 programme and the difficulty of doing "this job half-hearted" with regards of getting motivated to do test sessions and races as reasons.

Webber was due to compete in the American-based short track oval racing series Superstar Racing Experience in 2021; travel restrictions caused by the COVID-19 pandemic meant Webber was ultimately unable to do this.

== Driving style ==
In describing Webber's driving style, journalist Mark Hughes stated: "The thing he does arguably better than anyone else, is extract every ounce of potential from the car through fast, aerodynamically-loaded corners" since extra lap time could be located in slower turns because the car remains in them for longer. He was able to feel the braking grip of his tyres and could correctly modulate throttle power as grip levels reduced under braking to slow the vehicle down. Entering a braking zone, Webber achieved more retardation rate in a downforce-reliant car than other drivers and as the downforce decreased he was able to modulate pressure and sensitivity well to remain within the tyre's grip limit. His braking pressure force enabled him to translate lap time where the entry speed is high enough to make this possible without brake locking. His driving style, which was refined in downforce-heavy sports cars in the late 1990s, was not suited to a more gentle approach required for driving V8 F1 Pirelli-shod cars because of how he managed those brand of tyres that wore out faster than the Bridgestone compounds he was accustomed to.

== Non-driving work ==
The route map of the 2003 Mark Webber Challenge

Webber is a brand ambassador of the luxury fashion house Hugo Boss, the car brand Porsche, the watch manufacturer Rolex, the synthetic engine oil brand Mobil 1, the airline carrier Qantas, and the spinal cord injury research charity Wings for Life. In July 2003, he helped to launch that year's Road Safety Handbook aiming to give road safety guides for residents of Milton Keynes. As a result of his endorsement money and salary, he was included in Australia's Top 50 Sports Earners and the BRW Young Rich lists by BRW magazine. From 2009 to 2013, Webber and Horner co-owned the MW Arden junior team that ran in the European-based GP3 Series. He launched the off-road sports clothing brand Aussie Grit for mountain riding and running in 2018, and fronted Porsche and Boss' clothing collections for 2019 and 2020.

In 2003, Webber began the ten-day 1,000 km (620 mi) adventure challenge trek Mark Webber Challenge featuring cross-country running, cycling and kayaking in Tasmania to raise money for children's cancer charities. He organised it following his grandfather's death from cancer as well as his experiences of friends whose children had cancer. Webber held the challenge again from 2006 to 2008 but not in 2009 and 2010 due to economical problems. He again held the event with corporate and local government sponsorship from 2011 to 2013. Inspire Young People and Webber created the Mark Webber Youth Challenge in 2014 involving college student teams raising money for charity participating in physical activities. He was patron of the Amy Gillett Foundation promoting safer on-road relationships between cyclists and motorists, and of the Aylesbury College Trust. Webber won the F1 pro-am tennis tournament in Barcelona three times. He supported the use of the AI-operated prostate cancer diagnosis device Maxwell Plus in Queanbeyan in November 2021 following a reduction in testing during the COVID-19 pandemic. Webber became an ambassador of the Amber Foundation youth homeless charity in March 2023.

Webber has written columns for Autosport, the BBC, and The Sydney Daily Telegraph. He has provided expert analysis on F1 for the British television broadcaster Channel 4 since the 2016 season. Webber has done a similar role for Australia's Channel 10, covering the Australian Grand Prix and co-hosting the 2015 Clipsal 500 of the V8 Supercars Championship for the broadcaster. He was guest reporter for two rounds of the 2017 World Rally Championship on Red Bull TV. From 2019 to 2026, Webber managed racing driver Oscar Piastri and represents his commercial interests through the management arm JAM Sports Management he founded with his wife, and corporate and sports CEO Jason Allen. He authored the book, Up Front – 2010, A Season To Remember, in 2010. Webber's autobiography, Aussie Grit: My Formula One Journey, ghost written by Stuart Sykes, was published in 2015. Webber owned a public house, The Stag, in Mentmore. He joined documentary makers Noah Media Group as a producer and an investor in November 2021.

== Assessment and honours ==
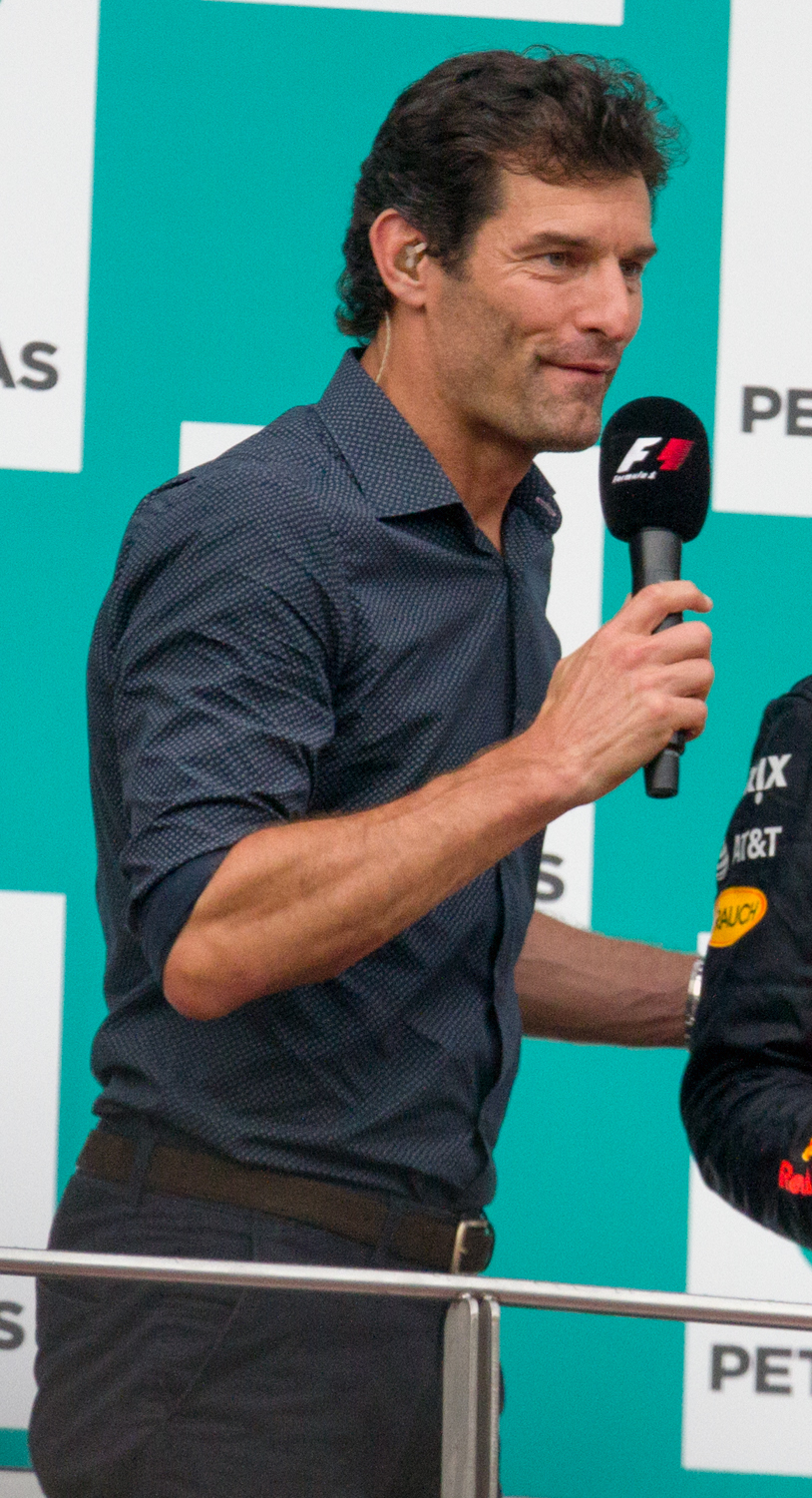
Webber at the 2017 Malaysian Grand Prix

Webber is nicknamed "Aussie Grit" for "his determination in the face of adversity and his patriotism." Bruce Jones described Webber in the book The Story of Formula One: 65 Years of Life in the Fast Lane as having earned "considerable admiration for his straight-talking, honest approach that was devoid of pretence or hyperbole. He is an out-and-out racer cast from something of an old-fashioned mould and as such often seemed an adult in an increasingly infantile world." BBC Sport's Andrew Benson wrote that Webber's "combination of race-winning pace and forthright manner has made him a central figure in F1 over the last decade" and that Webber had "remained true to himself. He is unimpressed with the trappings of F1 and its supposed glamour. And his willingness to follow his own mind is intact."

In October 2003, Webber was unanimously voted fourth director of the trade union Grand Prix Drivers' Association (GPDA). He was voted out of it in September 2005 since it felt there were too many directors in charge. Webber was voted back in the GPDA as a director in September 2006, resigning in March 2010. He won the BRDC Bruce McLaren Award in 1998, 2000, 2001, 2009, and 2010 as "the Commonwealth driver who has established the most meritorious performances in international motor racing." In October 2000, he received the Australian Sports Medal for placing second in the 1998 FIA GT Championship and participating in the IF3000 Championship; was voted "Rookie of the Year" by both readers of F1 Racing and Autosport magazines; named "F1 Newcomer of the Year" at the annual Grand Prix Party Awards; was named Autocar magazine's 2003 F1 Driver of the Year; won the Lorenzo Bandini Trophy in 2006; and the 2009 Innes Ireland Trophy for displaying "courage and sportsmanship" that Innes Ireland epitomised.

Webber received the Hawthorn Memorial Trophy in 2010 and 2013 as the most successful British or Commonwealth driver during a season; the 2010 GQ Australia Sportsman of the Year; the 2011 DHL Fastest Lap Award for setting more fastest laps than any driver that year with seven; the 2013 Johnny Wakefield Trophy for recording the year's best lap on the Silverstone GP Circuit, and the Peter Brock Medal in 2017. He was appointed Officer of the Order of Australia (AO) in the 2017 Australia Day Honours for "distinguished service to motor sport as a competitor and ambassador, and to the community through fundraising and patronage of a range of medical and youth support organisations." Webber was added to the Australian Motor Sport Hall of Fame in 2018, the FIA Hall of Fame in 2019, and the Sport Australia Hall of Fame in 2022.

== Racing record ==
=== Career summary ===
Season	Series	Team	Races	Wins	Poles	F/laps	Podiums	Points	Position
1994	Australian Formula Ford Championship	Mark Webber	16	0	0	?	1	30	13th
1995	Australian Formula Ford Championship	Yellow Pages Racing	16	3	3	?	?	158	4th
1995	Australian Drivers' Championship	Birrana Racing	2	0	0	0	2	32	8th
1995	Formula Ford Festival	Van Diemen	1	0	0	0	1	N/A	**3rd**
1996	European Formula Ford Championship	Van Diemen	?	?	?	?	?	?	**3rd**
1996	British Formula Ford Championship	Van Diemen	?	?	?	?	?	113	**2nd**
1996	Formula Ford Festival	Van Diemen	1	1	0	0	1	N/A	**1st**
1996	Australian Drivers' Championship	Ralt Australia	2	1	0	0	1	20	10th
1997	British Formula 3 Championship	Alan Docking Racing	16	1	3	1	5	127	4th
1997	Macau Grand Prix	Alan Docking Racing	1	0	0	0	0	N/A	4th
1997	Masters of Formula 3	Alan Docking Racing	1	0	0	0	1	N/A	**3rd**
1998	FIA GT Championship	AMG Mercedes	10	5	0	0	8	69	**2nd**
1998	24 Hours of Le Mans	AMG Mercedes	1	0	1	0	0	N/A	NC
1999	24 Hours of Le Mans	AMG Mercedes	1	0	0	0	0	N/A	DNS
2000	International Formula 3000	European Arrows	10	1	0	2	3	21	**3rd**
2000	Formula One	Arrows F1 Team	Test driver						
2001	International Formula 3000	Super Nova Racing	12	3	2	3	4	39	**2nd**
2001	Formula One	Mild Seven Benetton Renault	Test driver						
2002	Formula One	KL Minardi Asiatech	17	0	0	0	0	2	16th
2003	Formula One	Jaguar Racing F1 Team	16	0	0	0	0	17	10th
2004	Formula One	Jaguar Racing F1 Team	18	0	0	0	0	7	13th
2005	Formula One	BMW Williams F1 Team	19	0	0	0	1	36	10th
2006	Formula One	Williams F1 Team	18	0	0	0	0	7	14th
2007	Formula One	Red Bull Racing	17	0	0	0	1	10	12th
2008	Formula One	Red Bull Racing	18	0	0	0	0	21	11th
2009	Formula One	Red Bull Racing	17	2	1	3	8	69.5	4th
2010	Formula One	Red Bull Racing	19	4	5	3	10	242	**3rd**
2011	Formula One	Red Bull Racing	19	1	3	7	10	258	**3rd**
2012	Formula One	Red Bull Racing	20	2	2	1	4	179	6th
2013	Formula One	Infiniti Red Bull Racing	19	0	2	5	8	199	**3rd**
2014	FIA World Endurance Championship	Porsche Team	8	0	1	1	3	64.5	9th
2014	24 Hours of Le Mans	Porsche Team	1	0	0	0	0	N/A	NC
2015	FIA World Endurance Championship	Porsche Team	8	4	5	0	6	166	**1st**
2015	24 Hours of Le Mans	Porsche Team	1	0	0	0	0	N/A	**2nd**
2016	FIA World Endurance Championship	Porsche Team	9	4	2	0	6	134.5	4th
2016	24 Hours of Le Mans	Porsche Team	1	0	0	0	0	N/A	13th

=== Complete British Formula 3 results ===
(key) (Races in bold indicate pole position) (Races in italics indicate fastest lap)

Year	Team	Engine	Class	1	2	3	4	5	6	7	8	9	10	11	12	13	14	15	16	DC	Pts
1997	Alan Docking Racing	Mugen	A	DON; 6	SIL; 6	THR; Ret	**BRH**; 1	**SIL**; 8	CRO; 4	OUL; 8	SIL; 2	**PEM**; 4	PEM; 3	DON; 4	SNE; Ret	SNE; 6	SPA; 4	SIL; 3	THR; 7	4th	131

=== Complete FIA GT Championship results ===
Year	Entrant	Class	Chassis	Engine	1	2	3	4	5	6	7	8	9	10	Rank	Points
1998	AMG Mercedes	GT1	Mercedes-Benz CLK LM	Mercedes-Benz M119 6.0L V8	OSC; 3	SIL; 1	**HOC**; 1	**DIJ**; 11	**HUN**; 1	**SUZ**; 1	DON; 1	A1R; 2	HMS; 4	LAG; 2	**2nd**	**69**

=== Complete 24 Hours of Le Mans results ===
Year	Team	Co-drivers	Car	Class	Laps	Pos.	Class pos.
1998	(Germany) AMG-Mercedes	(Germany) Klaus Ludwig (Germany) Bernd Schneider	Mercedes-Benz CLK-LM	GT1	19	DNF	DNF
1999	(Germany) AMG-Mercedes	(France) Jean-Marc Gounon (Germany) Marcel Tiemann	Mercedes-Benz CLR	LMGTP	0	DNS	DNS
2014	(Germany) Porsche Team	(Germany) Timo Bernhard (New Zealand) Brendon Hartley	Porsche 919 Hybrid	LMP1-H	346	NC	NC
2015	(Germany) Porsche Team	(Germany) Timo Bernhard (New Zealand) Brendon Hartley	Porsche 919 Hybrid	LMP1	394	**2nd**	**2nd**
2016	(Germany) Porsche Team	(Germany) Timo Bernhard (New Zealand) Brendon Hartley	Porsche 919 Hybrid	LMP1	346	13th	5th

=== Complete International Formula 3000 results ===
(key) (Races in bold indicate pole position) (Races in italics indicate fastest lap; small number denotes finishing position)

Year	Entrant	1	2	3	4	5	6	7	8	9	10	11	12	DC	Points
2000	European Arrows F3000	IMO; 3	SIL; 1	CAT; Ret	NUR; Ret	MON; Ret	MAG; 16	A1R; 4	HOC; 3	HUN; 9	SPA; 16			3rd	21
2001	Super Nova Racing	INT; 7	**IMO**; 1	CAT; 7	A1R; Ret	**MON**; 1	NUR; 2	MAG; 1	SIL; 4	HOC; Ret	HUN; Ret	SPA; Ret	MNZ; Ret	2nd	39

=== Complete Formula One results ===
(key) (Races in bold indicate pole position) (Races in italics indicate fastest lap; small number denotes finishing position)

Year	Entrant	Chassis	Engine	1	2	3	4	5	6	7	8	9	10	11	12	13	14	15	16	17	18	19	20	WDC	Points
2002	KL Minardi Asiatech	Minardi PS02	Asiatech AT02 3.0 V10	AUS; 5	MAL; Ret	BRA; 11	SMR; 11	ESP; WD	AUT; 12	MON; 11	CAN; 11	EUR; 15	GBR; Ret	FRA; 8	GER; Ret	HUN; 16	BEL; Ret	ITA; Ret	USA; Ret	JPN; 10				16th	2
2003	HSBC Jaguar Racing F1 Team	Jaguar R4	Cosworth CR-5 3.0 V10	AUS; Ret	MAL; Ret	BRA; 9^{†}	SMR; Ret	ESP; 7	AUT; 7	MON; Ret	CAN; 7	EUR; 6	FRA; 6	GBR; 14	GER; 11^{†}	HUN; 6	ITA; 7	USA; Ret	JPN; 11					10th	17
2004	HSBC Jaguar Racing F1 Team	Jaguar R5	Cosworth CR-6 3.0 V10	AUS; Ret	MAL; Ret	BHR; 8	SMR; 13	ESP; 12	MON; Ret	EUR; 7	CAN; Ret	USA; Ret	FRA; 9	GBR; 8	GER; 6	HUN; 10	BEL; Ret	ITA; 9	CHN; 10	JPN; Ret				13th	7
2004	HSBC Jaguar Racing F1 Team	Jaguar R5B	Cosworth CR-6 3.0 V10																		BRA; Ret			13th	7
2005	BMW Williams F1 Team	Williams FW27	BMW P84/5 3.0 V10	AUS; 5	MAL; Ret	BHR; 6	SMR; 7	ESP; 6	MON; 3	EUR; Ret	CAN; 5	USA; DNS	FRA; 12	GBR; 11	GER; NC	HUN; 7	TUR; Ret	ITA; 14	BEL; 4	BRA; NC	JPN; 4	CHN; 7		10th	36
2006	Williams F1 Team	Williams FW28	Cosworth CA2006 2.4 V8	BHR; 6	MAL; Ret	AUS; Ret	SMR; 6	EUR; Ret	ESP; 9	MON; Ret	GBR; Ret	CAN; 12	USA; Ret	FRA; Ret	GER; Ret	HUN; Ret	TUR; 10	ITA; 10	CHN; 8	JPN; Ret	BRA; Ret			14th	7
2007	Red Bull Racing	Red Bull RB3	Renault RS27 2.4 V8	AUS; 13	MAL; 10	BHR; Ret	ESP; Ret	MON; Ret	CAN; 9	USA; 7	FRA; 12	GBR; Ret	EUR; 3	HUN; 9	TUR; Ret	ITA; 9	BEL; 7	JPN; Ret	CHN; 10	BRA; Ret				12th	10
2008	Red Bull Racing	Red Bull RB4	Renault RS27-2008 2.4 V8	AUS; Ret	MAL; 7	BHR; 7	ESP; 5	TUR; 7	MON; 4	CAN; 12	FRA; 6	GBR; 10	GER; Ret	HUN; 9	EUR; 12	BEL; 8	ITA; 8	SIN; Ret	JPN; 8	CHN; 14	BRA; 9			11th	21
2009	Red Bull Racing	Red Bull RB5	Renault RS27 2.4 V8	AUS; 12	MAL; 6^{‡}	CHN; 2	BHR; 11	ESP; 3	MON; 5	TUR; 2	GBR; 2	**GER**; 1	HUN; 3	EUR; 9	BEL; 9	ITA; Ret	SIN; Ret	JPN; 17	BRA; 1	ABU; 2				4th	69.5
2010	Red Bull Racing	Red Bull RB6	Renault RS27-2010 2.4 V8	BHR; 8	AUS; 9	**MAL**; 2	CHN; 8	**ESP**; 1	**MON**; 1	**TUR**; 3	CAN; 5	EUR; Ret	GBR; 1	GER; 6	HUN; 1	**BEL**; 2	ITA; 6	SIN; 3	JPN; 2	KOR; Ret	BRA; 2	ABU; 8		3rd	242
2011	Red Bull Racing	Red Bull RB7	Renault RS27-2011 2.4 V8	AUS; 5	MAL; 4	CHN; 3	TUR; 2	**ESP**; 4	MON; 4	CAN; 3	EUR; 3	**GBR**; 3	**GER**; 3	HUN; 5	BEL; 2	ITA; Ret	SIN; 3	JPN; 4	KOR; 3	IND; 4	ABU; 4	BRA; 1		3rd	258
2012	Red Bull Racing	Red Bull RB8	Renault RS27-2012 2.4 V8	AUS; 4	MAL; 4	CHN; 4	BHR; 4	ESP; 11	**MON**; 1	CAN; 7	EUR; 4	GBR; 1	GER; 8	HUN; 8	BEL; 6	ITA; 20^{†}	SIN; 11	JPN; 9	**KOR**; 2	IND; 3	ABU; Ret	USA; Ret	BRA; 4	6th	179
2013	Infiniti Red Bull Racing	Red Bull RB9	Renault RS27-2013 2.4 V8	AUS; 6	MAL; 2	CHN; Ret	BHR; 7	ESP; 5	MON; 3	CAN; 4	GBR; 2	GER; 7	HUN; 4	BEL; 5	ITA; 3	SIN; 15^{†}	KOR; Ret	**JPN**; 2	IND; Ret	**ABU**; 2	USA; 3	BRA; 2		3rd	199

^{‡} Half points awarded as less than 75% of race distance was completed by the winner.
^{†} Did not finish, but was classified as he had completed more than 90% of the race distance.

=== Complete FIA World Endurance Championship results ===
Year	Entrant	Class	Chassis	Engine	1	2	3	4	5	6	7	8	9	Rank	Points
2014	Porsche Team	LMP1	Porsche 919 Hybrid	Porsche 2.0 L Turbo V4 (Hybrid)	SIL; 3	SPA; 12	LMS; NC	COA; 5	FUJ; 3	SHA; 6	BHR; 3	**SÃO**; Ret		9th	64.5
2015	Porsche Team	LMP1	Porsche 919 Hybrid	Porsche 2.0 L Turbo V4 (Hybrid)	**SIL**; Ret	**SPA**; 3	LMS; 2	NÜR; 1	COA; 1	**FUJ**; 1	**SHA**; 1	**BHR**; 5		1st	166
2016	Porsche Team	LMP1	Porsche 919 Hybrid	Porsche 2.0 L Turbo V4 (Hybrid)	SIL; Ret	**SPA**; 26	LMS; 10	NÜR; 1	MEX; 1	COA; 1	FUJ; 3	**SHA**; 1	BHR; 3	4th	134.5

== Bibliography ==
- Jones, Bruce (2003). Formula One Grand Prix 2003: The Official ITV Sport Guide. London, England: Carlton Books. ISBN 1-84222-813-7 – via Open Library.
- Domenjoz, Luc, ed. (2003). Formula 1 Yearbook 2003–04. Bath, England: Parragon. ISBN 1-40542-089-8 – via Open Library.
- Domenjoz, Luc, ed. (2004). Formula 1 Yearbook 2004–05. Bath, England: Parragon. ISBN 2-84707-072-9 – via Open Library.
- Jones, Bruce (2006). Grand Prix 2006. London, England: Carlton Books. ISBN 978-1-84442-341-5 – via Open Library.
- Raby, Philip (2007). Grand Prix Driver by Driver. Swindon, Wiltshire: Green Umbrella Publishing. ISBN 978-1-905828-17-3 – via Open Library.
- Jones, Bruce (2008). Grand Prix 2008. London, England: Carlton Books. ISBN 978-1-84732-104-6 – via Open Library.
- Vigar, Simon (2008). Forza Minardi!: The Inside Story of the Little Team Which Took on the Giants of F1. Poundbury, England: Veloce Publishing. ISBN 978-1-84584-160-7 – via Google Books.
- Jones, Bruce (2010). Grand Prix 2010: The Official ITV Sport Guide. London, England: Carlton Books. ISBN 978-1-86200-703-1 – via Open Library.
- Morris, John (2010). Mark Webber: Two Steps Forward – A Formula One Pictorial History. Banksmeadow, NSW: Renniks Publications. ISBN 9780980524857.
- Jones, Bruce (2011). Grand Prix 2011: The Official ITV Sport Guide. London, England: Carlton Books. ISBN 978-1-84442-088-9 – via Open Library.
- Jones, Bruce (2015). The Story of Formula One: 65 Years of Life in the Fast Lane. London, England: Sevenoaks. ISBN 978-1-78177-270-6.
- Webber, Mark (2015). Aussie Grit: My Formula One Journey. London, England: Pan Macmillan Australia. ISBN 978-1-5098-1353-7 – via Open Library.

Sporting positions
Preceded by Kevin McGarrity	Formula Ford Festival; Winner; 1996	Succeeded by Jacky van der Ende
Preceded by Sébastien Buemi; Anthony Davidson	FIA World Endurance Champion; 2015; With: Timo Bernhard & Brendon Hartley	Succeeded by Romain Dumas; Marc Lieb; Neel Jani
Awards and achievements
Preceded by Juan Pablo Montoya	Autosport; Rookie of the Year; 2002	Succeeded by Dan Wheldon
Preceded by Fernando Alonso	Lorenzo Bandini Trophy; 2006	Succeeded by Felipe Massa
Preceded by Will Power; 2007	Sir Jack Brabham Award with Marcos Ambrose; 2009	Succeeded by Tony Gaze; 2011
Preceded by Jenson Button	Hawthorn Memorial Trophy; 2010	Succeeded by Jenson Button
Preceded by Fernando Alonso	DHL Fastest Lap Award; 2011	Succeeded by Sebastian Vettel
Preceded by Lewis Hamilton	Hawthorn Memorial Trophy; 2013	Succeeded by Lewis Hamilton
Preceded by Molly Taylor	Peter Brock Medal; 2016	Succeeded by Will Brown
