= FIA Hall of Fame =

List of autoracing drivers

The FIA Hall of Fame honours racing drivers. It was established by the Fédération Internationale de l'Automobile (FIA) in 2017. The first inductees were the 33 Formula One world champions, followed by the 17 World Rally champions and the 28 World Endurance champions in 2019.

== Inductees into the Hall of Fame ==
=== Inaugural class (2017) ===
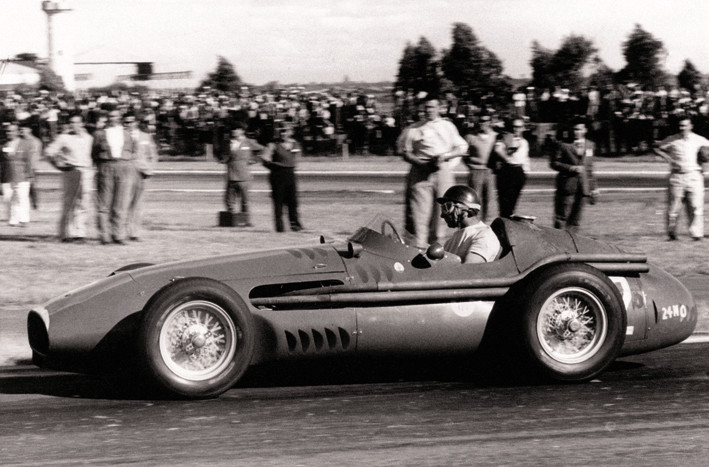
Juan Manuel Fangio driving a Maserati 250F

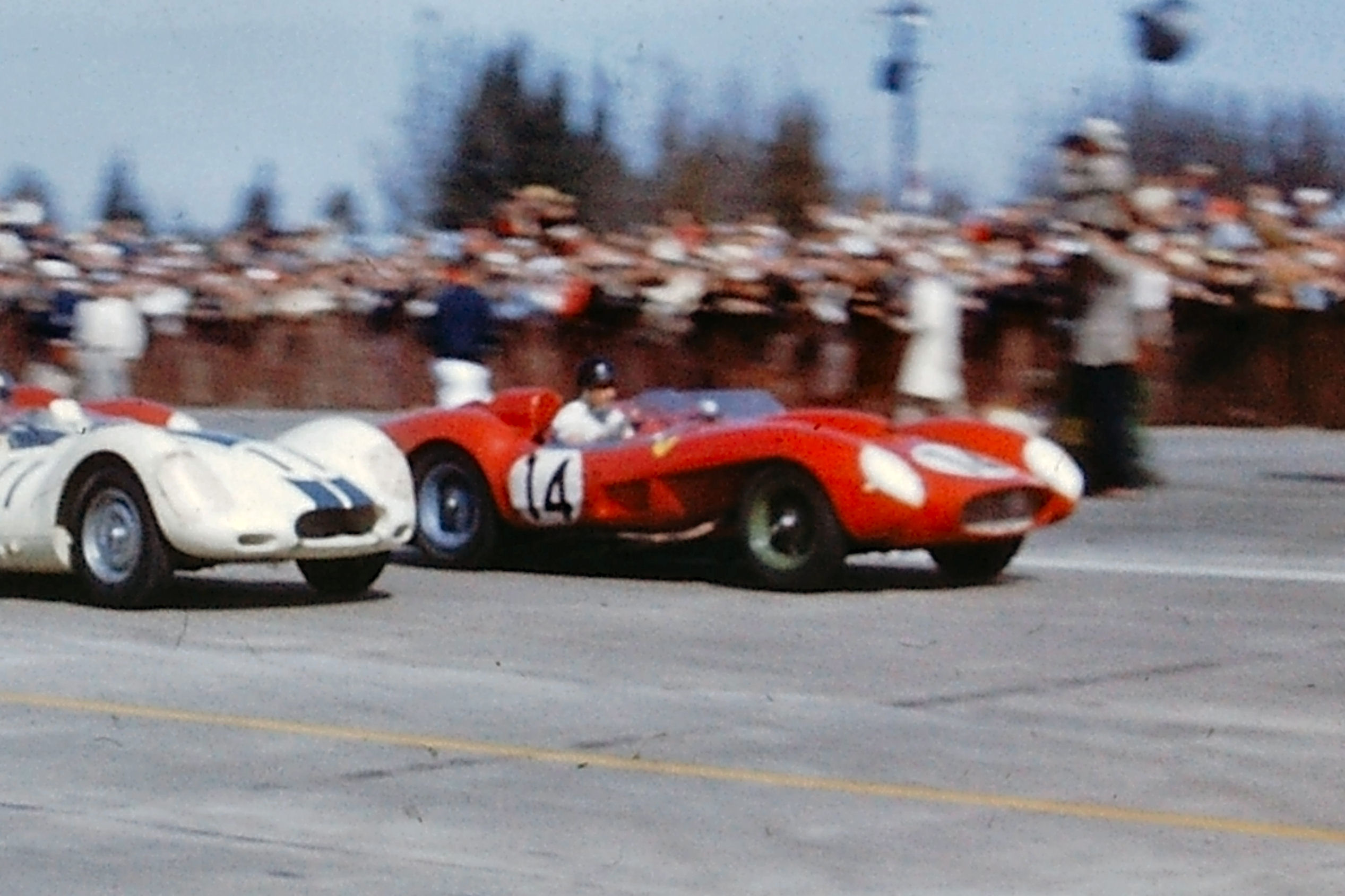
Phil Hill driving a Ferrari 250 TR at the 12 Hours of Sebring in 1958

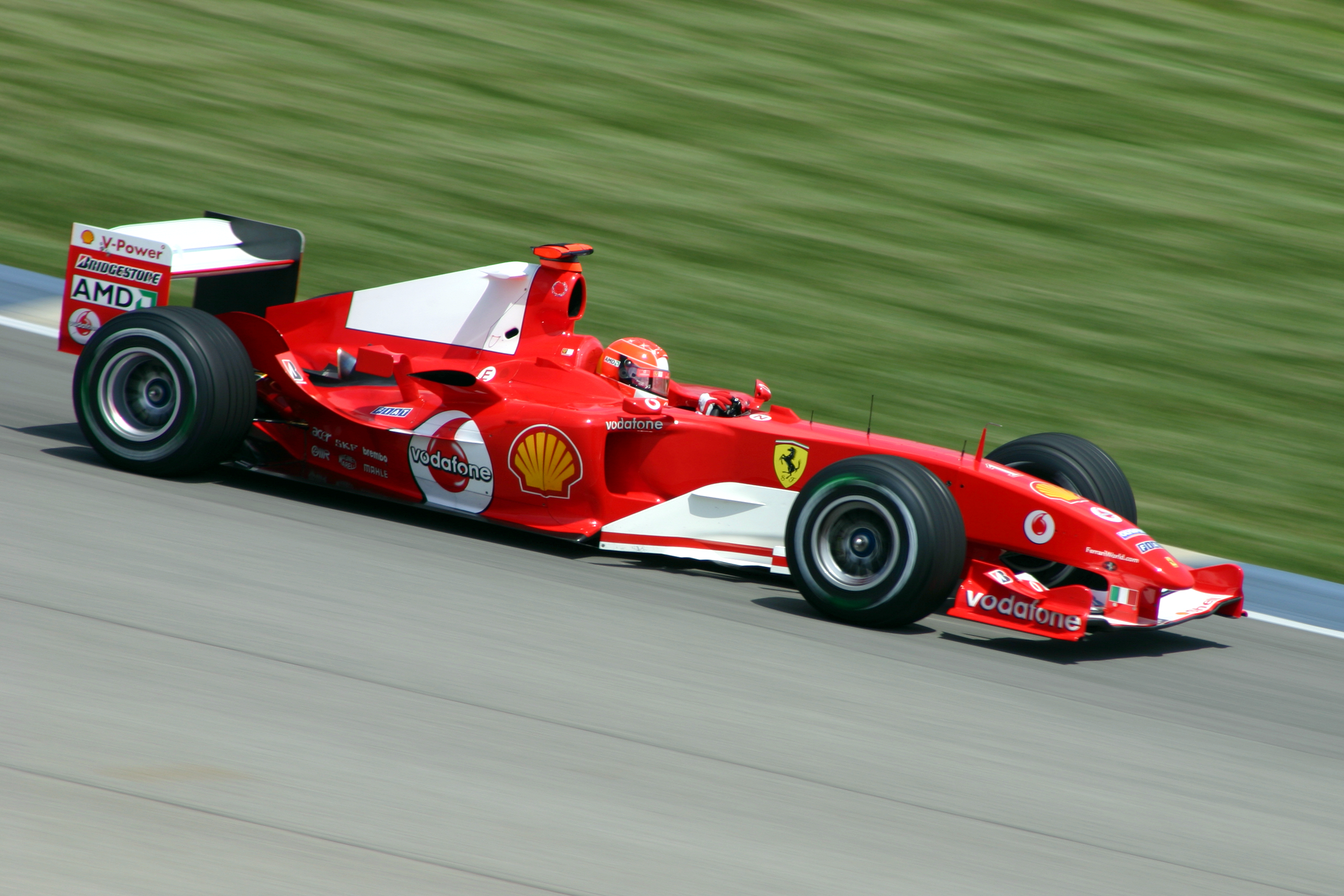
Michael Schumacher driving a Ferrari F2004 at Indianapolis in 2004, where he won the United States Grand Prix

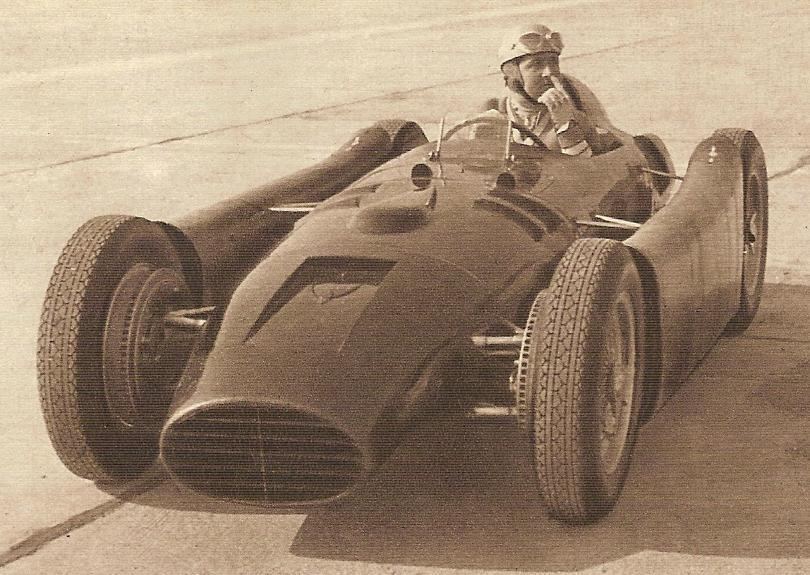
Alberto Ascari driving a Lancia D50 in 1954

Inductee	Nationality	Achievements
Giuseppe Farina	Italy	1950 Formula One World Champion
Mike Hawthorn	United Kingdom	1958 Formula One World Champion
Phil Hill	United States	1961 Formula One World Champion
John Surtees	United Kingdom	1964 Formula One World Champion
Denny Hulme	New Zealand	1967 Formula One World Champion
Jochen Rindt	Austria	1970 Formula One World Champion
James Hunt	United Kingdom	1976 Formula One World Champion
Mario Andretti	United States	1978 Formula One World Champion
Jody Scheckter	South Africa	1979 Formula One World Champion
Alan Jones	Australia	1980 Formula One World Champion
Keke Rosberg	Finland	1982 Formula One World Champion
Nigel Mansell	United Kingdom	1992 Formula One World Champion
Damon Hill	United Kingdom	1996 Formula One World Champion
Jacques Villeneuve	Canada	1997 Formula One World Champion
Kimi Räikkönen	Finland	2007 Formula One World Champion
Jenson Button	United Kingdom	2009 Formula One World Champion
Nico Rosberg	Germany	2016 Formula One World Champion
Alberto Ascari	Italy	2-time Formula One World Champion (1952, 1953)
Graham Hill	United Kingdom	2-time Formula One World Champion (1962, 1968)
Jim Clark	United Kingdom	2-time Formula One World Champion (1963, 1965)
Emerson Fittipaldi	Brazil	2-time Formula One World Champion (1972, 1974)
Mika Häkkinen	Finland	2-time Formula One World Champion (1998, 1999)
Fernando Alonso	Spain	2-time Formula One World Champion (2005, 2006), 2018–19 World Endurance Champion
Jack Brabham	Australia	3-time Formula One World Champion (1959, 1960, 1966)
Jackie Stewart	United Kingdom	3-time Formula One World Champion (1969, 1971, 1973)
Niki Lauda	Austria	3-time Formula One World Champion (1975, 1977, 1984)
Nelson Piquet	Brazil	3-time Formula One World Champion (1981, 1983, 1987)
Ayrton Senna	Brazil	3-time Formula One World Champion (1988, 1990, 1991)
Alain Prost	France	4-time Formula One World Champion (1985, 1986, 1989, 1993)
Sebastian Vettel	Germany	4-time Formula One World Champion (2010, 2011, 2012, 2013)
Juan Manuel Fangio	Argentina	5-time Formula One World Champion (1951, 1954, 1955, 1956, 1957)
Lewis Hamilton	United Kingdom	7-time Formula One World Champion (2008, 2014, 2015, 2017, 2018, 2019, 2020)
Michael Schumacher	Germany	7-time Formula One World Champion (1994, 1995, 2000, 2001, 2002, 2003, 2004)

=== Class of 2018 ===
Inductee	Nationality	Achievements
Björn Waldegård	Sweden	1979 World Rally Champion
Ari Vatanen	Finland	1981 World Rally Champion
Hannu Mikkola	Finland	1983 World Rally Champion
Stig Blomqvist	Sweden	1984 World Rally Champion
Timo Salonen	Finland	1985 World Rally Champion
Didier Auriol	France	1994 World Rally Champion
Colin McRae	United Kingdom	1995 World Rally Champion
Richard Burns	United Kingdom	2001 World Rally Champion
Petter Solberg	Norway	2003 World Rally Champion, 2-time World Rallycross Champion (2014, 2015)
Walter Röhrl	Germany	2-time World Rally Champion (1980, 1982)
Miki Biasion	Italy	2-time World Rally Champion (1988, 1989)
Carlos Sainz	Spain	2-time World Rally Champion (1990, 1992)
Marcus Grönholm	Finland	2-time World Rally Champion (2000, 2002)
Juha Kankkunen	Finland	4-time World Rally Champion (1986, 1987, 1991, 1993)
Tommi Mäkinen	Finland	4-time World Rally Champion (1996, 1997, 1998, 1999)
Sébastien Ogier	France	9-time World Rally Champion (2013, 2014, 2015, 2016, 2017, 2018, 2020, 2021, 2025)
Sébastien Loeb	France	9-time World Rally Champion (2004, 2005, 2006, 2007, 2008, 2009, 2010, 2011, 2012)

=== Class of 2019 ===
Inductee	Nationality	Achievements
Bob Garretson	United States	1981 World Endurance Champion
Stefan Bellof	Germany	1984 World Endurance Champion
Hans-Joachim Stuck	Germany	1985 World Endurance Champion
Raul Boesel	Brazil	1987 World Endurance Champion
Martin Brundle	United Kingdom	1988 World Endurance Champion
Mauro Baldi	Italy	1990 World Endurance Champion
Teo Fabi	Italy	1991 World Endurance Champion
Yannick Dalmas	France	1992 World Endurance Champion
Derek Warwick	United Kingdom	1992 World Endurance Champion
Marcel Fässler	Switzerland	2012 World Endurance Champion
André Lotterer	Germany	2012 World Endurance Champion
Benoît Tréluyer	France	2012 World Endurance Champion
Loïc Duval	France	2013 World Endurance Champion
Allan McNish	United Kingdom	2013 World Endurance Champion
Tom Kristensen	Denmark	2013 World Endurance Champion
Anthony Davidson	United Kingdom	2014 World Endurance Champion
Mark Webber	Australia	2015 World Endurance Champion
Romain Dumas	France	2016 World Endurance Champion
Neel Jani	Switzerland	2016 World Endurance Champion
Marc Lieb	Germany	2016 World Endurance Champion
Earl Bamber	New Zealand	2017 World Endurance Champion
Kazuki Nakajima	Japan	2018–19 World Endurance Champion
Jacky Ickx	Belgium	2-time World Endurance Champion (1982, 1983)
Derek Bell	United Kingdom	2-time World Endurance Champion (1985, 1986)
Jean-Louis Schlesser	France	2-time World Endurance Champion (1989, 1990)
Timo Bernhard	Germany	2-time World Endurance Champion (2015, 2017)
Brendon Hartley	New Zealand	4-time World Endurance Champion (2015, 2017, 2022, 2023)
Sébastien Buemi	Switzerland	4-time World Endurance Champion (2014, 2018–19, 2022, 2023)
