= 1997 Macau Grand Prix =

Formula Three motor race

Race details
Date	16 November 1997
Location	Guia Circuit, Macau
Course	Temporary street circuit 6.120 km (3.803 mi)
Distance	Leg 1; 15 laps, 73.44 km (45.63 mi); Leg 2; 15 laps, 73.44 km (45.63 mi)
- Leg 1

Pole
Driver	(France) Soheil Ayari	Graff Racing
Time	2:15.892

Fastest Lap
Driver	(France) Soheil Ayari	Graff Racing
Time	2:16.111

Podium
First	(France) Soheil Ayari	Graff Racing
Second	(France) Patrice Gay	Graff Racing
Third	(Portugal) André Couto	Prema Powerteam
- Leg 2
Driver	(France) Soheil Ayari	Graff Racing

Fastest Lap
Driver	(Netherlands) Tom Coronel	TOM'S
Time	2:15.950

Podium
First	(France) Soheil Ayari	Graff Racing
Second	(France) Patrice Gay	Graff Racing
Third	(Brazil) Enrique Bernoldi	Promatecme

The 1997 Macau Grand Prix Formula Three was the 44th Macau Grand Prix race to be held on the streets of Macau on 16 November 1997. It was the fourteenth edition for Formula Three cars. Although he crashed at 250 km/h (160 mph) on the ninth lap of the first leg which necessitated a rebuild of his car, Graff Racing driver Soheil Ayari won the two-leg aggregate event by 11.5 seconds over his teammate Patrice Gay in second position. Third place was taken by Enrique Bernoldi of the Promatecme team.

== Entry list ==
Team	No	Driver	Vehicle	Engine
(United Kingdom) San Miguel Paul Stewart Racing	1	(Republic of Ireland) Ralph Firman	Dallara 397	Mugen-Honda
(United Kingdom) San Miguel Paul Stewart Racing	2	(United Kingdom) Jonny Kane	Dallara 397	Mugen-Honda
(Germany) Bertram Schafer Racing	3	(Italy) Massimiliano Angelelli	Dallara 397	Opel
(Germany) Bertram Schafer Racing	5	(Belgium) Bas Leinders	Dallara 397	Opel
(Italy) RC Motorsport	6	(Italy) Oliver Martini	Dallara 397	Opel
(Italy) RC Motorsport	12	(Italy) Michele Gasparini	Dallara 396	Opel
(Japan) TOM'S	7	(Netherlands) Tom Coronel	Dallara 397	Toyota
(France) Gauloises Graff Racing	8	(France) Patrice Gay	Dallara 396	Opel
(France) Gauloises Graff Racing	9	(France) Soheil Ayari	Dallara 396	Opel
(France) Promatecme	15	(Brazil) Enrique Bernoldi	Dallara 397	Renault
(France) Promatecme	16	(France) Nicolas Minassian	Dallara 397	Renault
(France) LD Autosport	17	(France) Stéphane Sarrazin	Dallara 396	Fiat
(Japan) Toda Racing	18	(Japan) Yuji Tachikawa	Dallara 397	Mugen-Honda
(Italy) Prema Powerteam	19	(Portugal) André Couto	Dallara 397	Opel
(Italy) Prema Powerteam	20	(Netherlands) Donny Crevels	Dallara 396	Fiat
(Germany) Josef Kaufmann Racing	21	(Germany) Wolf Henzler	Martini MK73	Opel
(United Kingdom) Alan Docking Racing	22	(Australia) Mark Webber	Dallara 397	Mugen-Honda
(United Kingdom) Alan Docking Racing	23	(Brazil) Ricardo Maurício	Dallara 397	Mugen-Honda
(France) ASM Formule 3	25	(Belgium) David Saelens	Dallara 396	Opel
(Italy) EF Project	26	(Italy) Maurizio Mediani	Dallara 397	Fiat
(Japan) Tomei Sport	27	(Argentina) Sebastián Martino	Dallara 397	Opel
(Japan) Tomei Sport	28	(Japan) Keiichi Nishimiya	Dallara 396	Opel
(Germany) GM Motorsport	29	(United Kingdom) Peter Dumbreck	Dallara 397	Opel
(Germany) GM Motorsport	30	(Germany) Norman Simon	Dallara 397	Opel
(France) La Filiere	31	(France) Franck Montagny	Martini MK73	Opel
(France) La Filiere	32	(Spain) Oriol Servià	Martini MK73	Opel
(United Kingdom) Martin Donnelly Racing	33	(Brazil) Mário Haberfeld	Dallara 397	Opel
(United Kingdom) Fortec Motorsports	35	(United Kingdom) Ben Collins	Dallara 397	Mitsubishi
(United Kingdom) Fortec Motorsports	36	(Sweden) Fredrik Ekblom	Dallara 397	Mitsubishi
