= Patrice Gay =

French former racing driver from Bourges (born 1973)

- Born: Patrice Aimé Joseph Gay; 14 November 1973 (age 52); Bourges, France
- Occupation: Racing Driver

Patrice Aimé Joseph Gay (born 14 November 1973) is a French former racing driver from Bourges.

Gay began racing in French Formula Three in 1996, capturing one win and finishing third in points. He returned to the series the following year and won the championship with 3 wins and 9 podiums in 17 races. He also was the runner up in the Macau Grand Prix. He drove for Courage Compétition in the 1998 24 Hours of Le Mans but the car failed to finish. He returned to the race in 1999 and finished in 9th on an all-French Pescarolo Sport team. He returned to open wheel racing in 2000 when he drove in the World Series by Nissan for Campos Motorsport and finished fifth with two wins.

== Awards and achievements ==
- 1997 French Formula 3 Championship: Champion with three wins and nine podiums.
- 1997 Macau Grand Prix: Runner-up.
- 2000 World Series by Nissan: Fifth overall with two victories.
- 1999 24 Hours of Le Mans: Ninth overall driving for Pescarolo Sport.
