= December 2012 Gulf 12 Hours =

2nd Gulf 12 Hours endurance race

The layout of Yas Marina Circuit

The December 2012 Gulf 12 Hours was the second edition of the Gulf 12 Hours held at Yas Marina Circuit on 14 December 2012. It was organized by Driving Force Events Ltd. and contested with GT3-spec, GT4-spec, Porsche Cup and Group CN cars.

The race was won by Gaetano Ardagna, Gianmaria Bruni and Toni Vilander in the #1 AF Corse 1 Ferrari 458 Italia GT3.

== Race Results ==
=== Part 1 ===
Class winners denoted in bold.

Pos.	Class	No.	Team	Drivers	Car	Laps	Time/Gap
1	**GT3**	**3**	**(Switzerland) Kessel Racing**	**(Poland) Michał Broniszewski** **(Austria) Philipp Peter** **(Italy) Daniel Zampieri**	**Ferrari 458 Italia GT3**	**155**	**6:00:49.117**
2	GT3	1	(Italy) AF Corse 1	(Venezuela) Gaetano Ardagna (Italy) Gianmaria Bruni (Finland) Toni Vilander	Ferrari 458 Italia GT3	155	+37.657
3	GT3	11	(Italy) AF Waltrip 2	(Venezuela) Alex Popow (Scotland) Ryan Dalziel (Germany) Pierre Kaffer	Ferrari 458 Italia GT3	155	+43.665
4	GT3	2	(Italy) AF Corse 2	(France) Stephane Sarrazin (France) Nicolas Minassian (Venezuela) Enzo Potolicchio	Ferrari 458 Italia GT3	155	+1:38.600
5	GT3	6	(Italy) Autorlando	(Netherlands) Sebastiaan Bleekemolen (Venezuela) Emilio Di Guida (Netherlands) Jeroen Bleekemolen	Porsche 997 GT3-R	154	+1 Lap
6	GT3	10	(Italy) AF Waltrip 1	(Australia) Stephen Wyatt (Italy) Maurizio Mediani (Italy) Michele Rugolo	Ferrari 458 Italia GT3	154	+1 Lap
7	**SC**	**45**	**(Italy) Avelon Formula 1**	**(United Kingdom) Alessandro Latif** **(United Arab Emirates) Juma Ali Al Dhaeri** **(Italy) Ivan Bellarosa**	**Wolf GB08**	**153**	**+2 Laps**
8	GT3	8	(Germany) MRS Molitor	(Venezuela) Justino de Azcarate Riveroll (Venezuela) Fernando Baiz (Austria) Philipp Eng	McLaren MP4-12C GT3	152	+3 Laps
9	GT3	15	(Italy) AT Racing 2	(Netherlands) Martin Lanting (Netherlands) Niek Hommerson (Belgium) Louis Machiels	Ferrari 458 Italia GT3	151	+4 Laps
10	GT3	9	(Germany) Black Falcon	(Republic of Ireland) Sean Patrick Breslin (Tanzania) Vimal Mehta (United Arab Emirates) Khaled Al Qubaisi	Mercedes-Benz SLS AMG GT3	150	+5 Laps
11	GT3	4	(Switzerland) Kessel Racing 2	(Switzerland) Tiziano Carugati (Italy) Mario Cordoni (Switzerland) Mathias Beche	Ferrari 458 Italia GT3	150	+5 Laps
12	GT3	14	(Italy) AT Racing 2	(United States) Howard Blank-Jean (France) Marc Bachelier (France) Yannick Mallegol	Ferrari 458 Italia GT3	149	+6 Laps
13	GT3	12	(Switzerland) Kessel Chicco d'oro	(Switzerland) Kola Aluko (Italy) Thomas Kemenater (Italy) Niki Cadei	Ferrari 458 Italia GT3	147	+8 Laps
14	**GTX**	**23**	**(Italy) Ebimotors**	**(Italy) Matteo Beretta** **(Italy) Giacomo Scanzi** **(Italy) Roberto Silva** **(Italy) Nicola Benucci**	**Porsche 911 GT3 Cup**	**144**	**+11 Laps**
15	GTX	25	(Italy) Nova Race	(Italy) Roberto Rayneri (Italy) Luca Magnoni (Italy) Luis Scarpaccio (Italy) Matteo Cressoni	Ginetta G50 GT4	138	+17 Laps
16	GTX	22	(United Arab Emirates) Yas Marina Circuit	(United Arab Emirates) Saeed Al Mehairi (United Arab Emirates) Abbas Al Alawi (United Arab Emirates) Hasher Al Maktoum	Aston Martin Vantage GT4	137	+18 Laps
17 DNF	GTX	21	(United Kingdom) Barwell Motorsport	(United Kingdom) Mark Lemmer (Denmark) Jan Andersen (United Kingdom) Geoff Kimber-Smith (United Kingdom) Tom Kimber-Smith	Aston Martin Vantage GT4	129	+26 Laps
18	GT3	5	(United Kingdom) United Autosports	(South Africa) Mark Patterson (United Kingdom) Will Bratt (United Kingdom) Matt Bell	Audi R8 LMS	116	+39 Laps
19	GTX	20	(United Arab Emirates) Gulf Racing MIddle East	(Australia) John Iossifidis (France) Frederic Fatien (Australia) Martin Baerschmidt (United Kingdom) Nigel Farmer	Aston Martin Vantage GT4	114	+41 Laps
20	GT3	47	(Portugal) ASM Team	(Portugal) Álvaro Parente (United Kingdom) Rob Bell (Saudi Arabia) Karim Ojjeh	McLaren MP4-12C GT3	97	+58 Laps
21 DNF	SC	46	(Italy) Avelon Formula 2	(Italy) Maurizio Pitorri (Italy) Tony Mastroberardino (Italy) Guglielmo Belotti	Wolf GB08	62	+93 Laps

=== Part 2 ===
Class winners denoted in bold.

Pos.	Class	No.	Team	Drivers	Car	Laps	Time/Gap
1	**GT3**	**1**	**(Italy) AF Corse 1**	**(Venezuela) Gaetano Ardagna** **(Italy) Gianmaria Bruni** **(Finland) Toni Vilander**	**Ferrari 458 Italia GT3**	**311**	**13:34:09.985**
2	GT3	11	(Italy) AF Waltrip 2	(Venezuela) Alex Popow (Scotland) Ryan Dalziel (Germany) Pierre Kaffer	Ferrari 458 Italia GT3	311	+6.496
3	GT3	6	(Italy) Autorlando	(Netherlands) Sebastiaan Bleekemolen (Venezuela) Emilio Di Guida (Netherlands) Jeroen Bleekemolen	Porsche 997 GT3-R	311	+1:23.155
4	GT3	10	(Italy) AF Waltrip 1	(Australia) Stephen Wyatt (Italy) Maurizio Mediani (Italy) Michele Rugolo	Ferrari 458 Italia GT3	309	+2 Laps
5	GT3	3	(Switzerland) Kessel Racing	(Poland) Michał Broniszewski (Austria) Philipp Peter (Italy) Daniel Zampieri	Ferrari 458 Italia GT3	307	+4 Laps
6	**SC**	**45**	**(Italy) Avelon Formula 1**	**(United Kingdom) Alessandro Latif** **(United Arab Emirates) Juma Ali Al Dhaeri** **(Italy) Ivan Bellarosa**	**Wolf GB08**	**307**	**+4 Laps**
7	GT3	2	(Italy) AF Corse 2	(France) Stephane Sarrazin (France) Nicolas Minassian (Venezuela) Enzo Potolicchio	Ferrari 458 Italia GT3	302	+9 Laps
8	GT3	12	(Switzerland) Kessel Chicco d'oro	(Switzerland) Kola Aluko (Italy) Thomas Kemenater (Italy) Niki Cadei	Ferrari 458 Italia GT3	301	+10 Laps
9	GT3	9	(Germany) Black Falcon	(Republic of Ireland) Sean Patrick Breslin (Tanzania) Vimal Mehta (United Arab Emirates) Khaled Al Qubaisi	Mercedes-Benz SLS AMG GT3	300	+11 Laps
10	GT3	15	(Italy) AT Racing 2	(Netherlands) Martin Lanting (Netherlands) Niek Hommerson (Belgium) Louis Machiels	Ferrari 458 Italia GT3	297	+14 Laps
11	GT3	14	(Italy) AT Racing 2	(United States) Howard Blank-Jean (France) Marc Bachelier (France) Yannick Mallegol	Ferrari 458 Italia GT3	292	+19 Laps
12	**GTX**	**25**	**(Italy) Nova Race**	**(Italy) Roberto Rayneri** **(Italy) Luca Magnoni** **(Italy) Luis Scarpaccio** **(Italy) Matteo Cressoni**	**Ginetta G50 GT4**	**278**	**+33 Laps**
13	GT3	4	(Switzerland) Kessel Racing 2	(Switzerland) Tiziano Carugati (Italy) Mario Cordoni (Switzerland) Mathias Beche	Ferrari 458 Italia GT3	276	+35 Laps
14	GTX	22	(United Arab Emirates) Yas Marina Circuit	(United Arab Emirates) Saeed Al Mehairi (United Arab Emirates) Abbas Al Alawi (United Arab Emirates) Hasher Al Maktoum	Aston Martin Vantage GT4	275	+36 Laps
15	GTX	21	(United Kingdom) Barwell Motorsport	(United Kingdom) Mark Lemmer (Denmark) Jan Andersen (United Kingdom) Geoff Kimber-Smith (United Kingdom) Tom Kimber-Smith	Aston Martin Vantage GT4	270	+41 Laps
16	GTX	23	(Italy) Ebimotors	(Italy) Matteo Beretta (Italy) Giacomo Scanzi (Italy) Roberto Silva (Italy) Nicola Benucci	Porsche 911 GT3 Cup	263	+48 Laps
17	GT3	5	(United Kingdom) United Autosports	(South Africa) Mark Patterson (United Kingdom) Will Bratt (United Kingdom) Matt Bell	Audi R8 LMS	243	+68 Laps
18	GT3	47	(Portugal) ASM Team	(Portugal) Álvaro Parente (United Kingdom) Rob Bell (Saudi Arabia) Karim Ojjeh	McLaren MP4-12C GT3	241	+70 Laps
19	GTX	20	(United Arab Emirates) Gulf Racing MIddle East	(Australia) John Iossifidis (France) Frederic Fatien (Australia) Martin Baerschmidt (United Kingdom) Nigel Farmer	Aston Martin Vantage GT4	234	+77 Laps
20 DNF	GT3	8	(Germany) MRS Molitor	(Venezuela) Justino de Azcarate Riveroll (Venezuela) Fernando Baiz (Austria) Philipp Eng	McLaren MP4-12C GT3	231	+80 Laps
21 DNF	SC	46	(Italy) Avelon Formula 2	(Italy) Maurizio Pitorri (Italy) Tony Mastroberardino (Italy) Guglielmo Belotti	Wolf GB08	63	+248 Laps
