= 1996 British Formula Three Championship =

1996 British Formula 3 International Series

Seasons
- ← 1995 1997 →

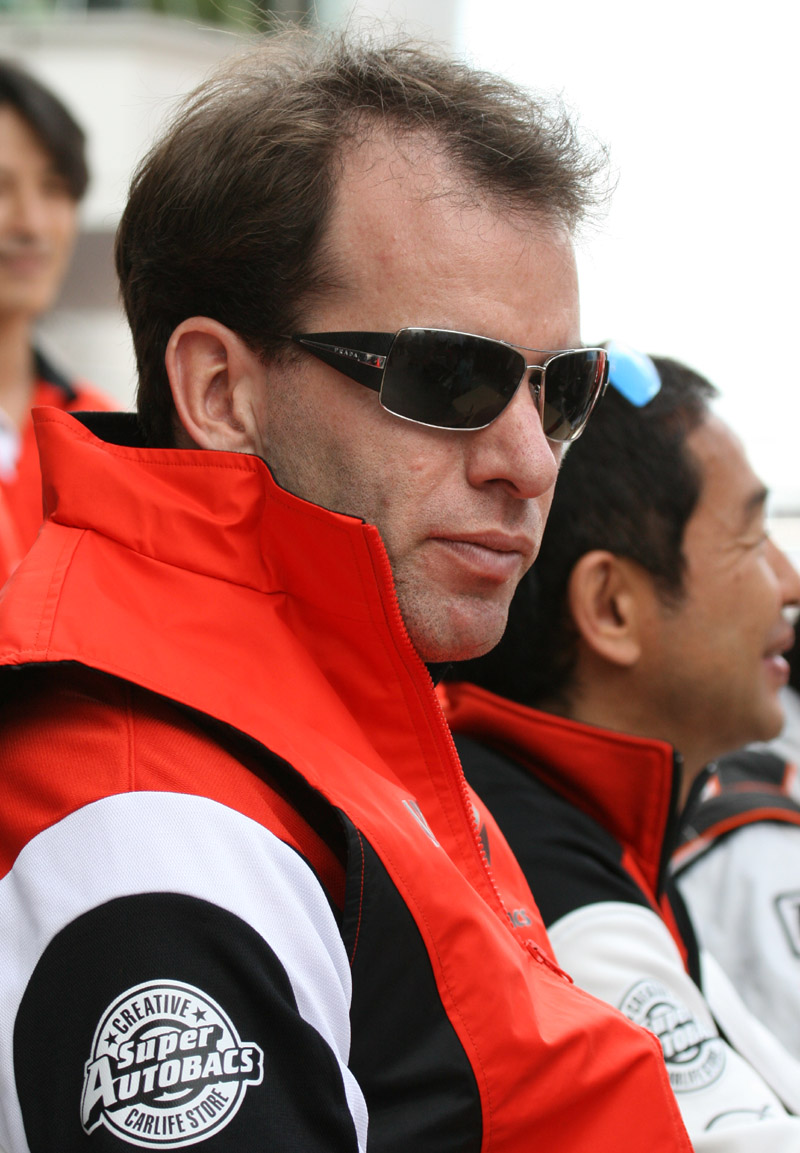
1996 champion, Ralph Firman

The 1996 British Formula Three season was the 46th British Formula Three Championship. The season started on 31 March at Silverstone and ended there on 13 October following sixteen races. After losing out in the final reckoning to Oliver Gavin in 1995, Ralph Firman was able to clinch the crown on his second attempt from Kurt Mollekens and teammate Jonny Kane. New Zealander Simon Wills took the Class B title.

This season did not feature any Brazilian drivers, an unusual fact for British Formula 3 since the arrival of Emerson Fittipaldi in 1969.

The scoring system was 20-15-12-10-8-6-4-3-2-1 points awarded to the first ten finishers, with 1 (one) extra point added to the driver who set the fastest lap of the race. All results counted towards the driver's final tally.

== Drivers and Teams ==
Team	No	Driver	Chassis	Engine	Rounds
Class A
(United Kingdom) Paul Stewart Racing	1	(United Kingdom) Ralph Firman	Dallara F396	Mugen-Honda	All
(United Kingdom) Paul Stewart Racing	2	(United Kingdom) Jonny Kane	Dallara F396	Mugen-Honda	All
(United Kingdom) Fortec Motorsport	3	(United Kingdom) Guy Smith	Dallara F396	HKS-Mitsubishi	All
(United Kingdom) Fortec Motorsport	4	(Colombia) Juan Pablo Montoya	Dallara F396	HKS-Mitsubishi	All
(France) Promatecme	5	(United Kingdom) James Matthews	Dallara F396	Renault	All
(France) Promatecme	6	(France) Nicolas Minassian	Dallara F396	Renault	All
(United Kingdom) Alan Docking Racing	7	(United States) Brian Cunningham	Dallara F396	Mugen-Honda	All
(United Kingdom) Alan Docking Racing	8	(Uruguay) Gonzalo Rodríguez	Dallara F396	Mugen-Honda	1-4
(United Kingdom) Alan Docking Racing	8	(India) Akbar Ebrahim	Dallara F396	Mugen-Honda	8
(United Kingdom) Alan Docking Racing	8	(United Kingdom) Steven Arnold	Dallara F396	Mugen-Honda	9
(United Kingdom) Alan Docking Racing	11	(Belgium) Kurt Mollekens	Dallara F396	Mugen-Honda	All
(United Kingdom) Alan Docking Racing	12	(Finland) Risto Virtanen	Dallara F396	Mugen-Honda	1-4
(United Kingdom) TWR Junior Team	9	(United Kingdom) Jamie Davies	Dallara F396	TWR GM	All
(United Kingdom) TWR Junior Team	10	(United Kingdom) Mark Shaw	Dallara F396	TWR GM	All
(United Kingdom) Intersport	14	(Spain) Ángel Burgueño	Dallara F396	Opel	All
(United Kingdom) SpeedSport F3	15	(United Kingdom) Darren Manning	Dallara F396	Mugen-Honda	All
(United Kingdom) TOM'S GB	16	(United Kingdom) Christian Horner	TOM'S 036	TOM'S-Toyota	1-6
(United Kingdom) TOM'S GB	16	(Japan) Naoki Kurose	Dallara F396	TOM'S-Toyota	16
(United Kingdom) TOM'S GB	17	(Argentina) Brian Smith	TOM'S 036	TOM'S-Toyota	All
(United Kingdom) TOM'S GB	18	(Japan) Takashi Yokoyama	Dallara F396	TOM'S-Toyota	1-3
(United Kingdom) TOM'S GB	18	(Japan) Takashi Yokoyama	TOM'S 036	TOM'S-Toyota	4-16
(United Kingdom) TOM'S GB	19	(Japan) Kazuto Yanagawa	Dallara F396	TOM'S-Toyota	All
(United Kingdom) DC Cook Motorsport	20	(United Kingdom) Paula Cook	Dallara F396	Mugen-Honda	1-11
(France) Graff Racing	23	(France) Boris Derichebourg	Dallara F396	Opel	11
(France) Graff Racing	23	(France) Patrice Gay	Dallara F396	Opel	14-15
(United Kingdom) Z-Speed	27	(United Kingdom) Martin Byford	Dallara F396	Opel	1–9, 11-15
Class B
(United Kingdom) Z-Speed	31	(New Zealand) Simon Wills	Dallara F394	Vauxhall	All
(United Kingdom) Hopkins Motorsport	33	(United Kingdom) Philip Hopkins	Dallara F393	Fiat	1–6, 8–9, 11–13, 16
(United Kingdom) Hopkins Motorsport	33	(United States) James Carney	Dallara F393	Fiat	14-15
(United Kingdom) Render Racing	34	(United Kingdom) Martin O'Connell	Dallara F394	Vauxhall	1–3, 7–9, 12-13
(United Kingdom) Render Racing	34	(Japan) Masami Nakamura	Dallara F394	Vauxhall	14-16
(United Kingdom) SpeedSport F3	35	(United Kingdom) Michael Bentwood	Dallara F394	Vauxhall	All
(United Kingdom) Team Magic Racing	36	(Japan) Shingo Tachi	Dallara F394	TOM'S-Toyota	All
(United Kingdom) Team Magic Racing	37	(United Kingdom) Ben Collins	Dallara F394	Mugen-Honda	7-16
(United Kingdom) Mark Bailey Racing	47	(United States) Tavo Hellmund	Dallara F394	TOM'S-Toyota	1-7
(United Kingdom) Mark Bailey Racing	48	(United Kingdom) Chris Clark	Dallara F394	TOM'S-Toyota	1-4

== Race calendar and results ==
Round	Circuit	Date	Pole position	Fastest lap	Winning driver	Winning team	Class B winner
1	(United Kingdom) Silverstone	31 March	(United Kingdom) Guy Smith	(United Kingdom) Ralph Firman	(United Kingdom) Guy Smith	(United Kingdom) Fortec Motorsport	(United Kingdom) Martin O'Connell
2	(United Kingdom) Silverstone	31 March	(United Kingdom) Guy Smith	(United Kingdom) Jamie Davies	(United Kingdom) Jamie Davies	(United Kingdom) TWR Junior Team	(United Kingdom) Martin O'Connell
3	(United Kingdom) Thruxton	14 April	(United Kingdom) Ralph Firman	(United Kingdom) Ralph Firman	(United Kingdom) Jamie Davies	(United Kingdom) TWR Junior Team	(New Zealand) Simon Wills
4	(United Kingdom) Donington Park	5 May	(United Kingdom) Ralph Firman	(Colombia) Juan Pablo Montoya	(Colombia) Juan Pablo Montoya	(United Kingdom) Fortec Motorsport	(Japan) Shingo Tachi
5	(United Kingdom) Brands Hatch	27 May	(United Kingdom) Ralph Firman	(United Kingdom) Ralph Firman	(United Kingdom) Ralph Firman	(United Kingdom) Paul Stewart Racing	(New Zealand) Simon Wills
6	(United Kingdom) Brands Hatch	27 May	(United Kingdom) Ralph Firman	(United Kingdom) Ralph Firman	(United Kingdom) Ralph Firman	(United Kingdom) Paul Stewart Racing	(United Kingdom) Philip Hopkins
7	(United Kingdom) Oulton Park	8 June	(United Kingdom) Jonny Kane	(Colombia) Juan Pablo Montoya	(United Kingdom) Ralph Firman	(United Kingdom) Paul Stewart Racing	(United Kingdom) Martin O'Connell
8	(United Kingdom) Donington Park	23 June	(Argentina) Brian Smith	(Colombia) Juan Pablo Montoya	(Belgium) Kurt Mollekens	(United Kingdom) Alan Docking Racing	(United Kingdom) Martin O'Connell
9	(United Kingdom) Silverstone	13 July	(United Kingdom) Darren Manning	(United Kingdom) Jonny Kane	(United Kingdom) Darren Manning	(United Kingdom) SpeedSport F3	(United Kingdom) Martin O'Connell
10	(United Kingdom) Thruxton	28 July	(United Kingdom) Darren Manning	(Colombia) Juan Pablo Montoya	(Colombia) Juan Pablo Montoya	(United Kingdom) Fortec Motorsport	(United Kingdom) Ben Collins
11^{1}	(United Kingdom) Snetterton	11 August	(United Kingdom) Jonny Kane	(United Kingdom) Jonny Kane	(United Kingdom) Jonny Kane	(United Kingdom) Paul Stewart Racing	(United Kingdom) Ben Collins
12	(United Kingdom) Pembrey	1 September	(United Kingdom) Jonny Kane	(United Kingdom) Jonny Kane	(France) Nicolas Minassian	(France) Promatecme	(United Kingdom) Ben Collins
13	(United Kingdom) Pembrey	1 September	(United Kingdom) Jonny Kane	(United Kingdom) Jonny Kane	(United Kingdom) Jonny Kane	(United Kingdom) Paul Stewart Racing	(Japan) Shingo Tachi
14	(Netherlands) Zandvoort	29 September	(Colombia) Juan Pablo Montoya	(Belgium) Kurt Mollekens	(Belgium) Kurt Mollekens	(United Kingdom) Alan Docking Racing	(United Kingdom) Ben Collins
15	(Netherlands) Zandvoort	29 September	(Argentina) Brian Smith	(United Kingdom) Ralph Firman	(United Kingdom) Jonny Kane	(United Kingdom) Paul Stewart Racing	(United Kingdom) Ben Collins
16	(United Kingdom) Silverstone	13 October	(France) Nicolas Minassian	(France) Nicolas Minassian	(France) Nicolas Minassian	(France) Promatecme	(New Zealand) Simon Wills

^1 Round 11 was shortened due to heavy rain, and a planned second race at Snetterton was also cancelled.

== Drivers Championship ==
Pos	Driver	SIL (United Kingdom)	SIL (United Kingdom)	THR (United Kingdom)	DON (United Kingdom)	BRH (United Kingdom)	BRH (United Kingdom)	OUL (United Kingdom)	DON (United Kingdom)	SIL (United Kingdom)	THR (United Kingdom)	SNE (United Kingdom)	PEM (United Kingdom)	PEM (United Kingdom)	ZAN (Netherlands)	ZAN (Netherlands)	SIL (United Kingdom)	Pts
Class A
1	(United Kingdom) Ralph Firman	4	2	3	Ret	1	1	1	2	2	2	6	13	5	5	4	4	188
2	(Belgium) Kurt Mollekens	5	5	11	3	6	7	2	1	4	5	9	3	8	1	2	7	148
3	(United Kingdom) Jonny Kane	Ret	6	5	Ret	4	Ret	10	Ret	3	Ret	1	2	1	2	1	2	146
4	(France) Nicolas Minassian	9	8	7	5	2	3	3	3	9	Ret	17	1	7	3	3	1	139
5	(Colombia) Juan Pablo Montoya	2	12	4	1	12	2	9	13	7	1	3	4	6	4	Ret	5	137
6	(United Kingdom) Guy Smith	1	3	6	4	3	6	5	4	6	9	2	12	12	8	5	3	132
7	(United Kingdom) Darren Manning	7	10	17	2	5	8	6	6	1	4	5	7	4	12	7	6	105
8	(United Kingdom) Jamie Davies	3	1	1	Ret	10	10	4	20	11	6	7	5	2	Ret	Ret	DNS	98
9	(United Kingdom) James Matthews	6	4	2	9	20	11	8	19	10	7	4	8	9	Ret	8	12	59
10	(Argentina) Brian Smith	Ret	DNS	25	Ret	8	5	7	12	8	DNS	8	6	3	7	Ret	DSQ	44
11	(United States) Brian Cunningham	Ret	13	9	Ret	7	Ret	WD	5	5	8	11	9	14	6	Ret	10	34
12	(Spain) Ángel Burgueño	Ret	DNS	10	Ret	13	4	11	7	Ret	3	Ret	15	16	Ret	11	8	31
13	(United Kingdom) Mark Shaw	14	7	8	13	Ret	Ret	18	9	13	Ret	19†	Ret	18	10	Ret	DSQ	12
14	(Uruguay) Gonzalo Rodríguez	8	Ret	12	6													9
15	(France) Patrice Gay														9	6		8
16	(Japan) Takashi Yokoyama	13	9	20	8	11	Ret	19	17	Ret	14†	10	18	21	11	Ret	9	8
17	(United Kingdom) Martin Byford	11	11	Ret	Ret	9	9	14	11	Ret		12	Ret	DNS	15†	12		7
18	(Finland) Risto Virtanen	21	21	14	7													4
19	(Japan) Kazuto Yanagawa	16	18	19	Ret	17	Ret	Ret	14	16	13	13	Ret	13	Ret	9	15	3
20	(United Kingdom) Christian Horner	Ret	24	16	Ret	16	13											0
21	(United Kingdom) Paula Cook	17	16	21	Ret	18	14	DNS	DNS	20	DNS	DNS						0
22	(France) Boris Derichebourg											14						0
23	(United Kingdom) Steven Arnold									15								0
24	(India) Akbar Ebrahim								18									0
	(Japan) Naoki Kurose																Ret	
Class B
1	(New Zealand) Simon Wills	19	17	13	14	14	15	15	15	21	11	16	16	17	Ret	13	11	201
2	(Japan) Shingo Tachi	15	19	23	10	15	17	13	21	14	Ret	DNS	11	10	14	Ret	13	192
3	(United Kingdom) Ben Collins							Ret	10	17	10	15	10	11	13	10	Ret	147
4	(United Kingdom) Martin O'Connell	10	14	18				12	8	12			17	19				131
5	(United Kingdom) Michael Bentwood	20	22	DNS	11	Ret	16	16	16	18	12	18†	14	15	Ret	Ret	14	119
6	(United States) Tavo Hellmund	18	20	24	12	19	Ret	17										56
7	(United Kingdom) Philip Hopkins	22†	23	22	Ret	Ret	12		Ret	19		20†	19†	20			DSQ	52
8	(United Kingdom) Chris Clark	12	15	15	Ret													45
9	(Japan) Masami Nakamura														17	Ret	16	20
10	(United States) James Carney														16	Ret		12
Pos	Driver	SIL (United Kingdom)	SIL (United Kingdom)	THR (United Kingdom)	DON (United Kingdom)	BRH (United Kingdom)	BRH (United Kingdom)	OUL (United Kingdom)	DON (United Kingdom)	SIL (United Kingdom)	THR (United Kingdom)	SNE (United Kingdom)	PEM (United Kingdom)	PEM (United Kingdom)	ZAN (Netherlands)	ZAN (Netherlands)	SIL (United Kingdom)	Pts
