= 1997 British Formula Three Championship =

1997 British Formula 3 International Series

Seasons
- ← 1996 1998 →

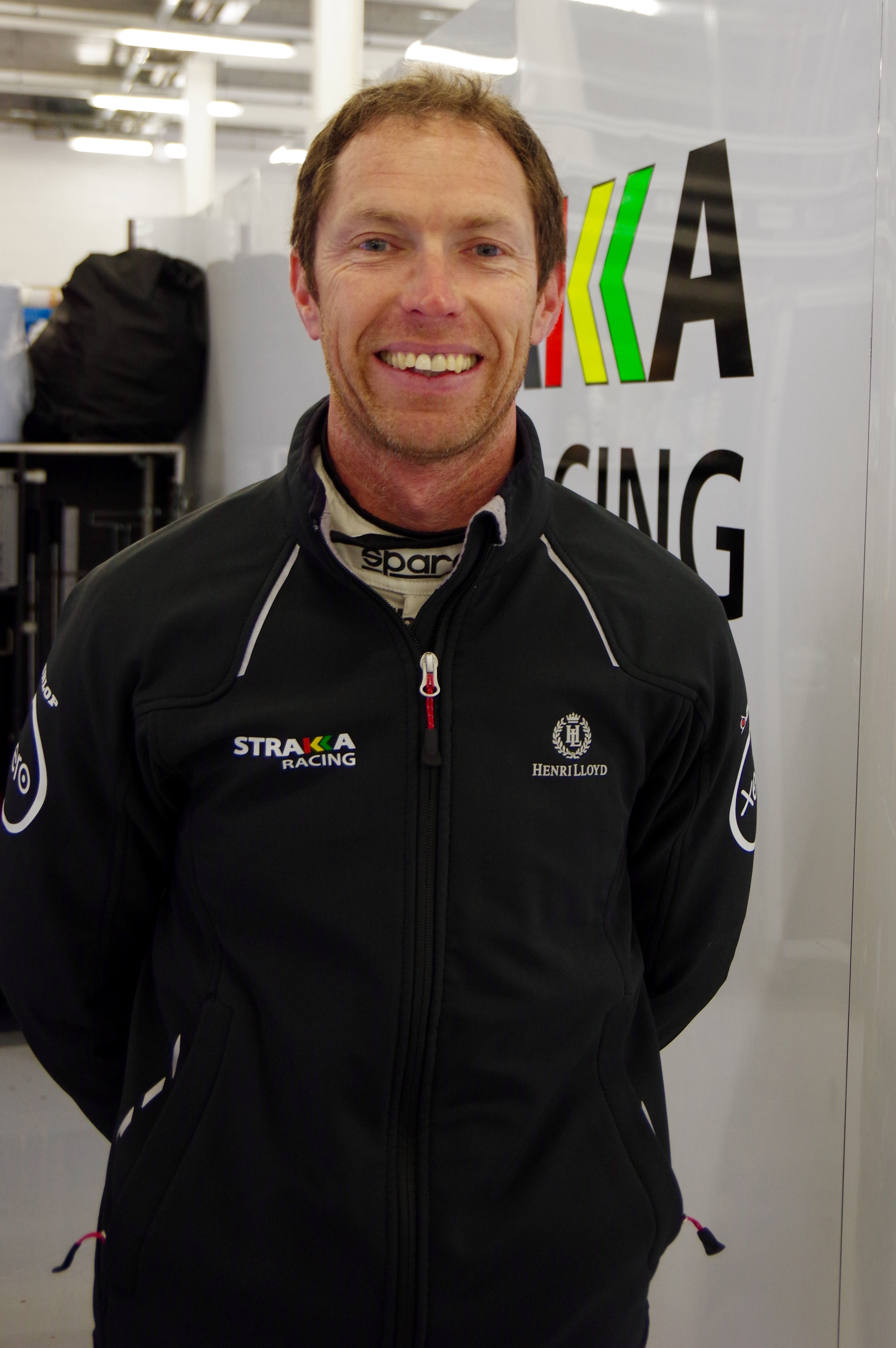
1997 champion, Jonny Kane

The 1997 British Formula Three season was the 47th British Formula Three Championship, won by Jonny Kane. The season started on 23 March at Donington Park and ended at Thruxton on 12 October following sixteen races. Kane built on a strong finish to his 1996 campaign by scoring podium finishes at each of the first six races in 1997. This would be enough to keep title rival Nicolas Minassian at bay, who was hindered by a disqualification from second place and a two-race ban for unsportsmanlike behaviour at the third round at Thruxton. The Frenchman was baulked by backmarker Michael Bentwood whilst leading, allowing Kane to overtake and take victory. After the chequered flag, the infuriated Minassian proceeded to brake-test Bentwood to a halt and hurl gravel towards the Englishman. Without having lost the 15 points awarded for second position as well as further potential points at the next two races, it is highly likely that Minassian would have been champion.

The scoring system was 20-15-12-10-8-6-4-3-2-1 points awarded to the first ten finishers, with 1 (one) extra point added to the driver who set the fastest lap of the race. All results counted towards the driver's final tally.

== Drivers and Teams ==
Team	No.	Driver	Chassis	Engine	Rounds
Class A
(United Kingdom) Stewart Racing	1	(United Kingdom) Jonny Kane	Dallara F397	Mugen Honda	All
(United Kingdom) Stewart Racing	2	(United Kingdom) Peter Dumbreck	Dallara F397	Mugen Honda	All
(United Kingdom) Fortec Motorsport	3	(United Kingdom) Ben Collins	Dallara F397	HKS Mitsubishi	All
(United Kingdom) Fortec Motorsport	4	(Argentina) Brian Smith	Dallara F397	HKS Mitsubishi	All
(France) Promatecme	5	(Brazil) Enrique Bernoldi	Dallara F397	Renault	All
(France) Promatecme	6	(France) Nicolas Minassian	Dallara F397	Renault	1-3, 6-16
(France) Promatecme	6	(United Kingdom) Darren Manning	Dallara F397	Renault	4-5
(United Kingdom) Alan Docking Racing	7	(Japan) Haruki Kurosawa	Dallara F397	Mugen Honda	All
(United Kingdom) Alan Docking Racing	8	(Japan) Yudai Igarashi	Dallara F397	Mugen Honda	All
(United Kingdom) Alan Docking Racing	11	(Australia) Mark Webber	Dallara F397	Mugen Honda	All
(United Kingdom) SpeedSport F3	9	(United Kingdom) Michael Bentwood	Dallara F397	Mugen Honda	1, 3-16
(United Kingdom) SpeedSport F3	10	(United Kingdom) Darren Manning	Dallara F396	Mugen Honda	1-3, 6-16
(United Kingdom) SpeedSport F3	10	(United Kingdom) Andy Priaulx	Dallara F396	Mugen Honda	4-5
(Republic of Ireland) Martin Donnelly Racing	14	(United Kingdom) Mark Shaw	Dallara F397	Opel	All
(Republic of Ireland) Martin Donnelly Racing	15	(Brazil) Mario Haberfeld	Dallara F397	Opel	All
(United Kingdom) Carlin Motorsport	25	(United Kingdom) Henry Stanton	Dallara F397	Mugen Honda	1-9, 11, 14
(United Kingdom) Carlin Motorsport	25	(United Kingdom) Jamie Spence	Dallara F397	Mugen Honda	16
(United Kingdom) TOM'S	16	(Italy) Giovanni Anapoli	TOM'S 037F	Toyota	1-4
(United Kingdom) TOM'S	16	(United Kingdom) Jamie Spence	TOM'S 037F	Toyota	5-8
(United Kingdom) TOM'S	16	(United Kingdom) Andy Priaulx	TOM'S 037F	Toyota	15-16
(United Kingdom) TOM'S	17	(United Kingdom) Kevin McGarrity	TOM'S 037F	Toyota	1-10
(United Kingdom) TOM'S	19	(United Kingdom) Darren Turner	TOM'S 037F	Toyota	7-13
(United Kingdom) TOM'S	32	(Brazil) Ricardo Mauricio	TOM'S 037F	Toyota	7-16
(United Kingdom) DC Cook Motorsport	18	(United Kingdom) Guy Smith	Dallara F397	Opel	All
(United Kingdom) DC Cook Motorsport	22	(United Kingdom) Paula Cook	Dallara F397	Opel	All
(United Kingdom) Portman Racing	21	(United Kingdom) Darren Turner	Dallara F397	HKS Mitsubishi	1-5
(United Kingdom) Portman Racing	21	(United Kingdom) Warren Hughes	Dallara F397	HKS Mitsubishi	9-16
(United Kingdom) Portman Racing	27	(Malaysia) Alex Yoong	Dallara F397	HKS Mitsubishi	14-15
(Brazil) MRS	32	(Brazil) Ricardo Mauricio	Dallara F397	Mugen Honda	1-5
(United Kingdom) Intersport	24	(New Zealand) Simon Wills	Dallara F397	Opel	All
(United Kingdom) DKS	25	(United Kingdom) Tommy Field	TOM'S 037F	Toyota	8
(United Kingdom) DKS	25	(United Kingdom) Jamie Spence	TOM'S 037F	Toyota	12-13
(United Kingdom) Rowan Racing	26	(United Kingdom) Martin O'Connell	TOM'S 037F	Toyota	12-16
(France) ASM	30	(Belgium) David Saelens	Dallara F397	Opel	14
(France) ASM	31	(France) Sebastien Philippe	Dallara F397	Opel	14
(France) La Filiere	33	(France) Franck Montagny	Martini MK73	Opel	14
(France) La Filiere	34	(Spain) Oriol Servia	Martini MK73	Opel	14
(France) La Filiere	35	(Switzerland) Marcel Fässler	Martini MK73	Opel	14
(Netherlands) Van Amersfoort Racing	36	(Belgium) Bas Leinders	Dallara F397	Opel	14
(Italy) Prema Powerteam	37	(Netherlands) Donny Crevels	Dallara F397	Opel	14
(Germany) Opel Team BSR	38	(Germany) Andreas Scheld	Dallara F397	Opel	14
(Belgium) JB Motorsports	39	(Belgium) Yves Olivier	Dallara F397	Opel	14
Class B
(United Kingdom) Rowan Racing	51	(United Kingdom) Martin O'Connell	Dallara F395	Toyota	1-6, 8-11
(United Kingdom) Rowan Racing	51	(United Kingdom) Ian James	Dallara F395	Toyota	14-15
(United Kingdom) Tarry Falcon Racing	52	(United Kingdom) Jeremy Gumbley	Dallara F396	Mugen Honda	8
(United Kingdom) Tarry Falcon Racing	52	(United Kingdom) Damon Wellman	Dallara F396	Mugen Honda	12-13, 15-16

== Race calendar and results ==
Round	Circuit	Date	Pole position	Fastest lap	Winning driver	Winning team	Class B winner
1	(United Kingdom) Donington Park	23 March	(United Kingdom) Guy Smith	(United Kingdom) Jonny Kane	(United Kingdom) Jonny Kane	(United Kingdom) Stewart Racing	No Finishers
2	(United Kingdom) Silverstone	6 April	(France) Nicolas Minassian	(France) Nicolas Minassian	(France) Nicolas Minassian	(France) Promatecme	No Finishers
3	(United Kingdom) Thruxton	13 April	(France) Nicolas Minassian	(United Kingdom) Peter Dumbreck	(United Kingdom) Jonny Kane	(United Kingdom) Stewart Racing	(United Kingdom) Martin O'Connell
4	(United Kingdom) Brands Hatch	27 April	(Australia) Mark Webber	(Australia) Mark Webber	(Australia) Mark Webber	(United Kingdom) Alan Docking Racing	(United Kingdom) Martin O'Connell
5	(United Kingdom) Silverstone	11 May	(Australia) Mark Webber	(United Kingdom) Jonny Kane	(United Kingdom) Jonny Kane	(United Kingdom) Stewart Racing	(United Kingdom) Martin O'Connell
6	(United Kingdom) Croft	18 May	(United Kingdom) Jonny Kane	(United Kingdom) Peter Dumbreck	(France) Nicolas Minassian	(France) Promatecme	(United Kingdom) Martin O'Connell
7	(United Kingdom) Oulton Park	22 June	(United Kingdom) Jonny Kane	(United Kingdom) Peter Dumbreck	(United Kingdom) Peter Dumbreck	(United Kingdom) Stewart Racing	No Entrants
8	(United Kingdom) Silverstone	12 July	(France) Nicolas Minassian	(Brazil) Enrique Bernoldi	(Brazil) Mario Haberfeld	(United Kingdom) Martin Donnelly Racing	(United Kingdom) Martin O'Connell
9	(United Kingdom) Pembrey	17 August	(Australia) Mark Webber	(Argentina) Brian Smith	(Argentina) Brian Smith	(United Kingdom) Fortec Motorsport	No Finishers
10	(United Kingdom) Pembrey	17 August	(Brazil) Ricardo Mauricio	(France) Nicolas Minassian	(France) Nicolas Minassian	(France) Promatecme	(United Kingdom) Martin O'Connell
11	(United Kingdom) Donington Park	24 August	(France) Nicolas Minassian	(United Kingdom) Martin O'Connell	(France) Nicolas Minassian	(France) Promatecme	(United Kingdom) Martin O'Connell
12	(United Kingdom) Snetterton	14 September	(Argentina) Brian Smith	(Brazil) Enrique Bernoldi	(Brazil) Mario Haberfeld	(United Kingdom) Martin Donnelly Racing	(United Kingdom) Damon Wellman
13	(United Kingdom) Snetterton	14 September	(France) Nicolas Minassian	(France) Nicolas Minassian	(France) Nicolas Minassian	(France) Promatecme	(United Kingdom) Damon Wellman
14*	(Belgium) Spa-Francorchamps	28 September	(France) Franck Montagny	(France) Nicolas Minassian	(Brazil) Enrique Bernoldi	(France) Promatecme	No Finishers
15	(United Kingdom) Silverstone	5 October	(France) Nicolas Minassian	(France) Nicolas Minassian	(France) Nicolas Minassian	(France) Promatecme	(United Kingdom) Ian James
16	(United Kingdom) Thruxton	12 October	(United Kingdom) Jonny Kane	(United Kingdom) Guy Smith	(France) Nicolas Minassian	(France) Promatecme	(United Kingdom) Damon Wellman

- Round 14 was contested by an assortment of entrants from other European F3 championships; they were eligible to score points.

== Championship ==
Championship Class

Pos	Driver	DON (United Kingdom)	SIL (United Kingdom)	THR (United Kingdom)	BRH (United Kingdom)	SIL (United Kingdom)	CRO (United Kingdom)	OUL (United Kingdom)	SIL (United Kingdom)	PEM (United Kingdom)	PEM (United Kingdom)	DON (United Kingdom)	SNE (United Kingdom)	SNE (United Kingdom)	SPA (Belgium)	SIL (United Kingdom)	THR (United Kingdom)	Pts
Class A
1	(United Kingdom) Jonny Kane	1	3	1	3	1	2	4	Ret	2	6	2	3	2	NS	5	2	199
2	(France) Nicolas Minassian	4	1	DSQ	EX	EX	1	Ret	3	Ret	1	1	4	1	6	1	1	183
3	(United Kingdom) Peter Dumbreck	5	2	3	2	4	3	1	13	3	Ret	5	6	5	NS	7	4	149
4	(Australia) Mark Webber	6	6	Ret	1	8	4	8	2	4	3	4	Ret	6	4	3	7	131
5	(Brazil) Enrique Bernoldi	3	INJ	INJ	14	6	5	Ret	10	8	2	8	2	3	1	2	3	127
6	(Brazil) Mario Haberfeld	9	Ret	7	5	3	11	5	1	Ret	4	Ret	1	7	7	21	5	108
7	(Argentina) Brian Smith	Ret	7	4	7	17	8	7	5	1	10	7	7	10	NS	13	Ret	72
8	(United Kingdom) Ben Collins	12	5	8	6	13	7	2	8	11	8	Ret	NS	NS	8	4	8	64
9	(United Kingdom) Guy Smith	2	10	10	8	14	12	6	6	15	9	6	Ret	4	24	8	14	60
10	(United Kingdom) Kevin McGarrity	7	NS	Ret	Ret	11	9	3	4	6	Ret							36
11	(Brazil) Ricardo Mauricio	14	11	6	Ret	15		Ret	7	5	Ret	Ret	8	Ret	9	10	Ret	26
12	(United Kingdom) Darren Manning	10	4	NS	9	5	14	Ret	12	Ret	14	Ret	14	11	NS	9	12	26
13	(New Zealand) Simon Wills	8	Ret	9	11	9	10	Ret	16	Ret	7	11	9	12	12	Ret	11	22
14	(United Kingdom) Jamie Spence					7	Ret	Ret	9				5	9			Ret	18
15	(United Kingdom) Warren Hughes									14	16	9	11	8	Ret	6	6	18
16	(United Kingdom) Mark Shaw	11	9	5	13	Ret	16	9	17	9	13	13	Ret	13	22	12	Ret	16
17	(Belgium) David Saelens														2			15
18	(France) Franck Montagny														3			12
19	(Spain) Oriol Servia														5			8
20	(United Kingdom) Paula Cook	13	NS	12	Ret	Ret	Ret	10	Ret	7	11	16	Ret	Ret	20	18	10	7
21	(Italy) Giovanni Anapoli	Ret	8	13	Ret													3
22	(United Kingdom) Martin O'Connell												Ret	14	11	15	9	2
23	(United Kingdom) Darren Turner	Ret	14	11	Ret	16		Ret	14	Ret	12	15	10	18				2
24	(United Kingdom) Henry Stanton	Ret	12	Ret	Ret	Ret	NS	NS	11	Ret		10			23			2
25	(United Kingdom) Michael Bentwood	15		14	10	12	15	11	19	13	17	17	12	16	21	16	13	1
26	(United Kingdom) Andy Priaulx				16	10										Ret	17	1
27	(Japan) Haruki Kurosawa	16	13	Ret	12	Ret	13	12	18	10	Ret	14	Ret	Ret	19	17	15	1
28	(Belgium) Bas Leinders														10			1
29	(Malaysia) Alex Yoong														16	11		
30	(Japan) Yudai Igarashi	17	15	Ret	15	Ret	Ret	Ret	Ret	12	15	12	13	15	Ret	14	16	
31	(France) Sebastien Philippe														13			
32	(Netherlands) Donny Crevels														14			
33	(Germany) Andreas Scheld														15			
34	(Belgium) Yves Olivier														17			
35	(Switzerland) Marcel Fässler														18			
36	(United Kingdom) Tommy Field								20									
Class B
1	(United Kingdom) Martin O'Connell	Ret	Ret	2	4	2	6		15	Ret	5	3						148
2	(United Kingdom) Damon Wellman												15	17		20	18	78
3	(United Kingdom) Ian James														Ret	19		21
4	(United Kingdom) Jeremy Gumbley								21									15
Pos	Driver	DON (United Kingdom)	SIL (United Kingdom)	THR (United Kingdom)	BRH (United Kingdom)	SIL (United Kingdom)	CRO (United Kingdom)	OUL (United Kingdom)	SIL (United Kingdom)	PEM (United Kingdom)	PEM (United Kingdom)	DON (United Kingdom)	SNE (United Kingdom)	SNE (United Kingdom)	SPA (Belgium)	SIL (United Kingdom)	THR (United Kingdom)	Pts
