= Brian Smith (racing driver) =

Argentine racing driver

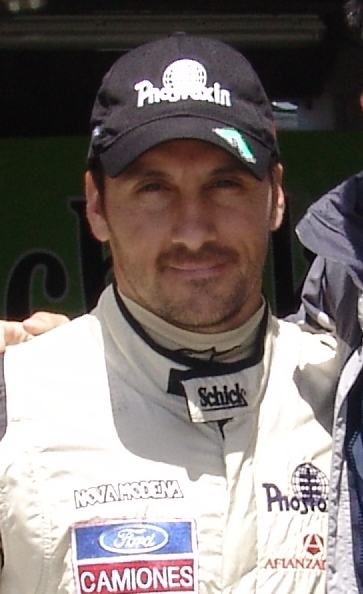
Brian Smith in 2012

Brian Smith (born 22 April 1975 in Castelar, Buenos Aires Province) is a racing driver from Argentina. Smith was the 1995 Argentine Formula Renault champion, before competing in the British Formula 3 Championship and eventually International Formula 3000, entering ten races at that level. After a brief appearance in the World Series by Nissan in 2001, and a subsequent hiatus from the sport, he moved to Argentine touring car racing.

== Life and career ==
=== Formula Three ===
Smith won the 1995 Argentine Formula Renault championship, earning him a place in British Formula 3 for the 1996 season with the TOM'S team. He finished tenth in the championship that year, with a best race finish of third and two starts from pole position. For 1997 season, he moved to Fortec Motorsport, completing the season in seventh position overall. He took his only victory in this class at Pembrey Circuit on 17 August, with a fastest lap of 50.079 seconds which remains the official track record to this day.

=== International Formula 3000 ===
Smith's Formula Three results earned him a seat in International Formula 3000 with Nordic Racing for the 1998 season, qualifying sixth on his debut at Oschersleben. His best result of eighth place came at the Pau Grand Prix, the sixth round of the championship, but he did not compete further in the season due to financial constraints. His race seat was taken by Kevin McGarrity. Recalled to the sport for the 1999 season with Monaco Motorsport, he matched his best 1998 result of eighth at the season opener at Imola, but this would prove to be his only finish of the season. After failing to qualify for rounds 3 and 4 in Spain and France respectively, he was dropped in favour of Cyrille Sauvage.

There was an abortive attempt to found an Argentine-based team for the 2001 season, with Smith and Nicolas Filiberti as drivers.

=== After Formula 3000 ===
After his potential F3000 drive failed to materialise, Smith raced at one weekend of the 2001 World Series by Nissan season for PSN Racing, scoring a single point for a tenth-place finish in one of his two races. This was his last race until 2006, when he signed up to compete in Top Race V6 and TC2000, an Argentine touring car championship. He continues to race in that category, and also has a business importing cars.

== Racing record ==
=== Complete International Formula 3000 results ===
(key) (Races in bold indicate pole position) (Races in italics indicate fastest lap)

Year	Entrant	1	2	3	4	5	6	7	8	9	10	11	12	DC	Points
1998	Nordic Racing	OSC; 10	IMO; Ret	CAT; Ret	SIL; 15	MON; 11	PAU; 8	A1R	HOC	HUN	SPA	PER	NÜR	26th	0
1999	Monaco Motorsport	IMO; 8	MON; Ret	CAT; DNQ	MAG; DNQ	SIL	A1R	HOC	HUN	SPA	NÜR			NC	0

Sporting positions
Preceded by Guillermo Di Giacinti	Argentine Formula Renault Champion; 1995	Succeeded by Martín Basso
