= Maurizio Mediani =

Italian racing driver (born 1968)

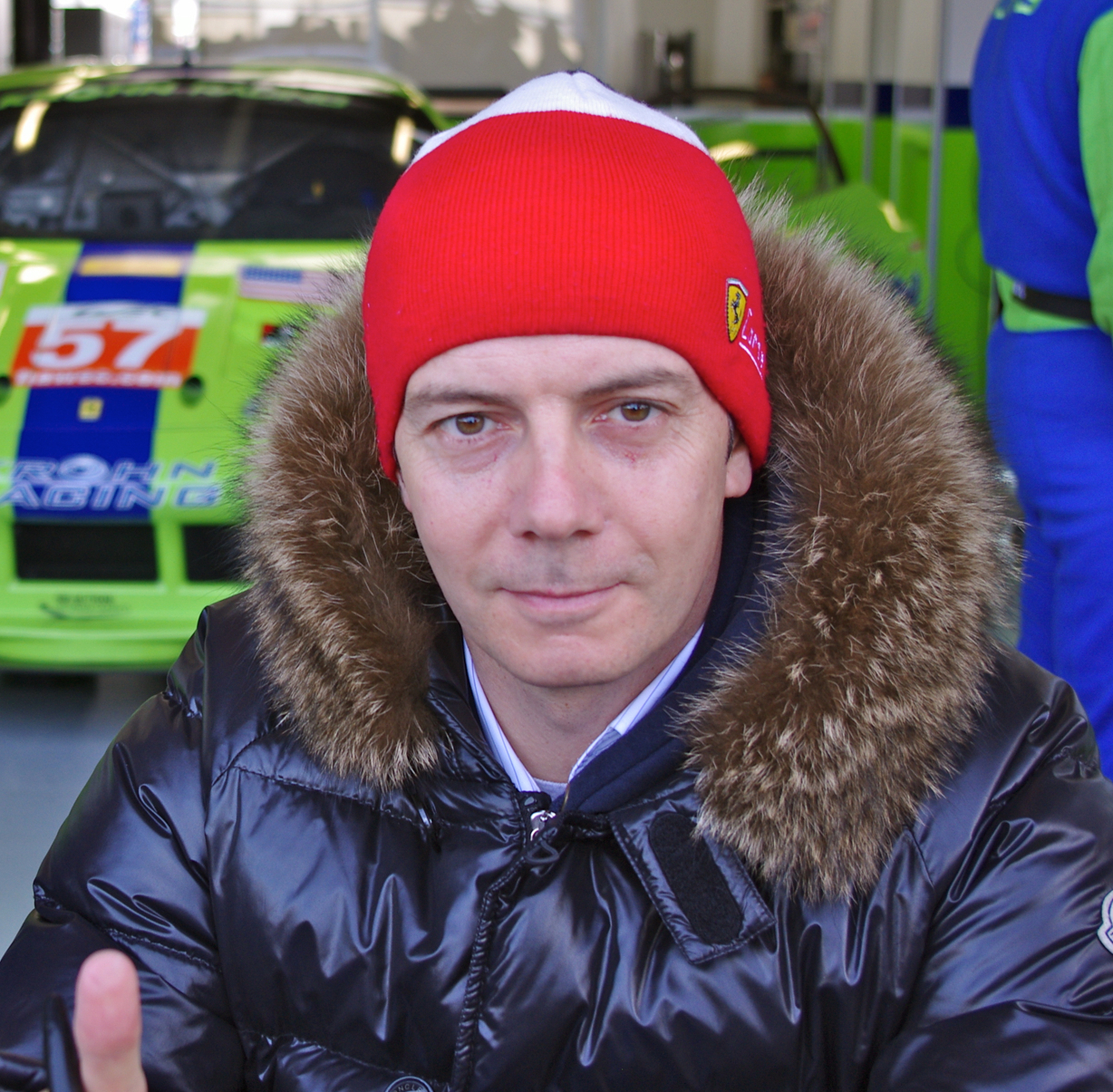
- Mediani in 2013
- Nationality: (Italy) Italian
- Born: 21 September 1968 (age 58) Reggio Emilia, Italy
- Categorisation: FIA Gold (until 2015) (Note: During the 2012–2014 period, Mediani simultaneously held an FIA GT3 categorisation of gold and an FIA WEC categorisation of silver. When both lists were merged in 2015, he was ranked gold. He was downgraded back to silver for 2016.); FIA Silver (2012–2014, 2016–2025); FIA Bronze (2026–)

Championship titles
- 2010 2001: Superstars GTSprint Series – GT2; Russian Formula Three Championship

Maurizio Mediani (born 21 September 1968) is an Italian racing driver who last competed in the GT World Challenge Europe Endurance Cup for AF Corse. A long-term Ferrari specialist and Michelotto test driver, he raced in the FIA World Endurance Championship from 2013 to 2016, primarily in LMP2 for SMP Racing. In 2023, he became the first man to drive Isotta Fraschini's Le Mans Hypercar.

== Career ==
Mediani made his single-seater debut in 1992, racing in the Italian Formula Three Championship. Racing until 1998 in the series, Mediani won five times and most notably finished third overall in his last season in the series for Venturini Racing. After a brief escapade in the Japanese Formula 3 Championship for HKS Ralliart in 1999, Mediani spent three years in Russian F3, winning the 2001 edition and finishing runner-up in the other two seasons. In 2003, Mediani made his sportscar debut by racing part-time in the N-GT class of the FIA GT Championship for Porsche-fielding Autorlando Sport. The following year, Mediani joined Ferrari customer team JMB Racing for part-time campaigns in the Rolex Sports Car Series, Italian GT and FIA GT Championships. In his first year with the team, Mediani won on his Italian GT debut at Imola, as well as scoring a lone GT podium in the Rolex Sports Car Series at Homestead–Miami.

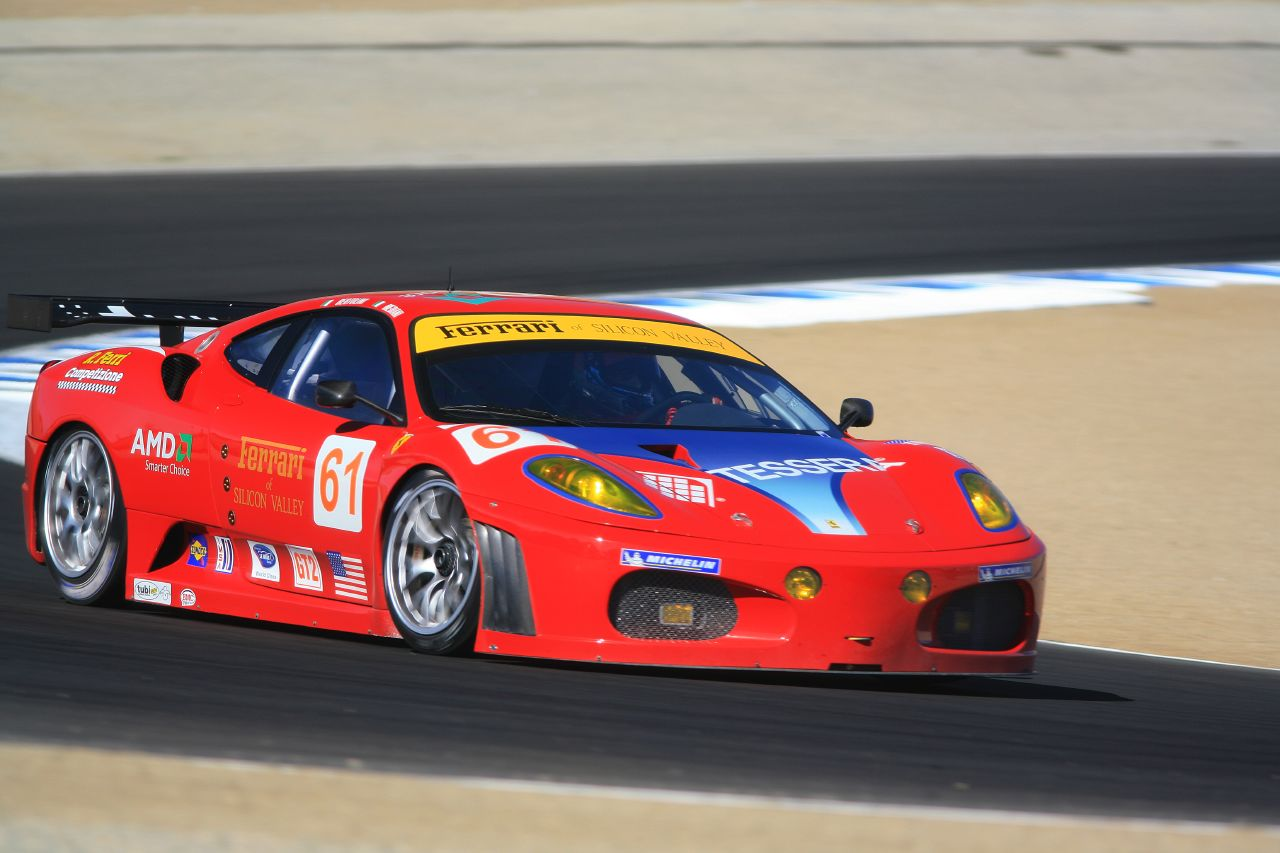
Mediani's Risi Competizione Ferrari at Laguna Seca in 2006.

After a full season in Italian GT for JMB in 2005, Mediani returned to the series the following year, primarily competing for Victory Engineering, and took four wins en route to fourth in the GT2 standings. During 2006, Mediani also won on his International GT Open debut with the team at Valencia, as well as scoring a pair of second-place finishes for Risi Competizione on a limited schedule in the American Le Mans Series. Following part-time campaigns in the American Le Mans Series and FIA GT Championship in 2007, which yielded a podium at Zolder in FIA GT, Mediani returned to Italian GT for 2008 with Racing Team Edil Cris, taking three podiums to secure fifth in the GT2 standings. Towards the end of the year, Mediani scored his only 6 Hours of Vallelunga win alongside Marco Cioci and Piergiuseppe Perazzini aboard Advanced Engineering's Ferrari F430 GTC.

A one-off appearance in International GT Open for Vittoria Competizioni then ensued in 2009, before Mediani remained with the team to compete in the Superstars GTSprint Series in 2010 alongside Alessandro Bonetti. Starting off the season with wins at Monza and Imola, Mediani then won again at the Hockenheimring, Le Castellet and Vallelunga to secure the GT2 title. After a one-year hiatus, Mediani finished second at the 24 Hours of Barcelona for Russian Bears Motorsport, as well as racing for Ferrari-affiliated AF Corse in a one-off appearance in the Blancpain Endurance Series and the Gulf 12 Hours.

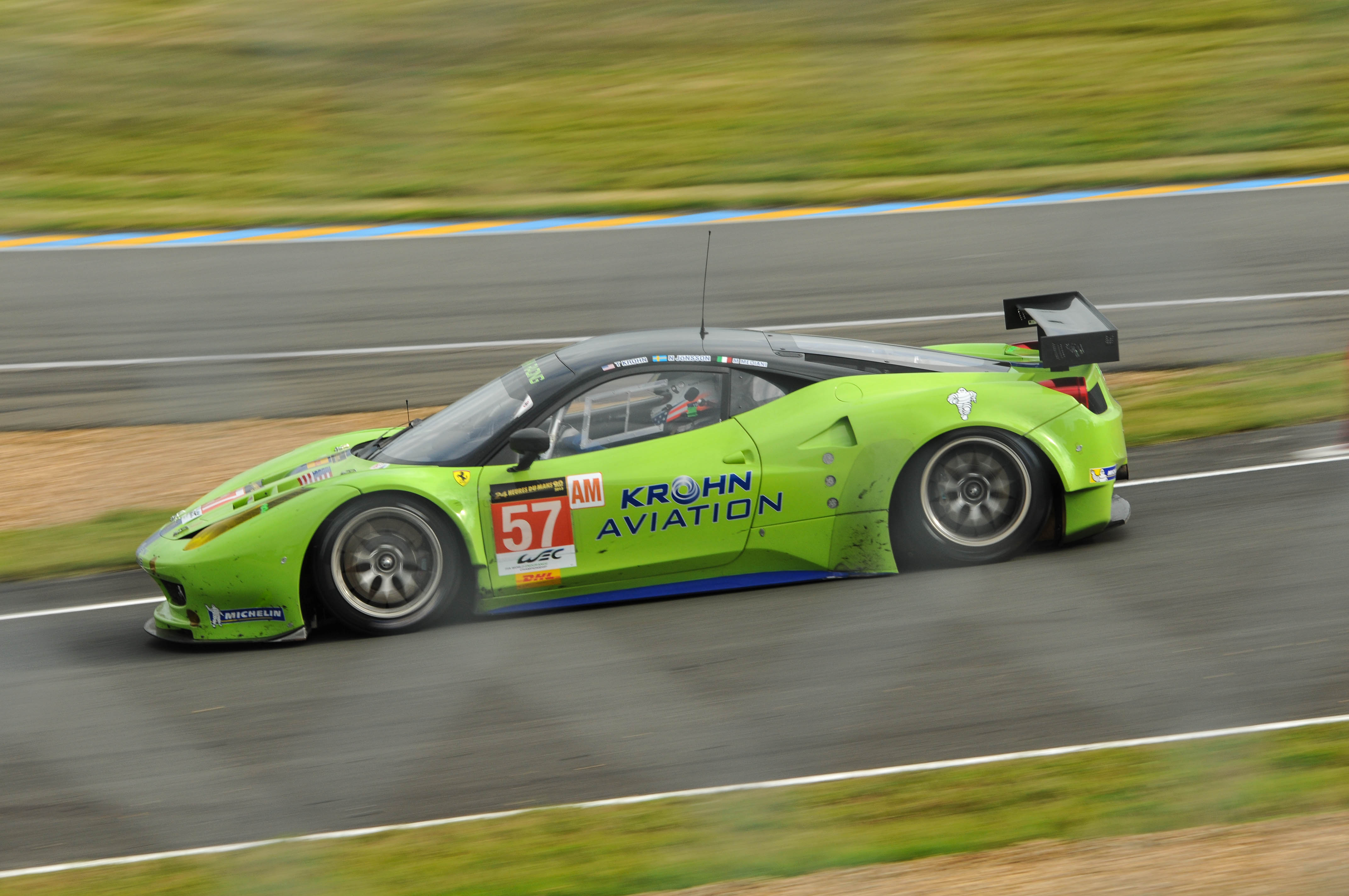
Mediani made his 24 Hours of Le Mans debut in 2013 for Krohn Racing.

In 2013, Mediani joined Krohn Racing to compete in the LMGTE Am class of the FIA World Endurance Championship, thus making his 24 Hours of Le Mans debut at 44 years old. Mediani, Niclas Jönsson and team owner Tracy Krohn could only muster a best finish of fifth at Interlagos, as the No. 57 Ferrari 458 Italia GT2 finished last in the LMGTE Am standings. In parallel, Mediani also raced with AF Corse–run SMP Racing on a part-time basis in the Blancpain Endurance Series, and featured in both the GTC and LMP2 classes of the European Le Mans Series.

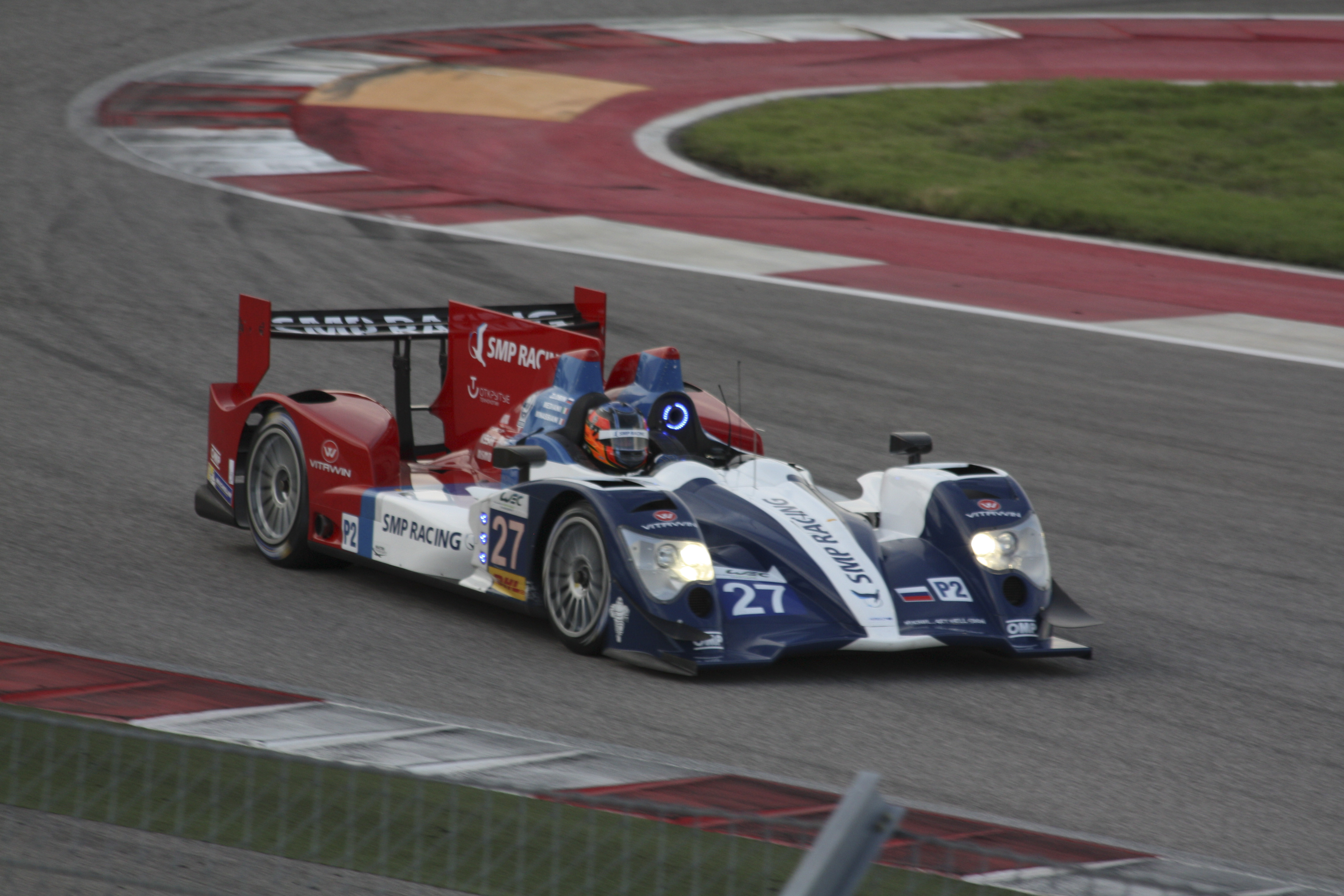
Mediani driving SMP Racing's Oreca 03R LMP2 at Austin in 2014.

Continuing with SMP Racing for 2014, Mediani raced with them in the LMP2 class of the FIA World Endurance Championship and the GTC class of the European Le Mans Series. Between the two campaigns, Mediani found more success in WEC, taking five podiums en route to a fifth-place points finish in points together with Nicolas Minassian. During 2014, Mediani also raced in the first two rounds of the United SportsCar Championship in GTD for SMP-backed Extreme Speed Motorsports and AIM Autosport, most notably finishing second at the 12 Hours of Sebring with the latter.

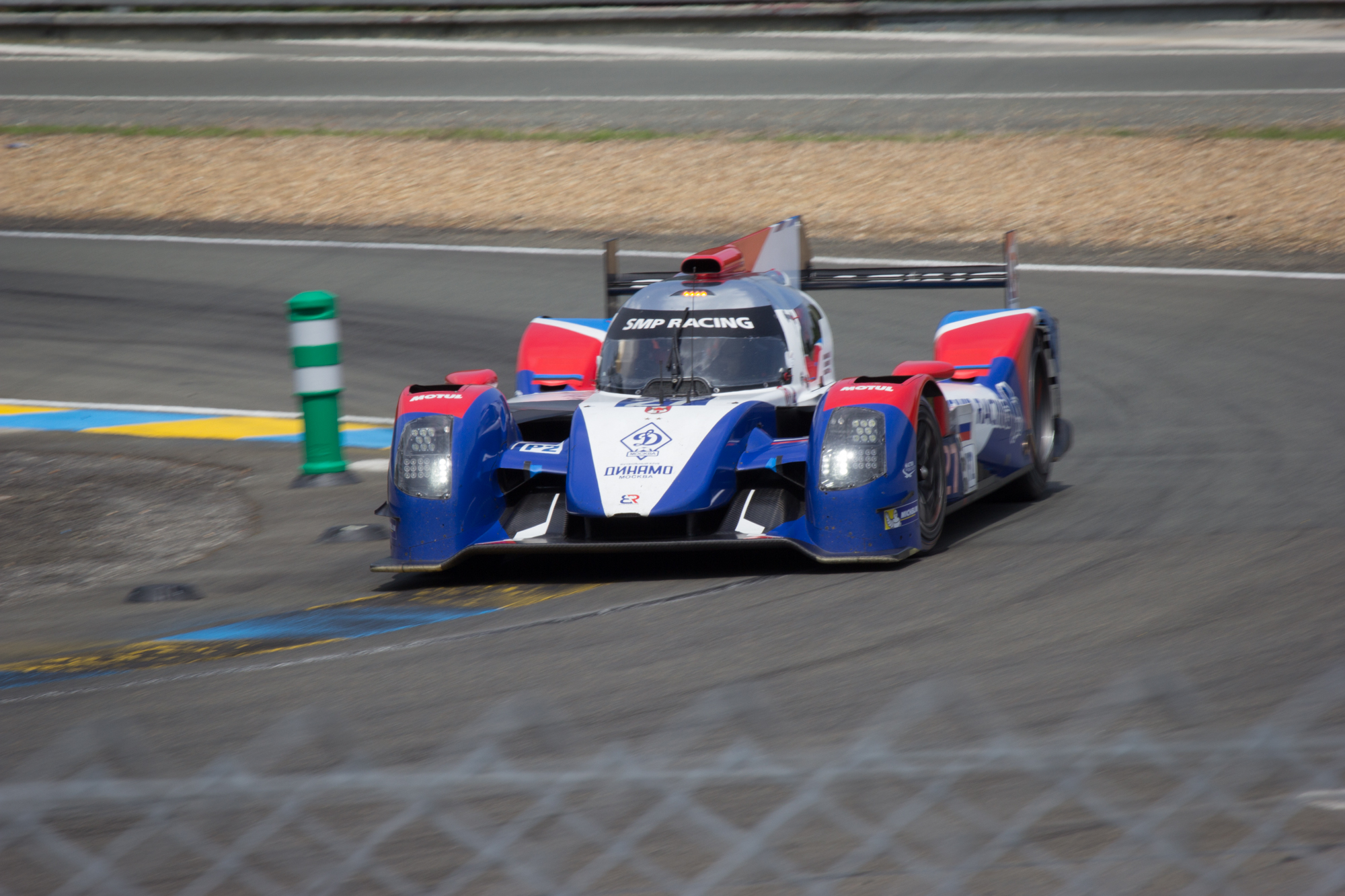
Mediani's SMP-built BR Engineering BR01 at the 2015 24 Hours of Le Mans.

Remaining with SMP for 2015, Mediani partnered David Markozov and Minassian in the LMP2 class of the European Le Mans Series and 24 Hours of Le Mans, as the team transitioned from the Oreca 03R to the homebuilt BR Engineering BR01. In 2016, Mediani and SMP made their full-season return to the FIA World Endurance Championship, placing tenth with a best result of fourth at the Circuit of the Americas. Mediani also assisted the BR01's IMSA debut at the 24 Hours of Daytona, which saw Mikhail Aleshin take a shock pole position in the rain.

Scaling back to GT racing for 2017, Mediani began the year driving a Ferrari 488 GT3 for AF Corse–owned Spirit of Race at the 24 Hours of Daytona in GTD. Continuing with the team for the rest of the year in the Le Mans Cup, Mediani finished third on his series debut at Monza in LMP3, before competing in the next two rounds in GT3, in which he scored a pair of second-place finishes.

In 2018, Mediani stayed with Spirit of Race for his first full season in the Le Mans Cup, winning the second race at Road to Le Mans and taking two other podiums to secure runner-up honours in GT3 with Christoph Ulrich. Mediani and Ulrich stuck together in 2019, as they took three podiums en route to a fourth-place points finish. After being out of a seat for much of 2020, Mediani made a brief racing return towards the end of the year, competing for AF Corse at the GT World Challenge Europe Endurance Cup season finale at Le Castellet.

In 2023, as part of his Michelotto Engineering test duties, Mediani became the first person to drive Isotta Fraschini's new Hypercar, the Isotta Fraschini Tipo 6 LMH-C, at the car's shakedown at Vallelunga in April.

== Karting record ==
=== Karting career summary ===
Season	Series	Team	Position
1987	Karting World Championship — Formula K		3rd
1988	Karting World Championship — Formula K		3rd

== Racing record ==
=== Racing career summary ===
Season	Series	Team	Races	Wins	Poles	F/Laps	Podiums	Points	Position
1992	Italian Formula Three Championship	Passoli Racing	6	0	0	0	0	0	NC
1993	Italian Formula Three Championship	BVM Racing	12	0	0	0	1	11	9th
1994	Italian Formula Three Championship	Supercars CM	20	0	0	0	2	85	6th
1994	Monaco Grand Prix Formula Three	Supercars CM	1	0	0	0	0	—N/a	17th
1995	Italian Formula Three Championship	Team Ghinzani	20	0	0	0	0	74	9th
1995	Masters of Formula 3	Team Ghinzani	1	0	0	0	0	—N/a	23rd
1996	Italian Formula Three Championship	Cevenini Junior Team	10	2	0	0	3	80	5th
1996	Masters of Formula 3	Cevenini Junior Team	1	0	0	0	0	—N/a	7th
1997	Italian Formula Three Championship	Venturini Racing	10	1	1	3	4	81	4th
1997	Monaco Grand Prix Formula Three	Venturini Racing	1	0	0	0	0	—N/a	8th
1997	Macau Grand Prix	EF Project	1	0	0	0	0	—N/a	DNF
1998	Italian Formula Three Championship	Venturini Racing	10	2	1	0	6	112	**3rd**
1998	Masters of Formula 3	Venturini Racing	1	0	0	0	0	—N/a	12th
1999	Japanese Formula 3 Championship	HKS Ralliart	10	0	0	0	0	7	10th
2000	Russian Formula Three Championship	Artline Engineering		3				86	**2nd**
2001	Russian Formula Three Championship	Artline Engineering		5			7	134	**1st**
2001	Open Telefónica by Nissan	Venturini Racing	2	0	0	0	0	1	25th
2002	Russian Formula Three Championship	Artline Engineering	4	3			4	75	**2nd**
2003	FIA GT Championship – N-GT	Autorlando Sport	2	0	0	0	0	4	42nd
2004	Rolex Sports Car Series – GT	JMB Racing USA	3	0	0	0	1	50	36th
2004	Italian GT Championship	JMB Racing	2	1	0	0	1	20	19th
2004	FIA GT Championship – GT	JMB Racing	1	0	0	0	0	0	NC
2005	Italian GT Championship – GT2	JMB Racing	14	0	2	3	0	91	8th
2006	Italian GT Championship – GT2	Made in Italy	2	0	0	0	0	151	4th
2006	Italian GT Championship – GT2	Victory Engineering	10	4	1	2	8	151	4th
2006	American Le Mans Series – GT2	Risi Competizione	3	0	0	0	2	45	14th
2006	International GT Open – GTA	Victory Engineering	3	1	0	0	2	32	9th
2007	American Le Mans Series – GT2	Corsa/White Lightning	1	0	0	0	0	8	42nd
2007	American Le Mans Series – GT2	Corsa Motorsports	1	0	0	0	0	8	42nd
2007	FIA GT Championship – GT2	Racing Team Edil Cris	3	0	0	0	0	13	19th
2007	FIA GT Championship – GT2	Advanced Engineering	1	0	0	0	1	13	19th
2008	Italian GT Championship – GT2	Racing Team Edil Cris	14	0	0	1	3	91	5th
2008	FIA GT Championship – GT2	Kessel Racing	1	0	0	0	0	5	26th
2008	International GT Open – GTA	Advanced Engineering	2	1	0	0	1	10	18th
2008	6 Hours of Vallelunga	Advanced Engineering	1	1	0	0	1	—N/a	**1st**
2009	500 km Interlagos – Class I		1	0	0	0	0	—N/a	DNF
2009	International GT Open – Super GT	Vittoria Competizioni	2	0	0	0	0	0	NC
2010	Superstars GTSprint Series – GT2	Vittoria Competizioni	12	5	1	3	11	204	**1st**
2012	Malaysia Merdeka Endurance Race	AF Corse	1	0	0	0	0	—N/a	4th
2012	Blancpain Endurance Series – Pro-Am	AF Corse	1	0	0	0	0	1	38th
2012	24 Hours of Barcelona – A6	Russian Bears Motorsport 1	1	0	0	0	1	—N/a	**2nd**
2012	Gulf 12 Hours	AF Waltrip	1	0	0	0	0	—N/a	4th
2013	FIA World Endurance Championship – LMGTE Am	Krohn Racing	8	0	0	0	0	32	17th
2013	24 Hours of Le Mans – LMGTE Am	Krohn Racing	1	0	0	0	0	—N/a	DNF
2013	Blancpain Endurance Series – Pro-Am	SMP Racing	3	0	0	0	0	30	13th
2013	European Le Mans Series – GTC	SMP Racing	1	0	0	0	0	0	NC
2013	European Le Mans Series – LMP2	SMP Racing	3	0	0	0	0	28	12th
2014	United SportsCar Championship – GTD	SMP/ESM Racing	1	0	0	0	0	62	39th
2014	United SportsCar Championship – GTD	AIM Autosport	1	0	0	0	1	62	39th
2014	FIA World Endurance Championship – LMP2	SMP Racing	8	0	0	0	5	96	5th
2014	24 Hours of Le Mans – LMP2	SMP Racing	1	0	0	0	0	—N/a	DNF
2014	European Le Mans Series – GTC	SMP Racing	4	0	0	0	0	4	28th
2015	European Le Mans Series – LMP2	AF Corse	1	0	0	0	0	30	8th
2015	European Le Mans Series – LMP2	SMP Racing	2	0	0	0	0	30	8th
2015	European Le Mans Series – LMP2	AF Racing	2	0	0	0	0	30	8th
2015	24 Hours of Le Mans – LMP2	SMP Racing	1	0	0	0	0	—N/a	6th
2016	IMSA SportsCar Championship – Prototype	SMP Racing	1	0	0	0	0	23	33rd
2016	FIA World Endurance Championship – LMP2	SMP Racing	9	0	0	0	0	59	10th
2016	24 Hours of Le Mans – LMP2	SMP Racing	1	0	0	0	0	—N/a	6th
2017	IMSA SportsCar Championship – GTD	Spirit of Race	1	0	0	0	0	9	81st
2017	Le Mans Cup – LMP3	Spirit of Race	1	0	0	0	1	15	13th
2017	Le Mans Cup – GT3	Spirit of Race	3	0	0	1	2	27.5	8th
2017	European Le Mans Series – LMP3	AT Racing	1	0	0	0	0	0	30th
2018	Le Mans Cup – GT3	Spirit of Race	7	0	0	0	3	83	**2nd**
2019	Le Mans Cup – GT3	Spirit of Race	7	0	0	0	3	69	4th
2020	GT World Challenge Europe Endurance Cup – Pro-Am	AF Corse	1	0	0	0	0	0	NC

=== Complete FIA GT Championship results ===
(key) (Races in bold indicate pole position) (Races in italics indicate fastest lap)

Year	Team	Car	Class	1	2	3	4	5	6	7	8	9	10	11	12	13	Pos.	Pts
2003	Autorlando Sport	Porsche 911 GT3-RS	N-GT	CAT	MAG	PER	BRN	DON	SPA; 6H; 11	SPA; 12H; 10	SPA; 24H; 6	AND	OSC	EST; 8	MNZ		42nd	4
2004	JMB Racing	Ferrari 575 GTC	GT	MNZ	VAL	MAG	HOC	BRN	DON	SPA; 6H	SPA; 12H	SPA; 24H	IMO	OSC	DUB	ZHU; 9	NC	0
2007	Racing Team Edil Cris	Ferrari F430 GTC	GT2	ZHU	SIL	BUC	MNZ	OSC	SPA; 6H	SPA; 12H	SPA; 24H	ADR; 6	BRN; DSQ	NOG; 5			19th	13
2007	Advanced Engineering	Ferrari F430 GTC	GT2												ZOL; 3		19th	13
2008	Kessel Racing	Ferrari F430 GTC	GT2	SIL	MNZ	ADR	OSC	SPA; 6H	SPA; 12H	SPA; 24H	BUC; 1	BUC; 2	BRN	NOG; 4	ZOL	SAN	26th	5

=== Complete Grand-Am Rolex Sports Car Series results ===
(key) (Races in bold indicate pole position; results in italics indicate fastest lap)

Year	Team	Class	Make	Engine	1	2	3	4	5	6	7	8	9	10	11	12	Rank	Points
2004	JMB Racing USA	GT	Ferrari 360 Modena	Ferrari F131 3.6 L V8	DAY; 21	MIA	PHX	MTR; 11	WGL	DAY	MOH	WGL	MIA; 3	VIR	BAR	FON	36th	50

=== Complete American Le Mans Series results ===
Year	Entrant	Class	Chassis	Engine	1	2	3	4	5	6	7	8	9	10	11	12	Rank	Points
2006	Risi Competizione	GT2	Ferrari F430 GTC	Ferrari F136 GT 4.0 L V8	SEB	REL	MOH	LIM	MIL	POR	RDA	MOS; 2	PET; 2	LGA; 7			14th	15
2007	Corsa/White Lightning	GT2	Ferrari F430 GTC	Ferrari F136 GT 4.0 L V8	SEB; Ret	STP	LBH	REL									42nd	8
2007	Corsa Motorsports	GT2	Ferrari F430 GTC	Ferrari F136 GT 4.0 L V8					MIL; 5	LIM	MOH	RDA	MOS	DET	PET	LGA	42nd	8

=== Complete Superstars GTSprint Series results ===
(key) (Races in bold indicate pole position) (Races in italics indicate fastest lap)

Year	Team	Class	Car	1	2	3	4	5	6	7	8	9	10	11	12	DC	Points
2010	Vittoria Competizioni	GT2	Ferrari F430	MNZ; 1; 2	MNZ; 2; 1	IMO; 1; 1	IMO; 2; 2	ALG; 1; 2	ALG; 2; 4	HOC; 1; 2	HOC; 2; 1	LEC; 1; 1	LEC; 2; 3	**VAL**; **1**; 1	VAL; 2; 2	1st	204

=== Complete GT World Challenge Europe results ===
==== GT World Challenge Europe Endurance Cup ====
(key) (Races in bold indicate pole position; races in italics indicate fastest lap)

Year	Team	Car	Class	1	2	3	4	5	6	7	8	Pos.	Points
2012	AF Corse	Ferrari 458 Italia GT3	Pro-Am	MNZ	SIL; 18	LEC	SPA; 6H	SPA; 12H	SPA; 24H	NÜR	NAV	38th	1
2013	SMP Racing	Ferrari 458 Italia GT3	Pro-Am	MNZ	SIL; 32	LEC; 44	SPA; 6H ?	SPA; 12H ?	SPA; 24H; 6	NÜR		13th	30
2020	AF Corse	Ferrari 488 GT3	Pro-Am	IMO	NÜR	SPA; 6H	SPA; 12H	SPA; 24H	LEC; Ret			NC	0

=== Complete FIA World Endurance Championship results ===
(key) (Races in bold indicate pole position; races in italics indicate fastest lap)

Year	Entrant	Class	Car	Engine	1	2	3	4	5	6	7	8	9	Pos.	Pts
2013	Krohn Racing	LMGTE Am	Ferrari 458 Italia GT2	Ferrari F136 4.5 V8	SIL; 6	SPA; 7	LMS; Ret	SÃO; 5	COA; 8	FUJ; 6	SHA; Ret	BHR; Ret		17th	32
2014	SMP Racing	LMP2	Oreca 03	Nissan VK45DE 4.5 L V8	SIL; 3	SPA; 4								5th	96
2014	SMP Racing	LMP2	Oreca 03R	Nissan VK45DE 4.5 L V8			LMS; Ret	COA; 2	FUJ; 3	SHA; 2	BHR; Ret	SÃO; 2		5th	96
2016	SMP Racing	LMP2	BR Engineering BR01	Nissan VK45DE 4.5 L V8	SIL; 10	SPA; Ret	LMS; 5	NÜR; 8	MEX; 7	COA; 4	FUJ; 8	SHA; 6	BHR; 9	10th	59

=== 24 Hours of Le Mans results ===
Year	Team	Co-Drivers	Car	Class	Laps	Pos.	Class Pos.
2013	(United States) Krohn Racing	(United States) Tracy Krohn (Sweden) Niclas Jönsson	Ferrari 458 Italia GT2	GTE; Am	111	DNF	DNF
2014	(Russia) SMP Racing	(Russia) Kirill Ladygin (France) Nicolas Minassian	Oreca 03R-Nissan	LMP2	9	DNF	DNF
2015	(Russia) SMP Racing	(Russia) David Markozov (France) Nicolas Minassian	BR Engineering BR01-Nissan	LMP2	340	14th	6th
2016	(Russia) SMP Racing	(Russia) Mikhail Aleshin (France) Nicolas Minassian	BR Engineering BR01-Nissan	LMP2	347	11th	7th

=== Complete European Le Mans Series results ===
(key) (Races in bold indicate pole position; results in italics indicate fastest lap)

Year	Entrant	Class	Chassis	Engine	1	2	3	4	5	6	Rank	Points
2013	SMP Racing	GTC	Ferrari 458 Italia GT3	Ferrari F136 4.5 V8	SIL	IMO; 4					NC	0
2013	SMP Racing	LMP2	Oreca 03	Nissan VK45DE 4.5 L V8			RBR; 6	HUN; 4	LEC; 6		12th	28
2014	SMP Racing	GTC	Ferrari 458 Italia GT3	Ferrari F136 4.5 V8	SIL	IMO; 10	RBR; 9	LEC; 11	EST; 11		28th	4
2015	AF Corse	LMP2	Oreca 03	Nissan VK45DE 4.5 L V8	SIL; 6						8th	30
2015	SMP Racing	LMP2	BR Engineering BR01	Nissan VK45DE 4.5 L V8		IMO; Ret	RBR; Ret				8th	30
2015	AF Racing	LMP2	BR Engineering BR01	Nissan VK45DE 4.5 L V8				LEC; 4	EST; 5		8th	30
2017	AT Racing	LMP3	Ligier JS P3	Nissan VK50VE 5.0 L V8	SIL	MNZ; Ret	RBR	LEC	SPA	ALG	30th	0

=== Complete IMSA SportsCar Championship results ===
(key) (Races in bold indicate pole position; races in italics indicate fastest lap)

Year	Entrant	Class	Chassis	Engine	1	2	3	4	5	6	7	8	9	10	11	12	Rank	Points
2014	SMP/ESM Racing	GTD	Ferrari 458 Italia GT3	Ferrari F136 4.5 V8	DAY; 4												39th	62
2014	AIM Autosport	GTD	Ferrari 458 Italia GT3	Ferrari F136 4.5 V8		SEB; 2	LGA	DET	WGL	MOS	IMS	ELK	VIR	COA	PET		39th	62
2016	SMP Racing	P	BR Engineering BR01	Nissan VK45DE 4.5 L V8	DAY; 9	SEB	LBH	LAG	DET	WGL	MOS	ROA	COA	PET			33rd	23
2017	Spirit of Race	GTD	Ferrari 488 GT3	Ferrari F154CB 3.9 L Turbo V8	DAY; 23	SEB	LBH	COA	DET	WGL	MOS	LIM	ELK	VIR	LGA	PET	81st	9

=== Complete Le Mans Cup results ===
(key) (Races in bold indicate pole position; results in italics indicate fastest lap)

Year	Entrant	Class	Chassis	1	2	3	4	5	6	7	Rank	Points
2017	Spirit of Race	LMP3	Ligier JS P3	MNZ; 3							13th	15
2017	Spirit of Race	GT3	Ferrari 458 Italia GT3		LMS; 1; 2	LMS; 2; 13	RBR; 2	LEC	SPA	POR	8th	27.5
2018	Spirit of Race	GT3	Ferrari 488 GT3	LEC; 2	MNZ; 4	LMS; 1; 5	LMS; 2; 1	RBR; 3	SPA; 4	POR; 7	2nd	83
2019	Spirit of Race	GT3	Ferrari 488 GT3	LEC; 7	MNZ; 3	LMS; 1; 3	LMS; 2; 5	BAR; 6	SPA; 3	POR; 5	4th	69
