= Welsh Sports and Saloon Car Championship =

The Welsh Sports and Saloon Car Championship is organised by the BARC and the Welsh Racing Drivers’ Association, the main venue of the championship being Pembrey.

The 2026 season saw the championship racing at Castle Combe, Oulton Park and Pembrey. The championship has also raced at Ty Croes in Anglesey, Donington Park, Mallory Park, Silverstone, Mondello Park, Lydden Hill, Thruxton, amongst others in the past.

The reigning champion is James Harvey, winning the title in 2026 driving a Porsche Boxster S.

== Class Structure ==
The championship was first awarded in 1991 and has been contested every season since then. The class structure is modified for 2008 as follows: Class A, for road based saloon and sports cars up to 1600cc. Class B is contested by modified, road based saloon and sports cars with engines of up to 2000cc. Class C follows the same rules as Class B, except that it requires engine sizes to be above 2000cc. Finally Class D is for cars conforming to Touring car racing regulations and re-engined sports cars, such as Caterhams. Points are awarded depending on where the driver finishes in their class (in essence, there are four race winners), with the overall championship being awarded to the driver who has managed to accumulate the most class points, regardless of their overall results in the races.

== Champions ==
Year	Driver	Car
1990	Blake Edwards	Ford Capri
1991	Blake Edwards	Ford Capri
1992	Colin Gunderson	Porsche 911
1993	Ken Davies	Porsche 924
1994	Martin Davies	Ford Sierra Sapphire
1995	Martin Davies	Ford Sierra Sapphire
1996	Martin Davies	Ford Sierra Sapphire
1997	Peter Dark	Darrian T90
1998	Mark Chandler	Mini
1999	Graham Cole	Darrian T90
2000	Clive Hayes	Radical Prosport
2001	Terry Brown	LM3000 Prosport
2002	Terry Brown	Radical Prosport
2003	Rhodri Jenkins	Honda Civic
2004	Rhodri Jenkins	Honda Civic
2005	Andrew Williams	Ford Sierra Sapphire
2006	Andy Williams	Ford Sierra Sapphire
2007	Keith Butcher	Audi R8
2009	Russell Haggerty	Raw Striker
2010	Russell Haggerty	Ford Ka
2011	Dom Evans	Caterham RSR
2012	Martin Davies	Ford Sierra Sapphire
2013	Chris Morris	Suzuki Ignis
2014	Keith White	BMW Z3 Silhouette
2015	Sam Summerhayes	Citroën Saxo
2016	Jason Davies	Ford Sierra Sapphire
2017	Tyrone Luffarelli	Peugeot 106
2018	Mike Moss	Caterham 1600
2019	Damian Longotano	Westfield SE
2020	No championship due to COVID-19	
2021	Gareth John	Ginetta G40
2022	Colin Dunn	Renault Clio
2023	Wayne Spiller	Mazda RX-8
2024	Wayne Spiller	Mazda RX-8
2025	Russell Haggerty	Ford Ka
2026	James Harvey	Porsche Boxster S
