= Nicolas Minassian =

French racing driver

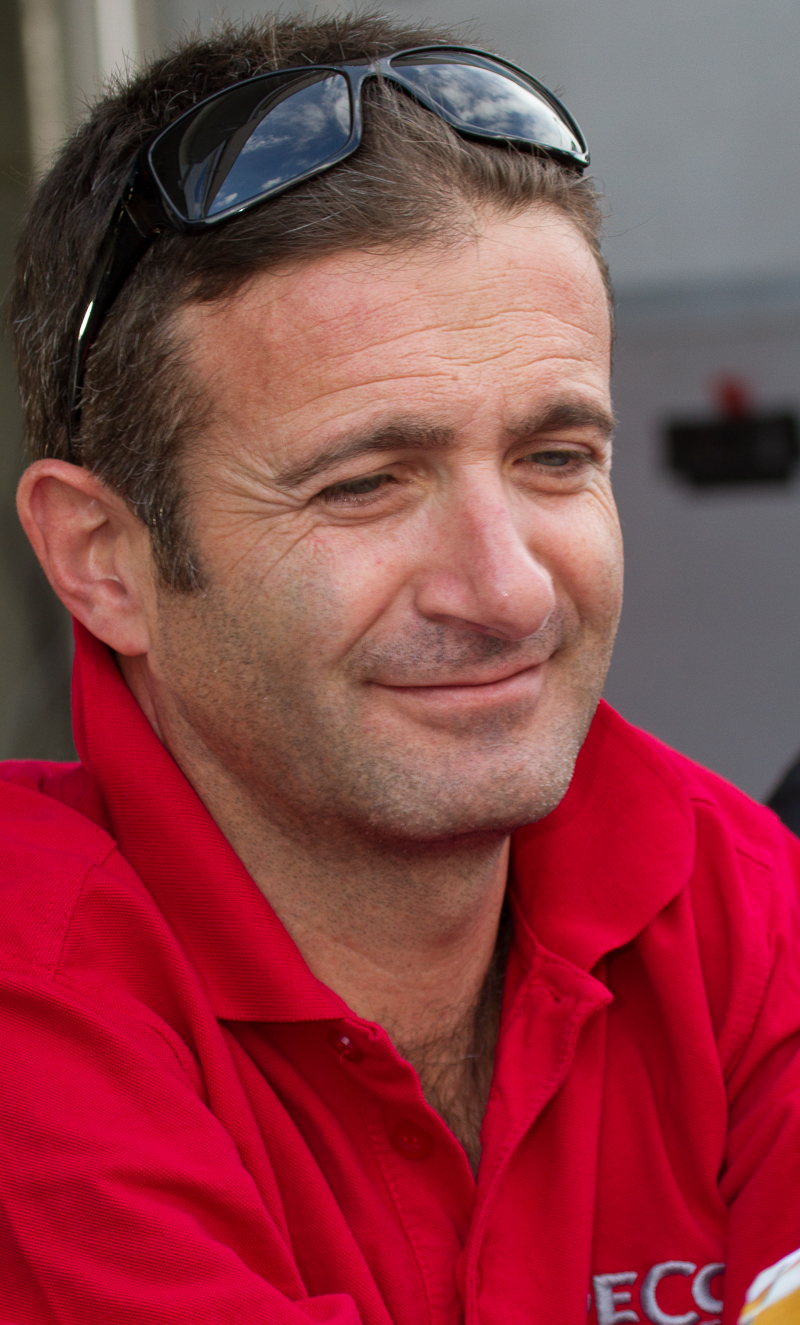
- Minassian at the 2012 6 Hours of Fuji
- Nationality: (France) French
- Born: 28 February 1973 (age 53) Marseille, France
- Categorisation: FIA Platinum (until 2021); FIA Gold (2022–2026); FIA Silver (2027–)

24 Hours of Le Mans career
- Years: 1994, 2000, 2002–2016
- Teams: Roland Bassaler, Team Oreca, Pescarolo Sport, Creation Autosportif, Peugeot, SMP Racing.
- Best finish: 2nd (2008)
- Class wins: 0

Nicolas Minassian (Armenian: Նիքոլա Մինասյան; born 28 February 1973) is a French professional racing driver of Armenian descent.

After finishing second place in the 1993 Formula Renault Eurocup, Marseille-born Minassian graduated to the French Formula Three Championship where he finished runner-up to countryman Laurent Redon at his second attempt in 1995. He then moved to the British series for another two years in a successful partnership with Promatecme and Renault UK that yielded a fourth place in 1996 and second place the following year.

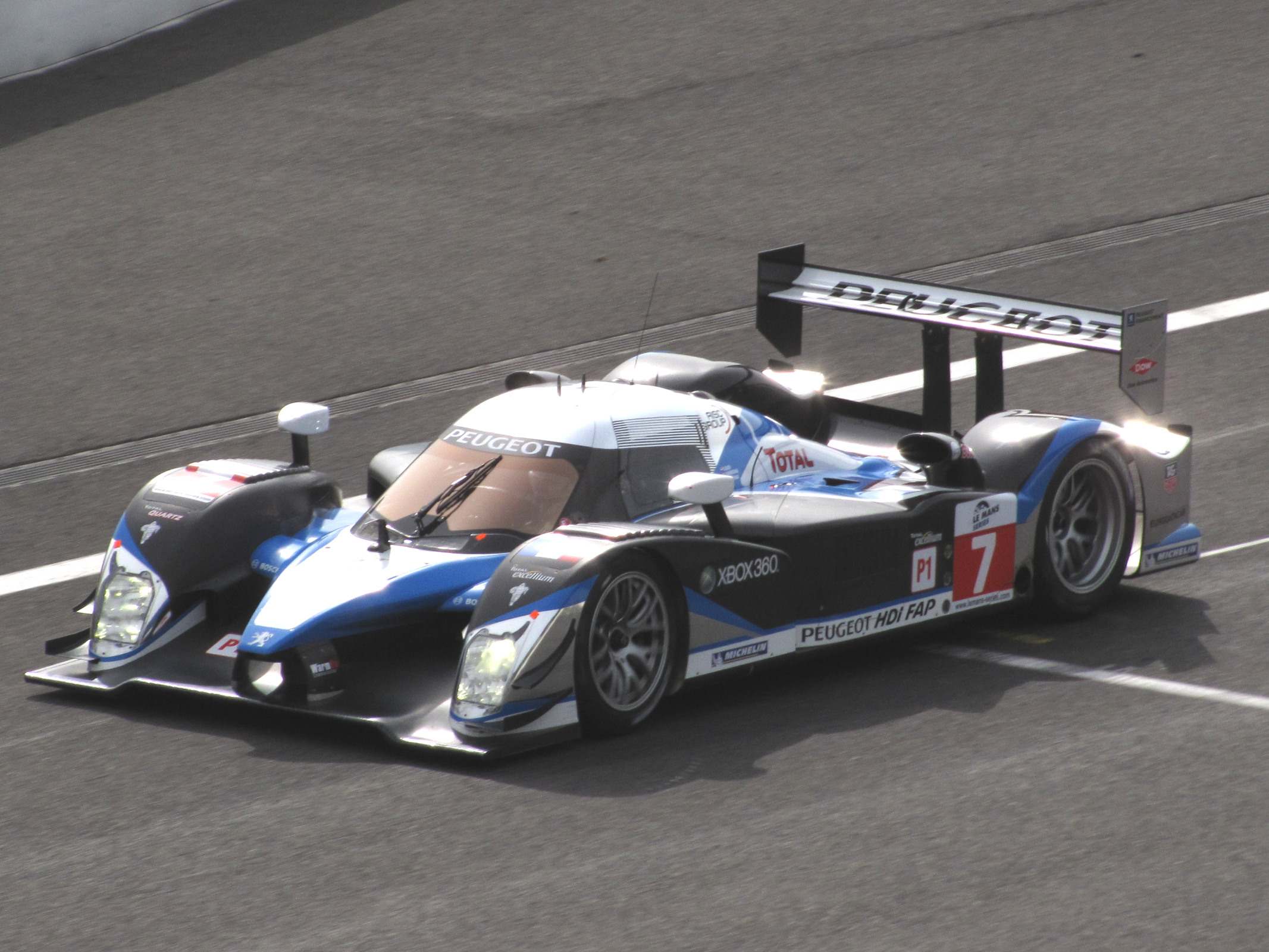
Minassian racing for Peugeot LMP1 at the 2009 Spa 1000km.

Minassian graduated to Formula 3000 with West Competition for 1998, but failed to impress whilst his teammate Nick Heidfeld mounted a strong challenge for overall honours. The following year, he moved to Kid Jensen Racing where he enjoyed more success, including an emphatic lights-to-flag triumph at Silverstone. He signed for the illustrious Super Nova Racing team in 2000 where he came a strong second in the championship.

Unable to secure a Formula One drive despite promising tests for Williams and BAR Honda, Minassian moved to CART in 2001 for Target Chip Ganassi Racing with F3000 title adversary Bruno Junqueira and competed in the Indianapolis 500 before being released. In 2002, Minassian won the ASCAR oval racing series for RML Group before returning to endurance racing for such teams as Creation Autosportif and Pescarolo Sport.

In 2007, Minassian became a factory driver for the Peugeot 908 HDi FAP diesel LMP1 in the Le Mans Series. He competed in the 24 Hours of Le Mans for the brand until 2011, scoring two overall podiums and a fastest lap. After Peugeot's programme ended, Minassian raced in the FIA WEC's LMP2 class for the AF Corse–run PeCom and SMP Racing teams.

In 2013, Minassian was named by Autosport as one of the top 50 drivers who never raced in Formula One.

== Other ventures ==
In 2017, Minassian co-founded BBM Sport with Bob Berridge and Steve Briggs, and began restoring Peugeot 908 HDi FAP and Peugeot 908 LMP1s for use in historic racing. In 2018, Minassian was appointed sporting director of fledgling LMP2 team IDEC Sport, and guided it to the 2019 European Le Mans Series title before stepping up to the role of team principal in 2021.

In 2019, Minassian founded a management agency, Bullet Sports Management, together with his former team-mate Jamie Campbell-Walter and María Catarineu. The company represents the likes of Ferdinand Habsburg, Franco Colapinto, Oliver Goethe and Rui Andrade.

== Racing record ==
=== 24 Hours of Le Mans results ===
Year	Team	Co-drivers	Car	Class	Laps	Pos.	Class pos.
1994	(France) Roland Bassaler	(France) Patrick Bourdais (France) Olivier Couvreur	Alpa LM-Ford Cosworth	LMP1; C90	64	DNF	DNF
2000	(France) Mopar Team Oreca	(France) Yannick Dalmas (France) Jean-Philippe Belloc	Reynard 2KQ-LM-Mopar	LMP900	1	DNF	DNF
2002	(France) PlayStation Team Oreca	(France) Stéphane Sarrazin (France) Franck Montagny	Dallara SP1-Judd	LMP900	359	6th	5th
2003	(France) Pescarolo Sport	(France) Éric Hélary (France) Soheil Ayari	Courage C60-Peugeot	LMP900	352	9th	7th
2004	(France) Pescarolo Sport	(France) Sébastien Bourdais (France) Emmanuel Collard	Pescarolo C60-Judd	LMP1	282	DNF	DNF
2005	(United Kingdom) Creation Autosportif Ltd.	(United Kingdom) Jamie Campbell-Walter (United Kingdom) Andy Wallace	DBA 03S-Judd	LMP1	322	14th	7th
2006	(France) Pescarolo Sport	(France) Emmanuel Collard (France) Érik Comas	Pescarolo C60 Hybrid-Judd	LMP1	352	5th	4th
2007	(France) Team Peugeot Total	(Canada) Jacques Villeneuve (Spain) Marc Gené	Peugeot 908 HDi FAP	LMP1	338	DNF	DNF
2008	(France) Team Peugeot Total	(Canada) Jacques Villeneuve (Spain) Marc Gené	Peugeot 908 HDi FAP	LMP1	381	**2nd**	**2nd**
2009	(France) Team Peugeot Total	(Portugal) Pedro Lamy (Austria) Christian Klien	Peugeot 908 HDi FAP	LMP1	369	6th	6th
2010	(France) Team Peugeot Total	(France) Stéphane Sarrazin (France) Franck Montagny	Peugeot 908 HDi FAP	LMP1	264	DNF	DNF
2011	(France) Peugeot Sport Total	(France) Stéphane Sarrazin (France) Franck Montagny	Peugeot 908	LMP1	353	**3rd**	**3rd**
2012	(France) Pescarolo Team	(France) Sébastien Bourdais (Japan) Seiji Ara	Dome S102.5-Judd	LMP1	203	NC	NC
2013	(Argentina) PeCom Racing	(Argentina) Luís Pérez Companc (Germany) Pierre Kaffer	Oreca 03-Nissan	LMP2	325	10th	4th
2014	(Russia) SMP Racing	(Russia) Kirill Ladygin (Italy) Maurizio Mediani	Oreca 03R-Nissan	LMP2	9	DNF	DNF
2015	(Russia) SMP Racing	(Russia) David Markozov (Italy) Maurizio Mediani	BR Engineering BR01-Nissan	LMP2	340	14th	6th
2016	(Russia) SMP Racing	(Russia) Mikhail Aleshin (Italy) Maurizio Mediani	BR Engineering BR01-Nissan	LMP2	347	11th	7th

=== Complete British Formula Three Championship results ===
(key) (Races in bold indicate pole position) (Races in italics indicate fastest lap)

Year	Entrant	Chassis	Engine	1	2	3	4	5	6	7	8	9	10	11	12	13	14	15	16	17	DC	Pts
1996	Promatecme UK	Dallara F396	Renault	SIL; 1; 9	SIL; 2; 8	THR; 7	DON; 5	BRH; 1; 2	BRH; 2; 3	OUL; 3	DON; 3	SIL; 9	THR; Ret	SNE; 1; 17	SNE; 2 C	PEM; 1; 1	PEM; 2; 7	ZAN; 1; 3	ZAN; 2; 3	**SIL**; 1	4th	139
1997	Promatecme UK	Dallara F397	Renault	DON; 4	**SIL**; 1	**THR**; DSQ	BRH	SIL	CRO; 1	OUL; Ret	**SIL**; 3	PEM; 1 Ret	PEM; 2; 1	**DON**; 1	SNE; 1; 4	**SNE**; **2**; 1	SPA; 6	**SIL**; 1	THR; 1		2nd	183

=== Complete International Formula 3000 results ===
(key) (Races in bold indicate pole position; races in italics indicate fastest lap.)

Year	Entrant	1	2	3	4	5	6	7	8	9	10	11	12	DC	Points
1998	West Competition	OSC; Ret	IML; 19	CAT; Ret	SIL; 7	MON; 9	PAU; 7	A1; 5	HOC; Ret	HUN; 4	SPA; 19	PER; 19	NUR	13th	5
1999	Kid Jensen Racing	IMO; 13	MON; Ret	CAT; 8	MAG; 14	**SIL**; 1	A1R; 3	HOC; Ret	HUN; 5	SPA; 3	NUR; Ret			6th	20
2000	D2 Playlife Super Nova	IMO; 1	SIL; 11	CAT; 2	NUR; Ret	MON; 5	MAG; 1	A1R; 1	HOC; 7	HUN; 4	SPA; 3			**2nd**	**45**
2003	Brand Motorsport	IMO; 11	CAT	A1R	MON	NUR	MAG	SIL	HOC	HUN	MNZ			NC	0

=== American open–wheel racing results ===
(key)

==== CART ====
Year	Team	No.	Chassis	Engine	1	2	3	4	5	6	7	8	9	10	11	12	13	14	15	16	17	18	19	20	21	Rank	Points	Ref
2001	Chip Ganassi Racing	12	Lola B01/00	Toyota RV8E	MTY; 11	LBH; 8	TXS; NH	NZR; 18	MOT; 15	MIL; 19	DET; 17	POR	CLE	TOR	MIS	CHI	MDO	ROA	VAN	LAU	ROC	HOU	LS	SRF	FON	**27th**	**7**	

==== IRL IndyCar Series ====
Year	Team	No.	Chassis	Engine	1	2	3	4	5	6	7	8	9	10	11	12	13	Rank	Points	Ref
2001	Chip Ganassi Racing	49	G-Force	Oldsmobile	PHX	HOM	ATL	INDY; 29	TEX	PIK	RIR	KAN	NSH	KTY	GAT	CHI	TEX	47th	1	

==== Indy 500 results ====
Year	Chassis	Engine	Start	Finish	Team
2001	G-Force	Oldsmobile	22	29	Ganassi

=== Complete V8 Supercar results ===
Year	Team	Car	1	2	3	4	5	6	7	8	9	10	11	12	13	14	15	16	17	18	19	20	21	22	23	24	25	26	27	28	29	30	31	Final pos	Points
2003	Team Dynamik	Holden VY Commodore	ADL	PHI	ECK	WIN	PTH	HDV	QLD	ORP	SAN; 28	BAT; 11	SUR	PUK	ECK																			44th	152
2012	Brad Jones Racing	Holden VE Commodore	ADE; R1	ADE; R2	SYM; R3	SYM; R4	HAM; R5	HAM; R6	PER; R7	PER; R8	PER; R9	PHI; R10	PHI; R11	HDV; R12	HDV; R13	TOW; R14	TOW; R15	QLD; R16	QLD; R17	SMP; R18	SMP; R19	SAN; Q	SAN; R20	BAT; R21	SUR; R22; Ret	SUR; R23; 10	YMC; R24	YMC; R25	YMC; R26	WIN; R27	WIN; R28	SYD; R29	SYD; R30	NC	0 +

+ Not Eligible for points

Bathurst 1000 results

Year	Team	Car	Co-driver	Position	Laps
2003	Team Dynamik	Holden Commodore VY	(Denmark) Jan Magnussen	11th	158

=== Complete American Le Mans Series results ===
Year	Entrant	Class	Chassis	Engine	Tyres	1	2	3	4	5	6	7	8	9	10	11	Rank	Points
2004	Creation Autosportif	LMP1	DBA 03S	Zytek ZG348 3.4L V8	D	SEB	MID	LIM	SON	POR	MOS	AME	PET ovr:Ret cls:Ret	**MON** ovr:Ret cls:Ret			NC	0
2006	Creation Autosportif	LMP1	Creation CA06/H	Judd GV5 S2 5.0L V10	M	SEB	TEX	MID	LIM	UTA	POR	AME	MOS	**PET** ovr:4 cls:4	MON ovr:3 cls:3		15th	32
2008	Peugeot Sport Total	LMP1	Peugeot 908 HDi FAP	Peugeot HDi 5.5 L V12 (Diesel)	M	SEB ovr:11 cls:4	STP	LNB	UTA	LIM	MID	AME	MOS	DET	**PET** ovr:2 cls:2	MON	9th	46
2009	Team Peugeot Total	LMP1	Peugeot 908 HDi FAP	Peugeot HDI 5.5 L Turbo V12 (Diesel)	M	SEB ovr:5 cls:4	STP	LNB	UTA	LIM	MID	AME	MOS	**PET** ovr:2 cls:2	MON		15th	46
2010	Team Peugeot Total	LMP1	Peugeot 908 HDi FAP	Peugeot HDI 5.5 L Turbo V12 (Diesel)	M	SEB ovr:2 cls:2	LNB	MON	UTA	LIM	MID	AME	MOS	PET			NC	0

=== Complete Le Mans Series results ===
Year	Entrant	Class	Chassis	Engine	Tyres	1	2	3	4	5	6	Rank	Points
2004	Creation Autosportif	LMP1	DBA 03S	Zytek 3.4 L V8	D	MON ovr:Ret cls:Ret	**NÜR** ovr:3 cls:3	SIL ovr:Ret cls:Ret	**SPA** ovr:3 cls:3			4th	12
2005	Creation Autosportif	LMP1	DBA 03S	Zytek 3.4 L V8	M	SPA ovr:Ret cls:Ret	MON ovr:7 cls:5	**SIL** ovr:2 cls:2	**NÜR** ovr:3 cls:3	IST ovr:3 cls:3		5th	24
2006	Creation Autosportif	LMP1	Creation CA06/H	Judd 2.5 L V10	M	IST ovr:Ret cls:Ret	SPA	**NÜR** ovr:2 cls:2	DON ovr:2 cls:2	JAR ovr:4 cls:4		6th	14
2007	Team Peugeot Total	LMP1	Peugeot 908 HDi FAP	Peugeot 5.5L Turbo V12 (Diesel)	M	**MON** ovr:1 cls:1	**VAL** ovr:Ret cls:Ret	**NÜR** ovr:2 cls:2	**SPA** ovr:Ret cls:Ret	**SIL** ovr:1 cls:1	MIL ovr:1 cls:1	3rd	33
2008	Team Peugeot Total	LMP1	Peugeot 908 HDi FAP	Peugeot 5.5L Turbo V12 (Diesel)	M	CAT ovr:1 cls:1	**MON** ovr:5 cls:5	SPA ovr:1 cls:1	**NÜR** ovr:2 cls:2	SIL ovr:Ret cls:Ret		2nd	32
2009	Team Peugeot Total	LMP1	Peugeot 908 HDi FAP	Peugeot 5.5L Turbo V12 (Diesel)	M	CAT	**SPA** ovr:1 cls:1	ALG	NÜR	SIL		10th	11
2010	Team Peugeot Total	LMP1	Peugeot 908 HDi FAP	Peugeot 5.5L Turbo V12 (Diesel)	M	CAS	SPA	ALG	HUN	SIL ovr:1 cls:1		16th	15
2011	Peugeot Sport Total	LMP1	Peugeot 908	Peugeot HDI 3.7 L Turbo V8 (Diesel)	M	CAS	SPA ovr:2 cls:2	IMO	SIL	EST		NC	0
2012	Sébastien Loeb Racing	LMP2	Oreca 03	Nissan VK45DE 4.5 L V8	D	CAS ovr:2 cls:2	DON ovr:4 cls:4	PET				6th	30

=== Complete WeatherTech SportsCar Championship results ===
(key) (Races in bold indicate pole position; races in italics indicate fastest lap)

Year	Entrant	Class	Make	Engine	1	2	3	4	5	6	7	8	9	10	Rank	Points
2016	SMP Racing	P	BR Engineering BR01	Nissan VK45DE 4.5 L V8	DAY; 9										24th	52
2016	DragonSpeed	P	Oreca 05	Nissan VK45DE 4.5 L V8		SEB; 4	LBH	LGA	DET	WGL	MOS	ELK	COA	PET	24th	52

Awards and achievements
Preceded by John Mickel	ASCAR Champion; 2002	Succeeded by Ben Collins
