= Pembrey Circuit =

Motor racing circuit in Wales

- Full Circuit (1989–present)
- Location: Carmarthenshire, Wales, United Kingdom
- Coordinates: 51°42′20″N 4°19′14″W
- FIA Grade: 4 (Note: Pembrey Circuit's Grade 4 licence expired 21 September 2022.)
- Owner: Welsh Race Drivers' Association
- Operator: British Automobile Racing Club
- Opened: 21 May 1989; 37 years ago
- Major events: Current: Welsh Sports and Saloon Car Championship (1991–2019, 2021–present); Former: British Formula Renault Winter Series (2004, 2010); Formula Renault BARC (1995–2006); British Formula 3 Championship (1992–1999); FIA European Rallycross Championship (1997–1998); British Superbike Championship (1990, 1994); British Touring Car Championship (1992–1993)

Full Circuit (1989–present)
- Length: 2.343 km (1.456 mi)
- Turns: 8
- Race lap record: 0:50.079 ( (Argentina) Brian Smith, Dallara F397, 1997, F3)

Pembrey Circuit is a motor racing circuit near Pembrey village, Carmarthenshire, Wales. It is the home of Welsh motorsport, providing racing for cars, motorcycles, karts and trucks. The circuit's facilities are also used for single-venue rally events.

== History ==
The stimulus for the creation of a racing circuit at Pembrey was the closure of the motor racing facility at Llandow near Cardiff. Port Talbot Motor Cycle Racing Club were the first organisation to put on racing events at this circuit. In 1981 the Welsh Race Drivers' Association (WRDA) was formed with the expressed intention of developing a new race circuit in Wales. At the same time the former RAF airfield at Pembrey, which had been used as a chicken farm, was acquired by Llanelli Borough Council. Following a representation by the WRDA the decision was taken to construct a racing circuit at the venue. The first race meeting was held on 21 May 1989, and the winner of the first race at the circuit was Nigel Petch in an MGB.

In 1990 the BARC signed a 50-year lease to operate the circuit on behalf of Carmarthenshire County Council.

== Testing ==
The circuit is popular for testing, mainly due to its variety of fast sweeping corners and tight hairpins. It is often referred to as a drivers' favourite. Formula One teams have tested at the circuit including McLaren and their drivers Ayrton Senna and Alain Prost in the late 1980s. Arrows, Benetton, Jordan and Williams all tested at Pembrey in the early 1990s with BAR being the last Formula One team to test at Pembrey in 1998. The SEAT and VX Racing BTCC teams have tested there in previous years, as has Nigel Mansell in a GP Masters car. These F1 cars are likely to have set times faster than the official lap record, and indeed locals at the circuit still talk of the sensational unofficial lap record set by Ayrton Senna. However, convention dictates that the official lap record is the fastest lap set under racing conditions, so that honour goes to Argentine Formula 3 driver, Brian Smith, who in a Dallara F397 set a time of 0:50.079 in 1997.

Senna's lap time in testing was 0:44.43.

In recent seasons the circuit has been a popular venue for GT and F3 teams to test at, not only because of the quality of the circuit, but also due to the less stringent noise restrictions in place than at other British circuits.

== Configurations ==
The circuit has two different sections, an all tarmac race circuit and a rally cross circuit utilizing some of the race circuit with an addition off-road surface. The circuit is operated by the British Automobile Racing Club (BARC) under the terms of a 50-year lease from Carmarthenshire County Council. A third configuration was also used in 1996, which was that of a short oval. This followed the race circuit from the Start/Finish straight, through the first two corners of the track, before turning left at the third corner and returning to the Start/Finish straight. There were plans to include a quarter mile drag strip, but this never came to fruition.The proposed Drag Strip never got off the ground.

== Major events ==
The circuit has hosted the British Touring Car Championship twice, in 1992 and 1993 at which time the championship was the most popular motorsport series in the UK outside Formula One. Formula 3 races have also been run at Pembrey Circuit, and indeed many recent Formula 1 drivers including Jenson Button raced at Pembrey in their early F3 days. Pembrey twice hosted the European Rallycross Championship in 1997 and 1998. Top-level Superbike racing has also been hosted at Pembrey, in 1990 and 1994.

Over the winter of 2005/06 a new pit lane was constructed. Highlights on the 2018 calendar include rounds of the British Rallycross Championship and two rounds of the British Truce Racing Championship, organized by the BTRA. The circuit serves as the main venue for the Welsh Sports and Saloon Car Championship, which has been particularly successful in recent years attracting a wide range of cars and averaging grids of over 20. In addition, the British Motorcycle Racing Club, the British Drift Championship and two single venue rallies, amongst others, were held in February and October.

== Prost vs. Senna – Pembrey Folklore ==
Following an incident at the 1989 San Marino Grand Prix, the Alain Prost/Ayrton Senna war began to build up speed after the Frenchman said that McLaren had a pre-race agreement that whoever led into the first turn should stay there, which was ironically suggested by Senna. In Prost's view, Senna had broken this agreement by passing him partway round the first lap after the restart. The following week McLaren were testing at Pembrey, and Ron Dennis (team principal) summoned both drivers to attend, as he was determined to re-establish law and order. Senna was refusing to apologise, and Jo Ramírez even heard that “he’d apparently said that the deal had been not to actually pass Prost by slipstreaming before that the move was allowable!” He really only apologised because of the pressure under which Dennis put him at Pembrey, and for the good of the team but he wasn’t happy about it.

== Major race results ==
=== British Formula Three Championship ===
Year	Date	Winning driver	Car	Team
1999	15 August – Race 1	(Denmark) Kristian Kolby	Dallara F399	Fortec Motorsport
	15 August – Race 2	(United Kingdom) Jenson Button	Dallara F399	Promatecme UK
1998	16 August – Race 1	(Brazil) Mario Haberfeld	Dallara F398	Paul Stewart Racing
	16 August – Race 2	(Brazil) Luciano Burti	Dallara F398	Paul Stewart Racing
1997	17 August – Race 1	(Argentina) Brian Smith	Dallara F397	Fortec Motorsport
	17 August – Race 2	(France) Nicolas Minassian	Dallara F397	Promatecme
1996	1 September – Race 1	(France) Nicolas Minassian	Dallara F396	Promatecme
	1 September – Race 2	(United Kingdom) Jonny Kane	Dallara F396	Paul Stewart Racing
1995	24 September – Race 1	(Republic of Ireland) Ralph Firman	Dallara F395	Paul Stewart Racing
	24 September – Race 2	(United Kingdom) Oliver Gavin	Dallara F395	Edenbridge Racing
1994	21 August – Race 1	(Denmark) Jan Magnussen	Dallara F394	Paul Stewart Racing
	21 August – Race 2	(Denmark) Jan Magnussen	Dallara F394	Paul Stewart Racing
1993	22 August - Race 1	(United Kingdom) Oliver Gavin	Dallara F393	Edenbridge Racing
	21 August – Race 2	(Brazil) Gil de Ferran	Dallara F392	Paul Stewart Racing

=== British Touring Car Championship ===
Year	Date	Winning driver	Car	Team
1993	27 June	(Germany) Joachim Winkelhock	BMW 318i	BMW Motorsport Team
1992	9 August	(United Kingdom) Tim Harvey	BMW 318is	M Team Shell Racing

=== European Rallycross Championship ===
Year	Date	Category	Winning driver	Car
1998	28 June	Division 1	(Sweden) Per Eklund	Saab 900 T16 4x4
		Division 2	no starters present	
		1400 Cup	(Belgium) Jean-Michel Laurant	Peugeot 1066 XSi
1997	15 June	Division 1	(Norway) Ludvig Hunsbedt	Ford Escort RS2000 T16 4x4
		Division 2	(Norway) Elvind Opland	Mitsubishi Lancer Evolution 3
		1400 Cup	(Belgium) Jean-Michel Laurant	Peugeot 106 XSi

=== British Superbike Championship ===
Year	Race	Rider	Manufacturer
1994	1994 HEAT TT Superbike Supercup Rd.13	(United Kingdom) Ian Simpson	588 cc Norton RFI 588
	1994 HEAT TT Superbike Supercup Rd.14	(United Kingdom) Ian Simpson	588 cc Norton RFI 588
1990	1990 Shell Supercup/ACU British Championship, 750cc TT F1 Rd.3	(United Kingdom) Terry Rymer	750 cc Yamaha 0W01

== Lap records ==
As of May 2022, the fastest official race lap records at the Pembrey Circuit are listed as:

Category	Time	Driver	Vehicle	Event
Full Circuit (1989–present): 2.343 km (1.456 mi)
Formula Three	0:50.079	Brian Smith	Dallara F397	1997 Pembrey British F3 round
Formula Renault	0:53.057	Joni Wiman	Barazi-Epsilon FR2.0-10	2010 Pembrey Formula Renault UK Winter Series round
Superbike	0:59.280	Jim Moodie	Yamaha YZF750	1994 Pembrey British Supercup round
Super Touring	1:00.720	Will Hoy	Toyota Carina	1992 Pembrey BTCC round
Truck racing	1:10.355	Ryan Smith	Daimler Truck 12000	2022 1st Pembrey BTRC round

== See also ==
- RAF Pembrey
- Pembrey Airport
- Court Farm, Pembrey
- Llandow Circuit
- Anglesey Circuit
